= 2009 Indian general election in Tripura =

- 23 April 2009

2 seats
- Turnout: 84.55%
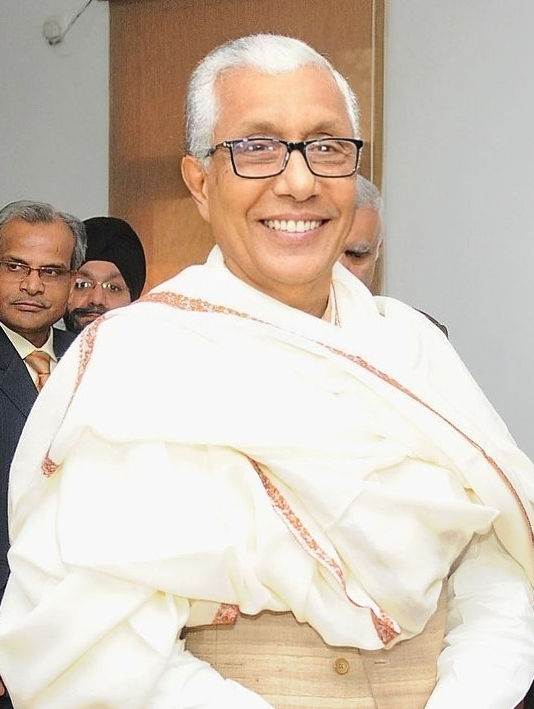
| | First party |
|---|---|
| Leader | Manik Sarkar |
| Party | CPI(M) |
| Seats won | 2 |
| Seat change | Steady |
| Percentage | 61.69% |
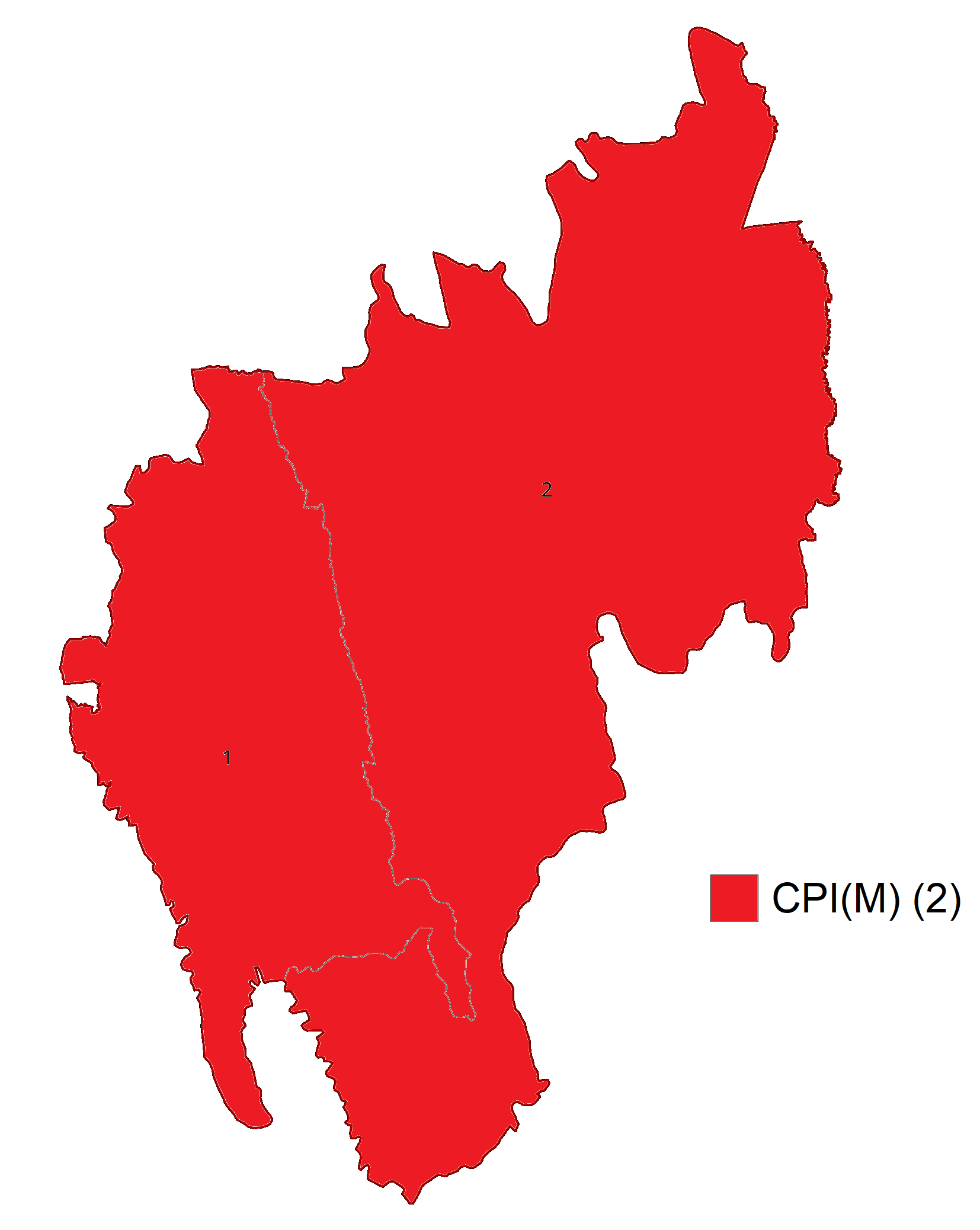
Prime Minister before election
Manmohan Singh
INC
Prime Minister after election
Manmohan Singh
INC

The 2009 Indian general election in the state of Tripura was held in April with two seats being contested. The Communist Party of India (Marxist) held both seats, receiving a total of 1,084,883 votes with a state-wide share of 61.69%. Congress and the BJP received 31% and 3% of the state-wide vote, respectively, and won no seats.

== Parties and alliances ==
| Party | Flag | Symbol | Leader | Seats contested |
|---|---|---|---|---|
| Communist Party of India (Marxist) | | | Manik Sarkar | 2 |
| Bharatiya Janata Party | | | L. K. Advani | 2 |
| Indian National Congress | | | Sonia Gandhi | 2 |

== Results ==
| Party Name | Popular vote | | | Seats | | |
| Party Name | Votes | % | ±pp | Contested | Won | +/− |
|---|---|---|---|---|---|---|
| CPI(M) | 10,84,883 | 61.69 | ▼7.11 | 2 | 2 | Steady |
| INC | 5,40,753 | 30.75 | ▲16.47 | 2 | 0 | Steady |
| BJP | 59,457 | 3.38 | ▼4.44 | 2 | 0 | Steady |
| Others | 37,710 | 2.15 | Steady | 8 | 0 | Steady |
| IND | 35,698 | 2.03 | ▼0.37 | 5 | 0 | Steady |
| Total | 17,58,501 | 100% | - | 19 | 2 | - |

== List of elected MPs ==
Source: Election Commission of India

| Constituency | | Winner | | | | Runner-up | | | | Margin | |
| Constituency | | Candidate | Party | Votes | % | Candidate | Party | Votes | % | Votes | % |
|---|---|---|---|---|---|---|---|---|---|---|---|
| 1 | Tripura West | Khagen Das | CPI(M) | 563,799 | 60.14 | Sudip Roy Barman | INC | 315,250 | 33.63 | 248,549 | 26.51 |
| 2 | Tripura East | Baju Ban Riyan | CPI(M) | 521,084 | 63.4 | Diba Chandra Hrangkhawl | INC | 225,503 | 27.47 | 295,581 | 35.93 |

== Assembly Seat wise leads ==
| Constituency | | Winner | | | Runner-up | | | Margin |
| # | Name | Candidate | Party | Votes | Candidate | Party | Votes | Margin |
Tripura West Lok Sabha constituency
| 1 | Simna (ST) | Khagen Das | CPI(M) | 16,134 | Sudip Roy Barman | INC | 7,304 | 8,830 |
| 2 | Mohanpur | Khagen Das | CPI(M) | 15,790 | Sudip Roy Barman | INC | 13,251 | 2,539 |
| 3 | Bamutia (SC) | Khagen Das | CPI(M) | 17,791 | Sudip Roy Barman | INC | 11,005 | 6,786 |
| 4 | Barjala (SC) | Khagen Das | CPI(M) | 16,103 | Sudip Roy Barman | INC | 10,940 | 5,163 |
| 5 | Khayerpur | Khagen Das | CPI(M) | 20,928 | Sudip Roy Barman | INC | 10,646 | 10,282 |
| 6 | Agartala | Khagen Das | CPI(M) | 17,746 | Sudip Roy Barman | INC | 14,388 | 3,358 |
| 7 | Ramnagar | Khagen Das | CPI(M) | 16,348 | Sudip Roy Barman | INC | 10,662 | 5,686 |
| 8 | Town Bordowali | Khagen Das | CPI(M) | 15,444 | Sudip Roy Barman | INC | 14,460 | 984 |
| 9 | Banamalipur | Khagen Das | CPI(M) | 13,271 | Sudip Roy Barman | INC | 12,782 | 489 |
| 10 | Majlishpur | Khagen Das | CPI(M) | 20,941 | Sudip Roy Barman | INC | 10,681 | 10,260 |
| 11 | Mandaibazar (ST) | Khagen Das | CPI(M) | 19,340 | Sudip Roy Barman | INC | 8,545 | 10,795 |
| 12 | Takarjala (ST) | Khagen Das | CPI(M) | 16,480 | Sudip Roy Barman | INC | 7,888 | 8,592 |
| 13 | Pratapgarh (SC) | Khagen Das | CPI(M) | 22,524 | Sudip Roy Barman | INC | 12,970 | 9,554 |
| 14 | Badharghat (SC) | Khagen Das | CPI(M) | 22,295 | Sudip Roy Barman | INC | 15,417 | 6,878 |
| 15 | Kamalasagar | Khagen Das | CPI(M) | 17,353 | Sudip Roy Barman | INC | 9,662 | 7,691 |
| 16 | Bishalgarh | Khagen Das | CPI(M) | 19,265 | Sudip Roy Barman | INC | 11,722 | 7,543 |
| 17 | Golaghati (ST) | Khagen Das | CPI(M) | 17,094 | Sudip Roy Barman | INC | 7,983 | 9,111 |
| 18 | Suryamaninagar | Khagen Das | CPI(M) | 20,250 | Sudip Roy Barman | INC | 12,212 | 8,038 |
| 19 | Charilam (ST) | Khagen Das | CPI(M) | 15,442 | Sudip Roy Barman | INC | 7,265 | 8,177 |
| 20 | Boxanagar | Khagen Das | CPI(M) | 15,702 | Sudip Roy Barman | INC | 8,768 | 6,934 |
| 21 | Nalchar (SC) | Khagen Das | CPI(M) | 19,577 | Sudip Roy Barman | INC | 8,736 | 10,841 |
| 22 | Sonamura | Khagen Das | CPI(M) | 16,923 | Sudip Roy Barman | INC | 10,056 | 6,867 |
| 23 | Dhanpur | Khagen Das | CPI(M) | 19,522 | Sudip Roy Barman | INC | 8,362 | 11,160 |
| 30 | Bagma (ST) | Khagen Das | CPI(M) | 21,109 | Sudip Roy Barman | INC | 11,079 | 10,030 |
| 31 | Radhakishorepur | Khagen Das | CPI(M) | 18,865 | Sudip Roy Barman | INC | 11,352 | 7,513 |
| 32 | Matarbari | Khagen Das | CPI(M) | 21,860 | Sudip Roy Barman | INC | 11,115 | 10,745 |
| 33 | Kakraban-Salgarh (SC) | Khagen Das | CPI(M) | 24,377 | Sudip Roy Barman | INC | 9,201 | 15,176 |
| 34 | Rajnagar (SC) | Khagen Das | CPI(M) | 22,160 | Sudip Roy Barman | INC | 6,599 | 15,561 |
| 35 | Belonia | Khagen Das | CPI(M) | 19,442 | Sudip Roy Barman | INC | 9,268 | 10,174 |
| 36 | Santirbazar (ST) | Khagen Das | CPI(M) | 20,361 | Sudip Roy Barman | INC | 9,220 | 11,141 |
Tripura East Lok Sabha constituency
| 24 | Ramchandraghat (ST) | Baju Ban Riyan | CPI(M) | 18,522 | Diba Chandra Hrangkhawl | INC | 3,468 | 15,054 |
| 25 | Khowai | Baju Ban Riyan | CPI(M) | 22,398 | Diba Chandra Hrangkhawl | INC | 7,303 | 15,095 |
| 26 | Asharambari (ST) | Baju Ban Riyan | CPI(M) | 17,013 | Diba Chandra Hrangkhawl | INC | 3,203 | 13,810 |
| 27 | Kalyanpur-Pramodenagar | Baju Ban Riyan | CPI(M) | 18,289 | Diba Chandra Hrangkhawl | INC | 8,832 | 9,457 |
| 28 | Teliamura | Baju Ban Riyan | CPI(M) | 16,666 | Diba Chandra Hrangkhawl | INC | 9,605 | 7,061 |
| 29 | Krishnapur (ST) | Baju Ban Riyan | CPI(M) | 15,080 | Diba Chandra Hrangkhawl | INC | 5,534 | 9,546 |
| 37 | Hrishyamukh | Baju Ban Riyan | CPI(M) | 23,271 | Diba Chandra Hrangkhawl | INC | 6,335 | 16,936 |
| 38 | Jolaibari (ST) | Baju Ban Riyan | CPI(M) | 23,467 | Diba Chandra Hrangkhawl | INC | 6,457 | 17,010 |
| 39 | Manu (ST) | Baju Ban Riyan | CPI(M) | 18,890 | Diba Chandra Hrangkhawl | INC | 7,917 | 10,973 |
| 40 | Sabroom | Baju Ban Riyan | CPI(M) | 20,619 | Diba Chandra Hrangkhawl | INC | 8,088 | 12,531 |
| 41 | Ampinagar (ST) | Baju Ban Riyan | CPI(M) | 14,478 | Diba Chandra Hrangkhawl | INC | 6,090 | 8,388 |
| 42 | Amarpur | Baju Ban Riyan | CPI(M) | 17,338 | Diba Chandra Hrangkhawl | INC | 8,297 | 9,041 |
| 43 | Karbook (ST) | Baju Ban Riyan | CPI(M) | 14,954 | Diba Chandra Hrangkhawl | INC | 6,341 | 8,613 |
| 44 | Raima Valley (ST) | Baju Ban Riyan | CPI(M) | 18,014 | Diba Chandra Hrangkhawl | INC | 7,351 | 10,663 |
| 45 | Kamalpur | Baju Ban Riyan | CPI(M) | 19,225 | Diba Chandra Hrangkhawl | INC | 8,919 | 10,306 |
| 46 | Surma (SC) | Baju Ban Riyan | CPI(M) | 19,409 | Diba Chandra Hrangkhawl | INC | 7,993 | 11,416 |
| 47 | Ambassa (ST) | Baju Ban Riyan | CPI(M) | 18,599 | Diba Chandra Hrangkhawl | INC | 8,671 | 9,928 |
| 48 | Karmachhara (ST) | Baju Ban Riyan | CPI(M) | 14,177 | Diba Chandra Hrangkhawl | INC | 8,121 | 6,056 |
| 49 | Chawamanu (ST) | Baju Ban Riyan | CPI(M) | 14,713 | Diba Chandra Hrangkhawl | INC | 6,501 | 8,212 |
| 50 | Pabiachhara (SC) | Baju Ban Riyan | CPI(M) | 18,274 | Diba Chandra Hrangkhawl | INC | 8,545 | 9,729 |
| 51 | Fatikroy (SC) | Baju Ban Riyan | CPI(M) | 16,912 | Diba Chandra Hrangkhawl | INC | 7,819 | 9,093 |
| 52 | Chandipur | Baju Ban Riyan | CPI(M) | 17,955 | Diba Chandra Hrangkhawl | INC | 8,419 | 9,536 |
| 53 | Kailashahar | Baju Ban Riyan | CPI(M) | 15,167 | Diba Chandra Hrangkhawl | INC | 11,168 | 3,999 |
| 54 | Kadamtala-Kurti | Baju Ban Riyan | CPI(M) | 13,877 | Diba Chandra Hrangkhawl | INC | 8,143 | 5,734 |
| 55 | Bagbassa | Baju Ban Riyan | CPI(M) | 15,089 | Diba Chandra Hrangkhawl | INC | 7,537 | 7,552 |
| 56 | Dharmanagar | Baju Ban Riyan | CPI(M) | 13,968 | Diba Chandra Hrangkhawl | INC | 10,035 | 3,933 |
| 57 | Jubarajnagar | Baju Ban Riyan | CPI(M) | 17,364 | Diba Chandra Hrangkhawl | INC | 6,935 | 10,429 |
| 58 | Panisagar | Baju Ban Riyan | CPI(M) | 14,875 | Diba Chandra Hrangkhawl | INC | 5,640 | 9,235 |
| 59 | Pencharthal (ST) | Baju Ban Riyan | CPI(M) | 15,094 | Diba Chandra Hrangkhawl | INC | 7,616 | 7,478 |
| 60 | Kanchanpur (ST) | Baju Ban Riyan | CPI(M) | 14,493 | Diba Chandra Hrangkhawl | INC | 7,607 | 6,886 |

== Assembly Segment wise lead ==
| Party | Assembly segments | Position in Assembly (as of 2008 election) |
|---|---|---|
| Communist Party of India (Marxist) | 60 | 46 |
| Indian National Congress | 0 | 10 |
| Others | 0 | 4 |
| Total | 60 | |
