= List of female members of the Tripura Legislative Assembly =

This is a list of women who have been elected as members of the legislative assembly (MLAs) to the Tripura Legislative Assembly.

== List ==
Party	Portrait	Name	Constituency	Year elected	Year left	Reason
CPI(M)		Gouri Bhattacharjee	Barjala	1977	1988	Defeated
INC		Gita Chowdhury	Teliamura	1983	1988	Retired
Independent		Ratna Prava Das	Pencharthal	1983	1988	Retired
INC		Bibhu Kumari Devi	Agartala	1988	1993	Retired
INC		Biva Rani Nath	Jubarajnagar	1988	1993	Defeated
CPI(M)		Kartik Kanya Debbarma	Takarjala	1993	1998	Retired
CPI(M)		Baijayanti Kalai	Takarjala	1998	2003	Defeated
CPI(M)		Sandhya Rani Debbarma	Asharambari	1998	2003	Retired
CPI(M)		Bijoy Lakshmi Singha	Kamalpur	2003	2008	Defeated
CPI(M)		Bijoy Lakshmi Singha	Kamalpur	2013	2018	Defeated
CPI(M)		Gouri Das	Teliamura	2008	2018	Defeated
CPI(M)		Rita Kar Majumder	Sabroom	2008	2018	Defeated
CPI(M)		Bijita Nath	Kadamtala	2008	2013	Constituency abolished
CPI(M)		Bijita Nath	Bagbassa	2013	2023	Defeated
CPI(M)		Tunubala Malakar	Fatikroy	2013	2018	Defeated
BJP		Kalyani Roy	Teliamura	2018		Serving
BJP		Santana Chakma	Pencharthal	2018		Serving
BJP		Mimi Majumder	Badharghat	2019	2023	Retired
BJP		Swapna Das Paul	Surma	2022		Serving
BJP		Malina Debnath	Jubarajnagar	2022	2023	Defeated
TMP		Swapna Debbarma	Mandaibazar	2023		Serving
BJP		Mina Rani Sarkar	Badharghat	2023		Serving
BJP		Antara Sarkar Deb	Kamalasagar	2023		Serving
BJP		Pratima Bhoumik	Dhanpur	2023	2023	Resigned
BJP		Swapna Majumder	Rajnagar	2023		Serving
