= 2019 Indian general election in Tripura =

Indian lower house election in Tripura

- 11,23 April 2019

2 seats
- Turnout: 82.40% (▼0.52%)

	First party	Second party	Third party
Party	BJP	INC	CPI(M)
Alliance	NDA	UPA	Left Front (Tripura)
Last election	0	0	2
Seats won	2	0	0
Seat change	▲2	Steady	▼2
Percentage	49.03%	25.34%	17.31%
Swing	▲43.26%	▲9.96%	▼47.47%
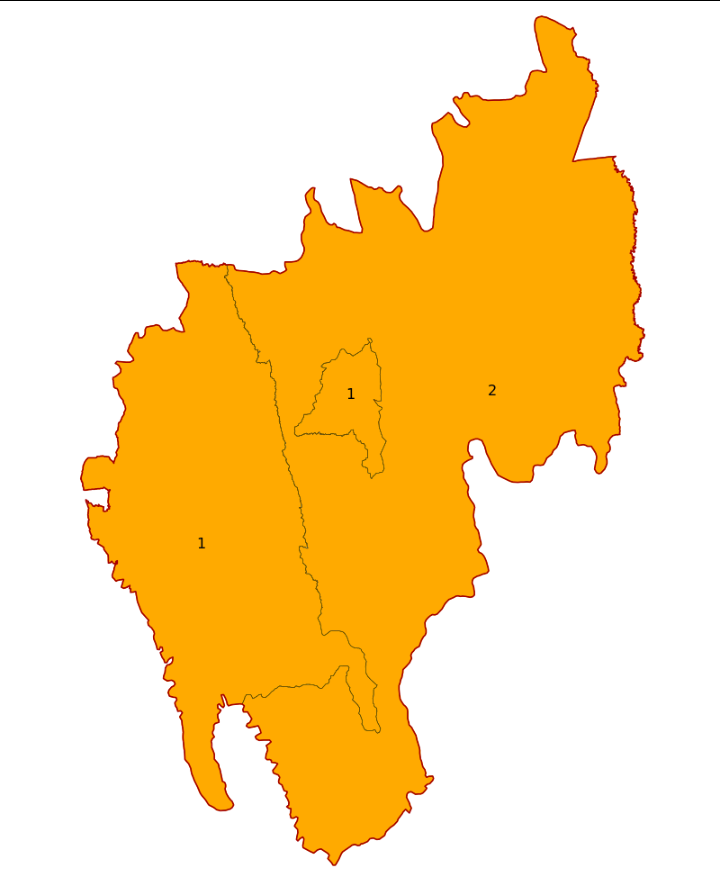
- Tripura
Prime Minister before election
Narendra Modi
BJP
Elected Prime Minister
Narendra Modi
BJP

The 2019 Indian general election were held in India on 11 April and 23 April 2019 to constitute the 17th Lok Sabha.

== Parties and alliances ==
Party	Flag	Symbol	Leader	Seats contested
Bharatiya Janata Party			Biplab Kumar Deb	2
Communist Party of India (Marxist)			Manik Sarkar	2
Indian National Congress			Kirit Pradyot Debbarman	2

== Candidates ==
Constituency							
Constituency		NDA		CPI(M)		UPA	
1	Tripura West	BJP	Pratima Bhoumik	CPI(M)	Sankar Prasad Datta	INC	Subal Bhowmik
2	Tripura East	BJP	Rebati Tripura	CPI(M)	Jitendra Choudhury	INC	Maharaj Kumari; Pragya Deb Burman

== Results ==
=== Detailed Results ===
Party Name	Popular vote			Seats		
Party Name	Votes	%	±pp	Contested	Won	+/−
BJP	10,55,658	49.03	▲43.33	2	2	▲2
INC	5,45,679	25.34	▲10.14	2	0	Steady
CPI(M)	3,72,789	17.31	▼46.70	2	0	▼2
IPFT	89,529	4.16	Steady	2	0	Steady
AITC	8,613	0.40	▼9.22	1	0	Steady
Others	23,442	2.32	Steady	5	0	Steady
IND	34,288	0.36	▼0.52	9	0	Steady
NOTA	23,174	1.08	Steady	2	Steady	Steady
Total	21,53,172	100%	-	23	2	-

=== Results ===
Party	BJP	INC	CPI(M)
Votes	49.03%, 1,055,658	25.34%, 545,679	17.31%, 372,789
Seats	2 (100%)	0 (0.00%)	0 (0.00%)
Seats	2 / 2	0 / 2	0 / 2

=== Party Wise ===
#	Constituency	Turnout	Winner	Party	Votes	Runner-up	Party	Votes	Margin
1	Tripura West	81.93 ▼	Pratima Bhowmik	BJP	5,73,532	Subal Bhowmik	INC	2,67,843	3,05,669
2	Tripura East	82.90 ▲	Rebati Tripura	BJP	4,82,126	Maharaj Kumari Pragya Deb Burman	INC	2,77,836	2,04,290

== Assembly segments wise lead of Parties ==
2019 Tripura Lok Sabha Elections Assembly Wise Map

Party	Assembly segments	Position in Assembly (as of 2018 election) & 2023
Bharatiya Janata Party	51	36
Indian National Congress	9	0
Indigenous People's Front of Tripura	0	8
Communist Party of India (Marxist)	0	16
Total	60	

=== Detailed Results - Assembly segments wise lead of Parties ===
Constituency		Winner			Runner-up			Margin
#	Name	Candidate	Party	Votes	Candidate	Party	Votes	Margin
Tripura West Lok Sabha constituency
1	Simna	Subal Bhowmik	INC	10,664	Brishaketu Debbarma	IPFT	6,210	4,454
2	Mohanpur	Pratima Bhoumik	BJP	19,479	Subal Bhowmik	INC	9,420	10,059
3	Bamutia	Pratima Bhoumik	BJP	17,872	Subal Bhowmik	INC	9,245	8,627
4	Barjala	Pratima Bhoumik	BJP	19,516	Subal Bhowmik	INC	8,025	11,491
5	Khayerpur	Pratima Bhoumik	BJP	22,976	Subal Bhowmik	INC	6,648	16,328
6	Agartala	Pratima Bhoumik	BJP	18,783	Subal Bhowmik	INC	10,955	7,828
7	Ramnagar	Pratima Bhoumik	BJP	17,096	Subal Bhowmik	INC	8,222	8,874
8	Town Bardowali	Pratima Bhoumik	BJP	18,406	Subal Bhowmik	INC	8,675	9,731
9	Banamalipur	Pratima Bhoumik	BJP	16,632	Subal Bhowmik	INC	8,333	8,299
10	Majlishpur	Pratima Bhoumik	BJP	21,862	Subal Bhowmik	INC	7,525	14,337
11	Mandaibazar	Subal Bhowmik	INC	15,213	Pratima Bhoumik	BJP	6,180	9,033
12	Takarjala	Subal Bhowmik	INC	14,111	Brishaketu Debbarma	IPFT	8,332	5,779
13	Pratapgarh	Pratima Bhoumik	BJP	25,848	Sankar Prasad Datta	CPI(M)	10,196	15,652
14	Badharghat	Pratima Bhoumik	BJP	28,140	Sankar Prasad Datta	CPI(M)	9,733	18,407
15	Kamalasagar	Pratima Bhoumik	BJP	20,069	Subal Bhowmik	INC	6,711	13,358
16	Bishalgarh	Pratima Bhoumik	BJP	24,875	Subal Bhowmik	INC	8,705	16,170
17	Golaghati	Pratima Bhoumik	BJP	11,721	Subal Bhowmik	INC	9,689	2,032
18	Suryamaninagar	Pratima Bhoumik	BJP	25,889	Sankar Prasad Datta	CPI(M)	7,177	18,712
19	Charilam	Pratima Bhoumik	BJP	15,165	Subal Bhowmik	INC	8,239	6,926
20	Boxanagar	Subal Bhowmik	INC	14,890	Pratima Bhoumik	BJP	11,899	2,991
21	Nalchar	Pratima Bhoumik	BJP	21,237	Subal Bhowmik	INC	7,490	13,747
22	Sonamura	Pratima Bhoumik	BJP	17,927	Subal Bhowmik	INC	11,816	6,111
23	Dhanpur	Pratima Bhoumik	BJP	20,090	Subal Bhowmik	INC	11,010	9,080
30	Bagma	Pratima Bhoumik	BJP	19,806	Subal Bhowmik	INC	7,293	12,513
31	Radhakishorpur	Pratima Bhoumik	BJP	24,334	Subal Bhowmik	INC	7,148	17,186
32	Matarbari	Pratima Bhoumik	BJP	24,524	Subal Bhowmik	INC	7,642	16,882
33	Kakraban-Shalgara	Pratima Bhoumik	BJP	27,179	Subal Bhowmik	INC	7,984	19,195
34	Rajnagar	Pratima Bhoumik	BJP	22,167	Sankar Prasad Datta	CPI(M)	7,354	14,813
35	Belonia	Pratima Bhoumik	BJP	21,449	Sankar Prasad Datta	CPI(M)	7,556	13,893
36	Santirbazar	Pratima Bhoumik	BJP	21,944	Subal Bhowmik	INC	7,029	14,915
Tripura East Lok Sabha constituency
24	Ramchandraghat	Maharaj Kumari Pragya Debburman	INC	17,577	Rebati Tripura	BJP	7,976	9,601
25	Khowai	Rebati Tripura	BJP	21,509	Maharaj Kumari Pragya Debburman	INC	7,774	13,735
26	Asharambari	Maharaj Kumari Pragya Debburman	INC	14,887	Narendra Chandra Debbarma	IPFT	5,971	8,916
27	Kalyanpur–Pramodenagar	Rebati Tripura	BJP	16,680	Maharaj Kumari Pragya Debburman	INC	12,439	4,241
28	Teliamura	Rebati Tripura	BJP	16,284	Maharaj Kumari Pragya Debburman	INC	10,542	5,742
29	Krishnapur	Rebati Tripura	BJP	13,559	Maharaj Kumari Pragya Debburman	INC	8,334	5,225
37	Hrishyamukh	Rebati Tripura	BJP	20,859	Jitendra Chaudhury	CPI(M)	9,547	11,312
38	Jolaibari	Rebati Tripura	BJP	21,373	Jitendra Chaudhury	CPI(M)	8,126	13,247
39	Manu	Rebati Tripura	BJP	14,687	Jitendra Chaudhury	CPI(M)	11,458	3,229
40	Sabroom	Rebati Tripura	BJP	20,303	Jitendra Chaudhury	CPI(M)	10,744	9,559
41	Ampinagar	Maharaj Kumari Pragya Debburman	INC	8,422	Rebati Tripura	BJP	7,405	1,017
42	Amarpur	Rebati Tripura	BJP	18,859	Maharaj Kumari Pragya Debburman	INC	8,160	10,699
43	Karbook	Rebati Tripura	BJP	11,169	Jitendra Chaudhury	CPI(M)	7,529	3,640
44	Raima Valley	Rebati Tripura	BJP	13,222	Maharaj Kumari Pragya Debburman	INC	8,488	4,734
45	Kamalpur	Rebati Tripura	BJP	18,788	Maharaj Kumari Pragya Debburman	INC	9,876	8,912
46	Surma	Rebati Tripura	BJP	17,755	Maharaj Kumari Pragya Debburman	INC	11,448	6,307
47	Ambassa	Rebati Tripura	BJP	15,591	Maharaj Kumari Pragya Debburman	INC	13,027	2,564
48	Karmachhara	Maharaj Kumari Pragya Debburman	INC	14,490	Rebati Tripura	BJP	9,600	4,890
49	Chawamanu	Rebati Tripura	BJP	14,632	Maharaj Kumari Pragya Debburman	INC	9,884	4,748
50	Pabiachhara	Rebati Tripura	BJP	20,871	Maharaj Kumari Pragya Debburman	INC	8,433	12,438
51	Fatikroy	Rebati Tripura	BJP	19,766	Maharaj Kumari Pragya Debburman	INC	7,365	12,401
52	Chandipur	Rebati Tripura	BJP	19,194	Maharaj Kumari Pragya Debburman	INC	7,891	11,303
53	Kailashahar	Maharaj Kumari Pragya Debburman	INC	15,369	Rebati Tripura	BJP	13,576	1,793
54	Kadamtala–Kurti	Rebati Tripura	BJP	15,668	Maharaj Kumari Pragya Debburman	INC	9,367	6,301
55	Bagbassa	Rebati Tripura	BJP	18,996	Jitendra Chaudhury	CPI(M)	7,624	11,372
56	Dharmanagar	Rebati Tripura	BJP	21,252	Jitendra Chaudhury	CPI(M)	6,022	15,230
57	Jubarajnagar	Rebati Tripura	BJP	21,090	Jitendra Chaudhury	CPI(M)	6,601	14,489
58	Panisagar	Rebati Tripura	BJP	15,559	Jitendra Chaudhury	CPI(M)	7,225	8,334
59	Pencharthal	Rebati Tripura	BJP	15,682	Jitendra Chaudhury	CPI(M)	7,814	7,868
60	Kanchanpur	Rebati Tripura	BJP	12,772	Jitendra Chaudhury	CPI(M)	9,185	3,587
