= Paul Dangshu =

Indian politician from Tripura

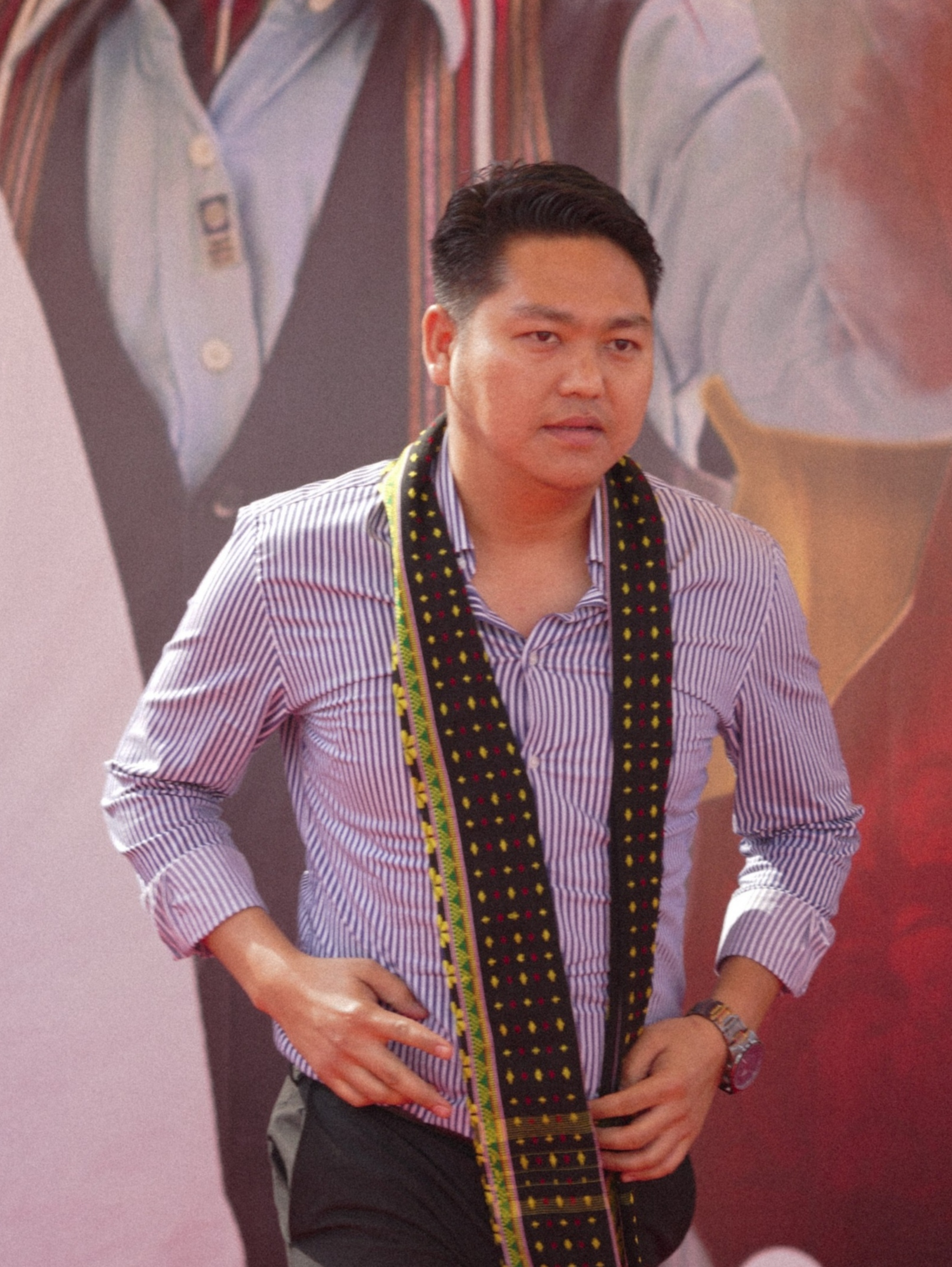
- Dangshu in 2024

Member of the Tripura Legislative Assembly
- Incumbent
- Assumed office 2023
- Preceded by: Diba Chandra Hrangkhawl
- Constituency: Karamcherra

Personal details
- Born: 20 March 1992 (age 34) Agartala, Tripura, India
- Party: Tipra Motha Party
- Committees: • Member, Public Accounts Committee, Tripura Legislative Assembly (2023-present) •Member, House Committee, Tripura Legislative Assembly (2023–2024)

Paul Dangshu (born 20 March 1992), is an Indian politician from Tripura, India. He won the 2023 Tripura Legislative Assembly election as a candidate of the Tipra Motha Party and became member of the Tripura Legislative Assembly from the Karamcherra assembly constituency.

== Political career ==
=== Early years ===
Paul has been the lead media in charge of the TIPRA Motha party for the past few years since its formation in 2020.

=== MLA in Tripura Assembly ===
In 2023, Paul contested the Tripura Assembly Election after he was put forward by TIPRA as one of its young faces. He won against the veteran BJP candidate Brajalal Tripura and BJP turned Congress peloton Diba Chandra Hrangkhawl by securing 20,496 votes, 52.73% of the total votes.

== Electoral performance ==
Tripura Legislative Assembly Election, 2023: Karmachhara
Party	Candidate	Votes	%	±%
TMP	Paul Dangshu	20,496	52.73%	+52.73
BJP	Braja Lal Tripura	9,901	25.47%	+25.47%
INC	Diba Chandra Hrangkhawl	7, 344	18.89%	−36.55%
Majority		10,595		−2.71%
Turnout		38,504	89.65 %	
TMP gain from BJP		Swing	52.73%	
