= Tripura East Lok Sabha constituency =

Lok Sabha Constituency in Tripura

Coordinates: 24.04°N 92.02°E

Tripura East TR-2
- Lok Sabha constituency
- Interactive Map Outlining Tripura East Lok Sabha constituency

Constituency details
- Country: India
- Region: Northeast India
- State: Tripura
- Assembly constituencies: 30: (District - KHOWAI) Ramchandraghat (ST), Khowai, Asharambari (ST), Kalyanpur-Pramodenagar, Teliamura, Krishnapur (ST), (District - SOUTH TRIPURA) Hrishyamukh, Jolaibari (ST), Manu (ST), Sabroom, (District - GOMATI) Ampinagar (ST), Amarpur, Karbook (ST), (District - DHALAI) Raima Valley (ST), Kamalpur, Surma (SC), Ambassa (ST), Karamcherra (ST), Chawamanu (ST), (District - UNAKOTI) Pabiachhara (SC), Fatikroy (SC), Chandipur, Kailashahar, (District - NORTH TRIPURA) Kadamtala-Kurti, Bagbassa, Dharmanagar, Jubarajnagar, Panisagar, Pencharthal (ST) and Kanchanpur (ST)
- Established: 1952
- Reservation: ST

Member of Parliament
- 18th Lok Sabha
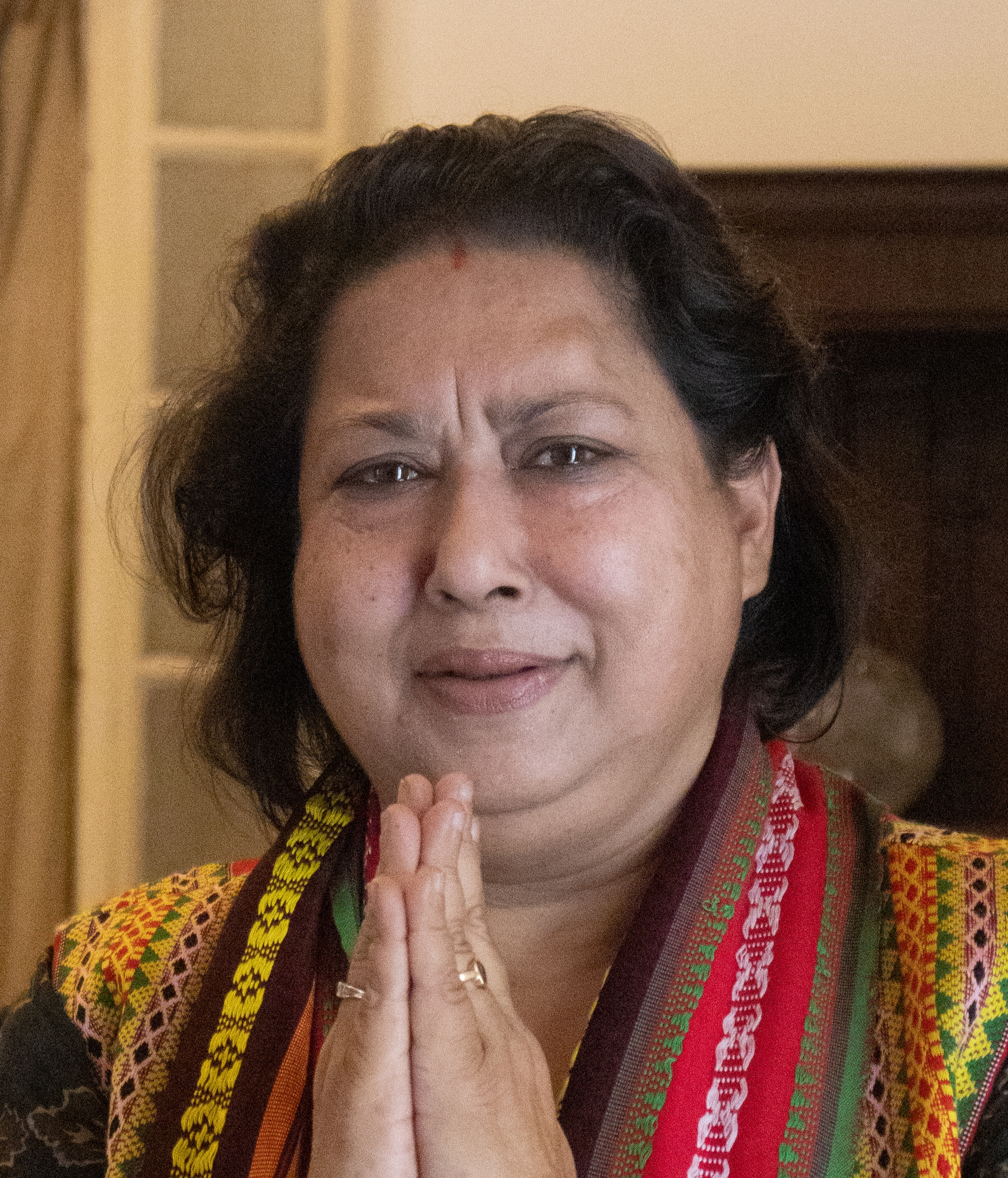
- Incumbent Kriti Devi Debbarman
- Party: BJP
- Alliance: NDA
- Elected year: 2024

Tripura East Lok Sabha constituency is one of the two Lok Sabha constituencies in Tripura state in northeastern India. The seat is reserved for scheduled tribes. In the first elections in 1952 the seat was represented by Dasarath Debbarma.

The most successful party in the Lok Sabha elections
1. Communist Party of India (17.6%)
2. Communist Party of India (Marxist) (52.9%)
3. Indian National Congress (23.5%)
4. Bharatiya Janata Party (5.88%)

== Assembly segments ==
Tripura East Lok Sabha constituency is composed of the following assembly segments:

No	Name	District	Member	Party	2024 lead
24	Ramchandraghat (ST)	Khowai	Ranjit Debbarma	Tipra Motha Party	Bharatiya Janata Party
25	Khowai	Khowai	Nirmal Biswas	Communist Party of India (Marxist)	Bharatiya Janata Party
26	Asharambari (ST)	Khowai	Animesh Debbarma	Tipra Motha Party	Bharatiya Janata Party
27	Kalyanpur-Pramodenagar	Khowai	Pinaki Das Choudhuri	Bharatiya Janata Party	Bharatiya Janata Party
28	Teliamura (ST)	Khowai	Kalyani Roy	Bharatiya Janata Party	Bharatiya Janata Party
29	Krishanpur (ST)	Khowai	Bikash Debbarma	Bharatiya Janata Party	Bharatiya Janata Party
37	Hrishyamukh	South Tripura	Asoke Chandra Mitra	Communist Party of India (Marxist)	Bharatiya Janata Party
38	Jolaibari (ST)	South Tripura	Shukla Charan Noatia	Indigenous People's Front of Tripura	Bharatiya Janata Party
39	Manu (ST)	South Tripura	Mailafru Mog	Bharatiya Janata Party	Bharatiya Janata Party
40	Sabroom	South Tripura	Jitendra Chaudhury	Communist Party of India (Marxist)	Bharatiya Janata Party
41	Ampinagar (ST)	Gomati	Pathan Lal Jamatia	Tipra Motha Party	Bharatiya Janata Party
42	Amarpur	Gomati	Ranjit Das	Bharatiya Janata Party	Bharatiya Janata Party
43	Karbook (ST)	Gomati	Sanjoy Manik Tripura	Tipra Motha Party	Bharatiya Janata Party
44	Raima Valley (ST)	Dhalai	Nandita Debbarma	Tipra Motha Party	Bharatiya Janata Party
45	Kamalpur	Dhalai	Manoj Kanti Deb	Bharatiya Janata Party	Bharatiya Janata Party
46	Surma (SC)	Dhalai	Swapna Das Paul	Bharatiya Janata Party	Bharatiya Janata Party
47	Ambassa (ST)	Dhalai	Chitta Ranjan Debbarma	Tipra Motha Party	Bharatiya Janata Party
48	Karamcherra (ST)	Dhalai	Paul Dangshu	Tipra Motha Party	Bharatiya Janata Party
49	Chawamanu (ST)	Dhalai	Sambhu Lal Chakma	Bharatiya Janata Party	Bharatiya Janata Party
50	Pabiachhara (SC)	Unakoti	Bhagaban Das	Bharatiya Janata Party	Bharatiya Janata Party
51	Fatikroy (SC)	Unakoti	Sudhangshu Das	Bharatiya Janata Party	Bharatiya Janata Party
52	Chandipur	Unakoti	Tinku Roy	Bharatiya Janata Party	Bharatiya Janata Party
53	Kailashahar	Unakoti	Birajit Sinha	Indian National Congress	Communist Party of India (Marxist)
54	Kadamtala-Kurti	North Tripura	Islam Uddin	Communist Party of India (Marxist)	Bharatiya Janata Party
55	Bagbassa	North Tripura	Jadab Lal Debnath	Bharatiya Janata Party	Bharatiya Janata Party
56	Dharmanagar	North Tripura	Jahar Chakraborti	Bharatiya Janata Party	Bharatiya Janata Party
57	Jubarajnagar	North Tripura	Sailendra Chandra Nath	Communist Party of India (Marxist)	Bharatiya Janata Party
58	Panisagar	North Tripura	Binay Bhushan Das	Bharatiya Janata Party	Bharatiya Janata Party
59	Pencharthal (ST)	North Tripura	Santana Chakma	Bharatiya Janata Party	Bharatiya Janata Party
60	Kanchanpur (ST)	North Tripura	Philip Kumar Reang	Tipra Motha Party	Bharatiya Janata Party

== Members of Parliament ==
Year	Member	Party
1952	Dasarath Deb	Communist Party of India
1957	Dasarath Deb	Communist Party of India
1962	Dasarath Deb	Communist Party of India
1967	Kirit Bikram Kishore Deb Barman	Indian National Congress
1971	Dasarath Deb	Communist Party of India (Marxist)
1977	Kirit Bikram Kishore Deb Barman	Indian National Congress
1980	Baju Ban Riyan	Communist Party of India (Marxist)
1984	Baju Ban Riyan	Communist Party of India (Marxist)
1989	Kirit Bikram Kishore Deb Barman	Indian National Congress
1991	Bibhu Kumari Devi	Indian National Congress
1996	Baju Ban Riyan	Communist Party of India (Marxist)
1998	Baju Ban Riyan	Communist Party of India (Marxist)
1999	Baju Ban Riyan	Communist Party of India (Marxist)
2004	Baju Ban Riyan	Communist Party of India (Marxist)
2009	Baju Ban Riyan	Communist Party of India (Marxist)
2014	Jitendra Choudhury	Communist Party of India (Marxist)
2019	Rebati Tripura	Bharatiya Janata Party
2024	Kriti Devi Debbarma	Bharatiya Janata Party

== Election results ==
Vote share of Winning candidates
2024	69.66%
2019	46.09%
2014	65.47%
2009	63.47%
2004	66.48%
1999	54.82%
1998	50.30%
1996	54.35%
1991	82.06%
1989	49.30%
1984	52.40%
1980	48.19%
1977	47.64%
1971	41.98%
1967	58.74%
1962	50.38%
1957	24.18%
1957	23.37%
1952	53.91%

=== 2024 ===
2024 Indian general election: Tripura East (ST)
Party	Candidate	Votes	%	±%
BJP	Kriti Devi Debbarman	777,447	69.66	▲23.57
CPI(M)	Rajendra Reang	290,628	26.04	▲6.83
NOTA	None of the Above	18,303	1.64	▲0.57
Majority		486,819	43.62	▲24.09
Turnout		1,122,424 (Note: does not include postal ballots)	80.36	▼2.54
BJP hold		Swing		

=== 2019 ===
2019 Indian general election: Tripura East (ST)
Party	Candidate	Votes	%	±%
BJP	Rebati Tripura	482,126	46.09	▲39.73
INC	Pragya Debburman	277,836	26.56	▲11.93
CPI(M)	Jitendra Chaudhury	200,963	19.21	▼46.26
IPFT	Narendra Chandra Debbarma	45,304	4.33	▲3.25
AMB	Karnadhan Chakma	6,944	0.66	▲0.22
IND	Bijoy Debbarma	5,276	0.50	
IND	Subir Kumar Jamatia	4,581	0.44	
IND	Dipti Halam	3,839	0.37	
IND	Amar Debbarma	3,706	0.35	
IND	Chitta Ranjan Debbarma	3,628	0.35	
NOTA	None of the Above	11,214	1.07	▼0.09
Majority		204,290	19.53	▼31.31
Turnout		1,046,123	82.90	▼0.51
Swing to BJP from CPI(M)		Swing		

=== 2014 ===
2014 Indian general election: Tripura East (ST)
Party	Candidate	Votes	%	±%
CPI(M)	Jitendra Chaudhury	623,771	65.47	▲2.00
INC	Sachitra Debbarma	139,413	14.63	▼12.84
AITC	Bhriguram Reang	77,028	8.08	▲7.57
BJP	Parikshit Debbarma	60,613	6.36	▲2.22
IPFT	Narendra Chandra Deb Barma	10,286	1.08	
AAP	Karna Bijoy Jamatia	4,871	0.51	
CPI(ML)L	Falguni Tripura	4,444	0.47	▼0.13
TPGC (Note: Tripura Pragatishil Gramin Congress)	Basu Mog	4,262	0.45	
AMB	Subarna Mala Debbarma	4,152	0.44	▼0.84
JMBP (Note: Jai Maha Bharath Party)	Bikash Debbarma	3,086	0.32	
IND	Prabiddha Reang	5,066	0.53	
IND	Patal Kanya Jamatia	3,004	0.32	
NOTA	None of the Above	11,084	1.16	
Majority		484,358	50.84	▲14.84
Turnout		951,080	83.41	▲0.35
CPI(M) hold		Swing		

=== 2009 ===
2009 Indian general election: Tripura East (ST)
Party	Candidate	Votes	%	±%
CPI(M)	Baju Ban Riyan	521,084	63.47	▼3.01
INC	Diba Chandra Hrangkhawl	225,503	27.47	▲15.12
BJP	Pulin Behari Dewan	33,989	4.14	▼12.47
AMB	Karna Dhan Chakma	10,468	1.28	▲0.01
CPI(ML)L	Falguni Tripura	4,886	0.60	▼0.44
AITC	Rita Rani Debbarma	4,191	0.51	
IND	Rajesh Debbarma	9,962	1.21	
IND	Binoy Reang	6,256	0.76	
IND	Mevar Kumar Jamatia	4,645	0.57	
Majority		295,581	36.00	▼13.87
Turnout		820,984	83.06	
CPI(M) hold		Swing		

=== 2004 ===
2004 Indian general election: Tripura East (ST)
Party	Candidate	Votes	%	±%
CPI(M)	Baju Ban Riyan	414,230	66.48	▲11.66
BJP	Pulin Bihari Dewan	103,494	16.61	▼11.15
INC	Jadu Mohan Tripura	76,927	12.35	▼2.71
IND	Dija Raj Tripura	14,027	2.25	
AMB	Karna Dhan Chakma	7,941	1.27	▲0.24
CPI(ML)L	Charai Muni Jamatia	6,475	1.04	
Majority		310,736	49.87	▲22.81
Turnout		623,094		
CPI(M) hold		Swing		

=== 1999 ===
1999 Indian general election: Tripura East (ST)
Party	Candidate	Votes	%	±%
CPI(M)	Baju Ban Riyan	304,934	54.82	▲4.52
BJP	Jishnu Dev Varma	154,434	27.76	▲18.06
INC	Kashiram Reang	83,789	15.06	▼23.84
IND	Debabrata Koloy	7,343	1.32	
AMB	Samarendra Chakma	5,751	1.03	▲0.25
Majority		150,500	27.06	▲15.66
Turnout		564,376	66.03	▼13.12
CPI(M) hold		Swing		

=== 1998 ===
1998 Indian general election: Tripura East (ST)
Party	Candidate	Votes	%	±%
CPI(M)	Baju Ban Riyan	320,766	50.30	▼4.05
INC	Drao Kumar Reang	248,080	38.90	▲10.14
BJP	Jishnu Dev Varma	61,840	9.70	▲1.38
AMB	Madhuri Kalai (Rudrapaul)	4,972	0.78	▼1.37
IND	Dija Raj Tripura	1,999	0.31	
Majority		72,686	11.40	▼14.19
Turnout		651,186	79.15	▲1.49
CPI(M) hold		Swing		

=== 1996 ===
1996 Indian general election: Tripura East (ST)
Party	Candidate	Votes	%	±%
CPI(M)	Baju Ban Riyan	327,929	54.35	▲47.66
INC	Kashiram Reang	173,560	28.76	▼53.30
BJP	Jishnu Dev Varma	50,197	8.32	▲5.12
TUS	Gourisankar Reang	28,367	4.70	
AMB	Madhuri Kalai (Rudrapal)	12,976	2.15	▼2.80
AIIC(T)	Maharani Bibhu Kumari Devi	4,928	0.82	
IND	Debendra Malsom	3,033	0.50	
IND	Alindra Debbarma	1,352	0.22	
CPI(ML)L	Charaimuni Jamatia	1,060	0.18	▼1.11
Majority		154,369	25.59	▼49.78
Turnout		612,132	77.66	▲13.43
Swing to CPI(M) from INC		Swing		

=== 1991 ===
1991 Indian general election: Tripura East (ST)
Party	Candidate	Votes	%	±%
INC	Bibhu Kumari Devi	377,436	82.06	▲32.76
CPI(M)	Baju Ban Riyan	30,783	6.69	▼41.20
AMB	Minati Roy	22,762	4.95	▲3.23
BJP	Nakshatra Bikram Debbarma	14,697	3.20	
IND	Ananta Debbarma	7,186	1.56	
CPI(M-L)	Debendra Malsom	5,915	1.29	
IPF	Kamal Singh Jamatta	1,157	0.25	
Majority		346,653	75.37	▲73.96
Turnout		477,132	64.23	▼17.62
INC hold		Swing		

=== 1989 ===
1989 Indian general election: Tripura East (ST)
Party	Candidate	Votes	%	±%
INC	Kirit Bikram Kishore Deb Barman	292,190	49.30	▲6.22
CPI(M)	Baju Ban Riyan	283,789	47.89	▼4.51
AMB	Sudhangshu Sen	10,202	1.72	
IND	Debendra Malsom	5,124	0.86	
IND	Akshayananda Uchai	1,323	0.22	
Majority		8,401	1.41	▼7.91
Turnout		600,724	81.85	▲5.49
Swing to INC from CPI(M)		Swing		

=== 1984 ===
1984 Indian general election: Tripura East (ST)
Party	Candidate	Votes	%	±%
CPI(M)	Baju Ban Riyan	231,023	52.40	▲4.21
INC	Kirit Bikram Kishore Deb Barman	189,960	43.08	▲32.07
IND	Sneha Kumar Chakma	14,671	3.33	
IND	Niranjan Deb Barma	5,247	1.19	
Majority		41,063	9.32	▼13.74
Turnout		448,147	76.36	▼3.02
CPI(M) hold		Swing		

=== 1980 ===
1980 Indian general election: Tripura East (ST)
Party	Candidate	Votes	%	±%
CPI(M)	Baju Ban Riyan	196,199	48.19	▲5.24
IND	Ratnaprava Das	102,293	25.13	
TUS	Shyama Charan Tripura	61,398	15.08	▲10.36
INC(I)	Kashi Ram Reang	44,819	11.01	▼36.63
JP	Hangsadwaj Dewan	2,395	0.59	
Majority		93,906	23.06	▲18.37
Turnout		414,540	79.38	▲12.48
Swing to CPI(M) from INC		Swing		

=== 1977 ===
1977 Indian general election: Tripura East (ST)
Party	Candidate	Votes	%	±%
INC	Kirit Bikram Kishore Deb Barman	133,907	47.64	▲15.53
CPI(M)	Dasarath Deb	120,724	42.95	▲0.97
TUS	Bijoy Kumar Harangkhawl	13,255	4.72	
CPI	Aghore Deb Barma	13,180	4.69	▼0.70
Majority		13,183	4.69	▼5.18
Turnout		291,091	66.90	▲4.24
Swing to INC from CPI(M)		Swing		

=== 1971 ===
1971 Indian general election: Tripura East (ST)
Party	Candidate	Votes	%	±%
CPI(M)	Dasarath Deb	91,192	41.98	▲0.72
INC	Ramendra Kishore Deb Barma	69,750	32.11	▼26.63
IND	Kishore Deb Barma Bahadur	44,559	20.51	
CPI	Birchandra Deb Barma	11,706	5.39	
Majority		21,442	9.87	▼17.48
Turnout		226,116	62.66	▼11.52
Swing to CPI(M) from INC		Swing		

=== 1967 ===
1967 Indian general election: Tripura East (ST)
Party	Candidate	Votes	%	±%
INC	Kirit Bikram Kishore Deb Barman	129,618	58.74	▲14.89
CPI(M)	Dasarath Deb	91,032	41.26	
Majority		38,586	17.48	▲10.95
Turnout		226,756	74.18	▲8.37
Swing to INC from CPI		Swing		

=== 1962 ===
1962 Indian general election: Tripura East (ST)
Party	Candidate	Votes	%	±%
CPI	Dasaratha Deb	77,539	50.38	
INC	Jitendra Mohan Deb Barma	67,491	43.85	
EIT (Note: Eastern Indian Tribal Union)	Sneha Kumar Chakma	8,887	5.77	
Majority		10,048	6.53	
Turnout		157,624	65.81	
CPI hold		Swing		

=== 1957 ===
For this election Tripura became one Lok Sabha constituency with two representatives in parliament. The two representatives were Dasarath Deb of the Communist Party of India and Bangshi Deb Barma of the Indian National Congress.

1957 Indian general election: Tripura (2 seats)
Party	Candidate	Votes	%	±%
INC	Deb Barma Bangshi	133,078	24.18	
CPI	Deb Dasaratha	128,624	23.37	
INC	Singh Umesh Lal	120,163	21.83	
CPI	Dutta Birendra	119,798	21.77	
IND	Choudhury Jogendra Kumar	25,227	4.58	
IND	Deb Barma Lalit Mohan	15,806	2.87	
IND	Chakma Sneha Kumar	7,642	1.39	
Turnout		550,338	63.56	

=== 1952 ===
1951–52 Indian general election: Tripura East
Party	Candidate	Votes	%	±%
CPI	Dasarath Deb	42,866	53.91	
INC	Sachindra Lal Singh	29,650	37.29	
ABJS	Nagendra Chaudhary	7,004	8.81	
Majority		13,216	16.62	
Turnout		79,520	44.27	
CPI win (new seat)				

== See also ==
- List of constituencies of the Lok Sabha
