= Sudhan Das =

Indian politician

Member of the Tripura Legislative Assembly
- In office 1993–2023
- Preceded by: Nakul Das
- Succeeded by: Swapna Majumder
- Constituency: Rajnagar

Personal details
- Born: January 5, 1961 (age 65) Rajanagar
- Party: Communist Party of India (Marxist)
- Spouse: Jaya Banerjee
- Parents: Surya Kanta Das (father); Kamala Das (mother)
- Education: Higher Secondary
- Profession: Politician

Sudhan Das is an Indian politician from Tripura, India. He is a member of Communist Party of India (Marxist). He was a member of the Tripura Legislative Assembly from 1993 to 2023 representing Rajnagar.

== Political career ==
Das started his political career as a student leader, having been involved with student and youth movement for 16 years. Later he became a member of the CPI(M). In 1988 he became local secretary of the Shrirampur CPI (M) local committee. In the 1993 Tripura Legislative Assembly election he first ran for office and was elected on the CPI(M) ticket, and would go on to be re-elected for 6 consecutive terms. In 2008 he was elected as a member of the Communist Party of India (Marxist) – Tripura state committee. In the 2023 Tripura Legislative Assembly election he lost to the BJP candidate Swapna Majumder by a margin of 1,335. In 2024 Tripura Rajyasabha by-election he filed his nomination as a CPI(M) candidate, but he lost to BJP candidate Rajib Bhattacharjee.
