= Binay Bhushan Das =

Indian politician

Member of the Tripura Legislative Assembly
- Incumbent
- Assumed office 2018
- Preceded by: Subodh Das
- Constituency: Panisagar (Vidhan Sabha constituency)

Personal details
- Born: 16 November 1959 (age 66) Jalabasa, North Tripura
- Party: Bharatiya Janata Party

Binay Bhushan Das (born 16 November 1959) is an Indian politician belonging to the Bharatiya Janata Party (BJP). He was elected as a member of the Tripura Legislative Assembly from Panisagar.

== Early life and political career ==
Bhushan was born on 16 November 1959 in Jalabasa, North Tripura to Birendra Kumar Das and Droupadi Das. He has Bachelor of Arts and Bachelor of Laws degrees. Bhushan married Sagata Das and has one son and one daughter: Bishal Das and Sneha Das.

In 2018, he contested the 2018 Legislative Assembly election on a BJP ticket against CPM’s Subodh Das. He secured 49.88% of the votes polled and won by 15,892 votes.
