= Bibhu Kumari Devi =

Indian politician

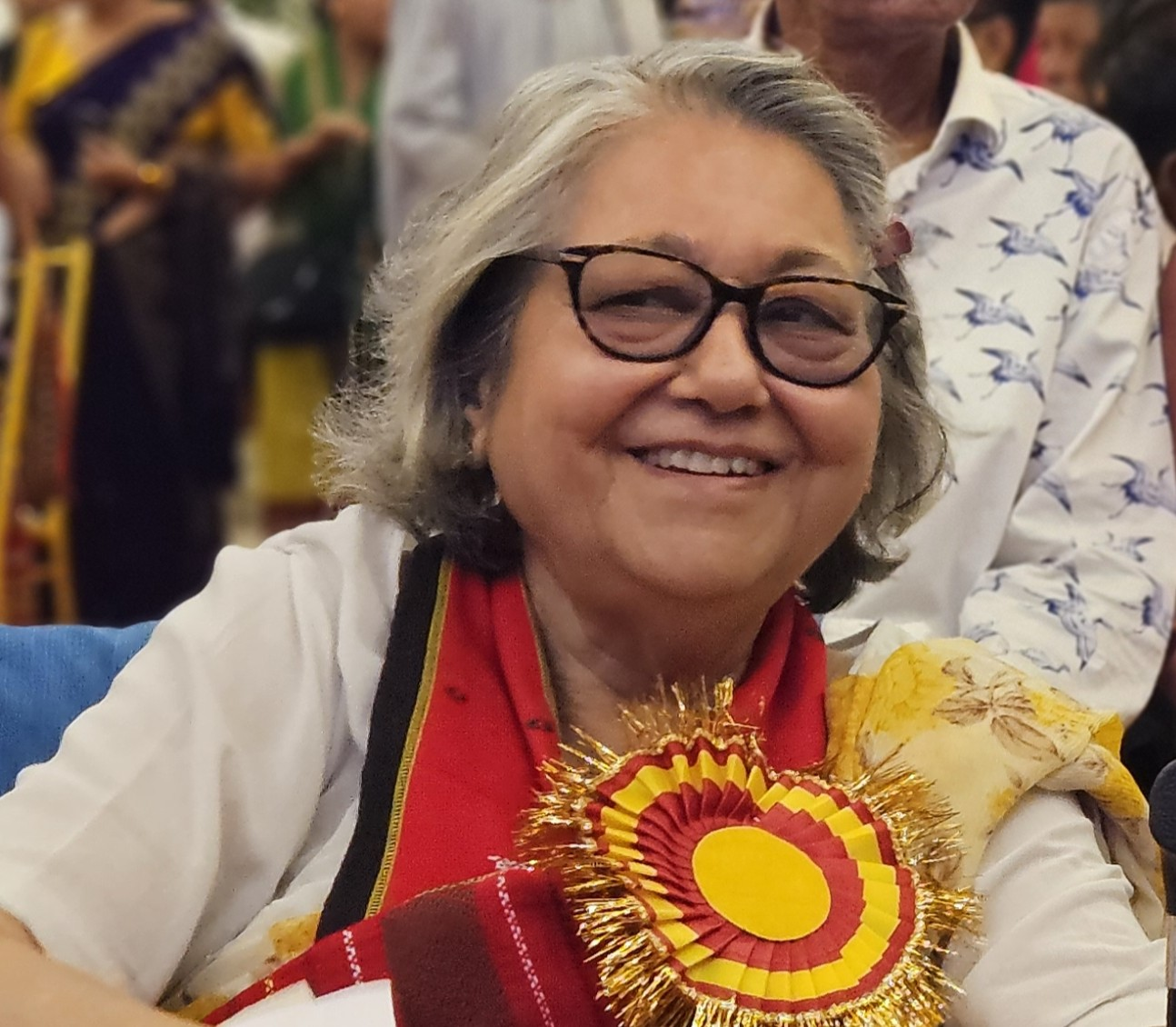
- Rajmata Bibhu Kumari Devi in 2025

Rajmata of Tripura Royal Family
- Preceded by: Kanchan Prava Devi

Member of All India Congress Committee
- In office 1991

Member of Lok Sabha, Tripura East
- In office 20 June 1991 – 10 May 1996
- Preceded by: Kirit Bikram Deb Barman (INC)
- Succeeded by: Baju Ban Riyan (CPIM)

Member of Tripura Legislative Assembly
- In office 1988–1993
- Preceded by: Manik Sarkar
- Succeeded by: Nripen Chakraborty
- Constituency: Agartala Assembly constituency

Cabinet Minister, Department of Revenue and Local Self Government, Government of Tripura
- In office 1989–1991

Personal details
- Born: 28 June 1944 (age 82) Mussoorie, United Provinces, British India
- Spouse: Kirit Bikram Kishore Deb Barman
- Children: 3, including Pradyot Bikram Manikya Deb Barma and Kriti Devi Debbarman
- Relatives: Bir Bikram Kishore Debbarman (daughter-in-law); Jishnu Dev Varma (sister-in-law)
- Education: Isabella Thoburn College, Lucknow University (BA)

Bibhu Kumari Devi (born 28 June 1944), is the current matriarch and head of the former ruling family of Tripura, politician of the Indian National Congress and former member of the 10th Lok Sabha. She is also the first woman Member of Parliament from Tripura.

== Early life ==
Bibhu Kumari Devi was born on 28 June 1944 in Mussoorie, United Provinces (now in Uttarakhand), to Raja Lav Shah and Bibhu Kumari. She is the daughter-in-law of Bir Bikram Kishore Debbarman and graduated from the Isabella Thoburn College in Lucknow.

== Political career ==
Rajmata Devi was a member of the Indian National Congress (INC) and entered the Tripura Legislative Assembly in 1983 after defeating former Tripura chief minister Manik Sarkar in the 6-Agartala Assembly constituency seat. The same year she was included in the All India Congress Committee. From 1989 to 1991, she served as the Minister for Revenue and Local Self-Government in the Tripura state government. In 1991, the INC made her its candidate for the 1991 general elections from the Tripura East constituency reserved for scheduled tribes. She defeated Baju Ban Riyan of the Communist Party of India (Marxist) to become a member of the 10th Lok Sabha.

In 1998, Devi refused to contest the Tripura legislative elections after the party fielded her for the Matabari seat.

== Personal life ==
Devi married the last King of Tripura, Kirit Bikram Kishore Deb Barman from whom she had one son and two daughters. Her husband Maharaja Kirit and her son Pradyot Bikram Manikya Deb Barma were also members of the INC. Presently, her son Pradyot Manikya Deb Barma is the founder and chairman of Tipra Motha Party. The daughter Kriti Devi Debbarman is the current Member of Parliament in the Lok Sabha representing the Tripura East constituency. Another daughter, Pragya Debbarma, is a cultural activist presently working as the convenor of the INTACH Tripura Chapter.

In 2015, a local court in Tripura ordered the state government to hand over Neermahal palace and Rudrasagar Lake to Devi.

== Positions held ==
- Cabinet Minister, Revenue and Local Self Government, Government of Tripura, (1989-1991).
- Member, Committee on Public Undertakings (COPU), 10th Lok Sabha, (1992-1993)
- Member, High Level Committee to make recommendations on the salient features of the Iaw for extending the provisions of the Constitution (73rd Amendment) Act. 1992 to the Scheduled Areas.
