= Dilip Sarkar (Tripura politician) =

Indian politician (1958–2019)

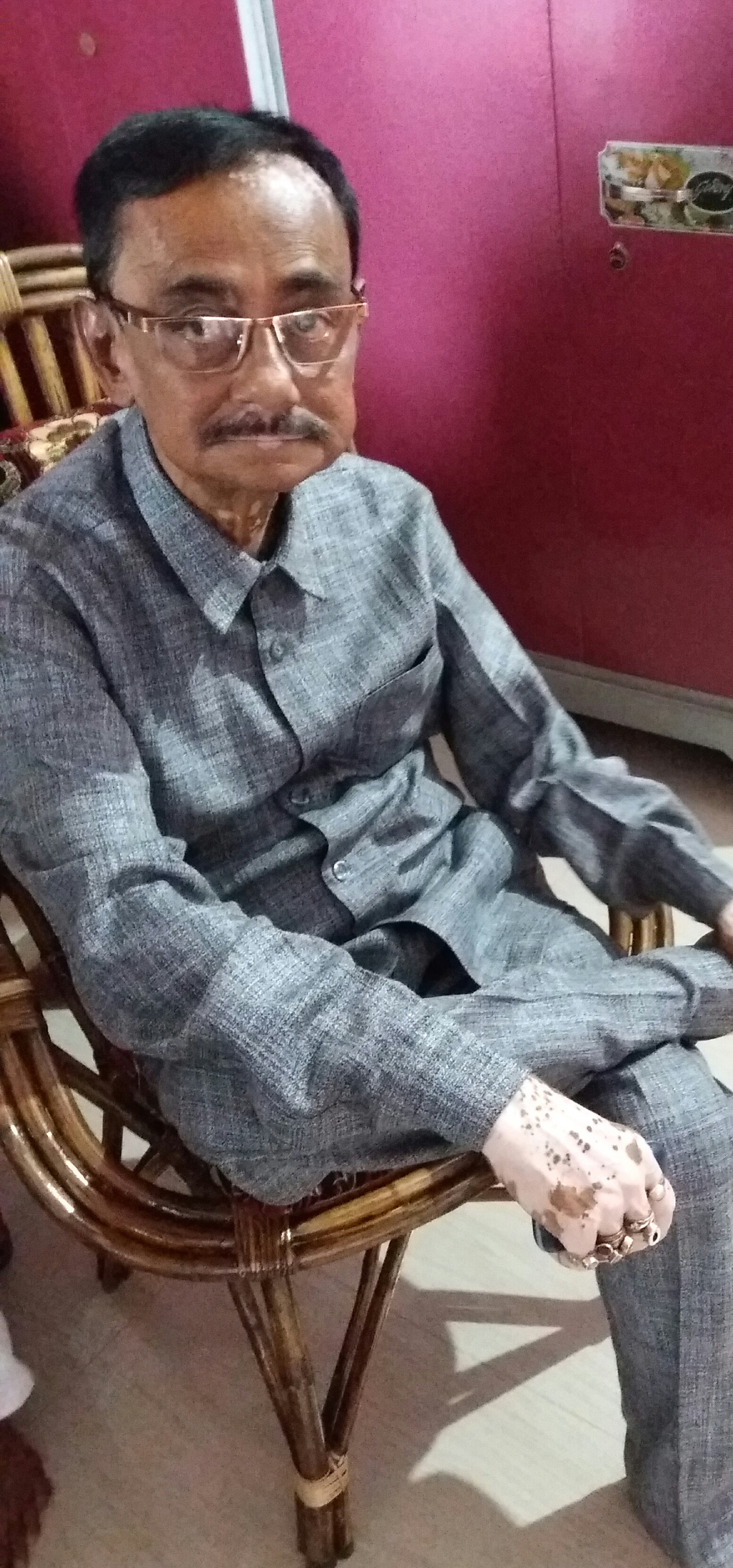

Member of Tripura Legislative Assembly
- In office 2008–2019
- Preceded by: Subrata Chakrabarty
- Succeeded by: Mimi Majumder
- Constituency: Badharghat
- In office 1998–2003
- Preceded by: Jadab Majumdar
- Succeeded by: Subrata Chakrabarty
- Constituency: Badharghat
- In office 1988–1993
- Preceded by: Jadab Majumdar
- Succeeded by: Jadab Majumdar
- Constituency: Badharghat

Personal details
- Born: 1958
- Died: 1 April 2019 (aged 60–61) Delhi, India
- Party: Bharatiya Janata Party (2017 - 2019)
- Other political affiliations: Indian National Congress (Before 2016); All India Trinamool Congress (2016 - 2017)

Dilip Sarkar (1958 – April 1, 2019) was an Indian politician from the state of Tripura. Following the 2013 Legislative Assembly elections, he represented the Badharghat constituency in West Tripura district in the Tripura Legislative Assembly.

== Political career ==
In 2016, he was one of the six MLAs from the Indian National Congress who joined the All India Trinamool Congress, due to dissatisfaction over the INC allying with the Communist Party of India (Marxist) in the 2016 West Bengal Legislative Assembly election.

In August 2017, he joined the Bharatiya Janata Party after they voted against party lines in the 2017 Indian presidential election.

In the 2018 election he stood in Badharghat again as the BJP Candidate against the CPI (M) candidate Jharna Das. Many CPI (M) leaders from Badharghat, including former DYFI Bishalgarh Committee president and CPI (M) local committee member Bidhan Ch. Deb joined him. With their support he won the 2018 elections with a margin of 5,000 votes.

== Death ==
Dilip Sarkar died at a private hospital in Delhi on 1 April 2019 following a prolonged illness.
