= Mimi Majumder =

Indian politician

Member of Tripura Legislative Assembly
- In office 1 October 2019 – 2023
- Preceded by: Dilip Sarkar
- Succeeded by: Mina Rani Sarkar
- Constituency: Badharghat

Personal details
- Party: Bharatiya Janata Party

Mimi Majumder is an Indian politician belonging to Bharatiya Janata Party. She was elected as a member of the Tripura Legislative Assembly representing the Badharghat Vidhan Sabha constituency on 27 September 2019.
