= Anjan Das (politician) =

Indian politician

Member of Tripura Legislative Assembly
- In office 30 June 2015 – 08 March 2018
- Preceded by: Sudhir Das
- Succeeded by: Ashis Das
- Constituency: Surma

Chairman of Salema Panchayet Samiti
- In office 2004–2009

Personal details
- Born: November 1, 1973 (age 52) Kamalpur, Tripura
- Party: Communist Party of India (Marxist)
- Spouse: Rakhi Dey
- Education: Tripura University
- Occupation: Politician, Social Worker

Anjan Das (born 1 November 1973) is an Indian politician from Tripura. He was a member of the Tripura Legislative Assembly from the Surma Assembly constituency, which is reserved for Scheduled Castes, in Dhalai district. He was elected in a 2015 Tripura Legislative Assembly by-election, representing the Communist Party of India (Marxist).
