= Subodh Das (politician) =

Indian politician (1947–2019)

Panchayet Minister of Tripura Government
- In office 1993–2004

MLA of Panisagar
- In office 1977–2018

Personal details
- Born: 1 November 1947
- Died: 24 February 2019 (aged 71)
- Party: Communist Party of India (Marxist)
- Parent(s): Bihari Das (Father); Nalini Das (Mother)

Subodh Das was an Indian politician belonging to Communist Party of India (Marxist). He was elected as a member of the Tripura Legislative Assembly from Panisagar eight consecutive times.

== Biography ==
Das was born on 1 September 1947 in Habiganj, Sylhet to Bihari Das and Nolini Das. Later they moved to Tripura.

Das became a member of the Communist Party of India (Marxist) in 1965. He served as a member of the Tripura Legislative Assembly from Panisagar from 1977 to 2018. He also served as Panchayet Minister of the Tripura Government from 1993 to 2004. He was a member of the Communist Party of India (Marxist) Committee of Tripura from 1978 to 2013.

Das died on 24 February 2019 in G. P. Pant Hospital, Agartala.
