= Kriti Devi Debbarman =

Indian politician

- Official portrait, 2024

Member of Parliament, Lok Sabha
- Incumbent
- Assumed office 4 June 2024
- Preceded by: Rebati Tripura
- Constituency: Tripura East

Personal details
- Born: 3 June 1971 (age 55)
- Party: Bharatiya Janata Party
- Spouse: Yogeshwar Raj Singh (m. 2003)
- Relations: Pradyot Bikram Manikya Deb Barma (brother); Jishnu Dev Varma (uncle); Maikaleshwar Raj Singh (Son)
- Parents: Kirit Bikram Kishore Deb Barman (father); Bibhu Kumari Devi (mother)
- Education: "Tribhuvan" Sahkari University (Diploma)
- Committees: Member, Parliamentary Standing Committee on Empowerment of Women (April 2025–present); Member, Parliamentary Standing Committee on Chemicals and Fertilizers (September 2024–present)

Kriti Devi Debbarman is a member of Tripura Royal family and Indian politician from Tripura. She was elected as an MP from Tripura East Lok Sabha constituency. She was the joint candidate of Tipra Motha Party and Bharatiya Janata Party.

== Early life ==
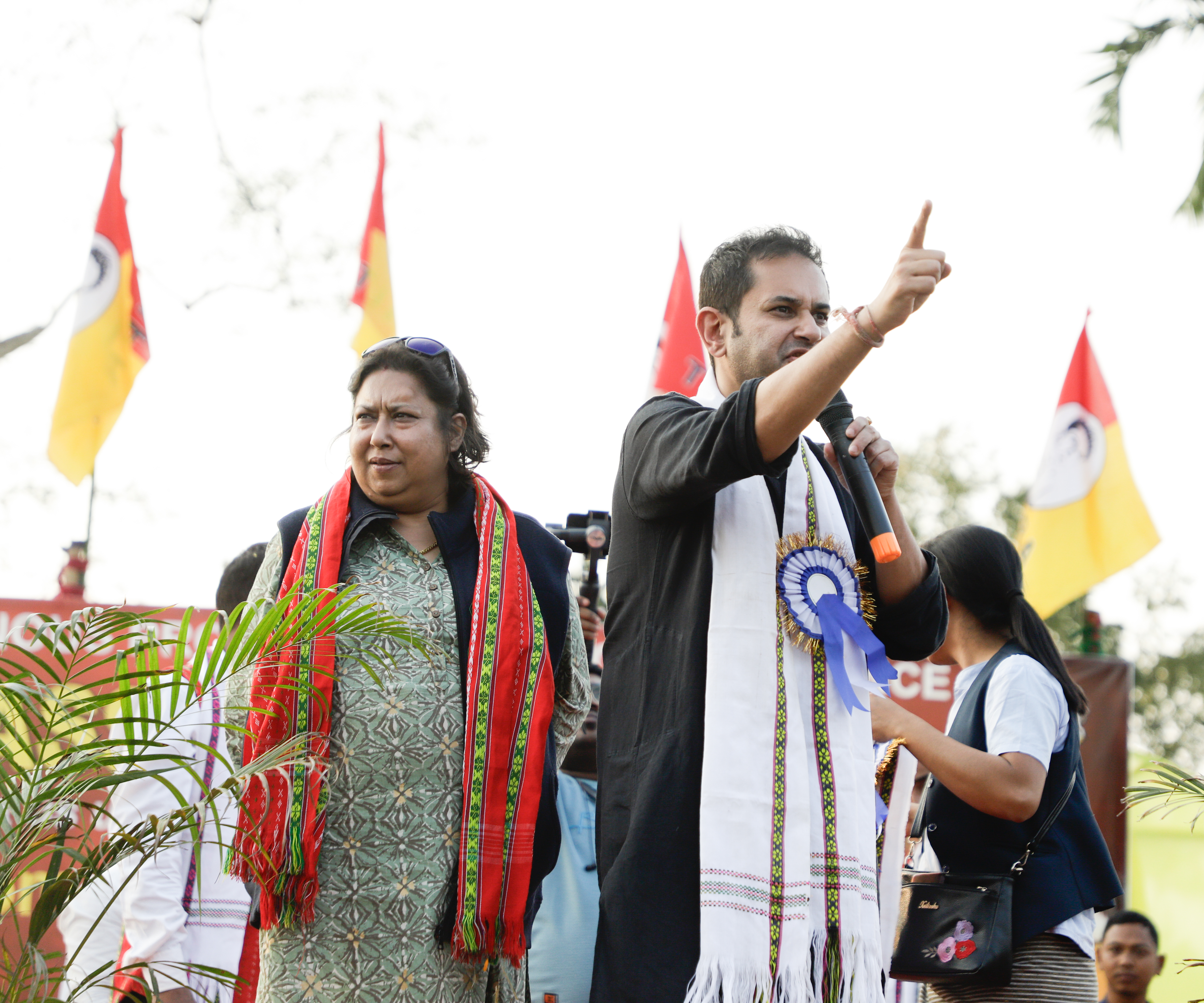
East Tripura Lok Sabha MP Kriti Devi Debbarma with her brother Pradyot Manikya in 2023

Maharajkumari Kriti Devi Debbarman (Rani Kriti Devi Singh of Kawardha) is the daughter of Maharaja Kirit Bikram Kishore Debbarma and Bibhu Kumar Devi. She have two siblings namely Pragya Debbarma and Pradyot Bikram Deb Barma, the current titular king of Tripura. She was married to RajaYogeshwar Raj Singh of the ErstwhilePrincely State of Kawardha,Chhattisgarh.

== Political career ==
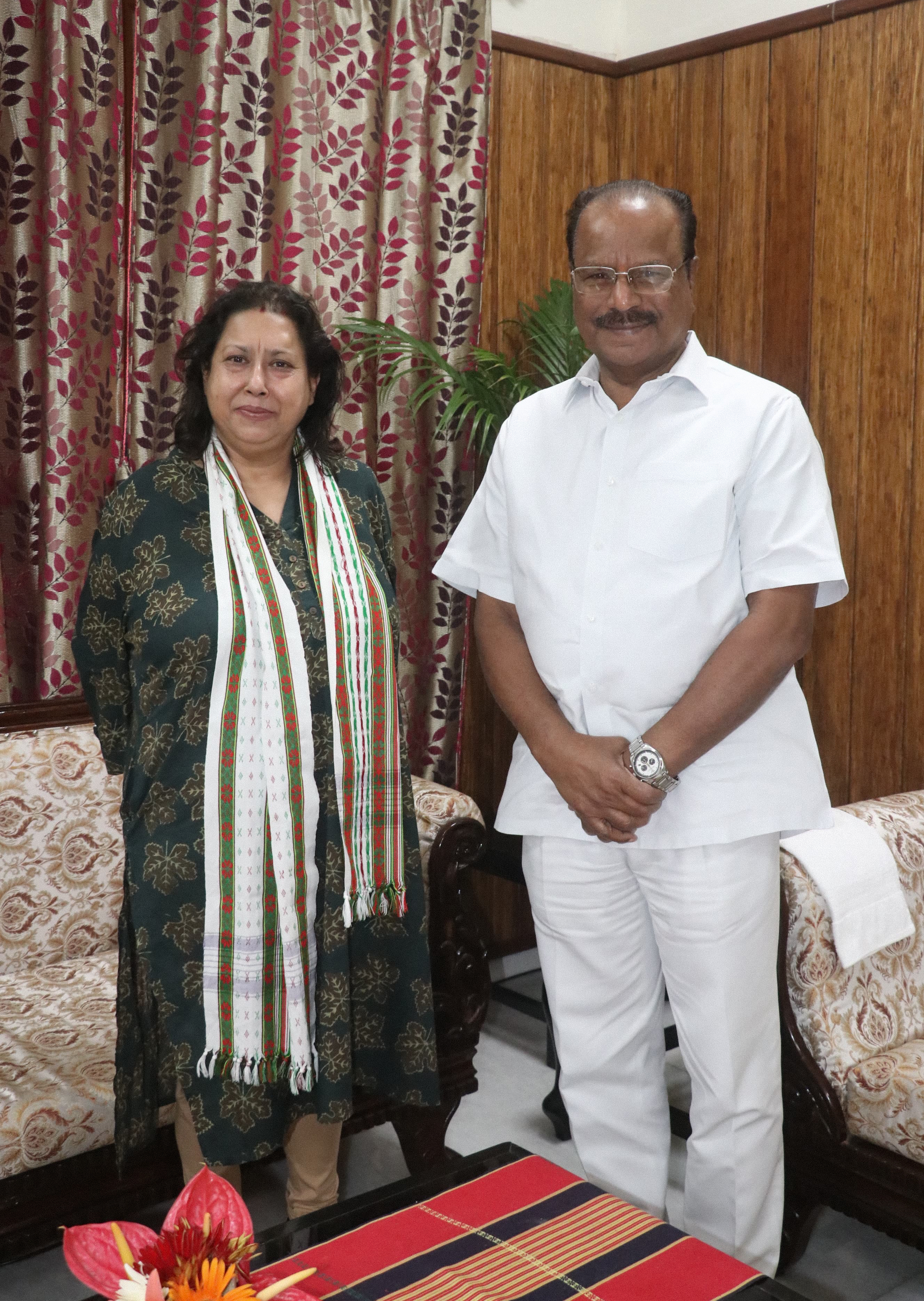
Kriti Devi Debbarman, the East Tripura 18th Lok Sabha Member of Parliament with Tripura Governor N. Indrasena Reddy on 5 June 2024.

Debbarma was elected as MP from the East Tripura constituency in the 18th Lok Sabha by a margin of 486,819 votes.

She as involved in the 2023 Tripura state assembly campaign and could be seen alongside his brother Pradyot Manikya.

After signing the Tiprasa Accord between Tipra Motha Party and Government of India for Constitutional Solution for Tiprasas; Debbarma was announced as the joint candidate.

Upon her becoming the member of parliament Lok Sabha, Debbarma was appointed as member of the parliamentary Standing Committee on Chemicals and Fertilizers on 26 September 2024.
