= Rebati Tripura =

17th Lok Sabha Member of Tripura

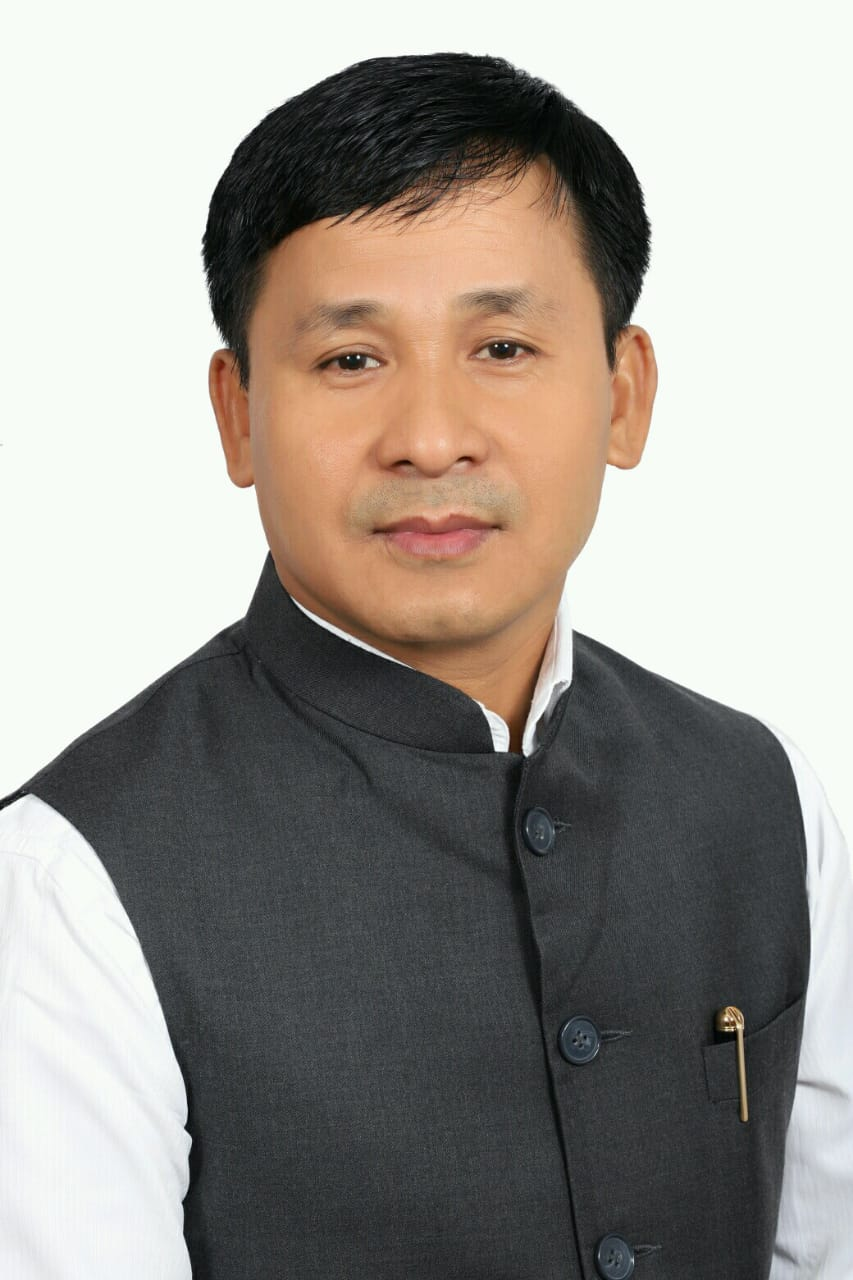
- Tripura official portrait, 2021

Member of the India Parliament
- In office 23 May 2019 – 04 June 2024
- Preceded by: Jitendra Chaudhury
- Succeeded by: Kriti Devi Debbarman
- Constituency: Tripura East

Member, Parliamentary Standing Committee on External Affairs
- In office 2019–2024
- Constituency: Tripura East

Personal details
- Born: 1 January 1976 (age 50) Durgapur, Dhalai, Tripura
- Party: BJP
- Spouse: Babita Tripura
- Children: 2
- Education: Tripura University MA
- Profession: Politician, Assistant Teacher, Writer

Rebati Tripura is an Indian politician from Tripura and has been elected to the Lok Sabha in 2019 from Tripura East (Lok Sabha constituency) as a National Democratic Alliance candidate. He belongs to Bharatiya Janata Party.

== Professional life ==
Rebati Tripura is currently seeking fund from Union Finance Minister Nirmala Sitharaman to allocate additional funds from the budget to Tripura Tribal Areas Autonomous District Council (TTAADC) for the welfare and development of the ethnic communities of the state.

== See also ==
- List of members of the 17th Lok Sabha
