= Mina Rani Sarkar =

Indian politician

Mina Rani Sarkar (born 1965) is an Indian politician from Tripura. She is a Member of the Tripura Legislative Assembly from the Badharghat Assembly constituency, which is a reserved constituency for the Scheduled Caste community in West Tripura district. She represents the Bharatiya Janata Party and was first elected in the 2023 Tripura Legislative Assembly election.

== Early life and education ==
Sarkar is from Badharghat, West Tripura. She completed her degree in arts in 1987 from the University of Calcutta.

== Career ==
Sarkar was elected in the 2023 Tripura Legislative Assembly election from the Badharghat Assembly constituency representing the Bharatiya Janata Party. She polled 27,427 votes and defeated her nearest rival, Partha Ranjan Sarkar of the AIFB, by a margin of 1,289 votes.
