= Khagen Das =

Indian politician (1937–2018)

Member of Parliament, Lok Sabha
- In office 2002–2014
- Preceded by: Samar Chowdhury
- Succeeded by: Sankar Prasad Datta
- Constituency: Tripura West

Member of parliament (Rajya Sabha) for Tripura
- In office 1998–2002

Minister for Revenue, Health and Statistics Government of Tripura
- In office 1983–1988

Member, Tripura Legislative Assembly
- In office 1978–1988

Personal details
- Born: 4 September 1937 Comilla, India
- Died: 21 January 2018 (aged 80) Kolkata
- Party: CPI(M)
- Spouse: Anupama Das
- Children: 2 daughters Kuntal Das, Bula Das, , Grandsons- Kaustubh Jha, Kinshuk Jha, Ayan Singh
- As of 16 September, 2006

Khagen Das (4 September 1937 – 21 January 2018) was a member of the 14th Lok Sabha of India. He represented the Tripura West constituency of Tripura and was a member of the Communist Party of India (Marxist).
