= Teliamura Assembly constituency =

Legislative Assembly constituency in Tripura State, India

Coordinates: 23.83°N 91.63°E

Teliamura
- Constituency No. 28 for the Tripura Legislative Assembly

Constituency details
- Country: India
- Region: Northeast India
- State: Tripura
- District: Khowai
- Lok Sabha constituency: Tripura East
- Established: 1967
- Total electors: 45,226
- Reservation: None

Member of Legislative Assembly
- 13th Tripura Legislative Assembly
- Incumbent Kalyani Roy
- Party: Bharatiya Janata Party
- Elected year: 2023

Teliamura is one of the 60 Legislative Assembly constituencies of Tripura state in India. It is in Khowai district and is reserved for candidates belonging to the Scheduled Tribes. It is also part of East Tripura Lok Sabha constituency.

== Members of the Legislative Assembly ==
Election	Member	Party
1967	P. K. Das	Indian National Congress
1972	Anil Sarkar	Communist Party of India
1977	Jitendra Sarkar	Communist Party of India
1983	Gita Chowdhury	Indian National Congress
1988	Jitendra Sarkar	Communist Party of India
1993	Jitendra Sarkar	Communist Party of India
1998	Jitendra Sarkar	Communist Party of India
2003	Ashok Kumar Baidya	Indian National Congress
2008	Gouri Das	Communist Party of India
2013	Gouri Das	Communist Party of India
2018	Kalyani Saha Roy	Bharatiya Janata Party
2023	Kalyani Saha Roy	Bharatiya Janata Party

== Election results ==
=== 2023 Assembly election ===
2023 Tripura Legislative Assembly election: Teliamura
Party	Candidate	Votes	%	±%
BJP	Kalyani Saha Roy	16,755	42.10%	▼14.27
INC	Ashok Kumar Baidya	12,603	31.67%	▲30.55
TMP	Abhijit Sarkar	8,904	22.37%	New
Independent	Narayan Debnath	604	1.52%	New
AITC	Rabi Chowdhury	575	1.44%	New
NOTA	None of the Above	358	0.90%	▼0.02
Margin of victory		4,152	10.43%	▼7.90
Turnout		39,799	89.52%	▼3.28
Registered electors		45,226		▲5.40
BJP hold		Swing	▼14.27	

=== 2018 Assembly election ===
2018 Tripura Legislative Assembly election: Teliamura
Party	Candidate	Votes	%	±%
BJP	Kalyani Saha Roy	22,077	56.37%	▲55.38
CPI(M)	Gouri Das	14,898	38.04%	▼12.16
INC	Nityagopal Rudra Pal	438	1.12%	▼45.49
Tipraland State Party	Chinta Kumar Debbarma	432	1.10%	New
NOTA	None of the Above	359	0.92%	New
AMB	Gopal Chandra Sarkar	328	0.84%	▼0.22
Margin of victory		7,179	18.33%	▲14.74
Turnout		39,166	89.98%	▼2.01
Registered electors		42,907		▲9.46
BJP gain from CPI(M)		Swing	▲6.17	

=== 2013 Assembly election ===
2013 Tripura Legislative Assembly election: Teliamura
Party	Candidate	Votes	%	±%
CPI(M)	Gouri Das	18,357	50.20%	▲0.09
INC	Gourisankar Roy	17,044	46.61%	▲0.45
IPFT	Patal Kanya Jamatia	422	1.15%	New
AMB	Gopal Sarkar	386	1.06%	▼0.96
BJP	Biswajit Debroy	362	0.99%	▼0.74
Margin of victory		1,313	3.59%	▼0.36
Turnout		36,571	93.51%	▲0.88
Registered electors		39,199		
CPI(M) hold		Swing	▲0.09	

=== 2008 Assembly election ===
2008 Tripura Legislative Assembly election: Teliamura
Party	Candidate	Votes	%	±%
CPI(M)	Gouri Das	14,816	50.10%	▲5.49
INC	Ashok Kumar Baidya	13,647	46.15%	▼5.55
AMB	Gouranga Rudrapaul	595	2.01%	▼0.08
BJP	Laxmi Kanta Sarkar	512	1.73%	New
Margin of victory		1,169	3.95%	▼3.13
Turnout		29,570	92.68%	▲14.56
Registered electors		31,996		
CPI(M) gain from INC		Swing	▼1.60	

=== 2003 Assembly election ===
2003 Tripura Legislative Assembly election: Teliamura
Party	Candidate	Votes	%	±%
INC	Ashok Kumar Baidya	12,579	51.70%	▲5.09
CPI(M)	Jitendra Sarkar	10,856	44.62%	▼3.47
AMB	Gouranga Rudrapaul	508	2.09%	▲0.71
Independent	Sudhir Sarkar	210	0.86%	New
Independent	Kumud Ranjan Deb	177	0.73%	New
Margin of victory		1,723	7.08%	▲5.60
Turnout		24,330	78.00%	▲0.04
Registered electors		31,249		▲8.40
INC gain from CPI(M)		Swing	▲3.61	

=== 1998 Assembly election ===
1998 Tripura Legislative Assembly election: Teliamura
Party	Candidate	Votes	%	±%
CPI(M)	Jitendra Sarkar	10,789	48.09%	▼1.82
INC	Gopal Chandra Roy	10,457	46.61%	▲14.52
BJP	Paresh Chandra Biswas	879	3.92%	New
AMB	Gouranga Rudrapaul	309	1.38%	▼6.22
Margin of victory		332	1.48%	▼16.33
Turnout		22,434	79.09%	▼2.70
Registered electors		28,827		▲5.06
CPI(M) hold		Swing	▼1.82	

=== 1993 Assembly election ===
1993 Tripura Legislative Assembly election: Teliamura
Party	Candidate	Votes	%	±%
CPI(M)	Jitendra Sarkar	11,028	49.91%	▲1.14
INC	Ashok Kumar Baidya	7,092	32.10%	▼14.67
Independent	Bimal Singh	1,859	8.41%	New
AMB	Bhuban Bijoy Majumder	1,678	7.59%	New
Independent	Brihalal Jamatia	167	0.76%	New
Independent	Anand Sarkar	123	0.56%	New
Margin of victory		3,936	17.81%	▲15.81
Turnout		22,096	81.45%	▼3.19
Registered electors		27,439		▲17.91
CPI(M) hold		Swing	▲1.14	

=== 1988 Assembly election ===
1988 Tripura Legislative Assembly election: Teliamura
Party	Candidate	Votes	%	±%
CPI(M)	Jitendra Sarkar	9,502	48.77%	▲11.58
INC	Ashok Kumar Baidya	9,111	46.77%	▲4.29
Independent	Gouranga Rudra Pal	869	4.46%	New
Margin of victory		391	2.01%	▼3.28
Turnout		19,482	84.44%	▲1.91
Registered electors		23,271		▲18.32
CPI(M) gain from INC		Swing		

=== 1983 Assembly election ===
1983 Tripura Legislative Assembly election: Teliamura
Party	Candidate	Votes	%	±%
INC	Gita Chowdhury	6,835	42.48%	▲17.64
CPI(M)	Jitendra Sarkar	5,984	37.19%	▼5.12
Independent	Gouranga Rudrapaul	3,271	20.33%	New
Margin of victory		851	5.29%	▼12.18
Turnout		16,090	83.15%	▲3.99
Registered electors		19,668		▲12.25
INC gain from CPI(M)		Swing		

=== 1977 Assembly election ===
1977 Tripura Legislative Assembly election: Teliamura
Party	Candidate	Votes	%	±%
CPI(M)	Jitendra Sarkar	5,769	42.31%	▼8.88
INC	Ratan Chakraborty	3,387	24.84%	▼11.24
TUS	Akhay Kumar Jamatia	1,975	14.48%	New
JP	Rajkumar Acharjee	1,260	9.24%	New
TPCC	Naresh Chandra Roy	1,099	8.06%	New
Proutist Bloc, India	Sunil Kanti Nath	145	1.06%	New
Margin of victory		2,382	17.47%	▲2.36
Turnout		13,635	78.97%	▲6.66
Registered electors		17,521		▲16.93
CPI(M) hold		Swing	▼8.88	

=== 1972 Assembly election ===
1972 Tripura Legislative Assembly election: Teliamura
Party	Candidate	Votes	%	±%
CPI(M)	Anil Sarkar	5,458	51.19%	▲20.81
INC	Bir Chandra Barman	3,847	36.08%	▼28.52
Independent	Sukhamoy Das	1,146	10.75%	New
Independent	Sukhindra Chandra Das	212	1.99%	New
Margin of victory		1,611	15.11%	▼19.11
Turnout		10,663	73.05%	▲0.28
Registered electors		14,984		▼40.64
CPI(M) gain from INC		Swing	▼13.41	

=== 1967 Assembly election ===
1967 Tripura Legislative Assembly election: Teliamura
Party	Candidate	Votes	%	±%
INC	P. K. Das	11,558	64.60%	New
CPI(M)	A. C. Sarker	5,435	30.38%	New
Independent	K. C. Das	899	5.02%	New
Margin of victory		6,123	34.22%	
Turnout		17,892	73.53%	
Registered electors		25,242		
INC win (new seat)				

== See also ==
- List of constituencies of the Tripura Legislative Assembly
- Khowai district
- Teliamura
- Tripura East (Lok Sabha constituency)
