= Swapna Majumder =

Indian politician (born 1974)

Member of the Tripura Legislative Assembly
- Incumbent
- Assumed office 2 March 2023
- Preceded by: Sudhan Das
- Constituency: Rajnagar

Personal details
- Born: 12 August 1974 (age 52)
- Party: Bharatiya Janata Party
- Education: Tripura University
- Profession: Politician

Swapna Majumder (born 12 August 1974) is an Indian politician from Tripura. She is a member of the Tripura Legislative Assembly from the Rajnagar Assembly constituency, which is reserved for Scheduled Caste community, in South Tripura district, representing the Bharatiya Janata Party.

== Early life and education ==
Majumder is from Rajnagar, South Tripura district, Tripura. She married Asim Majumder. She completed her B.A. in 1997 at a college affiliated with Tripura University.

== Career ==
Majumder was elected from the Rajnagar, Tripura Assembly constituency representing the Bharatiya Janata Party in the 2023 Tripura Legislative Assembly election. She polled 20,849 votes and defeated her nearest rival, Sudhan Das of the Communist Party of India (Marxist), by a margin of 1,335 votes.
