= Badharghat =

- Census town
- Location within Tripura Location within India
- Coordinates: 23.79°N 91.28°E
- Country: India
- State: Tripura
- District: West Tripura

Population (2001)
  - Total: 47,660

Languages
  - Official: Bengali, Kokborok, English
- Time zone: UTC+5:30 (IST)
- PIN: 799003
- Vehicle registration: TR
- Website: tripura.gov.in

Badharghat is a census town in West Tripura district in the state of Tripura, India.

== Geography ==
Badharghat is located at 23.79°N 91.28°E.

== Demographics ==
As of 2001 India census, Badharghat had a population of 47,660. Males constitute 51% of the population and females 49%. Badharghat has an average literacy rate of 80%, higher than the national average of 59.5%; with 53% of the males and 47% of females literate. About 9% of the population is under 6 years of age.

== Politics ==
Badharghat assembly constituency is part of Tripura West (Lok Sabha constituency).
