= Baju Ban Riyan =

Indian politician (1941–2020)

The Honourable Leader Bajuban Reang

Member of the Indian Parliament for 7th, 8th, 11th, 12th, 13th, 14th and 15th Lok Sabha
- In office 1980–1989, 1996–2014
- Preceded by: Dasarath Debbarma
- Succeeded by: Jitendra Choudhury
- Constituency: Tripura East

Minister for Agriculture, Animal Husbandry, Cooperation and Fishery Government of Tripura
- In office 1977–1980

Member, Tripura Legislative Assembly
- In office 1967–1980

President of Tripura Rajya Upajati Ganamukti Parishad (TRUGP)
- In office 1970-1980

Personal details
- Born: 13 March 1941 East Bagafa village, South Tripura district, Tripura, India
- Died: 21 February 2020 (aged 78)
- Party: CPI(M)
- Spouse: Jharna Reang
- Children: 2 sons and 1 daughter
- As of 28 March, 2010 Source: []

Baju Ban Reang (13 March 1941 – 21 February 2020), was an Indian politician from Tripura state. He was a member of the central committee and the secretariat of the Tripura state unit of the Communist Party of India (Marxist) (CPI(M)). He was also president of the Tripura Rajya Upajati Ganamukti Parishad.

== Political career ==
Bajuban Reang was a member of the Tripura Legislative Assembly from 1967 to 1980. From 1978 to 1979, he was the Minister for Agriculture, Animal Husbandry, Cooperation and Fishery in the Tripura state government. In 1980, he was elected to the 7th Lok Sabha from Tripura East constituency in Tripura state. He was re-elected to the Lok Sabha in 1984, 1996, 1998, 1999, 2004 and 2009 from the same constituency.
