= Badharghat Assembly constituency =

Legislative Assembly constituency in Tripura State, India

Coordinates: 23.8°N 91.27°E

Badharghat
- Constituency No. 14 for the Tripura Legislative Assembly

Constituency details
- Country: India
- Region: Northeast India
- State: Tripura
- District: West Tripura
- Lok Sabha constituency: Tripura West
- Established: 1977
- Total electors: 62,207
- Reservation: SC

Member of Legislative Assembly
- 13th Tripura Legislative Assembly
- Incumbent Mina Rani Sarkar
- Party: Bharatiya Janata Party
- Elected year: 2023

Badharghat is one of the 60 Legislative Assembly constituencies of Tripura state in India. It is part of West Tripura district and is reserved for candidates belonging to the Scheduled Castes. It is also part of West Tripura Lok Sabha constituency.

== Members of the Legislative Assembly ==
Election	Member	Party
1977	Jadab Majumder	Communist Party of India
1983	Jadab Majumder	Communist Party of India
1988	Dilip Sarkar	Indian National Congress
1993	Jadab Majumder	Communist Party of India
1998	Dilip Sarkar	Indian National Congress
2003	Subrata Chakraborty	Communist Party of India
2008	Dilip Sarkar	Indian National Congress
2013	Dilip Sarkar	Indian National Congress
2018	Dilip Sarkar	Bharatiya Janata Party
2019 by-election	Mimi Majumder	Bharatiya Janata Party
2023	Mina Rani Sarkar	Bharatiya Janata Party

== Election results ==
=== 2023 Assembly election ===
2023 Tripura Legislative Assembly election: Badharghat
Party	Candidate	Votes	%	±%
BJP	Mina Rani Sarkar	27,427	48.94%	▲3.69
AIFB	Partha Ranjan Sarkar	26,138	46.64%	New
Independent	Sushil Chandra Das	1,036	1.85%	New
Independent	Mridul Kanti Sarkar	723	1.29%	New
NOTA	None of the Above	720	1.28%	▼0.19
Margin of victory		1,289	2.30%	▼9.35
Turnout		56,044	90.24%	▲12.24
Registered electors		62,207		▲6.98
BJP hold		Swing	▲3.69	

=== 2019 Assembly election ===
2019 Tripura Legislative Assembly by-election: Badharghat
Party	Candidate	Votes	%	±%
BJP	Mimi Majumder	20,487	45.25%	▼7.61
CPI(M)	Bulti Biswas	15,211	33.60%	▼9.18
INC	Ratan Chandra Das	9,105	20.11%	▲19.18
NOTA	None of the Above	667	1.47%	New
SUCI(C)	Mridul Kanti Sarkar	470	1.04%	New
Margin of victory		5,276	11.65%	▲1.57
Turnout		45,273	78.96%	▼15.85
Registered electors		58,150		▲0.85
BJP hold		Swing	▼7.61	

=== 2018 Assembly election ===
2018 Tripura Legislative Assembly election: Badharghat
Party	Candidate	Votes	%	±%
BJP	Dilip Sarkar	28,561	52.86%	▲51.79
CPI(M)	Jharna Das(Baidya)	23,113	42.78%	New
INC	Ratan Chandra Das	505	0.93%	▼48.35
NOTA	None of the Above	474	0.88%	New
Margin of victory		5,448	10.08%	▲8.78
Turnout		54,033	92.10%	▲0.07
Registered electors		57,661		
BJP gain from INC		Swing	▲3.57	

=== 2013 Assembly election ===
2013 Tripura Legislative Assembly election: Badharghat
Party	Candidate	Votes	%	±%
INC	Dilip Sarkar	24,309	49.29%	▲0.85
RSP	Samar Das	23,666	47.98%	New
BJP	Bidyut Das	529	1.07%	▼0.12
AMB	Subal Sarkar	510	1.03%	New
SUCI(C)	Asit Das	308	0.62%	New
Margin of victory		643	1.30%	▲0.69
Turnout		49,322	93.70%	▲0.86
Registered electors		52,672		
INC hold		Swing	▲0.85	

=== 2008 Assembly election ===
2008 Tripura Legislative Assembly election: Badharghat
Party	Candidate	Votes	%	±%
INC	Dilip Sarkar	29,724	48.43%	▲1.27
CPI(M)	Subrata Chakraborty	29,349	47.82%	▼1.39
BJP	Rama Prasad Paul	731	1.19%	▼0.51
Independent	Subrata Chakraborty	689	1.12%	New
AIFB	Dilip Dutta	380	0.62%	New
NCP	Dwijendra Sahaji	310	0.51%	New
Margin of victory		375	0.61%	▼1.44
Turnout		61,371	92.96%	▲12.77
Registered electors		66,149		▲14.37
INC gain from CPI(M)		Swing	▼0.78	

=== 2003 Assembly election ===
2003 Tripura Legislative Assembly election: Badharghat
Party	Candidate	Votes	%	±%
CPI(M)	Subrata Chakraborty	22,773	49.21%	▲3.90
INC	Dilip Sarkar	21,825	47.16%	▼2.09
BJP	Hrishikesh Dey	789	1.71%	▼3.14
Independent	Subrata Chakraborty	390	0.84%	New
Independent	Shyam Kumar Das	374	0.81%	New
Margin of victory		948	2.05%	▼1.89
Turnout		46,275	80.01%	▼0.10
Registered electors		57,836		▲17.80
CPI(M) gain from INC		Swing	▼0.04	

=== 1998 Assembly election ===
1998 Tripura Legislative Assembly election: Badharghat
Party	Candidate	Votes	%	±%
INC	Dilip Sarkar	19,372	49.25%	▲4.21
CPI(M)	Jadab Majumder	17,823	45.32%	▼6.23
BJP	Shipra De	1,905	4.84%	▲3.19
Margin of victory		1,549	3.94%	▼2.56
Turnout		39,331	81.46%	▲0.72
Registered electors		49,098		▲2.70
INC gain from CPI(M)		Swing		

=== 1993 Assembly election ===
1993 Tripura Legislative Assembly election: Badharghat
Party	Candidate	Votes	%	±%
CPI(M)	Jadab Majumder	19,563	51.55%	▲2.57
INC	Dilip Sarkar	17,096	45.05%	▼5.10
BJP	Sipra De	628	1.65%	New
Margin of victory		2,467	6.50%	▲5.33
Turnout		37,952	80.62%	▼3.41
Registered electors		47,808		▲42.57
CPI(M) gain from INC		Swing		

=== 1988 Assembly election ===
1988 Tripura Legislative Assembly election: Badharghat
Party	Candidate	Votes	%	±%
INC	Dilip Sarkar	13,923	50.15%	▲7.28
CPI(M)	Ila Bhattacherje	13,597	48.98%	▼7.39
Independent	Nikhil Roy	141	0.51%	New
Margin of victory		326	1.17%	▼12.33
Turnout		27,763	84.04%	▲1.53
Registered electors		33,534		▲36.61
INC gain from CPI(M)		Swing		

=== 1983 Assembly election ===
1983 Tripura Legislative Assembly election: Badharghat
Party	Candidate	Votes	%	±%
CPI(M)	Jadab Majumder	11,244	56.37%	▼18.46
INC	Niranjan Paul	8,551	42.87%	▲34.11
Margin of victory		2,693	13.50%	▼48.57
Turnout		19,948	82.65%	▲2.67
Registered electors		24,547		▲33.47
CPI(M) hold		Swing	▼18.46	

=== 1977 Assembly election ===
1977 Tripura Legislative Assembly election: Badharghat
Party	Candidate	Votes	%	±%
CPI(M)	Jadab Majumder	10,816	74.83%	New
TPCC	Sachindra Lal Singha	1,844	12.76%	New
INC	Manik Chandra Chakraborty	1,266	8.76%	New
JP	Harendra Kishore Roy Barman	528	3.65%	New
Margin of victory		8,972	62.07%	
Turnout		14,454	80.06%	
Registered electors		18,391		
CPI(M) win (new seat)				

== See also ==
- List of constituencies of the Tripura Legislative Assembly
- West Tripura district
- Badharghat
- Tripura West (Lok Sabha constituency)
