= Karamcherra Assembly constituency =

Legislative Assembly constituency in Tripura State, India

Coordinates: 24.04°N 92.02°E

Karamcherra
- Constituency No. 48 for the Tripura Legislative Assembly

Constituency details
- Country: India
- Region: Northeast India
- State: Tripura
- District: Dhalai
- Lok Sabha constituency: Tripura East
- Established: 2008
- Total electors: 43,842
- Reservation: ST

Member of Legislative Assembly
- 13th Tripura Legislative Assembly
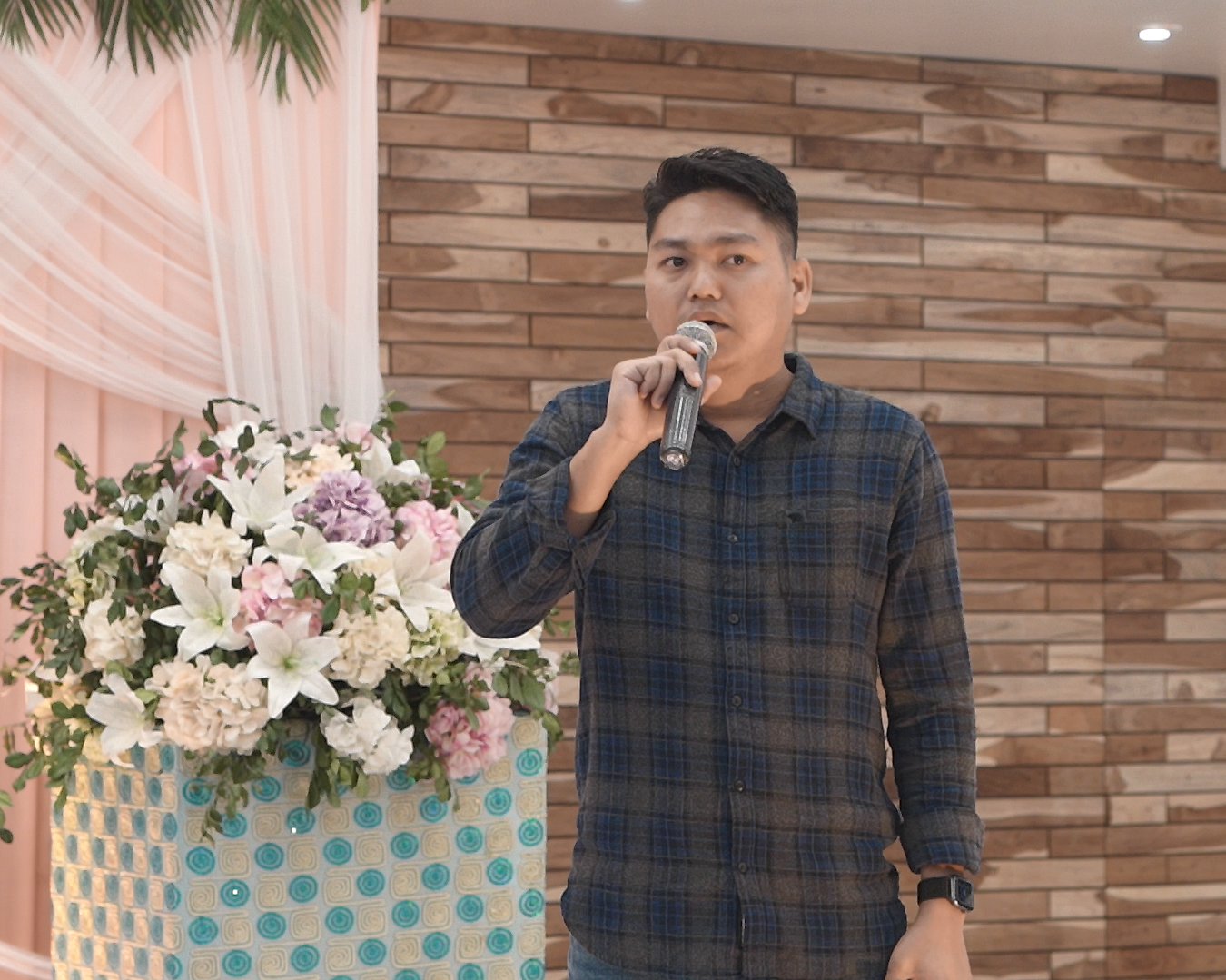
- Incumbent Paul Dangshu
- Party: TMP
- Alliance: NDA
- Elected year: 2023

Karamcherra is one of the 60 Legislative Assembly constituencies of Tripura state in India.

It is part of Dhalai district and is reserved for candidates belonging to the Scheduled Tribes.

== Members of the Legislative Assembly ==
Election	Member	Party
2013	Diba Chandra Hrangkhawl	Indian National Congress
2018	Diba Chandra Hrangkhawl	Bharatiya Janata Party
2023	Paul Dangshu	Tipra Motha Party

== Election results ==
=== 2023 Assembly election ===
2023 Tripura Legislative Assembly election: Karamcherra
Party	Candidate	Votes	%	±%
TMP	Paul Dangshu	20,496	52.73%	New
BJP	Braja Lal Tripura	9,901	25.47%	▼30.12
INC	Diba Chandra Hrangkhawl	7,344	18.89%	▲16.78
Tripura Peoples Party	Bishwanath Debbarma	397	1.02%	▲0.43
NOTA	None of the Above	367	0.94%	▼0.37
Independent	Indrakhela Chakma	366	0.94%	New
Margin of victory		10,595	27.26%	▲6.23
Turnout		38,871	89.65%	▼0.47
Registered electors		43,842		▲12.00
TMP gain from BJP		Swing	▼2.86	

=== 2018 Assembly election ===
2018 Tripura Legislative Assembly election: Karamcherra
Party	Candidate	Votes	%	±%
BJP	Diba Chandra Hrangkhawl	19,397	55.59%	▲54.15
CPI(M)	Umakanta Tripura	12,061	34.57%	▼10.77
INPT	Ratish Tripura	1,864	5.34%	New
INC	Ranjanbati Debbarma	739	2.12%	▼47.65
NOTA	None of the Above	459	1.32%	New
Independent	Kalpa Mohan Tripura	258	0.74%	New
Tripura Peoples Party	Chiranjoy Reang	208	0.60%	New
Margin of victory		7,336	21.03%	▲16.59
Turnout		34,891	90.03%	▼1.74
Registered electors		39,145		▲14.88
BJP gain from INC		Swing	▲5.82	

=== 2013 Assembly election ===
2013 Tripura Legislative Assembly election: Karamcherra
Party	Candidate	Votes	%	±%
INC	Diba Chandra Hrangkhawl	15,411	49.77%	New
CPI(M)	Gajendra Tripura	14,039	45.34%	New
Independent	Chiranjoy Reang	488	1.58%	New
BJP	Padma Bikash Tripura	446	1.44%	New
Independent	Kalpa Mohan Tripura	226	0.73%	New
IPFT	Saimon Darlong	208	0.67%	New
Margin of victory		1,372	4.43%	
Turnout		30,963	91.10%	
Registered electors		34,074		
INC win (new seat)				

== See also ==
- List of constituencies of the Tripura Legislative Assembly
- Dhalai district
