= Rajnagar, Tripura Assembly constituency =

Legislative Assembly constituency in Tripura, India

Coordinates: 24.19°N 72.42°E

Rajnagar
- Constituency No. 34 for the Tripura Legislative Assembly

Constituency details
- Country: India
- Region: Northeast India
- State: Tripura
- District: South Tripura
- Lok Sabha constituency: Tripura West
- Established: 1972
- Total electors: 48,011
- Reservation: SC

Member of Legislative Assembly
- 13th Tripura Legislative Assembly
- Incumbent Swapna Majumder
- Party: Bharatiya Janata Party
- Elected year: 2023

Rajnagar Legislative Assembly constituency is one of the 60 Legislative Assembly constituencies of Tripura state in India.

It comprises Rajnagar tehsil, Radhanagar tehsil and Siddhinagar tehsil along with parts of Barpathari tehsil in South Tripura district and is reserved for candidates belonging to the Scheduled Castes.

== Members of the Legislative Assembly ==
Election	Member	Party
1972	Lakshmi Nag	Indian National Congress
1977	Nakul Das	Communist Party of India
1983	Nakul Das	Communist Party of India
1988	Nakul Das	Communist Party of India
1993	Sudhan Das	Communist Party of India
1998	Sudhan Das	Communist Party of India
2003	Sudhan Das	Communist Party of India
2008	Sudhan Das	Communist Party of India
2013	Sudhan Das	Communist Party of India
2018	Sudhan Das	Communist Party of India
2023	Swapna Majumder	Bharatiya Janata Party

== Election results ==
=== 2023 Assembly election ===
2023 Tripura Legislative Assembly election: Rajnagar
Party	Candidate	Votes	%	±%
BJP	Swapna Majumder	20,849	48.07%	▲7.15
CPI(M)	Sudhan Das	19,514	45.00%	▼10.28
TMP	Abhijit Malakar	2,267	5.23%	New
NOTA	None of the Above	738	1.70%	▲0.62
Margin of victory		1,335	3.08%	▼11.27
Turnout		43,368	90.40%	▼0.72
Registered electors		48,011		▲9.82
BJP gain from CPI(M)		Swing	▼7.21	

=== 2018 Assembly election ===
2018 Tripura Legislative Assembly election: Rajnagar
Party	Candidate	Votes	%	±%
CPI(M)	Sudhan Das	22,004	55.28%	▼8.33
BJP	Bibhishan Chandra Das	16,291	40.93%	▲39.66
INC	Manik Das	459	1.15%	▼32.18
NOTA	None of the Above	431	1.08%	New
CPI(ML)L	Uttam Dhupi	368	0.92%	▼0.87
Margin of victory		5,713	14.35%	▼15.93
Turnout		39,804	91.00%	▼3.93
Registered electors		43,718		▲10.31
CPI(M) hold		Swing	▼8.33	

=== 2013 Assembly election ===
2013 Tripura Legislative Assembly election: Rajnagar
Party	Candidate	Votes	%	±%
CPI(M)	Sudhan Das	23,942	63.61%	▲7.02
INC	Manik Chandra Das	12,545	33.33%	▼4.66
CPI(ML)L	Jagadish Das	675	1.79%	▲0.77
BJP	Sakhil Das	478	1.27%	▼0.21
Margin of victory		11,397	30.28%	▲11.68
Turnout		37,640	95.10%	▲0.90
Registered electors		39,631		
CPI(M) hold		Swing	▲7.02	

=== 2008 Assembly election ===
2008 Tripura Legislative Assembly election: Rajnagar
Party	Candidate	Votes	%	±%
CPI(M)	Sudhan Das	22,111	56.58%	▼5.34
INC	Bikash Chandra Das	14,843	37.98%	▲3.85
AITC	Sunil Chandra Das	624	1.60%	▲0.06
BJP	Radha Rani Das (Bhowmik)	580	1.48%	New
AMB	Kiriti Das	521	1.33%	New
CPI(ML)L	Tarani Kumar Das	398	1.02%	New
Margin of victory		7,268	18.60%	▼9.19
Turnout		39,077	94.17%	▲7.14
Registered electors		41,539		
CPI(M) hold		Swing	▼5.34	

=== 2003 Assembly election ===
2003 Tripura Legislative Assembly election: Rajnagar
Party	Candidate	Votes	%	±%
CPI(M)	Sudhan Das	19,462	61.93%	▲1.83
INC	Bikash Chandra Das	10,727	34.13%	▼2.69
LJP	Bibhisan Das	755	2.40%	New
AITC	Parimal Das	484	1.54%	New
Margin of victory		8,735	27.79%	▲4.52
Turnout		31,428	87.02%	▲0.62
Registered electors		36,153		▲11.42
CPI(M) hold		Swing	▲1.83	

=== 1998 Assembly election ===
1998 Tripura Legislative Assembly election: Rajnagar
Party	Candidate	Votes	%	±%
CPI(M)	Sudhan Das	16,831	60.10%	▲5.53
INC	Laxman Malakar	10,313	36.83%	▼7.18
BJP	Bibhishan Chandra Das	738	2.64%	New
Margin of victory		6,518	23.27%	▲12.71
Turnout		28,005	87.79%	▲1.35
Registered electors		32,448		▲0.52
CPI(M) hold		Swing		

=== 1993 Assembly election ===
1993 Tripura Legislative Assembly election: Rajnagar
Party	Candidate	Votes	%	±%
CPI(M)	Sudhan Das	14,964	54.57%	▼0.42
INC	Sefali Das	12,067	44.00%	▼0.60
Independent	Krishna Kumar Das	166	0.61%	New
AMB	Kiriti Das	145	0.53%	New
Margin of victory		2,897	10.56%	▲0.18
Turnout		27,424	86.10%	▼4.65
Registered electors		32,280		▲24.13
CPI(M) hold		Swing	▼0.42	

=== 1988 Assembly election ===
1988 Tripura Legislative Assembly election: Rajnagar
Party	Candidate	Votes	%	±%
CPI(M)	Nakul Das	12,813	54.99%	▲0.15
INC	Jogendra Das	10,393	44.60%	▲1.62
Margin of victory		2,420	10.39%	▼1.47
Turnout		23,302	90.58%	▲3.46
Registered electors		26,006		▲21.09
CPI(M) hold		Swing		

=== 1983 Assembly election ===
1983 Tripura Legislative Assembly election: Rajnagar
Party	Candidate	Votes	%	±%
CPI(M)	Nakul Das	10,144	54.83%	▼0.66
INC	Bhuban Mohan Das	7,951	42.98%	▲6.83
Independent	Paresh Sarkar	405	2.19%	New
Margin of victory		2,193	11.85%	▼7.48
Turnout		18,500	87.29%	▲9.21
Registered electors		21,476		▲17.12
CPI(M) hold		Swing		

=== 1977 Assembly election ===
1977 Tripura Legislative Assembly election: Rajnagar
Party	Candidate	Votes	%	±%
CPI(M)	Nakul Das	7,828	55.49%	▲24.64
INC	Upendra Kumar Das	5,100	36.15%	▲1.52
JP	Makhan Chandra Das	1,011	7.17%	New
TPCC	Jagdish Biswas	168	1.19%	New
Margin of victory		2,728	19.34%	▲15.55
Turnout		14,107	78.80%	▲15.24
Registered electors		18,336		▲20.00
CPI(M) gain from INC		Swing	▲20.86	

=== 1972 Assembly election ===
1972 Tripura Legislative Assembly election: Rajnagar
Party	Candidate	Votes	%	±%
INC	Lakshmi Nag	3,265	34.63%	New
CPI(M)	Badal Chowdhury	2,908	30.85%	New
Independent	Shiba Prasad Baidya	1,200	12.73%	New
CPI	Tarani Banik	1,151	12.21%	New
Independent	Upendra Kumar Das	554	5.88%	New
Independent	S. Kishore Dutta Chowdhury	255	2.70%	New
Independent	Manoranjan Majumdar	94	1.00%	New
Margin of victory		357	3.79%	
Turnout		9,427	63.83%	
Registered electors		15,280		
INC win (new seat)				

== See also ==
- List of constituencies of the Tripura Legislative Assembly
- South Tripura district
