= Diba Chandra Hrangkhawl =

Indian politician

Member of Tripura Legislative Assembly
- In office 2013–2023
- Constituency: Karamcherra

President of Tripura Pradesh Congress Committee
- In office June 2013 – January 2015
- Preceded by: Sudip Roy Barman
- Succeeded by: Birajit Sinha

Personal details
- Born: 11 February 1956 (age 70) Kumarghat
- Party: Bharatiya Janata Party (2017-2022) All India Trinamool Congress (2016-2017) Indian National Congress (1994-2016) (2022-Present)
- Spouse: Lalzaidami Darlong

Diba Chandra Hrangkhawl is a politician from Tripura, India. In the 2013 assembly elections, he represented the Karamcherra constituency in Unakoti district in the Tripura Legislative Assembly.

In 2016, he was one of the six MLAs from the Indian National Congress who joined the All India Trinamool Congress, due to dissatisfaction over the INC allying with the Communist Party of India (Marxist) in the 2016 West Bengal Legislative Assembly election.

In August 2017, he was one of the six AITC MLAs who joined the Bharatiya Janata Party after they voted against the party line in the 2017 Indian presidential election.
