= Surma Assembly constituency =

Legislative Assembly constituency in Tripura State, India

Coordinates: 24.12°N 91.85°E

Surma
- Constituency No. 46 for the Tripura Legislative Assembly

Constituency details
- Country: India
- Region: Northeast India
- State: Tripura
- District: Dhalai
- Lok Sabha constituency: Tripura East
- Established: 1972
- Total electors: 48,393
- Reservation: SC

Member of Legislative Assembly
- 13th Tripura Legislative Assembly
- Incumbent Swapna Das
- Party: Bharatiya Janata Party
- Elected year: 2022

Surma is one of the 60 Legislative Assembly constituencies of Tripura state in India.

It is part of Dhalai district and is reserved for candidates belonging to the Scheduled Castes.

== Members of the Legislative Assembly ==
| Election | Member | Party |
|---|---|---|
| 1972 | Kshitish Chandra Das | Indian National Congress |
| 1977 | Rudrewar Das | Communist Party of India |
| 1983 | Rudreswar Das | Communist Party of India |
| 1988 | Rudreswar Das | Communist Party of India |
| 1993 | Sudhir Das | Communist Party of India |
| 1998 | Sudhir Das | Communist Party of India |
| 2003 | Sudhir Das | Communist Party of India |
| 2008 | Sudhir Das | Communist Party of India |
| 2013 | Sudhir Das | Communist Party of India |
| 2015 by-election | Anjan Das | Communist Party of India |
| 2018 | Ashis Das | Bharatiya Janata Party |
| 2022 by-election | Swapna Das Paul | Bharatiya Janata Party |
| 2023 | Swapna Das Paul | Bharatiya Janata Party |

== Election results ==
=== 2023 Assembly election ===
2023 Tripura Legislative Assembly election: Surma
| Party | Candidate | Votes | % | ±% |
|---|---|---|---|---|
| BJP | Swapna Das Paul | 17,313 | 40.30% | ▼2.47 |
| CPI(M) | Anjan Das | 12,475 | 29.04% | ▲7.46 |
| TMP | Shyamal Sarkar | 11,467 | 26.69% | New |
| AITC | Arjun Namasudra | 610 | 1.42% | ▼2.02 |
| Independent | Pranesh Das | 416 | 0.97% | New |
| NOTA | None of the Above | 373 | 0.87% | ▼0.14 |
| Independent | Niranjan Das | 310 | 0.72% | New |
| Margin of victory | | 4,838 | 11.26% | ▼0.49 |
| Turnout | | 42,964 | 89.01% | ▲6.86 |
| Registered electors | | 48,393 | | ▲1.66 |
| BJP hold | | Swing | ▼2.47 | |

=== 2022 Assembly by-election ===
2022 Tripura Legislative Assembly by-election: Surma
| Party | Candidate | Votes | % | ±% |
|---|---|---|---|---|
| BJP | Swapna Das Paul | 16,677 | 42.77% | ▼8.71 |
| Independent | Baburam Satnami | 12,094 | 31.01% | New |
| CPI(M) | Anjan Das | 8,415 | 21.58% | ▼23.18 |
| AITC | Arjun Namasudra | 1,341 | 3.44% | ▲2.70 |
| Independent | Pranesh Das | 469 | 1.20% | New |
| NOTA | None of the Above | 393 | 1.01% | New |
| Margin of victory | | 4,583 | 11.75% | ▲5.03 |
| Turnout | | 38,996 | 81.64% | ▼8.37 |
| Registered electors | | 47,601 | | ▲6.54 |
| BJP hold | | Swing | ▼8.71 | |

=== 2018 Assembly election ===
2018 Tripura Legislative Assembly election: Surma
| Party | Candidate | Votes | % | ±% |
|---|---|---|---|---|
| BJP | Ashis Das | 20,767 | 51.48% | ▲28.12 |
| NOTA | None of the Above | 348 | 0.86% | New |
| INC | Tapas Kumar Das | 317 | 0.79% | ▼6.63 |
| AITC | Jay Kumar Keot | 300 | 0.74% | New |
| Margin of victory | | 2,710 | 6.72% | ▼38.18 |
| Turnout | | 40,341 | 90.43% | ▲9.45 |
| Registered electors | | 44,678 | | |
| BJP gain from CPI(M) | | Swing | ▼16.77 | |

=== 2015 Assembly by-election ===
2015 Tripura Legislative Assembly by-election: Surma
| Party | Candidate | Votes | % | ±% |
|---|---|---|---|---|
| CPI(M) | Anjan Das | 23,275 | 68.25% | ▲17.74 |
| BJP | Ashis Das | 7,966 | 23.36% | ▲22.24 |
| INC | Nagendra Chandra Biswas | 2,528 | 7.41% | ▼38.05 |
| NOTA | None of the Above | 428 | 1.26% | New |
| Independent | Sushil Malakar | 332 | 0.97% | New |
| Margin of victory | | 15,309 | 44.89% | ▲39.85 |
| Turnout | | 34,101 | 81.86% | ▼9.49 |
| Registered electors | | 42,183 | | |
| CPI(M) hold | | Swing | ▲17.74 | |

=== 2013 Assembly election ===
2013 Tripura Legislative Assembly election: Surma
| Party | Candidate | Votes | % | ±% |
|---|---|---|---|---|
| CPI(M) | Sudhir Das | 18,648 | 50.51% | ▼1.37 |
| INC | Sukha Ranjan Das | 16,786 | 45.47% | ▲3.16 |
| BJP | Anadi Sarkar | 415 | 1.12% | ▼1.14 |
| Independent | Sushil Chandra Malakar | 394 | 1.07% | New |
| AMB | Bidhu Chandar Das | 236 | 0.64% | ▼0.21 |
| Independent | Lukesh Sabdakar | 231 | 0.63% | New |
| Margin of victory | | 1,862 | 5.04% | ▼4.52 |
| Turnout | | 36,919 | 92.66% | ▼1.05 |
| Registered electors | | 40,873 | | ▲34.94 |
| CPI(M) hold | | Swing | ▼1.37 | |

=== 2008 Assembly election ===
2008 Tripura Legislative Assembly election: Surma
| Party | Candidate | Votes | % | ±% |
|---|---|---|---|---|
| CPI(M) | Sudhir Das | 14,359 | 51.88% | ▼3.87 |
| INC | Sukha Ranjan Das | 11,711 | 42.31% | ▲0.60 |
| BJP | Nishi Kanta Sarkar | 626 | 2.26% | ▼0.29 |
| Independent | Hiralal Das | 312 | 1.13% | New |
| Independent | Pradip Malakar | 237 | 0.86% | New |
| AMB | Biswanath Rabidas | 235 | 0.85% | New |
| AIFB | Sunil Chandra Das | 199 | 0.72% | New |
| Margin of victory | | 2,648 | 9.57% | ▼4.47 |
| Turnout | | 27,679 | 91.50% | ▲11.30 |
| Registered electors | | 30,290 | | ▲5.10 |
| CPI(M) hold | | Swing | ▼3.87 | |

=== 2003 Assembly election ===
2003 Tripura Legislative Assembly election: Surma
| Party | Candidate | Votes | % | ±% |
|---|---|---|---|---|
| CPI(M) | Sudhir Das | 12,865 | 55.74% | ▲4.52 |
| INC | Harendra Chandra Das | 9,626 | 41.71% | ▼1.21 |
| BJP | Satyabrata Das | 588 | 2.55% | ▼2.45 |
| Margin of victory | | 3,239 | 14.03% | ▲5.73 |
| Turnout | | 23,079 | 80.21% | ▼0.06 |
| Registered electors | | 28,819 | | ▲14.39 |
| CPI(M) hold | | Swing | | |

=== 1998 Assembly election ===
1998 Tripura Legislative Assembly election: Surma
| Party | Candidate | Votes | % | ±% |
|---|---|---|---|---|
| CPI(M) | Sudhir Das | 10,344 | 51.23% | ▼5.41 |
| INC | Surjalal Das | 8,667 | 42.92% | ▲3.93 |
| BJP | Anadi Sarkar | 1,010 | 5.00% | ▲3.66 |
| AMB | Chittaranjan Das | 137 | 0.68% | ▼1.96 |
| Margin of victory | | 1,677 | 8.31% | ▼9.34 |
| Turnout | | 20,192 | 81.56% | ▼3.10 |
| Registered electors | | 25,194 | | ▲3.50 |
| CPI(M) hold | | Swing | ▼5.41 | |

=== 1993 Assembly election ===
1993 Tripura Legislative Assembly election: Surma
| Party | Candidate | Votes | % | ±% |
|---|---|---|---|---|
| CPI(M) | Sudhir Das | 11,477 | 56.64% | ▲5.70 |
| INC | Sushendra Malakar | 7,901 | 38.99% | ▼7.45 |
| AMB | Sushil Chandra Malakar | 535 | 2.64% | New |
| BJP | Khitish Nanasudra | 271 | 1.34% | New |
| Margin of victory | | 3,576 | 17.65% | ▲13.15 |
| Turnout | | 20,264 | 84.25% | ▼4.12 |
| Registered electors | | 24,342 | | ▲21.15 |
| CPI(M) hold | | Swing | ▲5.70 | |

=== 1988 Assembly election ===
1988 Tripura Legislative Assembly election: Surma
| Party | Candidate | Votes | % | ±% |
|---|---|---|---|---|
| CPI(M) | Rudreswar Das | 8,941 | 50.93% | ▼0.52 |
| INC | Harendra Chandra Das | 8,152 | 46.44% | ▲5.25 |
| Independent | Sushil Chandra Malakar | 415 | 2.36% | New |
| Margin of victory | | 789 | 4.49% | ▼5.77 |
| Turnout | | 17,554 | 88.35% | ▲1.65 |
| Registered electors | | 20,092 | | ▲14.16 |
| CPI(M) hold | | Swing | ▼0.52 | |

=== 1983 Assembly election ===
1983 Tripura Legislative Assembly election: Surma
| Party | Candidate | Votes | % | ±% |
|---|---|---|---|---|
| CPI(M) | Rudreswar Das | 7,763 | 51.45% | ▼6.37 |
| INC | Harendra Chandra Das | 6,215 | 41.19% | ▲24.82 |
| Independent | Sushil Chandra Malakar | 1,109 | 7.35% | New |
| Margin of victory | | 1,548 | 10.26% | ▼31.19 |
| Turnout | | 15,087 | 86.82% | ▲3.56 |
| Registered electors | | 17,600 | | ▲12.96 |
| CPI(M) hold | | Swing | ▼6.37 | |

=== 1977 Assembly election ===
1977 Tripura Legislative Assembly election: Surma
| Party | Candidate | Votes | % | ±% |
|---|---|---|---|---|
| CPI(M) | Rudrewar Das | 7,403 | 57.83% | ▲14.6 |
| INC | Jogendra Das | 2,096 | 16.37% | ▼32.36 |
| TPCC | Nepal Chandra Das | 1,950 | 15.23% | New |
| JP | Biswa Ranjan Das | 985 | 7.69% | New |
| Proutist Bloc, India | Barindra Das | 368 | 2.87% | New |
| Margin of victory | | 5,307 | 41.45% | ▲35.95 |
| Turnout | | 12,802 | 83.58% | ▲7.34 |
| Registered electors | | 15,581 | | ▲19.94 |
| CPI(M) gain from INC | | Swing | ▲9.10 | |

=== 1972 Assembly election ===
1972 Tripura Legislative Assembly election: Surma
| Party | Candidate | Votes | % | ±% |
|---|---|---|---|---|
| INC | Kshitish Chandra Das | 4,737 | 48.73% | New |
| CPI(M) | Rudreswar Das | 4,202 | 43.23% | New |
| Independent | Atindra Das | 782 | 8.04% | New |
| Margin of victory | | 535 | 5.50% | |
| Turnout | | 9,721 | 77.20% | |
| Registered electors | | 12,991 | | |
| INC win (new seat) | | | | |

== See also ==
- List of constituencies of the Tripura Legislative Assembly
- Dhalai district
