= Panisagar Assembly constituency =

Legislative Assembly constituency in Tripura, India

Coordinates: 24.26°N 92.15°E

Panisagar
- Constituency No. 58 for the Tripura Legislative Assembly

Constituency details
- Country: India
- Region: Northeast India
- State: Tripura
- District: North Tripura
- Lok Sabha constituency: Tripura East
- Established: 1977
- Total electors: 44,601
- Reservation: None

Member of Legislative Assembly
- 13th Tripura Legislative Assembly
- Incumbent Binay Bhushan Das
- Party: Bharatiya Janata Party
- Elected year: 2023

Panisagar is one of the 60 Legislative Assembly constituencies of Tripura state in India.

It comprises parts of Jalebasa tehsil, Panisagar tehsil, Ramnagar tehsil, Dharmanagar tehsil, Damchhara tehsil and Pencharthal tehsil, all in North Tripura district.

== Members of the Legislative Assembly ==
Election	Member	Party
1977	Subodh Chandra Das	Communist Party of India
1983	Subodh Chandra Das	Communist Party of India
1988	Subodh Chandra Das	Communist Party of India
1993	Subodh Chandra Das	Communist Party of India
1998	Subodh Chandra Das	Communist Party of India
2003	Subodh Chandra Das	Communist Party of India
2008	Subodh Chandra Das	Communist Party of India
2013	Subodh Chandra Das	Communist Party of India
2018	Binay Bhushan Das	Bharatiya Janata Party
2023	Binay Bhushan Das	Bharatiya Janata Party

== Election results ==
=== 2023 Assembly election ===
2023 Tripura Legislative Assembly election: Panisagar
Party	Candidate	Votes	%	±%
BJP	Binay Bhushan Das	15,745	41.61%	▼6.94
CPI(M)	Sital Das	13,247	35.01%	▼11.82
TMP	Joy Chuangthang Halam	7,612	20.11%	New
Independent	Arun Nath	648	1.71%	New
NOTA	None of the Above	591	1.56%	▲0.74
Margin of victory		2,498	6.60%	▲4.89
Turnout		37,843	85.03%	▼5.29
Registered electors		44,601		▲22.80
BJP hold		Swing	▼6.94	

=== 2018 Assembly election ===
2018 Tripura Legislative Assembly election: Panisagar
Party	Candidate	Votes	%	±%
BJP	Binay Bhushan Das	15,892	48.54%	▲46.45
CPI(M)	Ajit Kumar Das	15,331	46.83%	▼4.62
INC	Gouranga Das Talukdar	555	1.70%	▼43.29
NOTA	None of the Above	269	0.82%	New
AITC	Rani Singha	249	0.76%	New
Margin of victory		561	1.71%	▼4.76
Turnout		32,739	89.50%	▼1.87
Registered electors		36,321		▲13.16
BJP gain from CPI(M)		Swing	▼2.91	

=== 2013 Assembly election ===
2013 Tripura Legislative Assembly election: Panisagar
Party	Candidate	Votes	%	±%
CPI(M)	Subodh Chandra Das	15,196	51.45%	▲1.65
INC	Radhika Ranjan Das	13,285	44.98%	▲1.28
BJP	Suranjan Kumar Das	618	2.09%	▼0.85
AMB	Narayan Malakar	435	1.47%	▲0.43
Margin of victory		1,911	6.47%	▲0.37
Turnout		29,534	92.13%	▲2.87
Registered electors		32,098		
CPI(M) hold		Swing	▲1.65	

=== 2008 Assembly election ===
2008 Tripura Legislative Assembly election: Panisagar
Party	Candidate	Votes	%	±%
CPI(M)	Subodh Chandra Das	13,942	49.80%	▲1.23
INC	Radhika Ranjan Das	12,234	43.70%	▲3.09
BJP	Dhananjay Debnath	824	2.94%	▼5.04
Independent	Pijush Kanti Debnath	532	1.90%	New
AMB	Narayan Malakar	292	1.04%	New
AIFB	Noor Islam	171	0.61%	New
Margin of victory		1,708	6.10%	▼1.87
Turnout		27,995	89.26%	▲13.43
Registered electors		31,406		
CPI(M) hold		Swing	▲1.23	

=== 2003 Assembly election ===
2003 Tripura Legislative Assembly election: Panisagar
Party	Candidate	Votes	%	±%
CPI(M)	Subodh Chandra Das	10,931	48.57%	▲2.81
INC	Bikash Sharma	9,138	40.61%	▲4.48
BJP	Tamal Kanti Deb	1,797	7.99%	▼8.50
Independent	Ajoy Kumar Das	407	1.81%	New
NCP	Golapjit Rajkumar	231	1.03%	New
Margin of victory		1,793	7.97%	▼1.67
Turnout		22,504	75.78%	▲0.74
Registered electors		29,723		▲15.21
CPI(M) hold		Swing	▲2.81	

=== 1998 Assembly election ===
1998 Tripura Legislative Assembly election: Panisagar
Party	Candidate	Votes	%	±%
CPI(M)	Subodh Chandra Das	8,852	45.77%	▼2.06
INC	Kalidas Dutta	6,988	36.13%	▼1.12
BJP	Tamal Kanti Deb	3,188	16.48%	▲11.94
JD	Anil Debnath	163	0.84%	New
AMB	Hara Kumar Sarkar	134	0.69%	▼2.00
Margin of victory		1,864	9.64%	▼0.93
Turnout		19,341	76.58%	▲1.53
Registered electors		25,799		▲6.25
CPI(M) hold		Swing	▼2.06	

=== 1993 Assembly election ===
1993 Tripura Legislative Assembly election: Panisagar
Party	Candidate	Votes	%	±%
CPI(M)	Subodh Chandra Das	8,528	47.82%	▼2.11
INC	Ashutosh Das	6,643	37.25%	▼4.44
Independent	Sarpialjoy Hranglong (Halam)	1,006	5.64%	New
BJP	Madhusudan Dutta	810	4.54%	New
AMB	Raj Mohan Nath	481	2.70%	New
Independent	Anil Chandra Debnath	279	1.56%	New
Margin of victory		1,885	10.57%	▲2.33
Turnout		17,832	74.27%	▼6.47
Registered electors		24,281		▲24.64
CPI(M) hold		Swing	▼2.11	

=== 1988 Assembly election ===
1988 Tripura Legislative Assembly election: Panisagar
Party	Candidate	Votes	%	±%
CPI(M)	Subodh Chandra Das	7,774	49.94%	▼3.51
INC	Ashutosh Das	6,491	41.69%	▲19.66
Independent	Raj Mohan Nath	749	4.81%	New
Independent	Charitra Mohan Sarkar	427	2.74%	New
Independent	Bibekanand Chakraborty	127	0.82%	New
Margin of victory		1,283	8.24%	▼20.69
Turnout		15,568	81.07%	▲1.93
Registered electors		19,481		▲22.25
CPI(M) hold		Swing	▼3.51	

=== 1983 Assembly election ===
1983 Tripura Legislative Assembly election: Panisagar
Party	Candidate	Votes	%	±%
CPI(M)	Subodh Chandra Das	6,642	53.45%	▼4.95
Independent	Bibekananda Chakraborty	3,047	24.52%	New
INC	Ashutosh Das	2,738	22.03%	▲15.70
Margin of victory		3,595	28.93%	▼21.31
Turnout		12,427	79.32%	▲4.38
Registered electors		15,935		▲22.59
CPI(M) hold		Swing		

=== 1977 Assembly election ===
1977 Tripura Legislative Assembly election: Panisagar
Party	Candidate	Votes	%	±%
CPI(M)	Subodh Chandra Das	5,588	58.40%	New
Independent	Debendra Chandra Nath	781	8.16%	New
TPCC	Fakharuddin Ahmed	731	7.64%	New
INC	Jitendra Kumar Das	606	6.33%	New
JP	Anil Krishna Nath	542	5.66%	New
Independent	Mihir Chandra Nag Chowdhury	481	5.03%	New
Independent	Raghunath Das	363	3.79%	New
Independent	Darkupril Halam	202	2.11%	New
Independent	Kali Mohan Das	138	1.44%	New
Independent	Golapjit Rajlkumar	98	1.02%	New
Margin of victory		4,807	50.24%	
Turnout		9,568	75.21%	
Registered electors		12,999		
CPI(M) win (new seat)				

== See also ==
- List of constituencies of the Tripura Legislative Assembly
- North Tripura district
