= Kalyani Roy =

Indian politician

Kalyani Roy (born 14 January 1967) is an Indian politician, representing the Bharatiya Janata Party and serving as the current Government Chief Whip in the Tripura Legislative Assembly and MLA of the Teliamura constituency since March 2018. She is the first woman to hold the office of Government Chief Whip in the state of Tripura.
