= List of Tripura cricketers =

This is a list of cricketers who have played first-class, List A or Twenty20 cricket for Tripura cricket team. The team plays in Indian domestic cricket and was granted first-class status in 1985.

== B ==
- Rajesh Banik
- Subrata Banik
- Bijan Bhattacharjee

== C ==
- Timir Chanda
- Abhijit Chakraborty

== D ==
- Shankar Das
- Babul Datta
- Samir Deb
- Mitan Debbarma (Note: Debbarma, who was born in 1997, played in a single match for the team in the 2016–17 Vijay Hazare Trophy. He did not score a run in the 14 balls he faced and did not bowl. He had previously played under-19 cricket for the team and went on to play at under-23 level for them.)
- Jayanta Debnath
- Sibram Dey
- Rajib Dutta

== G ==
- Mihir Das Gupta
- Pallab Das Gupta

== J ==
- Vineet Jain

== L ==
- Satrajit Lahiri

== M ==
- Samir Mujumdar
- Manisankar Murasingh

== N ==
- Bijoy Nath

== P ==
- Biswajit Paul
- Sridam Paul

== R ==
- Monimoy Roy

== S ==
- Wriddhiman Saha
- Rajat Kanti Sen
- Vijay Shankar
- Swapnil Singh
