= 2024–25 Ranji Trophy Group A =

- Dates: 11 October 2024 – 2 February 2025
- Administrator: BCCI
- Cricket format: First-class cricket
- Tournament format: Round-robin then knockout
- Host: India
- Participants: 8
- Matches: 28

The 2024–25 Ranji Trophy is the 90th season of the Ranji Trophy, the premier first-class cricket tournament in India. It is contested by 38 teams, divided into four elite groups and a plate group, with eight teams in Group A. It took place between 11 October 2024 to 2 February 2025.

== Points table ==
| Pos | Team | Pld | W | L | T | D | NR | Pts | Quot |
|---|---|---|---|---|---|---|---|---|---|
| 1 | Jammu and Kashmir | 7 | 5 | 0 | 0 | 2 | 0 | 35 | 1.577 |
| 2 | Mumbai | 7 | 4 | 2 | 0 | 1 | 0 | 29 | 1.744 |
| 3 | Baroda | 7 | 4 | 2 | 0 | 1 | 0 | 27 | 1.301 |
| 4 | Services | 7 | 3 | 3 | 0 | 1 | 0 | 23 | 0.864 |
| 5 | Maharashtra | 7 | 2 | 3 | 0 | 2 | 0 | 17 | 1.063 |
| 6 | Odisha | 7 | 2 | 3 | 0 | 1 | 1 | 17 | 0.715 |
| 7 | Tripura | 7 | 1 | 1 | 0 | 4 | 1 | 14 | 1.233 |
| 8 | Meghalaya | 7 | 0 | 7 | 0 | 0 | 0 | 0 | 0.343 |

Source: ESPNcricinfo

Advances to Quarter-final Relegated to Plate Group for next season

== Fixtures ==
=== Round 1 ===
11–14 October 2024
Scorecard

| Tirpura | v | Odisha |

Match abandoned
Maharaja Bir Bikram College Stadium, Agartala
Points: Tripura 1, Odisha 1

11–14 October 2024
Scorecard

| Baroda; 290 (103.1 overs) & 185 (60.3 overs) | v | Mumbai; 214 (62.2 overs) & 177 (48.2 overs) |

Baroda won by 84 runs
Kotambi Stadium, Vadodara
Points: Baroda 6, Mumbai 0

11–14 October 2024
Scorecard

| Jammu and Kashmir; 519/7d (150 overs) & 38/0 (10 overs) | v | Maharashtra; 428 (130.3 overs) |

Match drawn
Sher-e-Kashmir Stadium, Srinagar
Points: Jammu and Kashmir 3, Maharashtra 1

11–14 October 2024
Scorecard

| Services; 402 (132.4 overs) | v | Meghalaya; 233 (86 overs) & 104 (57.5 overs) (f/o) |

Services won by an innings and 65 runs
Palam A Stadium, Delhi
Points: Services 7, Meghalaya 0

=== Round 2 ===
18–21 October 2024
Scorecard

| Tripura; 377/8d (78.4 overs) | v | Meghalaya; 222 (77.4 overs) & 138 (37.5 overs) (f/o) |

Tripura won by an innings and 17 runs
Meghalaya Cricket Association Cricket Ground, Shillong
Points: Tripura 7, Meghalaya 0

18–21 October 2024
Scorecard

| Jammu and Kashmir; 270 (70.3 overs) & 270/7d (73.2 overs) | v | Odisha; 272 (87.5 overs) & 112/8 (80.4 overs) |

Match drawn
Barabati Stadium, Cuttack
Points: Jammu and Kashmir 1, Odisha 3

18–21 October 2024
Scorecard

| Baroda; 477/6d (150 overs) & 134/1d (14.4 overs) | v | Services; 271 (86.3 overs) & 275 (82.2 overs) |

Baroda won by 65 runs
Palam A Ground, Delhi
Points: Baroda 6, Services 0

18–21 October 2024
Scorecard

| Maharashtra; 126 (31.4 overs) & 388 (106.3 overs) | v | Mumbai; 441 (103.1 overs) & 75/1 (13.3 overs) |

Mumbai won by 9 wickets
Sharad Pawar Cricket Academy BKC, Mumbai
Points: Mumbai 6, Maharashtra 0

=== Round 3 ===
26–29 October 2024
Scorecard

| Mumbai; 450 (122.4 overs) & 123/6d (43 overs) | v | Tripura; 302 (95.4 overs) & 48/0 (22 overs) |

Match drawn
Maharaja Bir Bikram College Stadium, Agartala
Points: Mumbai 3, Tripura 1

26–29 October 2024
Scorecard

| Odisha; 193 (65 overs) & 165 (34 overs) | v | Baroda; 456 (128.4 overs) |

Baroda won by an innings and 98 runs
Kotambi Stadium, Vadodara
Points: Baroda 7, Odisha 0

26–29 October 2024
Scorecard

| Services; 71 (25.1 overs) & 132 (32 overs) | v | Jammu and Kashmir; 228 (62 overs) |

Jammu and Kashmir won by an innings and 25 runs
Sher-e-Kashmir Stadium, Srinagar
Points: Jammu and Kashmir 7, Services 0

26–29 October 2024
Scorecard

| Meghalaya; 276 (88.3 overs) & 185 (55.5 overs) | v | Maharashtra; 361 (106.2 overs) & 104/0 (21.1 overs) |

Maharashtra won by 10 wickets
Chhatrapati Sambhajinagar Ground, Aurangabad
Points: Maharashtra 7, Meghalaya 0

=== Round 4 ===
6–9 November 2024
Scorecard

| Meghalaya; 73 (37.3 overs) & 195 (59.1 overs) | v | Jammu and Kashmir; 194 (51.4 overs) & 77/3 (15.4 overs) |

Jammu and Kashmir won by 7 wickets
Meghalaya Cricket Association Cricket Ground, Shillong
Points: Jammu and Kashmir 6, Meghalaya 0

6–9 November 2024
Scorecard

| Baroda; 235 (82.2 overs) & 241/4 (99 overs) | v | Tripura; 482/7d (120.1 overs) |

Match drawn
Maharaja Bir Bikram College Stadium, Agartala
Points: Tripura 3, Baroda 1

6–9 November 2024
Scorecard

| Services; 293 (110.3 overs) & 230 (73.5 overs) | v | Maharashtra; 185 (58.5 overs) & 303 (100.5 overs) |

Services won by 35 runs
Maharashtra Cricket Association Stadium, Pune
Points: Services 6, Maharashtra 0

6–9 November 2024
Scorecard

| Mumbai; 602/4d (123.5 overs) | v | Odisha; 285 (94.3 overs) & 214 (72.5 overs) |

Mumbai won by an innings and 103 runs
Sharad Pawar Cricket Academy BKC, Mumbai
Points: Mumbai 7, Odisha 0

=== Round 5 ===
13–16 November 2024
Scorecard

| Maharashtra; 162 (54 overs) & 166 (53.4 overs) | v | Odisha; 200 (82.2 overs) & 130/7 (36.2 overs) |

Odisha won by 3 wickets
Barabati Stadium, Cuttack
Points: Odisha 6, Maharashtra 0

13–16 November 2024
Scorecard

| Meghalaya; 103 (36.5 overs) & 78 (17.5 overs) | v | Baroda; 442 (71.3 overs) |

Baroda won by an innings and 261 runs
Kotambi Stadium, Vadodara
Points: Baroda 7, Meghalaya 0

13–16 November 2024
Scorecard

| Tripura; 165 (50.3 overs) & 211 (67 overs) | v | Jammu and Kashmir; 175 (57.4 overs) & 204/6 (56 overs) |

Jammu and Kashmir won by 4 wickets
Hostel Ground JKCA, Jammu
Points: Jammu and Kashmir 6, Tripura 0

13–16 November 2024
Scorecard

| Services; 240 (81 overs) & 182 (62 overs) | v | Mumbai; 288 (73.1 overs) & 137/1 (35.4 overs) |

Mumbai won by 9 wickets
Palam A Ground, Delhi
Points: Mumbai 6, Services 0

=== Round 6 ===
23–26 January 2025
Scorecard

| Tripura; 212 (73.1 overs) & 357/5d (83 overs) | v | Services; 294 (78.3 overs) & 101/2 (19.1 overs) |

Match drawn
Maharaja Bir Bikram College Stadium, Agartala
Points: Tripura 1, Services 3

23–26 January 2025
Scorecard

| Maharashtra; 297 (98.4 overs) & 464/7d (119 overs) | v | Baroda; 145 (33.1 overs) & 177 (36 overs) |

Maharashtra won by 439 runs
Hutatma Anant Kanhere Maidan, Nasik
Points: Maharashtra 6, Baroda 0

23–26 January 2025
Scorecard

| Mumbai; 120 (33.2 overs) & 290 (74 overs) | v | Jammu and Kashmir; 206 (41.3 overs) & 207/5 (49 overs) |

Jammu and Kashmir won by 5 wickets
Sharad Pawar Cricket Academy BKC, Mumbai
Points: Jammu and Kashmir 6, Mumbai 0

23–26 January 2025
Scorecard

| Meghalaya; 198 (64.3 overs) & 294 (92.2 overs) | v | Odisha; 548/7d (111.2 overs) |

Odisha won by an innings and 56 runs
Meghalaya Cricket Association Cricket Ground, Shillong
Points: Odisha 7, Meghalaya 0

=== Round 7 ===
30 January–2 February 2025
Scorecard

| Jammu and Kashmir; 246 (71.3 overs) & 284 (106.4 overs) | v | Baroda; 166 (62.1 overs) & 58/2 (16 overs) |

Stumps, Day 3
Reliance Stadium, Vadodara

30 January–2 February 2025
Scorecard

| Tripura; 270 (101.2 overs) & 135/2 (30 overs) | v | Maharashtra; 418 (124.1 overs) |

Stumps, Day 3
Indira Gandhi Stadium, Solapur

30 January–2 February 2025
Scorecard

| Meghalaya; 86 (24.3 overs) & 129 (30.1 overs) | v | Mumbai; 671/7d (140.5 overs) |

Mumbai won by an innings and 456 runs
Sharad Pawar Cricket Academy BKC, Mumbai
Points: Mumbai 7, Meghalaya 0

30 January–2 February 2025
Scorecard

| Odisha; 180 (62.2 overs) & 394 (118.3 overs) | v | Services; 199 (54.4 overs) & 46/0 (13 overs) |

Stumps, Day 3
DRIEMS Ground, Cuttack
