= Narsinghgarh International Cricket Stadium =

Cricket Stadium in Tripura, India

Narsingarh International Cricket Stadium
- Interactive map of Narsingarh International Cricket Stadium

Ground information
- Location: Narsingarh, West Tripura, Tripura, India
- Country: India
- Coordinates: 23.90214°N 91.24901°E
- Capacity: 25,000
- Owner: Tripura Cricket Association
- Architect: RKS Construction Pvt. Ltd.
- Operator: Tripura Cricket Association

Team information
Tripura cricket team	(TBA)
Kolkata Knight Riders	(TBA)

Narsinghgarh International Cricket Stadium is an under construction International cricket stadium in Tripura, India. After completion of construction, this stadium will be the home of Tripura cricket team and Tripura women's cricket team. It is owned and operated by Tripura Cricket Association (TCA). The total capacity of the stadium will be 25,000 seats. Once the stadium is built, it will be the first International Cricket stadium in Tripura.

== History ==
In 2017, the Chief Minister of Tripura Manik Sarkar has laid the foundation stone of Narsinghgarh international cricket stadium. The stadium will be the second largest stadium in North-East India that could host international matches after Guwahati. The stadium will be built on 14.22 acres of land with an estimated cost of ₹200 Crore. Fifty percent of the funding for the project would be provided by the Board of Control for Cricket in India (BCCI), with the remaining costs to be covered by the Tripura Cricket Association (TCA).
