= Polytechnic Institute Ground =

Multi-use stadium in Agartala, India

Coordinates: 23°54′10″N 91°14′49″E

- Tripura Institute of Technology Ground
- Location: Agartala, Tripura, India
- Establishment: 1989
- Capacity: 15,000
- Owner: Tripura Institute of Technology
- Operator: Tripura Cricket Association
- Tenants: Tripura cricket team
- End names
- Airport End; Narshingarh End
- As of 4 September 2015; Source: Cricinfo

Polytechnic Institute Ground or Narshingarh Cricket Ground is a multi-use stadium in Agartala, India. It is used mostly for cricket matches.

When it was built in 1989–90 it had the first turf pitch in Tripura. The ground is located at the Tripura Institute of Technology at Narsingarh, a suburb of Agartala, two kilometres from the Agartala Airport.
