= Rajib Dutta =

Rajib Dutta can refer to:

- Rajib Dutta (cricketer, born 1971), an Indian cricketer
- Rajib Dutta (cricketer, born 1980), an Indian cricketer
