= Udiyan Bose =

Indian cricketer (born 1993)

Personal information
- Full name: Udiyan Uttam Bose
- Born: 7 December 1993 (age 32); Agartala, Tripura, India
- Batting: Right handed
- Bowling: Right arm offbreak
- Role: Opening Batter

Domestic team information
- Years: Team
- Tripura
- Source: Cricinfo, 11 October 2015

Udiyan Bose (born 7 December 1993) is an Indian first-class cricketer who plays for Tripura.
