= Banamalipur (disambiguation) =

Banamalipur may refer to:

- Banamalipur, a locality in Agartala, Tripura
- Banamalipur (Tripura Vidhan Sabha constituency)
- Banamalipur, Hooghly, a village in Hooghly district, West Bengal
