= Jayanta Debnath (cricketer) =

Indian cricketer (born 1983)

Personal information
- Born: 29 July 1983; Agartala, Tripura, India

Jayanta Debnath (born 29 July 1983 in Agartala) is an Indian first-class cricketer who played for Tripura .
