= Rajat Kanti Sen =

Indian cricketer

Rajat Kanti Sen is an Indian first-class cricketer who played for Tripura. He is also a cricket coach. He was the first Ranji Trophy captain from Tripura.

== See also ==
- List of Tripura cricketers
