= Asrani (surname) =

Asrani is a common surname among Sindhi Hindus. Like other Sindhi Hindus, Asrani's migrated to India, when Sindh was given to Pakistan in the Partition of India. Many of them migrated to other countries like the United States, United Kingdom, etc. A majority of Asranis are in Mumbai, Maharashtra and California, United States.

Most of the Sindhi Surnames end with either '-ja' or -'-ani'. -ani in the surname refers to clan, or name of their forefathers. For example, people having the surname Mulchandani, Mulchand is the name of their ancestor. Similarly, Asrani is derived from Asromal (name of their ancestor).

Asrani means "hope" (as "Asro" / "Asra" means "hope" in Sindhi language).

Asrani is the name of:

- Asrani (born 1940), Govardhan Asrani, popular Bollywood actor
- Apurva Asrani (born 1978), filmmaker based in Mumbai, Maharashtra, India
- Naveen Asrani, former cricketer who played for Tripura
- Roma Asrani, Indian actress
