= Subhrajit Roy =

Indian cricketer (born 1987)

Personal information
- Full name: Subhrajit Shaktiranjan Roy
- Born: 16 July 1987 (age 39); Udaipur, Tripura, India
- Source: Cricinfo, 11 October 2015

Subhrajit Roy (born 16 July 1987) is an Indian first-class cricketer who plays for Tripura.
