= Pratibadi Kalam =

Pratibadi Kalam, formerly Kalamer Shakti, is an Indian Bengali language daily newspaper published from Agartala, Tripura. Anal Roy Choudhury is the founder and chief editor of the newspaper.

== History ==
It was founded in 1981.

It was attacked several times by the miscreants.

== Coverages ==
The newspaper covers a wide range of topics, including politics, business, sports, entertainment, and more.

It has a wide readership, and its digital presence has made it accessible to people all over the world.
