= Ramnagar, Agartala =

Coordinates: 23.843°N 91.262°E

Ramnagar is a locality in Agartala, Tripura.

The rectangular "Gridiron" network of Ramangar dated from the rules of Rajahs; one of the earliest planned neighborhood in Tripura.

Ramnagar is located at the north-western part of the town Agartala, the capital of Tripura.

Ramnagarhas many divisions in it. As much as 12 divisions are in Ramnagar. They are named as Ramnagar No.1, Ramnagar No.2, etc.

== Politics ==
Ramnagar assembly constituency is part of the Tripura West (Lok Sabha constituency).
