= Krishnanagar, Agartala =

Coordinates: 23.842°N 91.275°E

Krishna Nagar is one of the most densely populated parts of the Agartala city and located almost in the middle of Agartala.

== Places ==
Royal Ujjayanta Palace which is now visitors point formerly Tripura Legislative Assembly is situated west part of Krishna Nagar. The most visited temples of Agartala like Mehar Kalibari, Jagannnatha temple, Laxminarayana temple, Durgabari temple, Alekhbaba temple and Satsangha Bihar are situated very near and within this locality. Most of the renowned persons of the State of Tripura live here. Once Rabindranath Tagore also stayed in Krishna Nagar at the House of Colonel Mahim Thakur.

Most popular restaurants of the Agartala city like Pahuna, Popcorn, D-Cafe, Cilantro, Curlies, Royal Cuisine, Rolling Joint, Feast, Wow Shawarma, Momos n More, Bakku's Bharta, Trinayani, Chathainog, Abba Cafe, Sartaj Cake Parlour & Restaurant, Cakes & Buns, Bonsai Restaurant, Tandur Chai, T4U, Delight, Tandoor Hut, Nibedito, Sherwali Sweets, Gopal Mistanno Bhandar, Momo Magic Cafe & Restaurant are located here.

A set up is there for two days weekly market named Kaipeng bazar every Tuesday and Friday in front of Magnet club. Krishna Nagar is very popular among the youngsters and a very common place for hanging out.

== Schools ==
Some of the famous schools of Agartala like Umakanta Academy, Bijoy Kumar Girls School, Shishu Bihar English Medium School, Pragati Vidyabhawan, Dasarath Deb Memorial Hall, Muktodhara Auditorium, Tripura Road Transport Corporation Terminus are situated in this area. Even the DM's Office of West Tripura District, Tripura Public Service Commission, Directorate of Agriculture, Birchandra Public Library, IGM Hospital and Rabindra Satabarshiki Bhawan are located adjacent to Krishna Nagar.

== Culture ==
The inhabitants of Krishna Nagar include both Tripuri and Bengali communities. The celebration of Durga Puja is common in the locality, and it is organized by some community clubs like Magnet Club, Sanghati Club, and Cosmopolitan Club.

Similarly Christmas is celebrated with the same manner in Agartala city by Baptist church, Suparibagan, Krishna Nagar.

Kokborak and Bengali are spoken in this locality.
