= Agartala flyover =

Flyover

Coordinates: 23.8263952°N 91.2672445°E

Route information
- Length: 2.26 km (1.40 mi)

Major junctions
- East end: Umakanta Academy, Melarmath
- South end: Bardowali

Location
- Country: India
- States: Tripura
- Major cities: Agartala

Highway system
- Roads in India; Expressways; National; State; Asian

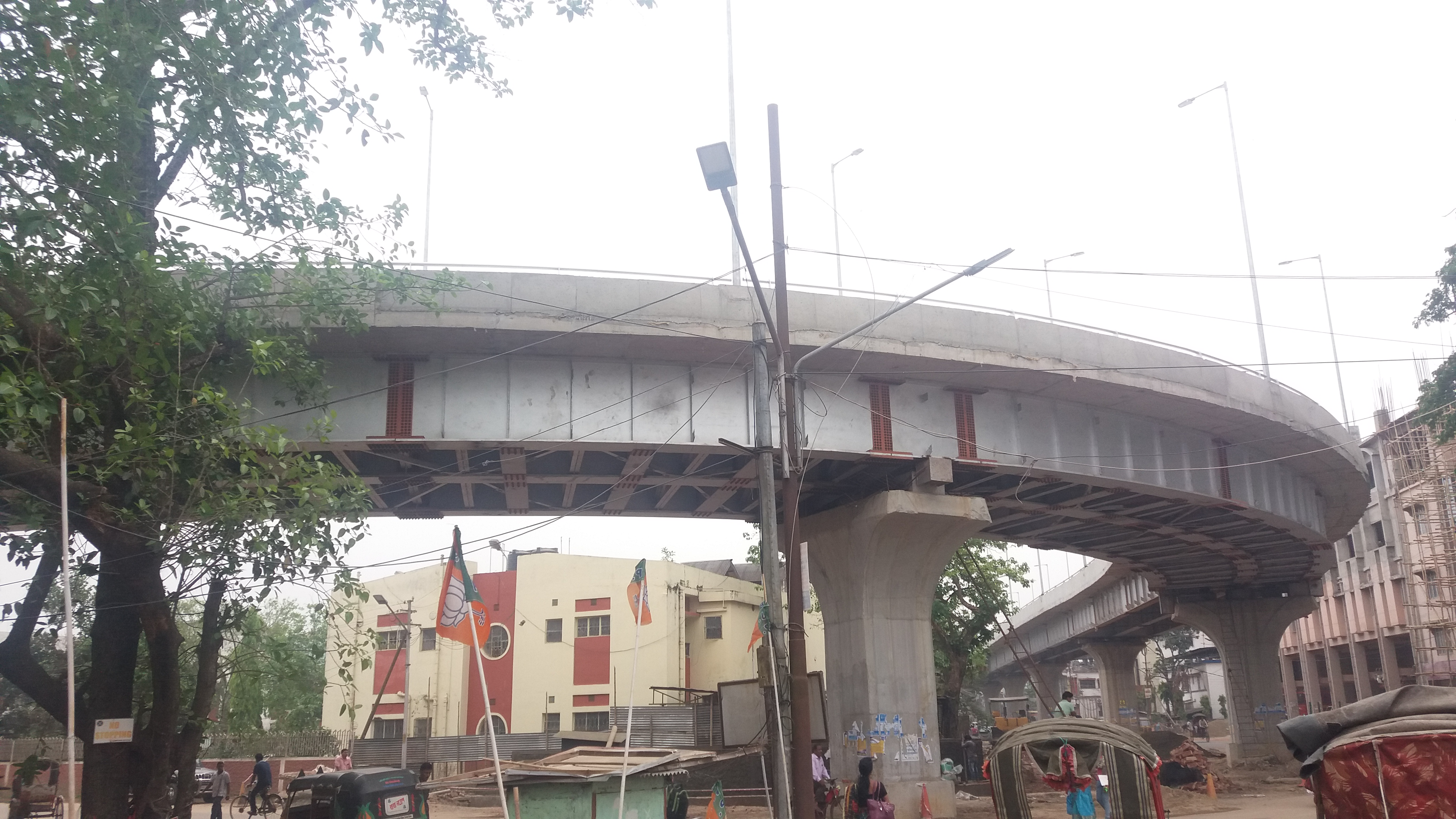
Agartala Flyover

The Agartala flyover is a flyover in the Indian state of Tripura. The flyover, the first in the state, is 2.26 km long, stretching from the Police Lines (Drop Gate) in southern Agartala to Fire Brigade Chowmuhuni (square) in the heart of the city. The Construction is carried out by NCC and it was opened in 2019. The estimated cost of the project is around Rupees 250 crore (Rs. 2.5 billion).

== See also ==
- National highways of India
- Overpass
- Agartala
