= Rajesh Banik =

Indian cricketer (1984–2025)

Personal information
- Full name: Rajesh Dhrubalal Banik
- Born: 12 December 1984; Agartala, Tripura, India
- Died: 31 October 2025 (aged 40); Agartala, Tripura, India
- Batting: Right-handed
- Bowling: Right-arm leg-spin

Domestic team information
- Years: Team
- 2000/01–2018/19: Tripura

Career statistics
Competition	FC	LA	T20
Matches	42	24	18
Runs scored	1469	378	203
Batting average	19.32	18.00	11.94
100s/50s	0/6	1/0	0/0
Top score	93	101*	47
Balls bowled	207	136	18
Wickets	2	8	1
Bowling average	74.50	16.25	37.00
5 wickets in innings	0	0	0
10 wickets in match	0	0	0
Best bowling	1/5	4/40	1/22
Catches/stumpings	33/–	7/–	3/–
- Source: CricketArchive, 1 November 2021

Rajesh Banik (12 December 1984 – 31 October 2025) was an Indian cricketer who played first-class and List A cricket for Tripura from 2000 to 2018.

In a 50-over match against Orissa in February 2007, Banik scored 101 not out off 103 balls in Tripura's total of 219 for 9. He captained Tripura to a four-wicket victory in a Ranji Trophy match in 2007–08, top-scoring with 76 in the second innings when Tripura needed 270 to beat Kerala.

Banik was involved in a "freak road accident" on the night of 31 October 2025, and was pronounced dead on arrival after being rushed to the GB Pant Hospital in Agartala. He was 40.
