= Shankar Das =

Indian cricketer

Personal information
- Full name: Shankar Das
- Born: Tripura, India
- Batting: Right-handed
- Bowling: Right-arm medium

Domestic team information
- Years: Team
- 1989-90: Tripura
- Source: Cricinfo, 23 June 2021

Shankar Das is an Indian cricketer who has played only one first-class match in the 1989/90 season for Tripura Das failed to make an impact in his only appearance and never played for Tripura again.
