= Daily Desher Katha =

Daily News Paper in Agartala

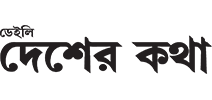
- Type: Daily newspaper
- Owner: Daily Desher Katha Trust
- Publisher: Samir Paul
- Editor: Samir Paul
- Associate editor: Milan De Sarkar, Haradhan De
- Staff writers: Tapas Debnath, Pranab Chakroborty, Anjan De, Rahul Sinha etc.
- Founded: 1979
- Political alignment: Communist
- Language: Bengali
- Headquarters: Agartala, Tripura
- Website: dailydesherkatha.net

Daily Desher Katha (Bengali: ডেইলি দেশের কথা Ḍeili Desher Kôtha) is a Bengali daily newspaper published from Agartala. It is a daily publication of the state committee of CPI(M), Tripura.

== History ==
Desher Katha was founded in 1979. The newspaper came under the severe attack launched on it the during the chaotic Congress-TUJS coalition regime.
