= Maharaja Bir Bikram College Stadium =

Multi-use cricket stadium in Agartala, Tripura, India

Coordinates: 23°49′41″N 91°17′49″E

Maharaja Bir Bikram Stadium
- MBB Stadium
- Interactive map of Maharaja Bir Bikram Stadium
- Location: Agartala, Tripura, India
- Country: India
- Establishment: 1998; 28 years ago
- Capacity: 30,000
- Owner: Government of Tripura
- Operator: Tripura Cricket Association
- Tenants: Tripura cricket team
- End names
- Pavilion End; City End
- As of 22 June 2014; Source: Maharaja Bir Bikram College Stadium, ESPNcricinfo

Maharaja Bir Bikram Stadium is a multi-use stadium in Agartala, India. It is used mostly for cricket matches. The stadium holds 30,000 people and was built in 1998.

== Name and location ==
The stadium is named after former Tripura Maharaja Bir Bikram Kishore Debbarman. The ground is located in the Maharaja Bir Bikram College campus.

== History ==
The stadium has been the home ground for the Tripura cricket team since 1998. There had been at least 44 first-class matches held.
