= Timir Chanda =

Indian cricketer (born 1975)

Personal information
- Full name: Timir Kajal Chanda
- Born: 1 January 1975 (age 51); Agartala, Tripura, India
- Batting: Right-handed
- Bowling: Right-arm medium

Domestic team information
- Years: Team
- 1995/96–2013/14: Tripura

Career statistics
Competition	FC	LA	T20
Matches	71	55	7
Runs scored	2366	661	27
Batting average	19.88	14.68	5.40
100s/50s	1/11	0/1	0/0
Top score	134	58*	13
Balls bowled	7757	2026	143
Wickets	136	46	6
Bowling average	28.55	36.50	35.16
5 wickets in innings	7	0	0
10 wickets in match	1	0	0
Best bowling	8/133	4/28	3/37
Catches/stumpings	29/0	7/0	0/0
- Source: CricketArchive, 21 December 2016

Timir Chanda (born 1 January 1975) is a former Indian cricketer, coach and administrator. An opening bowler, he played first-class and List A cricket for Tripura from 1995 to 2013.

In the Ranji Trophy in 2010–11, Chanda took 4 for 35 and 7 for 116 in Tripura's seven-wicket victory over Goa at Porvorim. His best bowling figures were 8 for 133 against Himachal Pradesh in 2011–12, when Himachal Pradesh nevertheless won by an innings. He scored 134, his only century, in a drawn match against Goa in 2002–03.

He represents the United Friends cricket club on the executive committee of the Tripura Cricket Association.
