= Ajker Fariad =

Bengali language newspaper

Ajker Fariad is an Indian Bengali language daily newspaper published from Agartala, Tripura.

== See also ==
- Agartala
