= Hachukni Kok =

Indian newspaper

Hachukni Kok is a newspaper of Tripura, India. As of 2009, it is the sole newspaper daily published in Kokborok language.

"Most of the newspapers in the state are published in Bengali, except for one Kokborok daily (Hachukni Kok), one Manipuri weekly (Marup), two English dailies and three bilingual weeklies."
