= Banamalipur =

- Locality
- Interactive map of Banamalipur
- Coordinates: 23°50′22″N 91°17′33″E
- Country: India
- State: Tripura
- District: West Tripura
- Elevation: 17 m (56 ft)
- Time zone: UTC+05:30 (IST)
- ISO 3166 code: IN-TR
- Website: tripura.gov.in

Banamalipur is a locality in Agartala, Tripura, India.

== Politics ==
Banamalipur assembly constituency is part of Tripura West (Lok Sabha constituency), Tripura, India.
