= Vineet Jain (cricketer) =

Indian cricketer (born 1972)

Personal information
- Born: 16 May 1972 (age 54); Maler Kotla, Punjab, India
- Batting: Right-handed
- Bowling: Right-arm medium

Domestic team information
- Years: Team
- 1993/94–2001/03: Haryana
- 2003/04–2008/09: Tripura

Career statistics
Competition	FC	LA	T20
Matches	80	59	4
Runs scored	701	126	5
Batting average	9.47	5.47	5.00
100s/50s	0/1	0/0	0/0
Top score	58*	25	5*
Balls bowled	13,166	2835	84
Wickets	246	69	8
Bowling average	26.64	26.85	10.12
5 wickets in innings	9	0	0
10 wickets in match	0	0	0
Best bowling	7/29	4/25	2/8
Catches/stumpings	21/0	13/0	3/0
- Source: Cricinfo, 21 December 2016

Vineet Jain (born 16 May 1972) is a former Indian cricketer. An opening bowler, he played first-class cricket for Haryana from 1993 to 2001, and for Tripura from 2004 to 2008.

In 2005-06 he took 2 for 20 and 7 for 29 in Tripura's first first-class victory. In 2006-07 he took 4 for 40 and 5 for 40 in their second victory.
