= Kunjaban =

- Census town
- Interactive map of Kunjaban
- Country: India
- State: Tripura
- District: West Tripura

Population (2001)
  - Total: 7,352

Languages
  - Official: Bengali, Kokborok, English
- Time zone: UTC+5:30 (IST)
- Vehicle registration: TR
- Website: tripura.gov.in

Kunjaban is a census town in West Tripura district in the Indian state of Tripura.

== Demographics ==
At the 2001 India census, Kunjaban had a population of 7352. Males constituted 59% of the population and females 41%. Kunjaban had an average literacy rate of 79%, higher than the national average of 59.5%: male literacy was 85%, and female literacy was 69%. In Kunjaban, 10% of the population was under 6 years of age.
