= Rajib Dutta (Tripura cricketer) =

Indian cricketer (born 1980)

Personal information
- Full name: Rajib Kajalkumar Dutta
- Born: 17 November 1980 (age 45); Agartala, India
- Batting: Right-handed
- Role: Wicketkeeper

Domestic team information
- Years: Team
- 1999-00 to 2011–12: Tripura

Career statistics
Competition	FC	List A	T20
Matches	49	37	14
Runs scored	1314	545	66
Batting average	17.28	18.79	6.00
100s/50s	0/6	0/1	0/0
Top score	81	54	13
Balls bowled	–	–	–
Wickets	–	–	–
Bowling average	–	–	–
5 wickets in innings	–	–	–
10 wickets in match	–	–	–
Best bowling	–	–	–
Catches/stumpings	87/15	42/7	7/1
- Source: Cricinfo, 24 February 2019

Rajib Dutta (born 17 November 1980) is an Indian former cricketer. He played 49 first-class matches for Tripura between 1999 and 2011. Dutta played in Tripura's first five first-class victories, captaining the side in four of them. He now coaches the team.
