= Para (Bengali) =

Bengali word meaning "neighborhood"

Para is a Bengali word (পাড়া) which means a neighbourhood or locality, usually characterised by a strong sense of community. The names of several localities in cities and villages of West Bengal, Bangladesh and Tripura end with the suffix para. Historically, paras often consisted of people of similar livelihood; for example, muchipara means a para where most of the people are Muchis (cobblers). Again, some paras were based on caste; for example, Bamunpara means a para where Brahmins live. However, with the decline of caste-based segregation in India, this form of para has lost much of its significance.

In cities, a person may refer to his neighbourhood as his para.
