= Agartala =

Capital city of Tripura, India

Agartala Agôrtôla (Bengali) Aguli (Kok Borok)
- City
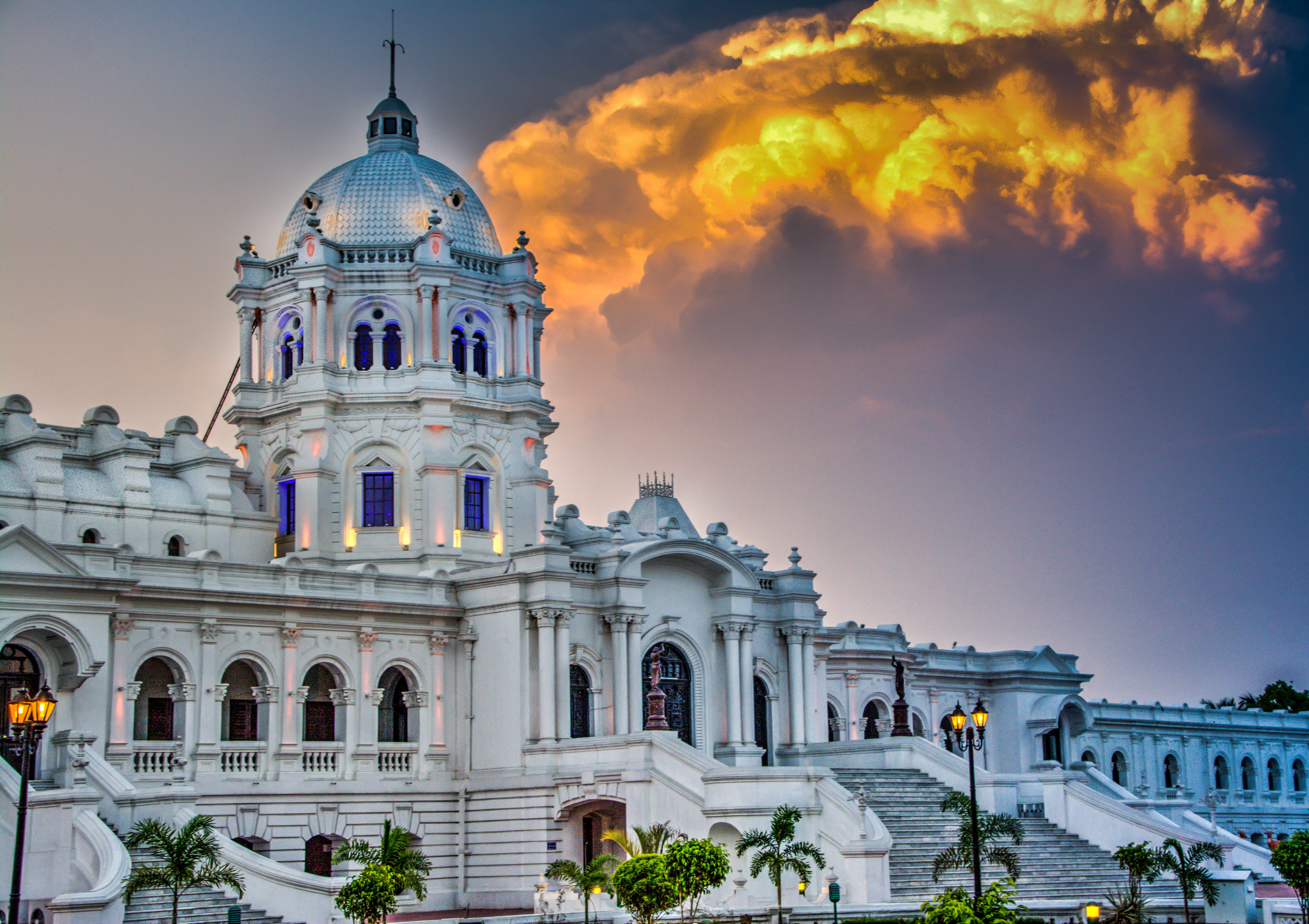
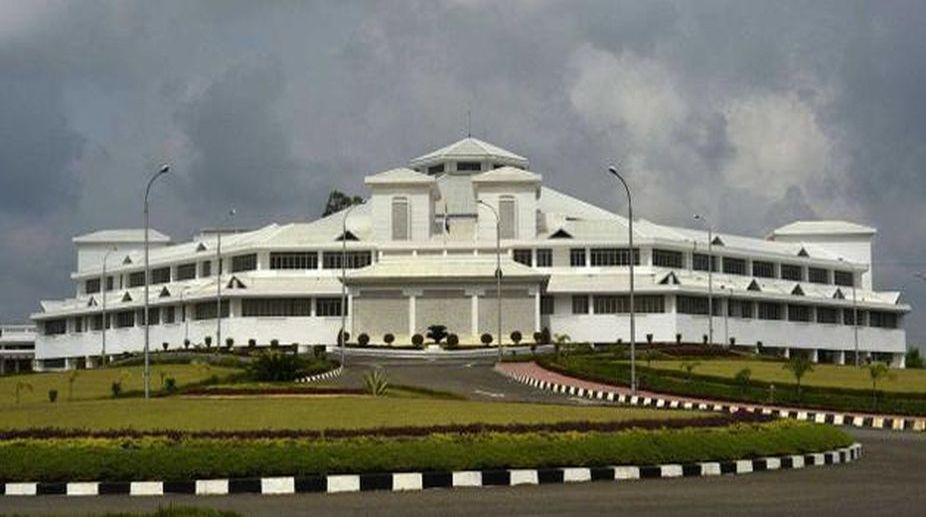
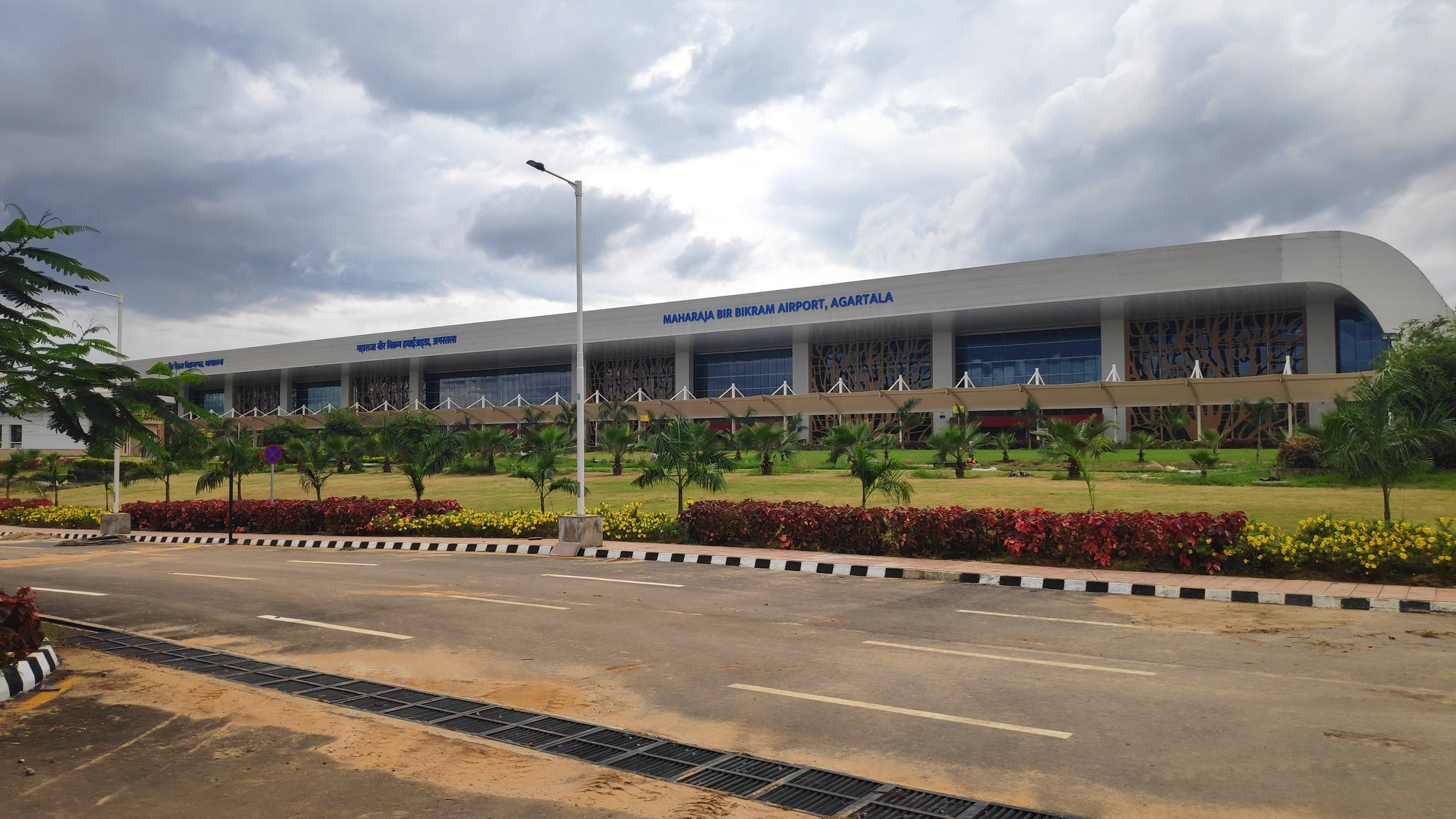
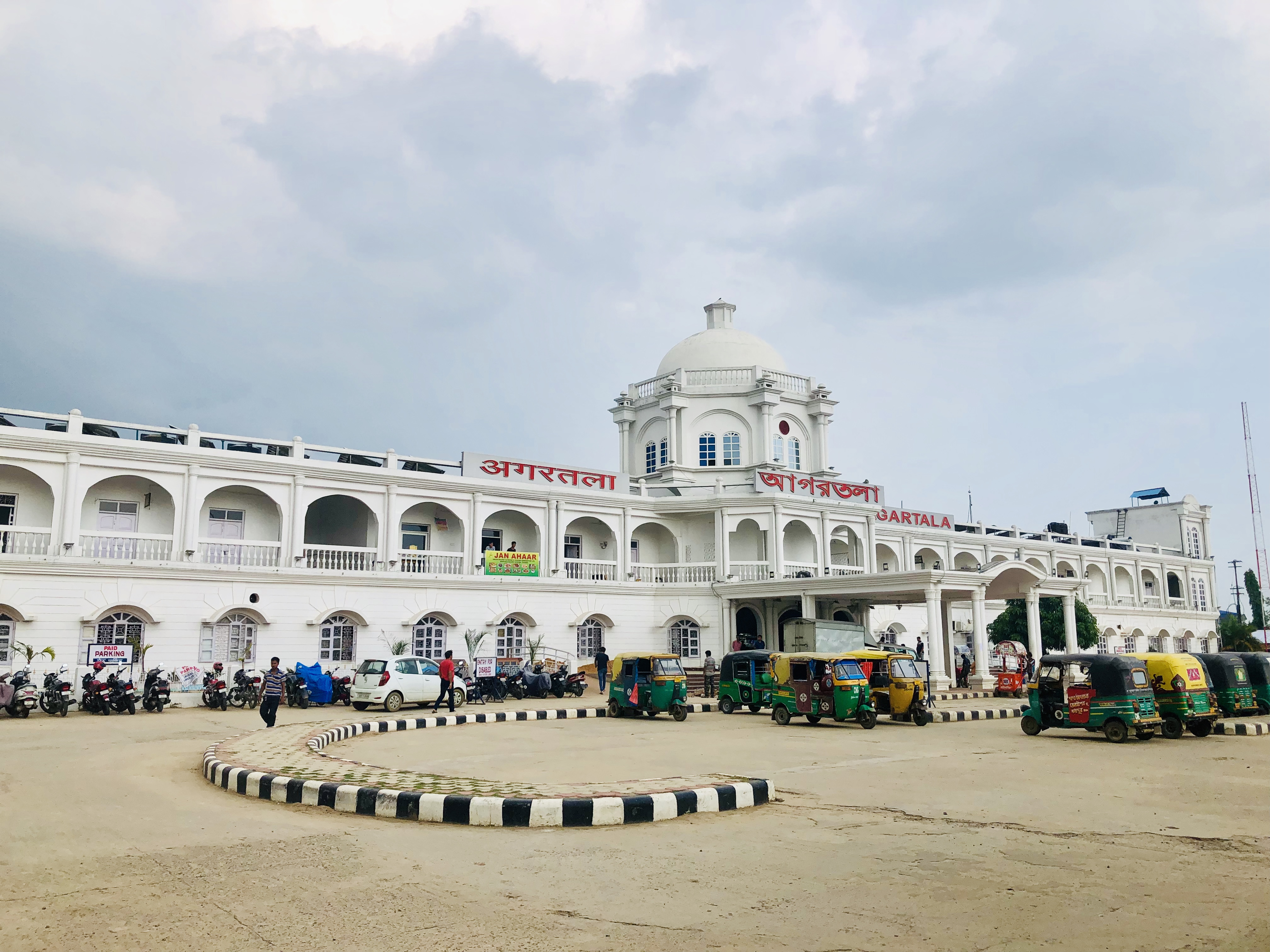
- (clockwise from top) Ujjayanta Palace, Maharaja Bir Bikram Airport, Agartala Railway Station, Tripura Legislative Assembly
- Nickname: Below Agar Tree
- Location of Agartala in Tripura Agartala (India)
- Coordinates: 23°49′53″N 91°17′13″E
- Country: India
- State: Tripura
- District: West Tripura
- Subdivision: Sadar
- Established: 1951

Government
  - Type: Municipal Corporation
  - Body: Agartala Municipal Corporation
  - Mayor: Dipak Majumdar (BJP)
  - Deputy Mayor: Monika Das Datta

Area
  - City: 76.504 km^{2} (29.538 sq mi)
  - Metro: 92 km^{2} (36 sq mi)
- Elevation: 12.80 m (42.0 ft)

Population (2011)
  - City: 400,004
  - Estimate (2022): 578,577
  - Density: 5,228.5/km^{2} (13,542/sq mi)
  - Metro: 512,264
- Demonym: Agartalite or Agulian

Languages
  - Official: Bengali; English; Kokborok
  - Regional: Bengali; Kokborok; Meitei
- Time zone: UTC+5:30 (IST)
- PIN: 799 xxx
- Telephone code: +91 (0) 381
- Vehicle registration: TR 01 XX YYYY
- Major ethnicities: Bengalis; Tripuris; Meiteis
- Website: agartalacity.nic.in

Agartala (/əˈɡɑːrtələ/, Bengali: [ˈagɔɾˌtɔla], Kok Borok: [aguli]) is the capital and the largest city of the Indian state of Tripura, situated on the banks of Haora/Saidra River, about 2 kilometres (1.2 mi) east of the border with Bangladesh and about 2,499 km (1,552 mi) from the national capital, New Delhi. According to 2022 AMC data, Agartala is the second most populous city after Guwahati in Northeast India. It is India's third international internet gateway and being developed under the Smart Cities Mission.

== Etymology ==
Agartala is a derivative of two words, namely agar, a valuable perfume and incense tree of genus Aquilaria, and the suffix tala, meaning underneath, a reference to the density of agarwood trees in the region. The agar tree is historically referred to in the story of the King Raghu who tied up his elephant's feet to an agar tree on the banks of River Lauhitya.

== History ==
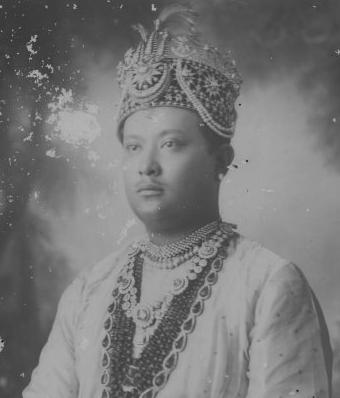
Bir Bikram Kishore Debbarman, one of the most ambitious kings of Tripura

One of the earliest kings of Tripura was Patardan B.C. 1900, long before the Manikya Dynasty. According to folklore, Chitrarath, Drikpati, Dharmapha, Loknath Jivandharan were important kings during the time of B.C. in Agartala.

In the past, Tripura served as the capital to several Hindu kingdoms. Although a timeline of the rulers has not been found, records reveal that the area has been ruled by as many as 179 Hindu rulers, starting from the mythological King Druhya to the last King of Tripura, Kirit Bikram Kishore Manikya. Tripura also came under Mughal rule. The state came under the governance of the British in 1808.

Much later the ancient capital of the then princely state 'Swadhin Tripura' was at Rangamati (Udaipur, South Tripura) by the bank of the Gomati River. In 1760 it was shifted by the Maharaja Krishna Chandra Manikya Bahadur (r.1829–1849) of Manikya Dynasty to present old Agartala by the bank of the river Haora/Saidra and was named 'Haveli'. The capital city of Agartala was founded by Maharaja Krishna Kishore Manikya (1830-49 CE) in 1838 CE. Due to frequent invasion of the Kukis and also to keep easy communication with the British Bengali, the Maharaja Krishna Chandra Manikya started the process of shifting the capital from Old Haveli to New Haveli (present Agartala) in 1849.

During the British Raj, Agartala was the capital of the 'Hill Tippera' state; it became a municipality in 1874–75, and in 1901 had a population of 9,513. The princely state always remained as cake piece to the British and many other invaders. For example, when Arakhan soldiers attacked the old capital of the state the king of Tripura responded by defeating the entire troop. The Agartala Municipality was established during the reign of Maharaja Bir Chandra Manikya (1862–1896) within an area of 3 square miles (8 km^{2}) having a population of only 875 by a royal proclamation in the last part of 1871. A.W.S. Power, the first British political agent for Tipperah was also appointed as the Chairman of the Agartala Municipality in 1872 who held office from 1872 to 1873. The municipality located at the crossing of latitude N 23 –50' and longitude E 91-17' covering 3 km^{2} area during that period.

Bir Bikram Manikya Debbarma is called the founder of the planned city of Agartala. He had gone on a tour to the United Kingdom and was so impressed by the architecture that he started planning a similar township in Agartala. During the 1940s the town was re-organised in a planned manner with new roads and a market building.

The estimated population of Agartala was 522,603 in 2014 after the municipal expansion (189,327 in the 2001 census).

From 1901 to 1971 the city did not experience notable progress in infrastructure development with only an 8 km^{2} of area but 1981 saw Agartala expanding and increasing its connectivity as well as businesses in various fields, the city area expanding to 58.84 km^{2}, greater Agartala is planned as of 2011 with an additional of 92 km^{2}. Agartala had a different type of history from the earlier times of the epic days as it was a princely state and was connected with Bangladesh. Though the East India Company had not arrived in the princely capital of the state but they always remained in a certain in capturing and ruling. The East India Company had set their base of North East India in the Assam province with Shillong as their capital.

Indian Nobel laureate and poet Rabindranath Tagore visited the city multiple times and built a house that still exists. The historical book Rajmala contains incidents and historical stories of Agartala.

== Geography and climate ==
The city of Agartala is located in the plain region of Tripura with the river Haora flowing through the city which floods every year during the monsoon season.

Agartala has a monsoon influenced humid subtropical climate (Köppen Cwa) just short of being hot enough to qualify as a borderline tropical savanna (Aw)/tropical monsoon (Am) climate. Large amounts of rain fall all year except during the dry "winter" or "cool" season. The city experiences long, hot and wet summers, lasting from April to October. Average temperatures are around 28 °C or 82.4 °F, fluctuating with rainfall. There is a short, mild winter from mid-November to early March, with mostly dry conditions and average temperatures around 18 °C (64 °F). The best time to visit is from September to February. Summers are long and extremely hot with much sunlight and warm days. Rain is very common in this season and the city can be found flooded.

Climate data for Agartala (1991–2020 normals, extremes 1953–present)
| Month | Jan | Feb | Mar | Apr | May | Jun | Jul | Aug | Sep | Oct | Nov | Dec | Year |
|---|---|---|---|---|---|---|---|---|---|---|---|---|---|
| Record high °C (°F) | 32.2 (90.0) | 35.1 (95.2) | 38.9 (102.0) | 41.5 (106.7) | 42.2 (108.0) | 40.2 (104.4) | 37.7 (99.9) | 39.5 (103.1) | 37.6 (99.7) | 38.2 (100.8) | 34.8 (94.6) | 33.1 (91.6) | 42.2 (108.0) |
| Mean daily maximum °C (°F) | 24.9 (76.8) | 28.5 (83.3) | 32.2 (90.0) | 33.3 (91.9) | 33.1 (91.6) | 32.6 (90.7) | 32.1 (89.8) | 32.6 (90.7) | 32.5 (90.5) | 31.8 (89.2) | 29.8 (85.6) | 26.4 (79.5) | 30.8 (87.4) |
| Daily mean °C (°F) | 17.5 (63.5) | 21.1 (70.0) | 25.6 (78.1) | 27.9 (82.2) | 28.2 (82.8) | 28.4 (83.1) | 28.3 (82.9) | 28.6 (83.5) | 28.1 (82.6) | 27.0 (80.6) | 23.4 (74.1) | 19.1 (66.4) | 25.3 (77.5) |
| Mean daily minimum °C (°F) | 10.8 (51.4) | 14.3 (57.7) | 19.2 (66.6) | 22.5 (72.5) | 23.8 (74.8) | 25.5 (77.9) | 25.6 (78.1) | 25.6 (78.1) | 25.1 (77.2) | 23.1 (73.6) | 17.5 (63.5) | 13.0 (55.4) | 20.4 (68.7) |
| Record low °C (°F) | 3.3 (37.9) | 4.7 (40.5) | 9.4 (48.9) | 13.2 (55.8) | 16.1 (61.0) | 18.9 (66.0) | 21.2 (70.2) | 20.0 (68.0) | 20.0 (68.0) | 14.6 (58.3) | 9.2 (48.6) | 2.0 (35.6) | 2.0 (35.6) |
| Average precipitation mm (inches) | 6.2 (0.24) | 19.1 (0.75) | 60.8 (2.39) | 175.3 (6.90) | 391.6 (15.42) | 408.6 (16.09) | 359.0 (14.13) | 271.4 (10.69) | 212.7 (8.37) | 155.8 (6.13) | 34.5 (1.36) | 12.8 (0.50) | 2,108 (82.99) |
| Average rainy days | 0.6 | 1.6 | 2.8 | 7.6 | 13.8 | 15.3 | 15.9 | 14.7 | 11.4 | 7.1 | 1.2 | 0.5 | 92.5 |
| Average relative humidity (%) (at 17:30 IST) | 73 | 63 | 59 | 67 | 74 | 81 | 81 | 81 | 83 | 83 | 81 | 80 | 76 |
Source 1: India Meteorological Department
Source 2: Tokyo Climate Center (mean temperatures 1991–2020)

== Demographics ==
As of the 2011 Indian Census, Agartala had a total population of 400,004, of which 200,132 were males and 199,872 were females. The population within the age range of 0 to 6 year is 35,034. The total number of literates in Agartala was 344,711, which constituted 86.18% of the population with male literacy of 87.53% and female literacy of 84.82%. The effective literacy rate of 7+ population of Agartala was 94.5%, of which male literacy rate was 96.2% and female literacy rate was 92.8%. The sex ratio of Agartala is 999 females per 1,000 males. The Scheduled Castes and Scheduled Tribes are 77,663 and 19,767 respectively.

=== Languages ===
Languages spoken in Agartala city (2011)
1. Bengali (90.8%)
2. Tripuri (Kokborok) (4.05%)
3. Hindi (2.36%)
4. Manipuri (Meitei) (0.83%)
5. Others (1.92%)

In 1941 Agartala had a population of 17,693. By 1991 the population had risen to 157,358.

Bengali, the official state language, is the dominant language in Agartala spoken by 90.84% of the population, while English is also a popular language in the state; Kokborok, another official language, is spoken by 4.05% in the city. Hindi and Meitei are spoken by 2.36% and 0.83%, respectively.

=== Ethnicities ===
The city mainly consists of Bengalis and Tripuris. Bengali is widely spoken in the city as a result of the erstwhile regal patronage and high influx of Bengalis from Comilla, Sylhet, Noakhali, and Chittagong districts of Bangladesh. Durga Puja and Saraswati Puja are celebrated with great grandeur and ecstatic enthusiasm, which reflect the influence of the culture of the Bengalis. Hence, nearly every festivity attracts participation from citizens of diverse backgrounds.

There is also a growing population of Tripuri people in the city. Among the native Tripuri festivals, the most famous are Kharchi, Garia and Ker festivals and Tring. The major areas where the Tripuri live are in the localities of Abhoynagar, Banamalipur, Krishnanagar, Nandannagar and Kunjaban areas who have started to mass migrate to Agartala from other parts of Tripura.

There is also a sizeable population of Meitei as well as Hindi-speakers.

=== Religion ===
Religion in Agartala City (2011)
| Religion | Percent |
| Hinduism | 94.09% |
| Islam | 4.37% |
| Christianity | 0.99% |
| Buddhism | 0.28% |
| Others | 0.27% |
Others include Sikhs, Jains & other religions

According to the 2011 census, 94.09% of the population is Hindu, 4.37% Muslim, 0.99% Christian, and 0.28% Buddhist. The remainder of the population includes Sikhs, Jains, and other religions; 0.27%.

=== Population density ===
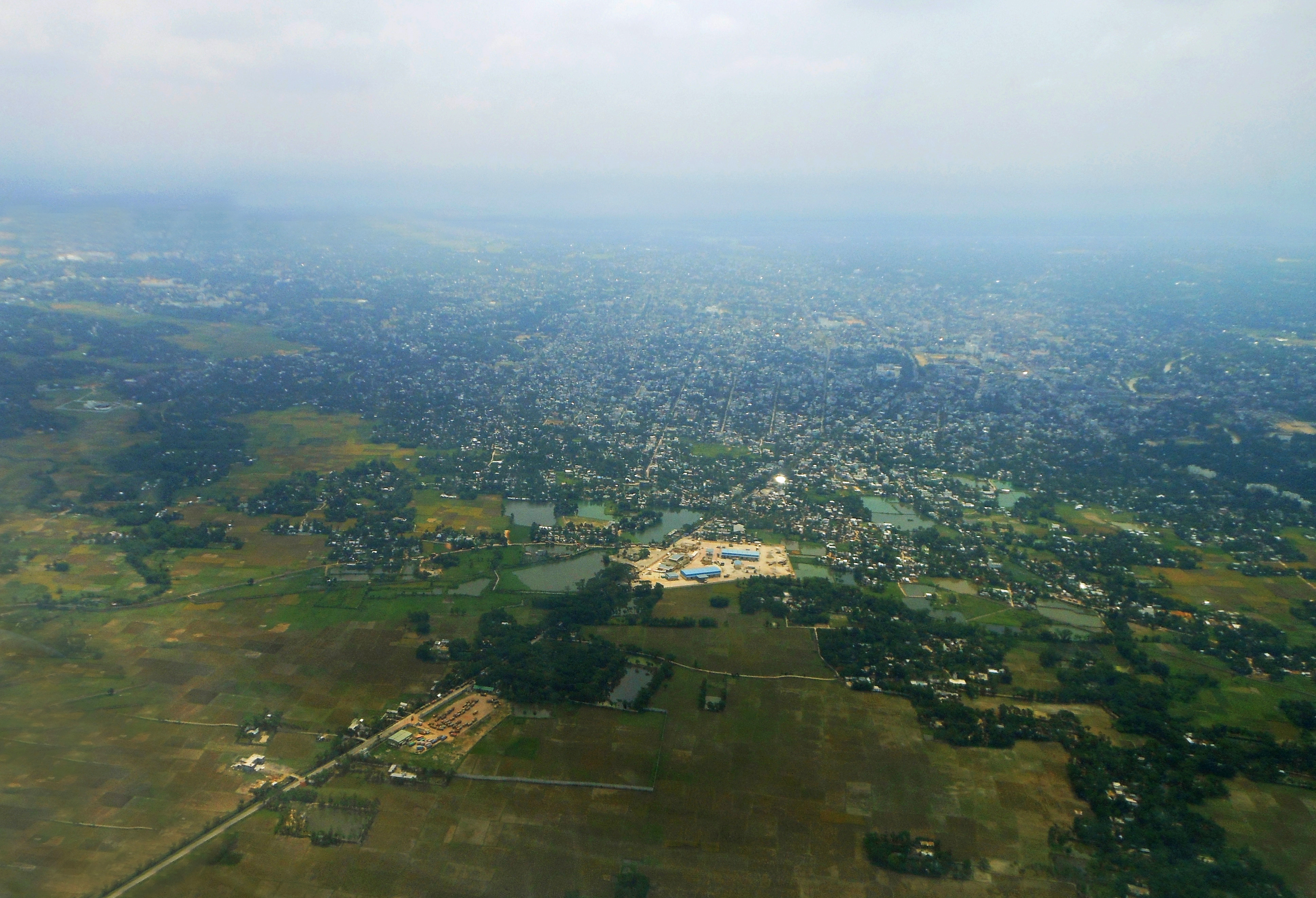
Aerial view of Agartala, mainly showing the parts of Ramnagar and the Integrated Check Post (ICP) (white landmark). Beyond that point is the Indo-Bangla border showing the territory of Bangladesh (paddy field).

| Year | Population | Area |
|---|---|---|
| 1901 | 6,415 | 3 square miles (8 km^{2}) |
| 1911 | 6,831 | 3 square miles (8 km^{2}) |
| 1921 | 7,743 | 3 square miles (8 km^{2}) |
| 1931 | 9,580 | 3 square miles (8 km^{2}) |
| 1941 | 17,693 | 3 square miles (8 km^{2}) |
| 1951 | 42,595 | 3 square miles (8 km^{2}) |
| 1961 | 54,878 | 3 square miles (8 km^{2}) |
| 1971 | 100,264 | 3 square miles (8 km^{2}) |
| 1981 | 132,186 | 10.94 km^{2} |
| 1991 | 157,358 | 15.81 km^{2} |
| 2001 | 188,540 | 16.02 km^{2} |
| 2004 | 367,822 | 58.84 km^{2} |
| 2011 | 404,004 | 58.84 km^{2} |
| 2013 | 438,408 | 76.504 km^{2} (Greater Agartala Planning Area: 512,264 and 92 km^{2}) |

Agartala has emerged as one of the fastest-growing cities in the north-eastern region of India today. The city area under the AMC has seen a consistent expansion in recent times with conglomeration of various industries and businesses shaping up. Poverty and literacy still remains a challenge for the governing bodies.

== Government and politics ==
=== City administration ===
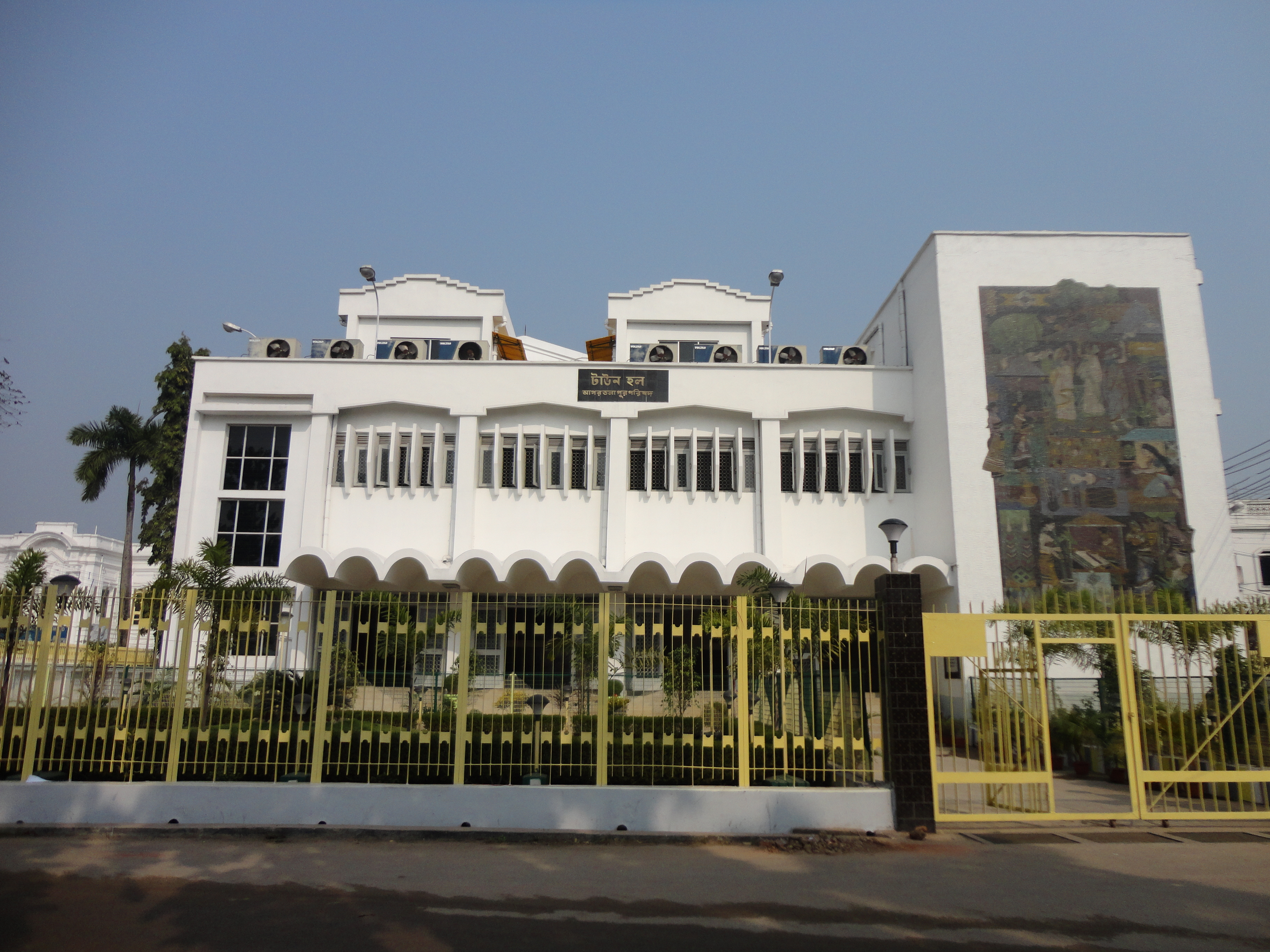
Agartala Town Hall

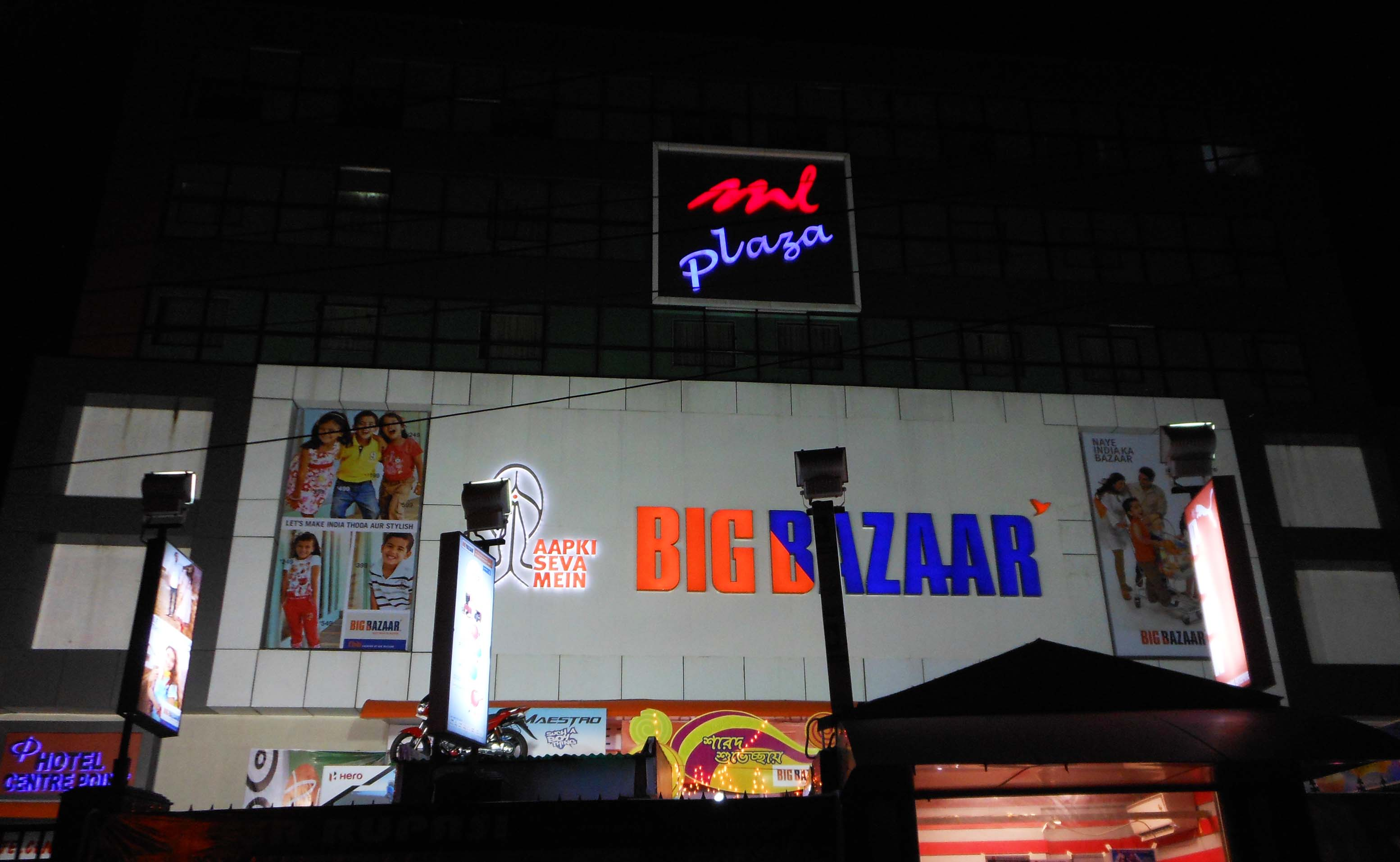
Big Bazaar, ML Plaza

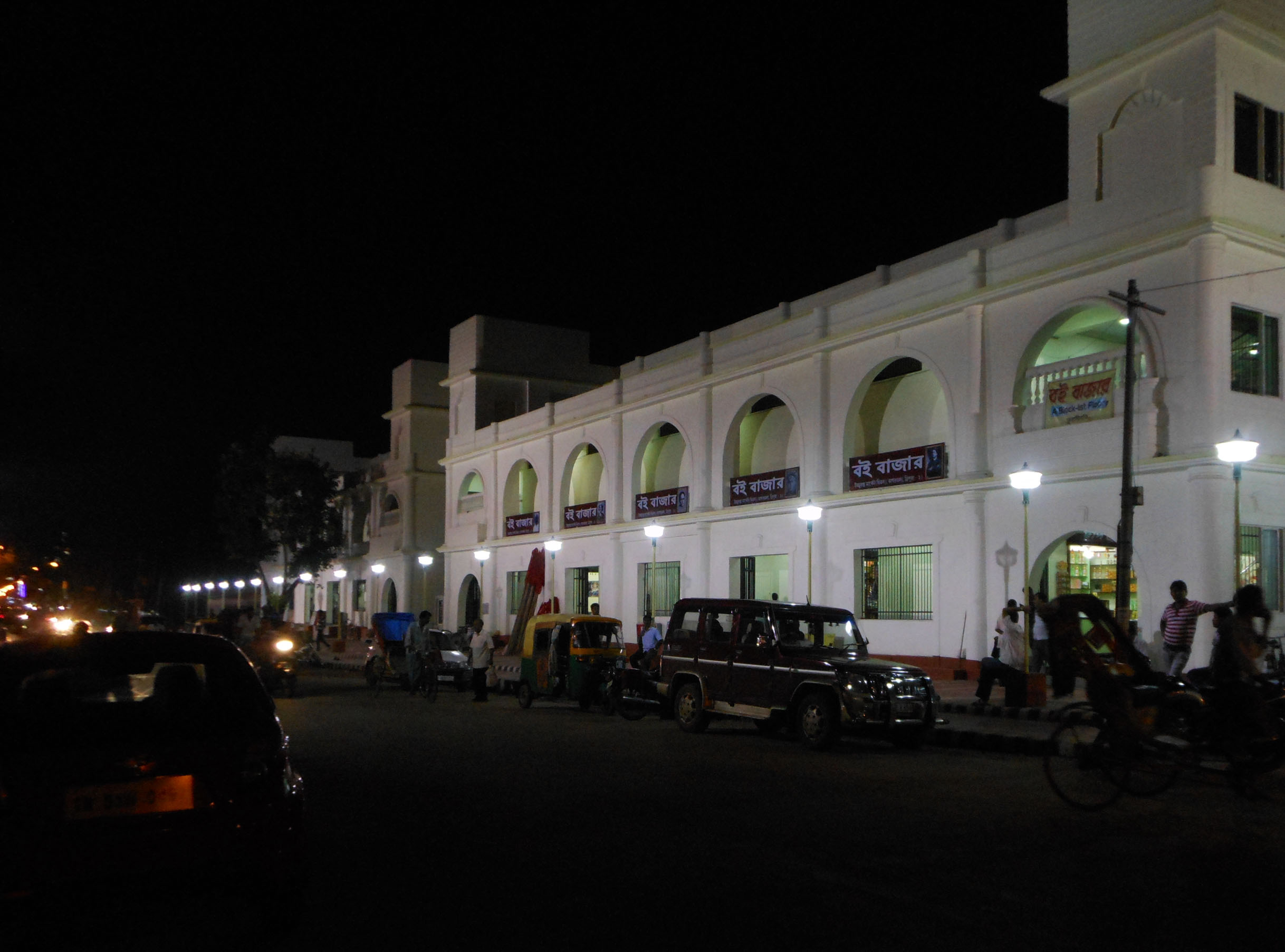
Ujjayanta Market used to be known as Indira Book market and Tulsibati Market.

The city is managed by the Agartala Municipal Corporation (AMC), which divides the city into 49 municipal wards under four zones: North, South, East and Central zones. Each ward has an elected ward representative or municipal councillor. For postal administration the city is divided into postal zones. Agartala Municipality became a Municipal Corporation on January 21, 2014, which is the day when Agartala attained statehood in 1972.

From 2004 the Agartala Municipal Council has been further extended, taking 16 villages of Dukli R. D. Block, seven villages of Mohanpur R. D. Block and two villages of Jirania R. D. Block with area of 43 km^{2} and 178,495 population in addition to the 16 km^{2} and population of 200,000 in the 2001 census.

Agartala city consists of many paras, which means "locality" in Bengali. Each collection of neighbourhoods or para is usually also a municipal ward or division. The complete list of municipal wards and their locations by municipal zones are shown in the table below.

| Ward no. | Para / locality | Municipal zone |
|---|---|---|
| 1 | Barjala | North |
| 2 | Chandinamura-Lichubagan | North |
| 3 | Kunjaban | North |
| 4 | Chanmari | North |
| 5 | Indranagar | North |
| 6 | Nandannagar | North |
| 7 | Abhoynagar | North |
| 8 | Radhanagar | North |
| 9 | Ranjitnagar | Central |
| 10 | Rajnagar | Central |
| 11 | Paschim Jaynagar | Central |
| 12 | Ramnagar | Central |
| 13 | Paschim Krishnanagar | Central |
| 14 | Krishnanagar | Central |
| 15 | Dimsagar-Banamalipur | Central |
| 16 | Dhaleswar | East |
| 17 | Kashipur-Khayerpur | East |
| 18 | Shibnagar | East |
| 19 | Paschim Shibnagar | East |
| 20 | Town Pratapgarh | Central |
| 21 | Shantipara | Central |
| 22 | Melarmath | Central |
| 23 | Bardowali | South |
| 24 | Bhattapukur-Badarghat | South |
| 25 | Arundhutinagar | South |
| 26 | Dakkhin Badarghat | South |
| 27 | Siddhi Ashram | South |
| 28 | Rajlaxminagar | South |
| 29 | Arundhutinagar | South |
| 30 | Paschim Pratapgarh | South |
| 31 | Purba Pratapgarh | South |
| 32 | Jogendranagar | East |
| 33 | Uttar Jogendranagar | East |
| 34 | Aralia | East |
| 35 | Purba Jogendranagar | East |

=== Politics ===
On 1 November 1956, Tripura became a Union Territory and an Advisory Committee was formed to advise the Chief Commissioner. On 15 August 1957, a Territorial Council was formed with 30 elected members and two members nominated by the government of India. On 1 July 1963, the Tripura Territorial Council was dissolved and a Legislative Assembly with the existing members of the Territorial Council was formed. Tripura is governed through a parliamentary system of representative democracy, a feature it shares with other Indian states. Universal suffrage is granted to residents. The Tripura government has three branches: executive, legislature and judiciary. The Tripura Legislative Assembly consists of elected members and special office bearers that are elected by the members. Assembly meetings are presided over by the speaker, or by the deputy speaker in the case of the speaker's absence. The Assembly is unicameral with 60 members of the Legislative Assembly (MLA). Agartala assembly constituency is part of Tripura West. Political clashes between the Communist Party of India (Marxist) and Indian National Congress were common until 2018. Now Bharatiya Janata Party is the main Party in the state.

After the independence of India in 1947 Tripura was still a princely state. After the death of the last king Maharaja Bir Bikram Kishore Manikya Bahadur on 17 May 1947, a Regency Council was formed headed by Maharani Kanchan Prava Devi, for aid of the minor Prince, Kirit Bikram Kishore Manikya Bahadur. The regent signed the merger agreement with the government of India. After the merger Tripura became a Part 'C' state. On reorganisation of the states, effected in November 1956, Tripura became a Union Territory with an Advisory Committee to aid and advise the chief commissioner. Tripura gained its statehood on 21 January 1972 before that but merging with India in 1949 the first chief minister of the state was on 1 July 1963, Sachindra Lal Singh of the Indian National Congress, he was the CM of the state for around 3,046 days. From 5 January 1978 the rule of the Congress came to an end as Nripen Chakraborty became the first communist chief minister of Tripura. Later again the communists fell and the INC rose and was in power till 1992, from 1993 again CPI (M) came to power. Manik Sarkar was the CM of the state from 11 March 1998 to March 2018. In 2018 Tripura Legislative Assembly election BJP won 36 out of 59 seats, defeating CPI(M) in the process. BJP's Biplab Kumar Deb was sworn in as the chief minister of Tripura. In 2023 Tripura Legislative Assembly election BJP won another majority and the government was re-elected. Manik Saha was sworn in as the Chief Minister of Tripua.

Agartala is administered by several government agencies. The Agartala Municipal Corporation, or AMC, oversees and manages the civic infrastructure of the city which together encompass 49 wards. Each ward elects a councillor to the AMC. Each borough has a committee of councillors, each of whom is elected to represent a ward. By means of the borough committees, the corporation undertakes urban planning and maintains roads, government-aided schools, hospitals, and municipal markets.

== Economy ==
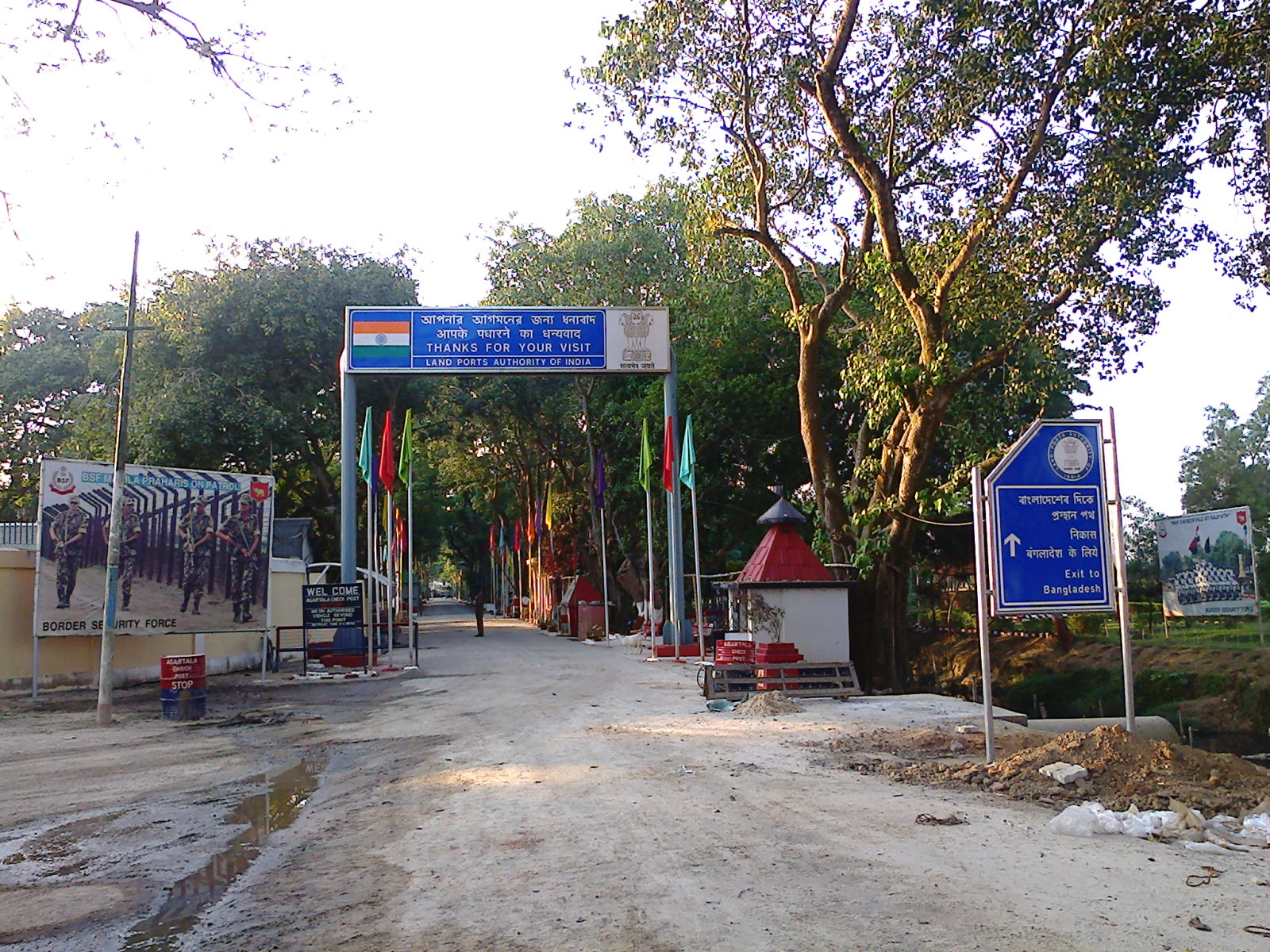
Integrated Border Check Post at Akhaura

Most of the population is employed in the state and central government, and other government owned enterprises.

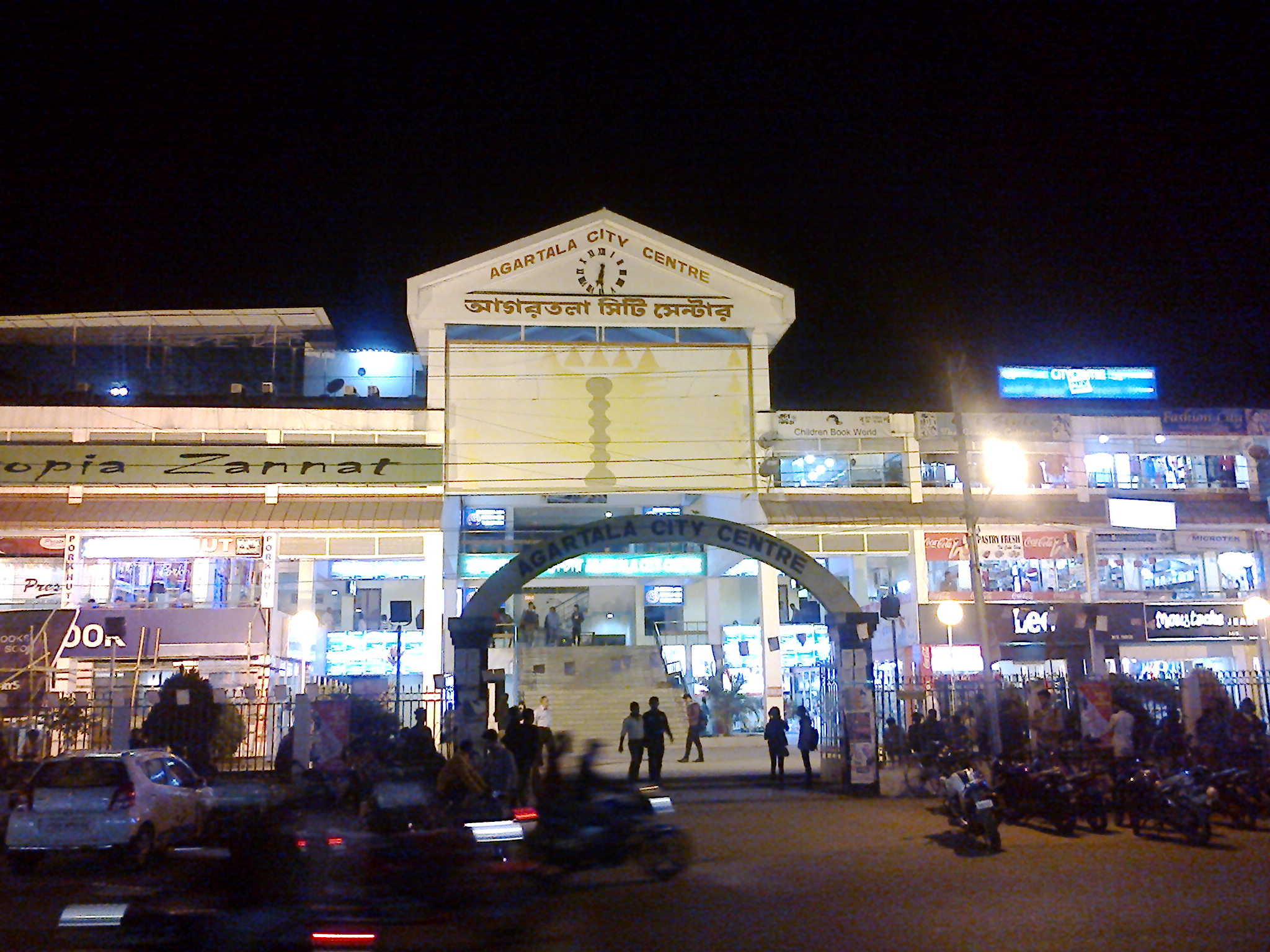
Agartala City Centre

The consumption patterns of the residents of Agartala have evolved considerably since the expansion of the city and the corresponding rise in population; previously, major consumption took place once a year, during Durga puja, while during the rest of the year consumption took place largely only for special occasions.

The Agartala Book Fair has been held annually, usually in Agartala, since 1981.

== Culture ==
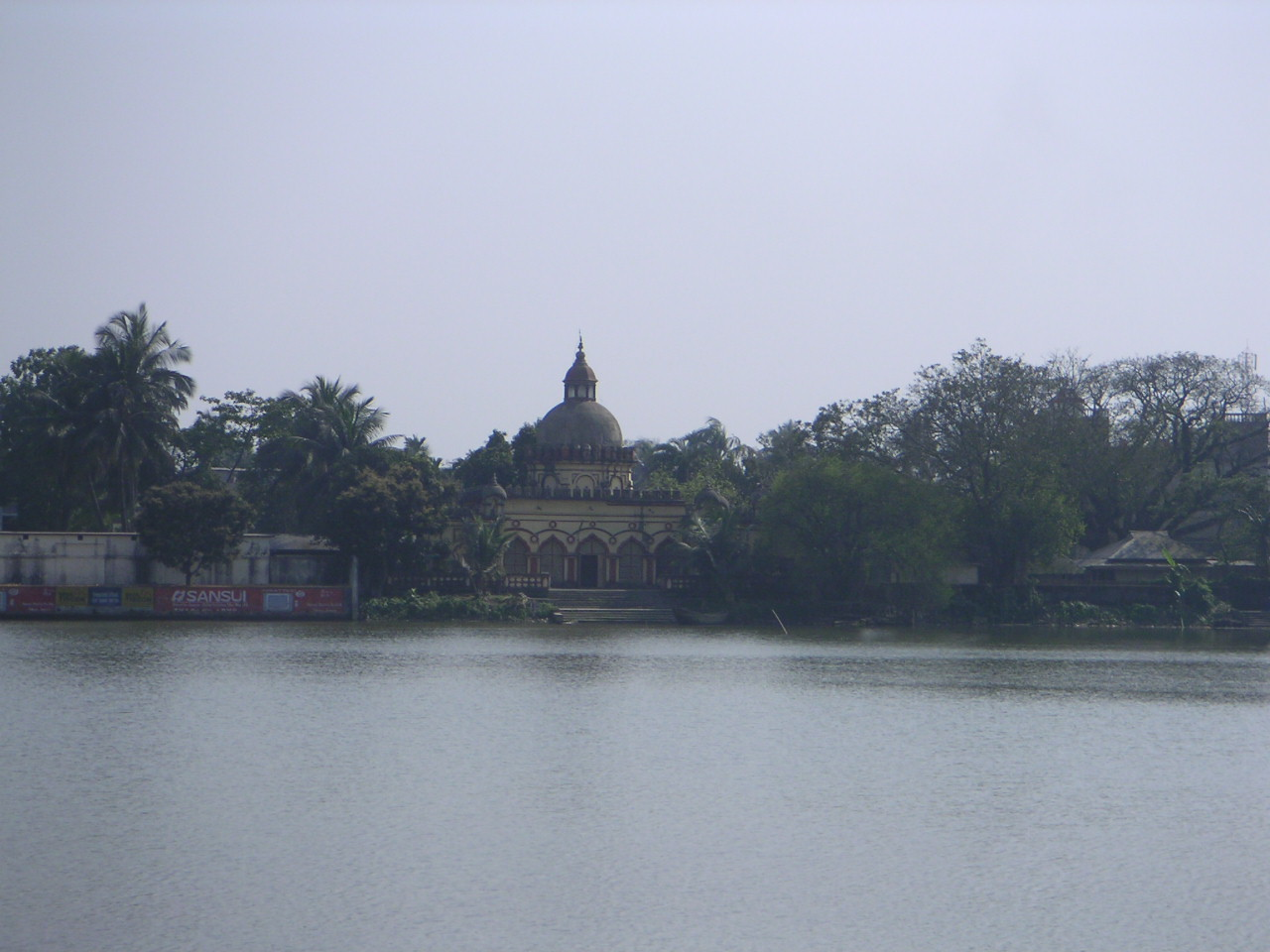
Laxmi Narayan Bari temple in the Palace Compound

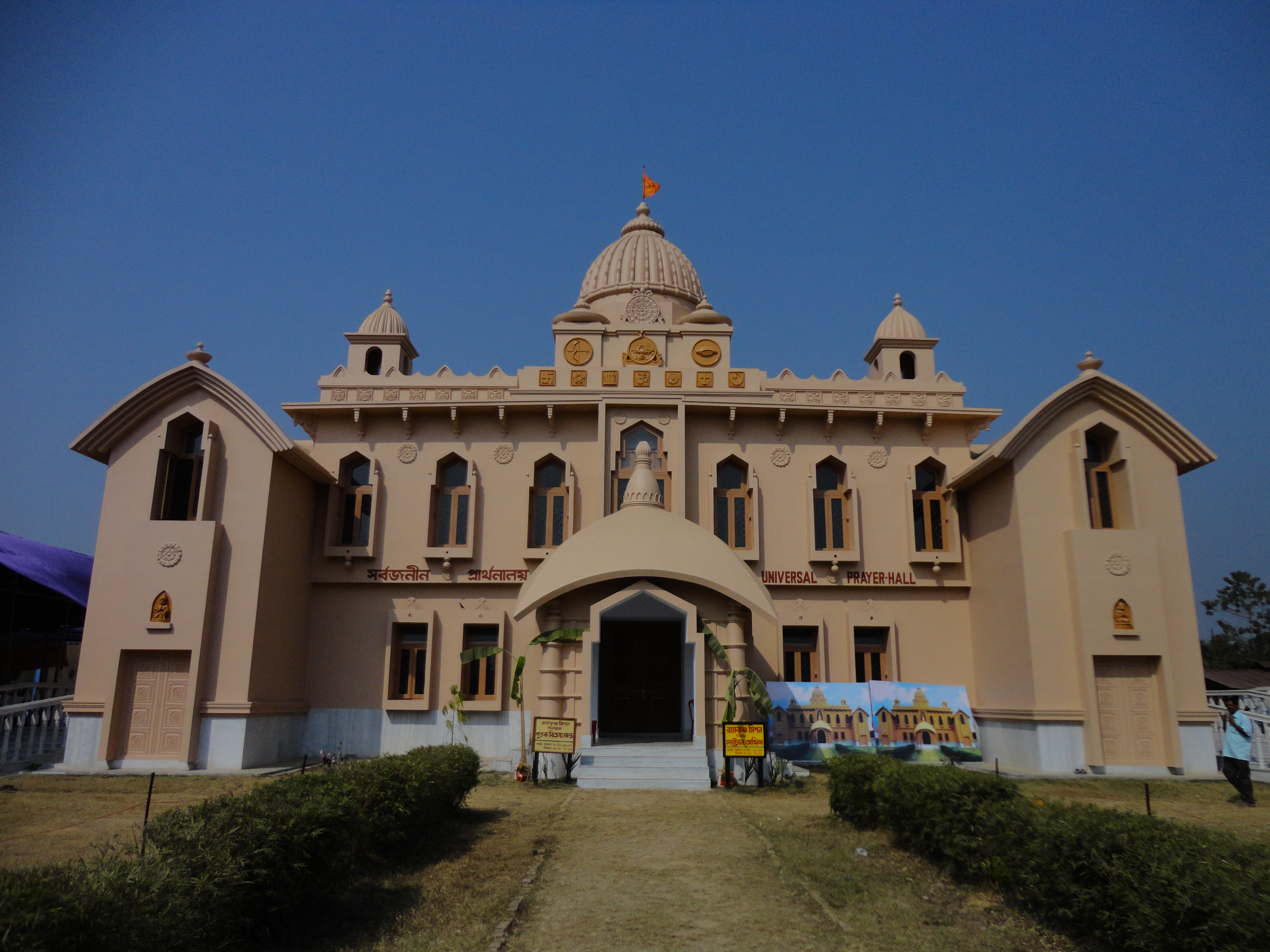
Universal Prayer Hall, Ramakrishna Mission, Agartala

Like in other Indian states, there is mixed religion in Agartala. Hinduism is the dominant religion and there are many temples across the city. The whole city is nestled with tents catering to a variety of themes. Christianity is a widespread faith as well, with Christmas being a very busy time of the year. Agartala is also known for its Tripuri festivals like Kharchi, and Garia Ter.

=== Temples ===
Some prominent temples are:

- Lakshmi Narayan Temple, the Palace Compound
- Agartala Jagannath Mandir

=== Churches ===
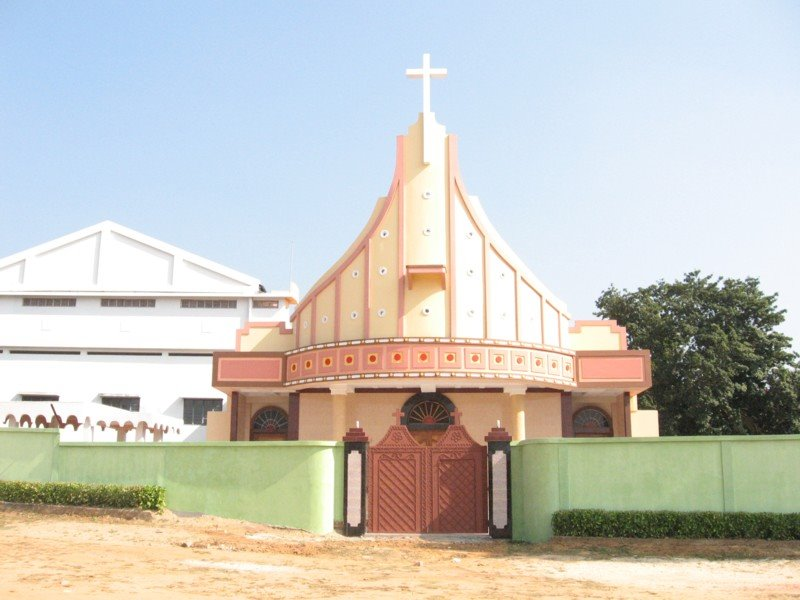
Catholic Church of Nandangagar parish, Don Bosco

- Union Baptist Church, Arundhutinagar, the oldest church in Agartala
- Agartala City Baptist Church, Supari Bagan
- St. Francis Xavier Cathedral Church, Durjoynagar

== Transportation ==
=== Airport ===
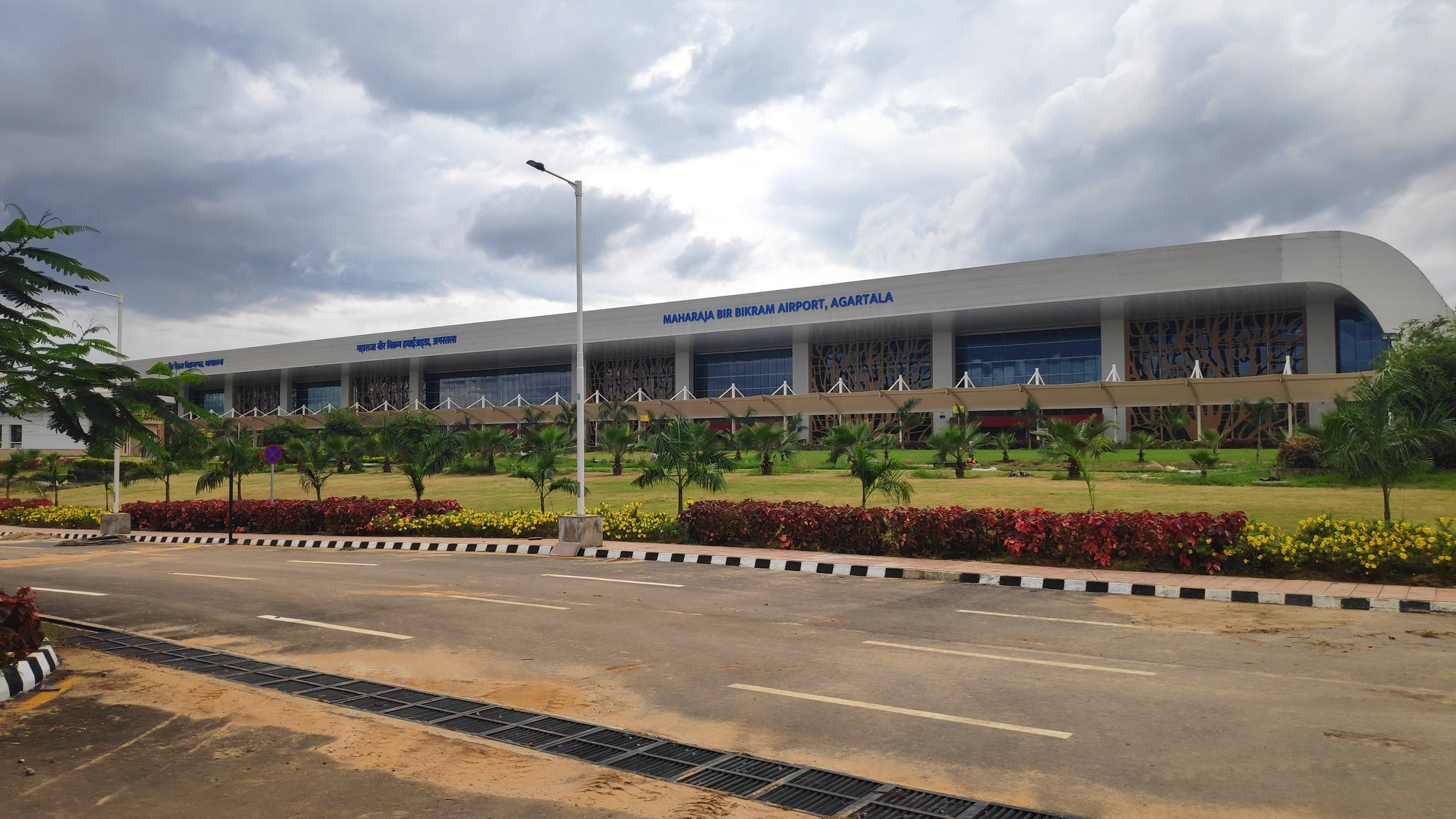
Maharaja Bir Bikram Airport Terminal

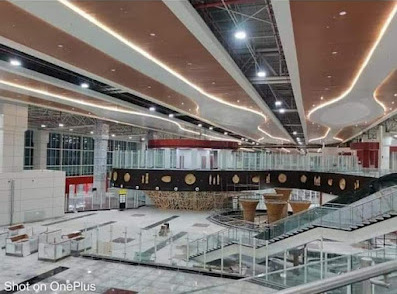
Interior of airport

Agartala is connected to other cities in India by air via Maharaja Bir Bikram Airport. There are direct flight connections to Kolkata, Imphal, Guwahati, Bangalore and New Delhi. As per AAI report, Agartala airport is the third international airport in northeast India. The airport was built in 1942 by Bir Bikram Kishore Manikya Debbarma Bahadur who was the ruler of Tripura State until 1947, and used to be called "Singerbhil Airport"; the Indian Ministry of Civil Aviation renamed the airport in 2018. During World War II, US 4th Combat Cargo Group flew Curtiss C-46 from the airport to fly supplies over Burma. The airport is located in Singerbhil 20 km (12 mi) north of Agartala. The major airlines are Air India, IndiGo. The airport is under construction to make it an international airport.

Plans passed to upgrade the airport building with a new terminal under construction and better facilities and modern equipment along with more apron, expansion of runways, better CAT and navigation system.

=== Roads ===
National Highway 8 connects Agartala to Assam and the rest of India by road, also known as the lifeline of Tripura. The highways (NH44, NH 44A) connect Agartala with Silchar (317 km), Guwahati (599 km), Shillong (499 km), Dharmanagar (200 km) and Aizawl (443 km). A bus service connects it to Dhaka (150 km).

- National Highway 8 (India) – connected to Tripura to Shillong and Mizoram (NH 108)
- National Highway 108 (India) – connected to Tripura to Mizoram

Agartala is well connected by road to other parts of Tripura state. National Highway 8 has been extended to the south, thus improving the road connectivity between Agartala and south Tripura. Buses, Jeeps, Trekkers and SUVs are the most common public carriers, and cars and vans are usually used for private hire. The highway passes through hilly terrains, while travelling from the city towards the North one can experience the lavishing and lush green Baramura Hill Range, Atharamura Hills and the Longtharai Hills and while moving towards the South Debatamura Hills can be seen.

The main mode of public transportation within the city consists of a network of cycle rickshaws, auto rickshaws and buses. To ease traffic congestion a 2.26 km long flyover is constructed.

=== Railways ===
Since 2008, Agartala has been connected to other cities in India by the Agartala Railway Station situated at Dukli. The foundation stone for the 119-km Kumarghat-Agartala railway project was laid in 1996 by former prime minister H. D. Deve Gowda.

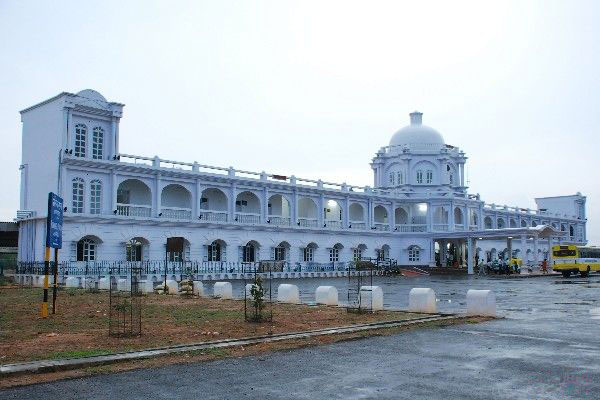
Agartala railway station

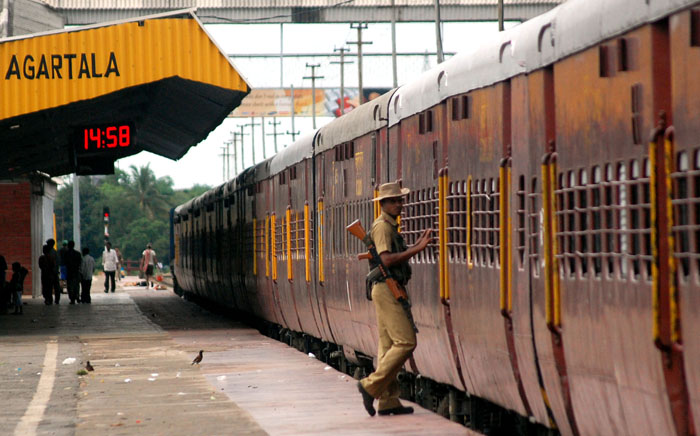
A passenger train at Agartala railway station

Agartala is the second capital city (after Guwahati, Assam) in the northeast which is connected to the country's railway network. The railway station is located approximately 5.5 km (2.96 nautical miles) from the heart of the city and a lot of modes of transportation are available to reach the city from the station.

Broad-gauge conversion work in the Lumding-Silchar segment was completed in March 2015. Gauge conversion work up to Agartala was completed by the end of March 2016, and railway traffic between Agartala and Silchar began. During the laying of rail lines from Kumarghat to Agartala, provisions were kept for swiftly converting it to broad gauge. Presently, local trains from Agartala to Dharmanagar and Silchar are functional. Work on express trains connecting Agartala to Delhi, Kolkata, Guwahati and Dibrugarh has started. Local railway traffic between Agartala to Sabroom has become functional.

Connecting with Tripura Train Rajdhani, Shatabdi, Janshatabdi, Garib Rath, Duronto, Yuva, AC Trains. A rail link between Agartala and Akhaura in Bangladesh was approved by the government of India in September 2011. IRCON is constructing this 15 km long track that will directly connect northeast India to Chittagong international sea port. The TripuraSundari Express and Rajdhani Express are two Super Fast weekly trains connecting Agartala to Anand Vihar Terminal, Delhi. Other trains like Deoghar express (weekly), Kanchanjungha Express to Sealdah runs four days a week, Agartala-Habibganj weekly special train and Bengaluru bound Bi-weekly Humsafar Express connects the city to the states of Assam, West Bengal, Bihar, Jharkhand, Madhya Pradesh, Uttar Pradesh, Odisha, Andhra Pradesh, Tamil Nadu and Karnataka.

== Communications ==
=== Radio stations ===
- AIR
- Big FM
- Red FM 93.5

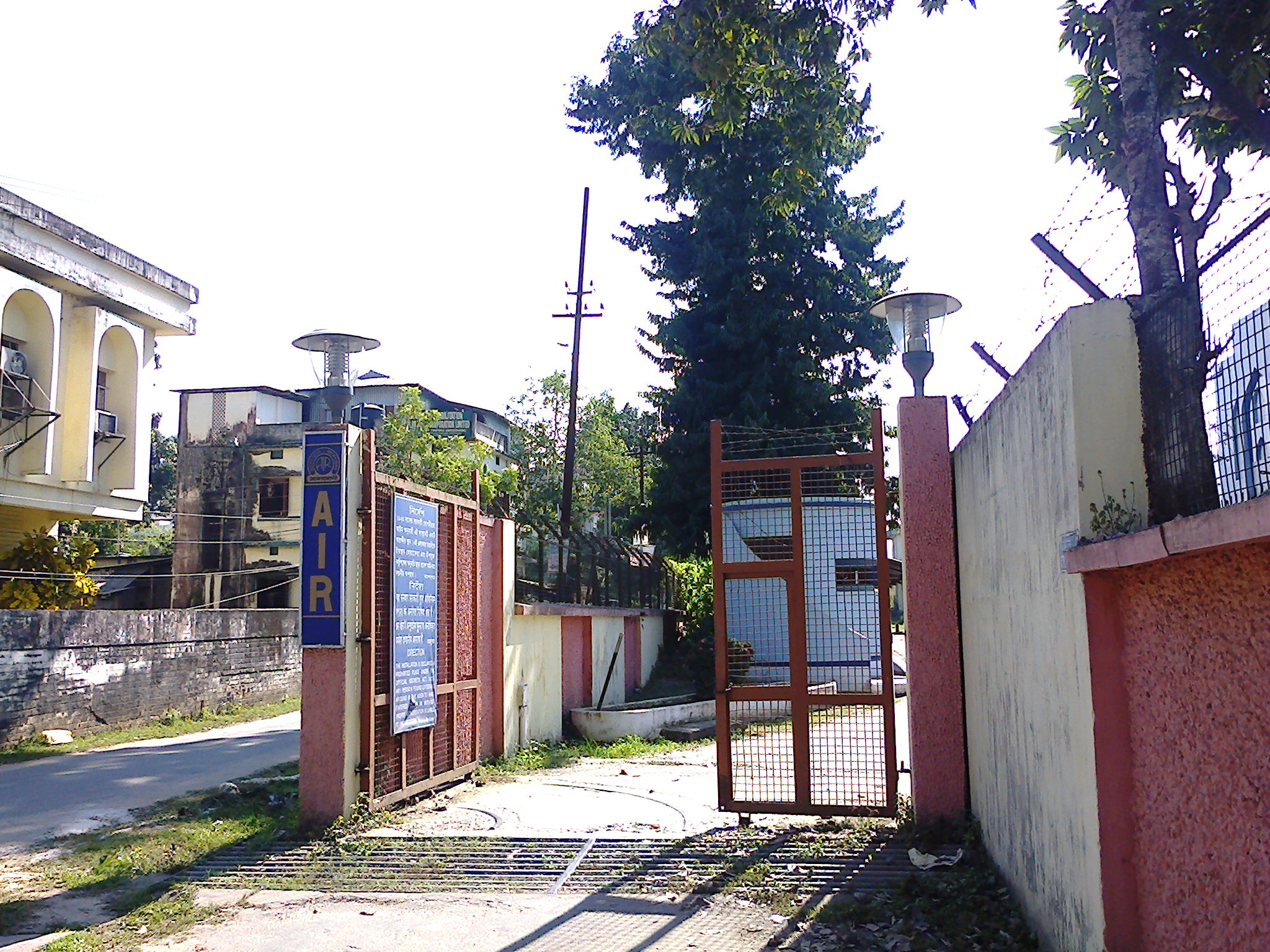
All India Radio, Agartala Station

=== Television ===
Doordarshan (DD) has a television station in Agartala. Akash Tripura is one of the first television channels in Agartala. It is a full-time Agartala-based news channel. Other full-time based channels are PB 24, Headlines Tripura, Akash Tripura, News Vanguard and Focus Tripura etc.

There are other cable channels such as – Hallabol, Sristi Tripura, Sristi Music, Sristi Bangla, Sristi Cinema, CITI, News All India, and Tripura Pratidin, which are not 24 hours channels and are run by Siti and Sristi Cable networks.

There are also KokBorok channels like KokTripura, KhumpuiTV and ChiniKhorangTV Which are currently in service.

=== Newspapers ===
Bengali-language media is dominant in the city. Major news publications are:

- Dainik Sambad (Bengali)
- Syandhan Patrika (Bengali)
- Ajker Fariad (Bengali)
- Bartaman (Bengali)
- Daily Desher Katha (Bengali)
- Aajkaal (Bengali)'
- Pratibadi Kalam (Bengali)
- Hachukni Kok (Kokborok)
- The Tripura Times (English)
- "Jagron" (Bengali)
- "Tripura oberserver" (English)

== Education ==
=== Universities ===
ICFAI University, Tripura

Tripura University is Agartala's central university, located in a 10 km range from the city of Agartala. Other universities include the ICFAI University, which was established in 2004 and is ranked 2nd in the Engineering Colleges of India. The Maharaja Bir Bikram University is known as the only state university within Tripura. The Sikkim Manipal University has been ranked 13th in India's best medical universities by India Today as well as being in the top 10 emerging colleges of India.

=== Colleges ===
There are currently 15 general colleges within Agartala including the Bir Bikram Memorial College, the Ramthakur College and the Women's College, Agartala which was established in 1965 and is the only existing college for women within the capital city.

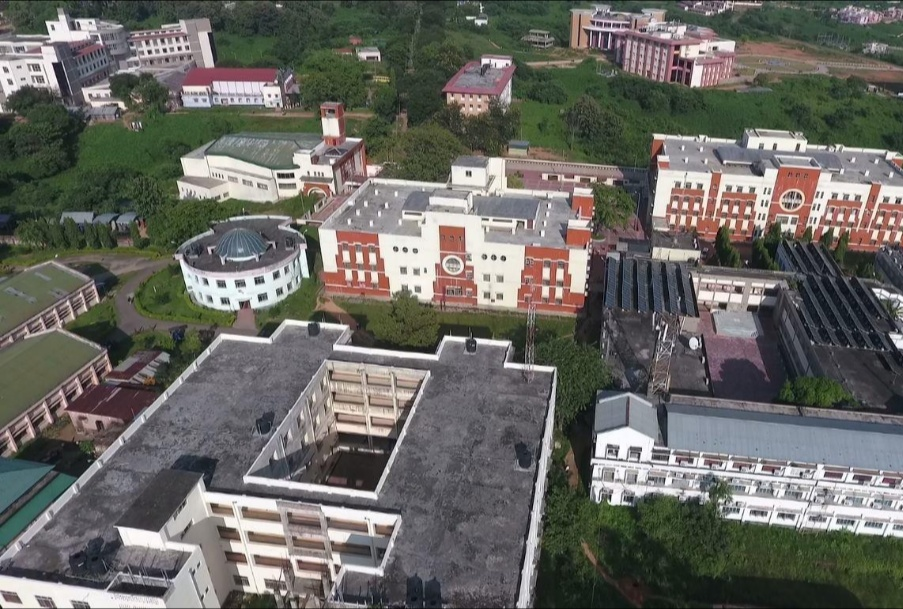
Aerial View of National Institute of Technology, Agartala

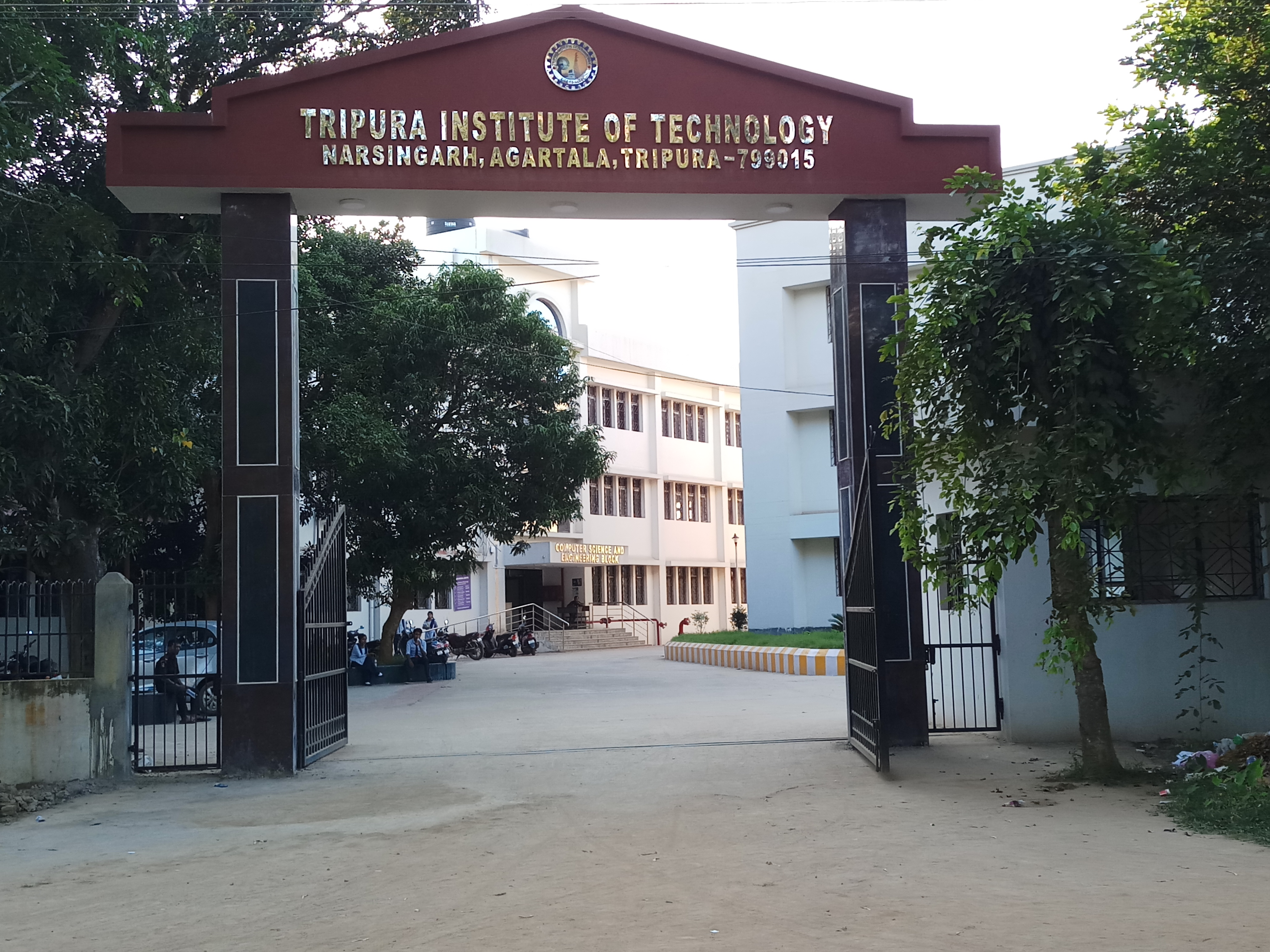
The entrance gate to the new campus of Tripura Institute of Technology

Colleges with a specific academic focus within Agartala include the Tripura Government Law College which provides a five-year Bachelor of Law Degree for its students. Agartala is also home to numerous technical colleges including the National Institute of Technology, Agartala, the Tripura Institute of Technology and the Indian Institute of Information Technology, Agartala.

=== Prominent schools ===
The prominent primary and secondary schools of Agartala include the St Paul's School, Agartala which has an aim to teach students who are a part of the Christian faith. A similar school, the Holy Cross School, was established by the Congregation of Holy Cross. Other prominent schools include the Shishu Bihar H.S. School,Netaji Subhash Vidyaniketan, Umakanta Academy English Medium School

== Sports ==
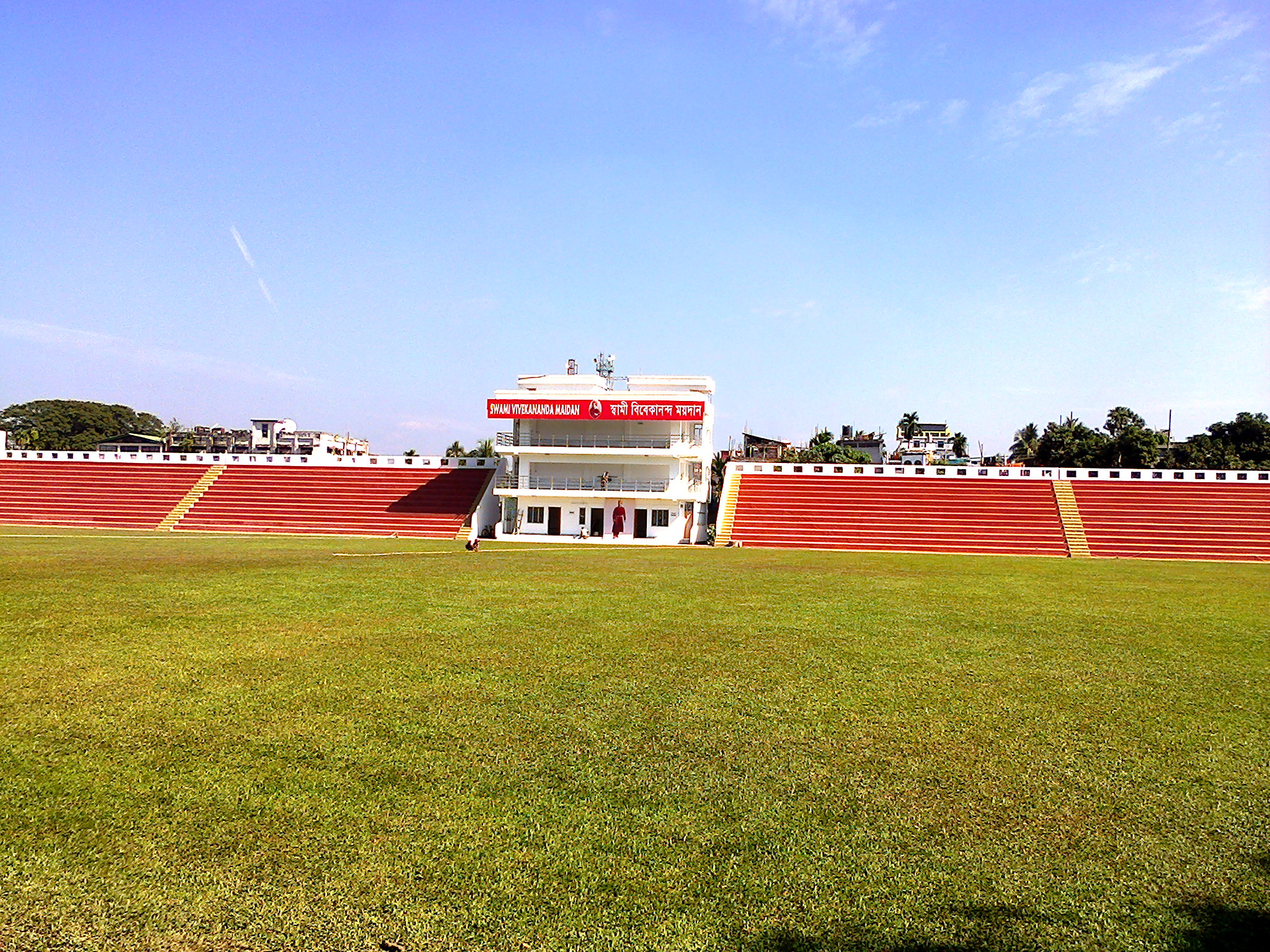
Swami Vivekananda Maidan, Agartala

Tripura is an important state in the northeast India with regard to sports. Cricket is the most important sport in the state. Football also has an important role.

=== Football ===
Agartala has a large base of football followers. UK mini stadium is an important venue for this game. Tripura Football Association organises a football league known as Agartala League every year to popularise the sport in the state.

=== Cricket ===
Tripura has a state team which plays under the auspices of the Tripura Cricket Association in the Eastern division of the Ranji Trophy championship, the national first-class cricket competition of India. The most important cricket grounds are Maharaja Bir Bikram College Stadium and Polytechnic Institute Ground, Narsingarh. Some other notable grounds are Astabal ground and the Pragati School cricket ground. Tripura Cricket Association organises cricket tournaments at the U-13, U-15, U-17 and U-19 levels where clubs affiliated to Tripura Cricket Association compete against each other.

=== Stadiums ===
The following are the stadiums in Agartala:

- Maharaja Bir Bikram College Stadium – the premier cricket stadium in the city with a capacity of 30,000 persons.
- Polytechnic Institute Ground- the second cricket stadium in the city with capacity of 15,000 persons.
- Swami Vivekananda Stadium – another multi-purpose stadium in the capital city of Tripura in Agartala. Located around 2 km away from the city centre, the stadium has a sitting capacity around 8000 including a grand stand and press gallery. The area of the inner ground is 7350 sqm. It is considered the most highly modernised and the best stadium in northeast India.

== Tourism ==
=== Places of interest ===
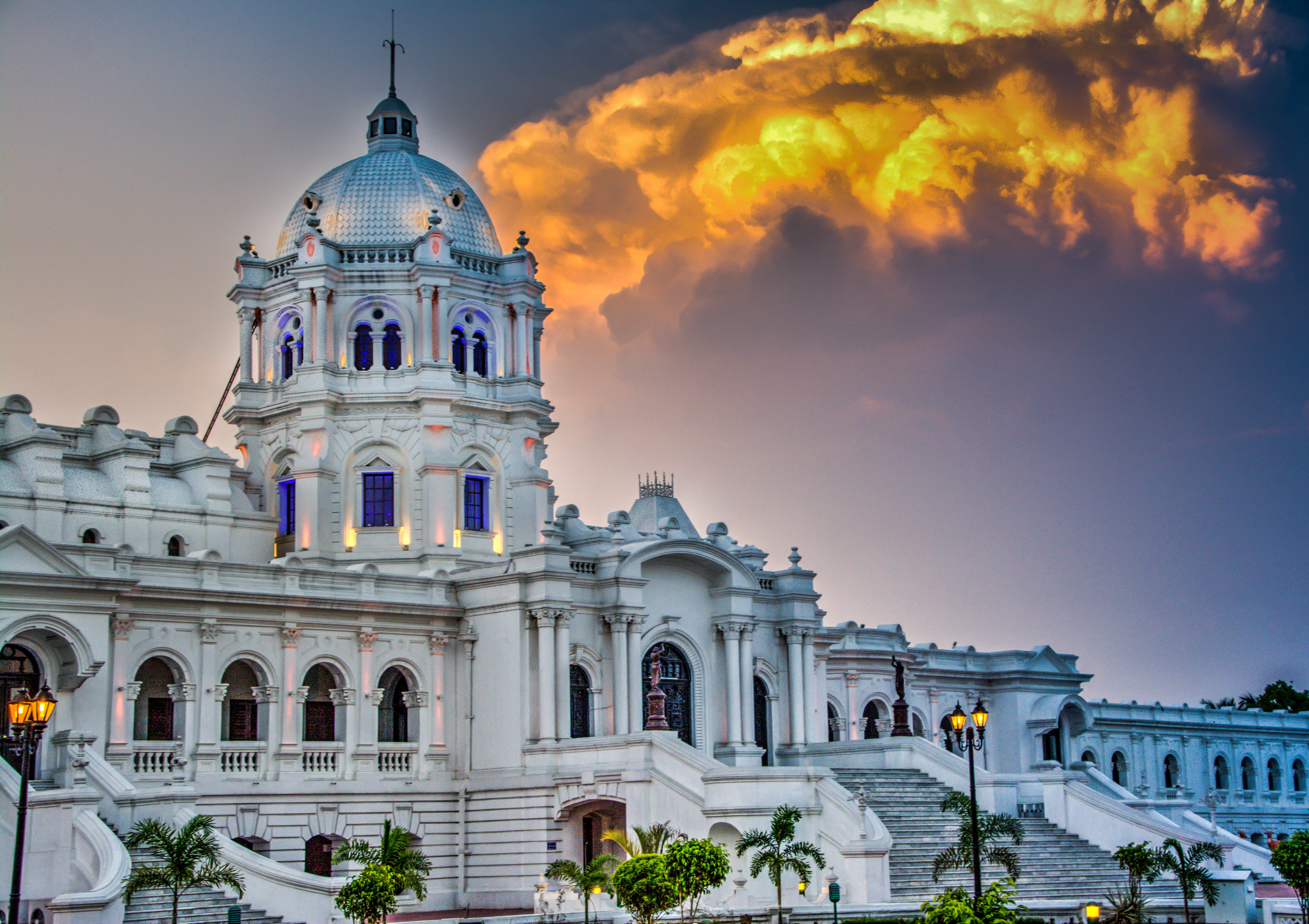
Ujjayanta Palace

- College Tilla – Maharaja Bir Bikram College, Tripura University buildings, football ground, international cricket stadium, picturesque lush landscapes and serene natural lakes. It is also a national bird sanctuary.
- Ujjayanta Palace – Palace of the Tripura kings also known as Nuyungma in Kokborok, was converted to state legislative assembly and now into a museum, situated in the area of Palace Compound. It is a former royal palace in Agartala, and also served as the meeting place of the Tripura Legislative Assembly until 2011. The name Ujjayanta Palace was given by the poet Rabindranath Tagore, who visited the state of Tripura many times. Maharaja Bir Bikram Manikya was the last king of Tripura and the last king who resided in the Ujjayanta Palace. It has now been transformed into a museum named Ujjayanta Museum and it was inaugurated by Dr.Hamid Ansari, the former vice-president of India
- Agartala Jagannath Mandir — Hindu temple of the Vaishnava school of thought.

=== Parks and playgrounds ===
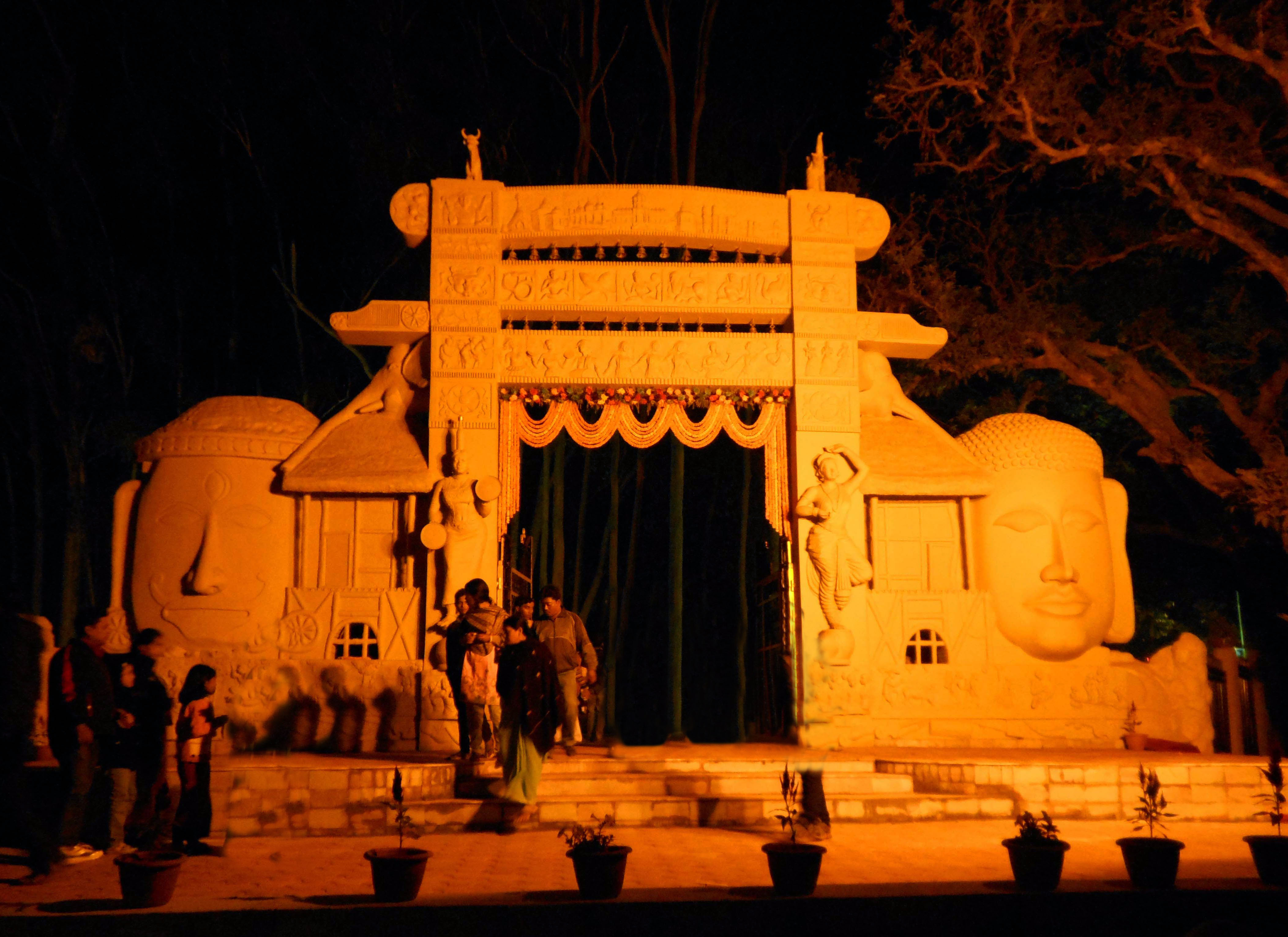
Main gate of Heritage Park

- Heritage Park: The most visited of all the parks in the city, the most notable features here are the miniature models of various monuments of the state, the Ayurvedic herb-garden and the fountain.
- Rabindra Kanan: A park in the vicinity of the Pushpavanta Palace, former Raj Bhavan of Tripura and the Malancha Nivas, this park annually holds the birth anniversary ceremony of Rabindranath Tagore, after whom the park is named. It is near to Heritage Park.
- Vivek Uddyan: Adjacent to Ujjayanta Palace and Children's Park, this park annually holds the birth anniversary ceremony of Swami Vivekananda, after whom the park is named
- Nehru Park: A stroll or walking park that is decorated in greenery with rivers (no mechanical themed-machinery), close in driving distance from Heritage Park and Rabindra kanan.
- Children's Park
- Albert Ekka Park
- Lembucherra Park: The latest addition to Agartala's parks

=== Museums ===
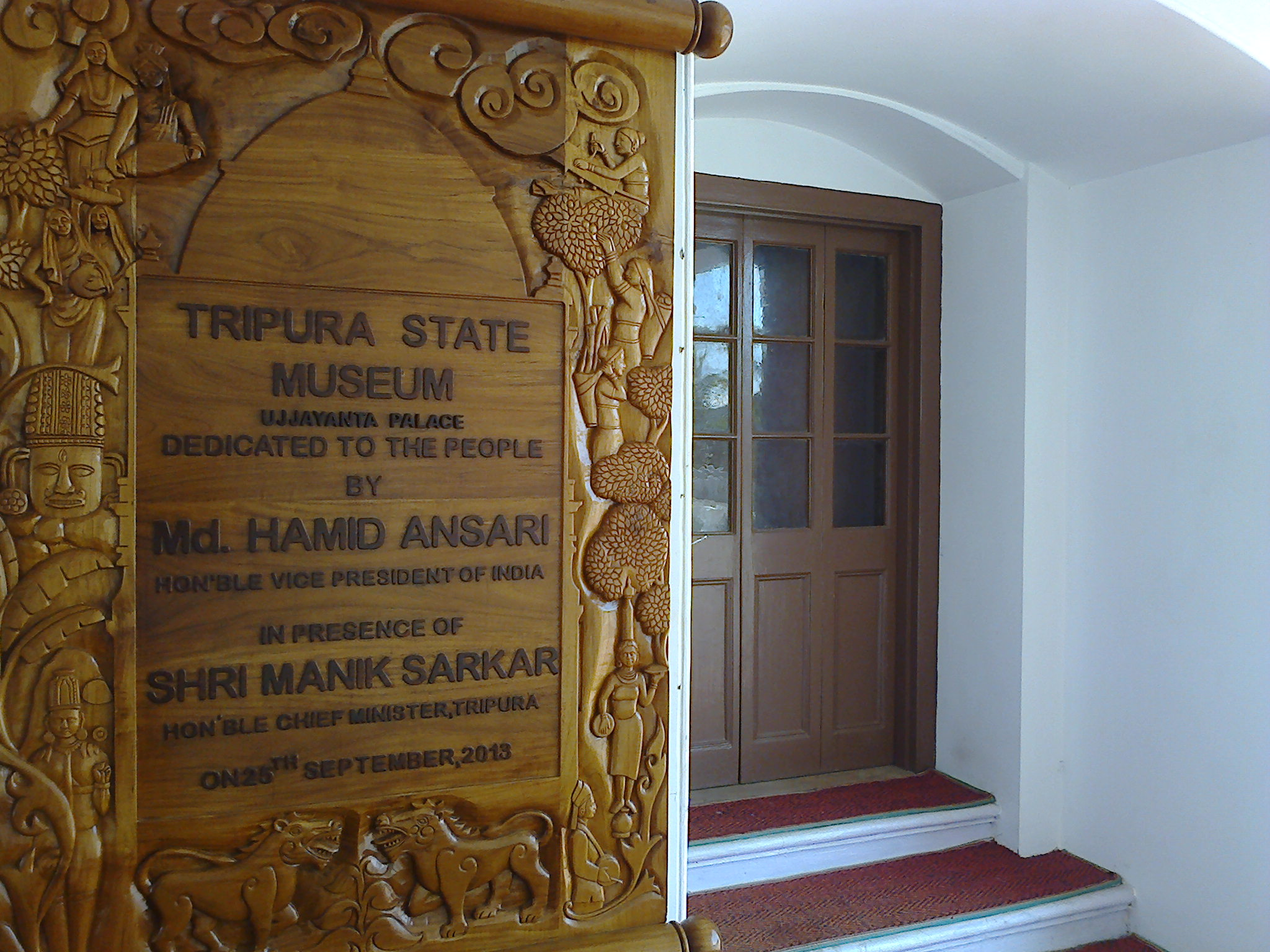
Tripura State Museum

- Tripura State Museum, located at the Ujjayanta Palace
- Science Museum, located in Sukanta Academy
- Haveli Museum, located in Khayerpur

=== Multiplexes ===
- Rupasi Multiplex: One of the established multi-screen cinemas in Agartala is the Rupasi Cinema, ML Plaza, Agartala.
- Balaka Cinema: Located in the City Center Agartala.

== Notable people ==
- Maharaja Bir Bikram Kishore Manikya Debbarma Bahadur, King of Tripura State.
- Nanda Kumar Deb Barma, Tripuri language playwright, poet and lyricist.
- Pradyot Bikram Manikya Deb Barma
- S. D. Burman, music director, singer and composer in Bengali and Hindi language films
- Biplab Kumar Deb, 10th Chief Minister of Tripura.
- N. C. Debbarma, Former AIR Director, politician, current IPFT Chief and Revenue Minister of Tripura.
- Sourabhee Debbarma, singer (winner of Indian Idol 4)
- Kalpana Debnath, gymnast
- Mantu Debnath, gymnast
- Somdev Devvarman, professional Indian tennis player
- Manik Dey, member of the Communist Party of India (Marxist), former minister of Power, Urban Development, Rural Development and Transport in Government of Tripura
- David Dhawan, Bollywood film director
- Chandra Shekhar Ghosh, founder of Bandhan Bank
- Dipa Karmakar, gymnast. Represented India at 2016 Summer Olympics
- Borkung Hrangkhawl, rapper, singer, songwriter
- Naresh Mitra, Bengali actor and director
- Manisankar Murasingh, cricketer
- Bishweshwar Nandi, gymnast
- Jishnu Dev Varma, politician, 3rd Governor of Telangana and former Deputy Chief Minister of Tripura

== See also ==
- List of cities and towns in Tripura
- Tourism in North East India
- Centre for Forest Based Livelihood and Extension
- Advanced Research Centre for Bamboo and Rattan
