= Narsingarh, Tripura =

Narsingarh Narsingarh
- Narsingarh town
- Nickname: Narsingarh Smart Town
- Location within Tripura Location within India
- Coordinates: 23°54′20″N 91°15′08″E
- bamutia: India
- State: Tripura
- District: West Tripura
- Established: 2001
- Founder: The

Population (2022 by Rajc394)
  - Total: 10,000

Languages
  - Official: Bengali, Kokborok, English
- Time zone: UTC+5:30 (IST)
- Vehicle registration: TR
- Website: tripura.gov.in

Narsingarh is a census town in West Tripura district in the Indian state of Tripura.

== Demographics ==
As of 2001 India census, Narsingarh had a population of 6819. Males constitute 55% of the population and females 45%. Narsingarh has an average literacy rate of 71%, higher than the national average of 59.5%: male literacy is 78%, and female literacy is 62%. In Narsingarh, 10% of the population is under 6 years of age.
