= Tripura Cricket Association =

Governing body of cricket in Tripura state, India

- Sport: Cricket
- Abbreviation: TCA
- Founded: 1968
- Affiliation: BCCI
- Headquarters: Tripura Cricket Association, PO Chowmuhani, Agartala, West Tripura, PIN 799001
- Location: Tripura

Official website
- tcalive.com
- (India)

Tripura Cricket Association is the governing body for cricket in Tripura state in India and for the Tripura cricket team. It is affiliated to the Board of Control for Cricket in India.
