= Tripura cricket team =

Indian cricket team

Personnel
- Captain: Manisankar Murasingh
- Owner: Tripura Cricket Association

Team information
- Founded: 1985
- Home ground: Maharaja Bir Bikram College Stadium, Agartala
- Capacity: 30,000

History
- First-class debut: Bengal in 1985 at Eden Gardens, Calcutta
- Ranji Trophy wins: 0
- Vijay Hazare Trophy wins: 0
- Syed Mushtaq Ali Trophy wins: 0
- Official website: www.tcalive.com

The Tripura cricket team is a domestic cricket team based in Agartala, India. The team represents the Indian state of Tripura. The team competes in the First-class cricket competition known as the Ranji Trophy and the List A cricket Vijay Hazare Trophy and the T20 competition Syed Mushtaq Ali Trophy (SMAT).

== History ==
Cricket developed later in Tripura than in most other parts of India. Competitions were first organized in the early 1960s, and the Tripura Cricket Association was formed in 1968.

Tripura entered the Ranji Trophy, along with Goa and Himachal Pradesh, when the competition was expanded for the 1985–86 season. They have always been one of the weaker sides in the competition. Up to the end of the 2022–23 season, they had played 193 first-class matches resulting in nine wins, 120 losses and 64 draws. In List A cricket they had played 138 matches resulting in 26 wins, 111 losses and one no-result.

In 1985–86, fielding a team with no previous first-class experience, Tripura lost all four matches, the first three by an innings. In 1986–87 they drew their first match and lost the next three, two of them by an innings. The pattern continued. In 2001–02, their last season playing only against their East Zone neighbours – Assam, Bengal, Bihar and Orissa – Tripura lost two matches by an innings and drew the other two.

The Ranji Trophy was restructured for the 2002–03 season, and the lower-ranked teams from around India began to play each other. Tripura's fortunes improved only slightly at first. They registered two losses by an innings and three draws in 2002–03. In 2003–04 they drew all five matches, gaining a first-innings lead in two of them. In 2004–05 they lost three and drew two.

=== Tripura's first-class victories ===
Tripura won their first first-class victory in the 2005–06 season. Until then they had played 87 matches for 65 losses and 22 draws. In their last match of the season, after two draws and two losses, they played Himachal Pradesh at Maharaja Bir Bikram College Stadium in Agartala, Tripura's main home ground. Their captain, Rajib Dutta, scored 32 and 71 not out in a low-scoring match in which no one else reached 50, and Tripura won by 130 runs. Vineet Jain, Tripura's opening bowler, took 2 for 20 and 7 for 29.

Since then Tripura have registered a victory in most seasons. In 2006–07, again at Agartala and captained by Dutta, they beat Jammu and Kashmir by 132 runs, Jain taking 4 for 40 and 5 for 40. In 2007–08, once again at Agartala and now captained by Rajesh Banik, they beat Kerala by four wickets. Dutta top-scored with 47 to give Tripura a narrow first-innings lead, and Jain took 4 for 42 and 2 for 53. In 2008–09, captained by Tushar Saha, they had their first away victory when they beat Services by 54 runs at the Palam A Stadium in New Delhi. In 2009–10, once again at Agartala and captained by Dutta, they beat Rajasthan, who later went on to win the Ranji Trophy in 2010–11 and 2011–12, by one wicket. In 2010–11, captained again by Dutta, they beat Goa by seven wickets at Porvorim, Timir Chanda taking 4 for 35 and 7 for 116.

After a season without a victory Tripura, captained by Ajay Ratra, beat Himachal Pradesh at Atal Bihari Vajpayee Stadium in Nadaun in 2012–13 by 169 runs, Subhrajit Roy scoring 111 in the first innings. Manisankar Murasingh made 29 and 63 and took 4 for 86 and 1 for 34. Tripura's next victory came nearly four years later, when, in their most overwhelming victory to date, they beat Services by 219 runs in 2016–17 at Guwahati after declaring at 340 for 3 in their second innings. Udiyan Bose scored 165 and Smit Patel 127 not out, and the captain, Manisankar Murasingh, scored 22 in each innings and took three wickets in each innings.

In December 2018, during the sixth round of the 2018–19 Ranji Trophy, they beat Goa by 10 wickets. It was the first time that Tripura had won a match by 10 wickets and the first time they had earned a bonus point in the Ranji Trophy. Up to and including that fixture, they had played 171 first-class matches, winning only nine of them. However, in the following month, they were dismissed for 35 runs in their first innings against Rajasthan. It was their lowest total in first-class cricket.

== Individual records ==
Tripura's highest first-class score is 212 by Yogesh Takawale against Hyderabad in 2013–14. The best bowling figures are 8 for 133 by Timir Chanda against Himachal Pradesh in 2011–12. In October 2016 Rana Dutta became the first bowler to take a hat-trick for Tripura.

Rajib Dutta played in Tripura's first five victories, captaining the side in four of them.

== Home grounds ==
- Narsingarh Cricket Ground
- Maharaja Bir Bikram College Stadium
- Narsinghgarh International Cricket Stadium

== Famous Players ==
- Sourav Dasgupta (1985-2002)
- Alok Saha (1985-2001)
- Rajib Deb Burman (1985-2000)
- Sujit Roy (1992-2006)
- Timir Chanda (1995-2013)
- Subal Chowdhury (1995-2011)
- Rajib Dutta (1999-2014)
- Tushar Saha (2000-2012)
- Rana Dutta (2008-present)
- Manisankar Murasingh (2009-present)
- Udiyan Bose (2013-present)

== Players ==
=== Squad ===
- Players with International Caps are listed in **bold**.

Name	Birth date	Batting style	Bowling style	Note
Batters
Sridam Paul	1 February 2002 (age 24)	Right-handed	Right-arm medium	
**Hanuma Vihari**	13 October 1993 (age 33)	Right-handed	Right-arm off break	
Bikramkumar Das	15 November 1999 (age 26)	Left-handed	Right-arm off break	
Rajat Dey	31 December 1996 (age 29)	Right-handed	Right-arm off break	
Udiyan Bose	7 December 1993 (age 32)	Right-handed	Right-arm off break	
Hrituraj Roy	4 December 2001 (age 24)	Left-handed	Right-arm off break	
**Mandeep Singh**	18 December 1991 (age 34)	Right-handed	Right-arm medium	
All-rounders
Bikramjit Debnath	26 December 1998 (age 27)	Right-handed	Right-arm medium	
Amit Ali	26 October 2002 (age 24)	Right-handed	Right-arm leg break	
Sankar Paul	15 November 2000 (age 25)	Right-handed	Right-arm off break	
Wicket-keepers
Sentu Sarkar	1 December 2002 (age 23)	Left-handed		
Babul Dey	11 December 1999 (age 26)	Left-handed		
Arkaprabha Sinha	29 July 1998 (age 28)	Right-handed		
Spin Bowlers
Swapnil Singh	22 January 1991 (age 35)	Right-handed	Slow left-arm orthodox	Plays for **Royal Challengers Bengaluru** in IPL
Viki Saha	31 December 1997 (age 28)	Right-handed	Right-arm off break	
Saurabh Das	1 November 1993 (age 33)	Right-handed	Right-arm off break	
Parvez Sultan	18 July 2003 (age 23)	Left-handed	Slow left-arm orthodox	
Shubham Ghosh	7 October 1998 (age 28)	Right-handed	Right-arm off break	
Sandip Sarkar	6 August 2003 (age 23)	Right-handed	Right-arm off break	
Pace Bowlers
Manisankar Murasingh	1 January 1993 (age 33)	Left-handed	Right-arm medium	**Captain**
Abhijit Sarkar	20 December 1996 (age 29)	Right-handed	Right-arm medium	
Ajoy Sarkar	10 May 1997 (age 29)	Right-handed	Right-arm medium	
Saruk Hossain	11 October 2000 (age 26)	Left-handed	Left-arm medium	
Indrajith Debnath	1 December 2001 (age 24)	Right-handed	Right-arm medium	

Updated as on 26 October 2026
