= Lai Haraoba =

Traditional Meitei religious festival

Lai Haraoba (Meitei: ꯂꯥꯏ ꯍꯔꯥꯎꯕ)
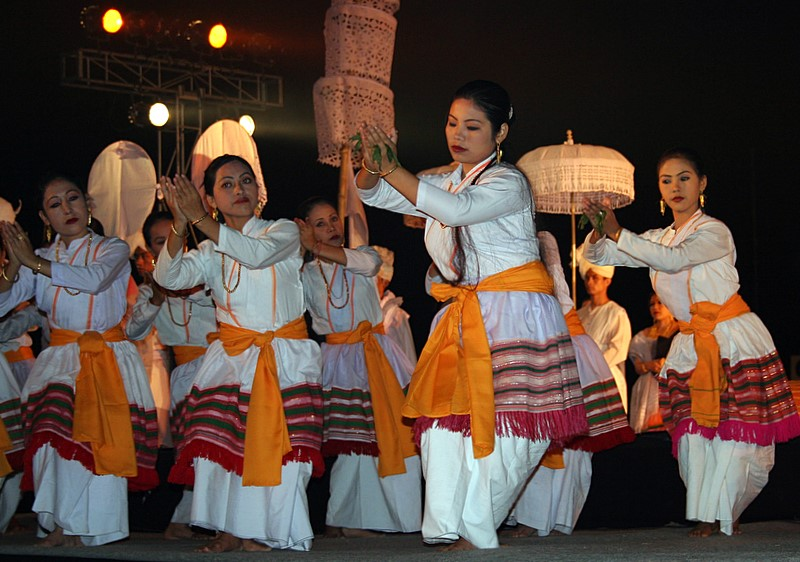
- A group of maibis (priestesses) performing a ritualistic dance in Lai Haraoba
- Nickname: Merrymaking of the gods; Pleasing of the deities
- Status: active
- Genre: festival
- Dates: between February and May or June
- Frequency: Annually
- Location: shrines of the Umang Lai deities
- Country: India; Bangladesh; Myanmar
- Founder: Pakhangba and Nongthang Leima (according to one account of Meitei mythology); Nongpok Ningthou & Panthoibi (according to another account of Meitei mythology)
- Participants: Maibas, Maibis and commoners
- Major events: holy and ritualistic, sacred, theatrical dance and music festival
- People: Meitei people and Sanamahists
- Lai Haraoba is also spelled as Lai Harauba, Lai Halaopa, Lai Halaupa, Lai Hoi Laoba, Lai Hoi Laopa, etc.

Lai Haraoba (Meitei: ꯂꯥꯏ ꯍꯔꯥꯎꯕ, Old Manipuri: ꯂꯥꯏ ꯍꯂꯥꯎꯄ, lit. 'Merrymaking/Pleasing of the deities'), also known as Umang Lai Haraoba, is a classical, ritualistic, theatrical dance and music festival, annually celebrated by the Meitei people (Sanamahists), to please the Umang Lai deities of the traditional Meitei religion (Sanamahism), predominantly in the Indian state of Manipur. It is a Meitei intangible cultural heritage. Outside Manipur, Lai Haraoba is also celebrated in places where the Meitei diaspora live, such as Assam, Tripura, Bangladesh, and Myanmar.

Lai Haraoba (under the name "Meitei Lai Haraoba") is recognised as one of the state holidays by the government of Tripura.

The government of Manipur puts effort in making Lai Haraoba to be recognised by the UNESCO as well as the Sangeet Natak Akademi (SNA), the highest academy of performing arts in India, on the Representative List of the Intangible Cultural Heritage of Humanity.

Lai Haraoba, along with the fusion of three other performing art forms, Huiyen Lallong, Meitei Nata Sankirtana and Raaslila, gave rise to the Sangeet Natak Akademi-recognised Indian classical dance form, popularly known as the "Manipuri dance".

== Interpretations of meaning ==
Elangbam Nilakanta Singh translates Lai Haraoba as the “merry making of the gods and goddesses,” and many others use this meaning. Saroj Nalini Parratt and John Parratt translate it as “pleasing of the gods,” based on J. Shakespeare’s (1913) translation, but they make it plural because the festival honors more than one god. Practitioners of the ritual say that the name comes from the "lai hoi laoba," the cry of ‘hoi’, in the Meitei creation myth, which marks the moment the universe is revealed. This idea is given by Ng. Kulachandra, the former head of the Manipur Pandit Loishang.

== Origin ==
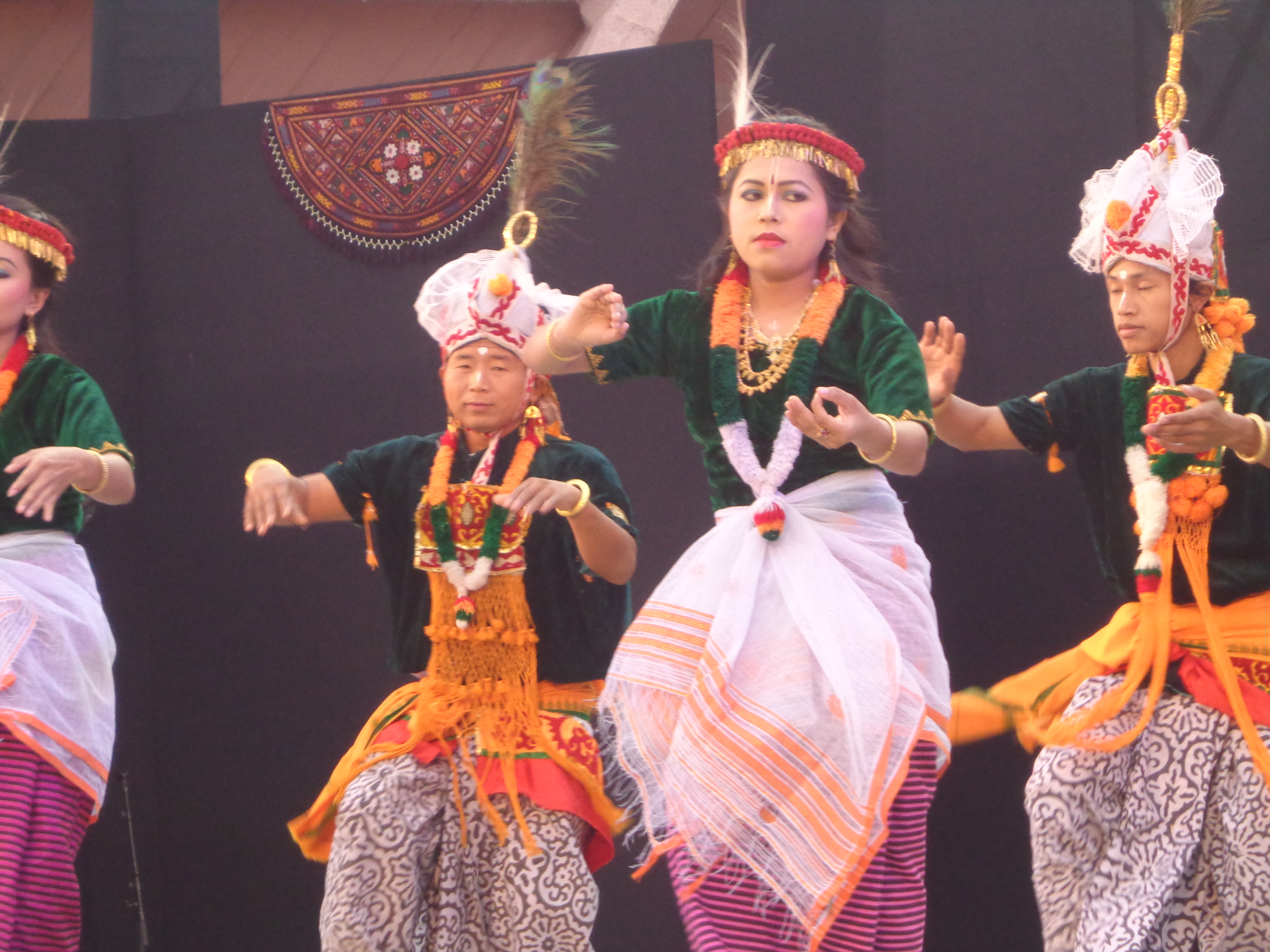
A dance performance during the Lai Haraoba festival

Lai Haraoba (Meitei: ꯂꯥꯏ ꯍꯔꯥꯎꯕ) is a ritualistic festival of the Meiteis observed since ancient times. It is a ritual enactment of the creation myth. It mirrors the entire culture of Manipur and depicts the close affinities between the hill and plain people. It is a combination of religious recitations, traditional music and dance, traditional social values and ancient cultural aspects.

The rituals within the festival are the same except in some items or hymns, such as ikouba, ikourol, and yakairol at the beginning and mikon thagonba, ngaprum tanba at the end of the festival. In the performances, the evolution story with the amorous love-affairs of Nongpok Ninghthou and Panthoibi is depicted and played equally in all kinds of lai haraoba. According to folklore, the gods held the first Lai Haraoba on the Koubru Hill so that their descendants would imitate them by performing the same rites.

== Places and timings ==
Lai Haraoba takes place at local shrines dedicated to the Umang Lai deities, which are important to the traditional Meitei religion. The festival doesn't have fixed dates but happens between February and May or June. Each shrine chooses its own dates for the festival. The festival can last from three days to over a month, depending on the shrine. The dates and length of the festival can be different for each shrine.

== Deities ==
The Lai Haraoba is also called the Umang Lai Haraoba, named after the Umang Lai deities, honored during the festival. These deities are seen as protectors of the areas where the shrines are located. The festival takes place at these shrines, and the whole community helps with the preparations. The Umang Lai group includes over 300 deities, such as ancestors, legendary forefathers, and other important gods in the traditional Meitei religion (Sanamahism).

=== Male and female aspects ===
The rituals of Lai Haraoba honor a male and a female deity, called Lainingthou and Lairembi/Lairemma. The rituals focus on creation. The Meitei people believe that the supreme god created the cosmos. He is called Tengbanba Mapu or Taibangpanba Mapu or Atiya Sidaba. Some creation stories start with these gods, while others go back to Atingkok and Amamba. Amamba is the dark place where life begins.

== Types and variations ==
Four types of Lai Haraoba are prevalent in the Meitei society, namely, Kanglei Haraoba, Moirang Haraoba, Kakching Haraoba and Chakpa Haraoba. Kanglei Haraoba is performed mainly in Imphal and the nearby towns. Moirang Haraoba is only in Moirang, Kakching Haraoba is held in Kakching and Chakpa Haraoba is celebrated at Andro, Phayeng, Sekmai, Koutruk, Khuukhul, Leimaram and Tairenpokpi.

=== Kanglei Haraoba ===
One type of Lai Haraoba is Kanglei Haraoba, celebrated in and around Imphal. The name Kanglei comes from Kangla, which is in the center of Imphal. The main deity worshipped is Pakhangba. A special part of this festival is when Khoriphaba, a deity, looks for a ‘bride’. A maibi (spirit medium) calls on Khoriphaba's spirit to choose the bride. The festival ends with the nongarol, which shows the rise of the divine presence.

=== Moirang Haraoba ===
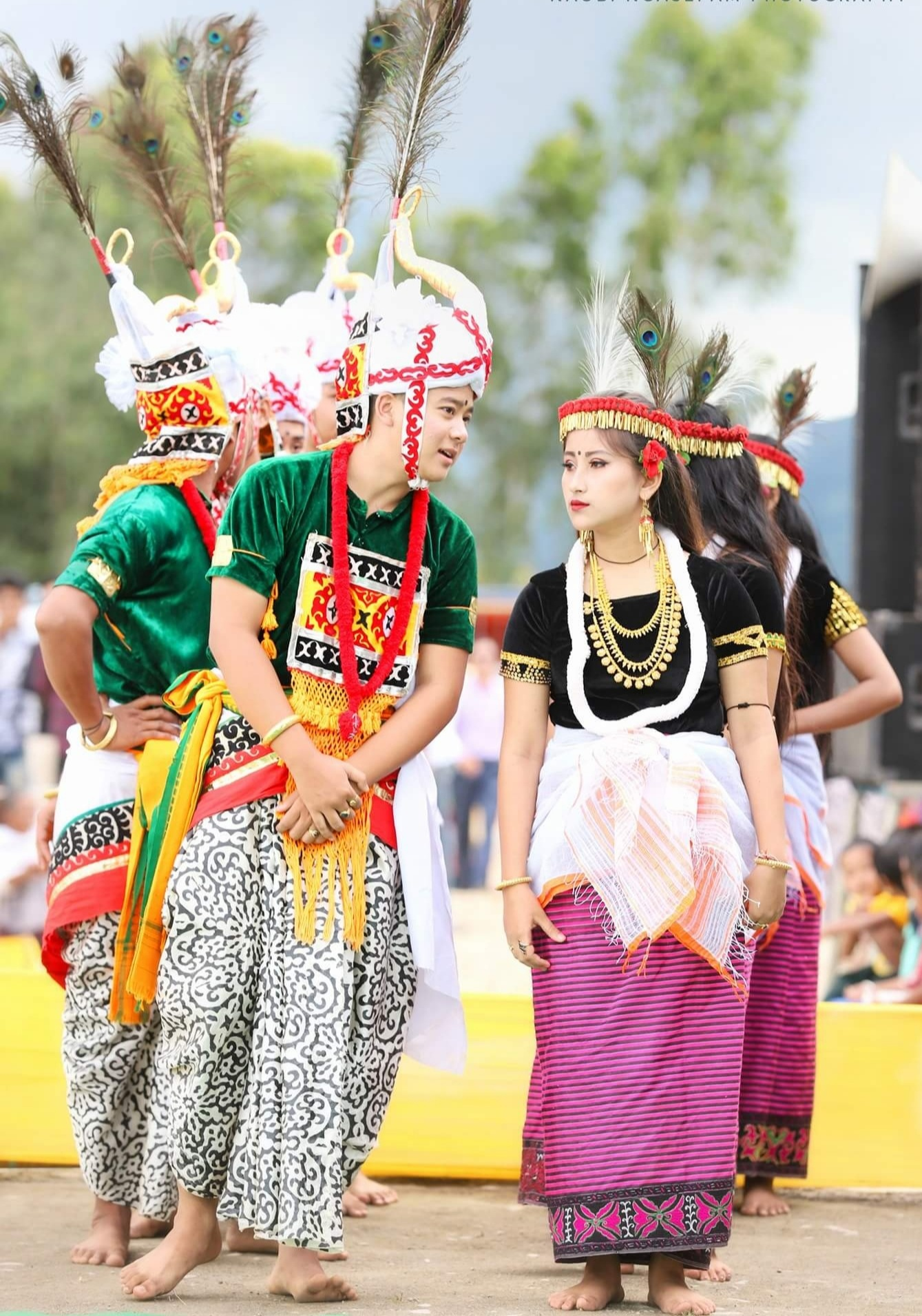
Performance of the Khamba Thoibi classical dance in Lai Haraoba

Moirang Haraoba is celebrated in and around the Moirang region in the southern part of the Imphal valley. The main deity worshipped is Thangching (Thangjing). In this version, along with langthrei leaves (a common offering in the Kanglei version), leisang, another evergreen plant, is also offered. A special part of this festival is the Khamba Thoibi classical dance. The festival ends with tengtharol (a song of lamentation), which marks the rise of the deities.

=== Chakpa Haraoba ===
Chakpa Haraoba is not a separate type of the festival, but a group of versions celebrated by Chakpa groups in different villages. The hand movements are simpler, and the structure is less complex. It includes sacrificial practices. The main versions are from Andro, Imphal East and Phayeng villages. In Andro, a special ritual called Numit Kappa (shooting of the sun) is performed, which is unique to them. The Phayeng tradition has special rituals, like "Lai Phagi Tounaba," which are not done in other places.

=== Kakching Haraoba ===
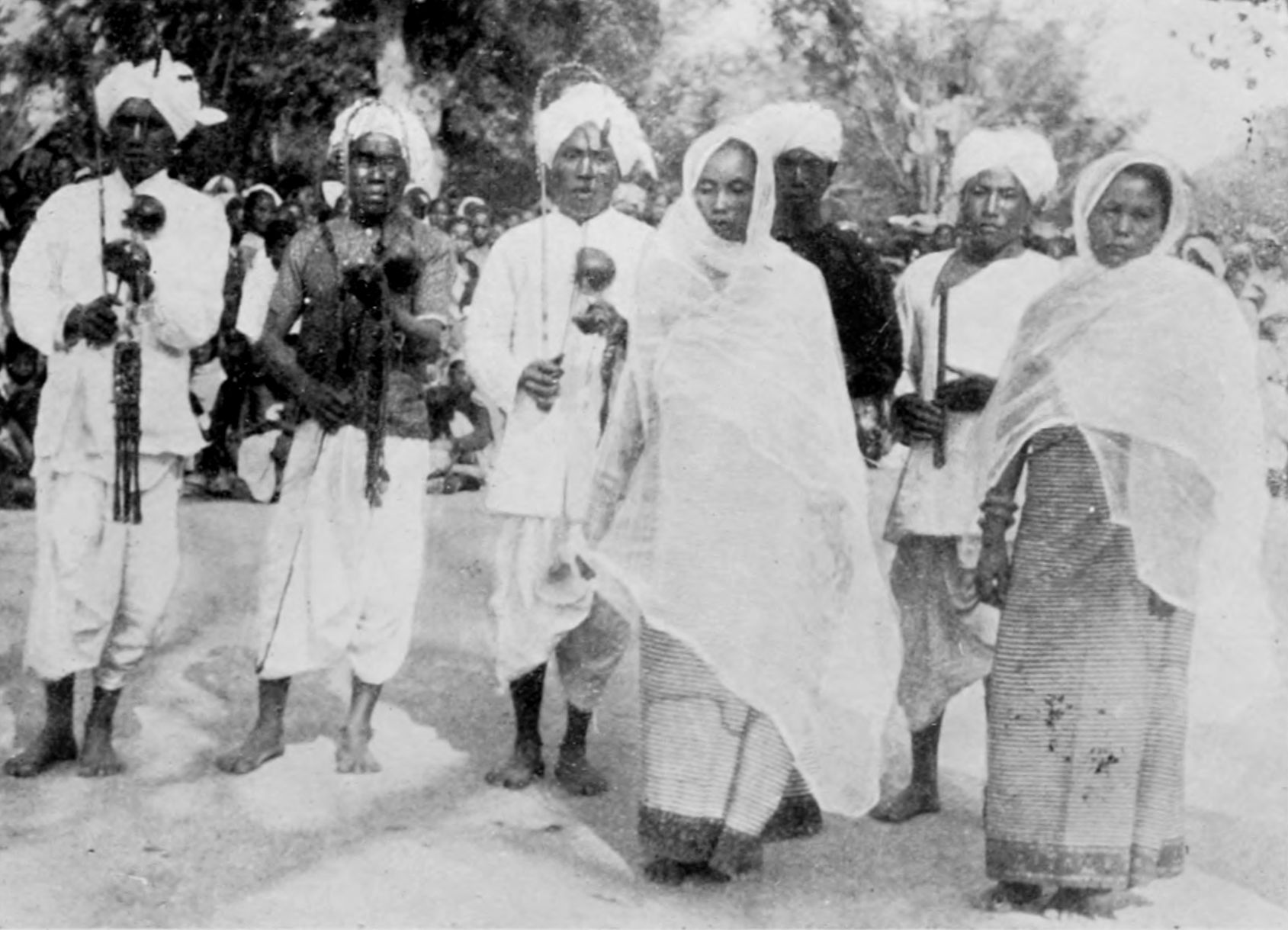
An orchestra, including pena (musical instrument) players and married women, in honor of God Khamlangba

Kakching Haraoba is celebrated in the Kakching region, east of Imphal. A special part of the festival is the "Ngaprum Tanba" ritual (hunting of eel) on the last day. People have different opinions on whether it should be a separate type of festival. Some think it should be part of Kanglei, while others think it should be under Chakpa Haraoba. Dr. Kh. Ratankumar Singh sees it as a separate type. However, each shrine often has its own unique practices.

== Rituals ==
The Lai Haraoba rituals are led by special people. There are three old traditions. The three traditions are maiba, maibi, and asheiba (pena (musical instrument) is about the music with a special fiddle). Only men can follow maiba and asheiba. Only women can follow maibi, which is about connecting with spirits.

The Lai Haraoba rituals are detailed and cover many parts. They can be divided into three parts. These parts are the beginning, the middle, and the end. The parts are called Lai Eekouba, Haraoba, and Lairoi respectively. The Lai Eekouba marks the descent of the god (Lai in Meitei language). The Lairoi marks the ascent. The days in between follow a similar pattern. The number of days in between can change. This makes the festival last anywhere from three days to over three weeks.

=== Lai Eekouba ===
The Lai Eekouba rituals focus on bringing a sacred presence into the shrine for the festival. Before the rituals, the doors of the shrine, which are usually closed all year, are opened. This is called "lai thong hangba," meaning "opening of the shrine doors." It happens on a lucky day before the Eekouba rituals. After opening, the shrine is cleaned, and sacred images and objects are prepared. The utensils are cleaned, clothes for the ceremonies are washed, and the sacred images are taken out. Sometimes, preparations begin even before opening the shrine, like making rice beer for the event. This process is done with special songs and rituals.

In the Eekouba ritual, the sacred presence is brought through water. This is done at a pond or river. A procession goes from the shrine to the water. There, offerings are made and deities are called. A maibi performs the ritual by chanting and ringing bells. The maibi may go into a trance and speak messages from the spirits. The sacred objects come to life during this time. Afterward, the procession returns to the shrine, and the objects are placed in their spots. The day ends with the pena (musical instrument) fiddle player, who plays music and sings to rest the deities for the night, with a rite called "naosumba". This is the first day of the festival.

=== Haraoba ===
The second day starts with the awakening rite (yakeiba). The pena fiddle player plays in the morning to wake up the deity. Some rituals are done, like bathing (iru sadengba) and removing bad energies (anam-aha kokpa). People bring fruits, rice, grains, flowers, incense, and candles as offerings. The morning prayers are recited, and the offerings are given. The main ritual happens in the evening. Music and dance are an important part of it. They are not just for performance, but part of the ritual. The evening starts with offering flowers, called "Lei Langba." The person in charge of the flowers or their helper does this. The maibis show respect before starting the dance of Thougal Jagoi. This dance is a way to honor the Lai and get ready for the day’s work. The songs in the dance praise the deity. The maibis lead the dance, and everyone in the community can join. After the dance, the Laibou part of the ritual starts.

==== Laibou ====
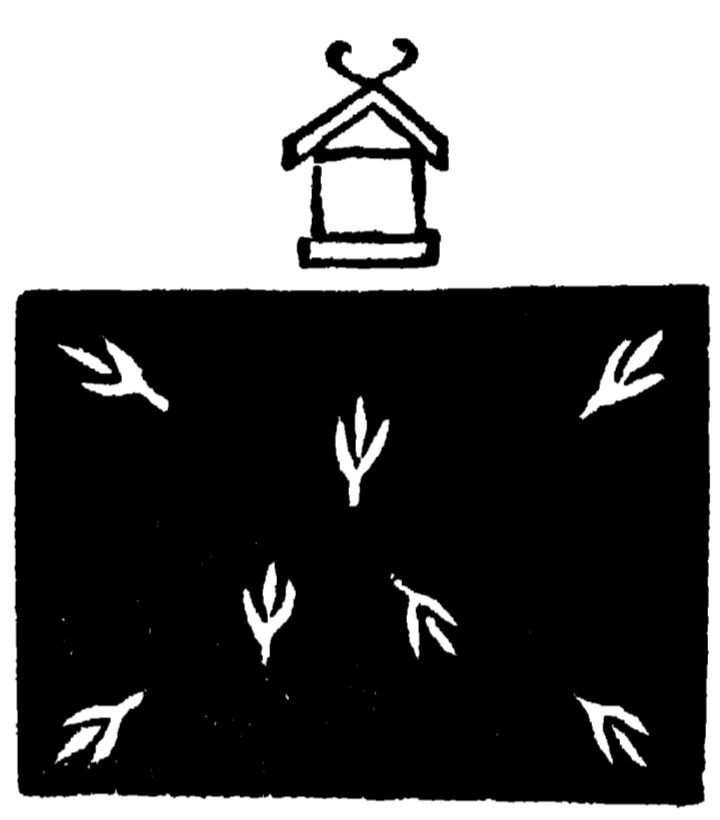
Position of placing banana trees in front of the shrine, during the Lai Haraoba celebration

The laibou rituals are the main part of the Lai Haraoba. Before this, a banana leaf with a small offering and sacred langthrei leaves are placed in the center of the area. The maibis then dance to bring the sacred presence into the space. This dance is called Laiching Jagoi, or "the dance to draw out the deities." The dance is accompanied only by the sound of the pena (musical instrument) fiddle, with no singing. After the dance, everyone shouts "hoi" together in a song called hoi laoba. They follow the maiba’s lead. The singing style is similar to the closing song, wakol laoba, but it is different from other ritual songs. This singing style is called "antiphonal songs," which is different from other ritual songs.

The laibou rituals are performed in a procession that goes around the performance area. The rituals symbolize the creation of the human body, birth, building a house, farming, and weaving. The procession, led by the maibi, starts in front of the shrine and moves around the area, showing respect to the four directions and their deities.

The dance begins with the creation of the body. The maibi dances to show how each part of the body is made, like carving the eyes, drawing the brows, and marking the soles of the feet. Then, the baby is 'born' and cared for. As the child grows, clothing is needed. To make clothes, the hillside is cleared to grow cotton, which is then processed and woven. To protect the child, a house is built, with frames made and mud used to plaster the walls. When the child grows older, they go fishing, which symbolizes physical desires. Throughout this ritual, there are clear references to everyday life and culture.

==== After Laibou ====
After the Laibou, the Padon Jagoi follows. In this, the maibis form a line, led by a senior maibi, and dance in a serpentine pattern in the performance area. Next, a series of rites takes place, focusing on the phibul (a ball of cloth) and the phijang, which is a piece of white cloth held by four poles. These four poles form a ritual umbrella and banners. The four corners of the cloth are held by the poles. Two maibis, each holding a sacred object, dance around the poles, moving under the cloth. After the rites, the cloth is gathered up and returned to the shrine. It is sometimes called as a part of the ritual "canopy cycle." The day ends with the participants drawing serpentine patterns, called "Lairen Mathek Chatpa." Then, the sacred objects are put back in the shrine, and the Wakol song is sung. The deities are put to rest with a lullaby called Naosumba, played by the pena.

==== Special rites ====
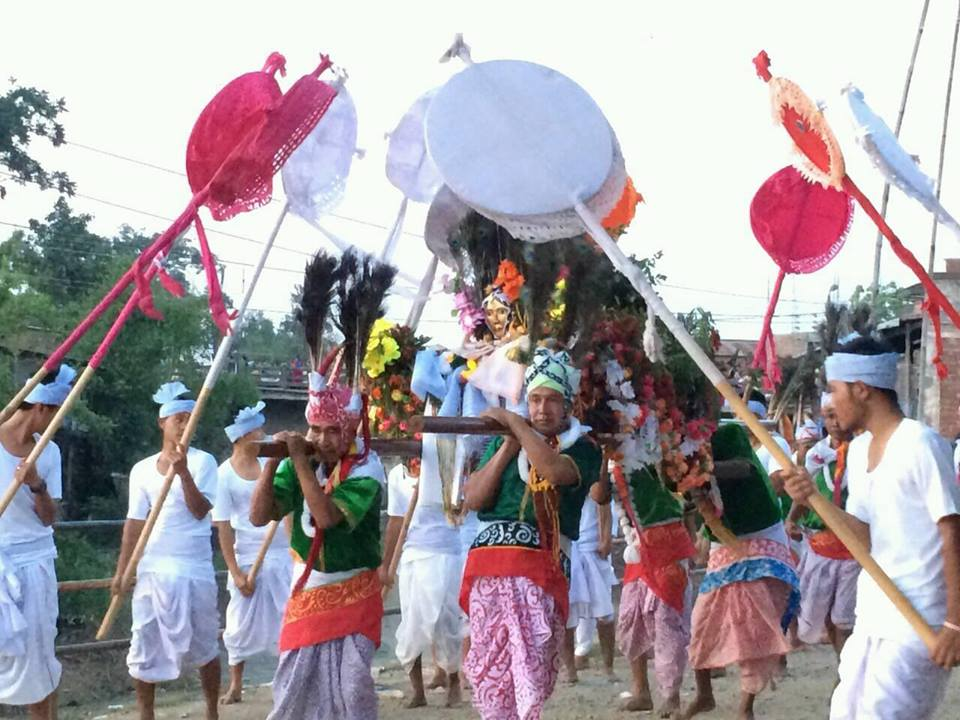
"Lai Lam-thokpa" street procession - An outdoor ritual ceremony of a Lai Haraoba performance

Some rites are done only on certain days. One is the "Saroi Khangba," where food is offered to lesser spirits. Another is the "Kanglei Thokpa," where the spirit of the deity Khoriphaba is called. This is also known as "Lai Nupi Thiba," meaning "search for the bride." A more visible rite is the "Lai Lam-thokpa" street procession, where the procession moves outside with a big celebration and many people.

=== Lairoi ===
The Lairoi rituals happen on the last day and mark the end of the festival. These rituals focus on closing the sacred time and space of Lai Haraoba. One ritual is "Thang Jagoi," a dance with blades, performed by a maibi at the four corners to remove bad energies. Another ritual is Loutaba, also called Tangkhul-Nurabi, which is about two important mythological figures. Loutaba is like a skit with comedy, myths, chants, and some improvisation. Other closing rituals include Ougri Hangel, Thawai Mi-konba, Sharit Litpa, and Khencho Chongba.

The sacred presence is let go with the Lai Nongaba rite, marking its departure and return to the other realm. A boat is made for this journey. The Uyarol songs describe the tree being cut down, and the Hijing Hirao songs describe making the boat. The ascent is marked by the Higa Ishei hymn, and the ritual ends with the Nongarol hymn. When returning to the shrine, the sacred images and items used in the ritual are taken apart, all on the same night. A Leihun offering of langthrei leaves is made, and the shrine doors are closed for five days. On the fifth day, the maibi comes back to remove the offering and prepare a new one. This final rite, called Leihun Tamba, ends the Lairoi rituals.

== Lai Haraoba Ishei ==
Lai Haraoba Ishei is a famous folk song played mainly during Lai Haraoba. This song contains lyrics with veiled references to erotic mysticism. The main quality of the song is the rhythm in its tune.

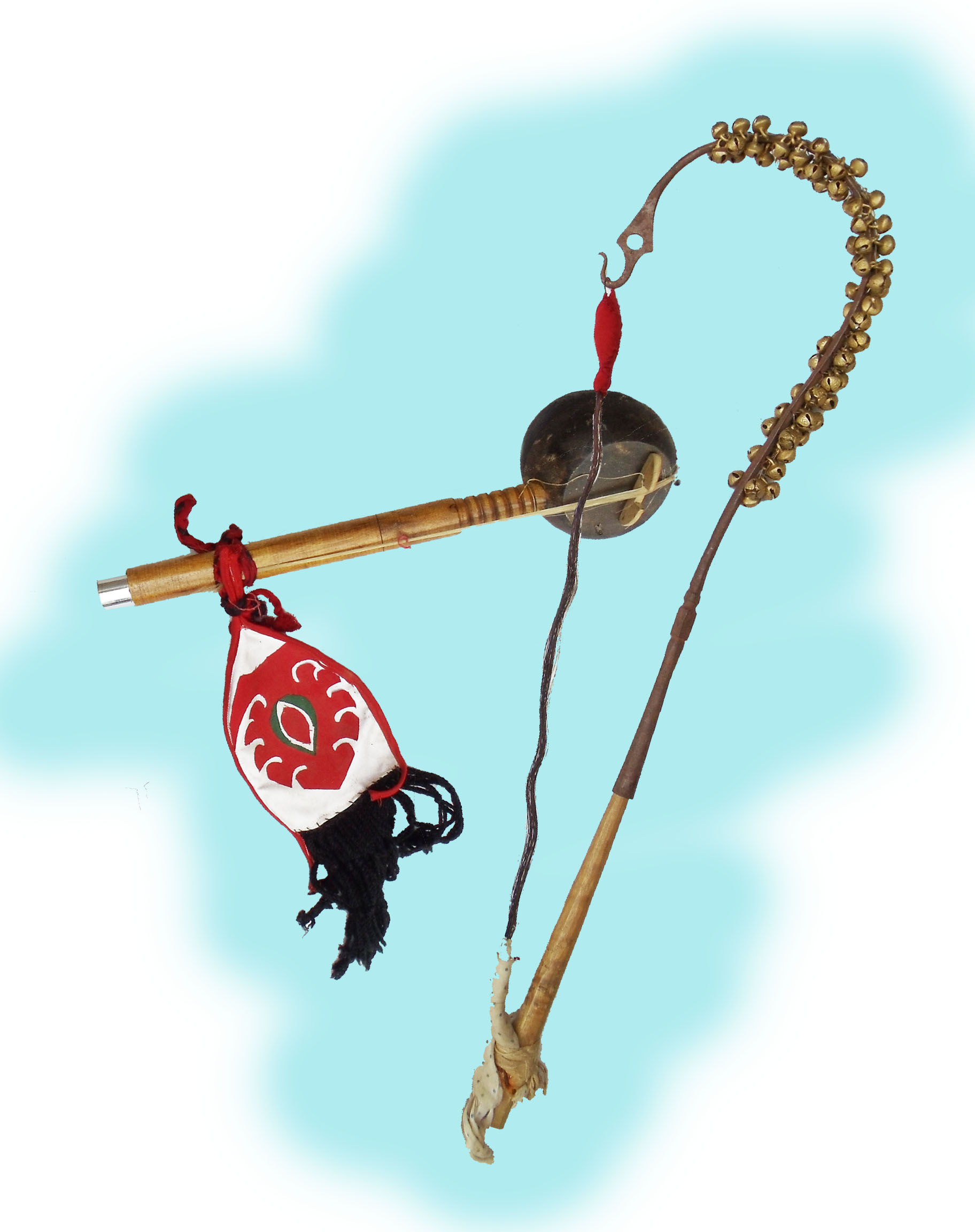
The pena, a musical instrument used in the festival

== Sports ==
In Lai Haraoba, the day after the Lairoi (last day of rituals) was for sports events. These events included many traditional Meitei games and sports. Some of the games were Yubi Lakpi, which is a traditional Meitei rugby and uses an oiled slippery coconut and oiled bodies. Another game was Khong Kangjei, which is a traditional Meitei hockey. Mukna is a traditional Meitei wrestling, and mukna-kangjei is a mix of wrestling and hockey. Thouri Chingnaba is a traditional Meitei tug of war.

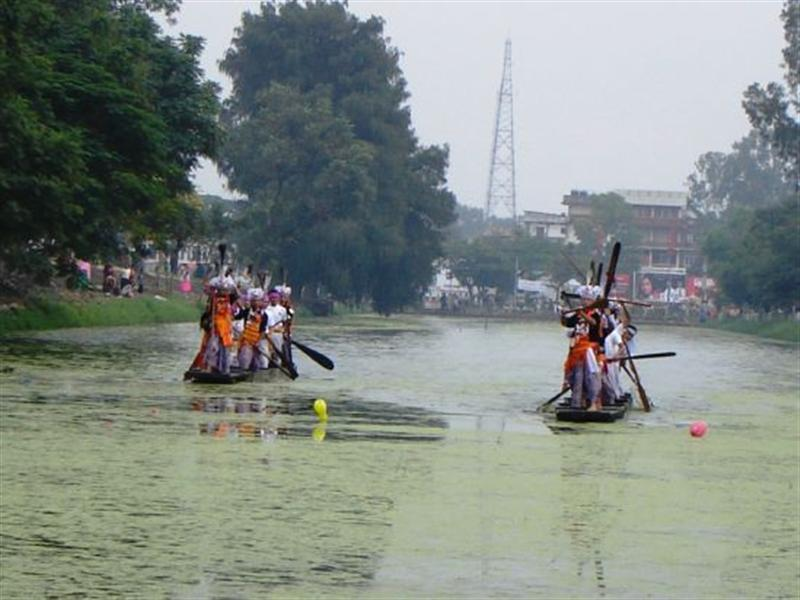
Hiyang Tannaba, a classical Meitei boat racing cultural event, performed as a part of the celebration of the Lai Haraoba celebration

== Influences on other performing arts ==
Dance forms of Lai Haraoba helped create the Manipuri dance style and inspired the Manipuri Ras Lila, one of India's classical dances. The focus on dance has shaped how people see and talk about Lai Haraoba, both in Manipur and outside. But Lai Haraoba is more than just dance, music, or religion. It is an important part of the culture and has helped the Meitei people strengthen their identity, especially in relation to Hindu culture. The festival and its traditions show the Meitei view of the world and their values. It also reflects their material culture.

== By place ==
=== Bangladesh ===
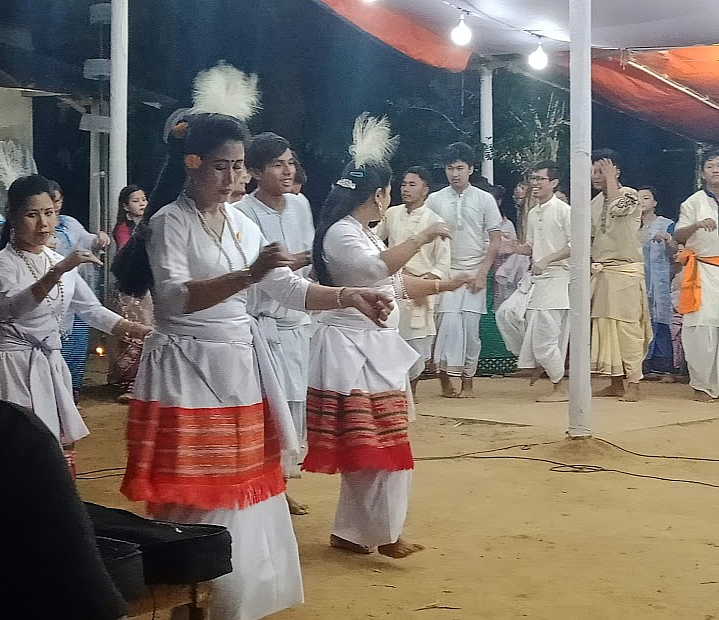
Maibis (traditional Meitei priestesses) dancing to please the Umang Lai deities of Sanamahism during Lai Haraoba in Bangladesh

Lai Haraoba (Meitei: ꯂꯥꯏ ꯍꯔꯥꯎꯕ, Bengali: লাই হরাওবা) is a traditional cultural and religious festival celebrated by the Meitei people in Bangladesh. The festival honors the gods and spirits of Sanamahism, the traditional Meitei pantheon, through a series of rituals, music, and dance. It is characterized by classical Manipuri dance, devotional songs, and the use of traditional instruments, such as the pung (drum). Lai Haraoba, being a Meitei intangible cultural heritage, serves as an important cultural event for the Meitei diaspora in Bangladesh, playing a key role in the preservation and transmission of Meitei religious and cultural practices.

The festival encompasses various cultural expressions, including rituals, music, dance, and religious performances. It is held annually and is rooted in the social customs and traditions of the Meitei community. The practices associated with Lai Haraoba involve elements of performing arts and ritual observances that are transmitted orally and through community participation.

==== Assistance by UNESCO & Government of Bangladesh ====
In April 2025, a three-day Lai Haraoba festival was announced to be held at the Manipur Cultural Complex in Bangladesh, beginning on April 23. The event was jointly supported by UNESCO, the Government of Bangladesh, and the Consulate General of India. According to Mutua Bahadur, director of the Mutua Museum, a 12-member delegation from Manipur, including priests, priestesses, and a Pena artist, departed for Bangladesh on April 20 to participate in the festival and bring necessary ritual items.

The festival in Bangladesh marked the first instance of it being conducted under the authority of the Government of Bangladesh and was intended to engage the Meetei community residing there with traditional Umang Lai Haraoba practices.

A group of instructors trained in Maibi Jagoi and Pena (musical instrument) had already been sent to Bangladesh to provide cultural training to the local Meetei population. The festival was conducted, in the name of Makong Leima Lairembi, by ritual specialists from Manipur, with emphasis on maintaining the original form of the ceremonies without adaptations commonly seen in some regional versions.

The event was organized with help from several groups. These included the Bangladesh National Museum, Porei Apokpa Marup Religious Cultural Organization, the Indian Council for Cultural Relations (ICCR), the Consortium of Intangible Cultural Heritage of Bangladesh (CIB), and Sadhana – A Center for the Advancement of South Asian Culture.

==== Assistance by the Government of Manipur ====
In October 2022, Leishangthem Susindro Meitei, an Indian politician serving in the Government of Manipur, gave 20,000 INR to the committee that manages the shrine of the Meitei goddess Ima Ujao Lairembi in Adampur Konagao, to help with organizing the Lai Haraoba festival, during his visit to meet the Meitei people in Bangladesh during their festival Ningol Chakkouba, being sent by Nongthombam Biren Singh, the then Chief Minister of Manipur.

==== Places ====
Place where Lai Haraoba was celebrated with the help of the UNESCO

Lai Haraoba is a traditional festival observed by the Meitei people (alias Manipuris) in the Sylhet Division of Bangladesh. The festival is primarily celebrated in Kamalganj Upazila, located in Moulvibazar District. It is recognized as a significant cultural practice among the Meitei population in the region.

==== Recognition of its domains ====
According to the "Cultural Heritage Inventory of Bangladesh (CHIB), Cultural Heritage Hub of Bangladesh (CHIB)", the knowledge and practices related to Lai Haraoba are associated with several domains of intangible cultural heritage. These include oral traditions and expressions, performing arts, social customs and traditions, knowledge and practices concerning nature and the universe, and traditional craftsmanship. The festival is maintained and transmitted through both individual and collective efforts within the community.

==== Characteristics ====
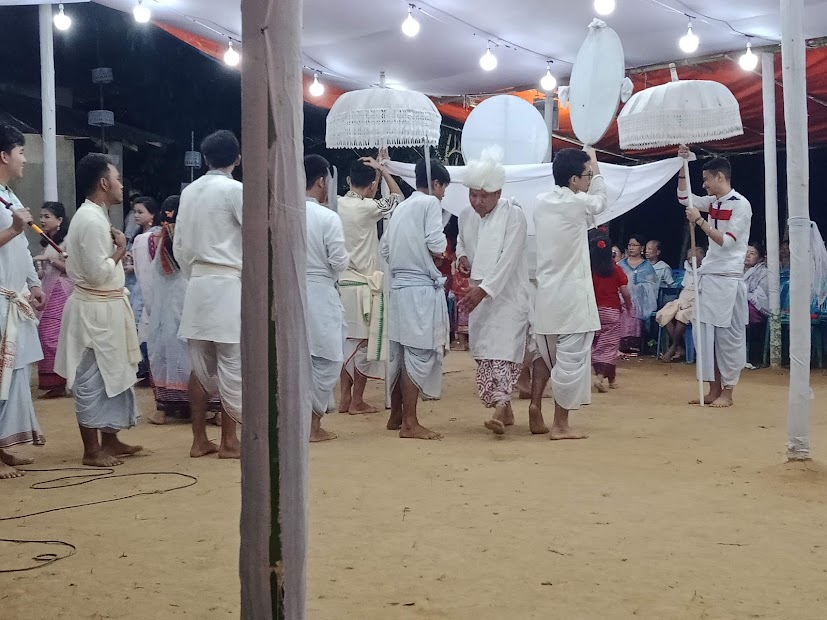
Holding holy & sacred parasols by the devotees of Umang Lai deities of Sanamahism during Lai Haraoba in Bangladesh

===== Practitioners and performers =====
Lai Haraoba involves a range of participants with specific roles in the performance and transmission of the tradition:

- Maibi: Female ritual specialists who are central to the festival. They are responsible for leading rituals, dances, chants, and songs. Maibis may be of any age but typically undergo structured training. Their role is not determined by social status, though knowledge is often transmitted through family lines.
- Maiba: Male counterparts to the Maibis. They provide ritual assistance, play musical instruments, and participate in selected ceremonial functions.
- Dancers and Musicians: Male dancers may perform alongside Maibis, often representing mythological or divine figures. Musicians play traditional instruments, including the pena and cymbals, to accompany the performances.
- Community Members: The broader Meitei community participates in the festival as attendees, supporters, and volunteers. Their involvement includes logistical support, donations, and informal participation.

===== Other tradition bearers =====
In addition to ritual performers, several individuals and groups contribute to the maintenance of the tradition:

- Pena Khongba: A specialist who plays the pena, a traditional Meitei bowed string instrument.
- Artisans: Craftspeople involved in producing costumes, headgear, masks, and other ritual items. These items are essential for the visual and symbolic aspects of the festival.
- General Community: Community involvement is integral to the continuity of Lai Haraoba. Contributions include volunteering, funding, and preparation.

===== Language and speech forms =====
The festival involves the use of the Meitei language, as well as distinct speech forms and registers:

- Language: Meitei is the primary language used during rituals, chants, and songs. It is written in its indigenous script.
- Register and Speech Levels: A formal register is used during prayers and hymns, while informal language is used in casual interactions. Ritual speech often employs an elevated form to denote reverence.

===== Associated tangible elements =====
Several material components are associated with the practice of Lai Haraoba:

- Costumes: Participants wear ritual attire made from silk or brocade, often decorated with traditional motifs. Specific garments and headgear correspond to roles or deities represented.
- Masks: Used in certain performances to depict divine or mythical characters. These are typically made from wood or papier-mâché and painted.
- Shrines: Celebrations occur at shrines dedicated to Umang Lai (forest deities), which include altars and ritual spaces.
- Musical Instruments: The pena, a single-stringed bowed lute, and cymbals are commonly used. The pena is considered one of the oldest traditional instruments of the Meitei people.

===== Gender roles =====
Lai Haraoba assigns defined roles to participants based on gender:

- Women: Central to the festival as Maibis, who perform major rituals and artistic expressions. They also take part in music and dance.
- Men: Participate in supporting roles as Maibas, dancers, or musicians.
- Other Community Members: Individuals of all genders may contribute through organizing, volunteering, and attending the festival.

===== Division of labor =====
The festival relies on a structured division of responsibilities:

- Maibis: Lead ritual and performance elements.
- Maibas: Provide support during ceremonies.
- Hereditary Specialists: Families tasked with preserving specific rituals.
- Musicians and Drummers: Supply rhythmic and melodic accompaniment.
- Artisans: Responsible for producing ritual attire and props.
- Oral Historians: Convey the meaning and origin of rituals.
- Community Volunteers: Handle preparations, logistics, and general support.

===== Related practices =====
Lai Haraoba is connected to broader cultural and religious frameworks:

- Meitei mythology: Rituals often depict narratives related to Meitei cosmology and creation myths.
- Sanamahi religion: Provides the theological and ritual foundation for many elements of the festival.
- Language Preservation: Use of Meitei contributes to the maintenance of the language.
- Traditional Crafts: Involves the use and transmission of artisanal knowledge.
- Community Life: Functions as a social event that reinforces collective identity.

===== Modes of transmission =====
Transmission occurs through both traditional and contemporary methods:

- Traditional Transmission: Knowledge is passed down through apprenticeships, family instruction, and community participation.
- Contemporary Methods: Documentation and media are used for preservation and education.

===== Organizations involved =====
While there is no centralized authority overseeing Lai Haraoba, several local entities support its continuity:

- Community-Based Organizations: Local Meitei groups organize the festival, manage logistics, collect resources, and encourage participation.

==== Status ====
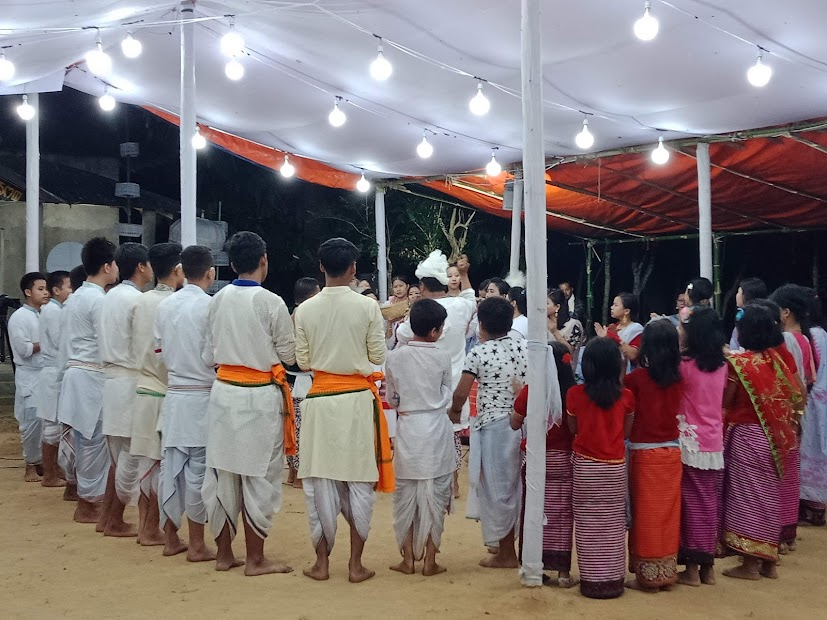
Meitei people of all age groups participating in Lai Haraoba, for the Umang Lai deities of Sanamahism in Bangladesh

===== Threats to enactment =====
Lai Haraoba, while still observed by Meitei communities in Bangladesh, faces several challenges that affect its continuity:

- Endangered Language: The primary language used in Lai Haraoba, Meitei, is considered at risk due to a declining number of fluent speakers. This poses a threat to the preservation of the ritual vocabulary and oral expressions integral to the festival.
- Urbanization and Modernization: Socioeconomic changes, including urban development and the adoption of modern lifestyles, have contributed to a shift away from traditional practices. Younger members of the community may have limited exposure to Lai Haraoba, reducing intergenerational transmission.
- Resource Constraints: Financial limitations and the lack of institutional support restrict the scale at which the festival can be organized. This can affect the performance quality and reduce opportunities for broader community involvement.
- Loss of Traditional Knowledge: Much of the knowledge associated with Lai Haraoba, including ritual procedures and performance techniques, is transmitted orally and through practice. The absence of formal documentation or training mechanisms increases the risk of knowledge erosion.

===== Threats to transmission =====
The transmission of Lai Haraoba within the Meitei community in Bangladesh is subject to the following constraints:

- Limited Number of Practitioners: The scarcity of trained Maibis and Maibas reduces the capacity to conduct the festival in its full form. This limitation has led to increased reliance on individuals or resources from Manipur, India, and may result in a simplified or symbolic version of the ritual.

===== Threats to associated tangible elements =====
Material elements linked to Lai Haraoba are also under threat:

- Costumes and Ritual Objects: The availability of skilled artisans capable of producing traditional costumes, headgear, and masks is limited in Bangladesh. This may affect the authenticity and continuity of these elements.
- Musical Instruments: Traditional instruments such as the pena and cymbals are not widely produced or maintained in Bangladesh. In some cases, communities depend on imports from Manipur, which may not be sustainable due to cost and accessibility.

===== Viability of associated intangible elements =====
The viability of intangible aspects of Lai Haraoba is also a concern:

- Knowledge and Skills: Ritual knowledge and performance skills are largely held by a small number of individuals. Without systematic transmission or documentation, these competencies are at risk of decline.
- Oral Traditions: Oral narratives and liturgical texts are primarily preserved through elderly practitioners. A limited pool of active learners may hinder the continuation of these traditions.

==== Safeguards ====
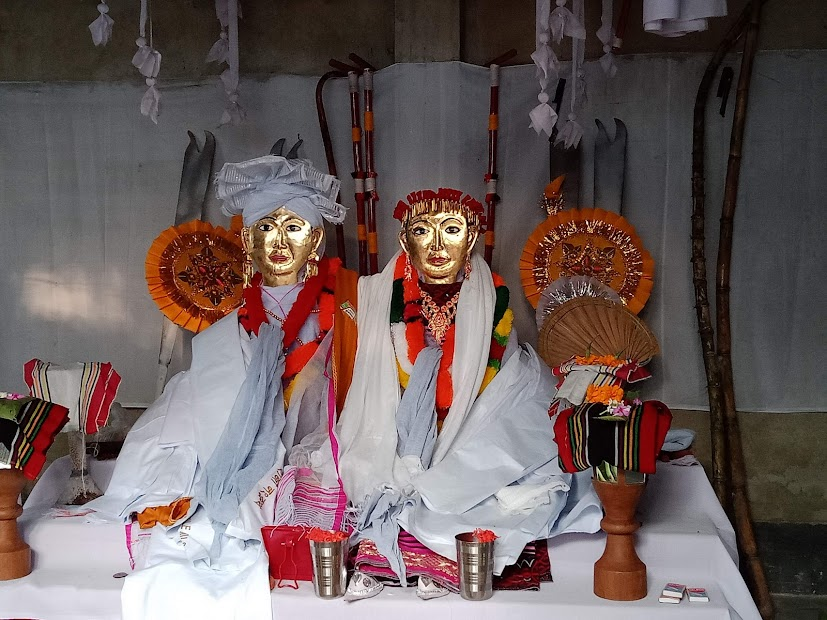
Holy & sacred images of Goddess Ujao Lairembi & her divine consort, who are the Umang Lai deities of Sanamahism, worshipped by the Meitei people in Bangladesh

Safeguarding efforts are currently led by community-based initiatives:

- Community-Led Practices: Meitei communities in Bangladesh continue to observe Lai Haraoba on a limited scale. Knowledge and practices are maintained and transmitted informally within families and community groups.

===== Existing safeguarding measures =====
Lai Haraoba in Bangladesh is currently maintained through limited-scale celebrations organized by members of the Meitei community. These events contribute to the continuity of the tradition by offering opportunities for intergenerational transmission of knowledge and practice, despite the overall decline in practitioners and available resources.

===== Proposed safeguarding measures =====
To enhance the viability of Lai Haraoba in Bangladesh, the following measures are proposed:

- Community-Based Training Initiatives: The development of structured apprenticeship programs and community workshops may facilitate the transfer of ritual knowledge, performance techniques, and related cultural practices to younger members of the community.
- Documentation and Archiving: Systematic recording of rituals, oral traditions, and region-specific variations of Lai Haraoba can serve as a resource for preservation, research, and future revitalization efforts.
- Material and Financial Support: Provision of financial assistance to ritual specialists and local artisans involved in the creation of costumes, instruments, and other associated elements may help sustain the material aspects of the festival.
- Public Outreach and Integration: Incorporating Lai Haraoba into cultural events, educational programs, and public performances may increase awareness and facilitate broader community engagement.

These measures may be implemented through collaboration between local communities, cultural organizations, and academic institutions, with the aim of supporting the long-term safeguarding of Lai Haraoba as practiced in Bangladesh.

==== Literature, discography, audiovisual materials, archives ====
===== Audiovisual materials or archives =====
- YouTube: A limited number of Lai Haraoba performances are available on YouTube. While the quality of these videos may vary, they provide a visual representation of the tradition. Searching for "Lai Haraoba performance" may help locate relevant content.
- Documentaries: Some documentaries that focus on the cultural heritage of Manipur may feature segments on Lai Haraoba. These documentaries typically explore Meitei culture, including dance traditions and rituals.

===== Discography and archives =====
- Field Recordings: Field recordings of Lai Haraoba rituals may exist, created by researchers or organizations focused on preserving Meitei culture. These recordings typically capture chanting, hymns, and instrumental music associated with the festival. These materials may be found through universities with South Asian studies programs or folklore archives in Manipur.
- Folklore Recordings: Recordings of Meitei folk music may include instruments or musical elements associated with Lai Haraoba. While these recordings are not specifically focused on the festival, they may offer insights into the musical traditions related to it.

=== Myanmar ===
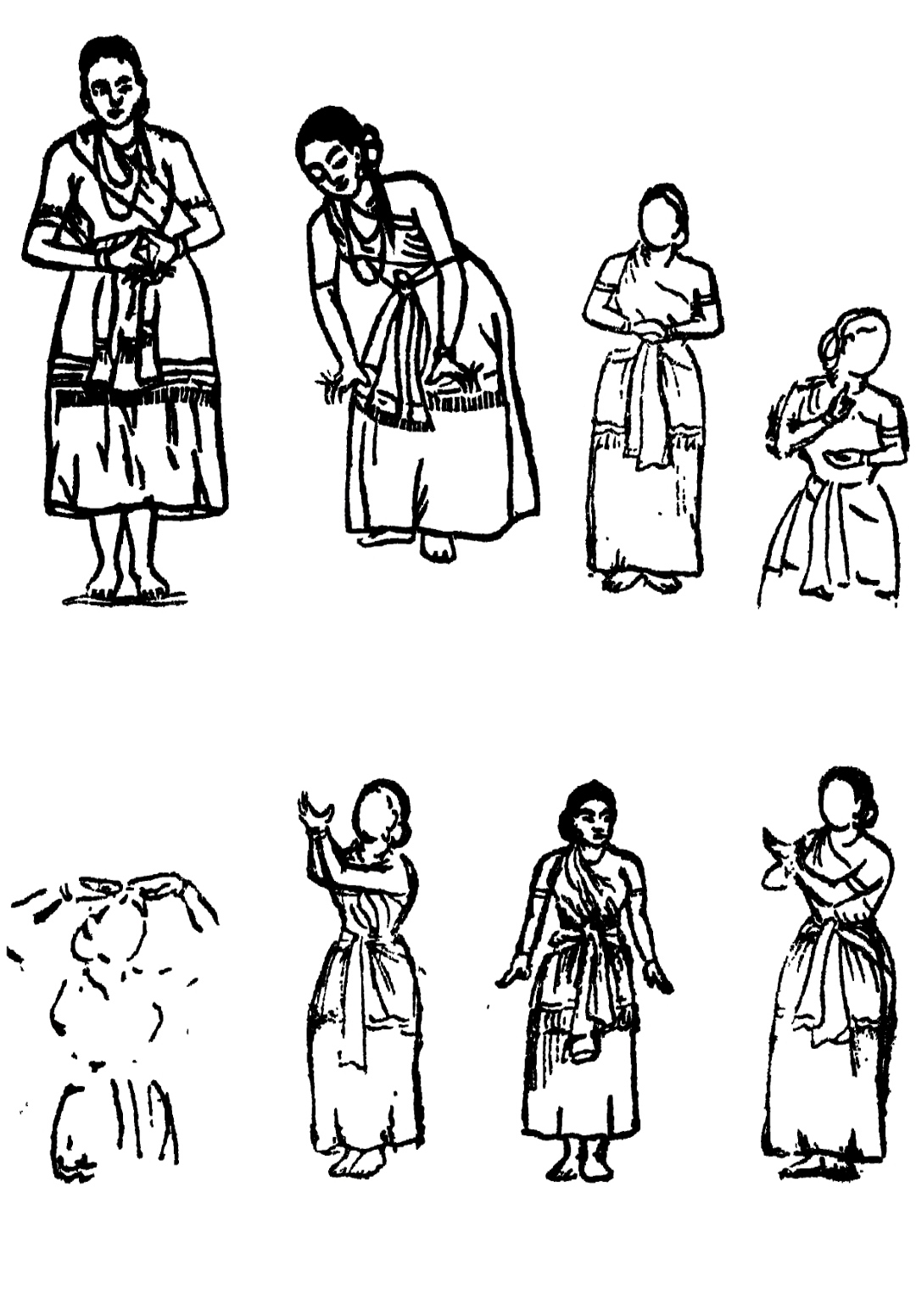
An illustration of different gestures of a holy and sacred dance form performed by a maibi (Meitei priestess) during the Lai Haraoba celebration

Lai Haraoba (Meitei: ꯂꯥꯏ ꯍꯔꯥꯎꯕ) is a traditional religious and cultural festival observed by the Meitei people in Myanmar, particularly among populations in Mandalay and Sagaing regions. Originating in Manipur, India, the festival has been maintained by Meitei descendants in Myanmar as part of their ancestral heritage. Lai Haraoba, which translates to "the merrymaking of the gods," involves ritual ceremonies, dance, music, and oral narratives that reflect Meitei cosmology and ancestral worship. The festival centers around the veneration of local deities known as Umang Lai and is typically led by priestesses (Maibi) who perform ritual dances and ceremonies. In Myanmar, Lai Haraoba functions as a cultural preservation practice among the Meitei diaspora, maintaining continuity with traditions from their historical homeland.

==== History in Myanmar ====
Approximately three centuries ago, a group of Meitei people were taken to Burma (present-day Myanmar) forcibly. During this period, Burmese Emperor Alaungpaya deployed Meitei cavalry units in military campaigns against Chiang Mai in the region now known as Thailand. These cavalry units were subsequently settled in Nandaswe, located in the Sagaing Division of Myanmar. The Meitei settlers established places of worship dedicated to their traditional deities and have continued to observe cultural and religious practices, including the Lai Haraoba festival.

According to Professor Bryce Grey Beemer, a Fulbright scholar from the University of Hawaii, the Meitei communities in Myanmar have integrated elements of local culture into their traditional practices. Despite this cultural assimilation, they have preserved core aspects of Meitei cultural identity. Notable among these are the continued observance of Lai Haraoba, a ritual festival dedicated to Meitei deities, and the worship of deities comparable to the goddess Panthoibi within the Sanamahi religious tradition.

==== Delegates from India ====
In 2008, the Indo-Myanmarese Fraternal Alliance, based in Imphal, undertook a 20-day visit to Myanmar with the objective of re-establishing historical and cultural connections between the Meitei populations of Manipur and Myanmar. A delegation comprising 20 members visited multiple settlements inhabited by individuals of Meitei descent. The visit was intended to facilitate cultural exchange and reinforce ties between the Meitei communities across the international border.

As part of cultural engagement efforts, R.K. Sivachandra Singh announced plans to participate in Lai Haraoba ceremonies in three locations: Nandaswe, Amarapura, and Garve. The observances include traditional rituals such as Lai Ikouba, a practice involving the invocation of deities from water. The initiative aims to support the continuation of Meitei cultural practices among diaspora communities in Myanmar. Singh further stated that the delegation would include performers, maibis (ritual priestesses), and the pena (musical instrument), a traditional stringed instrument, all of which are integral to the ceremonial proceedings.

==== In Mandalay Region ====
===== Honouring Yumjao Lairembi & other deities =====
In May 2007, a delegation from the Indo-Myanmar Fraternal Alliance travelled to Myanmar to participate in a series of Lai Haraoba festivals held in Meitei settlements across the country. According to an official statement issued by the Alliance, the team took part in the Lai Haraoba of the Meitei mother goddess Yumjao Lairembi at Garve village in Mandalay, commencing on 25 May. The delegation subsequently attended additional festivals dedicated to Meitei deities, including god Pakhangba in Amarapura, goddess Leimarel Sidabi, god Nongpok Ningthou, and goddess Panthoibi at Nandaswe village.

===== Honouring Leimarel Sidabi =====
The Lai Haraoba festival dedicated to the Meitei mother goddess Ema Leimarel Sidabi was observed in June 2024 at her shrine located in Amarapura Township, Mandalay Region, Myanmar. The ceremony included the ritual changing of the goddess's sacred garment.

According to a statement by Meikam Nanao Meitei, Organisation Secretary of the Federation of Indigenous People's Democratic Movement (FIDM), the event was attended by a significant number of Meitei devotees from the Mandalay Region. The religious observance was also attended by N. Ngangom Moirangcha, President of Eputhou Pakhangpa Lainingkol Mandalay, a member of FIDM, and a Central Executive Committee member of the MMDA.

===== Honouring Panthoibi =====
In October 2024, a religious program was held in Amarapura Township, Mandalay Region, Myanmar, to commemorate Ema Panthoibi, the Meitei goddess associated with the East. The event featured a religious gathering involving worship and the seeking of blessings from the deity. It was organised by the Meitei Kathe Indigenous Development Association (MIDA).

The purpose of the celebration was to promote the preservation and protection of the religious festivals observed by followers of the Sanamahi religion and members of the seven Meitei clans (Yek Salai/Meitei confederacy). The occasion marked the observance of Ema Panthoibi Haraoba, a variant of the Lai Haraoba festival dedicated specifically to the goddess Panthoibi.

==== In Sagaing Region ====
In May 2015, the traditional Meetei residents of Mozer Quarter in Sagaing Division, Myanmar, observed the Lai Haraoba festival at the shrine of Ima Leimarel Sidabi. The ceremony involved customary prayers and ritual offerings in accordance with long-established Meetei traditions. The event was attended by a large number of Meetei inhabitants from the surrounding area.

=== Tripura, India ===
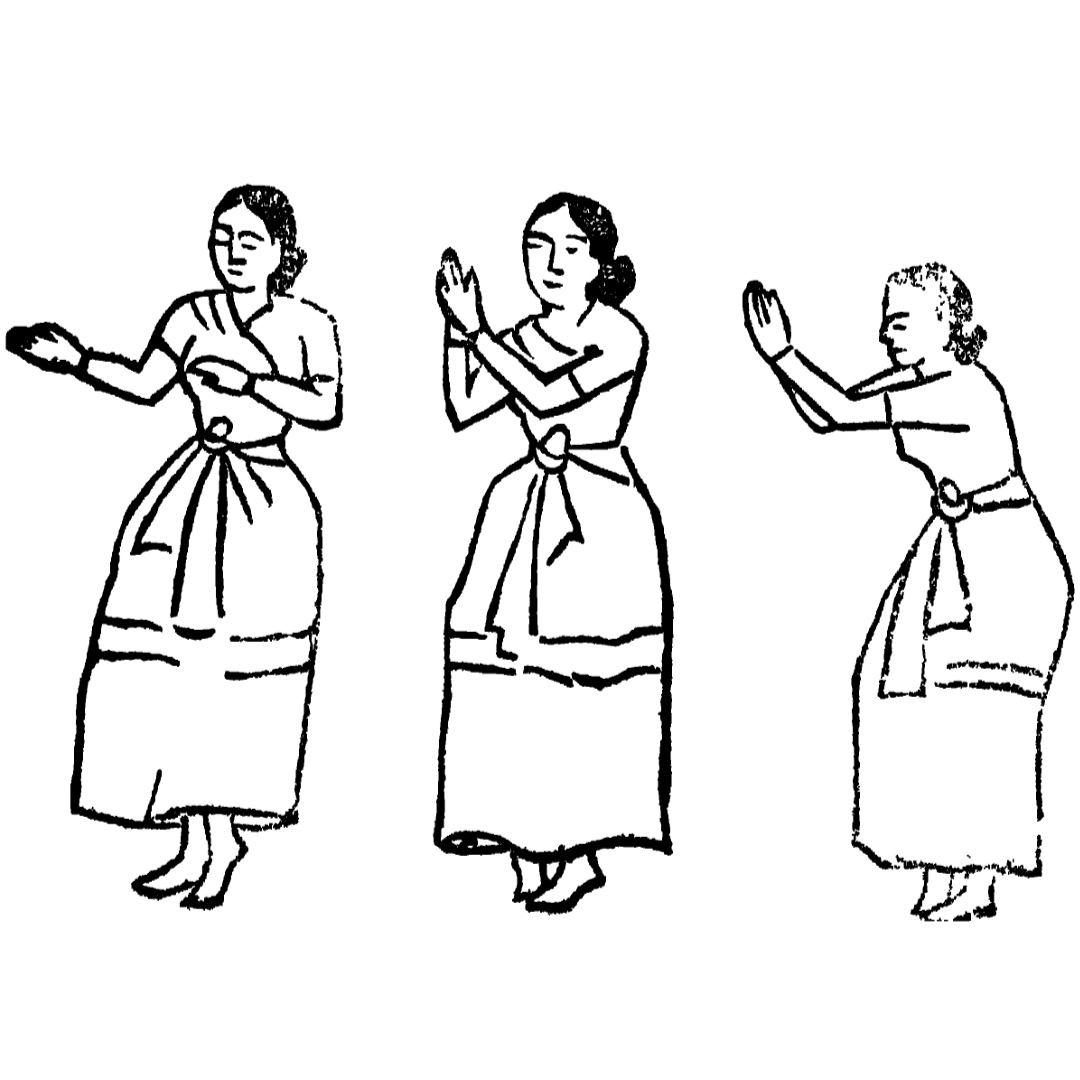
An illustration of a maibi (traditional Meitei priestess) performing different gestures of a holy and sacred dance in Lai Haraoba

Lai Haraoba (Meitei: ꯂꯥꯏ ꯍꯔꯥꯎꯕ, Bengali: লাই হরাওবা) is a traditional ritual Meitei festival observed by the Meitei people in Tripura, as well as in other regions of Northeast India. The name translates to "merrymaking of the gods" and the festival is primarily dedicated to the Umang Lai, or forest deities of Sanamahism, the traditional Meitei ethnic religion. It involves a series of ritualistic ceremonies, dances, music, and folk narratives that depict the creation of the universe according to Meitei cosmology. Lai Haraoba, being a Meitei intangible cultural heritage, serves both religious and cultural functions, preserving indigenous belief systems and performing arts. According to Biplab Kumar Deb, a Chief Minister of the Government of Tripura, the Lai Haraoba festival plays a role in strengthening the relationship between the Indian states of Manipur (since the time of erstwhile Kingdom of Manipur) and Tripura (since the time of erstwhile Kingdom of Tripura).

==== History in Tripura ====
Panganbam Chanu Rajeswari (ꯄꯥꯡꯒꯟꯕꯝ ꯆꯅꯨ ꯔꯥꯖꯦꯁ꯭ꯋꯔꯤ), also known as Kaboklei (ꯀꯕꯣꯛꯂꯩ), one of the Meitei queens of Tripura's King Birchandra Manikya (r. 1862–1896) and the mother of his successor, Radhakishore Manikya, introduced the Meitei religious festival Lai Haraoba (ꯂꯥꯏ ꯍꯔꯥꯎꯕ) in the Kingdom of Tripura for the first time. Besides, she commissioned the construction of a Meitei temple dedicated to the Meitei deity Lainingthou Pakhangba (ꯂꯥꯏꯅꯤꯡꯊꯧ ꯄꯥꯈꯪꯕ) at Banamalipur.

Tulshibati (ꯇꯨꯜꯁꯤꯕꯇꯤ), one of the Meitei queens of Tripura's King Radhakishore Manikya (r. 1896–1909) and daughter-in-law of Meitei Queen Mother Rajeswari, established a temple dedicated to the Meitei deity Lainingthou Puthiba (ꯂꯥꯏꯅꯤꯡꯊꯧ ꯄꯨꯊꯤꯕ) at Abhoynagar (also known as Abhaynagar) in Tripura. This site has since become the primary location for the celebration of the Lai Haraoba festival by the Meitei community in the region.

==== State holiday designation ====
In January 2015, the Government of Tripura designated "Meitei Umang Lai Haraoba" (ꯃꯩꯇꯩ ꯎꯃꯪ ꯂꯥꯏ ꯍꯔꯥꯎꯕ) as an official state festival, acknowledging its cultural significance within the state's diverse communities.

==== Duration ====
In Tripura, the Lai Haraoba festival is observed annually, typically spanning a duration of five days.

On 14 March 2022, a seven-day observance of the Lai Haraoba Festival commenced in the Bamutia block of Tripura. The festival was formally inaugurated by Member of parliament Rebati Tripura at the Erendhau Lamden Lairembi Temple (ꯏꯔꯦꯟꯙꯧ ꯂꯝꯗꯦꯟ ꯂꯥꯏꯔꯦꯝꯕꯤ ꯂꯥꯏꯁꯪ) in Bajalghat, located within the jurisdiction of the Bamutia block. The event was reported by the Directorate of Information and Cultural Affairs, Government of Tripura.

==== Revival ====
In January 2012, after nearly 40 years, the Meitei community in Agartala revived the celebration of the Lai Haraoba festival. Previously, the festival had been organised by the royal family (Manikya dynasty), but in this instance, it was organized by the local community. The event aimed to preserve cultural traditions and raise awareness of Meitei cultural heritage among the younger generation. It was noted that the festival served to promote peace and unity within the community.

For many participants, this was the first time experiencing the festival in Agartala. The celebration provided an opportunity to learn about traditional Meitei culture, with an emphasis on the importance of cultural awareness among youth. The revival of the festival contributed to reinforcing cultural identity and fostering a sense of community.

==== Worshipping deities in Tripura ====
- Erendhau Lamden Lairembi
- Ima Panthoibi
- Lainingthou Pakhangba
- Lainingthou Puthiba (also known as Ibudhou Puthiba or Iputhou Puthiba)

==== Assistance from Manipur ====
In 2014, a group of individuals and organizations from Manipur contributed financial assistance to restore items stolen from the shrine of the Meitei deity Lainingthou Puthiba in Tripura. The support was extended in preparation for the Lai Haraoba festival. Contributors included Pangamba Bobo of Yairipok Keithel, Soraisam Gopeshwore of Mekola, T. Mangibabu, Thiyam Dilip Meitei, a Zilla Parishad member from Nachou, K. Bante (Sub-Divisional Officer) of Moirang, the Democratic Students’ Alliance of Manipur (DESAM), International Modernised Academy of Konung Mamang, Pukhrabam Ingobi of Kongba Nandeibam Leikai, and Sanasam Bira, Member of Legislative Assembly from Kumbi.

On 23 May 2022, a delegation from the Lainingthou Sanamahi Temple Board (LSTB) of Imphal was dispatched to Dharmanagar, Tripura, to conduct the 'Ima Lairembi Lai Haraoba' festival, scheduled from 25 to 27 May. According to a statement issued by the LSTB, the festival was held in Dharmanagar and was organized by the Lainingthou Sanamahi Temple Board of Haying Khongbal Uphong Yumpham, in collaboration with Ima Panthoibi Haraoba Thougal Lup, Dharmanagar. The event aimed to revive a traditional religious observance that had not been practiced for approximately two centuries.

==== Organising groups ====
- Abhoynagar Puthiba Social Welfare and Cultural Society
- Department of Information and Cultural Affairs (ICA Department) of Government of Tripura
- Ima Panthoibi Haraoba Thougal Lup, Dharmanagar
- Lainingthou Sanamahi Temple Board (LSTB)
- Puthiba Lai Haraoba Committee
- Umang Lai Kanba Apunba Lup (UKAL) Manipur

==== Notable visitors ====
- Sanajaoba Leishemba, a member of the Royal family of Manipur (in January, 2023)
- Pratima Bhoumik, a Union Minister of State (MoS) (in January, 2023)
- Tinku Roy, a minister of Youth Affairs & Sports, Social Welfare & Social Education departments of the Government of Tripura (in December, 2023)
- Dipak Majumder, a Mayor of Agartala Municipal Corporation (AMC) (in December, 2023)
- Biplab Kumar Deb, a chief minister of Tripura (in January, 2022)
- Mevar Kumar Jamatia, a Tribal Welfare Minister of Tripura (in January, 2022)
- Rampada Jamatia, an MLA of Tripura (in January, 2021 & again in January, 2022)
- Rebati Mohan Das, a Speaker of State Legislative Assembly of Tripura (in January, 2020)
- Jitendra Chowdhury, an MP of Tripura (in December, 2017)
- Sudip Barman, an MLA of Tripura (in December, 2017)

=== Kwatha village, Tengnoupal district, Manipur, India ===
Lai Haraoba in Kwatha
- Symbol of traditional Meitei religion (Sanamahism)
- Status: active
- Genre: Meitei festival
- Frequency: Annual
- Venue: Kwatha village
- Locations: Kwatha, Manipur
- Country: India
- Participants: Meitei people and Assam Rifles
- Attendance: more than 1000
- Capacity: more than 1000
- People: Meitei people
- Member: Meitei people

Lai Haraoba (ꯂꯥꯏ ꯍꯔꯥꯎꯕ) in Kwatha village is a traditional Meitei festival that celebrates the creation myths and ancestral Meitei deities of the Meitei community. The festival involves ritual dances, music, and ceremonies that honor traditional deities and reflect the Meitei intangible cultural heritage. It plays a significant role in preserving the customs and beliefs of the people in Kwatha village. Kwatha's Lai Haraoba belongs to the category of Chakpa Haraoba, which is specific to certain indigenous groups within the region.

==== Background ====
Kwatha is a historic Meitei village located in the hills of Manipur, near Moreh, along the India–Myanmar border. It is the only ancient Meitei-inhabited village in the hill areas of Manipur.

==== Worshiping deities ====
Lai Haraoba in Kwatha is specifically dedicated to Meitei deities, Nongpok Ningthou (ꯅꯣꯡꯄꯣꯛ ꯅꯤꯡꯊꯧ) and Panthoibi (ꯄꯥꯟꯊꯣꯏꯕꯤ).

==== Celebration ====
In 2013, the Lai Haraoba festival was celebrated again in Kwatha village after a two-year break. The festival lasted for five days and concluded on 27 May 2013. This traditional event is one of the most important and widely recognized festivals among the Meitei community.

==== Participation ====
In 2013, despite heavy rain and poor road access, more than a thousand devotees from across Manipur and other places participated in the celebrations.

In May 2021, the Tengnoupal Battalion of the Assam Rifles, under IGAR (South), helped the people of Kwatha village celebrate the Lai Haraoba festival. During the event, villagers and Assam Rifles soldiers prayed together at the village temple. Because of COVID-19, only a small number of people joined the celebration. Everyone followed COVID-19 safety rules, said the Assam Rifles. At the end, the Assam Rifles gave food and snacks to the villagers. The village chief thanked them for their help and asked them to keep supporting the village in the future.

In April 2025, the Assam Rifles took part in the Lai Haraoba festival in Kwatha village. According to the Public Relations Officer of IGAR (South), more than 100 local people, including children, joined the event with great excitement. The festival was full of traditional dances, prayers, and a strong sense of community and culture. Devotees also came from nearby places like Moreh and Imphal to take part in the celebration.

==== Study tour programs ====
During the Lai Haraoba festival in Kwatha, a three-day study tour was held from May 25 to 27, 1995, for the final year students of the Dance Diploma course, by the Ministry of Human Resource Development. This annual tour allows students to experience and learn about the festival firsthand as part of their final year curriculum. The same was done in 2009.

==== Organizers and supporters ====
In 2013, the festival was organized by the "Kwatha Nongpok Ningthou & Panthoibi Erat Thouram Committee" in collaboration with the Kwatha Village Authorities. They expressed their thanks to the 24 Assam Rifles of 26 Sector AR for their support and assistance in ensuring the smooth conduct of the festival.

In May 2022, Keirao MLA Lourembam Rameshwar and members of the group SPPM (Salaicha Pibarel Punsi Marup) went to Kwatha village. They prayed at the holy places of Nongpok Ningthou and Nongpok Panthoibi Chaningkhombi. The MLA also gave money to help the villagers with the Lai Haraoba festival, as it had become costly to hold.

== Gallery ==
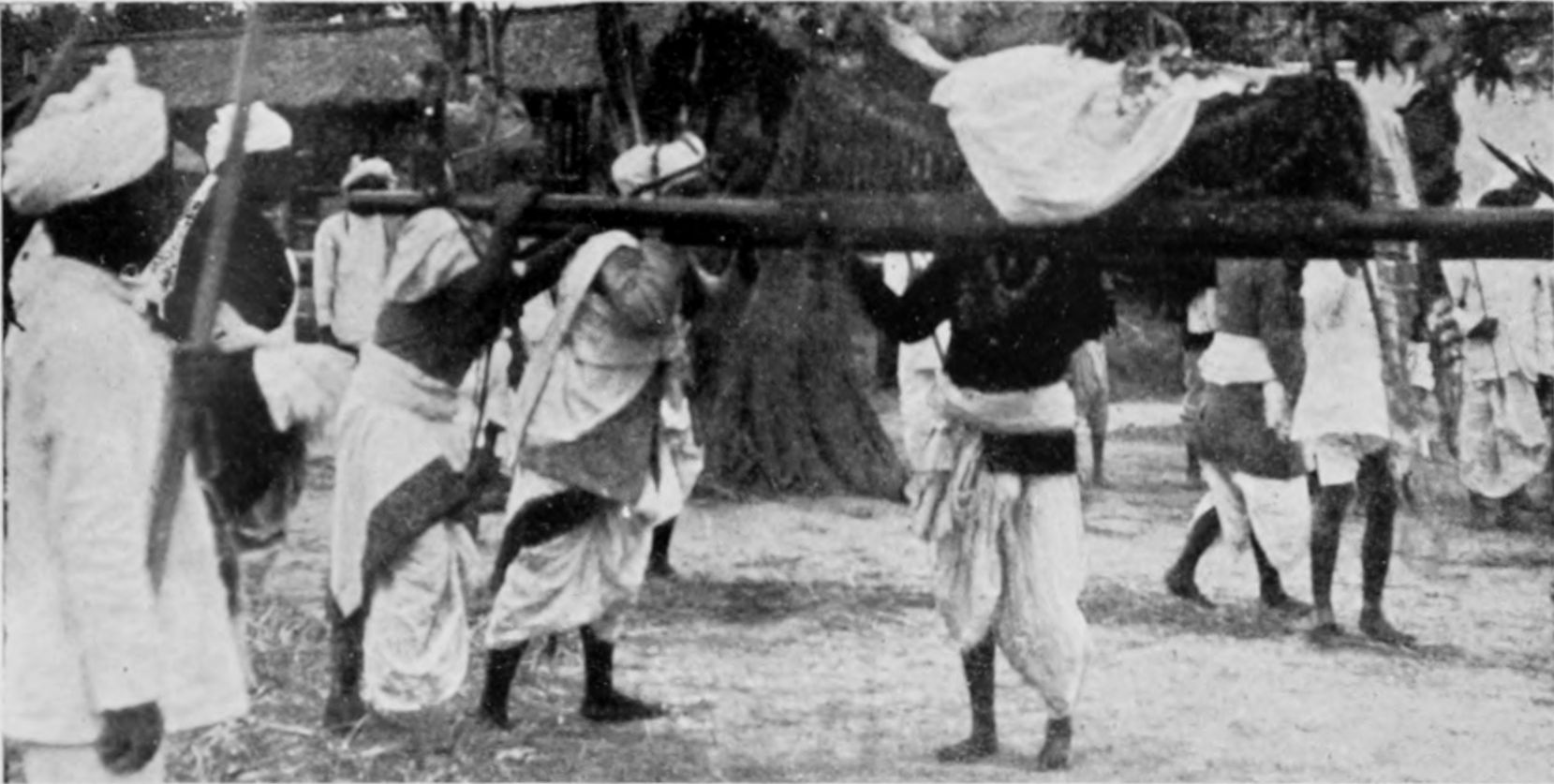

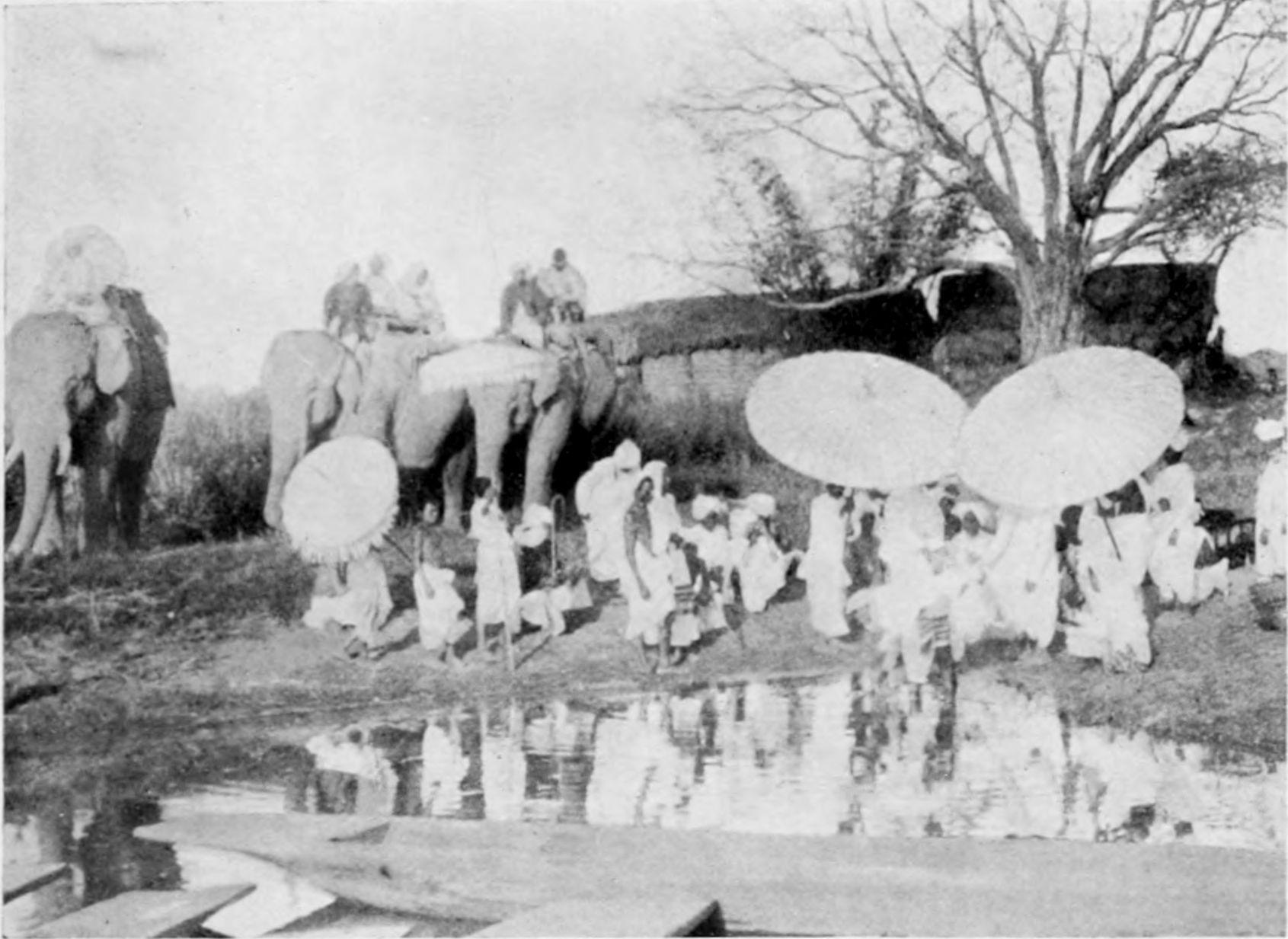

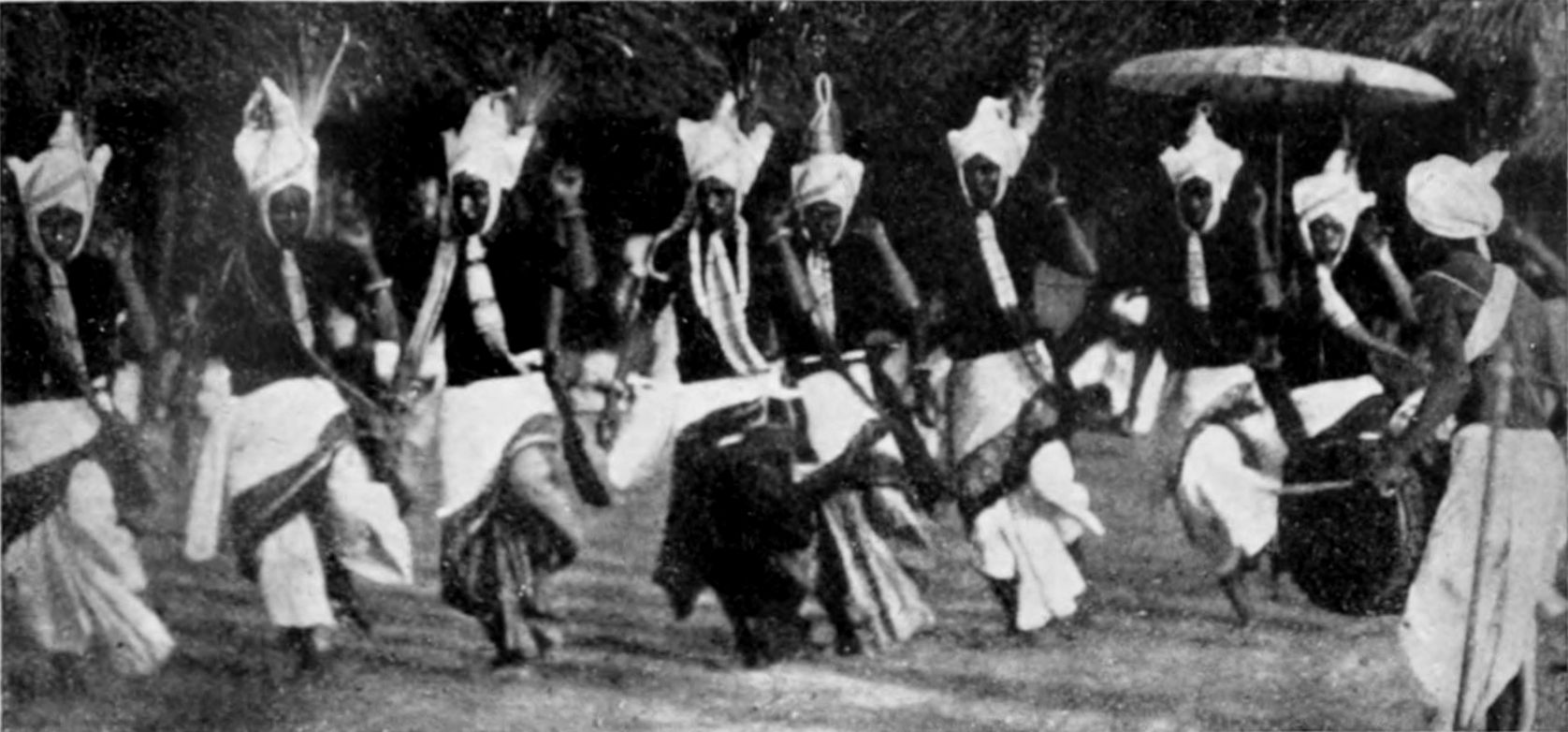

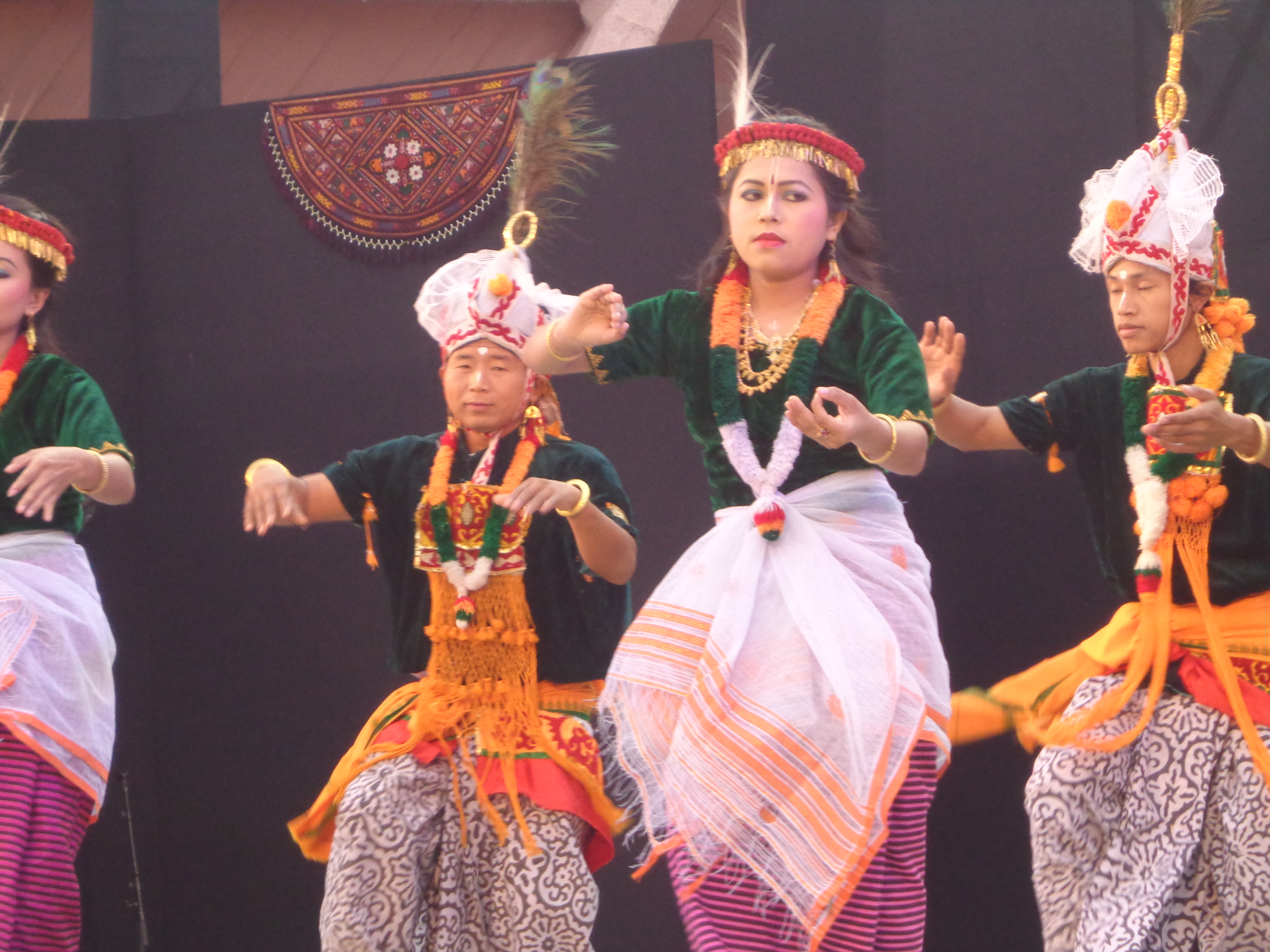

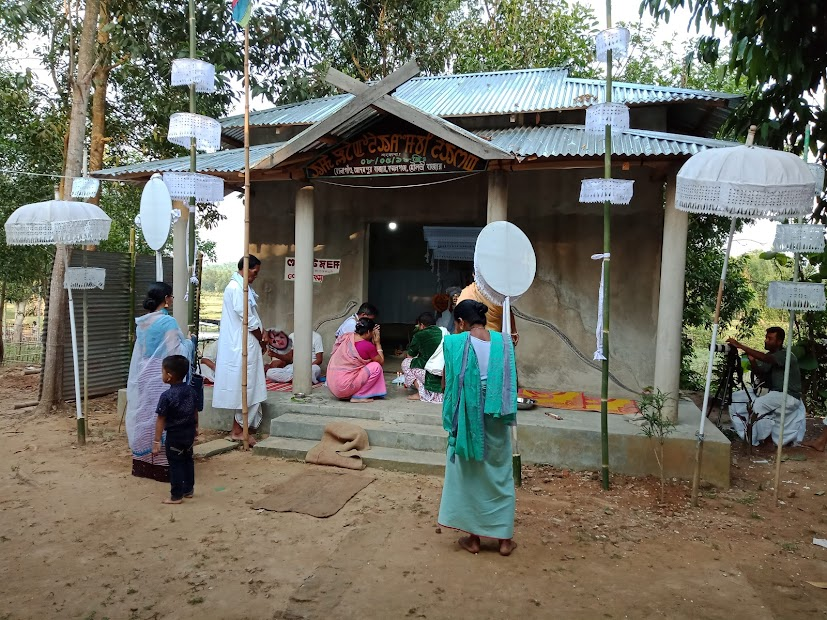

== See also ==
- Khamba Thoibi
  - Lei Langba (Khamba Thoibi)
- Lists of deities in Sanamahism
- Sanamahi creation myth
- Meitei people in Assam
- Meitei people in Bangladesh
- Meitei people in Meghalaya
- Meitei people in Myanmar
- Meitei people in Tripura
- Cheibi
- Huiyen Lallong
- Sarit Sarak
- Thang Ta
- Meitei language in Bangladesh
- Meitei monuments in Bangladesh
- Meitei clothing in Myanmar
- Burmese–Meitei relations
- Meitei–Shan relations
- Manipuri Literary and Cultural Forum
- Meitei language in Tripura
- Takhel Ngamba
- Kwatha Pham Kaaba
- Kwatha Khunou
- Meitei ritual songs
- Ancient Meitei hymns

== Bibliography ==
- Arambam, Lokendro. 2002. ‘Some Aspects of Kanglei Lai Haraoba’, in Traditional Customs and Rituals of North-East India, Vol. 1, ed. P.C. Sharma. Guwahati: Vivekananda Kendra Institute of Culture.
- Brara, N. Vijayalakshmi, 1998. Politics, society and cosmology in India’s North East. Delhi: Oxford University Press.
- Chaki-Sircar, Manjusri, 1984. Feminism in a traditional society: women of the Manipur valley. Delhi: Shakti Books.
- Chatterji, Suniti Kumar. 1974. Kirata-Jana-Kriti: The Indo-Mongoloids, their Contribution to the History and Culture of India. Calcutta: Calcutta Asiatic Society.
- Levi-Strauss, Claude. 1970. The Raw and the Cooked. tr. Weightman, J. & Weightman, D. London: Jonathan Cate.
- Parratt, S.N. 1980. The Religion of Manipur. Calcutta: Firma KLM (Pvt.) Limited.
- Parratt, S.N. and J. Parratt. 1997. The Pleasing of the Gods: Meitei Lai Haraoba. New Delhi: Vikas Publishing House Pvt. Ltd.
- Sanajaoba, N. (ed.). 1991. Manipur: Past and present – the ordeals of and heritage of a civilization, Vol. 2. New Delhi: Mittal Publications.
- Shakespeare, J. 1913. ‘The Pleasing of the God Thangjing’. Man. XIII.1:112.
- Singh, E.Nilakanta. 1982. Aspects of Indian Culture. Imphal: Jawaharlal Nehru Manipur Dance Academy.
- Singh, E.N. 1997. Manipuri Dance. New Delhi: Omsons Publications.
- Singh, Kh. Ratan. 2001. Lai Haraoba of Manipur: Indigenous Festival of the Meitei (A Social-Historical Perspective). Manipur: Smt. Pratima Devi
- Singh, L. Bhagyachandra. 1987. A Critical Study of the Religious Philosophy of the Meitei Before the Advent of Vaishnavism in Manipur. Manipur: L. Momon Devi
- Singh, W. Lukhoi. 2008. Lai Haraoba. Manipur: author
- Kshetrimayum, Otojit. (2014). Ritual, Politics and Power in North East India: Contexualising the Lai Haraoba of Manipur. New Delhi: Ruby Press & Co.
- Parratt, Saroj Nalini; John Parratt (1997). The Pleasing of the Gods: Meitei Lai Haraoba. Vikas Publishing House.
