= Pratapgarh =

Pratapgarh or Partabgarh may refer to the following places in India:

== States, cities and towns ==
- Pratapgarh, Rajasthan, formerly eponymous capital of
  - Pratapgarh State, a Rajputana princely state
- Pratapgarh, Uttar Pradesh, city
- Pratapgarh, Tripura
- Pratapgarh Kingdom, a medieval kingdom in what is now north-east India and Bangladesh

== Constituencies ==
- Pratapgarh (Lok Sabha constituency), a parliamentary constituency in Uttar Pradesh

=== State Assembly constituencies ===
- Pratapgarh (Assembly constituency) of Uttar Pradesh
- Pratapgarh (Vidhan Sabha constituency) of Tripura
- Pratapgarh (Rajasthan Assembly constituency) of Rajasthan

== Districts ==
- Pratapgarh district, Rajasthan
- Pratapgarh district, Uttar Pradesh

== Other places ==
- Pratapgad, a fort in Satara district, Maharashtra
- Pratapgarh Estate, Taluqdari Estate in Oudh

== Other uses ==
- Battle of Pratapgarh

== See also ==
- Bela Pratapgarh, Uttar Pradesh
- Pratapgarh Assembly constituency (disambiguation)
