= Pratapgarh Assembly constituency =

Pratapgarh Assembly constituency may refer to

- Pratapgarh, Rajasthan Assembly constituency
- Pratapgarh, Tripura Assembly constituency
- Pratapgarh, Uttar Pradesh Assembly constituency

== See also ==
- Pratapgarh (disambiguation)
