= Manisankar Murasingh =

Indian cricketer (born 1993)

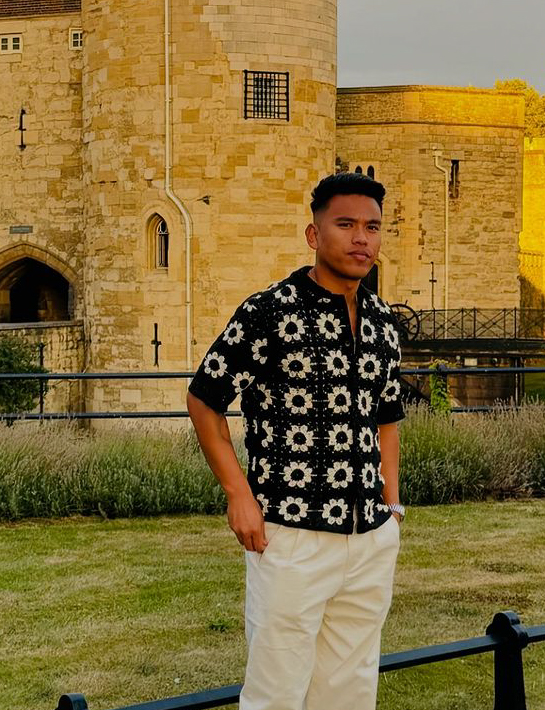
- Murasingh in 2024

Personal information
- Full name: Manisankar Bhagyamani Murasingh
- Born: 1 January 1993 (age 33); Abhoynagar, Agartala, Tripura, India
- Batting: Left-handed
- Bowling: Right-arm medium
- Role: Bowling all rounder

Domestic team information
- Years: Team
- 2009–present: Tripura
- 2024–present: Philadelphia

Career statistics
Competition	FC	LA	T20
Matches	46	24	22
Runs scored	2103	443	223
Batting average	26.96	22.15	13.93
100s/50s	2/9	0/1	0/0
Top score	150	66	38
Balls bowled	7813	1051	445
Wickets	116	22	18
Bowling average	35.99	38.18	30.83
5 wickets in innings	3	0	0
10 wickets in match	0	0	0
Best bowling	5/70	4/60	4/32
Catches/stumpings	14/0	2/0	4/0
- Source: CricketArchive, 21 December 2016

Manisankar Murasingh (born 1 January 1993) is an Indian cricketer who plays for Tripura. He was the leading wicket-taker for Tripura in the 2018–19 Ranji Trophy, with 32 dismissals in eight matches.

== Honours ==
Lala Amarnath Award- Best All Rounder Ranji Trophy 2019-2020
