= Ramu Das =

Indian politician

Member of the Tripura Legislative Assembly
- Incumbent
- Assumed office 2023
- Preceded by: Rebati Mohan Das
- Constituency: Pratapgarh
- In office 2015–2018
- Preceded by: Anil Sarkar
- Succeeded by: Rebati Mohan Das
- Constituency: Pratapgarh

Personal details
- Born: 3 February 1980 (age 46)
- Party: Communist Party of India (Marxist)
- Parent: Sudhan Das (Father)
- Education: M.A (Political Science)
- Alma mater: Tripura University

Ramu Das is an Indian politician currently serving as a Member of the 13th Tripura Legislative Assembly, representing the Pratapgarh constituency. He is a member of the Communist Party of India (Marxist) from Tripura.

Ramu Das was elected as Member of Tripura Legislative Assembly in a 2015 by-election from the Pratapgarh constituency. In the 2018 Tripura Legislative Assembly election, he lost to the BJP candidate Rebati Mohan Das, but was re-elected in the 2023 Legislative Assembly election.
