= Puthiba =

Meitei deity

- Member of Lainingthou deities, Umang Lai deities
- Symbol of traditional Meitei religion
- Other names: Lainingthou Puthiba, Iputhou Puthiba, Ibudhou Puthiba
- Meitei: ꯄꯨꯊꯤꯕ
- Affiliation: traditional Meitei religion (Sanamahism)
- Adherents: Meitei people
- Texts: PuYas
- Gender: male
- Region: Manipur and Tripura
- Ethnic group: Meitei ethnicity
- Festivals: Lai Haraoba

Puthiba (Meitei: ꯄꯨꯊꯤꯕ), also known as Lai Puthiba, (Note: written in the native Meitei Mayek script as "ꯂꯥꯏ ꯄꯨꯊꯤꯕ".) Lainingthou Puthiba, (Note: written in the native Meitei Mayek script as "ꯂꯥꯏꯅꯤꯡꯊꯧ ꯄꯨꯊꯤꯕ".) Iputhou Puthiba, (Note: written in the native Meitei Mayek script as "ꯏꯄꯨꯊꯧ ꯄꯨꯊꯤꯕ".) Ibudhou Puthiba, (Note: written in the native Meitei Mayek script as "ꯏꯕꯨꯙꯧ ꯄꯨꯊꯤꯕ".) is a deity of traditional Meitei religion, mainly worshipped in the Indian states of Manipur and Tripura. He is one of the most important traditional Meitei deities, honored by the Meitei people in Tripura. He is one of the Umang Lai deities in the Meitei pantheon.

"Puthiba" is also another name of god Khoriphaba, who is another Meitei deity.

== History ==
According to the Loiyumpa Silyel, an 11th-12th century Meitei language written Constitution, god Puthiba was used to be worshipped by the Meitei people of the "Puthem" family.

In 1684, a ritual dedicated to God Lai Puthiba was conducted at ancestral shrines in times of insufficient rainfall, rituals.

During the reign of Meitei king Marjit Singh of Manipur Kingdom (1813–1819), Meitei princess Sija Chandrakala Devi married Tripuri king Raja Borothakur Krishnakishwor, becoming his first queen. During her tenure, the shrine of the god Puthiba was established at Abhoinagar in Tripura, alongside the construction of several other Meitei temples in the region.

== Cult ==
Puthiba is an Umang Lai deity worshipped in the Phayeng region of Manipur. The local community observes the Lai Haraoba festival dedicated to Puthiba during the Meitei lunar month of Hiyangei (November–December). This is distinct from the Lai Haraoba held in the month of Mera (October–November), which is dedicated to the deity Koubru.

Puthiba is a deity venerated in times of insufficient rainfall, rituals were performed to seek divine intervention.

He is worshipped with the intention of seeking protection for cattle from natural calamities. Following the observance of a ritual, cattle owners customarily refrain from allowing their livestock to roam freely within the village.

== Festivals ==
In January 2022, the five-day Laining-thou Puthiba Lai Haraoba festival concluded at Puthiba Devata Bari in Abhoynagar, Agartala. The closing ceremony was attended by Biplab Kumar Deb, a Chief Minister of Tripura, and Mevar Kumar Jamatia, a Tribal Welfare Minister. The event was organized by the Puthiba Lai Haraoba Committee. During the event, Chief Minister Biplab Kumar Deb and Tribal Welfare Minister Mevar Kumar Jamatia noted the historical and cultural connections and relationship between the Indian states of Manipur (since the time of erstwhile Kingdom of Manipur) and Tripura (since the time of erstwhile Kingdom of Tripura), stating that festivals such as Laining-thou Puthiba Lai Haraoba serve to reinforce inter-state relations.

== See also ==
- Poireiton
- Panam Ningthou
- Ningthou Puthiba
- Pureiromba
