= Anil Sarkar =

Indian politician

- Born: 1 September 1939; Comilla District, Undivided Bengal (now in Bangladesh)
- Died: 11 February 2015 (aged 75)

Anil Sarkar (1 September 1939 - 11 February 2015) was an Indian politician and member of the Communist Party of India (Marxist). He was a nine-term member of the Tripura Legislative Assembly representing the Pratapgarh assembly constituency.

== Political career ==
Sarkar completed his post-graduate studies in the Bengali language at Calcutta University, West Bengal. In 1956 he joined the Communist Party of India and later in 1964, when the Communist Party of India (Marxist) was established, he joined the CPI(M).

A staunch Communist, Sarkar was first elected to the Tripura Legislative Assembly from the Teliamura (Vidhan Sabha constituency) in 1972 on a Communist Party of India (Marxist) ticket, defeating his opponent Bir Chandra Barman by about 1600 votes. In the 1977 assembly election Sarkar changed his constituency to the Pratapgarh (Vidhan Sabha constituency) and won against the Indian National Congress candidate Madhusudan Das by about 7500 votes.

In the 1983 election Sarkar again defeated Madhusudan Das from the INC by about 5000 votes. In the 1988 assembly election, Sarkar again took on the Indian National Congress' Madhusudan Das, whom he had defeated in the 1977 and 1983 election. The result was the same and Sarkar won by a margin of about 2500 votes. By the time the 1993 assembly election took place, Sarkar was already a four-term MLA and again defeated Congress' Madhusudan Das by about 7000 votes.

In the 1998, 2003, and 2008 Tripura assembly elections, Sarkar held the seat defeating Narayan Das and Bimal Chandra Barman of the Indian National Congress. The 2013 election was his last; he defeated Ranjit Kumar Das of the Indian National Congress by a margin of about 2000 votes.

== Personal life ==
Sarkar was an acclaimed poet, writer, and intellectual. He authored 24 books and received numerous literary awards. In 1971, he was credited with helping provide relief and shelter in Tripura to hundreds of thousands of refugees fleeing from the Bangladesh Liberation War. He and his wife had a son.

Sarkar died on 11 February 2015 after a long illness.
