= Rebati Mohan Das =

Indian politician

Member of the Tripura Legislative Assembly
- In office 2018–2023
- Preceded by: Ramu Das
- Succeeded by: Ramu Das
- Constituency: Pratapgarh

Speaker of the Tripura Legislative Assembly
- In office 2018–2021
- Preceded by: Ramendra Chandra Debnath
- Succeeded by: Ratan Chakraborty

Personal details
- Born: Tripura, India
- Party: Bharatiya Janata Party
- Occupation: Politician

Rebati Mohan Das is an Indian politician from Bharatiya Janata Party and a former member of the Tripura Legislative Assembly. Das was the speaker of the Tripura Legislative Assembly, until his resignation in September 2021.
