= Umang Lai =

Traditional Meitei deities

- forest deities
- Member of traditional Meitei deities
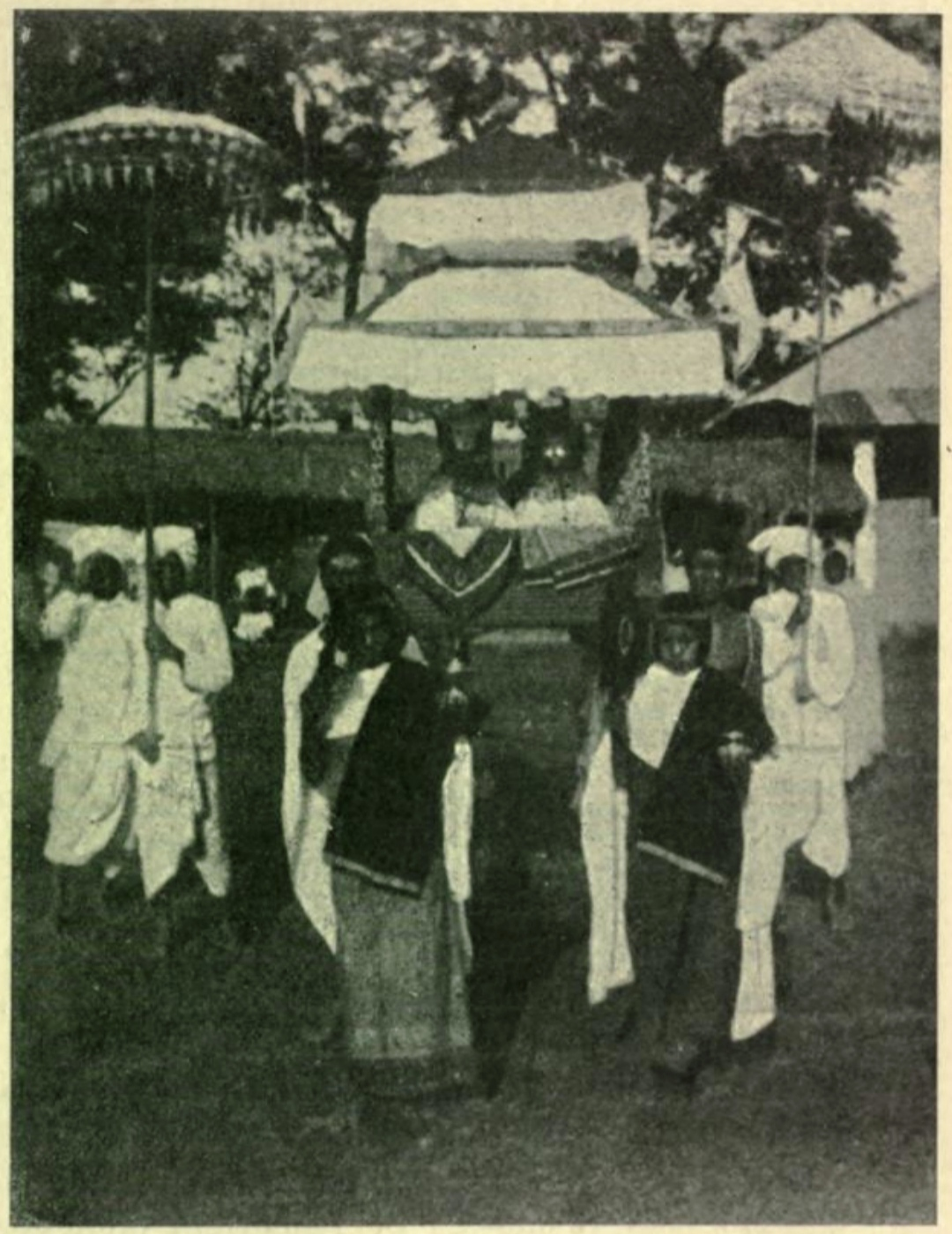
- Idols of Nongshaba, who is considered as the greatest of the Umang Lai deities, and his spouse, being carried on a palanquin, by devotees
- Meitei: ꯎꯃꯪ ꯂꯥꯏ
- Affiliation: traditional Meitei religion (Sanamahism)
- Major cult center: sacred groves
- Abode: sacred groves
- Adherents: Meitei people
- Gender: both
- Region: India; Bangladesh; Myanmar
- Ethnic group: Meitei ethnicity
- Festivals: Lai Haraoba

A sacred grove at Wangoo village in Manipur

Umang Lai (Meitei: /ū-mang lāi/) refers to a group of ancient Meitei deities of the traditional Meitei religion (Sanamahism) who are worshipped as the local guardians of particular areas, especially sacred groves. These deities are worshipped annually. Their sacred groves are preserved by the Meitei people since ancient times, mostly in the Northeast Indian state of Manipur. Their pleasing ceremony is always celebrated every year through a music and dance festival, known as Lai Haraoba. There are more than 365 Umang Lai shrines in Manipur state alone. They are integral parts of Meitei mythology, folklore and religion. The cults of these deities vary from community to community.

== Etymology ==
"Umang" means "forest" and "Lai" means "deity" in Meitei language (also known as Manipuri language).

== List of deities ==
Umang Lai sacred groves are widely distributed in Imphal East, Imphal West, Thoubal, Kakching and Bishnupur districts of Manipur. The following is the list:

Names of deities (prefixed by the locations of their shrines)	Note(s)
Moirang Thangjing	
Heingang Marjing	
Sugnu Wangbarel	
Awang Sekmai Koubru	
Yaiskul Nongsaba	
Sugnu Lokningthou	
Sugnu Sanamahi	
Thanga Chingningthou	
Koirengei Pakhangba	
Maibamlokpaching Loyarakpa	
Top Chingkha Inamung	
Yairipok nongpok Panthoibi	
Kodompokpi Sorarel	
Yurembam Unam Sorarel	
Yambem Yairi Ningthou	
Tairenpokpi Koubru	
Phaknung Chingkhei	
Awang Yumnam Khunou Puthiba	
Khurai Puthiba	
Wangu Wangbarel	
Ningel Nongpok	
Chandrakhong Yenkhurakpa	
Andro Panam Ningthou	
Andro Pureiromba	
Tangjeng Lokningthou	
Nungu Lokningthou	
Phayeng Koubru	
Nachou Sorarel	
Kha Potsangbam Panganba	
Ningthoukhong Oknarel	
Eething Thangjing	
Oinam Nongsaba	
Haobijam Chairellakpa	
Laishram Eereima	
Moirangthem Thangjing	
Tongbram Lairemma	
Salam Sorarel, Sanahal	
Heisnam Chingningthou	
Ngangkha Lawai Thangjing	
Maibram Tampak Lainingthou	
Laishangbam Nongsaba	
Philem Khoriphaba	
Laiphrakpam Khaanachaoba	
Khoyangbam Ayangleima	
Phairelbam Loklaoleima	
Ahanthem Sanamahi	
Mairenbam Leikoi Ningthou	
Kumam Maharaba	
Hemam Pakhangba	
Konjengbam Sorarel	
Kiyam Ui Ningthou	
Thongam Thongnang Ningthou	
Kumphi Santhong Ningthou	
Sagang Santhong Ningthou	
Kodompokpi Khoriphaba	
Patsoi Khunjao Pakhangba	
Patsoi Khunou Nongkabi	
Shachep Chingkhei Puri-Puraba	
Ukhongshang Nongpok	
Uyal Arong Ningthou	
Khoirom Nongpok Ningthou	
Kharam Pakhangba	
Oinam Tangleihada Eereima	
Oinam Laipham Eereima	
Oinam Thingel Eereima	
Lamdeng Laikhurembi	
Lambal Koubru	
Changangei Khubomba	
Sharotkhaibam Phouoibi	
Wangkhei Laishram Eereima	
Wangjing Ningthou	
Lairen Sajik Koubru	
Tentha Eekop Ningthou	
Thoudam Eerong Leima	
Khurai Konsam Leikai Chingjroibi	
Lamsang Eshing Chaiba	
Utlou Panthoibi	
Kiyamgei Pakhangba	
Chingamakha Soram Yumjao Lairemma	
Malom Khunjaoba	
Thoubal Sabal Tongba Thouban Ningthou	
Haoga Sorarel	
Kontha Marjing	
Phumlou Keiroi Koubru	
Phumlou Siphai Koubru	
Haoreibi Pakhangba	
Sarangthem Lairemma	
Leisangthem Lairemma	
Heikrujam Loiyarakpa	
Leimapokpam Siphai Thangjing	
Leimapokpam Khunpham Sebu Leima	
Aarapti Pureiromba	
Awang Potsangbam Koubru	
Angom Yumjao Leima	
Langpok Ningthou	
Kangabam Yumjao Leima	
Potsangbam Thouriphi Koubru	
Keisampat Yumjao Leima	
Taobungkhok Loiyarakpa	
Pishum Huidrom Yumjao Leima	
Kairang Marjing	
Loitangkhunou Koubru	
Haorang Sabal Koubru	
Haorang Keirel Koubru	
Moitangpok Korouhanba	
Lamlai Pureiromba	
Yurembam Huidon Pokpi	
Wangoi Sanamahi	
Wangoi Wangbarel	
Patsoi Taomang Naothingkhong	
Patsoi Nongabi	
Chingamakha Eerom Yumjao Leima	
Sanjenbam Koubru	
Lamangdong Yangoi Ningthou	
Kwasiphai Pakhangba	
Thiyam Konjin Phunan Ningthou	
Kakching Khullen Khamlangba	
Kakching Khullen Naohal	
Kakching Khullen Eerum Ningthou	
Kakching Khullen Sekmai Ningthou	
Kakching Khoriphaba	
Wairi Khamlangba	
Arapti Eereima	
Eerengpal Eerum Ningthou	
Paonam Eeshing Chaiba	
Toubul Yangoi Ningthou	
Kangamung Khujoi Loiyarakpa	
Ngairangbam Loiyarakpa	
Waiton Puthiba	
Khundrakpam Marjing	
Tingri Marjing	
Sapam Solai Khongjom Ningthou	
Shalungpham Eekop Ningthou	
Thoubal Nonggangkhong Thoubal Ningthou	
Kekru Nongpok Panthoibi	
Chabung company Wangbrel	
Eeram Siphai Ngangourakpa	
Mutum Phiphou Eerong Leima	
Kakwa Naorem Panthoibi	
Iroisemba Thongamacha	
Naran Konjing Koubru	
Mayang Imphal Khuman Pokpa	
Lairenjam Lairemma	
Thangbijrou Thangba	
Meitram Shebu Leima	
Shagol Tongba Pakhangba	
Keinou Khulleima	
Thogam Mondung Khulleima	
Samram Khongjom Ningthou	
Lourembam Lairemma	
Konjengbam Lairemma	
Top Langmai Leima	
Thongam Panganba	
Thaoroijam Yumjao Leima	
Uripok Yurembam Huidom Pokpi	
Elangbam Panganba	
Mayengbam Yaoreibi	
Mayang Langjing Mamang Koubru	
Mayang Langjing Maning Koubru	
Langmeithet Panthoibi	
Khumbong Panthoibi	
Awang khunou Koubru	
Phoijing Chaning Leima	
Taothong Koubru	
Uripok Khamlangba	
Akham Khamlangba	
Uripok Laikhurembi	
Elangbam Khanapokpi Pangamba	
Luker Khoimom Lairemma	
Lamboikhul Eereima	
Govindagram Puthiba	
Khonghampat Luwangpokpa	
Khonghampat Koubru	
Parnam Khul Loiyarakpa	
Ngariyanbam Koubru	
Nambol Khoriphaba	
Phoukakchao Phouoibi	
Kha Thounaojam Panthoibi	
Uchekol Moriba	
Nambol Konkham Loiyarakpa	
Khundrakpam Panganba	
Meinam Lairemma	
Achanbigei Marjing	
Kangamung Maisnam Loiyarakpa	
Keirao Langdum Keirao Lakpa	
Wahengbam Yumjao Leima	
Tekcham Eekop Ningthou	
Langmeidomg Pakhangba	
Eengourok Nongpok Ningthou	
Heinoupok Loiyarakpa	
Chingamakha Maisnam Luwangpokpa	
Pukhao Ahallup Eereima	
Khurai Lai Awangba	
Wangbal Eekop Ningthou	
Hiyangthang Lairemma	
Huirem Chingbal Leima	
Naharup Pureiromba	
Pungdongbam Panthoibi	
Nungoi Puthiba	
Sagolband Pakhangba	
Lamding Wangjing	
Chingtham Khongjom Ningthou	
Ningthoukhong Thangnarel	
Yumnam Yumjao Lairemma	
Sagolmang Eereima	
Patpal Eerum Ningthou	
Nungu Laimanai	
Charangpat Mamang Arong Ningthou	
Khangabok Eekop Ningthou	
Pengi Arong Ningthou	
Moirangpurel Pashi Lairemma	
Pourabi Puthiba	
Khwai Lainingthouhanba	
Loktonbam Arai Leima	
Nakalbam Chingol Ningthou	
Khurai Mamang Yangoi Ningthou	
Khurai Angouba	
Khurai Puthiba	
Shoubol Lairemma	
Top Langmai Leima	
Sekta Laiyingthou Achangba	
Khangkhui	
Khurai Ningthem Pokpa	
Angom Pokpa (Leithong)	
Aton Khuman Pakhangba Ningthem Pokpa	
Lamdeng Thumkhong Lairemma	
Lamdeng Poireiton Laikhurembi Leima Leinaotabi	
Luwang Sangol	
Khagi Maibi Yumpham	
Thinungei Loyarakpa	
Thinunggei Ningthou	
Eethai Phouoibi	
Thangtek Yangoi Ningthou	
Ngairangbam Khunou Pakhangba	
Kha Yumnam Khunou Loiyarakpa	
Khurai Soubon Lairemma	
Uchekon Panthoibi	
Konthoujam Lairemma	
Takhel Nongpok Ningthou	
Pukhao Laipham Ireima	
Arong Phouoibi	
Pukhao Khabam Eereima	
Heibongpokpi Koubru	
Kongamung Tongbram Loiyarakpa	
Khathong Pakhangba	
Satpam Khongjom Ningthou	
Thokchom Arong Ningthou	
Athokpam Arong Ningthou	
Keirak Sekmai Ningthou	
Khurai Thareima	
Khaidem Loiyarakpa	
Heirok Eekop Ningthou	
Wabagai Pakhangba	
Lairen Kabi Koubru	
Chajing Lakpa	
Irengbam Nameirakpam Khubomba	
Khoijuman Yangoi Ningthou	
Ningom Shang Shang Ningthou	
Nongpok Lourembam Arong Ningthou	
Heisnam Panthoibi	
Oinam Sawongbung Eereima	
Thouban Ningonbam Thouban	
Kongpal Uraleima Ningthou	
Kongpal Puri Puraba	
Bamonkampu Pureiromba	
Tangkham Khulleima	
Charangpat Maning Nongpok Ningthou	
Khongjom Ningthou	
Ahallup Marjing	
Thongak Lairemma Langol	
Irengbam Khoriphaba	
Langol Kameng Koubru	
Kongpal Langmai Leima	
Wakharakpa	
Pangei Marjing	
Lamabam Eerongleimma	
Keirao Lakpa	
Khekman Langbren	
Khekman Pakhangba	
Khekman Leikairakpa	
Wangkheirakpa Yumjao Lairemma	
Shagolmang Eereima	
Meinam Lairemma	
Langmeidong Pakhangba	
Elangbam Panganba	
Meijrao Lakpa	
Lairenjam Lairemma	
Kyamgei Khagemba	
Kyamgei Mungyamba Pakhangba	
Salungpham Nongpok Ningthou	
Kabowakching Loiyarakpa	
Ningthoubung Puraba	
Kangamung Siphai Loiyalakpa	
Pangan Siphai Nungthelleimma	
Hiyanglam Panganba	
Phouden Pakhangba	
Phouden Nongpok Ningthou	
Heinoukhongnembi Laishram Lairemma	
Nongchup Sanjenbam Koubru	
Shamuroulakpa	
Shamuroulakpa Khwai Ningthou	
Shamuroulakpa Leitang Ningthou	
Morok Ingkhol Koubru	
Keinou Ahongshangbam Lairemma	
Keinou Thongthak Koubru	
Ngaikhong Yangoi Ningthou	
Karam Nongshaba	
Waheng Khuman Pakhangba	
Sagontongba Shuraisam Khagemba	
Soubam Mawao Leima	
Khaidem Nganuleima	
Maibakhul Marjing	
Maklang Nungthil Leima	
Heiyen Eekop Ningthou	
Hangun Kalipha	
Tera Khunou Eekop Ningthou	
Tentha Khunou Eekop Ningthou	
Sinam Kom Lainingthou	
Kabo Wakching Nongabi	
Keibi Eereima	
Langol Ningthou	
Tarung Leima	
Phubala Pakhangba	
Pechi Arong Ningthou Eekop Ningthou	
Thangmeiband Kanghujam Naothingkhong	
Khurai Lai Khurembi	
Charangpat Mayai Nongpok	
Laphupat Kalika	
Thamnapokpi Thangjing	
Sairem Khul Koubru	
Khabi Lairembi	
Waroi Ching Malang Humoiba	
Yaingangpokpi Haoreima Sambubi	
Nongpok Kameng Khamlangba	
Kakmayai Panthoibi	
Thongam Mondung Nungang Maharabi	
Kwarokching Tarang Saraba	
Ningol Phouoibi Lokchao Thanungba	
Chandrakhong Nongpok Sawang Lallam Phoriba	
Koirengei Pakhangba Khuman Pokpa	
Kongbamaru Konglouton Louthiba	
Koubru Inamung, Chandeba, Khongdeba	
Kaodrukna Koubru	
Khurkhul Ichum Lairemma	
Sekmai Wangbren	
Phayeng Sawang Soraren	
Leimaram Koubru	
Thongjao Mayang-ngamba	
Nung Santhong Pan Santhong Nungyungbi	
Chothe Thangwai Pakhangba	
Ngakchoupokpi Yangoi Ningthou	
Ishok Chingphu Ningthou	
Kha Lourembam Panthoibi	
Thiyam Laikom Pakhangba	
Sansenbam Panthoibi	
Pukhrambam Panthoibi	
Thounaojam Panthoibi	
Awang Jiri Kabokthong Lairemma	
Kha Potsangbam Panganba	
Naorem Panthoibi	
Pombikhok Loningthou	
Kondong Lairemma	
Chairen Khunbu Leima Khunmabi Panthoibi Tangkhul Huithok Pakhangba	
Nongmaijing Nongpok Apanba Khalongnachingba Laipham	
Kanto Khullel Koubru	
Kanto Khunou Koubru	
Tera Urak Koubru	
Pukhao Naharup Eereima	
Naharup Terapur Eereima	
Chajing Mairelkhong Puthiba	
Leimatak Pakhangba Hidel Pakhangba	
Project Mapal (phase-iv) Pakhangba	
Upokpi Sorarel	
Lamdong Makha Mayang-ngamba	
Heikrujam Mamang Loiyarakpa	
Heikrujam Mamang Khuman Pokpa	
Churachandpur Awang Makha Maikei-ngakpa	
Lairenjam Khoriphaba	
Bamdara Awang Machem Ching Chingthang Lairembi Machem	
Bamdara Makha Manao Ching Chingthasang Lairembi Manao	
Yurembam Matkha Moirangpokpa	
Atom Khul Nganu Leima	
Kadompokpi Maning Mekola Taoding Pakhangba	
Changangei Maning Poklen Pokpa	
Utlou Mamang Nongda Lairen Pakhangba	
Pangei Bazar Tangja Lil Pakhangba	
Khonghampat Khunou Koubru	
Mayang Imphal Konthak Wangba Sorarel	

== Present scenario ==
Presently, these religiously preserved sacred groves are in the situation of being endangered, due to the lack of proper attention and care. These Umang Lais have become the victims of the encroachment and exploitation.

== See also ==
- Uningthou
- Sacred groves of India

== Notes ==
- All the Umang Lais are affiliated to Sanamahism.
- But, Lainingthou Sanamahi, Leimarel Sidabi, and Imoinu Ahongbi are not included in the Umang Lai category.
