= Abhoynagar =

Town in Tripura, India

Coordinates: 23.846°N 91.288°E

Abhoynagar, also known as Abhaynagar, Abhoinagar, Abhainagar, is a town in Agartala, Tripura, India. Meitei people in Tripura mainly worship their traditional deity Puthiba in this place, and celebrate state level Lai Haraoba in Tripura, which is recognised by the Government of Tripura as an official state holiday. Historically, the cult and the shrine of the deity was established by Tulshibati (ꯇꯨꯜꯁꯤꯕꯇꯤ), one of the Meitei queens of Tripura's King Radhakishore Manikya (r. 1896–1909).
