= Pratapgarh, Tripura Assembly constituency =

Legislative Assembly constituency in Tripura State, India

Coordinates: 23.82°N 91.29°E

Pratapgarh
- Constituency No. 13 for the Tripura Legislative Assembly

Constituency details
- Country: India
- Region: Northeast India
- State: Tripura
- District: West Tripura
- Lok Sabha constituency: Tripura West
- Established: 1972
- Total electors: 57,803
- Reservation: SC

Member of Legislative Assembly
- 13th Tripura Legislative Assembly
- Incumbent Ramu Das
- Party: CPI(M)
- Elected year: 2023

Pratapgarh is one of the 60 Legislative Assembly constituencies of Tripura state in India. It is in West Tripura district and is reserved for candidates belonging to the Scheduled Castes. It is also part of West Tripura Lok Sabha constituency.

== Members of the Legislative Assembly ==
Election	Member	Party
1972	Madhusudan Das	Indian National Congress
1977	Anil Sarkar	Communist Party of India
1983	Anil Sarkar	Communist Party of India
1988	Anil Sarkar	Communist Party of India
1993	Anil Sarkar	Communist Party of India
1998	Anil Sarkar	Communist Party of India
2003	Anil Sarkar	Communist Party of India
2008	Anil Sarkar	Communist Party of India
2013	Anil Sarkar	Communist Party of India
2015 by-election	Ramu Das	Communist Party of India
2018	Rebati Mohan Das	Bharatiya Janata Party
2023	Ramu Das	Communist Party of India

== Election results ==
=== 2023 Assembly election ===
2023 Tripura Legislative Assembly election: Pratapgarh
Party	Candidate	Votes	%	±%
CPI(M)	Ramu Das	26,422	49.61%	▲4.74
BJP	Rebati Mohan Das	24,336	45.70%	▼5.40
AITC	Kuheli Das	1,181	2.22%	▲1.58
Independent	Ashok Kumar Das	761	1.43%	New
NOTA	None of the Above	555	1.04%	▲0.30
Margin of victory		2,086	3.92%	▼2.31
Turnout		53,255	92.21%	▼3.47
Registered electors		57,803		▲9.30
CPI(M) gain from BJP		Swing	▼1.48	

=== 2018 Assembly election ===
2018 Tripura Legislative Assembly election: Pratapgarh
Party	Candidate	Votes	%	±%
BJP	Rebati Mohan Das	25,834	51.10%	▲27.77
CPI(M)	Ramu Das	22,686	44.87%	New
INC	Arjun Das	628	1.24%	▼10.59
NOTA	None of the Above	374	0.74%	New
AITC	Mithun Das	322	0.64%	New
AMB	Birendra Das	290	0.57%	New
Margin of victory		3,148	6.23%	▼33.29
Turnout		50,557	94.86%	▲8.00
Registered electors		52,884		▲5.67
BJP gain from CPI		Swing	▼11.75	

=== 2015 Assembly by-election ===
2015 Tripura Legislative Assembly by-election: Pratapgarh
Party	Candidate	Votes	%	±%
CPI	Ramu Das	27,555	62.85%	New
BJP	Mousumi Das	10,229	23.33%	New
INC	Ranjit Kumar Das	5,187	11.83%	▼34.98
NOTA	None of the Above	525	1.20%	New
Independent	Anil Chandra Das	520	1.19%	New
Independent	Biplab Chandra Sarkar	349	0.80%	New
Margin of victory		17,326	39.52%	▲34.95
Turnout		43,840	88.65%	▲64.79
Registered electors		50,046		
CPI gain from CPI(M)		Swing	▲11.48	

=== 2013 Assembly election ===
2013 Tripura Legislative Assembly election: Pratapgarh
Party	Candidate	Votes	%	±%
CPI(M)	Anil Sarkar	23,977	51.38%	▼2.41
INC	Ranjit Kumar Das	21,845	46.81%	▲4.83
Independent	Biplab Chandra Sarkar	846	1.81%	New
Margin of victory		2,132	4.57%	▼7.24
Turnout		46,668	22.82%	▼69.49
Registered electors		2,04,601		
CPI(M) hold		Swing		

=== 2008 Assembly election ===
2008 Tripura Legislative Assembly election: Pratapgarh
Party	Candidate	Votes	%	±%
CPI(M)	Anil Sarkar	32,105	53.79%	▼0.48
INC	Bimal Chandra Barman	25,055	41.97%	▲0.60
BJP	Arjun Chandra Das	1,026	1.72%	▲0.04
LJP	Putul Rani Mitra	880	1.47%	New
CPI(ML)L	Nandalal Das	625	1.05%	New
Margin of victory		7,050	11.81%	▼1.08
Turnout		59,691	92.75%	▲11.34
Registered electors		64,673		▲15.31
CPI(M) hold		Swing	▼0.48	

=== 2003 Assembly election ===
2003 Tripura Legislative Assembly election: Pratapgarh
Party	Candidate	Votes	%	±%
CPI(M)	Anil Sarkar	24,638	54.26%	▲3.86
INC	Narayan Das	18,784	41.37%	▼1.58
BJP	Arjun Chandra Das	764	1.68%	▼4.32
Independent	Rahul Das	590	1.30%	New
Independent	Nandalal Das	440	0.97%	New
Margin of victory		5,854	12.89%	▲5.45
Turnout		45,405	80.96%	▼0.11
Registered electors		56,085		▲13.14
CPI(M) hold		Swing	▲3.86	

=== 1998 Assembly election ===
1998 Tripura Legislative Assembly election: Pratapgarh
Party	Candidate	Votes	%	±%
CPI(M)	Anil Sarkar	20,255	50.40%	▼7.05
INC	Narayan Chandra Das	17,262	42.95%	▲4.22
BJP	Amita Malakar	2,412	6.00%	▲4.00
Margin of victory		2,993	7.45%	▼11.27
Turnout		40,188	82.67%	▲1.02
Registered electors		49,572		▲5.40
CPI(M) hold		Swing		

=== 1993 Assembly election ===
1993 Tripura Legislative Assembly election: Pratapgarh
Party	Candidate	Votes	%	±%
CPI(M)	Anil Sarkar	21,629	57.45%	▲4.03
INC	Madhusudan Das	14,581	38.73%	▼6.95
BJP	Dinesh Das	753	2.00%	New
Independent	Nakul Das	299	0.79%	New
Margin of victory		7,048	18.72%	▲10.98
Turnout		37,649	81.32%	▼4.08
Registered electors		47,032		▲33.97
CPI(M) hold		Swing	▲4.03	

=== 1988 Assembly election ===
1988 Tripura Legislative Assembly election: Pratapgarh
Party	Candidate	Votes	%	±%
CPI(M)	Anil Sarkar	15,778	53.42%	▼4.97
INC	Madhusudan Das	13,492	45.68%	▲5.53
Independent	Birendra Chandra Das	264	0.89%	New
Margin of victory		2,286	7.74%	▼10.50
Turnout		29,534	85.36%	▲0.06
Registered electors		35,106		▲35.31
CPI(M) hold		Swing		

=== 1983 Assembly election ===
1983 Tripura Legislative Assembly election: Pratapgarh
Party	Candidate	Votes	%	±%
CPI(M)	Anil Sarkar	12,736	58.40%	▼8.04
INC	Monomohan Das	8,758	40.16%	▲19.39
Independent	Barinda Das	164	0.75%	New
Independent	Madhusudan Das	152	0.70%	New
Margin of victory		3,978	18.24%	▼27.43
Turnout		21,810	85.63%	▲3.44
Registered electors		25,944		▲27.85
CPI(M) hold		Swing	▼8.04	

=== 1977 Assembly election ===
1977 Tripura Legislative Assembly election: Pratapgarh
Party	Candidate	Votes	%	±%
CPI(M)	Anil Sarkar	10,869	66.44%	▲20.85
INC	Madhusudan Das	3,397	20.76%	▼28.24
JP	Monomohan Das	1,758	10.75%	New
TPCC	Rama Das	336	2.05%	New
Margin of victory		7,472	45.67%	▲42.26
Turnout		16,360	82.27%	▲19.30
Registered electors		20,292		▲57.89
CPI(M) gain from INC		Swing	▲17.43	

=== 1972 Assembly election ===
1972 Tripura Legislative Assembly election: Pratapgarh
Party	Candidate	Votes	%	±%
INC	Madhusudan Das	3,862	49.00%	New
CPI(M)	Jadab Chandra Majumder	3,593	45.59%	New
Independent	Amal Chandra Das	426	5.41%	New
Margin of victory		269	3.41%	
Turnout		7,881	62.80%	
Registered electors		12,852		
INC win (new seat)				

== See also ==
- List of constituencies of the Tripura Legislative Assembly
- West Tripura district
- Pratapgarh
- Tripura West (Lok Sabha constituency)
