= Pratapgarh, Tripura =

Pratapgarh
- town
- Location within Tripura Location within India
- Coordinates: 23.81°N 91.30°E
- Country: India
- State: Tripura
- District: West Tripura

Population (2001)
  - Total: 25,890

Languages
  - Official: Bengali, Kokborok, English
- Time zone: UTC+5:30 (IST)
- Vehicle registration: TR
- Website: tripura.gov.in

Pratapgarh is a census town in West Tripura district in the Indian state of Tripura.

== Geography ==
Pratapgarh is located at 23.81°N 91.30°E.

== Demographics ==
As of 2001 India census, Pratapgarh had a population of 25,890. Males constitute 51% of the population and females 49%. Pratapgarh has an average literacy rate of 72%, higher than the national average of 59.5%: male literacy is 77%, and female literacy is 67%. In Pratapgarh, 11% of the population is under 6 years of age.

== Politics ==
Pratapgarh assembly constituency is part of Tripura West (Lok Sabha constituency).
