= List of institutions of higher education in Tripura =

This is a list of higher educational institutions in Tripura, an Indian state.

== Universities ==
- Central Sanskrit University (Ekalavya Campus)
- Dhamma Dipa International Buddhist University, Tripura
- ICFAI University, Tripura
- Indira Gandhi National Open University, Agartala Regional Centre
- Maharaja Bir Bikram University
- National Forensic Sciences University (Tripura Campus)
- National Law University, Tripura
- Techno India University, Tripura
- Tripura University

== Engineering and Polytechnic Institutes ==
- Indian Institute of Information Technology, Agartala
- National Institute of Electronics & Information Technology
- National Institute of Technology, Agartala
- Tripura Institute of Technology

== Medical, Paramedical and Nursing Institutes ==
- Agartala Government Medical College
- Tripura Medical College & Dr. B.R. Ambedkar Memorial Teaching Hospital
- Tripura Santiniketan Medical College

== Other Professional Degree Institutes ==
- College of Agriculture, Tripura
- Maharaja Bir Bikram University

== General Degree Colleges ==
- Bir Bikram Memorial College
- Dasarath Deb Memorial College
- Government Degree College, Kanchanpur
- Government Degree College, Longtharai Valley
- Holy Cross College
- Iswar Chandra Vidyasagar College
- Kabi Nazrul Mahavidyalaya
- Maharaja Bir Bikram College
- Michael Madhusudan Dutta College
- Rabindranath Thakur Mahavidyalaya, Bishalgarh
- Ramkrishna Mahavidyalaya
- Ramthakur College
