= Michael Madhusudan Dutta College =

College in Tripura, India

- Motto: Vidyayā'mritamașnute
- Motto in English: Immortal through knowledge
- Type: Undergraduate college
- Established: 1987; 39 years ago
- Affiliations: Tripura University
- Principal: Dr. Anupam Guha
- Location: Sabroom, Tripura, 799145, India; 23.0230521°N 91.7085846°E
- Campus: Rural
- Website: http://www.mmdcollege.in/

Michael Madhusudan Dutta College, (also known as MMD College), established in 1987, is a general degree college in Sabroom, South Tripura. It offers undergraduate courses in arts and sciences. It is affiliated to Tripura University. The college is recognized by the University Grants Commission (UGC).

== See also ==
- Education in India
- Education in Tripura
- Michael Madhusudan Dutt
- Tripura University
- Literacy in India
- List of institutions of higher education in Tripura
