= Sailendra Chandra Nath =

Indian politician

Member of the Tripura Legislative Assembly
- Incumbent
- Assumed office 2023
- Preceded by: Malina Debnath
- Constituency: Jubarajnagar

Personal details
- Born: 1967 (age 58–59)
- Party: Communist Party of India (Marxist)
- Parent: Tarani Kumar Nath (Father)
- Education: Graduate (B.com)
- Alma mater: Tripura University

Sailendra Chandra Nath is an Indian politician and Member of Tripura Legislative Assembly representing the Jubarajnagar constituency. He is a member of the Communist Party of India (Marxist) from Tripura.

Nath graduated with a B.Com. from Tripura University in 1988.
