= Ramkrishna Mahavidyalaya =

College in Tripura, India

- Motto: Atmano mokshath jagat hitaya cha (आत्मनो मोक्षार्थं जगद्धिताय च) (For one’s own salvation and for the welfare of the world)
- Type: Undergraduate college
- Established: 1950; 76 years ago
- Affiliations: Tripura University
- Principal: Dr. Ajit Barman
- Location: Kailashahar, Tripura, 799277, India; 24.3153663°N 91.99483°E
- Campus: Urban
- Website: rkmkls.ac.in

Ramkrishna Mahavidyalaya is a general degree college affiliated to Tripura University (a central university) located in Kailashahar, Tripura. It is the second-oldest college in Tripura, established in 1950. This college provides several undergraduate courses and also offers two postgraduate courses started in 2022.

The founder of the college, Tapas Chaitanya Maharaj, wished to transmit to society the ideals of Sri Ramkrishna Paramhamsa Dev and Swami Vivekananda. Dr. Sachchidananda Dhar was the founder and principal of the college. Initially, the college offered only arts courses, but later, science and commerce streams were added. The college was privately owned for more than thirty years. After that, the government took over the college in 1982.

== Enumeration ==
This college is made up of a total of 5 buildings, with 55 rooms, of which 30 are classrooms. This college has five office rooms and staff rooms. There are 20 additional rooms. A separate science department of the college was inaugurated on October 14, 2022, by Chief Minister, Dr. Manik Saha. Teachers, students, and dignitaries attended the ceremony, including the Hon'ble Minister for Social Welfare and Social Education, Santana Chakma.

== Courses and subjects ==
- Bachelor of science:
1. Mathematics
2. Physics
3. Chemistry
4. Botany
5. Zoology
6. Physiology
7. Computer Science

- Bachelor of arts:
1. Bengali
2. Political Science
3. History
4. Education
5. Philosophy
6. Economics
7. Sanskrit
8. Pali
9. Hindi
10. Music
11. Physical
12. Education

- Bachelor of commerce:
1. Commerce

== See also ==
- Education in India
- Education in Tripura
- Tripura University
- Literacy in India
- List of institutions of higher education in Tripura
