= Tripura Board of Secondary Education =

School education board in India

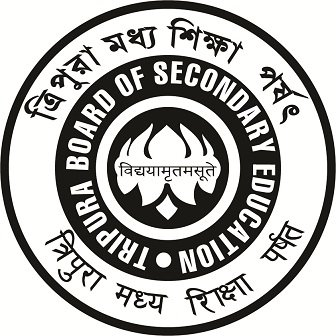
- Abbreviation: TBSE
- Formation: 1973
- Type: Government Board of School Education
- Headquarters: Agartala, Tripura, India
- Location: Tripura, India
- Official language: Bengali, English
- President: Dr. Dhananjay Gon Choudhury
- Secretary: Dr. Dulal Dey
- Dy. Secretary: Shri Subhasis Choudhury, Shri Bikramjit Debbarma.
- Website: www.tbse.tripura.gov.in

Tripura Board of Secondary Education (TBSE) is a board of school education in the state of Tripura, India. Currently Dr.Bhabatosh Saha is the president of TBSE.It is a state agency of the Government of Tripura which is responsible for the promotion and development of secondary education in the state. Most of the public schools of the state follow the TBSE system.

== History ==
Tripura Board of Secondary Education was established in the year 1973 under the Tripura Act. No.12 and named after Tripura Board of Secondary Education Act, 1973 by Tripura Legislative Assembly. The board came in operation from the year 1976. This Board is also providing higher education and granting to its affiliated schools.

== Board Exams ==
Every year Tripura Board of Secondary Education conducts 10th and 12th Board exams in Feb-March.

== See also ==
- Education in Tripura
- Central Board of Secondary Education (CBSE), India
- National Institute of Open Schooling (NIOS), India
- Indian Certificate of Secondary Education (ICSE), India
- Indian School Certificate (ISC), India
- Council for the Indian School Certificate Examinations (CISCE), India
- Secondary School Leaving Certificate (SSLC), India
- State Board of School Examinations (Sec.) & Board of Higher Secondary Examinations, Tamil Nadu (SBSEBHSE), India
