= Dasarath Deb Memorial College =

College in Tripura, India

- Type: Undergraduate college
- Established: 1979; 47 years ago
- Academic affiliations: Tripura University
- Principal: Dr. Nirmal Bhadra
- Location: Khowai, Tripura, 799202, India; 24.0743407°N 91.606528°E
- Campus: Urban
- Website: http://www.ddmctripura.edu.in/

Dasarath Deb Memorial College (DDMC), established in 1979, is a general degree college in Khowai, Tripura. It offers undergraduate courses in arts, commerce and sciences. It is affiliated to Tripura University.

== Accreditation ==
The college is recognized by the University Grants Commission (UGC).

== See also ==
- Education in India
- Education in Tripura
- Tripura University
- Literacy in India
