= Malina Debnath =

Indian politician

Member of the Tripura Legislative Assembly
- In office 28 June 2022 – 2023
- Preceded by: Ramendra Chandra Debnath
- Succeeded by: Sailendra Chandra Nath
- Constituency: Jubarajnagar

Personal details
- Born: 1975 or 1976 (age 50–51)
- Party: Bharatiya Janata Party
- Education: Tripura University (MA)

Malina Debnath (born 1976) is an Indian politician from Tripura. She was a Member of the Tripura Legislative Assembly from the Jubarajnagar Assembly constituency in North Tripura district.

== Personal life ==
Debnath earned a Master of Arts degree in Bengali from Tripura University in 2001.

== Career ==
Debnath won a 2022 Tripura by-election representing the Bharatiya Janata Party from the Jubarajnagar Assembly constituency by a margin of 4,572 votes. She was sworn in on 28 June 2022. However, she lost the 2023 Tripura Legislative Assembly election on the BJP ticket to Sailendra Chandra Nath of the CPI (M) by a narrow margin of 296 votes.
