= Ramendra Chandra Debnath =

Indian politician (1955–2022)

Speaker of the Tripura Legislative Assembly
- In office 2003–2018
- Preceded by: Jitendra Sarkar
- Succeeded by: Rebati Mohan Das
- Constituency: Jubarajnagar

Member of Tripura Legislative Assembly
- In office 1993–2022
- Preceded by: Biva Rani Nath
- Succeeded by: Malina Debnath
- Constituency: Jubarajnagar

Personal details
- Born: Ramendra Chandra Debnath; 18 August 1955 Tripura
- Died: 1 February 2022 (aged 66) Kolkata, West Bengal, India
- Party: Communist Party of India (Marxist)

Ramendra Chandra Debnath (18 August 1955 – 1 February 2022) was an Indian politician. He was a member of the Communist Party of India (Marxist). He was the speaker of the Tripura Legislative Assembly from 2003 to 2018. He represented Jubarajnagar (Vidhan Sabha constituency). He was also minister in the Tripura Legislative Assembly from 1998 to 2003.

== Death ==
Debnath died from renal failure on 1 February 2022, at the age of 66.
