= Maharaja Bir Bikram University =

University in Tripura, India

- Motto: Ideas Imagination Innovations
- Type: Public
- Established: 2015; 11 years ago
- Affiliations: UGC
- Chancellor: Governor of Tripura
- Vice-Chancellor: Dr. Bibhas Deb
- Location: Agartala, Tripura, 799004, India; 23.8278367°N 91.2974241°E
- Campus: Urban
- Website: https://mbbuniversity.ac.in/

Maharaja Bir Bikram University (MBB University) is a state university located at Agartala, Tripura, India. The university is named after Bir Bikram Kishore Debbarman, the last ruling maharaja of the princely state of Tripura.

== Affiliated colleges ==
MBB University has three affiliated colleges:

- Bir Bikram Memorial College
- Maharaja Bir Bikram College
- Tripura Government Law College

== History ==
The University was established in 2015 by the Government of Tripura through the Maharaja Bir Bikram University Act, 2015 and the foundation stone was laid by the then Governor of Tripura, Tathagata Roy.

The first vice chancellor (VC) was Gautam Kumar Basu. Satyadeo Poddar was appointed as VC in December 2019. Poddar took retirement in February 2025. The current VC Bibhas Deb took charge in March 2025.

== Location ==
The campus of MBB University is situated at College Tilla, 3 km away from the city centre of Agartala. The campus is of 240 acres.

== See also ==
- Education in India
- Education in Tripura
- List of institutions of higher education in Tripura
