= Ahmed Javed =

Indian police officer

His Excellency Ahmed Javed PPM
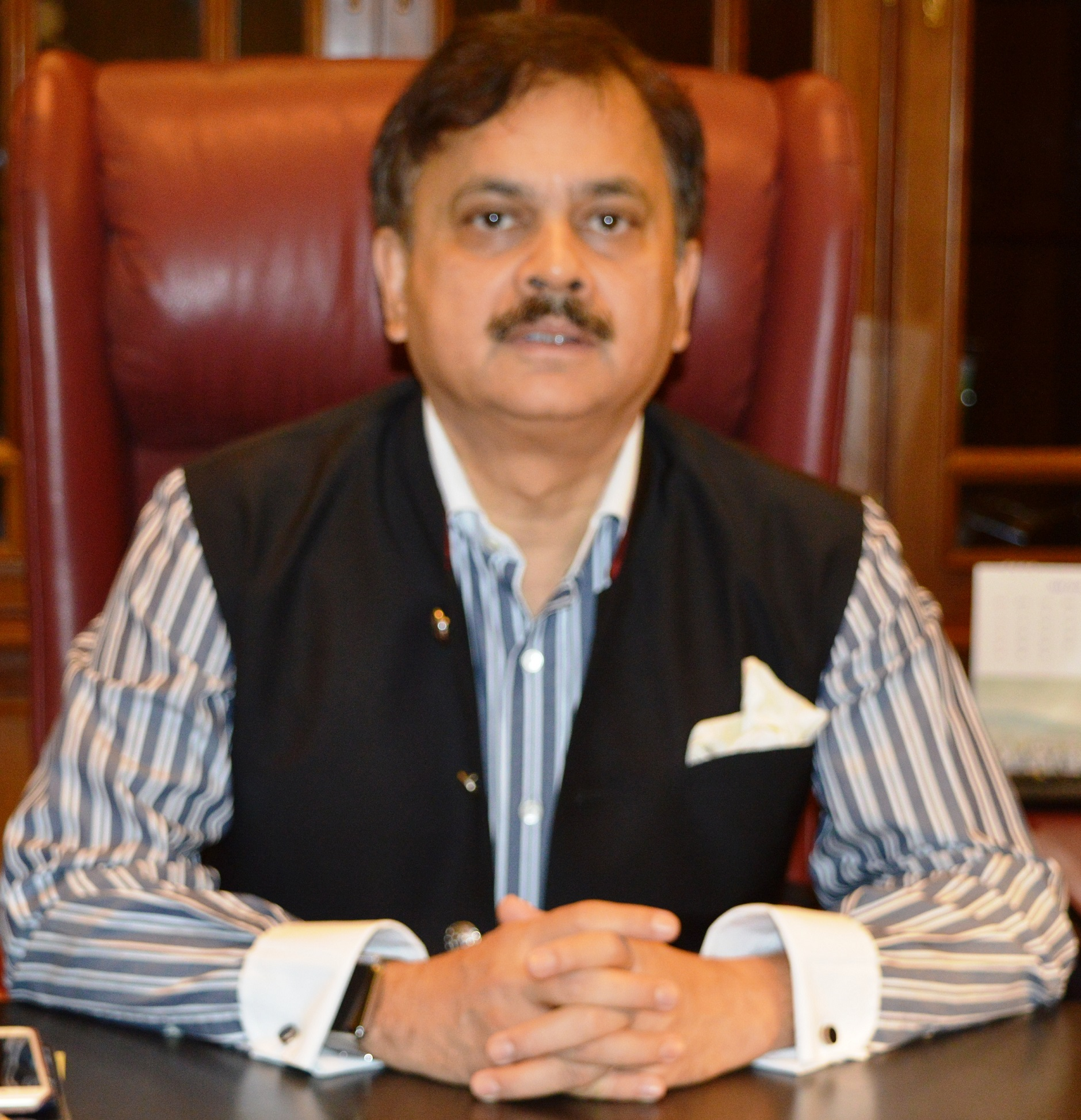

20th Indian Ambassador to Saudi Arabia
- In office 12 December 2015 – April 2019
- President: Pranab Mukherjee; Ram Nath Kovind
- Preceded by: Hamid Ali Rao
- Succeeded by: Ausaf Sayeed

39th Police Commissioner of Mumbai
- In office 8 September 2015 – 31 January 2016
- Preceded by: Rakesh Maria
- Succeeded by: Dattatray Padsalgikar

Personal details
- Born: 2 January 1956 (age 70) Uttar Pradesh, India
- Education: St. Stephen's College, Delhi
- Awards: President's Police Medal for Distinguished Service. Police Medal for Meritorious Service. 50th Anniversary Independence Medal.

Military service
- Rank: Director General of Police

Ahmad Javed PPM (born 2 January 1956) is a retired Indian police officer and civil servant who was the 39th Commissioner of Police, Mumbai, India. He was succeeded by Dattatray Padsalgikar. He is former Indian Ambassador to Saudi Arabia. Javed is the second former Mumbai police commissioner to get a diplomatic posting after J. F. Ribeiro who served as Indian ambassador to Romania between 1989 and 1993. Currently, he is the Chancellor of Tripura University.

== Career ==
A 1980 batch IPS officer, Ahmad Javed was appointed as the Commissioner of Mumbai Police on 8 September 2015 by the Maharashtra Government replacing Rakesh Maria.

He served as Superintendent of Police in Buldhana and Nanded before being posted as Deputy Commissioner of Police, Intelligence, in Mumbai. He then served in various postings, including a stint with the Delhi Police between 1983 and 1985. He returned to Mumbai in the early 2000s, serving as Additional Commissioner of Police of the Central Region and then the South Region, before being promoted to Inspector General of Police, he was posted as Joint Commissioner of Police (Law and Order). He served in this key post from 2002 to 2005.

After being promoted as Additional Director General of Police, Javed was posted with the state reserve police force and with the Maharashtra Police Headquarters as ADG Establishment, and then he took over as Commissioner of Police, Navi Mumbai in 2010. He currently is Ambassador of India in Saudi Arabia.

He was earlier the Director General of Police (Home Guards).

On 12 December 2015 Ahmad Javed was appointed India's Ambassador to Saudi Arabia, six months after last Ambassador Hamid Ali Rao had retired.

== Personal life ==
Ahmad Javed comes from Lucknow. His father Mr. Qazi Mukhtar is a retired senior IAS officer.

Ahmad Javed graduated in Bachelors in Arts from Delhi's St Stephen's College. Javed is married to Shabnam with whom he has two children, Amer and Zaara.His family are still in his home town Tanda Lucknow.

He used to wear Khaki 'Khadi' uniform daily. He is an avid billiards player.

== Controversy ==
=== Rakesh Maria's appointment ===
There was a controversy over Maria's appointment as a commissioner though Ahmed Javed was the senior for the Commissioner of Police post.

Ahmad Javed was surprised when his junior, Rakesh Maria, who is from the 1981 batch, had been appointed the CP instead of him. Many suspected political favouritism and questions were raised on how a junior-level officer had become the commissioner superseding the senior. In Feb 2014, Maria had taken charge as the Mumbai Police commissioner – a prestigious post – superseding his senior, Javed, who was then promoted by the Cong-NCP government as DG, Home Guards, a post that does not have much to offer to an officer.

"Maria managed to get the post of Commissioner of Police as he was very close to some NCP leaders who helped him take the posting superseding seniors like IPS officer Vijay Kamble, who was made Thane Commissioner of Police and Ahmad Javed, who became DG, Home guards", said a police officer. Javed and Kamble had both protested at the time and some IPS officers, like Prem Krishna Jain, had even resigned, as they were upset with the government's system of appointing people.

Javed could have never thought that he would become the Commissioner as he had already been promoted as Director General of Police and the post of Mumbai Police Commissioner is held by an officer of the rank of Additional DGP, which is a lower post. However the rank for the post for Commissioner was upgraded to that of Director General. After the announcement by the CM, Javed was appointed as Commissioner, which left Maria in confusion by the sudden announcement.
