= College of Agriculture, Tripura =

Agricultural College in Tripura

- Type: Undergraduate college
- Established: 2007
- Affiliations: Tripura University
- Principal: Dr. Debashish Sen
- Academic staff: 25
- Location: Lembucherra, Agartala, Tripura, 799210, India; 23.9137351°N 91.3192233°E
- Campus: Urban
- Language: English
- Website: http://coatripura.ac.in/

College of Agriculture, Tripura, established in 2007, is a professional degree college for agriculture in Agartala, Tripura. The College of Agriculture, Tripura started its journey on 24th August, 2007 with 19 students at Upgraded Training Centre (U.G.T.C) campus of the Department of Agriculture, Government of Tripura, at Lembucherra, West Tripura. Former Chief Minister Honourable Sri Manik Sankar laid the foundation stone for the new building complex at Lembucherra on 24th August 2007 and the inauguration of the new college building at present campus was held on 19th July, 2011. The college is affiliated to Tripura University (a Central University), Suryamaninagar and accredited to the Indian Council of Agricultural Research (ICAR), New Delhi. The college is offering B.Sc. (Agriculture) course of 4 years duration and aspire to be upgraded to an Agricultural University.

== Courses ==
It offers undergraduate B.Sc.(Hons.) Agriculture course.

== Accreditation ==
The college is affiliated to the Tripura University. The college is recognized by the University Grants Commission (UGC).

== See also ==
- Education in India
- Education in Tripura
- Tripura University
- Literacy in India
