= Arunoday Saha =

Indian academic and politician

Dr. Arunoday Saha
- Born: 4 February 1948 (age 78); Bishalgarh, Tripura, India
- Citizenship: Indian
- Education: Presidency College (B.A.); Calcutta University (M.A.); Utah State University (Ph.D.)
- Occupations: Academic, Professor, Politician, Writer
- Known for: First vice-chancellor of Tripura University (appointed in 2007)
- Political party: Indian National Congress
- Spouse: Prof. Manjari Choudhury (marriage date unknown – 2010; her death)
- Father: Abani Mohan Saha
- Awards: Padma Shri (2025); Tripura Vibhushan (2023)

Arunoday Saha (born 4 February 1948) is an Indian academic, politician and writer from Tripura. He served as the first vice-chancellor of Tripura University after it was elevated to a central university in 2007. Saha is known for his contributions to the field of education and literature.

He is a member of the Indian National Congress and contested the 2014 Indian general election from the Tripura West constituency. In recognition of his work, he was awarded the *Tripura Vibhushan*, the state's highest civilian award, in 2023 and the Padma Shri, India’s fourth-highest civilian award, in 2025 for his contribution to literature and education.

== Life ==
Saha was born into a Bengali family in Bishalgarh, Tripura. His father, Abani Mohan Saha, was a businessman.

He obtained his B.A. from Presidency College, Kolkata, M.A. in Economics from University of Calcutta, and Ph.D. from Utah State University. On 3 July 2007, he was appointed as the first vice-chancellor of Tripura University after it attained central university status. He retired on 18 February 2013.

Saha entered politics with the Indian National Congress. He stated, "My family has traditionally been with the Congress but this nomination as a Congress candidate for Lok Sabha is slightly unexpected. But as the party has honoured me, I will also do my best in the election."

He is also a published writer. His articles have appeared in journals and newspapers, and he has authored books related to economics and public issues.

His wife, Prof. Manjari Choudhury, died in 2010.

== See also ==
- Tripura University
- Bishalgarh
- Tripura West (Lok Sabha constituency)
