= Tripura Institute of Technology =

Engineering college in Tripura, India

- Type: Undergraduate college
- Established: 1958
- Affiliations: Tripura University
- Principal: Bijoy Kumar Upadhyaya
- Location: Narsingarh, Tripura, India; 23.9063929°N 91.2469451°E
- Campus: Urban
- Approvals: AICTE
- Website: titagartala.ac.in

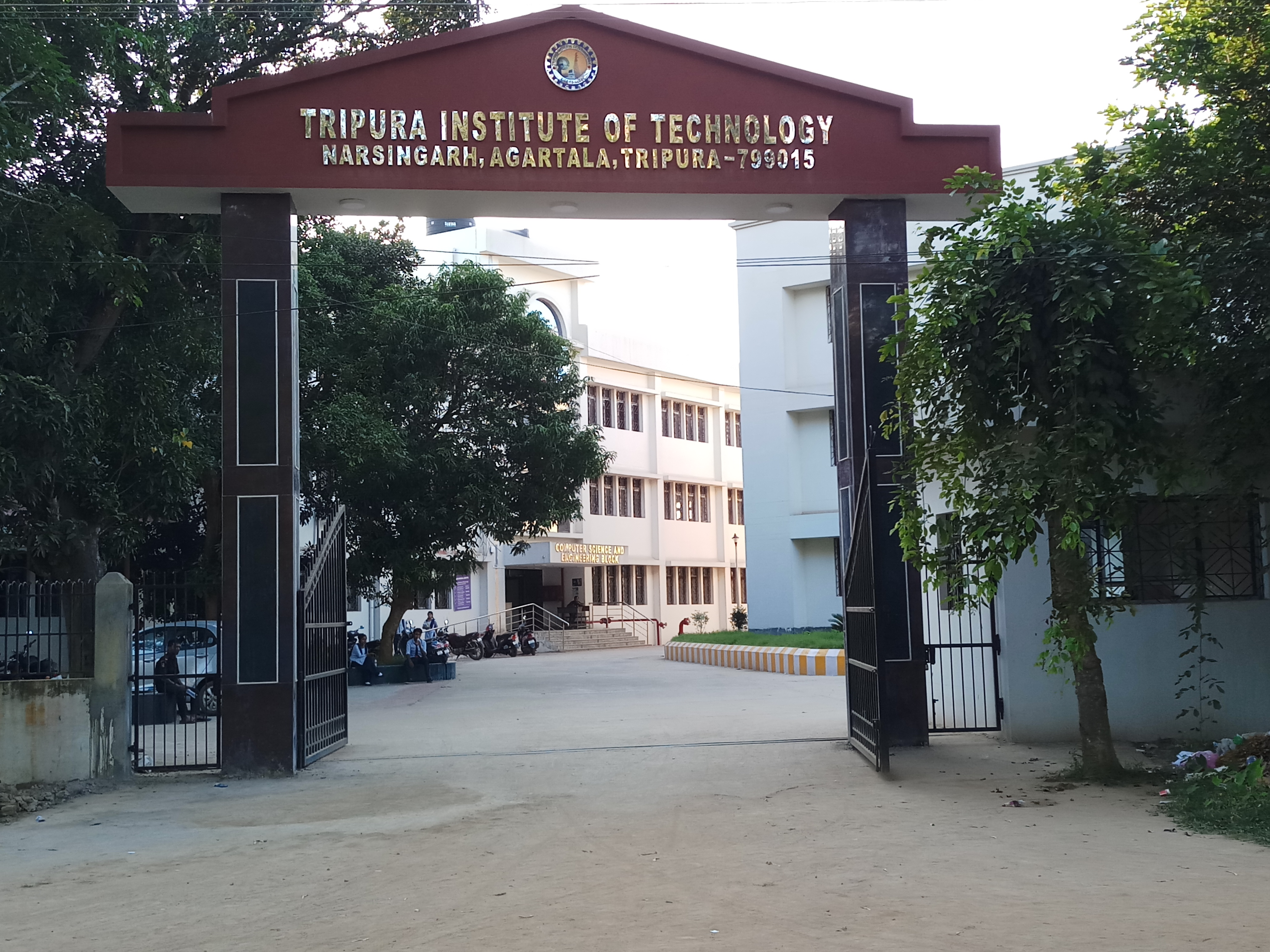
Entrance gate

Tripura Institute of Technology (TIT), formerly Polytechnic Institute, Narsingarh, is an engineering college located at Narsingarh in the West Tripura district of Tripura, India, 12 km from Agartala. It offers diploma and degree courses in Engineering and Technology.

== History ==
The institute started in 1958 as Polytechnic Institute, Narsingarh, with branches of Civil, Electrical and Mechanical Engineering, affiliated to the West Bengal State Council of Technical Education. Electronics and Telecommunication Engineering was started in 1995.

The Ministry of Human Resource and World Bank began the Tech. Ed.-III project for student capacity increase and quality improvement, in the period 2001 to 2007. The project resulted in new branches in Computer Science and Technology, Food Processing Technology, Automobile Engineering, Interior Decoration Handicrafts and Furniture Designing and Modern Office Practice and Management.

With the introduction of the degree module from the academic session 2007-08 the entire academic control of both degree and diploma came under Tripura University. The diploma level students already registered under West Bengal State Council of Technical Education up to the academic session 2006-07 remained with WBSCTE. The curricula and other academic control of the Tripura Institute of Technology both of diploma and degree, came under the control of Tripura University from June 2007.

== Departments ==
- Architectural Assistant-ship
- Automobile Engineering
- Civil Engineering
- Computer Science and Engineering
- Electrical Engineering
- Electronics and Communication Engineering
- Food Processing Technology
- Mechanical Engineering
- Science and Humanities

== Campus ==
TIT is located at its own campus at Narsingarh, a suburb of Agartala. The campus is situated 2 km from the Agartala Airport. The institute runs two campuses, one for the Diploma and the other for the Degree Module.

== Events ==
=== Ishaanya ===
Ishaanya is an annual Techno-Cultural fest organised by the student body of Tripura Institute of Technology. Various cultural activities such as dances, music, and dramas are organised and participated in by the students. There are also activities such as quiz competitions.

=== FreshTech ===
FreshTech is a freshers party organised by the student body of Tripura Institute of Technology for first year students. Various cultural activities such as dances, music, dramas and are organised and participated in by the first year students.

== See also ==
- Education in Tripura
- List of institutions of higher education in Tripura
