= Education in Tripura =

Aspect of culture in India

Education in Tripura, a state in Northeast India, is provided by both the public sector and the private sector. On 8 September 2013, the literacy rate of Tripura was declared to be 92.3% which was among the highest in all states of India.

== Literacy ==
Data from 2011 census of India reveals that overall literacy rate in the State was 87.75 percent with male literacy rate of 92.18 percent and female literacy rate of 83.14 percent.

== Structure ==
Tripura schools are run by the state government or by private organisations, including religious institutions. Instruction is mainly in English or Bengali, though Kokborok and other tribal languages are also used. The schools are affiliated with the Council for the Indian School Certificate Examinations (CISCE), the Central Board for Secondary Education (CBSE), the National Institute of Open School (NIOS) or the Tripura Board of Secondary Education. Under the 10+2+3 plan, after completing secondary school, students typically enroll for 2 years in a junior college, also known as pre-university, or in schools with a higher secondary facility affiliated with the Tripura Board of Secondary Education or any central board. Students choose from one of three streams, namely liberal arts, commerce or science. Upon completing the required coursework, students may enroll in general or professional degree programs.

== Statistics ==
According to Economic Review of Tripura 2010–11, Tripura has a total of 4,455 schools. The different types of school in the four districts are listed in the table below.

Type	West Tripura	North Tripura	South Tripura	Dhalai	Total
Primary / Junior Basic	795	369	621	513	2,298
Middle/ Senior basic	432	244	349	249	1,274
High	234	94	156	49	533
Higher Secondary (+2)	172	63	87	28	350
Total	1633	770	1,213	839	4,455

The aggregate enrollment in different types of schools in the state are as follows:

Type	Enrollment
Primary	394418
Middle	215680
High	113344
Higher secondary	44230
Total	767672

== Higher education ==
The State has one Central University (Tripura University), one State University (Maharaja Bir Bikram University) and one Private University, ICFAI University ( a branch of the Institute of Chartered Financial Analysts of India). There are 15 general colleges, 3 engineering colleges(Tripura Institute of Technology, Techno India Agartala and National Institute of Technology, Agartala), 2 medical colleges (Agartala Government Medical College and Tripura Medical College), 5 polytechnic colleges, one law college, one music college, and one art college.

== See also ==
- List of institutions of higher education in Tripura
