= Bishalgarh =

- Town
- Interactive map of Bishalgarh
- Country: India
- State: Tripura
- District: Sepahijala district
- Sub-division: Bishalgarh
- Local Language: Bengali, Kokborok

Government
  - Type: Municipal Council
  - Body: Bishalgarh Municipal Council
  - Chairman: Anjan Purkayastha (BJP)

Population (2015)
  - Total: 23,721
- Time zone: UTC+05:30 (IST)
- PIN: 799102
- ISO 3166 code: IN-TR
- Website: tripura.gov.in

Bishalgarh (Bengali pronunciation: [biʃalgɔr]) is a major town located in the Indian state of Tripura and a Municipal Council in Sipahijala district. As of 2001 census Bishalgarh has a population of 23,721. 12,248 people are male. 11,473 are female.

== See also ==
- List of cities and towns in Tripura
- Arunoday Saha
