= Tripura Santiniketan Medical College =

- Type: Private
- Established: 2024; 2 years ago
- Affiliations: National Medical Commission
- Academic affiliations: Tripura University
- Chairman: Malay Pit
- Principal: Dr. Ranjit Kumar Das
- Students: Total: MBBS - 150
- Location: Madhuban, Amtali, Agartala, Tripura, India
- Website: tripurasmc.com

Tripura Santiniketan Medical College (TSMC), established in 2024, is a private medical college located in Madhuban, Agartala, Tripura, India. It offers the Bachelor of Medicine and Surgery (MBBS) degree course. The college is recognized by the National Medical Commission and affiliated with the Tripura University. The hospital associated with this college is the Indira Gandhi Memorial (IGM) Hospital. This college is the first private medical college in the Tripura state under National medical commission Act. Tripura Santiniketan Medical College was recognized by the India Book of Records and the Asia Book of Records for its notable accomplishments in the field of medical education and innovation.
