= Tripura University =

Central university in Suryamaninagar, Tripura, India

- Motto: Pursuit of Excellence
- Type: Public research university
- Established: 1987; 39 years ago
- Academic affiliations: UGC; AICTE
- Chancellor: Ahmed Javed, IPS (Retd.)
- Vice-Chancellor: Dr. Debabrata Das
- Rector: Governor of Tripura
- Visitor: President of India
- Location: Suryamaninagar, Tripura, India; 23°45′40″N 91°15′58″E
- Campus: Rural
- Language: English, Bengali, Kokborok, Hindi
- Website: tripurauniv.ac.in

Tripura University is a public central research university, the main public government university of the state of Tripura in India.

== History ==
Higher education in Tripura has its beginning with Maharaja Bir Bikram College (MBBC), the first-degree college in the state, established in 1947, and affiliated to University of Calcutta. This was followed by Ramkrishna Mahavidyalaya in 1950, Iswar Chandra Vidyasagar College formerly known as Belonia College in 1964 and Ramthakur College in 1967, all affiliated to the CU. No postgraduate college existed in Tripura, until in 1967 the University Grants Commission (UGC) sanctioned a post-graduate wing of CU, named Calcutta University Post graduate Centre (CUPGC), established in 1985. In 1987 Tripura University was established through the Tripura University Act, on the grounds of CUPGC.

In 2007 Tripura University was elevated to a central university under the Tripura University Act, 2006. Sudip Bandopadhya was appointed the first chancellor and Arunoday Saha the first vice-chancellor (VC). Saha was followed by Anjan Kumar Ghosh, followed by Vijaykumar Laxmikantrao Dharurkar, who was appointed the third VC in July 2018. In September 2019, Dharurkar resigned over corruption allegations and was replaced by acting VC Sangram Sinha. Sinha was replaced by acting VC Mahesh Kumar Singh in January 2020, who remained in the position until August 2020, when Ganga Prasad Prasain was appointed VC.

== Location ==
The campus of Tripura University is situated at Suryamaninagar, 10 km away from the city centre of Agartala.

== Affiliated colleges ==
Notable affiliated colleges include:

- Agartala Government Medical College
- Ambedkar College, Fatikray
- Adwaita Malla Barman Smriti Mahavidyalaya, Amarpur
- College of Agriculture, Tripura
- Dasaratha Deb Memorial College
- Sachin Deb Barman Memorial Govt. Music College, Lichubagan
- Government College Of Arts & Craft, Lichubagan
- Government Degree College, Dharmanagar
- Government Degree College, Kamalpur
- Government Degree College, Kanchanpur
- Government Degree College, Khumulwng
- Government Degree College, Santirbazar
- Government Degree College, Teliamura
- Government Degree College, Gandacharra
- Government Degree College, Longtharai Valley
- Holy Cross College, Agartala
- Iswar Chandra Vidyasagar College, Belonia
- Kabi Nazrul Mahavidyalaya, Sonamura
- Michael Madhusudan Dutta College
- National Institute Of Electronics & Information Technology, Agartala
- Netaji Subhash Mahavidyalaya, Udaipur
- Rabindranath Thakur Mahavidyalaya, Bishalgarh
- Ramthakur College, Agartala
- Ramkrishna Mahavidyalaya, Kailashahar
- Regional Institute of Pharmaceutical Science And Technology (RIPSAT), Agartala
- Tripura Institute of Paramedical Sciences (Hapania, Agartala)
- Tripura Institute of Technology, Narsingarh
- Tripura Medical College & Dr. B.R. Ambedkar Memorial Teaching Hospital
- Tripura Santiniketan Medical College
- Tripura State Academy of Tribal Culture
- Women's College, Agartala
- Women's Polytechnic, Hapania

== Alumni ==
=== Arts ===
- Nanda Kumar Deb Barma, poet and playwright

=== Politics ===
- Manik Sarkar, 9th Chief Minister of Tripura
- Biplab Kumar Deb, 10th Chief Minister of Tripura
- Pratima Bhoumik, former MP from Tripura West
- Rebati Tripura, former MP from Tripura East
- Malina Debnath, former MLA from Jubarajnagar
- Sudip Roy Barman, MLA from Agartala
