= Jubarajnagar Assembly constituency =

Legislative Assembly constituency in Tripura State, India

Coordinates: 24.33°N 92.15°E

Jubarajnagar
- Constituency No. 57 for the Tripura Legislative Assembly

Constituency details
- Country: India
- Region: Northeast India
- State: Tripura
- District: North Tripura
- Lok Sabha constituency: Tripura East
- Established: 1972
- Total electors: 44,547
- Reservation: None

Member of Legislative Assembly
- 13th Tripura Legislative Assembly
- Incumbent Sailendra Chandra Nath
- Party: Communist Party of India (Marxist)
- Elected year: 2023

Jubarajnagar Legislative Assembly constituency is one of the 60 Legislative Assembly constituencies of Tripura state in India. It is part of North Tripura district.

== Members of the Legislative Assembly ==
| Election | Member | Party |
|---|---|---|
| 1972 | Monoranjan Nath | Indian National Congress |
| 1977 | Ram Kumar Nath | Communist Party of India |
| 1983 | Ram Kumar Nath | Communist Party of India |
| 1988 | Biva Rani Nath | Indian National Congress |
| 1993 | Ramendra Chandra Debnath | Communist Party of India |
| 1998 | Ramendra Chandra Debnath | Communist Party of India |
| 2003 | Ramendra Chandra Debnath | Communist Party of India |
| 2008 | Ramendra Chandra Debnath | Communist Party of India |
| 2013 | Ramendra Chandra Debnath | Communist Party of India |
| 2018 | Ramendra Chandra Debnath | Communist Party of India |
| 2022 by-election | Malina Debnath | Bharatiya Janata Party |
| 2023 | Sailendra Chandra Nath | Communist Party of India |

== Election results ==
=== 2023 Assembly election ===
2023 Tripura Legislative Assembly election: Jubarajnagar
| Party | Candidate | Votes | % | ±% |
|---|---|---|---|---|
| CPI(M) | Sailendra Chandra Nath | 19,386 | 49.29% | ▲9.66 |
| BJP | Malina Debnath | 19,090 | 48.54% | ▼3.86 |
| NOTA | None of the Above | 853 | 2.17% | ▲1.07 |
| Margin of victory | | 296 | 0.75% | ▼12.01 |
| Turnout | | 39,329 | 88.34% | ▲6.00 |
| Registered electors | | 44,547 | | ▲2.33 |
| CPI(M) gain from BJP | | Swing | ▼3.10 | |

=== 2022 Assembly by-election ===
2022 Tripura Legislative Assembly by-election: Jubarajnagar
| Party | Candidate | Votes | % | ±% |
|---|---|---|---|---|
| BJP | Malina Debnath | 18,769 | 52.40% | ▲5.60 |
| CPI(M) | Sailendra Chandra Nath | 14,197 | 39.63% | New |
| INC | Susmita Debnath | 1,440 | 4.02% | ▲2.18 |
| AITC | Mrinal Kanti Debnath | 1,080 | 3.01% | ▲2.28 |
| NOTA | None of the Above | 394 | 1.10% | New |
| Independent | Bijoy Debnath | 335 | 0.94% | New |
| Margin of victory | | 4,572 | 12.76% | ▲11.03 |
| Turnout | | 35,821 | 81.90% | ▼8.93 |
| Registered electors | | 43,533 | | ▲6.21 |
| BJP gain from CPI(M) | | Swing | ▲3.86 | |

=== 2018 Assembly election ===
2018 Tripura Legislative Assembly election: Jubarajnagar
| Party | Candidate | Votes | % | ±% |
|---|---|---|---|---|
| CPI(M) | Ramendra Chandra Debnath | 18,147 | 48.54% | ▼4.65 |
| BJP | Jadab Lal Debnath | 17,498 | 46.80% | ▲44.95 |
| INC | Digbijoy Chakraborty | 689 | 1.84% | ▼43.12 |
| AITC | Ratneshbar Debnath | 275 | 0.74% | New |
| NOTA | None of the Above | 259 | 0.69% | New |
| AMB | Ramesh Chandra Debnath | 242 | 0.65% | New |
| Margin of victory | | 649 | 1.74% | ▼6.49 |
| Turnout | | 37,388 | 90.59% | ▼2.75 |
| Registered electors | | 40,987 | | |
| CPI(M) hold | | Swing | ▼4.65 | |

=== 2013 Assembly election ===
2013 Tripura Legislative Assembly election: Jubarajnagar
| Party | Candidate | Votes | % | ±% |
|---|---|---|---|---|
| CPI(M) | Ramendra Chandra Debnath | 18,602 | 53.19% | ▲1.97 |
| INC | Ranadhir Nath | 15,724 | 44.96% | ▼0.63 |
| BJP | Pijush Nath | 648 | 1.85% | ▲0.11 |
| Margin of victory | | 2,878 | 8.23% | ▲2.60 |
| Turnout | | 34,974 | 94.00% | ▲1.02 |
| Registered electors | | 37,220 | | |
| CPI(M) hold | | Swing | | |

=== 2008 Assembly election ===
2008 Tripura Legislative Assembly election: Jubarajnagar
| Party | Candidate | Votes | % | ±% |
|---|---|---|---|---|
| CPI(M) | Ramendra Chandra Debnath | 14,710 | 51.22% | ▲1.61 |
| INC | Biva Rani Nath | 13,094 | 45.59% | ▼1.51 |
| BJP | Pijush Nath | 500 | 1.74% | New |
| AMB | Ramesh Chandra Debnath | 415 | 1.45% | ▼0.71 |
| Margin of victory | | 1,616 | 5.63% | ▲3.12 |
| Turnout | | 28,719 | 92.95% | ▲12.67 |
| Registered electors | | 30,898 | | ▲2.82 |
| CPI(M) hold | | Swing | ▲1.61 | |

=== 2003 Assembly election ===
2003 Tripura Legislative Assembly election: Jubarajnagar
| Party | Candidate | Votes | % | ±% |
|---|---|---|---|---|
| CPI(M) | Ramendra Chandra Debnath | 11,967 | 49.61% | ▲3.96 |
| INC | Biva Rani Nath | 11,363 | 47.10% | ▲2.83 |
| AMB | Ranjan Debnath | 521 | 2.16% | ▲1.38 |
| AITC | Pijush Kanti Dhar | 272 | 1.13% | New |
| Margin of victory | | 604 | 2.50% | ▲1.12 |
| Turnout | | 24,123 | 80.33% | ▼0.47 |
| Registered electors | | 30,051 | | ▲16.65 |
| CPI(M) hold | | Swing | ▲3.96 | |

=== 1998 Assembly election ===
1998 Tripura Legislative Assembly election: Jubarajnagar
| Party | Candidate | Votes | % | ±% |
|---|---|---|---|---|
| CPI(M) | Ramendra Chandra Debnath | 9,496 | 45.65% | ▼5.59 |
| INC | Biva Rani Nath | 9,209 | 44.27% | ▲5.53 |
| BJP | Manik Debnath | 1,824 | 8.77% | ▲1.47 |
| AMB | Digendra Chandra Debnath | 163 | 0.78% | ▼1.18 |
| Margin of victory | | 287 | 1.38% | ▼11.12 |
| Turnout | | 20,802 | 82.42% | ▼1.14 |
| Registered electors | | 25,762 | | ▲5.68 |
| CPI(M) hold | | Swing | ▼5.59 | |

=== 1993 Assembly election ===
1993 Tripura Legislative Assembly election: Jubarajnagar
| Party | Candidate | Votes | % | ±% |
|---|---|---|---|---|
| CPI(M) | Ramendra Chandra Debnath | 10,228 | 51.24% | ▲5.47 |
| INC | Biva Nath | 7,732 | 38.74% | ▼8.21 |
| BJP | Rajendra Prasad Nath | 1,456 | 7.29% | New |
| AMB | Digendra Nath | 392 | 1.96% | New |
| Independent | Barindra Nath | 126 | 0.63% | New |
| Margin of victory | | 2,496 | 12.50% | ▲11.32 |
| Turnout | | 19,961 | 82.79% | ▼3.35 |
| Registered electors | | 24,377 | | ▲28.51 |
| CPI(M) gain from INC | | Swing | ▲4.29 | |

=== 1988 Assembly election ===
1988 Tripura Legislative Assembly election: Jubarajnagar
| Party | Candidate | Votes | % | ±% |
|---|---|---|---|---|
| INC | Biva Rani Nath | 7,591 | 46.95% | ▲30.46 |
| CPI(M) | Ram Kumar Nath | 7,400 | 45.77% | ▲0.53 |
| Independent | Digendra Chandra Nath | 972 | 6.01% | New |
| Independent | Adwaita Deb Nath | 206 | 1.27% | New |
| Margin of victory | | 191 | 1.18% | ▼12.59 |
| Turnout | | 16,169 | 86.31% | ▲2.33 |
| Registered electors | | 18,969 | | ▲17.11 |
| INC gain from CPI(M) | | Swing | ▲1.71 | |

=== 1983 Assembly election ===
1983 Tripura Legislative Assembly election: Jubarajnagar
| Party | Candidate | Votes | % | ±% |
|---|---|---|---|---|
| CPI(M) | Ram Kumar Nath | 6,074 | 45.23% | ▼10.97 |
| Independent | Prasanna Kumar Nath | 4,225 | 31.46% | New |
| INC | Monoranjan Nath | 2,214 | 16.49% | ▲11.17 |
| Independent | Dilip Roy | 837 | 6.23% | New |
| BJP | Rai Mohan Singha | 78 | 0.58% | New |
| Margin of victory | | 1,849 | 13.77% | ▼22.57 |
| Turnout | | 13,428 | 84.50% | ▲3.77 |
| Registered electors | | 16,197 | | ▲12.93 |
| CPI(M) hold | | Swing | ▼10.97 | |

=== 1977 Assembly election ===
1977 Tripura Legislative Assembly election: Jubarajnagar
| Party | Candidate | Votes | % | ±% |
|---|---|---|---|---|
| CPI(M) | Ram Kumar Nath | 6,379 | 56.21% | ▲26.56 |
| TPCC | Manoranjan Nath | 2,255 | 19.87% | New |
| JP | Dilip Roy | 2,112 | 18.61% | New |
| INC | Paresh Chandra Paul | 603 | 5.31% | ▼46.06 |
| Margin of victory | | 4,124 | 36.34% | ▲14.62 |
| Turnout | | 11,349 | 80.62% | ▲16.62 |
| Registered electors | | 14,342 | | ▲21.94 |
| CPI(M) gain from INC | | Swing | ▲4.83 | |

=== 1972 Assembly election ===
1972 Tripura Legislative Assembly election: Jubarajnagar
| Party | Candidate | Votes | % | ±% |
|---|---|---|---|---|
| INC | Monoranjan Nath | 3,777 | 51.37% | New |
| CPI(M) | Ram Kumar Nath | 2,180 | 29.65% | New |
| Independent | Dharani Ranjan Das | 990 | 13.47% | New |
| AIFB | Jayanarayan Garery | 322 | 4.38% | New |
| Independent | Amiya Kanti Chowdhury | 83 | 1.13% | New |
| Margin of victory | | 1,597 | 21.72% | |
| Turnout | | 7,352 | 65.03% | |
| Registered electors | | 11,762 | | |
| INC win (new seat) | | | | |

== See also ==
- List of constituencies of the Tripura Legislative Assembly
- North Tripura district
