= Tripura Medical College & Dr. B.R. Ambedkar Memorial Teaching Hospital =

Medical college in Tripura, India

Tripura Medical College & Dr. B. R. Ambedkar Memorial Teaching Hospital
- Motto: Serve the Nation, with medical education
- Type: Medical College
- Established: August 27, 2006
- Affiliations: National Medical Commission
- Academic affiliations: Tripura University
- Chairman: Dr. Promotesh Roy
- Principal: Dr. Arindam Datta
- Administrative staff: 132
- Undergraduates: 150 intake/year
- Postgraduates: 18
- Location: Agartala, Tripura, India; 23.785°N 91.259°E
- Campus: Urban
- Website: tripuramedicalcollege.ac.in

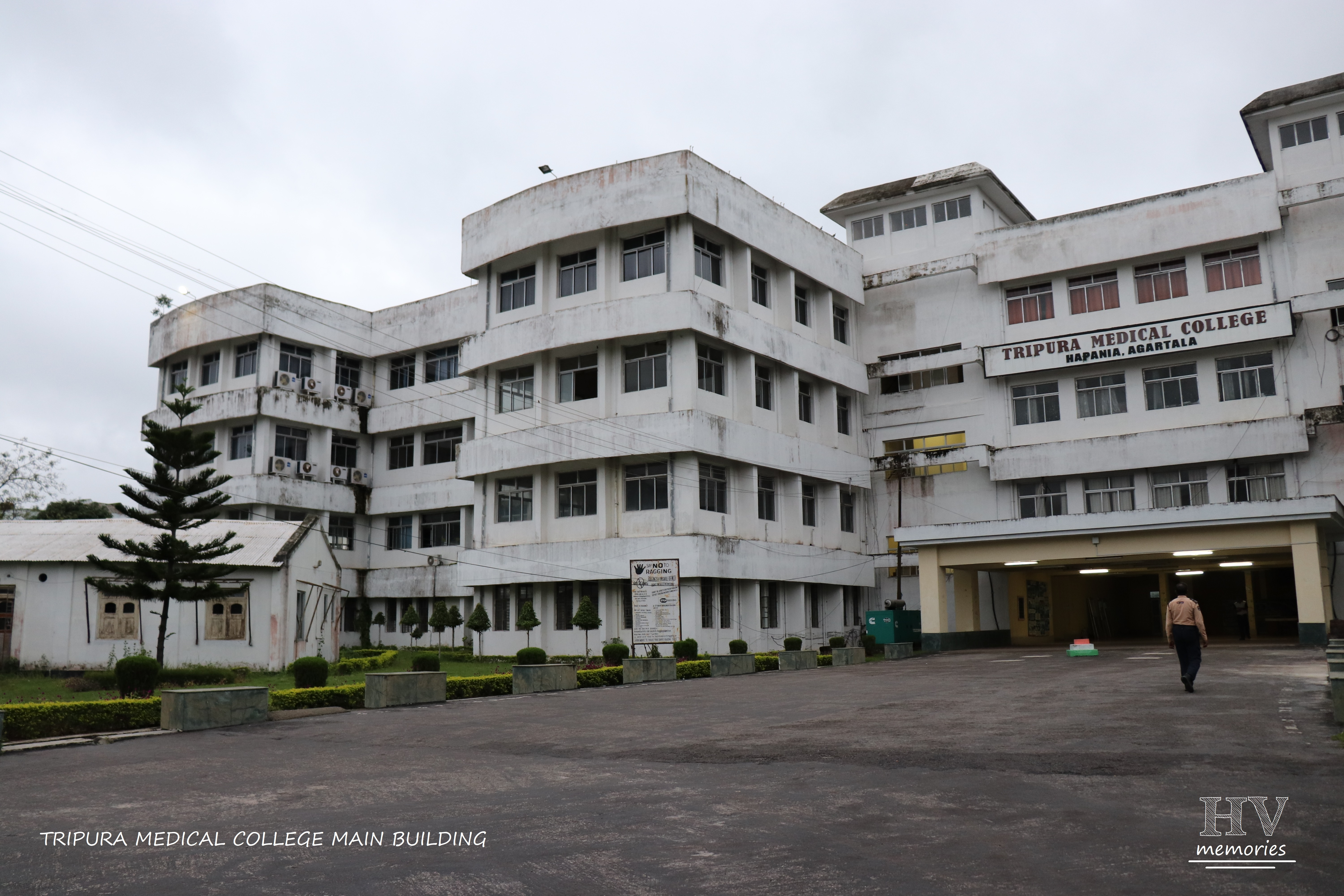
Academic Building

Tripura Medical College & Dr. B.R. Ambedkar Memorial Teaching Hospital or TMC is a Private Medical College (run by a society, SFTMC: Society For Tripura Medical College). The society was formed by Tripura Government with representation of members from the college & the Government. TMC is located in the capital town of Tripura, Agartala, India. The college operates the hospital known as Dr. B. R. Ambedkar Memorial Teaching Hospital (previously district hospital.) within the campus. The campus is located at Hapania under West Tripura district.

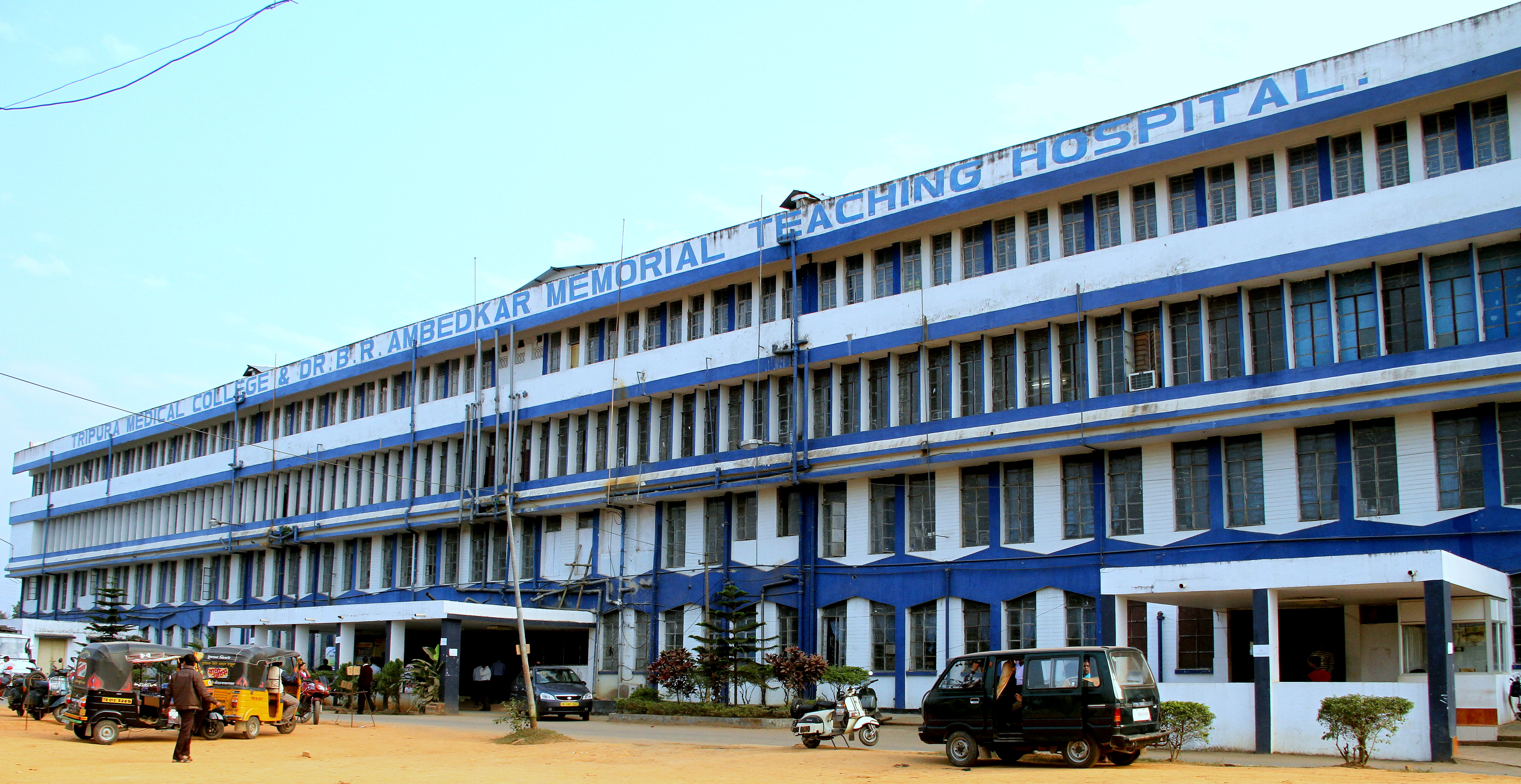
Façade of the hospital building

== History ==
The college was established in 2005 by the Government of Tripura and Global Educational Net (GENET) in a Public-Private Partnership, the first venture of its kind in India. But it received its first NMC permission for admission of students into M.B.B.S. course in 2006. However, during the month of April–May 2009, due to some reasons the GENET expressed their inability to run the institution any further. At that time 200 students were pursuing the M.B.B.S course from there. So, then Government of Tripura decided to run the college through a society and registered a society in the name and style of "Society for Tripura Medical College" on 23 May 2009.

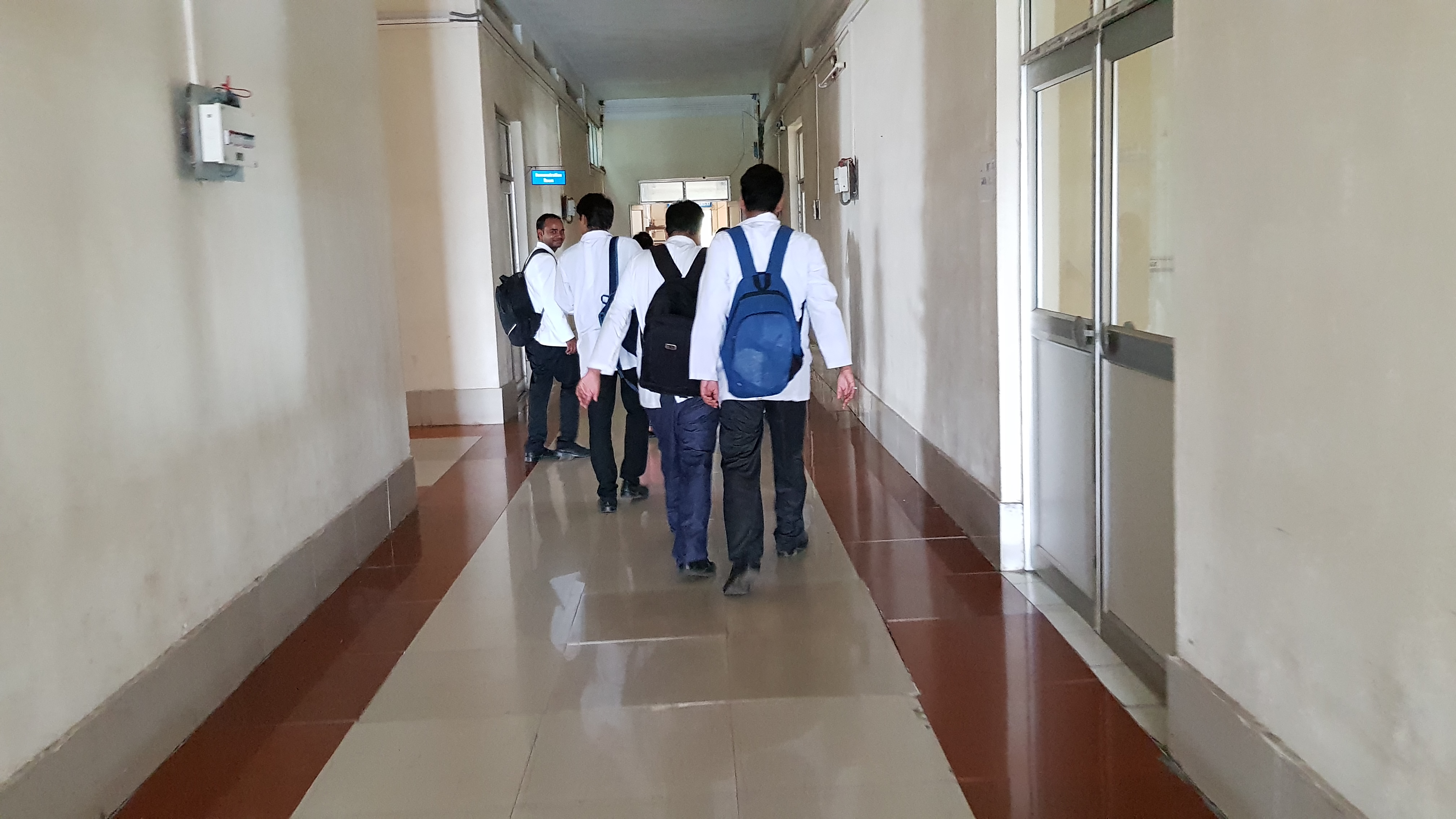
View outside Class

== Campus ==
The college is spread over an area of 31 acres (approx.). The college has a 490 bedded hospital with various facilities like NICU, PICU, ICU, ICCU, and Burn Unit, Blood-bank. It has a 24-hour emergency service. The academic building is complete with all the Pre-clinical and Para-clinical departments with well-equipped laboratory and departmental museums and the Principals Office and the Central Library. There are many other buildings coming up in the campus like the new OPD block with all modern facilities and expectedly the first of its kind in North-east India, the auditorium building is noteworthy.

== Organization and administration ==
=== Departments ===
The college has the following departments

- Anatomy
- Physiology
- Biochemistry
- Pathology
- Microbiology
- Pharmacology
- Forensic Medicine
- Community Medicine
- ENT
- Ophthalmology
- Medicine
- Surgery
- Obstetrics & Gynaecology
- Pediatrics
- Psychiatry
- Anesthesiology
- Radiodiagnosis
- Tuberculosis & Respiratory Diseases (Chest Medicine)
- Dentistry
- Dermatology, STD & Leprosy
- Orthopaedics & Physical Medicine and Rehabilitation

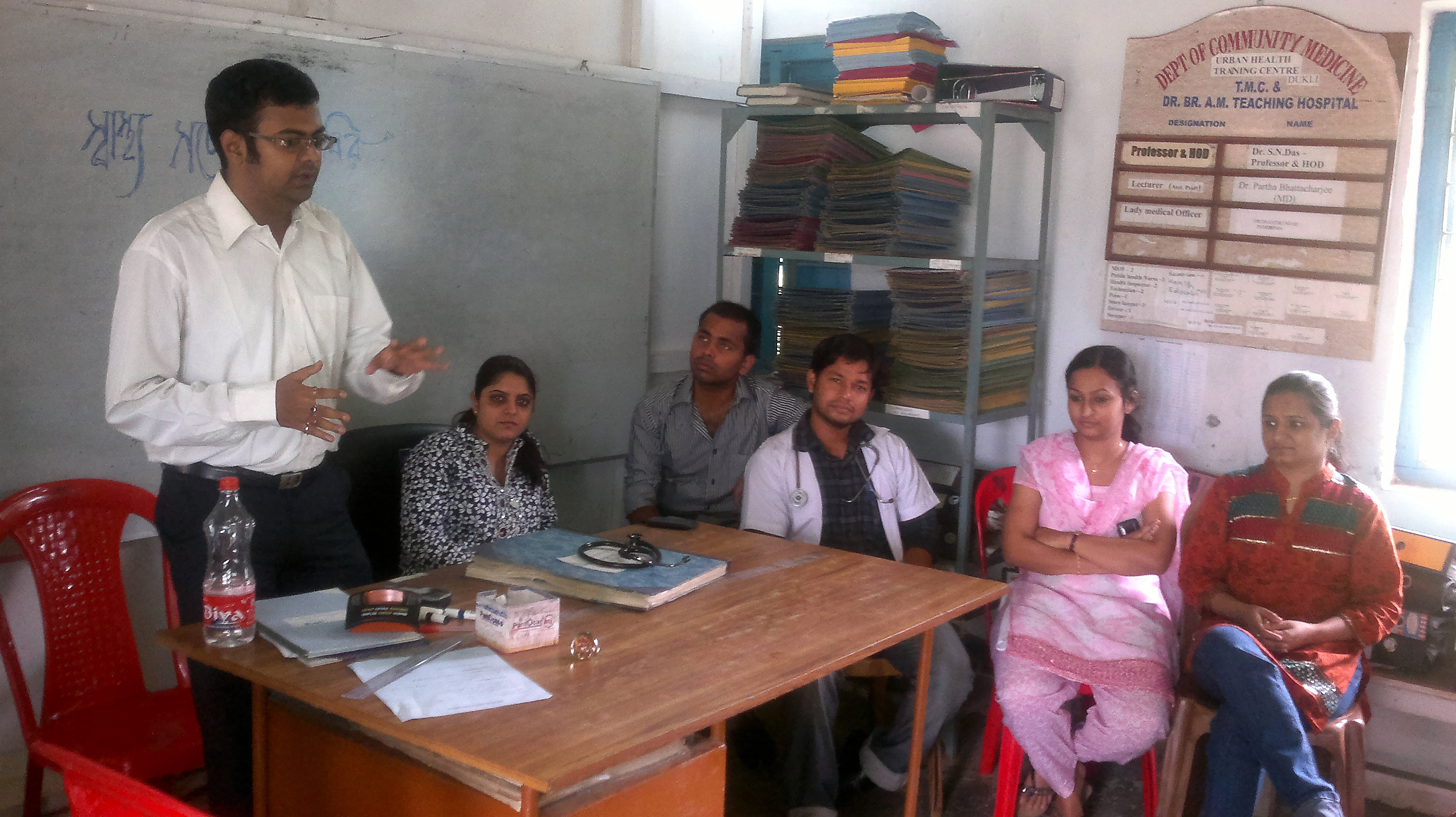
Tripura Medical College interns imparting health education to rural people

=== Super Specialty Departments ===
The college runs various Super Specialty departments like

- Pediatric Surgery
- Total Joint Replacement Surgery (Hip replacement, Knee replacement, Arthroscopic Surgery, etc.)
- Phaco Surgery
- Facio-Maxillary Surgery
- Urology
- Endoscopy
- Haemo Dialysis
- Cardiology
- Nephrology Clinic
- Ultra Modern Intensive Care Unit
- Modernized 30 bedded Dialysis Unit one of a kind in NE India
- Modern, Equipped and Air Conditioned Cabins.

== Academics ==
=== Admission ===
The college has an annual intake of 150 students for the MBBS course out of which 20 seats are reserved for All India Quota NEET National Eligibility cum Entrance Test (Undergraduate).

=== Affiliation ===
The college is affiliated to Tripura University, a central university. The college is recognized by the National Medical Commission and Government of India and the college is also enlisted in the International Medical Education Directory.

=== Post-Graduation ===
The college has started post-graduation courses (MD/MS) permitted u/s 10A of the IMC Act’1956 from 2013 to 2014 academic year in the following departments

Pharmacology (MD) 01 (one), Pathology (MD) 01 (one), General Medicine (MD) 02 (two) & E.N.T (MS) 02 (one).

In the year 2024 NMC approved Ophthalmology (MS) 02 (two) seats.

Further in 2025 Pediatrics (MD) 02 (two), Biochemistry (MD), 02 (two), Community Medicine (MD) 02 (two) have been approved with approval of additional 04 (four) seats in General Medicine (MD)

== Student life ==
The campus is filled with abundant vegetation, making it a green oasis. Currently, students from all over the country study here, creating a diverse and inclusive atmosphere. The campus is always abuzz with various activities, which keep it vibrant. Every year, TMC students organize a festival called 'NEURON'; they also host a freshers' welcome event known as 'EMBRYION'—an initiative that has set a new trend in the region.Students organize blood donation camps. Additionally, they conduct various health awareness camps for the rural population living in the vicinity of the college. In the MBBS examinations held by Tripura University, students have repeatedly achieved distinction, securing the first position on several occasions as well as attaining various other top ranks.
