= Maharaja Bir Bikram College =

Public college in Agartala, Tripura, India

- Motto: Sanskrit: Vidyayamrtamasnute
- Motto in English: Knowledge is the key to immortality
- Type: Public
- Established: September 9, 1947; 78 years ago
- Founder: Maharani Kanchan Prava Devi
- Accreditation: UGC
- Affiliations: Maharaja Bir Bikram University
- Principal: Dr. Nirmal Bhadra
- Location: College Tilla, Agartala, Tripura, 799004, India; 23.8277304°N 91.297742°E
- Campus: Urban, 264 acres (107 ha)
- Language: English, Kokborok, Bengali, Hindi
- Colours: MBBC Yellow and MBBC Brown
- Website: www.mbbcollege.in

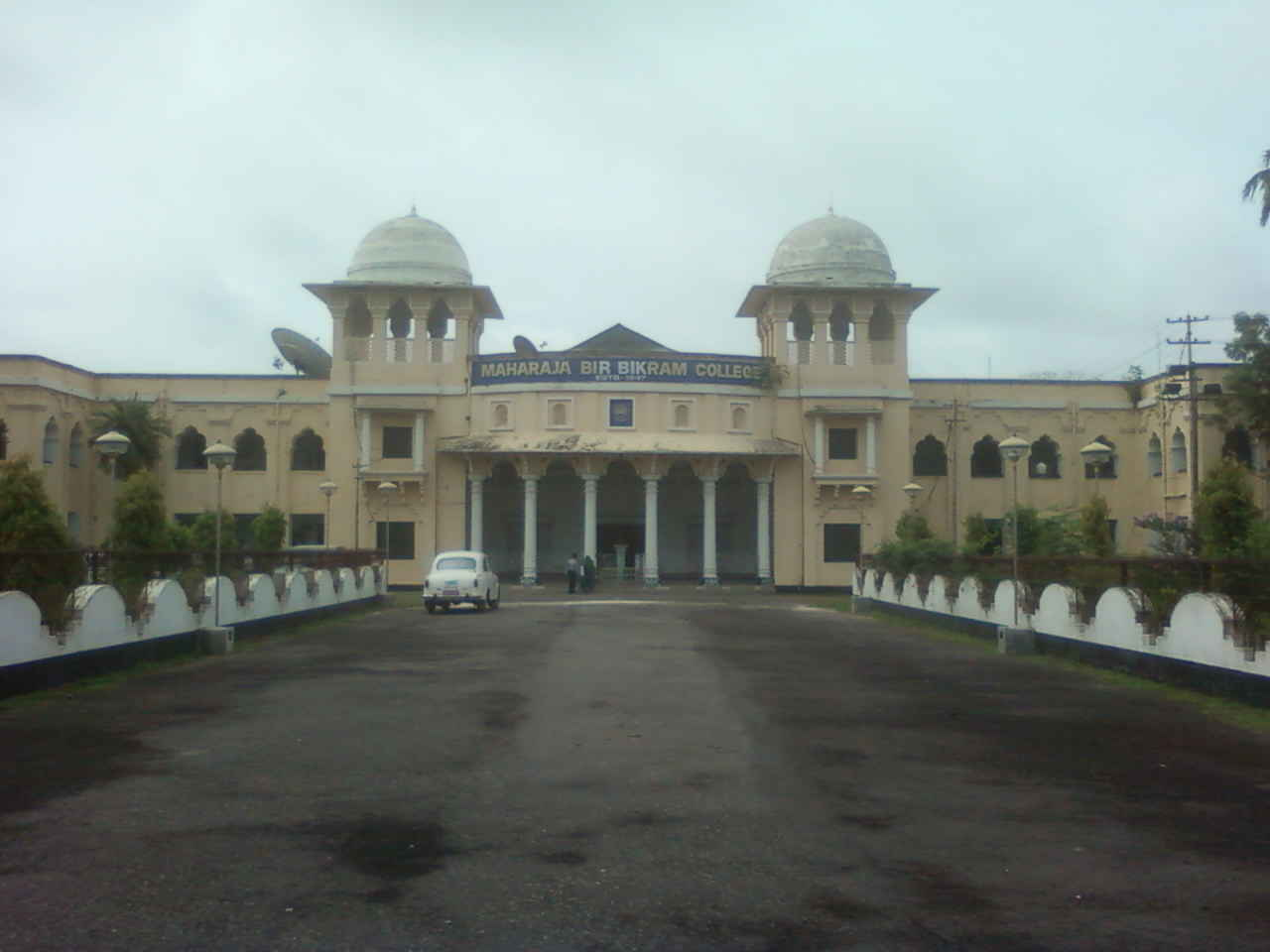
Front view of Maharaja Bir Bikram College

Maharaja Bir Bikram College or MBB College is a degree college of the Indian state of Tripura, imparting general education in the streams of Science, Commerce and Humanities. Established on 9 September 1947, it is the oldest college in the state of Tripura with a campus spread over 264 acres (107 ha). It is located approximately 3 km (1.9 mi) from the city center. The motto of the college is "Vidyayamrtamasnute" (Knowledge is the key to immortality). The college is named after former Maharaja of Tripura State, Bir Bikram Manikya Bahadur.

== History ==
Maharaja Bir Bikram Manikya Bahadur, the last king of Tripura, was the architect and founder of this college which was affiliated to University of Calcutta. The king had planned to establish a college at Agartala as early as 1937. An area of 254 acres of land (mostly khas land and small acquired position) was earmarked for the college in the eastern part of the-then small capital town of Agartala. It was given the name "Vidyapattan". Construction began in 1937 for which a trustee board was formed. The construction had to be abandoned when World War II broke out and the ground floor was converted into an army hospital for British Army moving to and from Burma. Maharaja Bir Bikram College (MBB College) started functioning in 1947 to meet the needs of college students who had migrated to Tripura from erstwhile East Pakistan. The-then Regent, Kanchan Prava Devi, responded to the needs of these uprooted Bengali students and almost overnight obtained the affiliation of Calcutta University for IA, ISC, BA and BCOM examination.

== Campus ==
The college campus has an area of over 254 acres. This includes the college faculties and the central library.

== Departments ==
The institute has the following departments:

- Arts group
  - Bengali
  - Education
  - English
  - Hindi
  - Kokborok
  - Philosophy
  - Physical Education
  - Psychology
  - NCC
  - Sanskrit
  - Sociology
- Social Science group
  - Geography
  - Political Science
  - Economics
  - History

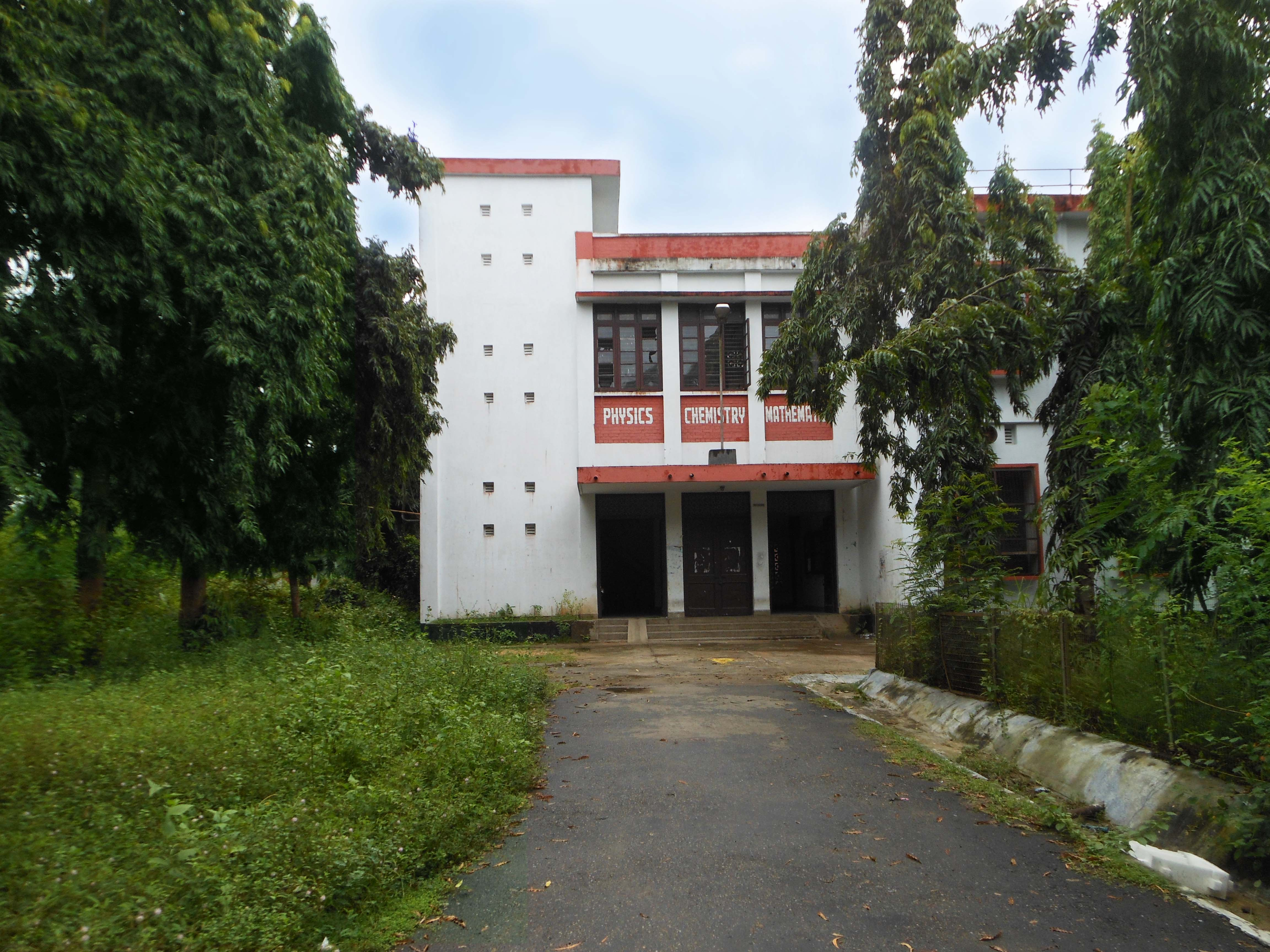
Physics, Chemistry, Mathematics, Statistics and Biology department

- Biological Science group
  - Botany
  - Environmental Science
  - Human Physiology
  - Zoology
- Physical Science group
  - Chemistry
  - IT & Computer Science
  - Mathematics
  - Physics
  - Statistics
- Commerce group
  - Commerce
