= Agartala Government Medical College =

Medical College in Agartala, Tripura, India

- Motto: Service Humanity Devotion
- Type: Public
- Established: August 1, 2005; 21 years ago
- Affiliations: National Medical Commission
- Academic affiliations: Tripura University
- Principal: Dr. Tapan Majumder
- Academic staff: 216
- Students: UG - 250 students per batch, from academic session 2026-27
- Undergraduates: 250 , from academic session 2026-27
- Postgraduates: 153
- Location: Agartala, Tripura, India
- Campus: Urban
- Website: https://agmc.ac.in/

Agartala Government Medical College (AGMC) is a government medical college located on the lap of Agartala, the capital city of Tripura. It is situated in the Kunjaban area of north Agartala, directly adjacent to the New Capital Complex, which houses the State Civil Secretariat, the Chief Minister's Office, state ministerial departments, the Tripura Legislative Assembly, the High Court of Tripura, and Lok Bhavan (formerly Raj Bhavan).Also, located near to the Malancha Niwas, a historic bungalow where Rabindranath Tagore stayed during his visits to Agartala. The college is attached with the Govind Ballabh Pant Hospital, a major public tertiary care and teaching hospital and a designated Level II Trauma Centre that functions as the primary referral hub for the entire state of Tripura, drawing over 2,000 daily outpatients from remote, sub-divisional, and district regions who require high-end diagnostics and complex surgeries. The original foundation stone of the GBP Hospital in Agartala was laid in 1961 by Govind Ballabh Pant, who was serving as the Union Home Minister of India at the time. The hospital complex was completed within a few years of that ceremony and named in his honour. Constructed on the land donated by Kirit Bir Bikram Manikya Bahadur of the royal dynasty, the hospital has a storied history, notably acting as a vital lifeline for thousands of injured Bangladesh liberation warriors (Muktijoddhas) during the 1971 war. In recent years, the hospital has undergone significant modernisations, including the opening of an expanded Super Speciality Block, newly expanded intensive care units (ICUs) and Critical Care Units, a new Geriatric Ward, and a new building extension scheduled for completion by 2027 to drastically reduce waiting lists and reliance on hospitals outside the state. As of now, this hospital has a total capacity of 1,413 functional beds. It is run and funded by the Government of Tripura.

Main Academic Building of the Agartala Government Medical College at night

== History ==
The college was established in 2005 and the foundation stone was laid by the Prime Minister of India, Manmohan Singh. The college is recognised by the National Medical Commission (NMC), run and maintained by the Government of Tripura and is affiliated to Tripura University.

Super Specialty Block of this Medical College

== Campus ==
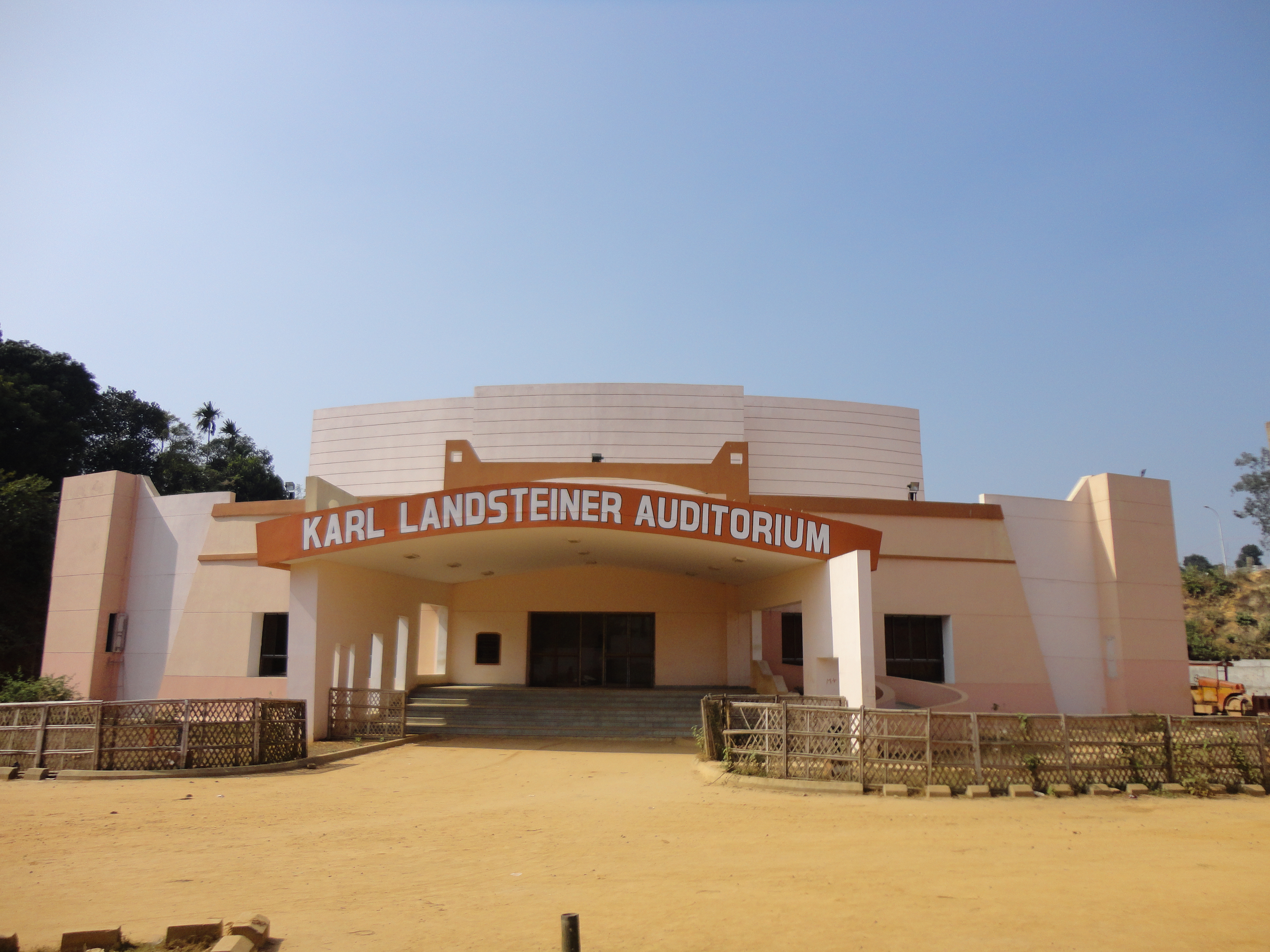
Karl Landsteiner Auditorium(Back in the year 2012)

The Medical College campus is spread over 42 acres of land. It includes :

- Administrative Building with 5 Lecture Halls(Lecture Hall 4, or LH4, is the largest of all the lecture halls)
- A 300-320 capacity UG Boys’ Hostel.
- 200-216 capacity UG Girls’ Hostel.
- 40 capacity Girls’ Intern.
- 60 capacity Boys' Intern.
- 350 capacity Nurses' Hostel.
- 200 capacity Resident Doctors' Hostel.
- PG Hostel
- 132 units of staff quarters for Associate Professor / Assistant Professor / Tutor / Sr. Residents. 96 Units of Staff quarters for Jr. Resident / Technical Assistant etc. and 12 units of Staff quarter for Professor.
- A 660 sitting capacity Auditorium named after Karl Landsteiner who discovered ABO blood grouping.
- A Gymnasium equipped with modern Instruments.
- The AGMC annual festival "Phoenix" , a 7-day mega event is one of the biggest college fests of the state.
- Play Ground and a Branch of a Bank with ATM facility.

Entrance gate of AGMC.

Main Academic Building (Left) and Trauma Care Centre (Right)

== Departments ==
- Anatomy
- Physiology
- Biochemistry
- Pathology
- Pharmacology
- Microbiology
- Forensic Medicine and Toxicology
- Community Medicine
- Ophthalmology
- Otorhinolaryngology
- General Medicine
- General Surgery
- Obstetrics & Gynaecology
- Pediatrics
- Psychiatry
- Anaesthesiology
- Radiodiagnosis
- Orthopedics
- Tuberculosis & Respiratory Medicine (Chest Medicine)
- Dentistry
- Dermatology, STD & Leprosy
- Casualty
- Trauma
- Neurosurgery (SS)
- Urology (SS)
- Plastic Surgery (SS)
- Nephrology (SS)
- Cardiology (SS)
- Neurology (SS)
- CTVS (SS)
- Radiation Oncology (ABV-RCC)

== Fests ==
Phoenix - Phoenix is the annual cultural, literary, and sports festival of Agartala Government Medical College (AGMC) in Agartala, Tripura. Features live musical performances, cultural nights, literary competitions, and high-energy sports events. Typically runs as a multi-day mega event (such as Phoenix '25 held from December 19–23, 2025) organized by the AGMC Student's Council and Resident Doctors' Association (RDA)

SYNAPSE is the annual freshers' welcome celebration of Agartala Government Medical College (AGMC) in Agartala, Tripura, India, organised by the AGMC Students' Council to formally welcome the incoming first-year MBBS batch. Held annually between late September and mid-December following NEET-UG admissions and the first-year Foundation Course—including recent editions on 10–11 December 2025 and 21 November 2026—the event has also been hosted alongside the college's cultural festival under the banner SYNAPSE. The celebration typically features cultural performances such as dance, music, and skits by both freshers and senior students, interactive ice-breaker sessions, introduction and task sessions and the crowning of Mr. and Miss Fresher.

== Academics ==
Nighttime view of the Agartala Government Medical College and Govind Ballabh Pant (GBP) Hospital complex, highlighting the hospital buildings, the side view of the main academic building, and the surrounding campus roadways.

=== Seat distribution of MBBS ===
The annual intake of students for the course of MBBS is 250(From Academic Session 2026-27) divided as follows:

- 212 students from the state of Tripura who qualify through the State Quota of National Eligibility and Entrance Test (NEET).This 212 seats in further divided as follow:
1. UR-89
2. SC -36
3. ST-66
4. EWS-21

5% horizontal seat reservation for PWD students (As per guidelines of eligibility), and few seats reserved for the Wards of Ex-servicemen(WESM)

- 38 students from the Central Pool who qualify through the 15% All India Quota (AIQ) of National Eligibility and Entrance Test (NEET). This seat is further divided as below:
1. UR - 15 (including 1 PH)
2. SC- 6 ( including 1 PH)
3. ST-3
4. OBC-10
5. EWS-4
- 10 students from the rest of North East. As a gesture of good will the Government of Tripura has offered ten seats from its quota to four North-Eastern States, viz. Mizoram (two seats), Nagaland (three seats), Meghalaya (three seats) and Arunachal Pradesh (two seats) as there is a shortage of medical seats in those states.

==== Admission ====
A candidate who has completed the age of 17 years on or before 31 December of the corresponding year is eligible for admission. Date of birth as recorded in the Madhyamik / 10th Standard / School Leaving Certificate issued by the concerned Board of Education will be taken as authentic.

Candidates must have passed the Higher Secondary Examination or the Indian School Certificate Examination which is equivalent to 10+2 Higher Secondary Examination after a period of 12 years of study with at least 45% marks, the last two years of study consisting of Physics, Chemistry and Biology or any other elective subjects with English at a level not less than core course of English. All or any such examination must be recognised by the Tripura University for the purpose of admission.

All candidates should appear in the NEET, conducted by NTA for admission to this Medical College.

Admission in state quota seats(85% of the total seats) will be as per the registered candidates merit list of the candidates who have appeared for the neet exam during that academic session and have a valid PRTC (Permanent Resident of Tripura Certificate), prepared by the Tripura Medical Counseling Committee.

Admission in All India Quota seats (15% of the total seats) will be through MCC AIQ Counselling.

Admission in North East quota will be through Medical State Quota Seats Counselling of respective states and will be conducted by Medical Counselling Committee of that state.

All admissions are subject to verification of the original certificates / documents produced by the candidates at the time of admission.

Regarding the eligibility of any applicant, the decision of the Tripura Medical Counselling Committee, Govt. of Tripura and the Directorate of Medical Education as per the NMC guidelines, shall be final.

All admissions are subject to Medical Fitness of the candidate.

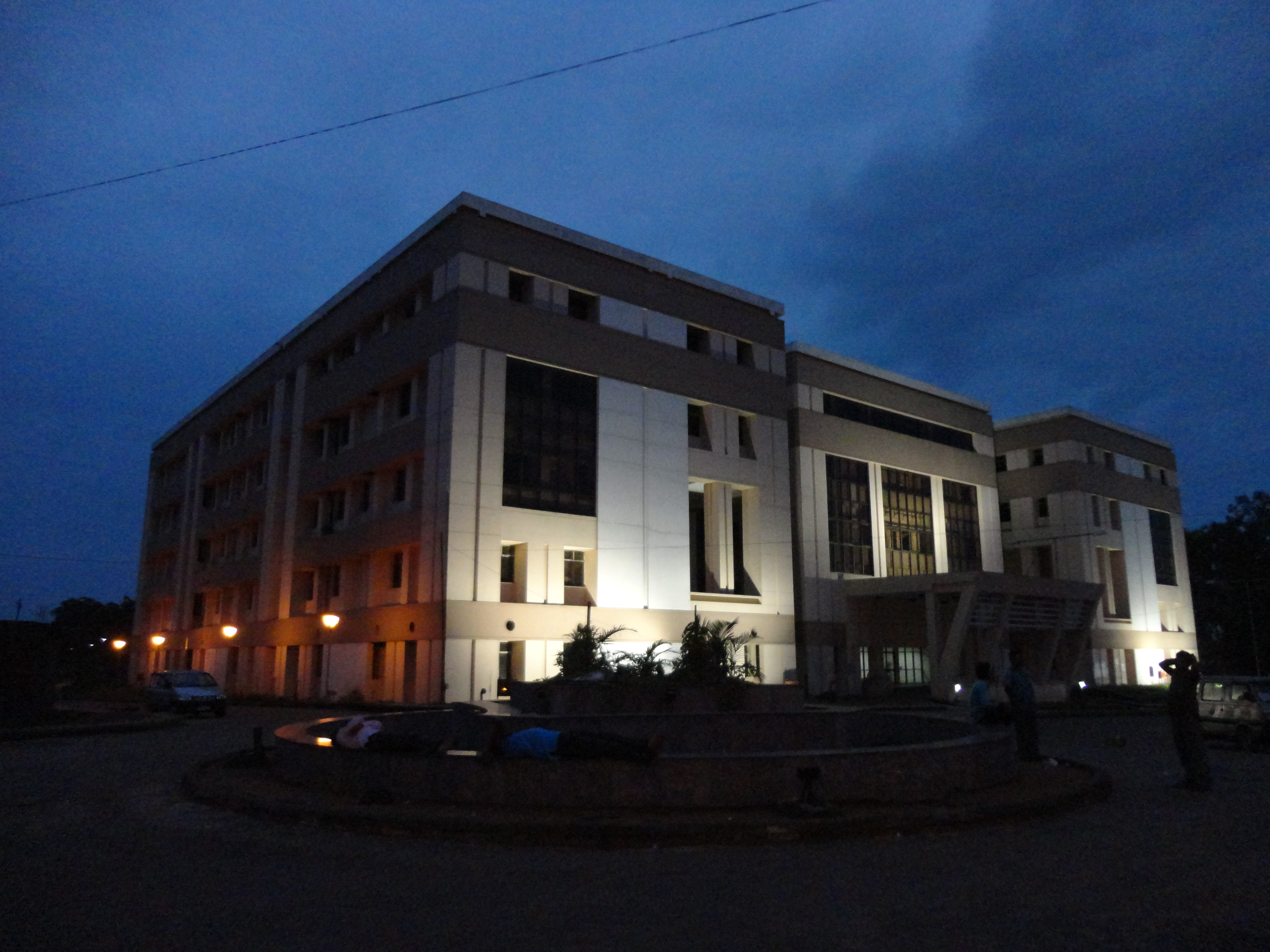
AGMC Main Academic Building at Night, back in the year 2012.

- Academic Calendar

Commencement of classes	By the last week of September
Duration of Semesters	Six Months
Course Duration	Four & Half Year
Internship	1 year

- Distribution of subjects by Proffesional phase

MBBS	Name Of Subject
1st Proffesional MBBS	•Foundation Course •Anatomy, Physiology & Bio Chemistry, Introduction to Community Medicine •AETCOM •Early Clinical Exposure
2nd Professional MBBS	•Pharmacology, Pathology, Microbiology, Forensic Medicine & Toxicology •Introduction to Clinical Subjects including Community Medicine •Clinical Postings • AETCOM
3rd Proffesional MBBS (Part I)	•General Medicine, General Surgery, Paediatrics, Orthopedics, Obstetrics & Gynaecology, Psychiatry, Otorhinolaryngology, Ophthalmology, Community Medicine, Respiratory Medicine, Radio-diagnosis, Radiotherapy, Anesthesiology, Forensic Medicine & Toxicology •Clinical subjects/postings •AETCOM
3rd Proffesional MBBS (Part II)	•General Medicine, Surgery, Paediatrics, Obstetrics & Gynaecology including Family Welfare and allied specialties. •Clinical subjects/postings •AETCOM

=== Compulsory Rotating Medical Internship ===
Upon completing the undergraduate curriculum, MBBS students undergo a mandatory one-calendar-year Compulsory Rotating Medical Internship (CRMI) during which interns receive a stipend from the college. While no university examinations are conducted during this period, interns are continuously evaluated on attendance, clinical skills, conduct, and performance by their supervising faculty members and respective Heads of Departments.

Independent assessments are also carried out by the Medical Superintendent of Govind Ballabh Pant (GBP) Hospital and the Principal of the college. Upon satisfactory evaluation, the institution issues a completion certificate, which is mandatory for obtaining permanent medical registration from the National Medical Commission (formerly the Medical Council of India) to practice medicine in India.

Time Distribution of Internship

Department / Specialty	Duration
Community Medicine (Residential posting)	2 months
General Medicine (including 15 days of Psychiatry)	2 months
General Surgery (including 15 days of Anaesthesia)	2 months
Obstetrics & Gynaecology (including Family Welfare Planning)	2 months
Pediatrics	1 month
Orthopaedics (including PM & R)	1 month
Otorhinolaryngology	15 days
Ophthalmology	15 days
Casualty	15 days
Elective posting (1 × 15 days)	15 days

==== Elective posting subjects ====
Interns complete one 15-day elective rotation chosen from the following departments:

1. Dermatology (Dermatology, Venereology & Leprosy)
2. Respiratory Medicine
3. Radio-diagnosis
4. Forensic Medicine & Toxicology
5. Blood Bank
6. Psychiatry

Postgraduate Education

Agartala Government Medical College & Govind Ballabh Pant (GBP) Hospital, offers three-year postgraduate degree programs leading to Doctor of Medicine (MD) and Master of Surgery (MS) qualifications. Affiliated with Tripura University and recognized by the National Medical Commission (NMC), the institution provides postgraduate training across 20 broad medical and surgical specialties. Following seat expansions approved by the NMC for the 2026–27 academic session, the college's annual postgraduate intake capacity stands at 153 seats. Admissions are conducted through the National Eligibility cum Entrance Test (Postgraduate) (NEET-PG) under both the All India Quota and the Tripura State Quota.

The college offers postgraduate degrees in the following 20 specialties:

- Doctor of Medicine (MD) (15 specialties): Anaesthesiology, Biochemistry, Community Medicine, Forensic Medicine & Toxicology, Anatomy, General Medicine, Microbiology, Pathology, Paediatrics, Pharmacology, Physiology, Psychiatry, Radiation Oncology, Radio-diagnosis, and Respiratory Medicine.
- Master of Surgery (MS) (5 specialties): General Surgery, Obstetrics & Gynaecology, Ophthalmology, Orthopaedics, and Otorhinolaryngology (ENT).
