= Kwatha (disambiguation) =

Kwatha may also refer to:

- Kwatha dialect, a variety of Meitei language spoken in the Kwatha village
- Kwatha Khunnou, a village near the Kwatha village
- Kwatha Festival, an annual tourism festival organised in the Kwatha village
- Kwatha Lai Haraoba, a unique form of traditional Lai Haraoba festival organised in the Kwatha village
- Kwatha Pham Kaaba, a documentation of the traditional ascension of the regional chief position by the elders of the Kwatha village
