= Kwatha Pham Kaaba =

2024 Meitei film

Kwatha Pham Kaaba (transl. The Great Kwatha Accession)
- ꯀ꯭ꯋꯥꯊꯥ ꯐꯝ ꯀꯥꯕ
- Directed by: Khaba Maimom
- Based on: Kwatha traditions
- Starring: Meitei people of Kwatha village
- Release date: 27 July 2024 (Imphal)
- Country: India
- Language: Meitei language (Manipuri)

Kwatha Pham Kaaba (Note: written in native Meitei Mayek script as ꯀ꯭ꯋꯥꯊꯥ ꯐꯝ ꯀꯥꯕ.) (transl. The Great Kwatha Accession), also spelled as Kwatha Pham Kaba, is a 2024 Meitei language documentary, directed by Khaba Maimom. The documentary is about Pham Kaaba, a traditional ceremony held in Kwatha village, Manipur in which one of the twelve village headmen is appointed.

== Release ==
Kwatha Pham Kaaba premiered on 27 July 2024, at the auditorium hall of the Manipur State Film Development Society (MSFDS) in Imphal.

== Nomination ==
In 2025, Kwatha Pham Kaba has been submitted for the Best Debutant Director award in the Non-Feature category, by its director Khaiba Maibam.

== See also ==
- Meitei festivals
- Kwatha Festival
- Kwatha Khunou (Kwatha Khunnou)
- Konthong Lairembi
- Burmese–Meitei relations
- Meitei people in Myanmar
- Lai Haraoba in Myanmar
