= Kwatha Lai Haraoba =

Meitei religious festival

Lai Haraoba in Kwatha
- Symbol of traditional Meitei religion (Sanamahism)
- Status: active
- Genre: Meitei festival
- Frequency: Annual
- Venue: Kwatha village
- Locations: Kwatha, Manipur
- Country: India
- Participants: Meitei people and Assam Rifles
- Attendance: more than 1000
- Capacity: more than 1000
- People: Meitei people
- Member: Meitei people

Lai Haraoba (ꯂꯥꯏ ꯍꯔꯥꯎꯕ) in Kwatha village is a traditional Meitei festival that celebrates the creation myths and ancestral Meitei deities of the Meitei community. The festival involves ritual dances, music, and ceremonies that honor traditional deities and reflect the Meitei intangible cultural heritage. It plays a significant role in preserving the customs and beliefs of the people in Kwatha village. Kwatha's Lai Haraoba belongs to the category of Chakpa Haraoba, which is specific to certain indigenous groups within the region.

== Background ==
Kwatha is a historic Meitei village located in the hills of Manipur, near Moreh, along the India–Myanmar border. It is the only ancient Meitei-inhabited village in the hill areas of Manipur.

== Worshiping deities ==
Lai Haraoba in Kwatha is specifically dedicated to Meitei deities, Nongpok Ningthou (ꯅꯣꯡꯄꯣꯛ ꯅꯤꯡꯊꯧ) and Panthoibi (ꯄꯥꯟꯊꯣꯏꯕꯤ).

== Celebration ==
In 2013, the Lai Haraoba festival was celebrated again in Kwatha village after a two-year break. The festival lasted for five days and concluded on 27 May 2013. This traditional event is one of the most important and widely recognized festivals among the Meitei community.

== Participation ==
In 2013, despite heavy rain and poor road access, more than a thousand devotees from across Manipur and other places participated in the celebrations.

In May 2021, the Tengnoupal Battalion of the Assam Rifles, under IGAR (South), helped the people of Kwatha village celebrate the Lai Haraoba festival. During the event, villagers and Assam Rifles soldiers prayed together at the village temple. Because of COVID-19, only a small number of people joined the celebration. Everyone followed COVID-19 safety rules, said the Assam Rifles. At the end, the Assam Rifles gave food and snacks to the villagers. The village chief thanked them for their help and asked them to keep supporting the village in the future.

In April 2025, the Assam Rifles took part in the Lai Haraoba festival in Kwatha village. According to the Public Relations Officer of IGAR (South), more than 100 local people, including children, joined the event with great excitement. The festival was full of traditional dances, prayers, and a strong sense of community and culture. Devotees also came from nearby places like Moreh and Imphal to take part in the celebration.

== Study tour programs ==
During the Lai Haraoba festival in Kwatha, a three-day study tour was held from May 25 to 27, 1995, for the final year students of the Dance Diploma course, by the Ministry of Human Resource Development. This annual tour allows students to experience and learn about the festival firsthand as part of their final year curriculum. The same was done in 2009.

== Organizers and supporters ==
In 2013, the festival was organized by the "Kwatha Nongpok Ningthou & Panthoibi Erat Thouram Committee" in collaboration with the Kwatha Village Authorities. They expressed their thanks to the 24 Assam Rifles of 26 Sector AR for their support and assistance in ensuring the smooth conduct of the festival.

In May 2022, Keirao MLA Lourembam Rameshwar and members of the group SPPM (Salaicha Pibarel Punsi Marup) went to Kwatha village. They prayed at the holy places of Nongpok Ningthou and Nongpok Panthoibi Chaningkhombi. The MLA also gave money to help the villagers with the Lai Haraoba festival, as it had become costly to hold.

== See also ==
- Kwatha Pham Kaaba
- Kwatha Khunou
- Lai Haraoba in Bangladesh
- Lai Haraoba in Myanmar
- Lai Haraoba in Tripura
- Meitei ritual songs
- Ancient Meitei hymns
