= Yumsharol Jagoi =

Traditional Meitei dance form

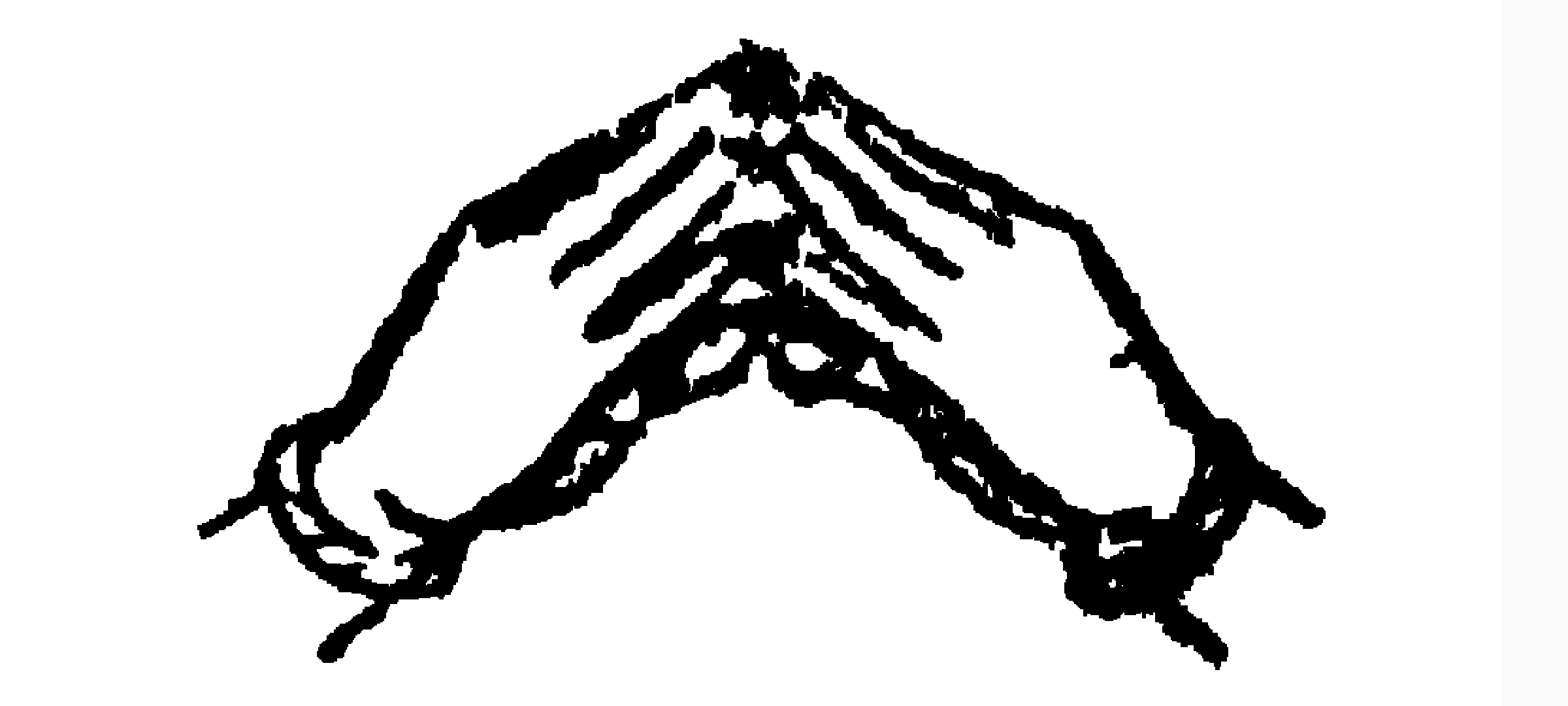
- A gesture (Khut-thek) of building a house in Lai Haraoba classical dance & music ritualistic performances
- Native name: ꯌꯨꯝꯁꯥꯔꯣꯜ ꯖꯒꯣꯏ
- Etymology: Yumsharol & Jagoi
- Genre: Yumsharol & Jagoi
- Instrument: Pena (musical instrument)
- Inventor: Meitei people
- Origin: Meitei civilisation, Ancient Kangleipak (early Manipur)
- Related dances: Khamba Thoibi Jagoi & other dance forms of Lai Haraoba

Yumsharol Jagoi (ꯌꯨꯝꯁꯥꯔꯣꯜ ꯖꯒꯣꯏ), (Note: derived from Ancient Meitei term "Yumshalol Chatkoi (ꯌꯨꯝꯁꯥꯂꯣꯜ ꯆꯠꯀꯣꯏ)") also known as Yumsharon Jagoi (ꯌꯨꯝꯁꯥꯔꯣꯟ ꯖꯒꯣꯏ), (Note: derived from Ancient Meitei term "Yumshalon Chatkoi (ꯌꯨꯝꯁꯥꯂꯣꯟ ꯆꯠꯀꯣꯏ)") is a traditional dance form of the Meitei people from Manipur, India. This dance shows the process of building a house using special hand movements known as Yumsharol Khutthek (ꯌꯨꯝꯁꯥꯔꯣꯜ ꯈꯨꯠꯊꯦꯛ), which means "hand gestures of house construction." These gestures are used to represent different steps in making a house. It is a Meitei intangible cultural heritage.

The dance is usually performed along with the Yumsharol song (ꯌꯨꯝꯁꯥꯔꯣꯜ ꯏꯁꯩ) and the music of a traditional instrument called the pena (musical instrument). Yumsharol Jagoi is an important part of Lai Haraoba (ꯂꯥꯏ ꯍꯔꯥꯎꯕ), a festival that celebrates the Meitei gods and the creation of the world according to Meitei religion and culture. The performance is both spiritual and artistic, showing respect for traditional ways of life and honoring the skills of house building as part of community life in Meitei civilization.

== Hand gestures ==
Illustration	Names of the Khut-thek gestures	Romanization	Usage(s)/Application(s)	Note(s)
	ꯆꯤꯂꯦꯜ ꯂꯥꯡꯌꯦꯡ (ꯆꯤꯔꯦꯜ ꯂꯥꯡꯌꯦꯡ) ꯈꯨꯠꯊꯦꯛ	Chilel Laang-yeng (Chirel Lang-yeng)	a gesture (Khut-thek) of installing holy horns (antlers)	
	ꯆꯨꯛ ꯌꯨꯡꯄ (ꯆꯨꯛ ꯌꯨꯡꯕ) ꯈꯨꯠꯊꯦꯛ	Chook Yungpa (Chuk Yungba)	a gesture (Khut-thek) of erecting a pole	
	ꯏ ꯀꯨꯞꯄ ꯈꯨꯠꯊꯦꯛ	Ee Kuppa	a gesture (Khut-thek) of roofing a house	
	ꯍꯨꯝꯇꯥꯡ ꯌꯥꯟꯄ (ꯍꯨꯝꯗꯥꯡ ꯌꯥꯟꯕ) ꯈꯨꯠꯊꯦꯛ	Humtaang Yaanpa (Humdaang Yaanba)	a gesture (Khut-thek) of building a house	
	ꯈꯥꯡꯉꯥ ꯊꯥꯡꯀꯠꯄ (ꯈꯥꯡꯉꯥ ꯊꯥꯡꯒꯠꯄ) ꯈꯨꯠꯊꯦꯛ	Khaang-ngaa Thaang-katpa (Khang-nga Thaang-gatpa)	a gesture (Khut-thek) of building a house	
	ꯈꯥꯡꯉꯦꯜ ꯍꯥꯞꯄ ꯈꯨꯠꯊꯦꯛ	Khaangel Haappa	a gesture (Khut-thek) of installing roof supporting pole	
	ꯂꯩꯍꯨꯟ ꯖꯒꯣꯏ ꯈꯨꯠꯊꯦꯛ	Leihun Jagoi Khutthek	a gesture (Khut-thek) of building a house	
	ꯂꯩꯃꯥꯏ ꯇꯩꯄ (ꯂꯩꯃꯥꯏ ꯇꯩꯕ) ꯈꯨꯠꯊꯦꯛ	Leimaai Teipa (Leimai Teiba)	a gesture (Khut-thek) of flooring	
	ꯂꯩꯇꯦꯝ ꯀꯥꯌꯥꯠ ꯈꯨꯠꯊꯦꯛ	Leitem Kaayaat	a gesture (Khut-thek) of surfacing each room	
	ꯄꯂꯤꯡ ꯍꯨꯟꯄ (ꯄꯔꯤꯡ ꯍꯨꯟꯕ) ꯈꯨꯠꯊꯦꯛ	Paling Hunpa (Paring Hunba)	a gesture (Khut-thek) of building a house	
	ꯄꯂꯤꯡ ꯀꯣꯟꯄ (ꯄꯔꯤꯡ ꯀꯣꯟꯕ) ꯈꯨꯠꯊꯦꯛ	Paling Konpa (Paring Konba)	a gesture (Khut-thek) of building a house	
	ꯄꯂꯤꯡ ꯂꯥꯡꯁꯥꯡ ꯍꯨꯟꯄ (ꯄꯔꯤꯡ ꯂꯥꯡꯁꯥꯡ ꯍꯨꯟꯕ) ꯈꯨꯠꯊꯦꯛ	Paling Laangsang Hunpa (Paring Langsang Hunba)	a gesture (Khut-thek) of building a house	
	ꯐꯛꯂꯥꯡ ꯈꯥꯄ (ꯐꯛꯂꯥꯡ ꯈꯥꯕ) ꯈꯨꯠꯊꯦꯛ	Phaklaang Khaapa (Phaklang Khaaba)	a gesture (Khut-thek) of installing walls	
	ꯐꯛꯂꯥꯡ ꯋꯥꯏ ꯇꯩꯄ (ꯐꯛꯂꯥꯡ ꯋꯥꯏ ꯇꯩꯕ) ꯈꯨꯠꯊꯦꯛ	Phaklaang Waai Teipa (Phaklang Wai Teiba)	a gesture (Khut-thek) of plastering a wall	
	ꯁꯥꯏ ꯀꯛꯄ ꯈꯨꯠꯊꯦꯛ	Saai Kakpa	a gesture (Khut-thek) of lady changing hairstyle (denoting marriage)	
	ꯎꯈꯨꯜ ꯇꯥꯟꯄ (ꯎꯈꯨꯜ ꯇꯥꯟꯕ) ꯈꯨꯠꯊꯦꯛ	Ukhul Taanpa (Ukhul Taanba)	a gesture (Khut-thek) of digging a pillar hole	
	ꯎꯂꯥ ꯊꯥꯄ (ꯎꯔꯥ ꯊꯥꯕ) ꯈꯨꯠꯊꯦꯛ	Ulaa Thaapa (Uraa Thaaba)	a gesture (Khut-thek) of building a house	
	ꯌꯨꯝꯄꯤꯂꯦꯜ ꯍꯥꯞꯄ (ꯌꯨꯝꯕꯤꯔꯦꯜ ꯍꯥꯞꯄ) ꯈꯨꯠꯊꯦꯛ	Yumpilel Haappa (Yumbirel Happa)	a gesture (Khut-thek) of installing main pillar	

== See also ==
- Lai Haraoba in Bangladesh
- Lai Haraoba in Myanmar
- Lai Haraoba in Tripura
- Kwatha Lai Haraoba
- Khamba Thoibi Jagoi
- Traditional Meitei theatre
- Modern Meitei theatre
- Meitei traditional games
- Meitei traditional toys
- Meitei traditional weapons
- Meitei martial arts
- Thang Ta
- Sarit Sarak
- Cheibi
