= Yumsharol =

Classical Meitei architectural tradition

Yumsharol (ꯌꯨꯝꯁꯥꯔꯣꯜ), (Note: shortened from the Meitei Yumsharol (ꯃꯩꯇꯩ ꯌꯨꯝꯁꯥꯔꯣꯜ)) also known as Yumsharon (ꯌꯨꯝꯁꯥꯔꯣꯟ), (Note: shortened from the Meitei Yumsharon (ꯃꯩꯇꯩ ꯌꯨꯝꯁꯥꯔꯣꯟ)) is a classical architectural tradition of house-building in traditional Meitei society, reflecting both Meitei intangible cultural heritage and ancestral craftsmanship. It encompasses the holy and sacred ceremonies, rites, and rituals related to the construction and maintenance of the main house, as well as associated structures such as shrines or temples dedicated to deities, granaries for food storage, and barns, stables, and sties for domestic animals. These practices are carried out in accordance with the traditional Meitei religion of Sanamahism.

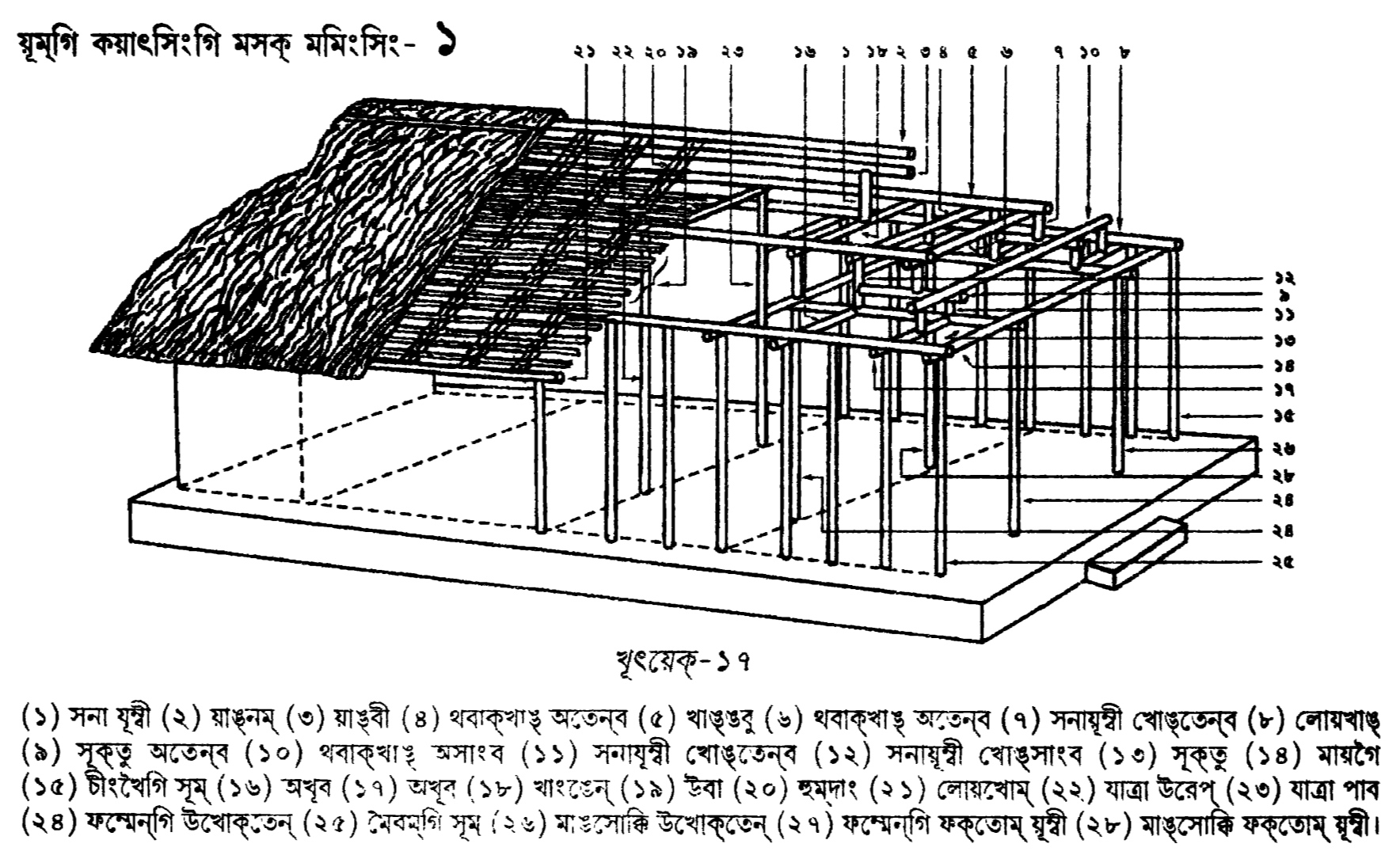
Details of building a traditional Meitei house according to the art of Meitei Yumsharol

Many concepts and problems of geometry are found in the treatise of Yumsharol.

Besides being a form of visual arts, "Yumsharol" (also known as Yumsharol Jagoi in case of its performing arts) also refers to a traditional Meitei dance form, which depicts the processes of house construction, through different gestures called Yumsharol Khutthek (meaning hand gestures of house construction), notably accompanied with the Yumsharol song, and the playing of pena (musical instrument), traditionally enacted during Lai Haraoba performances.

== Land plot ==
Before beginning any construction or settlement, the ancient Meitei people assessed whether the proposed land was associated with Tillam or Lailam (Lairam). They examined the land’s characteristics and type, followed by specific ceremonies and rituals to determine whether it was auspicious or inauspicious. The discovery of animal bones or skeletal remains was seen as a negative omen and required removal. The land’s shape and orientation were also interpreted as indicators of potential fortune or misfortune for its owner.

== Yumpham ==
The ancient Meitei people classified Yumpham—the position of a house or settlement—into nine distinct types, each with its own advantages and disadvantages. The appropriate type was often determined based on the owner's date of birth. Additionally, certain types were known as Lengdraba Yumpham, referring to fixed or stationary housing positions considered unchanging in nature.

== Types of Yumsharol ==
Within a specific Ingkhol (or Eengkhol), meaning a land plot, there are nine types of Yumsharol. The classification of Yumpham—the housing or settlement position—is determined based on these Yumsharol types.

== Foundation of building ==
The ancient Meitei people observed strict rules regarding the timing of house construction. According to the twelve-month Meitei calendar, certain months were considered auspicious and favorable for building, while construction during the remaining months was regarded as inauspicious and discouraged.

In house construction, the ancient Meitei people considered the Pham—a specific positional alignment—guided by Laiyum. They also followed the principles of Taoroinai Yumsharol, a subset of Meitei Yumsharol, based on the Paphal (symbolic diagram) of Taoroinai. Auspicious and inauspicious periods for laying the foundation varied from person to person, determined by their date of birth, along with astrological and astronomical factors. The phases of the moon (thaa) and the nature of stars (thawaanmichaak) were also assessed to determine whether they were in harmony with the individual landowner.

== Seeing auspiciousness and omens through calendar ==
Aligned with the Meitei calendar, the ancient Meitei people gave careful attention to various elements when determining the timing of construction. These included the positions of Leisaa (or Leishaa), the conditions of Leikhun Changba, Naamungba, and other related factors. When crafting specific parts of a house, such as the eaves (sai in Meitei), they identified auspicious moments based on the alignment of stars (thawaanmichaak) using their traditional calendar. They also considered the symbolic relationship between the three realms—Leikhaa (netherworld), Nongthou (heaven), and Leipaak (earth)—to determine whether these realms spiritually or symbolically touched the home. Astrological conditions, such as the alignment or opposition of the sun and stars, were taken seriously not only in house construction but also in building barns, stables, and animal shelters. Their practices were guided by the 12 lunar phases and 27 star groups, with distinct auspicious and inauspicious timings observed for the construction of shrines and granaries as well.

== Series ==
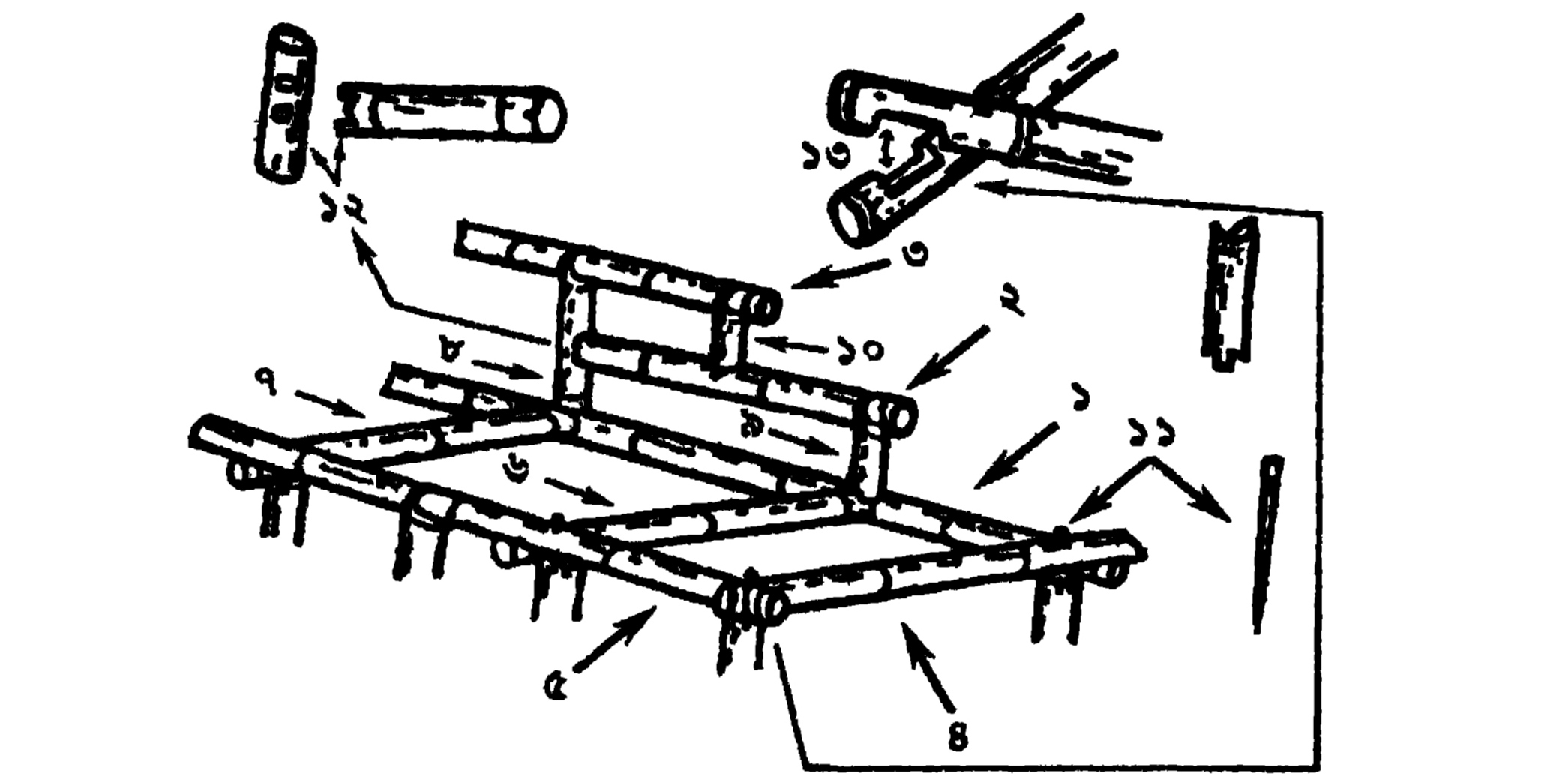
Interlocking of wooden or bamboo poles for framework

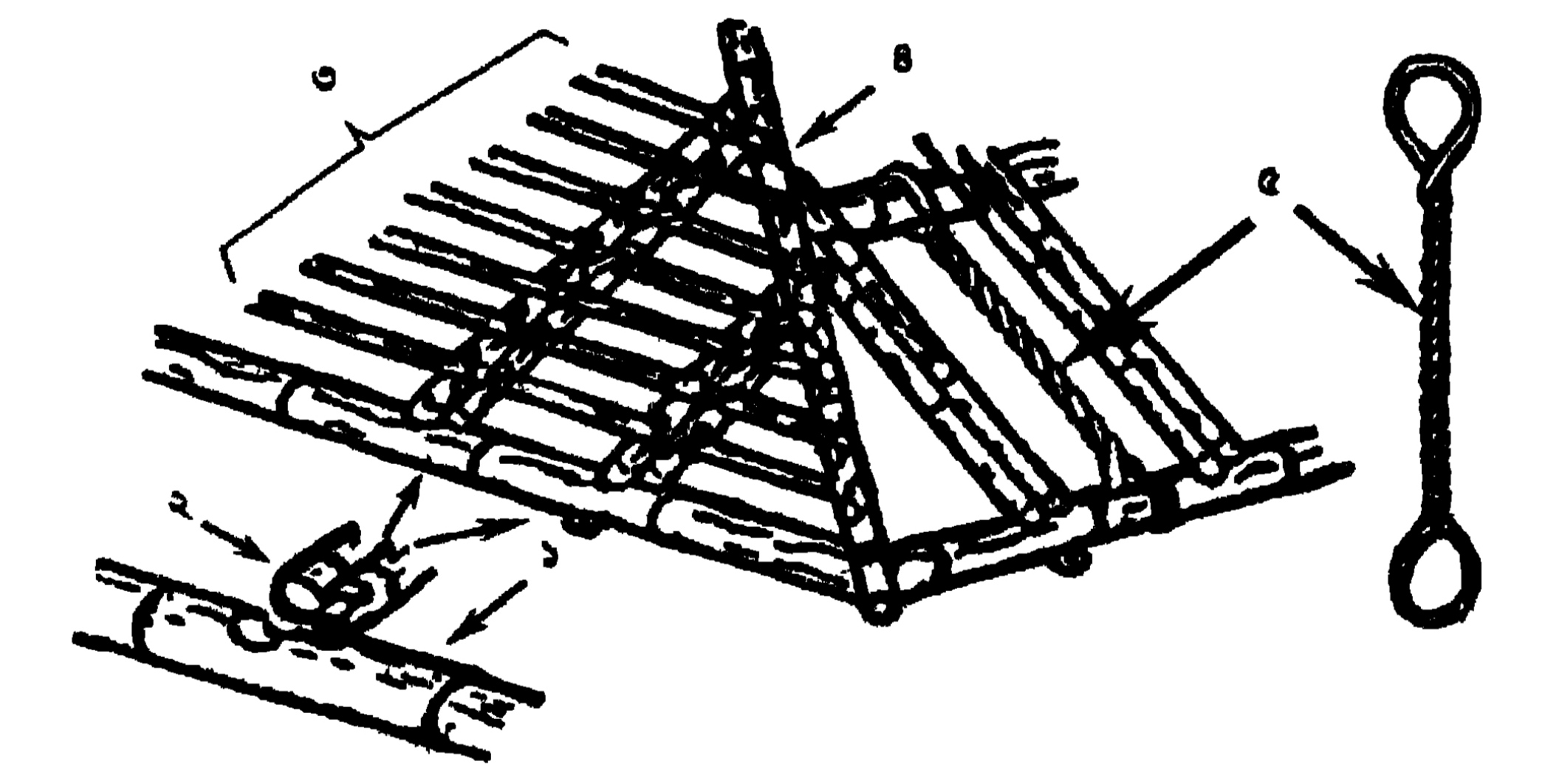
Interlocking of wooden or bamboo poles for framework

Special ceremonies such as Paring Laangsang Hunba and Chuksatlon (also known as Chukshatlon) are conducted as part of the construction process. During these events, the layout and design for pillar erection are carefully planned, with holes dug at specific intervals where the pillars are to be installed. Distinct and elaborate rituals are performed for this stage, accompanied by sacred chantings to ensure spiritual harmony and auspiciousness.

== Room layout ==
The interior of a traditional Meitei house is divided into four main sections, each reflecting specific cultural and spiritual principles. Important concepts such as Lamjei Mapaan Thokpa, Kaaran Mapaan Thokpa, Ingkhol Kaaran (or Eengkhol Kaaran), Yoimongba Kaaran, Lai Kaaran, Taoroinai Kaaran, Nongmadon Kaaran, Usoi Kaaran (also Ushoi Kaaran), Yumlaithok, and Khudup-ki Waayel are carefully considered. In this context, Kaaran refers to the junction point where two or more diagonals of wooden or bamboo frameworks intersect, playing a key role in both structural integrity and symbolic meaning.

== Setting up ==
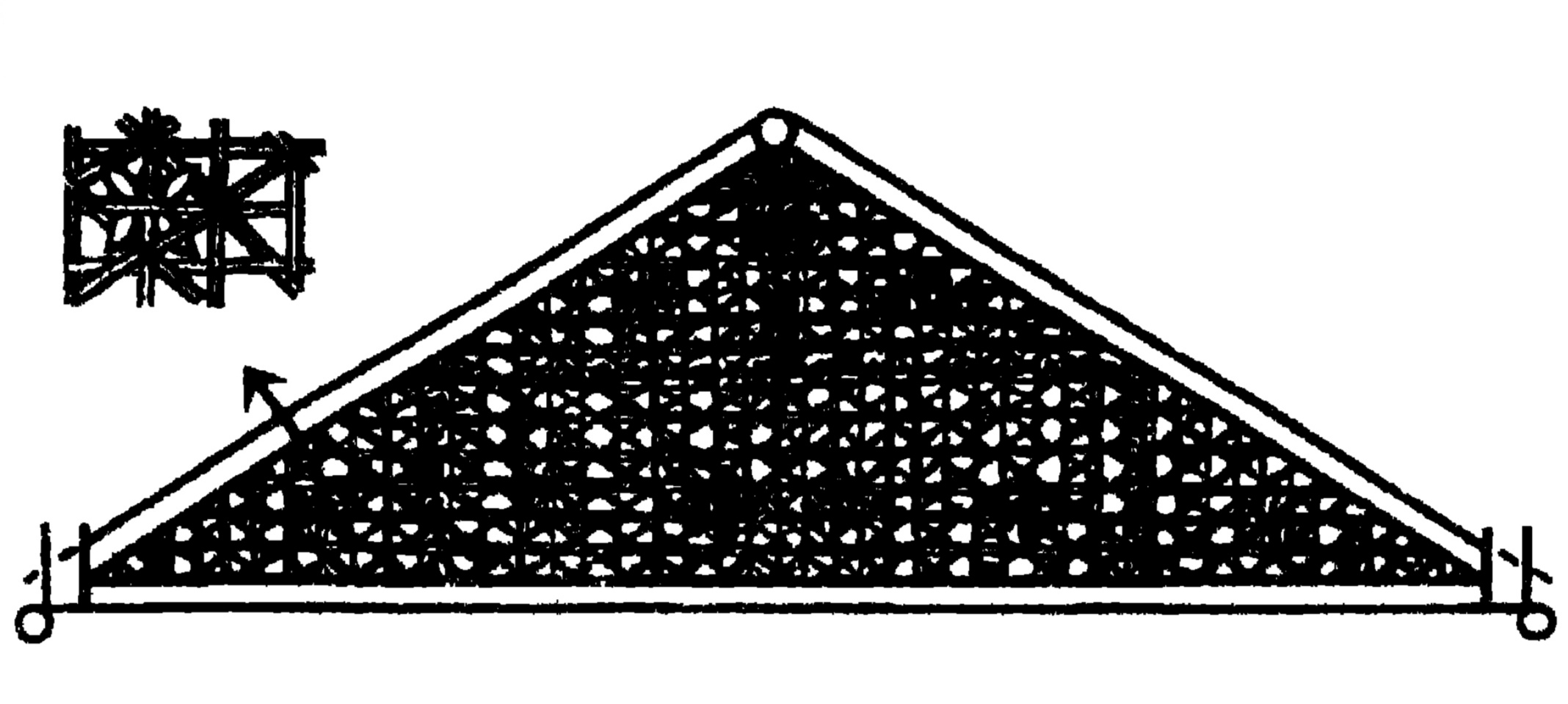
A rooftop portion of a traditional Meitei house

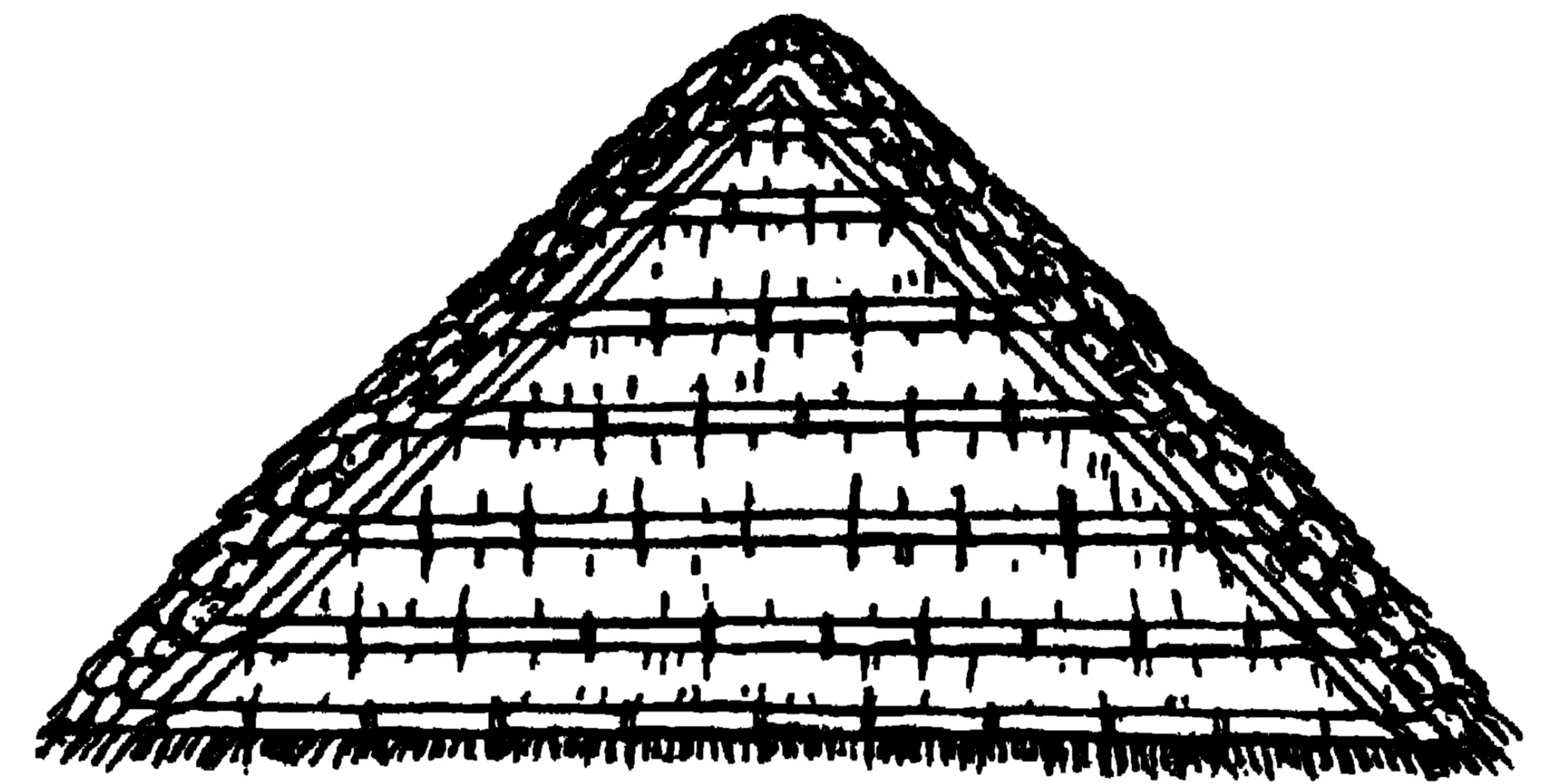
A rooftop portion of a traditional Meitei house

The construction of a traditional Meitei house relies heavily on the placement of wooden pillars, which must be firmly positioned and thoroughly inspected before the main framework is established. Each pillar is ceremonially given a unique name, reflecting its significance. Various types of pillars are used, including Yumbi (or Yumpi) and Loi-u, among others. Important ceremonies such as Humdaang Yaanba and Yum Houba Usin (or Ushin), typically conducted over seven days, are performed during this phase. The timing of the Yum Houba ceremony is carefully aligned with auspicious star positions. Additionally, the ritual of Asithong Thingba—meaning "closing the door of death"—is carried out to ensure the well-being and longevity of future inhabitants. The installation of the house's rooftop also takes place only after identifying favorable astrological conditions, as both auspicious and inauspicious star alignments are taken very seriously.

== Inauguration ==
The inauguration of a newly built house follows strict timing based on the Meitei calendar, with specific months regarded as either auspicious or inauspicious. The selection of an appropriate time is closely guided by the positions of the stars. During the inauguration, a number of prescribed rituals and prohibitions are observed, ensuring that the process aligns with traditional beliefs and spiritual principles.

== Rules ==
After the inauguration, for the following seven days and seven weeks—excluding specific days—the household belongings are to be kept within the family and not lent to outsiders, as doing so is believed to bring misfortune and lead to a loss of wealth and good luck. Adding paddy to the granary is permitted only on designated auspicious days within certain months, according to the calendar. There are also particular days when no items should be brought into the house from outside. The granary door is to remain closed except during these select auspicious times. Observance of the full moon and new moon phases is strictly maintained. Numerous rules and regulations govern the care and upkeep of all aspects of the house and household, reflecting the deep cultural significance attributed to these practices.

== Pavilion ==
While the construction of a pavilion is common, it is not mandatory. There are extensive rules and regulations governing its layout and design.

== Chantings ==
Holy and sacred chantings (Laison or Laishon) are an integral part of the house’s spiritual life. These include various types such as Laison Ahaanba, Iru Laison (or Eeru Laishon), Athou Laison, Yumdai Naakseng Laison, Atai Laison, Mei Iraat Laison, Yum Sang-gaaba Laison, Sanamahi Tengtha Laison, Lammitlon, Pungkhanpalon, Maikei 10 Laiming, Heisoi Ipaan Thaapa Laison, Yumjao Leima Iraat Laison, Konyailon Laison (also Konyairon Laishon), Pongning Laison, Apoklon Laison, Umanglon, among many others.

== See also ==
- Meitei monuments in Bangladesh
- Lai Haraoba in Bangladesh
- Lai Haraoba in Myanmar
- Lai Haraoba in Tripura
- Meitei astronomy
