= Manipuri Tamils =

Ethnic group

Total population
- 17,000 (2011)

Regions with significant populations
- Moreh, India

Languages
- Tamil (L1), Meitei (Manipuri) (L2)

Religion
- Majority: Hinduism; Minority: Islam, Christianity

Related ethnic groups
- Meitei people, Burmese people, Kuki people

The northeastern Indian state of Manipur has a relatively large population of Tamils, largely concentrated near the border of Myanmar. The town of Moreh in particular, has an estimated 17,000 Tamils. Tamils in Manipur have relatives and business contacts in Myanmar, which is a valuable network, facilitating cross-border trade.

== History ==
Tamils from Burma came back to India when General Ne Win nationalized banks, shops, and factories. Some of them found life in refugee camps in Tamil Nadu challenging, so they decided to return to Burma through land. They were stopped by Burmese immigration at the border town of Moreh and settled there as a result.

Around 1992, there were clashes between the Tamil and Kuki communities due to attempts by Kuki militants to impose heavy taxes on Tamil businesses.The issue was amicably resolved after the Tamil community struck a deal to invest in the local business, health and education that would benefit the Kuki community as well.

Recently, the Tamil community has been involved in a legal battle to prevent the Manipur government from giving up land occupied by Sri Angala Parameshwari Sri Muneeswarar temple to Myanmar. One of the gates of this temple is in Burmese territory.

== Religion ==
Other than the Sri Angala Parameshwari Sri Muneeswarar temple mentioned, the Tamil Hindu temples in Moreh are Sree Veeramma Kali Temple, Sree Badrakaali Temple, and the Sree Periyapalayathamman temple. There is also a Tamil mosque, known as the Tamir-E-Millath Jamia Masjid, and a Tamil Catholic church, the St. George Church, in Moreh.

The Kanchi Kamakoti Peetham has been involved in spiritual activities in Manipur.

== Entertainment ==
Over the past several years, Tamil films have garnered popularity slowly in Manipur, partly due to a ban on Hindi language entertainment by militant groups such as the Revolutionary People's Front (RPF). There is a reference to the Tamil community in Manipur in The Family Man (Indian TV series) Season 3 episode 6.

== Impact of 2023 Manipur Violence ==
After the Kukis were attacked in Imphal, Kuki mobs targeted Meitei homes and properties in Moreh resulting in the collateral damage of more than 45 houses and shops of Tamils being burned as they were close to Meitei homes during the 2023 ethnic clash between the Meiteis and the Kukis.
