= Kwatha Festival =

Annual event in Manipur

Kwatha Festival ꯀ꯭ꯋꯥꯊꯥ ꯀꯨꯝꯃꯩ / ꯀ꯭ꯋꯥꯊꯥ ꯀꯨꯝꯍꯩ
- Nickname: Kwatha Fest; Kwatha Kummei / Kwatha Kumhei
- Status: active
- Genre: fairs, festivals, conferences, exhibitions, etc.
- Frequency: Annually
- Venue: Kwatha village
- Location: Kwatha
- Country: India
- Years active: 10
- Inaugurated: October 22, 2016
- Attendance: more than 1000
- Capacity: more than 1000
- Major events: traditional dance forms, other song and dance shows, displaying local products, spot photography competition, sightseeing, trekking, evening musical performances, among others
- People: Meitei people

Kwatha Festival (ꯀ꯭ꯋꯥꯊꯥ ꯀꯨꯝꯃꯩ / ꯀ꯭ꯋꯥꯊꯥ ꯀꯨꯝꯍꯩ; Kwatha Kummei / Kwatha Kumhei) is an annual event held at Kwatha village, located in Tengnoupal district, Manipur, northeast India, with the objective of promoting Meitei culture and encouraging community development. It promotes the cultural heritage of Kwatha village, which is one of the oldest surviving Meitei settlements, located in the hill areas of Manipur.

== Annual editions ==
- The 1st edition of the two-day Kwatha Festival, began on October 22, 2016, concluded on October 23, 2016.
- The 2nd edition of the three-day Kwatha Festival was held from October 27 to 29, 2017. The event aimed to promote the village's primary livelihood product, Soibum (ꯁꯣꯏꯕꯨꯝ), a fermented bamboo shoots that are widely used in Meitei cuisine.
- The 3rd edition of the two-day Kwatha Festival, with the theme "Natural Beauty," was held on November 3 and 4, 2018.
- The 5th edition of the two-day Kwatha Festival was held from November 11 to 12, 2022.

=== Organising teams ===
The event was organized by different associations and organizations in different years.

- In 2016, it was organized by the Schedule Caste Welfare Club, Kwatha, with support from the Assam Rifles.
- In 2017, it was organized by Roof for Freedom (RFF), the Kwatha Soibum Festival Organizing Committee, and the Kwatha People Welfare Organization.
- In 2018, it was jointly organized by Roots for Freedom and the Kwatha Youth Club.
- In 2022, it was organised by the Kwatha Youth Club.

=== Inauguration and attendance ===
==== 2017 ====
Notable attendees of the 2017 festival included:

- Sarangthem Ibomcha, Superintendent of Police, Tengnoupal
- Ningthoujam Kamal, Chief of Kwatha Village
- Semseitong, Chief Headman of Ganaphai village
- Haokip Letkhuthang, Chief Headman of Chalawa village
- RK Sanayaima, President of ACODOM group
- Tekcham Premabati Leima, President of Nupi Khunai Chaokhat Lamching Lup, Moreh Ward No. 7 area
- Pacho Kom, Village Head of Khudengthabi and chief guest of the event
- Thoiba, President of the Meitei Council Moreh
- Waikhom Munindro Kumar, advisor to Roof for Freedom

==== 2022 ====
The 2022 festival was formally inaugurated by Letpao Haokip, Minister of Tribal Affairs and Hills, Government of Manipur. The inaugural function was attended by several government officials and local leaders. Notable attendees included:

- L. Sushindro Meitei, Minister of Consumer Affairs, Food and Public Distribution
- Angom Amu Meitei, Chairman of Kwatha village
- Yumnam Ranjan, Deputy Commissioner of Tengnoupal
- Major Sasikumar, 20 Assam Rifles

== Activities ==
During the 2016 Kwatha Festival, traditional dance forms of Kwatha village were performed along with other song and dance shows. Several stalls were set up displaying local products such as Soibum (ꯁꯣꯏꯕꯨꯝ, fermented bamboo shoot), Haribob (ꯍꯔꯤꯕꯣꯕ), and Wai-yuu (ꯋꯥꯏꯌꯨ, a local brew). A spot photography competition was also held with three categories: (1) plants and trees (flora), (2) animals (fauna), and (3) everyday life in Kwatha village (lifestyle).

During the first edition of the Kwatha Festival (2016), Laishram Ranbir, a reporter from Imphal Times, received the 3rd prize in the Fauna category of the spot photography contest.

During the second edition of the Kwatha Festival (2017), he secured the 1st prize in the Lifestyle category and the 2nd prize in the Fauna category. He was honoured with mementos and cash prizes for his achievements.

In 2017 edition, activities during the festival included sightseeing, trekking, and evening musical performances.

== Infrastructure development ==
In 2017 edition, Waikhom Munindro Kumar, advisor to Roof for Freedom, stated that the festival’s primary goal was to provide visibility to the villagers’ main livelihood. To accommodate visitors, around 150 tents with a capacity of four persons each were set up. Additional lodging arrangements were made in nearby hotels.

During the 2022 opening ceremony, Minister L. Sushindro Meitei announced that a community hall would be constructed within three days. The hall is intended to accommodate people attending the upcoming Lai Haraoba (ꯂꯥꯏ ꯍꯔꯥꯎꯕ) celebration, a traditional Meitei festival.

=== Road improvement appeal ===
In 2022, a Manipur government minister requested the cooperation of residents living along the road to Kwatha village. He urged them to support efforts to upgrade the existing road into a double-lane route to improve connectivity and access.

== Employment opportunities for youth ==
In 2022, a Manipur government minister announced plans to provide employment to the youth of Kwatha village based on their qualifications. He stated that the initiative would be carried out in collaboration with the concerned departments. Youth were encouraged to submit their academic and professional documents to avail of this opportunity.

== Social welfare initiatives ==
As part of his 2022 visit, a Manipur government minister met with Takhellambam Ongbi Tampak Leima (ꯇꯈꯦꯜꯂꯝꯕꯝ ꯑꯣꯡꯕꯤ ꯇꯝꯄꯥꯛ ꯂꯩꯃ), a 101-year-old resident of the village, and extended financial assistance. He also directed the Deputy Commissioner of Tengnoupal to ensure that all residents of the village aged 60 and above are provided with old age pensions.

== Support for economically disadvantaged families ==
In 2022, Deputy Commissioner Yumnam Ranjan announced that five economically disadvantaged families in Kwatha village would be adopted under various government welfare schemes. He stated that these families would soon begin receiving the benefits of the available social support programs.

== Purpose ==
The Kwatha Festival is an annual cultural event aimed at preserving traditional practices, fostering community engagement, and promoting rural development. The 2017 edition drew attention to the challenges faced by the village and to educate both residents and visitors on sustainable living through the use of local natural resources. The 2022 edition highlighted the collaboration between government officials and local communities to support infrastructure, social welfare, and employment initiatives.

== See also ==
- Meitei festivals
  - Lai Haraoba in Myanmar
- Kwatha Khunou (Kwatha Khunnou)
- Meitei people in Myanmar
- Sangai Festival
