= Konthong Lairembi =

Meitei goddess

- Goddess of doorways, entrances and gateways
- Member of Meitei goddesses
- Other names: Kondong Lairembi, Kondong Lairemma, Kondong Leima, Konthong Lairemma, Konthong Leima
- Affiliation: Meitei mythology and Meitei religion (Sanamahism)
- Major cult center: Moreh
- Abode: gateways, entrances, doorways
- Adherents: Meitei people and Manipur Tamil community
- Texts: Puyas
- Gender: female
- Region: Kangleipak (Meitei for 'Manipur')
- Ethnic group: Meitei people
- Festivals: Lai Haraoba

Konthong Lairembi, (Note: written in native Meitei script as "ꯀꯣꯟꯊꯣꯡ ꯂꯥꯏꯔꯦꯝꯕꯤ".) also known as Kondong Lairembi (Note: written in native Meitei script as "ꯀꯣꯟꯗꯣꯡ ꯂꯥꯏꯔꯦꯝꯕꯤ".) or Kondong Lairemma (Note: written in native Meitei script as "ꯀꯣꯟꯗꯣꯡ ꯂꯥꯏꯔꯦꯝꯃ".) or Konthong Lairemma, (Note: written in native Meitei script as "ꯀꯣꯟꯊꯣꯡ ꯂꯥꯏꯔꯦꯝꯃꯥ".) is a goddess in Meitei mythology and Meitei religion (Sanamahism) of Kangleipak (Meitei for 'Manipur'). One of her prominent cult centers is located in Moreh town, where the sacred Lai Haraoba festival is celebrated in her honour. Notably, she is worshipped by Meitei people as well as Manipuri Tamil people.

== Etymology ==
In Meitei language, "Konthong" means "gate", or "enclosure-door". "Lairembi" and "Lairemma" are the Meitei terms for "goddess". "Leima" means "queen" in Meitei.

== Communal harmony ==
In January 2018, the Pongal festival was observed in Moreh, a town on the India-Myanmar border, reflecting communal harmony between the Meiteis and Manipuri Tamils, as well as between followers of Sanamahism (traditional Meitei religion) and Hinduism. According to Tamil Sangam Moreh, an organization representing Tamil traders in the area, the three-day festival included a communal feast held at the Kondong Lairembi temple, a Meitei religious site located near Moreh.

== Temple destruction & renovation ==
The Ima Kondong Lairembi shrine, a site of religious significance to the Meitei community, was vandalized in May 2023, amid ethnic conflict. The shrine in Moreh was reportedly destroyed by fire on May 3 and May 8, 2023, in the presence of central security forces. The incident occurred during a period of heightened ethnic conflict in the region.

In January 2024, restoration work of the temple in Moreh was commenced under the supervision of Deputy Inspector General (Range-II) Jogeshchandra Haobijam. The renovation was being carried out by personnel from the Manipur Police, Special Commandos, Indian Reserve Battalion (IRB), and Manipur Rifles (MR). The supervising officer was also responsible for overseeing border security operations and monitoring the movement of undocumented migrants from Myanmar into the region.

== Annual rituals ==
In May 2025, the Kondong Lairembi Thougal-Lup (IKLT), Moreh hosted the Ima Kondong Lairembi Enat Thouni (Kum Chanba) event at the Kodompokpi Relief Camp in Wangjing, Manipur.

In May 2024, the Ima Kondong Lairembi Thougal Lup, Moreh, announced that the annual Ima Kondong Lairembi Haraoba rituals would not be conducted due to the reported destruction of the temple by Kuki armed groups during the ongoing conflict. However, the Kum Chanba ritual associated with Ima Kondong Lairembi was scheduled to take place on May 10 at the Manipur Dance College, Palace Compound in Imphal. They invited individuals from Moreh and other parts of Manipur who have traditionally participated in the Lai Haraoba to attend the ceremony.

In April 2023, the Ima Kondong Lairembi Thougal Lup, Moreh, announced that the traditional Lai Haraoba ritual of Ima Kondong Lairembi would commence on April 23 and conclude on May 2. The Mukna Yendamnaba event, a component of the festival, was scheduled for April 29. The Lai Haraoba festival, one of the largest religious festivals of the Meiteis, was celebrated. Women arranged flowers and fruits to offer to Ima Kondong Lairembi. Meanwhile, men prepared for "Mukna Yendamba," a traditional wrestling competition held on the last day of the festival.

== See also ==
- Meitei people in Myanmar
  - Lai Haraoba in Myanmar
  - Meitei clothing in Myanmar
- Burmese–Meitei relations
- Meitei–Shan relations
