= Kwatha Khunou =

Meitei settlement in the hills of Manipur, India

Kwatha Khunou (ꯀ꯭ꯋꯥꯊꯥ ꯈꯨꯅꯧ; literally, extended new village of Kwatha), originally spelled as Kwatha Khunnou (ꯀ꯭ꯋꯥꯊꯥ ꯈꯨꯟꯅꯧ), is a small village located in Tengnoupal district, Manipur, near the India–Myanmar border. It lies about 16 kilometres from Moreh, a major border trade town. The village is mainly inhabited by the Meitei people. It is in a remote area, and the daily life of its residents depends heavily on access to nearby places in Myanmar.

In March 2024, Kwatha Khunou was reportedly set on fire by Kuki militants during 2023–2025 Manipur violence. It was an important place because it was among a few Meitei settlements in the hills, besides Kwatha, that had managed to stay unharmed for the past 10 months of unrest until its destruction.

== Emigration to other places ==
On March 12, 2024, residents of Kwatha Khunou publicly declared that they would not return to their homes unless a permanent security post is established in the village. The statement was made during a press briefing held at the Manipur Press Club in Imphal.

Kwatha Khunou is situated approximately 7 kilometres from Kwatha Khunjao and is inhabited by around 42 individuals from 13 households. According to village chairman Ningthoujam Manihar, the village has experienced repeated security challenges due to its proximity to Myanmar. Since the outbreak of conflict in Myanmar in March 2020, women and children from Kwatha Khunou have frequently taken temporary refuge in Kwatha Khunjao and other nearby areas.

Following the eruption of ethnic violence in Manipur on May 3, 2023, most villagers permanently relocated to safer locations. Manihar stated that both Myanmar’s military forces and non-state armed groups have intermittently entered the village, and that the Assam Rifles—India’s paramilitary force deployed in the region—have not been able to provide adequate protection. The absence of a permanent security post remains a key concern for the displaced residents.

Laishram Sanjoy, the village secretary, reported that on the night of March 10, 2024, the house of the village chief and one other residence were set on fire by unidentified individuals. Prior to this incident, household items and personal belongings had been looted. Sanjoy criticised Chief Minister N. Biren Singh for referring to the arson as an incident involving abandoned houses. Sanjoy also stated that villagers had received information that three individuals were responsible for the arson. Although no confrontation occurred, the alleged perpetrators reportedly fled upon encountering residents from the neighbouring village of Molphei.

The residents of Kwatha Khunou continue to demand the establishment of a permanent security installation in order to ensure their safe return. The village, while small, is situated in a geopolitically sensitive location and has expressed concerns about the lack of consistent state protection amid regional instability.

== Dependence on Kondong and Namphalong ==
The closest settlement to Kwatha Khunou is Kondong, a village in Myanmar, just a five-minute motorbike ride away. Villagers rely on Kondong for daily needs. For larger markets, they travel further to Namphalong, a busy border marketplace in Myanmar, which is about 15 minutes from Kondong. To reach Moreh or even the state capital, Imphal, villagers often go through Kondong and Namphalong and then cross into India again to catch public transport.

== Cross-border ties and shared resources ==
Kwatha Khunou and Kondong maintain friendly relations. Many families across the border are related through marriage. Despite the closeness, both villages respect their traditional boundaries, ensuring no side crosses into the other’s territory. A stream named Namjellok, which flows through Indian land, is shared with Kondong for water, showing good neighbourly cooperation.

== Border dispute and local concerns ==
Kwatha Khunou village has raised concerns about changes to the border. Villagers say the Indian government is allowing Myanmar to build border pillars inside Indian territory, ignoring old boundaries. They believe this could lead to losing land, homes, and even sacred sites. The village headman, Manihar Meitei, has accused the Survey of India of not including local people in border surveys and instead working with the Myanmar military. He and other villagers feel ignored and say they are the true protectors of the border who should be consulted.

A major issue arose around Border Pillar No. 81. According to villagers, this pillar used to stand in Kwatha Khunou but has now been moved about 3 kilometres into Indian land. This shift could result in about 3 square kilometres of Indian territory being given to Myanmar. Although local protests followed, the Government of India claimed there was no border dispute and called the media reports “baseless.”

Despite this, villagers remain firm in their claim. They explain that certain rocks, which now mark the new pillar site, were always seen as near the border but not the exact spot for the pillar. They believe the correct location is further inside.

=== Historical background and reactions ===
This issue reminded many in Manipur of the 1953 event when Prime Minister Jawaharlal Nehru gave away around 11,000 square kilometres of land, including the nearby Kabaw Valley, to Myanmar without consulting the people of Manipur. Civil society groups and opposition parties in the state have strongly criticised the current government, accusing it of silently allowing more land to be taken.

The situation has caused villagers to lose trust in the central and state governments. Some have even started expressing that if India will not protect them, they might consider turning to Myanmar for support.

== Security and border management ==
India shares over 1,600 kilometres (about 1,008 miles) of border with Myanmar. This border is largely open and poorly guarded, making it easy for people, goods, and even armed groups to move across. Several banned armed groups from India operate from bases in Myanmar. These groups use the open border to launch attacks and escape, sometimes with help from Myanmar’s military in exchange for illegal payments.

India started building a fence in 2013 to control this, but the work stopped due to disagreements between the two countries. Recently, India and Myanmar signed a new agreement to fix border alignment issues by building “subsidiary pillars” between the main pillars. Some believe this step is meant to restart the fencing project.

== See also ==
- Yangoupokpi-Lokchao Wildlife Sanctuary
- Meitei people in Myanmar
- Konthong Lairembi
- Meitei people in Bangladesh

== Additional sources ==
- Unrest over shifting of border pillar in Moreh at deccanherald.com
- Delhi to survey Manipur pillars at telegraphindia.com
- Manipur, where incursions by Myanmar soldiers are on the rise at thehindu.com
