= 11th Tripura Assembly =

Legislative Assembly of Tripura (2013–2018)

←	10th Tripura Assembly	12th Tripura Assembly	→

Overview
- Legislative body: Tripura Legislative Assembly
- Jurisdiction: Tripura, India
- Meeting place: Tripura Vidhan Sabha, Agartala
- Term: 2013 – 2018
- Election: 2013 Tripura Legislative Assembly election
- Government: Left Front (Tripura)
- Opposition: UPA
- Website: https://www.tripuraassembly.nic.in/
- Members: 60
- Chief Minister: Manik Sarkar (2013-2018)
- Leader of the Opposition: Ratan Lal Nath
- Party control: Communist Party of India (Marxist)

The Eleventh Tripura Assembly were formed by the members elected in the 2013 Tripura Legislative Assembly election. Elections were held in 60 constituencies of the state on 14 February 2013. Votes were counted on 28 February 2013.

== Party wise distribution of seats ==
Alliance	Party	No. of MLA's	Leader of the Party in Assembly	Leader's Constituency
Left Front (Tripura); Seats: 50	Communist Party of India (Marxist)	49	Manik Sarkar	Dhanpur
Left Front (Tripura); Seats: 50	Communist Party of India	1	Manindra Reang	Santirbazar
UPA; Seats: 10	Indian National Congress	10	Ratan Lal Nath	Mohanpur
Total no of MLA's				60

== Notable positions ==
S.No	Position	Portrait	Name	Party	Constituency	Office Taken
1	Speaker		Ramendra Chandra Debnath	Communist Party of India (Marxist)	Jubarajnagar	15 March 2013
2	Deputy Speaker		Pabitra Kar	Communist Party of India (Marxist)	Khayerpur	18 March 2013
3	Leader of the House (Chief Minister)		Manik Sarkar	Communist Party of India (Marxist)	Dhanpur	6 March 2013
4	Leader of Opposition		Ratan Lal Nath	Indian National Congress	Mohanpur	26 April 2013

== Members of Legislative Assembly ==
District	No.	Constituency	Name	Party	Alliance	Remarks
West Tripura	1	Simna (ST)	Pranab Debbarma	Communist Party of India	Left Front (Tripura)	
West Tripura	2	Mohanpur	Ratan Lal Nath	Indian National Congress	UPA	Leader of Opposition
West Tripura	3	Bamutia (SC)	Haricharan Sarkar	Communist Party of India (Marxist)	Left Front (Tripura)	
West Tripura	4	Barjala (SC)	Jitendra Sarkar	Indian National Congress	UPA	
West Tripura	4	Barjala (SC)	Jhumu Sarkar	Communist Party of India	Left Front (Tripura)	
West Tripura	5	Khayerpur	Pabitra Kar	Communist Party of India	Left Front (Tripura)	Deputy Speaker
West Tripura	6	Agartala	Sudip Roy Barman	Indian National Congress	UPA	
West Tripura	7	Ramnagar	Ratan Das	Communist Party of India	Left Front (Tripura)	
West Tripura	8	Town Bordowali	Ashish Kumar Saha	Indian National Congress	UPA	
West Tripura	9	Banamalipur	Gopal Chandra Roy	Indian National Congress	UPA	
West Tripura	10	Majlishpur	Manik Dey	Communist Party of India	Left Front (Tripura)	Cabinet Minister
West Tripura	11	Mandaibazar (ST)	Manoranjan Debbarma	Communist Party of India	Left Front (Tripura)	
Sipahijala	12	Takarjala (ST)	Niranjan Debbarma	Communist Party of India	Left Front (Tripura)	
West Tripura	13	Pratapgarh (SC)	Anil Sarkar	Communist Party of India	Left Front (Tripura)	Died on 11 February 2015
West Tripura	13	Pratapgarh (SC)	Ramu Das	Communist Party of India	Left Front (Tripura)	
West Tripura	14	Badharghat (SC)	Dilip Sarkar	Indian National Congress	UPA	
Sipahijala	15	Kamalasagar	Narayan Chandra Chowdhuri	Communist Party of India	Left Front (Tripura)	
Sipahijala	16	Bishalgarh	Bhanu Lal Saha	Communist Party of India	Left Front (Tripura)	
Sipahijala	17	Golaghati (ST)	Kesab Debbarma	Communist Party of India	Left Front (Tripura)	
West Tripura	18	Suryamaninagar	Raj Kumar Chaudhuri	Communist Party of India	Left Front (Tripura)	
Sipahijala	19	Charilam (ST)	Ramendra Narayan Debbarma	Communist Party of India	Left Front (Tripura)	
Sipahijala	20	Boxanagar	Sahid Choudhuri	Communist Party of India	Left Front (Tripura)	
Sipahijala	21	Nalchar (SC)	Tapan Chandra Das	Communist Party of India	Left Front (Tripura)	
Sipahijala	22	Sonamura	Shyamal Chakraborty	Communist Party of India	Left Front (Tripura)	
Sipahijala	23	Dhanpur	Manik Sarkar	Communist Party of India	Left Front (Tripura)	Chief Minister
Khowai	24	Ramchandraghat (ST)	Padma Kumar Debbarma	Communist Party of India	Left Front (Tripura)	
Khowai	25	Khowai	Samir Debsarkar	Communist Party of India	Left Front (Tripura)	
Khowai	26	Asharambari (ST)	Aghore Debbarma	Communist Party of India	Left Front (Tripura)	Cabinet Minister
Khowai	27	Kalyanpur-Pramodenagar	Manindra Chandra Das	Communist Party of India	Left Front (Tripura)	
Khowai	28	Teliamura	Gouri Das	Communist Party of India	Left Front (Tripura)	
Khowai	29	Krishnapur (ST)	Khagendra Jamatia	Communist Party of India	Left Front (Tripura)	Cabinet Minister
Gomati	30	Bagma (ST)	Naresh Jamatia	Communist Party of India	Left Front (Tripura)	
Gomati	31	Radhakishorpur	Pranjit Singha Roy	Indian National Congress	UPA	
Gomati	32	Matarbari	Madhab Chandra Saha	Communist Party of India	Left Front (Tripura)	
Gomati	33	Kakraban-Salgarh (SC)	Ratan Bhowmik	Communist Party of India	Left Front (Tripura)	Cabinet Minister
South Tripura	34	Rajnagar (SC)	Sudhan Das	Communist Party of India	Left Front (Tripura)	
South Tripura	35	Belonia	Basudev Majumder	Communist Party of India	Left Front (Tripura)	
South Tripura	36	Santirbazar (ST)	Manindra Reang	Communist Party of India	Left Front (Tripura)	
South Tripura	37	Hrishyamukh	Badal Choudhury	Communist Party of India	Left Front (Tripura)	
South Tripura	38	Jolaibari (ST)	Jashabir Tripura	Communist Party of India	Left Front (Tripura)	
South Tripura	39	Manu (ST)	Jitendra Chaudhury	Communist Party of India	Left Front (Tripura)	Resigend on 20 May 2014
South Tripura	39	Manu (ST)	Pravat Chowdhury	Communist Party of India	Left Front (Tripura)	
South Tripura	40	Sabroom	Rita Kar	Communist Party of India	Left Front (Tripura)	
Gomati	41	Ampinagar (ST)	Daniel Jamatia	Communist Party of India	Left Front (Tripura)	
Gomati	42	Amarpur	Manoranjan Acharjee	Communist Party of India	Left Front (Tripura)	
Gomati	43	Karbook (ST)	Priyamani Debbarma	Communist Party of India	Left Front (Tripura)	
Dhalai	44	Raima Valley (ST)	Lalit Mohan Tripura	Communist Party of India	Left Front (Tripura)	
Dhalai	45	Kamalpur	Bijoy Lakshmi Singha	Communist Party of India	Left Front (Tripura)	
Dhalai	46	Surma (SC)	Sudhir Das	Communist Party of India	Left Front (Tripura)	
Dhalai	47	Ambassa (ST)	Lalit Kumar Debbarma	Communist Party of India	Left Front (Tripura)	
Dhalai	48	Karamcherra (ST)	Diba Chandra Hrangkhawl	Indian National Congress	UPA	
Dhalai	49	Chawamanu (ST)	Nirajoy Tripura	Communist Party of India	Left Front (Tripura)	
Unakoti	50	Pabiachhara (SC)	Samiran Malakar	Communist Party of India	Left Front (Tripura)	
Unakoti	51	Fatikroy (SC)	Tunubala Malakar	Communist Party of India	Left Front (Tripura)	
Unakoti	52	Chandipur	Tapan Chakraborty	Communist Party of India	Left Front (Tripura)	
Unakoti	53	Kailashahar	Birajit Sinha	Indian National Congress	UPA	
North Tripura	54	Kadamtala-Kurti	Fayzur Rahaman	Communist Party of India	Left Front (Tripura)	
North Tripura	55	Bagbassa	Bijita Nath	Communist Party of India	Left Front (Tripura)	
North Tripura	56	Dharmanagar	Biswa Bandhu Sen	Indian National Congress	UPA	
North Tripura	57	Jubarajnagar	Ramendra Chandra Debnath	Communist Party of India	Left Front (Tripura)	
North Tripura	58	Panisagar	Subodh Chandra Das	Communist Party of India	Left Front (Tripura)	
North Tripura	59	Pencharthal (ST)	Arun Kumar Chakma	Communist Party of India	Left Front (Tripura)	
North Tripura	60	Kanchanpur (ST)	Rajendra Reang	Communist Party of India	Left Front (Tripura)	
