= Second Saha ministry =

Council of Ministers headed by Chief Minister Manik Saha

- 14th Ministry of Tripura

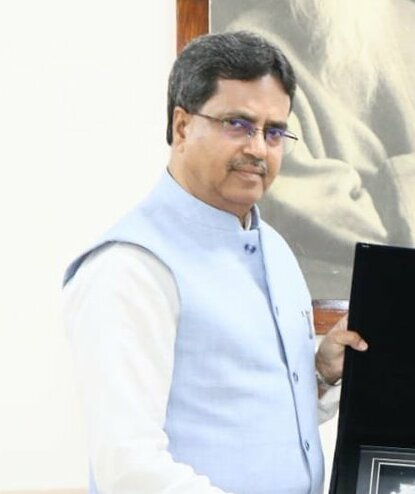
- Date formed: 8 March 2023

People and organisations
- Governor: Satyadev Narayan Arya; Indrasena Reddy
- Chief Minister: Manik Saha
- Member parties: NDA: BJP(9 Ministers as of now); TMP(2 Ministers as of now); IPFT(1 Minister)
- Opposition party: SDF: CPI(M); INC
- Opposition leader: Jitendra Chaudhury

History
- Election: 2023
- Legislature term: 5 years
- Predecessor: Saha I

The Second ministry of Manik Saha is the council of ministers headed by Chief Minister Manik Saha, which was formed after 2023 Tripura Legislative Assembly election which was held in 16 February in the state. The results were declared on 2 March and this led to formation of 13th Tripura Assembly.

Manik Saha is the leader of Bharatiya Janata Party who is sworn as the Chief Ministers of Tripura on 8 March 2023, which led to the formation of his ministry for the second time and the current Government of Tripura. He was administered the oath by Governor Satyadev Narayan Arya in presence of the Prime Minister of India Narendra Modi, Home Minister Amit Shah, BJP National president J. P. Nadda at Swami Vivekananda Stadium in Agartala.

The Bharatiya Janata Party-led NDA secured a comfortable majority in Tripura winning 32 seats of the total 60 constituencies. While BJP secured 32 seats, its allies IPFT 1 seats respectively. Later TMP joined NDA, increaseing the government's seats to 47.

== Council of Ministers ==
- As in March 2023

S.No	Name	Constituency	Department	Took office	Left office	Party
Chief Minister
1.	Manik Saha	Town Bordowali	Home; Health & Family Welfare; PWD; Other departments not allocated to any Minister.	8 March 2023	Incumbent	BJP
Cabinet Ministers
2.	Ratan Lal Nath	Mohanpur	Power; Agriculture & Farmers' Welfare; Law (Parliamentary Affairs); Election	10 March 2023	Incumbent	BJP
3.	Pranjit Singha Roy	Radhakishorpur	Finance; Planning and Coordination; Information Technology	10 March 2023	Incumbent	BJP
4.	Santana Chakma	Pencharthal	Industries and commerce; Jail(Home); Welfare of OBCs	10 March 2023	Incumbent	BJP
5.	Sushanta Chowdhury	Majlishpur	Food, Civil Supplies & Consumer Affairs; Transport; Tourism	10 March 2023	Incumbent	BJP
6.	Tinku Roy	Chandipur	Youth Affairs & Sports; Social Welfare & Social Education; Labour	10 March 2023	Incumbent	BJP
7.	Bikash Debbarma	Krishnapur	Tribal Welfare; Handloom, Handicrafts & Sericulture; Statistics	10 March 2023	Incumbent	BJP
8.	Sudhangshu Das	Fatikroy	Welfare of Schedule castes; Animal Resource development; Fisheries	10 March 2023	Incumbent	BJP
9.	Sukla Charan Noatia	Jolaibari	Cooperation; Tribal Welfare(TRP & PTG); Welfare of Minorities	10 March 2023	Incumbent	IPFT
10.	Animesh Debbarma	Ashrambari	Forests; General Administration (Printing & Stationery); Science, Technology, and Environment	7 March 2024	Incumbent	TMP
11.	Kishor Barman	Nalchar	Higher Education; General Administration (Political); Panchayat	3 July 2025	Incumbent	BJP
Minister of State
1.	Brishaketu Debbarma	Simna	Industries & Commerce(Minister of State)	7 March 2024	Incumbent	TMP

== Demography of Council of Ministers ==
District	Ministers	Name of ministers
Dhalai	0	-
Gomati	1	Pranjit Singha Roy
Khowai	2	Animesh Debbarma; Bikash Debbarma
Sipahijala	1	Kishor Barman
Unakoti	2	Sudhangshu Das; Tinku Roy
North Tripura	1	Santana Chakma
South Tripura	1	Sukla Charan Noatia
West Tripura	4	Brishaketu Debbarma; Manik Saha; Ratan Lal Nath; Sushanta Chowdhury

== See also ==
- List of departments of the government of Tripura
