= 12th Tripura Assembly =

Legislative Assembly of Tripura (2018–2023)

←	11th Tripura Assembly	13th Tripura Assembly	→

Overview
- Legislative body: Tripura Legislative Assembly
- Jurisdiction: Tripura, India
- Meeting place: Tripura Vidhan Sabha, Agartala
- Term: 2018 – 2023
- Election: 2018 Tripura Legislative Assembly election
- Government: National Democratic Alliance
- Opposition: Left Front (Tripura)
- Website: https://www.tripuraassembly.nic.in/
- Members: 60
- Chief Minister: Biplab Kumar Deb (2018-2022); Manik Saha (2022-2023)
- Deputy Chief Ministers: Jishnu Dev Varma
- Leader of the Opposition: Manik Sarkar
- Party control: Bharatiya Janata Party

The 12th Tripura Assembly (Twelfth Vidhan Sabha of Tripura) were formed by the members elected in the 2018 Tripura Legislative Assembly election. Elections were held in 59 constituencies of the state on 18 February 2018. Votes were counted on 3 March 2018.

== Party wise distribution of seats ==
Alliance	Party	No. of MLA's	Leader of the Party in Assembly	Leader's Constituency
National Democratic Alliance; Seats: 44	Bharatiya Janata Party	36	Biplab Kumar Deb	Banamalipur
National Democratic Alliance; Seats: 44	Indigenous People's Front of Tripura	8	N.C Debbarma	Takarjala
Left Front; Seats: 16	Communist Party of India (Marxist)	16	Manik Sarkar	Dhanpur
Total no of MLA's				60

== Members ==
No.	Constituency	Name	Party	Alliance	Remarks
West Tripura district
1	Simna	Brishaketu Debbarma	Indigenous People's Front of Tripura	NEDA	Disqualified on 20 September 2022 by the Speaker
2	Mohanpur	Ratan Lal Nath	Bharatiya Janata Party	NEDA	
3	Bamutia	Krishnadhan Das	Bharatiya Janata Party	NEDA	
4	Barjala	Dilip Kumar Das	Bharatiya Janata Party	NEDA	
5	Khayerpur	Ratan Chakraborty	Bharatiya Janata Party	NEDA	
6	Agartala	Sudip Roy Barman	Bharatiya Janata Party	NEDA	Resigned on 7 February 2022
6	Agartala	Sudip Roy Barman	Indian National Congress	UPA	Elected in bye-election
7	Ramnagar	Surajit Datta	Bharatiya Janata Party	NEDA	
8	Town Bordowali	Ashis Saha	Bharatiya Janata Party	NEDA	Resigned on 7 February 2022
8	Town Bordowali	Manik Saha	Bharatiya Janata Party	NEDA	Elected in bye-election
9	Banamalipur	Biplab Kumar Deb	Bharatiya Janata Party	NEDA	CM designate
10	Majlishpur	Sushanta Chowdhury	Bharatiya Janata Party	NEDA	
11	Mandai Bazar	Dhirendra Debbarma	Indigenous People's Front of Tripura	NEDA	
Sipahijala district
12	Takarjala	N.C Debbarma	Indigenous People's Front of Tripura	NEDA	Leader of the Party(LoP), Died on 1 January 2023
West Tripura district
13	Pratapgarh	Rebati Mohan Das	Bharatiya Janata Party	NEDA	
14	Badharghat	Dilip Sarkar	Bharatiya Janata Party	NEDA	Died on 1 April 2019
14	Badharghat	Mimi Majumder	Bharatiya Janata Party	NEDA	Elected on bye-election
Sipahijala district
15	Kamalasagar	Narayan Chandra Chowdhuri	Communist Party of India	LF	
16	Bishalgarh	Bhanulal Saha	Communist Party of India	LF	
17	Golaghati	Birendra Kishore Debbarma	Bharatiya Janata Party	NEDA	
West Tripura district
18	Surjamaninagar	Ram Prasad Paul	Bharatiya Janata Party	NEDA	
Sipahijala district
19	Charilam	Jishnu Dev Varma	Bharatiya Janata Party	NEDA	Deputy CM designate
20	Boxanagar	Sahid Choudhuri	Communist Party of India	LF	
21	Nalchar	Subhash Chandra Das	Bharatiya Janata Party	NEDA	
22	Sonamura	Shyamal Chakraborty	Communist Party of India	LF	
23	Dhanpur	Manik Sarkar	Communist Party of India	LF	
Khowai district
24	Ramchandraghat	Prashanta Debbarma	Indigenous People's Front of Tripura	NEDA	
25	Khowai	Nirmal Biswas	Communist Party of India	LF	
26	Asharambari	Mevar Kumar Jamatia	Indigenous People's Front of Tripura	NEDA	
27	Kalyanpur–Pramodnagar	Pinaki Das Chowdhury	Bharatiya Janata Party	NEDA	
28	Teliamura	Kalyani Roy	Bharatiya Janata Party	NEDA	
29	Krishnapur	Atul Debbarma	Bharatiya Janata Party	NEDA	
Gomati district
30	Bagma	Ram Pada Jamatia	Bharatiya Janata Party	NEDA	
31	Radhakishorpur	Pranjit Singha Roy	Bharatiya Janata Party	NEDA	
32	Matarbari	Biplab Kumar Ghosh	Bharatiya Janata Party	NEDA	
33	Kakraban-Salgarh	Ratan Chakrabarty	Communist Party of India	LF	
South Tripura district
34	Rajnagar	Sudhan Das	Communist Party of India	LF	
35	Belonia	Arun Chandra Bhaumik	Bharatiya Janata Party	NEDA	
36	Santirbazar	Pramod Reang	Bharatiya Janata Party	NEDA	
37	Hrishyamukh	Badal Choudhury	Communist Party of India	LF	
38	Jolaibari	Jashabir Tripura	Communist Party of India	LF	
39	Manu	Pravat Chowdhury	Communist Party of India	LF	
40	Sabroom	Sankar Roy	Bharatiya Janata Party	NEDA	
Gomati district
41	Ampinagar	Sindhu Chandra Jamatia	Indigenous People's Front of Tripura	NEDA	
42	Amarpur	Ranjit Das	Bharatiya Janata Party	NEDA	
43	Karbook	Burba Mohan Tripura	Bharatiya Janata Party	NEDA	Resigned on 23 September 2022
Dhalai district
44	Raima Valley	Dhananjoy Tripura	Indigenous People's Front of Tripura	NEDA	
45	Kamalpur	Manoj Kanti Deb	Bharatiya Janata Party	NEDA	
46	Surma	Ashis Das	Bharatiya Janata Party	NEDA	Resigned on 5 October 2021
46	Surma	Swapna Das	Bharatiya Janata Party	NEDA	Elected on bye-election
47	Ambassa	Parimal Debbarma	Bharatiya Janata Party	NEDA	
48	Karamcherra	Diba Chandra Hrangkhawl	Bharatiya Janata Party	NEDA	Resigned on 28 December 2022
49	Chawamanu	Sambhu Lal Chakma	Bharatiya Janata Party	NEDA	
Unakoti district
50	Pabiachhara	Bhagaban Das	Bharatiya Janata Party	NEDA	
51	Fatikroy	Sudhangshu Das	Bharatiya Janata Party	NEDA	
52	Chandipur	Tapan Chakrabarty	Communist Party of India	LF	
53	Kailashahar	Moboshar Ali	Communist Party of India	LF	
North Tripura district
54	Kadamtala-Kurti	Islam Uddin	Communist Party of India	LF	
55	Bagbassa	Bijita Nath	Communist Party of India	LF	
56	Dharmanagar	Biswa Bandhu Sen	Bharatiya Janata Party	NEDA	
57	Jubarajnagar	Ramendra Chandra Debnath	Communist Party of India	LF	Died on 1 February 2022
57	Jubarajnagar	Malina Debnath	Bharatiya Janata Party	NEDA	Elected on bye-election
58	Panisagar	Binay Bhushan Das	Bharatiya Janata Party	NEDA	
59	Pencharthal	Santana Chakma	Bharatiya Janata Party	NEDA	
60	Kanchanpur	Prem Kumar Reang	Indigenous People's Front of Tripura	NEDA	
