= 13th Tripura Assembly =

Legislative Assembly of Tripura from 2023

←	Twelfth Tripura Assembly

Overview
- Legislative body: Tripura Legislative Assembly
- Jurisdiction: Tripura, India
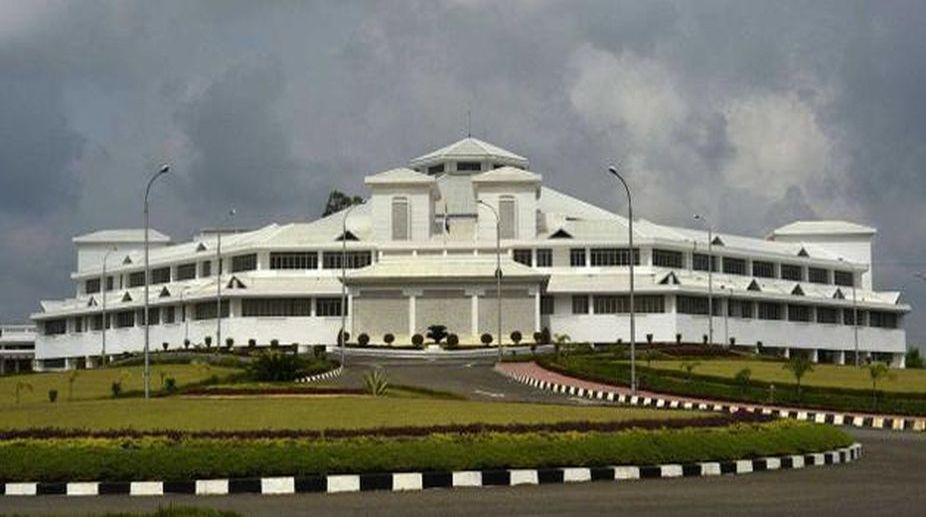
- Meeting place: Tripura Vidhan Sabha, Agartala
- Term: 2023 – 2028
- Election: 2023 Tripura Legislative Assembly election
- Government: National Democratic Alliance
- Opposition: Secular Democratic Forces
- Website: https://www.tripuraassembly.nic.in/
- Members: 60
- Chief Minister: Manik Saha
- Speaker of the Assembly: Ram Pada Jamatia
- Deputy Speaker of the Assembly: Ram Prasad Paul
- Leader of the Opposition: Jitendra Chaudhury
- Party control: Bharatiya Janata Party

The Thirteenth Tripura Assembly was formed after 2023 Tripura Legislative Assembly election. Elections were held in 60 constituencies on 16 February 2023. Votes were counted on 2 March 2023.

== History ==
Bharatiya Janata Party led alliance won election with 34(BJP 33 + IPFT 1) seats while newcomer Tipra Motha Party become second largest party with 13 seats. Communist Party of India (Marxist) led Secular Democratic Forces won 14(11 CPIM + 3 INC).

== Notable positions ==
S.No	Position	Portrait	Name	Party	Constituency	Office Taken
1	Speaker		Ram Pada Jamatia	Bharatiya Janata Party	Bagma	18 March 2026
2	Deputy Speaker		Ram Prasad Paul	Bharatiya Janata Party	Suyamaninagar	28 March 2023
3	Leader of the House (Chief Minister)		Manik Saha	Bharatiya Janata Party	Town Bardowali	13 March 2023
4	Leader of Opposition		Jitendra Chaudhury	Communist Party of India (Marxist)	Sabroom	6 March 2024

== Party wise distribution ==
Current partywise distribution of the 13th Tripura Legislative Assembly

Alliance	Party	No. of MLA's		Leader of the Party in Assembly	Leader's Constituency
National Democratic Alliance	Bharatiya Janata Party	33	47	Manik Saha	Town Bordowali
National Democratic Alliance	Tipra Motha Party	13	47	Animesh Debbarma	Asharambari
National Democratic Alliance	Indigenous People's Front of Tripura	1	47	Sukla Charan Noatia	Jolaibari
Secular Democratic Forces	Communist Party of India (Marxist)	10	13	Jitendra Chaudhury	Sabroom
Secular Democratic Forces	Indian National Congress	3	13	Birajit Sinha	Kailashahar
Total no. of MLAs		60			

== Members of Legislative Assembly ==
District	No.	Constituency	Name	Party	Alliance	Remarks
West Tripura	1	Simna (ST)	Brishaketu Debbarma	TMP	NDA	Minister of State
West Tripura	2	Mohanpur	Ratan Lal Nath	BJP	NDA	Cabinet Minister
West Tripura	3	Bamutia (SC)	Nayan Sarkar	CPI(M)	SDF	
West Tripura	4	Barjala (SC)	Sudip Sarkar	CPI(M)	SDF	
West Tripura	5	Khayerpur	Ratan Chakraborty	BJP	NDA	
West Tripura	6	Agartala	Sudip Roy Barman	INC	SDF	
West Tripura	7	Ramnagar	Surajit Datta	BJP	NDA	Died on 27 December 2023
West Tripura	7	Ramnagar	Dipak Majumder	BJP	NDA	
West Tripura	8	Town Bordowali	Manik Saha	BJP	NDA	Chief Minister
West Tripura	9	Banamalipur	Gopal Chandra Roy	INC	SDF	
West Tripura	10	Majlishpur	Sushanta Chowdhury	BJP	NDA	Cabinet Minister
West Tripura	11	Mandaibazar (ST)	Swapna Debbarma	TMP	NDA	
Sipahijala	12	Takarjala (ST)	Biswajit Kalai	TMP	NDA	
West Tripura	13	Pratapgarh (SC)	Ramu Das	CPI(M)	SDF	
West Tripura	14	Badharghat (SC)	Mina Rani Sarkar	BJP	NDA	
Sipahijala	15	Kamalasagar	Antara Sarkar Deb	BJP	NDA	
Sipahijala	16	Bishalgarh	Sushanta Deb	BJP	NDA	
Sipahijala	17	Golaghati (ST)	Manab Debbarma	TMP	NDA	
West Tripura	18	Suryamaninagar	Ram Prasad Paul	BJP	NDA	
Sipahijala	19	Charilam (ST)	Subodh Deb Barma	TMP	NDA	
Sipahijala	20	Boxanagar	Samsul Haque	CPI(M)	SDF	Died on 19 July 2023
Sipahijala	20	Boxanagar	Tafajjal Hossain	BJP	NDA	Elected in September 2023 by-election
Sipahijala	21	Nalchar (SC)	Kishor Barman	BJP	NDA	Cabinet Minister
Sipahijala	22	Sonamura	Shyamal Chakraborty	CPI(M)	SDF	
Sipahijala	23	Dhanpur	Pratima Bhoumik	BJP	NDA	Resigned on 15 March 2023
Sipahijala	23	Dhanpur	Bindu Debnath	BJP	NDA	Elected in September 2023 by-election
Khowai	24	Ramchandraghat (ST)	Ranjit Debbarma	TMP	NDA	
Khowai	25	Khowai	Nirmal Biswas	CPI(M)	SDF	
Khowai	26	Asharambari (ST)	Animesh Debbarma	TMP	NDA	Cabinet Minister
Khowai	27	Kalyanpur-Pramodenagar	Pinaki Das Chowdhury	BJP	NDA	
Khowai	28	Teliamura	Kalyani Saha Roy	BJP	NDA	
Khowai	29	Krishnapur (ST)	Bikash Debbarma	BJP	NDA	Cabinet Minister
Gomati	30	Bagma (ST)	Ram Pada Jamatia	BJP	NDA	Speaker
Gomati	31	Radhakishorpur	Pranjit Singha Roy	BJP	NDA	Cabinet Minister
Gomati	32	Matarbari	Abhishek Debroy	BJP	NDA	
Gomati	33	Kakraban-Salgarh (SC)	Jitendra Majumder	BJP	NDA	
South Tripura	34	Rajnagar (SC)	Swapna Majumder	BJP	NDA	
South Tripura	35	Belonia	Dipankar Sen	CPI(M)	SDF	
South Tripura	36	Santirbazar (ST)	Pramod Reang	BJP	NDA	
South Tripura	37	Hrishyamukh	Asoke Chandra Mitra	CPI(M)	SDF	
South Tripura	38	Jolaibari (ST)	Sukla Charan Noatia	IPFT	NDA	Cabinet Minister
South Tripura	39	Manu (ST)	Mailafru Mog	BJP	NDA	
South Tripura	40	Sabroom	Jitendra Chaudhury	CPI(M)	SDF	Leader of Opposition
Gomati	41	Ampinagar (ST)	Pathan Lal Jamatia	TMP	NDA	
Gomati	42	Amarpur	Ranjit Das	BJP	NDA	
Gomati	43	Karbook (ST)	Sanjoy Manik Tripura	TMP	NDA	
Dhalai	44	Raima Valley (ST)	Nandita Debbarma (Reang)	TMP	NDA	
Dhalai	45	Kamalpur	Manoj Kanti Deb	BJP	NDA	
Dhalai	46	Surma (SC)	Swapna Das Paul	BJP	NDA	
Dhalai	47	Ambassa (ST)	Chitta Ranjan Debbarma	TMP	NDA	
Dhalai	48	Karamcherra (ST)	Paul Dangshu	TMP	NDA	
Dhalai	49	Chawamanu (ST)	Sambhu Lal Chakma	BJP	NDA	
Unakoti	50	Pabiachhara (SC)	Bhagaban Das	BJP	NDA	
Unakoti	51	Fatikroy (SC)	Sudhangshu Das	BJP	NDA	Cabinet Minister
Unakoti	52	Chandipur	Tinku Roy	BJP	NDA	Cabinet Minister
Unakoti	53	Kailashahar	Birajit Sinha	INC	SDF	Congress Legislative Party Leader
North Tripura	54	Kadamtala-Kurti	Islam Uddin	CPI(M)	SDF	
North Tripura	55	Bagbassa	Jadab Lal Debnath	BJP	NDA	
North Tripura	56	Dharmanagar	Biswa Bandhu Sen	BJP	NDA	Speaker, died on 26 December 2025.
North Tripura	56	Dharmanagar	Jahar Chakraborti	BJP	NDA	
North Tripura	57	Jubarajnagar	Sailendra Chandra Nath	CPI(M)	SDF	
North Tripura	58	Panisagar	Binay Bhushan Das	BJP	NDA	
North Tripura	59	Pencharthal (ST)	Santana Chakma	BJP	NDA	Cabinet Minister
North Tripura	60	Kanchanpur (ST)	Philip Kumar Reang	TMP	NDA	
