= List of speakers of the Tripura Legislative Assembly =

List of the speakers of Tripura Assembly

Speaker of the Tripura Legislative Assembly
- Seal of Tripura
- Incumbent; Ram Pada Jamatia since 18 March 2026
- Tripura Legislative Assembly
- Style: The Hon’ble (formal); Mr. Speaker (informal)
- Member of: Tripura Legislative Assembly
- Reports to: Government of Tripura
- Residence: Agartala
- Appointer: Members of the Legislative Assembly
- Term length: During the life of the Tripura Legislative Assembly (five years maximum)
- Inaugural holder: Upendra Kumar Roy (1 July 1963—11 January 1967)
- Deputy: Ram Prasad Paul

The Speaker of the Tripura Legislative Assembly is the presiding officer of the Legislative Assembly of Tripura, the main law-making body for the Indian state of Tripura. The Speaker is elected generally in the first meeting of the Tripura Legislative Assembly after the general elections for a term of 5 years from amongst the members of the assembly. The speaker is chosen from sitting members of the Tripura Legislative Assembly. The Speaker can be removed from office by a resolution passed in the assembly by an effective majority of its members. In the absence of Speaker, the meeting of Tripura Legislative Assembly is presided by the Deputy Speaker.

== Eligibility ==
- Being a citizen of India;
- Not be less than 25 years of age;
- Not holding any office of profit under the Government of Tripura; and
- Not being a Criminal Offender.

== List of the Speakers ==
No	Portrait	Name	Constituency	Term			Assembly	Party
1		Upendra Kumar Roy		1 July 1963	11 January 1967	3 years, 194 days	1st	Indian National Congress
2		Manindra Lal Bhowmik	Kailashahar	14 March 1967	20 January 1972	10 years, 315 days	2nd	Indian National Congress
2		Manindra Lal Bhowmik	Chandipur	29 March 1972	23 January 1978	10 years, 315 days	3rd	Indian National Congress
3		Sudhanwa Debbarma	Takarjala	24 January 1978	6 January 1983	4 years, 347 days	4th	Communist Party of India (Marxist)
4		Amarendra Sharma	Dharmanagar	9 February 1983	4 February 1988	4 years, 360 days	5th	Communist Party of India (Marxist)
5		Jyotirmoy Nath	Kadamtala	29 February 1988	7 April 1993	5 years, 38 days	6th	Indian National Congress
6		Bimal Sinha	Kamalpur	14 May 1993	22 September 1995	2 years, 131 days	7th	Communist Party of India (Marxist)
7		Jitendra Sarkar	Teliamura	12 October 1995	10 March 1998	7 years, 146 days	7th	Communist Party of India (Marxist)
7		Jitendra Sarkar	Teliamura	23 March 1998	7 March 2003	7 years, 146 days	8th	Communist Party of India (Marxist)
8		Ramendra Chandra Debnath	Jubarajnagar	20 March 2003	3 March 2008	14 years, 358 days	9th	Communist Party of India (Marxist)
8		Ramendra Chandra Debnath	Jubarajnagar	17 March 2008	6 March 2013	14 years, 358 days	10th	Communist Party of India (Marxist)
8		Ramendra Chandra Debnath	Jubarajnagar	15 March 2013	13 March 2018	14 years, 358 days	11th	Communist Party of India (Marxist)
9		Rebati Mohan Das	Pratapgarh	23 March 2018	2 September 2021	3 years, 163 days	12th	Bharatiya Janata Party
10		Ratan Chakraborty	Khayerpur	24 September 2021	12 March 2023	1 year, 169 days	12th	Bharatiya Janata Party
11		Biswa Bandhu Sen	Dharmanagar	24 March 2023	26 December 2025	2 years, 277 days	13th	Bharatiya Janata Party
12		Ram Pada Jamatia	Bagma	18 March 2026	Incumbent	173 days	13th	Bharatiya Janata Party

== List of the Deputy Speakers ==
No	Portrait	Name	Constituency	Term			Assembly	Party
1		Md. Ersad Ali Choudhury		1 July 1963	11 January 1967	3 years, 194 days	1st	Indian National Congress
2		Manoranjan Nath	Dharmanagar South	21 March 1967	1 November 1971	4 years, 225 days	2nd	Indian National Congress
3		Usha Ranjan Sen	Radhakishorpur	29 March 1972	4 November 1977	5 years, 220 days	3rd	Indian National Congress
4		Jyotirmoy Das	Belonia	27 January 1978	6 January 1983	4 years, 344 days	4th	Communist Party of India
5		Bimal Sinha	Kamalpur	11 February 1983	4 February 1988	4 years, 358 days	5th	Communist Party of India
6		Rati Mohan Jamatia	Bagma	14 March 1988	16 May 1992	4 years, 63 days	6th	Tripura Upajati Juba Samiti
7		Gouri Sankar Reang	Santirbazar	17 September 1992	28 February 1993	164 days	6th	Tripura Upajati Juba Samiti
8		Niranjan Debbarma	Golaghati	17 May 1993	9 October 1995	2 years, 145 days	7th	Communist Party of India
9		Sunil Kumar Chowdhury	Sabroom	12 October 1995	10 March 1998	2 years, 149 days	7th	Communist Party of India
10		Subal Rudra	Sonamura	26 March 1998	26 February 2003	9 years, 343 days	8th	Communist Party of India
10		Subal Rudra	Sonamura	25 March 2003	3 March 2008	9 years, 343 days	9th	Communist Party of India
11		Bhanu Lal Saha	Bishalgarh	19 March 2008	28 February 2013	4 years, 346 days	10th	Communist Party of India
12		Pabitra Kar	Khayerpur	18 March 2013	08 March 2018	4 years, 360 days	11th	Communist Party of India
13		Biswa Bandhu Sen	Dharmanagar	21 June 2018	13 March 2023	4 years, 265 days	12th	Bharatiya Janata Party
14		Ram Prasad Paul	Suryamaninagar	28 March 2023	Incumbent	3 years, 163 days	13th	Bharatiya Janata Party
Source link:

== Pro tem Speaker ==
=== List of Pro tem Speakers ===
- Niranjan Debbarma 2013
- Ratan Chakraborty 2018
- Binoy Bhusan Das 2023

== See also ==
- Tripura Legislative Assembly
- Speaker of the Lok Sabha
- Speaker of the Lok Sabha
- List of current Indian legislative speakers and chairmen
