= List of departments of the government of Tripura =

Government of Tripura governs the Indian state of Tripura. Tripura Government Departments are the administrative bodies of the Government of Tripura in the Indian state of Tripura. The departments grouped under ministerial portfolios headed by the members of Tripura Council of Ministers.

== List ==
There are 51 departments as follows:

- Agriculture and Farmers Welfare
- Animal Resource
- Biotechnology
- Cooperation
- Drinking Water & Sanitation
- Economics and Statistics
- Education(Elementary)
- Education(Higher)
- Education(Secondary)
- Election Department
- Employment Service and Manpower
- Factories and Boilers
- Finance
- Fire & Emergency Service
- Fisheries
- Food Civil Supplies and Consumers Affairs
- Forest
- General Administration (Administrative & Reforms)
- General Administration (Confidential & Cabinet)
- General Administration (Good Governance)
- General Administration (Personnel & Training)
- General Administration (Political)
- General Administration (Printing & Stationery)
- General Administration (Secretariat & Administration)
- Governor's Secretariat
- Health and Family Welfare
- Horticulture and Soil Conservation
- Industries and Commerce
- Information and Cultural Affairs
- Information Technology
- Labour
- Land Records & Settlement
- Law and Parliamentary Affairs
- Panchayat
- Planning and Coordination
- Police
- Prison
- Public Works Department (PWD)
- Revenue
- Rural Development
- Science Technology and Environment
- Small Savings, Group Insurance & Institutional Finance
- Social Welfare and Social Education
- Taxes and Excise
- Transport
- Tribal Welfare
- Urban Development
- Welfare for Minorities
- Welfare for OBC
- Welfare of SCs
- Youth Affairs & Sports

== See also ==
- Union government ministries of India
