= Tripura State Pollution Control Board =

Government agency for controlling pollution in Tripura

Agency overview
- Formed: 1988
- Jurisdiction: Government of Tripura
- Headquarters: Agartala, Tripura, India
- Minister responsible: Animesh Debbarma, Cabinet Minister, Government of Tripura
- Agency executive: Dr. K. Sasikumar, Chairman of the Board
- Parent agency: Department of Science, Technology, and Environment, Government of Tripura
- Website: tspcb.tripura.gov.in

Tripura State Pollution Control Board (TSPCB) is the governing body to monitor, control and prevent pollution in the state of Tripura. It operates under the Department of Science, Technology, and Environment, Government of Tripura.

== History ==
The Government of Tripura established the Tripura State Pollution Control Board (TSPCB) in 1988 under the Water (Prevention and Control of Pollution) Act of 1974 and the Air (Prevention and Control of Pollution) Act of 1981.
