= Nistha Chakraborty =

Indian kickboxer

Nistha Chakraborty, also spelt as Nishtha Chakraborty, is an Indian kick boxer from Tripura.

== Personal life ==
She was born into a Bengali family in Tripura, northeastern state of India. Her father is Hiralal Chakraborty. She is a student of humanities at Holy Cross College.

== Career ==
She is coached by Pinaki Chakraborty.

She won a gold medal in the WAKO Diamond World Cup 2018 in Russia.

She won a gold medal and two silvers in the ninth world kick-boxing championship in the Russian city of Anapa.

She won a bronze medal in the 4th Asian Pencak Silat championship.

== Honour ==
She was appointed ambassador of women's empowerment by the Government of Tripura in 2018.
