= Department of Public Elections (Tripura) =

Government department of Tripura state, India

Agency overview
- Jurisdiction: Tripura
- Headquarters: Agartala
- Minister responsible: Ratan Lal Nath, Minister of Elections Department
- Agency executive: Brijesh Pandey (IAS), CEO, Tripura
- Parent agency: Government of Tripura
- Website: Public Elections Department

The Department of Public Elections is one of the departments of Government of Tripura.

== Objective and functions ==
The department is responsible for facilitating the conduct of free and fair elections in coordination with the Election Commission of India and its affiliated bodies. The department is responsible for the custody and storage infrastructure of Electronic Voting Machines (EVMs), management of election-related IT systems, preparation and revision of electoral rolls, issuance of voter identity cards, promotion of voter awareness initiatives, and the appointment of polling officials and observers as directed by the Election Commission.

== See also ==
- Tripura State Election Commission
- Election Commissioner of India
