= List of constituencies of the Tripura Legislative Assembly =

Tripura Legislative Assembly
- 13th Legislative Assembly of Tripura

Type
- Type: Unicameral
- Term limits: 5 years
- Established: 1963
- Seats: 60

Elections
- Voting system: First past the post
- Last election: 2023
- Next election: 2028

Meeting place
- Tripura Legislative Assembly, Gurkhabasti, Agartala, Tripura, India

Website
- www.tripuraassembly.nic.in

Location of Tripura (highlighted in red) within India

The Tripura Legislative Assembly is the unicameral legislature of the state of Tripura, in Northeast India. The seat of the legislative assembly is at Agartala, the capital of the state. The assembly sits for a term of five years, unless it is dissolved early. Tripura is the third-smallest state in India, covering 10,491 km^{2} (4,051 sq mi); and the seventh-least populous state with a population of 3.67 million. The Tripura Legislative Assembly has existed since 1963, when it had 30 constituencies. Since 1972, it has had 60 single-seat constituencies, each of which directly elects a representative.

Since the independence of India, the Scheduled Castes (SC) and Scheduled Tribes (ST) have been given reservation status, guaranteeing political representation, and the Constitution lays down the general principles of positive discrimination for SCs and STs. The 2011 census of India stated that indigenous people constitute 32% of the state's total population. The Scheduled Tribes have been granted a reservation of 20 seats in the assembly, while 10 constituencies are reserved for candidates of the Scheduled Castes.

== History ==
Tripura became a Union Territory of India on 1 September 1956. A 30-member electoral college was established. In 1957, this was replaced by a 32-member Territorial Council consisting of 30 elected members, and 2 appointed by the national government. In 1963, the Territorial Council was dissolved, and the members transferred to a newly created Legislative Assembly. The first elections to the Legislative Assembly occurred in 1967. Full statehood was granted to the territory in 1971, by the passing of the North-Eastern Areas (Reorganisation) Act, 1971. The number of constituencies was doubled to 60 at the same time.

Changes in the constituencies of the Tripura Legislative Assembly over time
Year	Act	Effect	Total seats	Reserved seats		Election(s)
Year	Act	Effect	Total seats	SC	ST	Election(s)
1963	Government of Union Territories Act, 1963	The legislative assembly was created with 30 elected seats.	30	3	9	1967
1971	North-Eastern Areas (Reorganisation) Act, 1971	Tripura was converted from a Union Territory to a state. The size of the assembly was increased to 60.	60	5	19	1972
1976	Delimitation of Parliamentary and Assembly Constituencies Order, 1976	There were changes in the reservation status and area covered by constituencies.	60	7	19	1977
1983			60	7	20	1983
1988			60	7	17	1988
1993			60	7	20	1993, 1998, 2003, and 2008
2008	Delimitation of Parliamentary and Assembly Constituencies Order, 2008	There were changes in the reservation status and area covered by constituencies.	60	10	20	2013, 2018, and 2023

== Constituencies ==
The constituencies of Tripura with their reservation status indicated by colour

Reservation
Scheduled Castes (SC)
Scheduled Tribes (ST)

Constituencies of the Tripura Legislative Assembly
No.	Name	Reserved for (SC/ST/None)	District	Electorate (2023)	Lok Sabha constituency
1	Simna	ST	West Tripura	38,536	Tripura West
2	Mohanpur	None	West Tripura	46,869	Tripura West
3	Bamutia	SC	West Tripura	46,947	Tripura West
4	Barjala	SC	West Tripura	47,145	Tripura West
5	Khayerpur	None	West Tripura	51,278	Tripura West
6	Agartala	None	West Tripura	52,849	Tripura West
7	Ramnagar	None	West Tripura	45,411	Tripura West
8	Town Bordowali	None	West Tripura	47,162	Tripura West
9	Banamalipur	None	West Tripura	41,466	Tripura West
10	Majlishpur	None	West Tripura	49,045	Tripura West
11	Mandaibazar	ST	West Tripura	47,642	Tripura West
12	Takarjala	ST	Sipahijala	44,510	Tripura West
13	Pratapgarh	SC	West Tripura	57,803	Tripura West
14	Badharghat	SC	West Tripura	62,207	Tripura West
15	Kamalasagar	None	Sipahijala	43,634	Tripura West
16	Bishalgarh	None	Sipahijala	49,898	Tripura West
17	Golaghati	ST	Sipahijala	42,531	Tripura West
18	Suryamaninagar	None	West Tripura	42,531	Tripura West
19	Charilam	ST	Sipahijala	39,998	Tripura West
20	Boxanagar	None	Sipahijala	43,145	Tripura West
21	Nalchar	SC	Sipahijala	44,814	Tripura West
22	Sonamura	None	Sipahijala	44,540	Tripura West
23	Dhanpur	None	Sipahijala	50,223	Tripura West
24	Ramchandraghat	ST	Khowai	41,608	Tripura East
25	Khowai	None	Khowai	42,949	Tripura East
26	Asharambari	ST	Khowai	39,901	Tripura East
27	Kalyanpur–Pramodenagar	None	Khowai	44,773	Tripura East
28	Teliamura	None	Khowai	45,226	Tripura East
29	Krishnapur	ST	Khowai	37,929	Tripura East
30	Bagma	ST	Gomati	56,768	Tripura West
31	Radhakishorpur	None	Gomati	48,532	Tripura West
32	Matarbari	None	Gomati	55,023	Tripura West
33	Kakraban–Salgarh	SC	Gomati	54,358	Tripura West
34	Rajnagar	SC	South Tripura	48,011	Tripura West
35	Belonia	None	South Tripura	44,741	Tripura West
36	Santirbazar	ST	South Tripura	50,535	Tripura West
37	Hrishyamukh	None	South Tripura	47,006	Tripura East
38	Jolaibari	ST	South Tripura	49,025	Tripura East
39	Manu	ST	South Tripura	47,741	Tripura East
40	Sabroom	None	South Tripura	48,064	Tripura East
41	Ampinagar	ST	Gomati	42,135	Tripura East
42	Amarpur	None	Gomati	43,687	Tripura East
43	Karbook	ST	Gomati	40,656	Tripura East
44	Raima Valley	ST	Dhalai	53,421	Tripura East
45	Kamalpur	None	Dhalai	45,932	Tripura East
46	Surma	SC	Dhalai	48,393	Tripura East
47	Ambassa	ST	Dhalai	51,296	Tripura East
48	Karamcherra	ST	Dhalai	43,842	Tripura East
49	Chawamanu	ST	Dhalai	44,836	Tripura East
50	Pabiachhara	SC	Unakoti	49,260	Tripura East
51	Fatikroy	SC	Unakoti	44,946	Tripura East
52	Chandipur	None	Unakoti	46,705	Tripura East
53	Kailashahar	None	Unakoti	51,000	Tripura East
54	Kadamtala–Kurti	None	North Tripura	47,157	Tripura East
55	Bagbassa	None	North Tripura	47,295	Tripura East
56	Dharmanagar	None	North Tripura	44,745	Tripura East
57	Jubarajnagar	None	North Tripura	44,547	Tripura East
58	Panisagar	None	North Tripura	44,601	Tripura East
59	Pencharthal	ST	North Tripura	45,670	Tripura East
60	Kanchanpur	ST	North Tripura	50,748	Tripura East

== See also ==
- State legislative assemblies of India
- Tripura Legislative Assembly
