= Usha Ranjan Sen =

Indian politician (1923–2002)

- Born: 1 January 1923
- Died: 12 July 2002 (aged 79); Udaipur, Tripura
- Citizenship: Indian
- Known for: Political Contribution to the Landscape of Tripura
- Political party: Indian National Congress

Usha Ranjan Sen (1 January 1923 – 12 July 2002) was an Indian politician and was a Member of the Legislative Assembly who significantly contributed to the political landscape of Tripura. He served as the Deputy Speaker in the 3rd Assembly of Tripura from 29 March 1972, to 4 November 1977. A member of the Indian National Congress, he represented the Radhakishorepur constituency.

== Political career ==
In the 1972 Tripura Legislative Assembly election, Usha Ranjan Sen stood as a candidate from the Indian National Congress in the Radhakishorepur constituency. He won the election by a margin of 4,888 votes, defeating his opponent Sushil Mukerjee. This victory marked a significant milestone in his political career. During his tenure from 29 March 1972, to 4 November 1977, Sen served as the Deputy Speaker of the 3rd Assembly of Tripura.

== Legacy ==
Usha Ranjan Sen's contributions to the political and legal fields in Tripura are remembered for their impact on the state's development and governance. His tenure as Deputy Speaker is particularly noted for the significant role he played in the legislative assembly.
