= Ministry of Health & Family Welfare (Tripura) =

Department overview
- Jurisdiction: Government of Tripura
- Headquarters: Agartala
- Minister responsible: Manik Saha, Minister in Charge
- Website: https://health.tripura.gov.in

Ministry of Health & Family Welfare is a government ministry of the Indian state of Tripura. It is responsible for public health, medical services, family welfare, and the management of healthcare institutions across the state.
