= 2013 Tripura Legislative Assembly election =

Indian state assembly election

- 14 February 2013

All 60 seats in the Tripura Legislative Assembly 31 seats needed for a majority
- Turnout: 93.57% (▲2.35 pp)
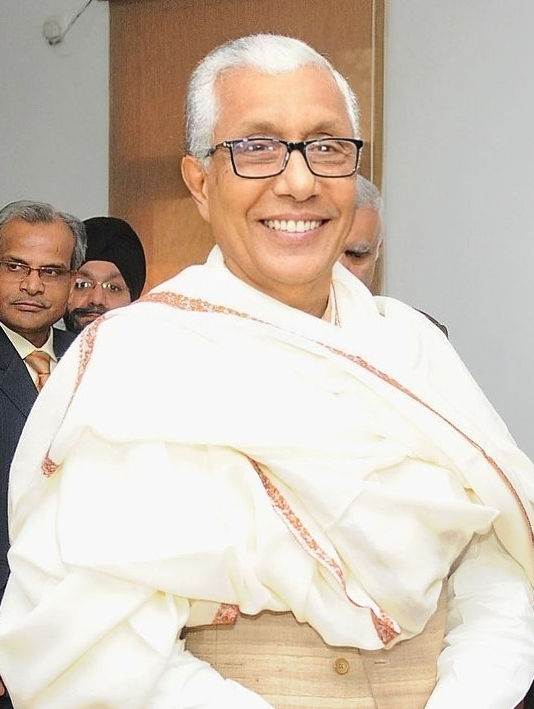

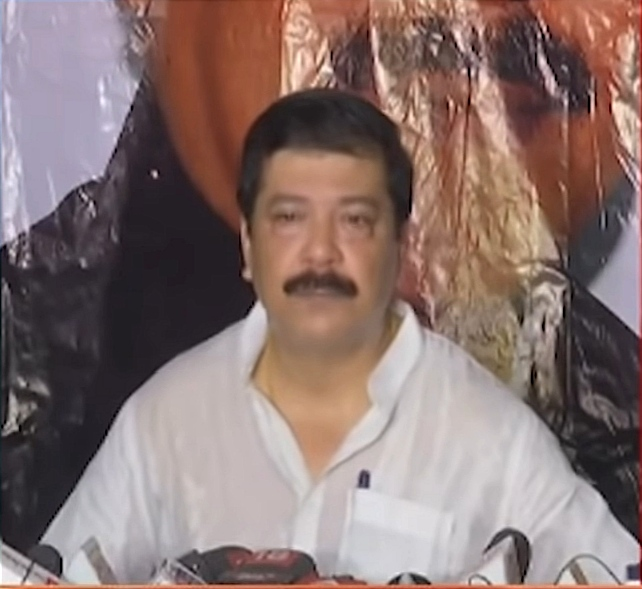
| | First party | Second party |
|---|---|---|
| Leader | Manik Sarkar | Sudip Roy Barman |
| Party | CPI(M) | INC |
| Alliance | LF | UPA |
| Leader since | 1998 | 2013 |
| Leader's seat | Dhanpur | Agartala |
| Last election | 48.01%, 46 seats | 36.38%, 10 seats |
| Seats won | 49 | 10 |
| Seat change | ▲3 | Steady |
| Popular vote | 1,059,327 | 804,457 |
| Percentage | 48.11% | 36.53% |
| Swing | ▲0.1 pp | ▼0.15 pp |
- Seatwise map of the election results

- Structure of the Tripura Legislative Assembly after the election
Chief Minister before election
Manik Sarkar
CPI(M)
Elected Chief Minister
Manik Sarkar
CPI(M)

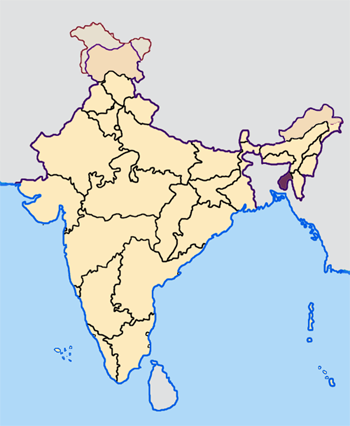
Tripura

The 2013 Tripura Legislative Assembly election took place in a single phase on 14 February to elect the Members of the Legislative Assembly (MLA) from each of the 60 Assembly Constituencies (ACs) in Tripura, India.

== Contesting parties ==
249 candidates registered to contest the election.

| Party | Symbol | Alliance | Seats contested |
|---|---|---|---|
| Communist Party of India (Marxist) (CPI(M)) | | Left Front | 55 |
| Communist Party of India (CPI) | | Left Front | 2 |
| Revolutionary Socialist Party (RSP) | | Left Front | 2 |
| All India Forward Bloc (AIFB) | | Left Front | 1 |
| Indian National Congress (INC) | | UPA | 48 |
| Bharatiya Janata Party (BJP) | | NDA | 50 |
| Independents (IND) | | | 23 |
| Amra Bangali | | | 16 |
| Indigenous Peoples Front of Tripura (IPFT) | | | 17 |
| Indigenous Nationalist Party of Twipra (INPT) | | | 12 |
| Communist Party of India (Marxist–Leninist) Liberation | | | 10 |
| Socialist Unity Centre of India (Communist) | | | 6 |
| Samajwadi Party | | | 4 |
| Nationalist Congress Party | | | 2 |
| Janata Dal (United) | | | 1 |
| Total | | | 249 |

== Highlights ==
The Tripura Legislative Assembly election was held in a single phase, on 14 February 2013, for all the 60 assembly constituencies.

=== Participating Political Parties ===
| Num | Partytype Abbreviation | Party |
|---|---|---|
National Parties
| 1 | BJP | Bharatiya Janata Party |
| 2 | CPI | Communist Party of India |
| 3 | CPM | Communist Party of India (Marxist) |
| 4 | INC | Indian National Congress |
| 5 | NCP | Nationalist Congress Party |
State Parties - Other States
| 6 | AIFB | All India Forward Bloc |
| 7 | JD(U) | Janata Dal (United) |
| 8 | RSP | Revolutionary Socialist Party |
| 9 | SP | Samajwadi Party |
Registered (Unrecognised) Parties
| 10 | AMB | Amra Bangalee |
| 11 | CPI(ML)(L) | Communist Party of India (Marxist-Leninist) (Liberation) |
| 12 | INPT | Indigenous Nationalist Party of Twipra |
| 13 | IPFT | Indigenous People's Front of Tripura |
| 14 | SUCI | Socialist Unity Centre of India (Communist) |
Independents
| 15 | IND | Independent |

=== No. of Constituencies ===
| Type of Constituencies | GEN | SC | ST | Total |
|---|---|---|---|---|
| No. of Constituencies | 30 | 10 | 20 | 60 |

=== Electors ===
| | Men | Women | Total |
|---|---|---|---|
| No.of Electors | 1,201,209 | 1,157,284 | 2,358,493 |
| No.of Electors who Voted | 1,089,860 | 1,075,622 | 2,165,482 |
| Polling Percentage | 90.73% | 92.94% | 91.82% |

=== Performance of Women Candidates ===
| | Men | Women | Total |
|---|---|---|---|
| No.of Contestants | 234 | 15 | 249 |
| Elected | 55 | 05 | 60 |

== Background ==
The previous elections to the 10th Tripura Legislative Assembly was held in 2008. As of 2009, of the 60 ACs in Tripura, 20 are reserved for Scheduled Tribes and 10 are reserved for Scheduled Castes. February 2013 Elections in all polling stations were held using Electronic voting machines.

The Left Front, led by Communist Party of India (Marxist), and headed by Manik Sarkar, had formed the Government in the 10th Tripura Assembly after being re-elected in 2008. The Left Front had won 46 of the 60 seats in 2008 election.

== Campaign ==
The 2013 elections saw the Left Front trying to retain power for a fifth consecutive term. A total of 249 candidates from different political parties contested this election.

=== Election Day ===
Election Day (14 February 2013) was overall peaceful and passed without any major incident of violence in this state that has traditionally faced insurgency from militant outfits.

According to the report by Times of India, the chief election officer of the state told that the voter turnout across the state was 93.57%, which set the record for the country's highest-ever voter turnout. This beats the previous record at 91.22 which was also set by Tripura in its 2008 assembly election. Women voters outnumbered men voters by 2.13 percent. There was 3,041 polling stations, and 18,000 poll officials were on duty.

== Results ==
=== Results by alliance and party ===
Summary of the 14 February 2013 Tripura Legislative Assembly election results
| Parties and coalitions | Popular vote | | | Seats | |
| Parties and coalitions | Votes | % | ±pp | Won | +/− |
|---|---|---|---|---|---|
| Communist Party of India (Marxist) (CPM) | 1,059,327 | 48.11 | ▲0.10 | 49 | ▲3 |
| Communist Party of India (CPI) | 34,500 | 1.57 | ▲0.09 | 1 | Steady |
| Revolutionary Socialist Party (RSP) | 31,717 | 1.95 | ▲0.26 | 0 | ▼2 |
| All India Forward Bloc (AIFB) | 15,414 | 0.70 | | 0 | |
| Total | 1,140,958 | 52.33 | ▲0.99 | 50 | ▲1 |
| Indian National Congress (INC) | 804,457 | 36.53 | ▲0.15 | 10 | Steady |
| Indigenous Nationalist Party of Twipra (INPT) | 167,078 | 7.59 | ▲1.38 | 0 | ▼1 |
| Bharatiya Janata Party (BJP) | 33,808 | 1.54 | ▲0.05 | 0 | Steady |
| Independents (IND) | 21,126 | 0.96 | ▼2.28 | 0 | Steady |
| Others | 50,052 | 1.75 | ▲0.25 | 0 | Steady |
| Total | 2,202,065 | 100.00 | | 60 | ±0 |

=== Results by District ===
| District | Total | | | |
| District | Total | CPM | CPI | INC |
| West Tripura | 14 | 8 | —N/a | 6 |
| Sipahijala | 9 | 9 | —N/a | —N/a |
| Khowai | 6 | 6 | —N/a | —N/a |
| Gomati | 7 | 6 | —N/a | 1 |
| South Tripura | 7 | 6 | 1 | —N/a |
| Dhalai | 6 | 5 | —N/a | 1 |
| Unakoti | 4 | 3 | —N/a | 1 |
| North Tripura | 7 | 6 | —N/a | 1 |
| Total | 60 | 49 | 1 | 10 |

=== Results by constituency ===
Winner, runner-up, voter turnout, and victory margin in every constituency
| Assembly Constituency | | Turnout | Winner | | | | Runner Up | | | | Margin |
| #k | Names | | Candidate | Party | Votes | | Candidate | Party | Votes | | Margin |
|---|---|---|---|---|---|---|---|---|---|---|---|
| 1 | Simna | 93.65 | Pranab Debbarma | CPI(M) | 17,063 | 54.36 | Rabindra Debbarma | INPT | 13,244 | 42.19 | 3,819 |
| 2 | Mohanpur | 94.8 | Ratan Lal Nath | INC | 19,143 | 49.12 | Subhas Chandra Debnath | CPI(M) | 18,368 | 47.13 | 775 |
| 3 | Bamutia | 95.61 | Haricharan Sarkar | CPI(M) | 19,744 | 52.35 | Prakash Chandra Das | INC | 16,994 | 45.06 | 2,750 |
| 4 | Barjala | 94.64 | Jitendra Sarkar | INC | 17,728 | 49.25 | Jitendra Das | CPI(M) | 17,467 | 48.52 | 261 |
| 5 | Khayerpur | 95.37 | Pabitra Kar | CPI(M) | 20,972 | 50.72 | Baptu Chakraborty | INC | 19,675 | 47.59 | 1,297 |
| 6 | Agartala | 92.14 | Sudip Roy Barman | INC | 22,160 | 52.29 | Sankar Prasad Datta | CPI(M) | 19,398 | 45.77 | 2,762 |
| 7 | Ramnagar | 89.85 | Ratan Das | CPI(M) | 18,060 | 49.19 | Surajit Datta | INC | 17,995 | 49.02 | 65 |
| 8 | Town Bordowali | 86.86 | Ashish Kumar Saha | INC | 22,474 | 57.45 | Shyamal Roy | AIFB | 15,414 | 39.41 | 7,060 |
| 9 | Banamalipur | 86.78 | Gopal Chandra Roy | INC | 19,464 | 57.28 | Yudhisthir Das | CPI | 13,702 | 40.32 | 5,762 |
| 10 | Majlishpur | 96.36 | Manik Dey | CPI(M) | 21,304 | 52.43 | Bibekananda Chowdhury | INC | 18,375 | 45.22 | 2,929 |
| 11 | Mandaibazar | 93.06 | Manoranjan Debbarma | CPI(M) | 19,275 | 50.35 | Jagadish Debbarma | INPT | 17,450 | 45.58 | 1,825 |
| 12 | Takarjala | 91.91 | Niranjan Debbarma | CPI(M) | 17,315 | 49.87 | Rajeshwar Debbarma | INPT | 16,108 | 46.4 | 1,207 |
| 13 | Pratapgarh | 22.82 | Anil Sarkar | CPI(M) | 23,977 | 51.38 | Ranjit Kumar Das | INC | 21,845 | 46.81 | 2,132 |
| 14 | Badharghat | 93.7 | Dilip Sarkar | INC | 24,309 | 49.29 | Samar Das | RSP | 23,666 | 47.98 | 643 |
| 15 | Kamalasagar | 94.76 | Narayan Chandra Chowdhury | CPI(M) | 19,808 | 56.13 | Dipak Kumar Roy | INC | 14,393 | 40.79 | 5,415 |
| 16 | Bishalgarh | 95.73 | Bhanu Lal Saha | CPI(M) | 20,987 | 51.02 | Samir Ranjan Barman | INC | 19,263 | 46.83 | 1,724 |
| 17 | Golaghati | 94.08 | Kesab Debbarma | CPI(M) | 19,181 | 55.55 | Manab Debbarma | INPT | 14,648 | 42.42 | 4,533 |
| 18 | Suryamaninagar | 95.62 | Rajkumar Chowdhury | CPI(M) | 21,613 | 50.47 | Avijit Deb | INC | 19,979 | 46.66 | 1,634 |
| 19 | Charilam | 93.8 | Ramendra Narayan Debbarma | CPI(M) | 16,479 | 50.94 | Himani Debbarma | INC | 15,138 | 46.79 | 1,341 |
| 20 | Boxanagar | 96.3 | Sahid Chowdhury | CPI(M) | 17,100 | 53.21 | Billal Miah | INC | 14,579 | 45.36 | 2,521 |
| 21 | Nalchar | 96.46 | Tapan Chandra Das | CPI(M) | 21,969 | 59.96 | Uttam Das | INC | 13,862 | 37.83 | 8,107 |
| 22 | Sonamura | 95.13 | Shyamal Chakraborty | CPI(M) | 18,043 | 52.21 | Subal Bhowmik | INC | 16,517 | 47.79 | 1,526 |
| 23 | Dhanpur | 96.07 | Manik Sarkar | CPI(M) | 21,286 | 57.1 | Shah Alam | INC | 15,269 | 40.96 | 6,017 |
| 24 | Ramchandraghat | 93.07 | Padma Kumar Debbarma | CPI(M) | 19,504 | 59.15 | Animesh Debbarma | IND | 11,613 | 35.22 | 7,891 |
| 25 | Khowai | 96.17 | Samir Deb Sarkar | CPI(M) | 22,692 | 60.82 | Dipak Majumder | INC | 13,859 | 37.15 | 8,833 |
| 26 | Asharambari | 92.92 | Aghore Debbarma | CPI(M) | 17,826 | 59.55 | Amiya Kumar Debbarma | INPT | 10,609 | 35.44 | 7,217 |
| 27 | Kalyanpur–Pramodenagar | 93.87 | Manindra Chandra Das | CPI(M) | 19,755 | 53.78 | Kajal Chandra Das | INC | 15,975 | 43.49 | 3,780 |
| 28 | Teliamura | 93.51 | Gouri Das | CPI(M) | 18,357 | 50.2 | Gourisankar Roy | INC | 17,044 | 46.61 | 1,313 |
| 29 | Krishnapur | 93.75 | Khagendra Jamatia | CPI(M) | 17,125 | 58.32 | Sabda Kumar Jamatia | INC | 11,083 | 37.74 | 6,042 |
| 30 | Bagma | 95.04 | Naresh Chandra Jamatia | CPI(M) | 23,600 | 53.49 | Jyotish Jamatia | INPT | 19,525 | 44.25 | 4,075 |
| 31 | Radhakishorpur | 94.7 | Pranjit Singha Roy | INC | 20,140 | 50.23 | Joy Gobinda Deb Roy | RSP | 19,303 | 48.15 | 837 |
| 32 | Matarbari | 95.78 | Madhab Chandra Saha | CPI(M) | 22,178 | 50.09 | Biplab Kumar Ghosh | INC | 20,868 | 47.13 | 1,310 |
| 33 | Kakraban–Salgarh | 94.98 | Ratan Kumar Bhowmik | CPI(M) | 24,947 | 57.07 | Rajib Samaddar | INC | 17,757 | 40.62 | 7,190 |
| 34 | Rajnagar | 95.1 | Sudhan Das | CPI(M) | 23,942 | 63.61 | Manik Chandra Das | INC | 12,545 | 33.33 | 11,397 |
| 35 | Belonia | 95.73 | Basudev Majumder | CPI(M) | 20,585 | 55.6 | Amal Mallik | INC | 15,761 | 42.57 | 4,824 |
| 36 | Santirbazar | 94.88 | Manindra Reang | CPI | 20,798 | 52.87 | Gouri Sankar Reang | INC | 17,042 | 43.32 | 3,756 |
| 37 | Hrishyamukh | 96.22 | Badal Chowdhury | CPI(M) | 25,009 | 65.42 | Susankar Bhowmik | INC | 12,580 | 32.91 | 12,429 |
| 38 | Jolaibari | 95.31 | Jashabir Tripura | CPI(M) | 24,295 | 61.9 | Brajendra Mog Chowdhury | INC | 14,952 | 38.1 | 9,343 |
| 39 | Manu | 96.01 | Jitendra Chaudhury | CPI(M) | 21,320 | 58.07 | Chandi Charan Tripura | INC | 14,424 | 39.29 | 6,896 |
| 40 | Sabroom | 95.68 | Rita Kar (Majumder) | CPI(M) | 21,404 | 55.87 | Premtosh Nath | INC | 16,197 | 42.28 | 5,207 |
| 41 | Ampinagar | 93.06 | Daniel Jamatia | CPI(M) | 15,714 | 52.69 | Nagendra Jamatia | INPT | 12,930 | 43.36 | 2,784 |
| 42 | Amarpur | 95.7 | Manoranjan Acharjee | CPI(M) | 19,075 | 54.72 | Niranjan Barman | INC | 15,053 | 43.18 | 4,022 |
| 43 | Karbook | 94.17 | Priyamani Debbarma | CPI(M) | 15,526 | 53.4 | Dharjaroy Tripura | INPT | 12,091 | 41.59 | 3,435 |
| 44 | Raima Valley | 92.51 | Lalit Mohan Tripura | CPI(M) | 18,527 | 51.99 | Nakshatra Jamatia | INPT | 15,651 | 43.92 | 2,876 |
| 45 | Kamalpur | 92.72 | Bijoy Lakshmi Singha | CPI(M) | 19,204 | 51.15 | Manoj Kanti Deb | INC | 17,690 | 47.12 | 1,514 |
| 46 | Surma | 92.66 | Sudhir Das | CPI(M) | 18,648 | 50.51 | Sukha Ranjan Das | INC | 16,786 | 45.47 | 1,862 |
| 47 | Ambassa | 92.82 | Lalit Kumar Debbarma | CPI(M) | 18,755 | 49.11 | Bijoy Kumar Hrangkhawl | INPT | 17,701 | 46.35 | 1,054 |
| 48 | Karamcherra | 91.1 | Diba Chandra Hrangkhawl | INC | 15,411 | 49.77 | Gajendra Tripura | CPI(M) | 14,039 | 45.34 | 1,372 |
| 49 | Chawamanu | 89.96 | Nirajoy Tripura | CPI(M) | 15,870 | 50.8 | Zaidami Tripura | INC | 14,375 | 46.01 | 1,495 |
| 50 | Pabiachhara | 92.74 | Samiran Malakar | CPI(M) | 18,504 | 49.81 | Satyaban Das | INC | 17,254 | 46.44 | 1,250 |
| 51 | Fatikroy | 92.52 | Tunubala Malakar | CPI(M) | 17,899 | 51.18 | Jugal Malakar | INC | 16,034 | 45.84 | 1,865 |
| 52 | Chandipur | 91.92 | Tapan Chakraborty | CPI(M) | 21,009 | 58.43 | Nirmalendu Deb | INC | 13,380 | 37.21 | 7,629 |
| 53 | Kailashahar | 91.27 | Birajit Sinha | INC | 18,857 | 49.55 | Moboshar Ali | CPI(M) | 18,372 | 48.28 | 485 |
| 54 | Kadamtala–Kurti | 91.22 | Fayzur Rahaman | CPI(M) | 14,514 | 42.64 | Abdul Matin Chowdhury | INC | 12,585 | 36.98 | 1,929 |
| 55 | Bagbassa | 90.53 | Bijita Nath | CPI(M) | 17,991 | 51.26 | Jyotirmoy Nath | INC | 15,059 | 42.91 | 2,932 |
| 56 | Dharmanagar | 91.45 | Biswa Bandhu Sen | INC | 17,991 | 50.99 | Amitabha Datta | CPI(M) | 16,147 | 45.77 | 1,844 |
| 57 | Jubarajnagar | 94. | Ramendra Chandra Debnath | CPI(M) | 18,602 | 53.19 | Ranadhir Nath | INC | 15,724 | 44.96 | 2,878 |
| 58 | Panisagar | 92.13 | Subodh Chandra Das | CPI(M) | 15,196 | 51.45 | Radhika Ranjan Das | INC | 13,285 | 44.98 | 1,911 |
| 59 | Pencharthal | 91.41 | Arun Kumar Chakma | CPI(M) | 16,601 | 50.46 | Purnita Chakma | INC | 15,584 | 47.36 | 1,017 |
| 60 | Kanchanpur | 90.59 | Rajendra Reang (Tripura politician) | CPI(M) | 17,186 | 50.13 | Drao Kumar Reang | INPT | 16,105 | 46.98 | 1,081 |
