= Government of Tripura =

Indian State Government

- Seat of Government: Agartala

Legislative branch
- Assembly: Tripura Legislative Assembly
- Speaker: Ram Pada Jamatia
- Deputy Speaker: Ram Prasad Paul
- Members in Assembly: 60

Executive branch
- Governor: N. Indrasena Reddy
- Chief Minister: Manik Saha
- Deputy Chief Minister: Vacant
- Chief Secretary: Shri Jitendra Kumar Sinha, IAS

Judiciary
- High Court: Tripura High Court
- Chief Justice: Justice M. S. Ramachandra Rao

The Government of Tripura, also known as the State Government of Tripura, or locally as State Government, is the supreme governing authority of the Indian state of Tripura and its 8 districts. It consists of an executive, led by the Governor of Tripura, a judiciary and a legislative branch.

Like other states in India, the head of state of Tripura is the Governor, appointed by the President of India on the advice of the Central government. The post of governor is largely ceremonial. The Chief Minister is the head of government and is vested with most of the executive powers. Agartala is the capital of Tripura, and houses the Vidhan Sabha (Legislative Assembly) and the secretariat. The Tripura High Court, located in Agartala, Tripura exercises the jurisdiction and powers in respect of cases arising in the State of Tripura.

The present Legislative Assembly of Tripura is unicameral, consisting of 60 Member of the Legislative Assembly (M.L.A). Its term is 5 years, unless sooner dissolved.

Training for staff working for the State Government and other bodies delivering public services such as NGOs is provided by the State Institute of Public Administration and Rural Development - an autonomous body whose executive team comprises senior officials of the State Government.

== Cabinet ==
- As in March 2023

S.No	Name	Constituency	Department	Took office	Left office	Party
Chief Minister
1.	Manik Saha	Town Bordowali	Home; Health & Family Welfare; PWD; Other departments not allocated to any Minister.	8 March 2023	Incumbent	BJP
Cabinet Ministers
2.	Ratan Lal Nath	Mohanpur	Power; Agriculture & Farmers' Welfare; Law (Parliamentary Affairs); Election	10 March 2023	Incumbent	BJP
3.	Pranjit Singha Roy	Radhakishorpur	Finance; Planning and Coordination; Information Technology	10 March 2023	Incumbent	BJP
4.	Santana Chakma	Pencharthal	Industries and commerce; Jail(Home); Welfare of OBCs	10 March 2023	Incumbent	BJP
5.	Sushanta Chowdhury	Majlishpur	Food, Civil Supplies & Consumer Affairs; Transport; Tourism	10 March 2023	Incumbent	BJP
6.	Tinku Roy	Chandipur	Youth Affairs & Sports; Social Welfare & Social Education; Labour	10 March 2023	Incumbent	BJP
7.	Bikash Debbarma	Krishnapur	Tribal Welfare; Handloom, Handicrafts & Sericulture; Statistics	10 March 2023	Incumbent	BJP
8.	Sudhangshu Das	Fatikroy	Welfare of Schedule castes; Animal Resource development; Fisheries	10 March 2023	Incumbent	BJP
9.	Sukla Charan Noatia	Jolaibari	Cooperation; Tribal Welfare(TRP & PTG); Welfare of Minorities	10 March 2023	Incumbent	IPFT
10.	Animesh Debbarma	Ashrambari	Forests; General Administration (Printing & Stationery); Science, Technology, and Environment	7 March 2024	Incumbent	TMP
11.	Kishor Barman	Nalchar	Higher Education; General Administration (Political); Panchayat	3 July 2025	Incumbent	BJP
Minister of State
1.	Brishaketu Debbarma	Simna	Industries & Commerce(Minister of State)	7 March 2024	Incumbent	TMP

== Demography of Council of Ministers ==
District	Ministers	Name of ministers
Dhalai	0	-
Gomati	1	Pranjit Singha Roy
Khowai	2	Animesh Debbarma; Bikash Debbarma
Sipahijala	1	Kishor Barman
Unakoti	2	Sudhangshu Das; Tinku Roy
North Tripura	1	Santana Chakma
South Tripura	1	Sukla Charan Noatia
West Tripura	4	Brishaketu Debbarma; Manik Saha; Ratan Lal Nath; Sushanta Chowdhury
