= Sukla Charan Noatia =

Indian politician

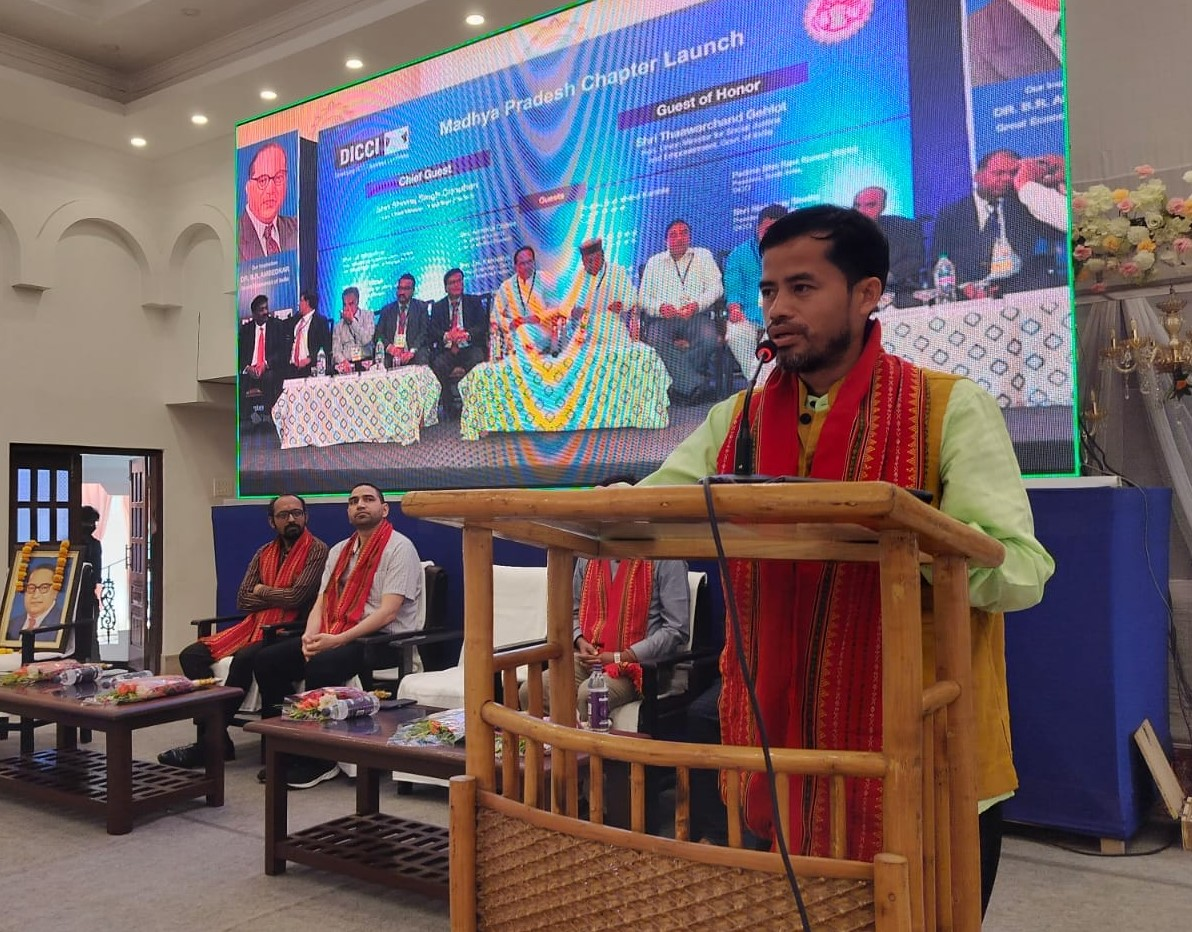

Minister of Cooperation, Tribal Welfare (TRP & PTG) and Welfare of Minorities
- Incumbent
- Assumed office 2023

Member of the Tripura Legislative Assembly
- Incumbent
- Assumed office 2023
- Constituency: Jolaibari

Personal details
- Citizenship: India
- Party: IPFT
- Parent: Rashmani Noatia
- Education: 12th pass
- Cabinet: State Government of Tripura

Sukla Charan Noatia is an Indian politician from Tripura. He is the Minister of Cooperation, Tribal Welfare (TRP & PTG), and Welfare of Minorities in the Government of Tripura as part of the Second Saha Ministry. He became the MLA from the Jolaibari Assembly constituency by defeating Debendra Tripura of Communist Party of India (Marxist) by a margin of 375 votes in 2023.
