= Sudhangshu Das =

Indian politician

Minister of Welfare of Scheduled Castes, Animal Resource Development, Fisherie Government of Tripura
- Incumbent
- Assumed office 10 March 2023
- Chief Minister: Manik Saha

Member of the Tripura Legislative Assembly
- Incumbent
- Assumed office 2018
- Preceded by: Tunubala Malakar
- Constituency: Fatikroy

Personal details
- Born: 12 May 1988 (age 37) Kailashahar, Unakoti district
- Party: Bharatiya Janata Party
- Parent: Indubhushan Das
- Education: B.A (Hons)
- Alma mater: Ramkrishna Mahavidyalaya
- Profession: Politician, Social Work

Sudhangshu Das (born 12 May 1988) is an Indian politician from Tripura. He is the Minister of Welfare of Scheduled Castes, Animal Resource Development, Fisheries in the second Manik Saha Ministry. He was first elected from the Fatikroy constituency in the Tripura Legislative Assembly in 2018.
