= State Institute of Public Administration and Rural Development =

Public policy institute in Agartala, India

- Established: 1993
- Location: Agartala, Tripura, India
- Website: https://sipard.tripura.gov.in/

The State Institute of Public Administration and Rural Development (SIPARD) is a training institute dedicated to public administration and rural development in Indian state of Tripura. The institute was established in the year 1993 by the Government of India. The name of the institute varies to Panchayati Raj Training Institute, Regional Survey Training Institute, Cooperative Training Institute and more in different states in India.

== Programmes ==
The institute provides training programmes to the State government officials, representatives of PRIs and to the various members of non-governmental organizations (NGOs).
