= Sushanta Chowdhury =

Indian politician

Minister of Food, Civil Supplies and Consumer Affairs, Transport and Tourism
- Incumbent
- Assumed office 2023

Member of the Tripura Legislative Assembly
- Incumbent
- Assumed office 2018
- Preceded by: Manik Dey
- Constituency: Majlishpur

Personal details
- Born: 25 August 1979 (age 46)
- Citizenship: India
- Party: Bharatiya Janata Party (BJP)
- Parent: Shyamal Chowdhury
- Education: Post graduate
- Alma mater: Gauhati University
- Cabinet: State Government of Tripura

Sushanta Chowdhury (born 25 August 1979) is an Indian politician from Tripura. He is currently serving as Minister of Food, Civil Supplies and Consumer Affairs, Transport and Tourism in the Government of Tripura under the Second Saha Ministry. He became the MLA from the Majlishpur Constituency by defeating CPI(M) candidate Manik Dey by a margin of 3,890 votes in 2018.

== Criminal Case ==
- In July 2011, charges were pressed against Sushanta for attempt to murder, voluntarily causing grievous hurt by dangerous weapons or means, assault or criminal force to deter public servant from discharge of his duty and the like under IPC sections 148, 149, 326, 333, 353, 307 and 427.
- Again, in February 2016, Sushanta was charged under IPC section 188 for disobedience to order duly promulgated by a public servant.

== Controversies ==
- In November 2021, Tripura information and cultural affairs minister Sushanta Chowdhury claimed that two HW News Network journalists named Samriddhi Sakunia and Swarna Jha, who visited the state to cover reported incidents of violence against minorities, were agents of a political party and that they aimed to incite communal disturbances in the state.
- The minister further alleged Sakunia and Jha were persuading people against the ruling Bharatiya Janata Party (BJP) and its ministers in the state by disguising as salesmen and posting fake photos and footages.
- After the gang-rape of a child in Tripura, minister Sushanta Chowdhury backed the accuser, a minister's son.
