= Department of Tribal Welfare (Tripura) =

Department in Government of Tripura

Agency overview
- Formed: 24 October 1970
- Jurisdiction: Tripura
- Headquarters: Agartala
- Minister responsible: Bikash Debbarma, Minister for Tribal Welfare
- Agency executive: Brijesh Pandey, IAS, Secretary to the Government
- Website: Department of Tribal Welfare

The Department of Tribal Welfare (Tripura) is one of the departments of Government of Tripura. The department is responsible for enacting and implementing various policies for the welfare of scheduled tribes in the state.

== See also ==
- Tripura Government Departments
- Ministry of Tribal Affairs
