= Tinku Roy =

Indian politician

Youth Affairs & Sports, Social Welfare & Social Education and Labour
- Incumbent
- Assumed office 2023

Member of the Tripura Legislative Assembly
- Incumbent
- Assumed office 2023
- Preceded by: Tapan Chakraborty
- Constituency: Chandipur

Personal details
- Born: 1975 (age 50–51)
- Citizenship: India
- Party: Bharatiya Janata Party (BJP)
- Parent: Manoranjan Roy
- Education: Higher Secondary
- Cabinet: State Government of Tripura

Tinku Roy (born 1 January 1975) is an Indian Politician from Tripura. He is currently serving as Minister of Youth Affairs & Sports, Social Welfare & Social Education and Labour in the Government of Tripura under the Second Saha Ministry. He was elected as a member of Tripura Legislative Assembly from Chandipur in 2023.
