= Sukumar Barman =

Indian politician

Assembly Member for Nalchar

Personal details
- Born: 1 January 1952 Kemtali
- Died: 10 March 2012 (aged 60) Agartala
- Party: Communist Party of India (Marxist)
- Other political affiliations: General secretary of the Tripura Scheduled Caste Coordination Committee

Sukumar Barman (1 January 1952, in Kemtali – 10 March 2012, in Agartala) was an Indian politician. He was a prominent leader of the Scheduled Castes in Tripura.

Barman hailed from an impoverished fishing family in Sonamura district. His family sent him to live with an uncle in order to attend school, and he first came into contact with activist politics through the student movement. He completed his higher secondary examination in 1971. He went on to join the peasants' movement.

Barman became a member of the Communist Party of India (Marxist) in 1976. Between 1978 and 1983, he served as elected village pradhan of Kemtali. He then became a member of the Tripura State Committee of the party. He also became the general secretary of the Tripura Scheduled Caste Coordination Committee.

From 1988 onwards he was a member of the Tripura Legislative Assembly, representing the Nalchar constituency. During the Indian National Congress/Tripura Upajati Juba Samiti government of 1988–1993, Barman was the target of several assassination attempts.

When the Left Front returned to government in Tripura in 1993, Barman was named Minister of State. Between 1998 and 2004 he served as the Tripura Minister of Transport and Fisheries. He lost his cabinet position after the downsizing of the government that resulted from The Constitution (91st Amendment) Act 2003.

Barman served as the chairman of the state owned land development bank and Tripura Road Transport Corporation. He was also a well known swimmer.

Barman died in March 2012 at G.B. Pant hospital in Agartala, where he had been admitted following a brain haemorrhage. The state government declared a two-day mourning period, during which the national flag was flown at half mast. His body was cremated in Kemtali.
