= Department of Higher Education (Tripura) =

Government department in Tripura, India

Agency overview
- Formed: 1947; 79 years ago
- Jurisdiction: Tripura
- Headquarters: Agartala
- Minister responsible: Kishor Barman, Minister for Higher Education Department
- Agency executive: Raval H. Kumar, Special Secretary to Government
- Parent agency: Government of Tripura
- Website: Higher Education Department

The Department of Higher Education is an administrative department under the Government of Tripura responsible for formulating policies, implementing programmes, and managing institutions related to higher education in the state. The department is responsible for hiring and employing teaching staffs in positions of Professor, Associate Professor and Assistant Professor as well as non-teaching staff in Higher Education Institutions running under Government of Tripura.

== History ==
The directorate was introduced in 1947 with the establishment of Maharaja Bir Bikram College in Agartala.

== Objective ==
The department is responsible for formulating policies, laws, regulations and programmes for higher education in the state.

== See also ==
- Education in Tripura
- Department of Higher Education (India)
- Government of Tripura
