= Bikash Debbarma =

Indian politician

Minister of Tribal Welfare and Handloom, Handicrafts and Sericulture and Statistics
- Incumbent
- Assumed office 2023
- Preceded by: Ram Pada Jamatia

Member of the Tripura Legislative Assembly
- Incumbent
- Assumed office 2023
- Preceded by: Atul Debbarma
- Constituency: Krishnapur

Personal details
- Citizenship: India
- Party: Bharatiya Janata Party (BJP)
- Parent: Suresh Debbarma
- Cabinet: State Government of Tripura

Bikash Debbarma is an Indian politician from Tripura. He serves as Minister of Tribal Welfare, Handloom, Handicrafts and Sericulture and Statistics in Government of Tripura under the Second Saha Ministry.

== Political career ==
He became the MLA from the Krishnapur Assembly constituency, defeating Mahendra Debbarma of the Tipra Motha Party by a margin of 2,638 votes in 2023. He was also president of the BJP's Janajati Morcha in Tripura.
