= Bagbassa Assembly constituency =

Legislative Assembly constituency in Tripura State, India

Coordinates: 24.35°N 92.24°E

Bagbassa
- Constituency No. 55 for the Tripura Legislative Assembly

Constituency details
- Country: India
- Region: Northeast India
- State: Tripura
- District: North Tripura
- Lok Sabha constituency: Tripura East
- Established: 2008
- Total electors: 47,295
- Reservation: None

Member of Legislative Assembly
- 13th Tripura Legislative Assembly
- Incumbent Jadab Lal Debnath
- Party: Bharatiya Janata Party
- Elected year: 2023

Bagbassa Legislative Assembly constituency is one of the 60 Legislative Assembly constituencies of Tripura state in India.

It comprises Kameshwar tehsil, Sanichhara tehsil and Hurua tehsil, along with parts of Ichailalchhara tehsil in North Tripura district.

== Members of the Legislative Assembly ==
Election	Name	Party
2013	Bijita Nath	Communist Party of India
2018	Bijita Nath	Communist Party of India
2023	Jadab Lal Debnath	Bharatiya Janata Party

== Election results ==
=== 2023 Assembly election ===
2023 Tripura Legislative Assembly election: Bagbassa
Party	Candidate	Votes	%	±%
BJP	Jadab Lal Debnath	18,905	47.41%	▲0.04
CPI(M)	Bijita Nath	17,444	43.74%	New
TMP	Kalpana Sinha	2,281	5.72%	New
AITC	Bimal Nath	731	1.83%	▲1.10
NOTA	None of the Above	517	1.30%	▲0.61
Margin of victory		1,461	3.66%	▲2.94
Turnout		39,878	84.41%	▼2.95
Registered electors		47,295		▲10.27
BJP gain from CPI(M)		Swing	▼0.69	

=== 2018 Assembly election ===
2018 Tripura Legislative Assembly election: Bagbassa
Party	Candidate	Votes	%	±%
CPI(M)	Bijita Nath	18,001	48.09%	▼3.17
BJP	Pradip Kumar Nath	17,731	47.37%	▲43.16
INC	Jyotirmoy Nath	552	1.47%	▼41.43
CPI(ML)L	Arabinda Teli	277	0.74%	▼0.87
AITC	Amarjit Singha	274	0.73%	New
NOTA	None of the Above	257	0.69%	New
Margin of victory		270	0.72%	▼7.63
Turnout		37,430	86.74%	▼3.20
Registered electors		42,889		▲10.57
CPI(M) hold		Swing	▼3.17	

=== 2013 Assembly election ===
2013 Tripura Legislative Assembly election: Bagbassa
Party	Candidate	Votes	%	±%
CPI(M)	Bijita Nath	17,991	51.26%	New
INC	Jyotirmoy Nath	15,059	42.91%	New
BJP	Ronajoy Kumar Deb	1,479	4.21%	New
CPI(ML)L	Subirjit Sinha	566	1.61%	New
Margin of victory		2,932	8.35%	
Turnout		35,095	90.53%	
Registered electors		38,790		
CPI(M) win (new seat)				

== See also ==
- List of constituencies of the Tripura Legislative Assembly
- North Tripura district
