= Kalyanpur–Pramodenagar Assembly constituency =

Legislative Assembly constituency in Tripura State, India

Coordinates: 23.93°N 91.62°E

Kalyanpur-Pramodenagar
- Constituency No. 27 for the Tripura Legislative Assembly

Constituency details
- Country: India
- Region: Northeast India
- State: Tripura
- District: Khowai
- Lok Sabha constituency: Tripura East
- Established: 2003
- Total electors: 44,773
- Reservation: None

Member of Legislative Assembly
- 13th Tripura Legislative Assembly
- Incumbent Pinaki Das Chowdhury
- Party: Bharatiya Janata Party
- Elected year: 2023

Kalyanpur-Pramodenagar is one of the 60 Legislative Assembly constituencies of Tripura state in India. It is in Khowai district and a part of East Tripura Lok Sabha constituency.

== Members of the Legislative Assembly ==
Election	Member	Party
2013	Manindra Chandra Das	Communist Party of India
2018	Pinaki Das Chowdhury	Bharatiya Janata Party
2023	Pinaki Das Chowdhury	Bharatiya Janata Party

== Election results ==
=== 2023 Assembly election ===
2023 Tripura Legislative Assembly election: Kalyanpur–Pramodenagar
Party	Candidate	Votes	%	±%
BJP	Pinaki Das Chowdhury	17,903	43.59%	▼8.42
TMP	Manihar Debbarma	11,290	27.49%	New
CPI(M)	Manindra Chandra Das	10,981	26.73%	New
Independent	Nagendra Chandra Shil	529	1.29%	New
NOTA	None of the Above	372	0.91%	▲0.07
Margin of victory		6,613	16.10%	▲8.05
Turnout		41,075	91.79%	▼0.73
Registered electors		44,773		▲6.11
BJP hold		Swing	▼8.42	

=== 2018 Assembly election ===
2018 Tripura Legislative Assembly election: Kalyanpur–Pramodenagar
Party	Candidate	Votes	%	±%
BJP	Pinaki Das Chowdhury	20,293	52.01%	▲50.93
CPI(M)	Manindra Chandra Das	17,152	43.96%	▼9.82
INC	Bikram Kishore Sinha	347	0.89%	▼42.60
AMB	Uttam Kumar Das	345	0.88%	▼0.77
NOTA	None of the Above	327	0.84%	New
Margin of victory		3,141	8.05%	▼2.24
Turnout		39,018	91.68%	▼1.31
Registered electors		42,195		▲7.72
BJP gain from CPI(M)		Swing	▼1.77	

=== 2013 Assembly election ===
2013 Tripura Legislative Assembly election: Kalyanpur–Pramodenagar
Party	Candidate	Votes	%	±%
CPI(M)	Manindra Chandra Das	19,755	53.78%	New
INC	Kajal Chandra Das	15,975	43.49%	New
AMB	Biplab Roy	609	1.66%	New
BJP	Khokan Chandra Pal	395	1.08%	New
Margin of victory		3,780	10.29%	
Turnout		36,734	93.87%	
Registered electors		39,172		
CPI(M) win (new seat)				

== See also ==
- List of constituencies of the Tripura Legislative Assembly
- Khowai district
- Tripura East (Lok Sabha constituency)
