= Kishor Barman =

Indian politician

Minister of Higher Education and Panchayat
- Incumbent
- Assumed office 3 July 2025

Member of Tripura Legislative Assembly
- Incumbent
- Assumed office 2023
- Preceded by: Subhash Chandra Das
- Constituency: Nalchar

Personal details
- Born: 1981 (age 44–45)
- Party: Bharatiya Janata Party
- Spouse: Gargi Mandal
- Education: Tripura University
- Cabinet: Government of Tripura

Kishor Barman (born 1981) is an Indian politician from Tripura. He is a member of the Tripura Legislative Assembly from the Nalchar Assembly constituency, which is reserved for Scheduled Caste community, in Sipahijala district. He won the 2023 Tripura Legislative Assembly election, representing the Bharatiya Janata Party. He was inducted into the Tripura Government cabinet on 3 July 2025.

== Early life and education ==
Barman is from Nalchar, Sipahijala district, Tripura. He is the son of Amar Chand Barman. He completed his M.A. degree in Bengali, in 2004, at Tripura University.

== Career ==
Barman won the Nalchar Assembly constituency representing the Bharatiya Janata Party in the 2023 Tripura Legislative Assembly election. He polled 20,836 votes and defeated his nearest rival, Tapan Chandra Das of the Communist Party of India (Marxist), by a margin of 2,384 votes. He also serves as the general secretary of the BJP.

On 3 July 2025, he was administered the oath as a minister by Governor N. Indrasena Reddy at Raj Bhavan in Agartala. He joined the Chief Minister Manik Saha's cabinet as its 12th member. However, Tipra Motha and the Indigenous People’s Front, the allies of the ruling BJP as well as the opposition parties CPI (M) and INC, skipped the oath-taking ceremony.
