= Santana Chakma =

Indian politician from Tripura

Santana Chakma 𑄥𑄚𑄴𑄖𑄧𑄚 𑄌𑄋𑄴𑄟𑄳𑄦

[Manik Saha ministry] Industries and commerce Jail(Home) Welfare of OBCs
- Incumbent
- Assumed office 10 March 2023
- Preceded by: Bijita Nath

Personal details
- Born: Santana Chakma Tripura, India
- Party: Bharatiya Janata Party
- Parent: Chandradhan Chakma
- Cabinet: State Government of Tripura

Santana Chakma (born c. 1985) is an Indian Politician from Tripura. She currently serves as Minister of Industries and Commerce, Jail (Home), and Welfare of OBCs in the Manik Saha cabinet. She was re-elected as the MLA from the Pencharthal constituency for the second time, defeating Tipra Motha Party candidate Hollywood Chakma by a margin of 8,137 votes.
