= Tripura Tourism Development Corporation =

Indian state tourism agency

- Company type: Government of Tripura's Public Sector Undertaking
- Industry: Tourism, Ecotourism, Hotel Management
- Founded: 3 June 2009
- Headquarters: Swetmahal, Agartala, Tripura, India
- Area served: Tripura, India
- Key people: Prashant Badal Negi, IAS (Managing Director)
- Services: Tourism sector
- Website: https://tripuratourism.gov.in/

The Tripura Tourism Development Corporation or TTDCL is a state owned corporation of Tripura, India. It deals with tourism services and development as a part of the Tripura Tourism Department along with the Directorate of Tourism and was established on 3 June 2009.

Sourav Ganguly former captain of the Indian Cricket Team is the brand ambassador of Tripura Tourism appointed by TTDCL in late 2023.

== Package tours ==
TTDCL sells 4 packaged tours of Tripura across world, through their website and network of travel agents and tour agencies who act as general sales agents of TTDCL.

== See also ==
- Tourism in Tripura
- Tourism in Northeast India
