= Tripura Forest Department =

Government of Tripura Organisation

- image has rationale=yes Logo of Tripura Forest Department

Agency overview
- Jurisdiction: Tripura
- Headquarters: Aranya Bhawan, Nehru Complex, Agartala, Tripura
- Minister responsible: Sri Animesh Debbarma, Ministry of Forest and Wildlife
- Agency executive: Dr Avinash Kanfade, IFS, Principal Chief Conservator of Forests
- Parent agency: Government of Tripura
- Website: https://forest.tripura.gov.in/

Tripura Forest Department is one of the administrative department of Government of Tripura responsible for forestry, protected areas and wildlife management in the state of Tripura, India. The Principal Chief Conservator of Forests, Head of Forest Force (HoFF) is the head of the Tripura Forest Department. The Forest Department is organised into 8 district circles and 23 divisions.

== Geographic divisions ==
The Forest Department is responsible for managing an area over 6,294 km^{2} (2,430 sq mi), 59.99% of the 10,491 km^{2} (4,051 sq mi) recorded forest area of the state.

== See also ==
- Van Vigyan Kendra
- Indian Council of Forestry Research and Education
