= Department of Finance (Tripura) =

Government department of Tripura state, India

Agency overview
- Jurisdiction: Tripura
- Headquarters: Agartala
- Minister responsible: Pranjit Singha Roy, Minister of Finance Department
- Agency executive: Apurba Roy, IAS, Secretary, Finance
- Parent agency: Government of Tripura
- Website: Finance Department

The Department of Finance is one of the departments of Government of Tripura. It is responsible for managing the public finances and presenting the budget of the state government.

== Objective ==
The department is responsible for manage state finances, including budgeting, expenditure, revenue generation, and fiscal policies, to ensure sustainable economic growth and financial stability.
