= Kadamtala–Kurti Assembly constituency =

Legislative Assembly constituency in Tripura State, India

Coordinates: 24.46°N 92.2°E

Kadamtala-Kurti
- Constituency No. 54 for the Tripura Legislative Assembly

Constituency details
- Country: India
- Region: Northeast India
- State: Tripura
- District: North Tripura
- Lok Sabha constituency: Tripura East
- Established: 2008
- Total electors: 47,157
- Reservation: None

Member of Legislative Assembly
- 13th Tripura Legislative Assembly
- Incumbent Islam Uddin
- Party: Communist Party of India (Marxist)
- Elected year: 2023

Kadamtala-Kurti Legislative Assembly constituency is one of the 60 Legislative Assembly constituencies of Tripura state in India.

It is part of North Tripura district.

== Members of the Legislative Assembly ==
Election	Member	Party
2013	Fayzur Rahaman	Communist Party of India
2018	Islam Uddin	Communist Party of India
2023	Islam Uddin	Communist Party of India

== Election results ==
=== 2023 Assembly election ===
2023 Tripura Legislative Assembly election: Kadamtala–Kurti
Party	Candidate	Votes	%	±%
CPI(M)	Islam Uddin	20,012	49.65%	New
BJP	Dilip Tanti	18,120	44.95%	▲6.99
AITC	Abdul Hasim	1,061	2.63%	▲1.64
Independent	Gopal Krishna Deb	636	1.58%	New
NOTA	None of the Above	480	1.19%	▲0.05
Margin of victory		1,892	4.69%	▼14.18
Turnout		40,309	85.53%	▼2.54
Registered electors		47,157		▲13.86
CPI(M) gain from CPI(M)		Swing	▼7.19	

=== 2018 Assembly election ===
2018 Tripura Legislative Assembly election: Kadamtala–Kurti
Party	Candidate	Votes	%	±%
CPI(M)	Islam Uddin	20,721	56.84%	▲14.20
BJP	Tinku Roy	13,839	37.96%	▲20.13
INC	Giyas Uddin Chowdhury	936	2.57%	▼34.41
NOTA	None of the Above	417	1.14%	New
AITC	Rasamay Nath	363	1.00%	New
Margin of victory		6,882	18.88%	▲13.21
Turnout		36,455	88.28%	▼3.16
Registered electors		41,416		▲10.96
CPI(M) hold		Swing	▲14.20	

=== 2013 Assembly election ===
2013 Tripura Legislative Assembly election: Kadamtala–Kurti
Party	Candidate	Votes	%	±%
CPI(M)	Fayzur Rahaman	14,514	42.64%	New
INC	Abdul Matin Chowdhury	12,585	36.98%	New
BJP	Arijit Nath	6,070	17.83%	New
JD(U)	Abdul Kayum	487	1.43%	New
CPI(ML)L	Fazlur Rahaman	379	1.11%	New
Margin of victory		1,929	5.67%	
Turnout		34,035	91.22%	
Registered electors		37,326		
CPI(M) win (new seat)				

== See also ==
- List of constituencies of the Tripura Legislative Assembly
- North Tripura district
