= Manik Dey =

Indian politician

Minister for Power, Urban Development, Rural Development and Transport
- In office 2003–2018

Member of Legislative Assembly, Tripura
- In office 1993–2018
- Preceded by: Dipak Nag
- Succeeded by: Sushanta Chowdhury
- Constituency: Majlishpur

Personal details
- Born: 18 October 1952 (age 73) Champaknagar, Tripura, India
- Party: Communist Party of India (Marxist)
- Spouse: Arati Achajee (Dey)

Manik Dey (born 18 October 1952) is an Indian politician and member of the Communist Party of India (Marxist). Dey was a member of the Tripura Legislative Assembly from the Majlishpur constituency in West Tripura district. He is an ex-minister of Power, Urban Development, Rural Development and Transport in the Manik Sarkar Government.

== Personal life & political career ==
Manik Dey was born on 18 October 1952 in Champaknagar to Chandra Dey and Basanti Dey. He only studied till the 12th grade. Dey was interested in politics from an early age. In 1978, at the age of 26, he became panchayet pradhan of the Purba Debendra Nagar. In 1988, he joined the State Committee of the Communist Party of India (Marxist). In 1993, Dey was elected to the Tripura Legislative Assembly as the MLA from Majlishpur, Jirania. In 2003, he became a Cabinet Minister in the Manik Sarkar ministry. Dey currently serves as the State Committee President of the Centre of Indian Trade Unions.

== See also ==
- Aghore Debbarma
- Manik Sarkar
- Khagen Das
