= Nalchar Assembly constituency =

Legislative Assembly constituency in Tripura State, India

Coordinates: 23.55°N 91.34°E

Nalchar
- Constituency No. 21 for the Tripura Legislative Assembly

Constituency details
- Country: India
- Region: Northeast India
- State: Tripura
- District: Sipahijala
- Lok Sabha constituency: Tripura West
- Established: 1972
- Total electors: 44,814
- Reservation: SC

Member of Legislative Assembly
- 13th Tripura Legislative Assembly
- Incumbent Kishor Barman
- Party: Bharatiya Janata Party
- Elected year: 2023

Nalchar is one of the 60 Legislative Assembly constituencies of Tripura state in India. It is in Sipahijala district and is reserved for candidates belonging to the Scheduled Castes. Nalchar is also part of West Tripura Lok Sabha constituency.

== Members of the Legislative Assembly ==
Election	Member	Party
1972	Benode Behari Das	Indian National Congress
1977	Sumanta Kumar Das	Communist Party of India
1983	Narayan Das	Indian National Congress
1988	Sukumar Barman	Communist Party of India
1993	Sukumar Barman	Communist Party of India
1998	Sukumar Barman	Communist Party of India
2003	Sukumar Barman	Communist Party of India
2008	Sukumar Barman	Communist Party of India
2012*	Tapan Chandra Das	Communist Party of India
2013	Tapan Chandra Das	Communist Party of India
2018	Subhash Chandra Das	Bharatiya Janata Party
2023	Kishor Barman	Bharatiya Janata Party

*By-election

== Election results ==
=== 2023 Assembly election ===
2023 Tripura Legislative Assembly election: Nalchar
Party	Candidate	Votes	%	±%
BJP	Kishor Barman	20,836	49.95%	▲1.47
CPI(M)	Tapan Chandra Das	18,452	44.24%	▼3.11
AITC	Lutan Das	889	2.13%	New
NOTA	None of the Above	725	1.74%	▲0.86
Independent	Bimal Das	486	1.17%	New
Independent	Sunil Chandra Das	324	0.78%	New
Margin of victory		2,384	5.72%	▲4.58
Turnout		41,712	93.19%	▼2.51
Registered electors		44,814		▲7.82
BJP hold		Swing	▲1.47	

=== 2018 Assembly election ===
2018 Tripura Legislative Assembly election: Nalchar
Party	Candidate	Votes	%	±%
BJP	Subhash Chandra Das	19,261	48.48%	▲47.00
CPI(M)	Tapan Chandra Das	18,810	47.34%	▼12.61
INC	Rakesh Das	594	1.50%	▼36.34
NOTA	None of the Above	347	0.87%	New
AMB	Ashutosh Das	230	0.58%	New
Margin of victory		451	1.14%	▼20.99
Turnout		39,732	94.48%	▼0.02
Registered electors		41,565		▲8.46
BJP gain from CPI(M)		Swing	▼11.48	

=== 2013 Assembly election ===
2013 Tripura Legislative Assembly election: Nalchar
Party	Candidate	Votes	%	±%
CPI(M)	Tapan Chandra Das	21,969	59.96%	▲7.56
INC	Uttam Das	13,862	37.83%	▼5.57
BJP	Parimal Barman	541	1.48%	▼0.34
SP	Chandan Das	270	0.74%	New
Margin of victory		8,107	22.12%	▲13.13
Turnout		36,642	96.46%	▲1.15
Registered electors		38,323		
CPI(M) hold		Swing	▲7.56	

=== 2008 Assembly election ===
2008 Tripura Legislative Assembly election: Nalchar
Party	Candidate	Votes	%	±%
CPI(M)	Sukumar Barman	14,748	52.40%	▼3.78
INC	Sukla Das	12,216	43.40%	▲2.40
BJP	Sujit Das	511	1.82%	New
Independent	Purabi Barman	465	1.65%	New
AMB	Ashutosh Das	207	0.74%	▼1.03
Margin of victory		2,532	9.00%	▼6.18
Turnout		28,147	95.09%	▲11.64
Registered electors		29,797		
CPI(M) hold		Swing	▼3.78	

=== 2003 Assembly election ===
2003 Tripura Legislative Assembly election: Nalchar
Party	Candidate	Votes	%	±%
CPI(M)	Sukumar Barman	13,220	56.18%	▼1.09
INC	Nani Gopal Das	9,648	41.00%	▲1.35
AMB	Putul Das	415	1.76%	New
Independent	Krishna Kamal Das	250	1.06%	New
Margin of victory		3,572	15.18%	▼2.44
Turnout		23,533	82.98%	▼2.22
Registered electors		28,413		▲16.22
CPI(M) hold		Swing	▼1.09	

=== 1998 Assembly election ===
1998 Tripura Legislative Assembly election: Nalchar
Party	Candidate	Votes	%	±%
CPI(M)	Sukumar Barman	11,905	57.26%	▲4.61
INC	Pulin Behari Bhowmik	8,243	39.65%	▼5.91
BJP	Subrata Sarkar	593	2.85%	New
Margin of victory		3,662	17.61%	▲10.52
Turnout		20,790	86.53%	▲0.74
Registered electors		24,447		▲3.09
CPI(M) hold		Swing		

=== 1993 Assembly election ===
1993 Tripura Legislative Assembly election: Nalchar
Party	Candidate	Votes	%	±%
CPI(M)	Sukumar Barman	10,526	52.65%	▼0.08
INC	Narayan Das	9,108	45.56%	▼0.64
Independent	Arun Sarkar	143	0.72%	New
Independent	Ashutosh Das	109	0.55%	New
Independent	Niranjan Das	106	0.53%	New
Margin of victory		1,418	7.09%	▲0.57
Turnout		19,992	85.31%	▼4.49
Registered electors		23,714		▲17.87
CPI(M) hold		Swing	▼0.08	

=== 1988 Assembly election ===
1988 Tripura Legislative Assembly election: Nalchar
Party	Candidate	Votes	%	±%
CPI(M)	Sukumar Barman	9,420	52.73%	▲4.20
INC	Narayan Das	8,254	46.20%	▼3.74
Independent	Bijay Krishna Das	112	0.63%	New
Margin of victory		1,166	6.53%	▲5.11
Turnout		17,865	89.92%	▲1.51
Registered electors		20,119		▲18.20
CPI(M) gain from INC		Swing		

=== 1983 Assembly election ===
1983 Tripura Legislative Assembly election: Nalchar
Party	Candidate	Votes	%	±%
INC	Narayan Das	7,420	49.94%	▲25.82
CPI(M)	Sumanta Kumar Das	7,210	48.53%	▼4.16
Independent	Mani Gopal Das	123	0.83%	New
Independent	Ashutosh Das	104	0.70%	New
Margin of victory		210	1.41%	▼27.15
Turnout		14,857	89.03%	▲5.76
Registered electors		17,021		▲13.65
INC gain from CPI(M)		Swing	▼2.74	

=== 1977 Assembly election ===
1977 Tripura Legislative Assembly election: Nalchar
Party	Candidate	Votes	%	±%
CPI(M)	Sumanta Kumar Das	6,433	52.69%	▲14.43
INC	Bir Chandra Barman	2,945	24.12%	▼24.65
JP	Harendra Chandra Das	2,493	20.42%	New
TPCC	Gouranga Chandra Das	339	2.78%	New
Margin of victory		3,488	28.57%	▲18.05
Turnout		12,210	83.37%	▲17.29
Registered electors		14,977		▲15.06
CPI(M) gain from INC		Swing	▲3.92	

=== 1972 Assembly election ===
1972 Tripura Legislative Assembly election: Nalchar
Party	Candidate	Votes	%	±%
INC	Benode Behari Das	4,078	48.77%	New
CPI(M)	Hari Madhab Bhowmik	3,199	38.26%	New
Independent	Harendra Chandra Das	1,085	12.98%	New
Margin of victory		879	10.51%	
Turnout		8,362	67.01%	
Registered electors		13,017		
INC win (new seat)				

== See also ==
- List of constituencies of the Tripura Legislative Assembly
- Sipahijala district
- Nalchar
- Tripura West (Lok Sabha constituency)
