= Ratan Lal Nath =

Indian politician

Cabinet Minister, Government of Tripura
- Incumbent
- Assumed office 10 March 2023
- Departments: Agriculture and Farmers' Welfare; Power; Election; Parliamentary Affairs
- Preceded by: Pranjit Singha Roy and Jishnu Dev Varma

Minister of School Education, Higher Education, Law and Parliamentary Affairs
- In office 9 March 2018 – 2 March 2023

Personal details
- Born: Ratan Lal Nath; 9 April 1948 (age 78) Tripura, India
- Party: Bharatiya Janata Party (2017 - Present)
- Other political affiliations: Indian National Congress (Before 2017)
- Cabinet: State Government of Tripura

Ratan Lal Nath (born 9 April 1948) is an Indian politician from Tripura. He is the Minister of Agriculture and Farmers Welfare, Power and Election in the second Manik Saha Ministry. He joined the BJP in 2017 after leaving the Indian National Congress. He became the MLA from the Mohanpur Constituency by defeating CPI(M) Candidate Subash Chandra Debnath by a margin of 5,176 votes.

== Controversy ==
- A video that featured BJP MLA Arun Chandra Bhowmik saying that Nath should be fired for insulting him as he went to speak about the removal of two professors from a college without offering a replacement went viral on social media.
- Nath came under fire after equating former chief minister Biplab Deb with Swami Vivekananda, Rabindranath Tagore, Mahatma Gandhi, Netaji Subhas Bose, and Albert Einstein, having stated that people in Tripura should consider themselves "fortunate" because Biplab Deb was born there, equating him with these great leaders.
- Sudip Roy Barman, a Congress candidate, requested that Chief Minister Manik Saha and the BJP take action against Law Minister Ratan Lal Nath after accusing him in the Tripura parliament of intimidating a rape victim in order to deter her from reporting the incident to the police.
