= Suryamaninagar Assembly constituency =

Legislative Assembly constituency in Tripura State, India

Coordinates: 23.76°N 91.27°E

Suryamaninagar
- Constituency No. 18 for the Tripura Legislative Assembly

Constituency details
- Country: India
- Region: Northeast India
- State: Tripura
- District: West Tripura
- Lok Sabha constituency: Tripura West
- Established: 2008
- Total electors: 54,213
- Reservation: None

Member of Legislative Assembly
- 13th Tripura Legislative Assembly
- Incumbent Ram Prasad Paul
- Party: Bharatiya Janata Party
- Elected year: 2023

Suryamaninagar is one of the 60 Legislative Assembly constituencies of Tripura state in India. It is in West Tripura district and a part of West Tripura (Lok Sabha constituency).

== Members of the Legislative Assembly ==
| Election | Member | Party |
|---|---|---|
| 2013 | Rajkumar Chowdhury | Communist Party of India |
| 2018 | Ram Prasad Paul | Bharatiya Janata Party |
| 2023 | Ram Prasad Paul | Bharatiya Janata Party |

== Election results ==
=== 2023 Assembly election ===
2023 Tripura Legislative Assembly election: Suryamaninagar
| Party | Candidate | Votes | % | ±% |
|---|---|---|---|---|
| BJP | Ram Prasad Paul | 24,991 | 49.92% | ▼2.86 |
| INC | Susanta Chakraborty | 23,083 | 46.11% | ▲45.18 |
| Independent | Mohanta Barman | 756 | 1.51% | New |
| NOTA | None of the Above | 730 | 1.46% | ▲0.77 |
| Independent | Biplab Majumder | 503 | 1.00% | New |
| Margin of victory | | 1,908 | 3.81% | ▼5.88 |
| Turnout | | 50,063 | 92.46% | ▼3.20 |
| Registered electors | | 54,213 | | ▲9.91 |
| BJP hold | | Swing | ▼2.86 | |

=== 2018 Assembly election ===
2018 Tripura Legislative Assembly election: Suryamaninagar
| Party | Candidate | Votes | % | ±% |
|---|---|---|---|---|
| BJP | Ram Prasad Paul | 24,874 | 52.78% | ▲51.44 |
| CPI(M) | Rajkumar Chowdhury | 20,307 | 43.09% | ▼7.39 |
| INC | Prasanta Bhattacharjee | 436 | 0.93% | ▼45.73 |
| NOTA | None of the Above | 325 | 0.69% | New |
| AMB | Jagadish Das | 282 | 0.60% | New |
| Margin of victory | | 4,567 | 9.69% | ▲5.87 |
| Turnout | | 47,128 | 94.47% | ▲0.01 |
| Registered electors | | 49,324 | | ▲10.05 |
| BJP gain from CPI(M) | | Swing | ▲2.31 | |

=== 2013 Assembly election ===
2013 Tripura Legislative Assembly election: Suryamaninagar
| Party | Candidate | Votes | % | ±% |
|---|---|---|---|---|
| CPI(M) | Rajkumar Chowdhury | 21,613 | 50.47% | New |
| INC | Avijit Deb | 19,979 | 46.66% | New |
| BJP | Tapas Majumder | 575 | 1.34% | New |
| Independent | Nepal Chandra Das | 382 | 0.89% | New |
| SUCI(C) | Babul Banik | 271 | 0.63% | New |
| Margin of victory | | 1,634 | 3.82% | |
| Turnout | | 42,820 | 95.62% | |
| Registered electors | | 44,818 | | |
| CPI(M) win (new seat) | | | | |

== See also ==
- List of constituencies of the Tripura Legislative Assembly
- Sipahijala district
- Tripura West (Lok Sabha constituency)
