= Fatikroy Assembly constituency =

Legislative Assembly constituency in Tripura State, India

Coordinates: 24.17°N 92.01°E

Fatikroy
- Constituency No. 51 for the Tripura Legislative Assembly

Constituency details
- Country: India
- Region: Northeast India
- State: Tripura
- District: Unakoti
- Lok Sabha constituency: Tripura East
- Established: 1967
- Total electors: 44,946
- Reservation: SC

Member of Legislative Assembly
- 13th Tripura Legislative Assembly
- Incumbent Sudhangshu Das
- Party: Bharatiya Janata Party

Fatikroy Legislative Assembly constituency is one of the 60 Legislative Assembly constituencies of Tripura state in India.

It comprises Fatikroy tehsil, along with parts of Kanchanbari tehsil and Birchandranagar tehsil, in Unakoti district and is reserved for candidates belonging to the Scheduled Castes.

== Members of the Legislative Assembly ==
Election	Member	Party
1967	Radhika Ranjan Gupta	Indian National Congress
1972	Radhika Ranjan Gupta	Indian National Congress
1977	Tarani Mohan Singha	Communist Party of India
1983	Tarani Mohan Singha	Communist Party of India
1988	Sunil Chandra Das	Indian National Congress
1993	Bhudeb Bhattacharya	Communist Party of India
1998	Ananta Pal	Communist Party of India
2003	Bijoy Roy	Communist Party of India
2008	Bijoy Roy	Communist Party of India
2013	Tunubala Malakar	Communist Party of India
2018	Sudhangshu Das	Bharatiya Janata Party
2023	Sudhangshu Das	Bharatiya Janata Party

== Election results ==
=== 2023 Assembly election ===
2023 Tripura Legislative Assembly election: Fatikroy
Party	Candidate	Votes	%	±%
BJP	Sudhangshu Das	19,570	49.96	▼1.43
CPI(M)	Subrata Das	14,458	36.91	▼7.03
TMP	Bilas Bindu Malakar	4,298	10.97	New
NOTA	None of the Above	358	0.91	▲0.09
NCPI	Pranesh Das	536	0.65%	New
Tripura Peoples Party	Sajal Das	230	0.59	▼0.18
Margin of victory		5,112	13.05	▲5.60
Turnout		39,170	88.63	▼3.22
Registered electors		44,946		▲6.98
BJP hold		Swing	▼1.43	

=== 2018 Assembly election ===
2018 Tripura Legislative Assembly election: Fatikroy
Party	Candidate	Votes	%	±%
BJP	Sudhangshu Das	19,512	51.39	▲50.31
CPI(M)	Tunubala Malakar	16,683	43.94	▼7.23
INC	Rakhu Das	730	1.92	▼43.92
NOTA	None of the Above	312	0.82	New
Tripura Peoples Party	Sajal Das	290	0.76	New
Margin of victory		2,829	7.45	▲2.12
Turnout		37,967	89.67	▼2.05
Registered electors		42,013		▲11.01
BJP gain from CPI(M)		Swing	▲0.22	

=== 2013 Assembly election ===
2013 Tripura Legislative Assembly election: Fatikroy
Party	Candidate	Votes	%	±%
CPI(M)	Tunubala Malakar	17,899	51.18	▲0.13
INC	Jugal Malakar	16,034	45.84	▲2.97
Independent	Sajal Das	467	1.34	New
BJP	Subrata Malakar	380	1.09	▼1.09
CPI(ML)L	Bishnupada Roy	196	0.56	▼0.10
Margin of victory		1,865	5.33	▼2.83
Turnout		34,976	92.52	▲0.04
Registered electors		37,846		
CPI(M) hold		Swing	▲0.13	

=== 2008 Assembly election ===
2008 Tripura Legislative Assembly election: Fatikroy
Party	Candidate	Votes	%	±%
CPI(M)	Bijoy Roy	14,457	51.04	▲1.14
INC	Sunil Chandra Das	12,144	42.88	▼1.60
BJP	Bireswar Singha	617	2.18	New
Independent	Rathindra Debnath	572	2.02	New
CPI(ML)L	Basudeb Ghosh	188	0.66	▼0.32
AITC	Jyotirmoy Deb	144	0.51	▼1.34
Margin of victory		2,313	8.17	▲2.74
Turnout		28,323	92.51	▲13.46
Registered electors		30,661		
CPI(M) hold		Swing	▲1.14	

=== 2003 Assembly election ===
2003 Tripura Legislative Assembly election: Fatikroy
Party	Candidate	Votes	%	±%
CPI(M)	Bijoy Roy	11,381	49.91	▲3.82
INC	Sujit Paul	10,144	44.48	▲1.68
AITC	Jyotirmoy Deb	421	1.85	New
Independent	Sajal Das	357	1.57	New
Independent	Amrit Lal Das	278	1.22	New
CPI(ML)L	Manik Paul	224	0.98	New
Margin of victory		1,237	5.42	▲2.14
Turnout		22,805	78.96	▲0.59
Registered electors		28,900		▲11.65
CPI(M) hold		Swing	▲3.82	

=== 1998 Assembly election ===
1998 Tripura Legislative Assembly election: Fatikroy
Party	Candidate	Votes	%	±%
CPI(M)	Ananta Pal	9,342	46.08	▼11.53
INC	Sujit Paul	8,677	42.80	▲9.90
BJP	Purnendu Bikash Dhar	2,051	10.12	▲7.76
Independent	Sunil Sinha	178	0.88	New
Margin of victory		665	3.28	▼21.43
Turnout		20,273	79.76	▼2.74
Registered electors		25,885		▲2.94
CPI(M) hold		Swing	▼11.53	

=== 1993 Assembly election ===
1993 Tripura Legislative Assembly election: Fatikroy
Party	Candidate	Votes	%	±%
CPI(M)	Bhudeb Bhattacharya	11,742	57.61	▲32.37
INC	Sunil Chandra Das	6,706	32.90	▼39.24
Independent	Kripesh Ranjan Deb	1,036	5.08	New
BJP	Anil Das	481	2.36	▲1.64
Independent	Samiran Das	195	0.96	New
Independent	Pratulchandrade	158	0.78	New
Margin of victory		5,036	24.71	▼22.19
Turnout		20,383	81.96	▼5.51
Registered electors		25,145		▲27.79
CPI(M) gain from INC		Swing	▼14.53	

=== 1988 Assembly election ===
1988 Tripura Legislative Assembly election: Fatikroy
Party	Candidate	Votes	%	±%
INC	Sunil Chandra Das	12,288	72.14	▲31.95
CPI(M)	Bhudeb Bhattacharya	4,299	25.24	▼26.41
Independent	Barindra Sutradhar	171	1.00	New
BJP	Abani Mohan Deb	123	0.72	New
Margin of victory		7,989	46.90	▲35.44
Turnout		17,034	87.60	▲1.57
Registered electors		19,677		▲13.96
INC gain from CPI(M)		Swing	▲20.49	

=== 1983 Assembly election ===
1983 Tripura Legislative Assembly election: Fatikroy
Party	Candidate	Votes	%	±%
CPI(M)	Tarani Mohan Singha	7,580	51.65	▲7.44
INC	Radhika Ranjan Gupta	5,898	40.19	▲15.63
Independent	Birendra Kumar Das	790	5.38	New
IC(S)	Manindra Chandra Bhattacharjee	407	2.77	New
Margin of victory		1,682	11.46	▼8.19
Turnout		14,675	86.31	▲3.44
Registered electors		17,266		▲2.78
CPI(M) hold		Swing	▲7.44	

=== 1977 Assembly election ===
1977 Tripura Legislative Assembly election: Fatikroy
Party	Candidate	Votes	%	±%
CPI(M)	Tarani Mohan Singha	6,057	44.21	▲15.76
INC	Gopesh Ranjan Deb	3,365	24.56	▼13.99
JP	Radhika Ranjan Gupta	2,958	21.59	New
CPI	Rakhal Rajkumar	1,272	9.28	▼15.98
Margin of victory		2,692	19.65	▲9.55
Turnout		13,700	82.67	▲15.94
Registered electors		16,799		▲5.72
CPI(M) gain from INC		Swing	▲5.66	

=== 1972 Assembly election ===
1972 Tripura Legislative Assembly election: Fatikroy
Party	Candidate	Votes	%	±%
INC	Radhika Ranjan Gupta	4,019	38.55	▼17.35
CPI(M)	Tarani Mohan Singha	2,966	28.45	New
CPI	Rakhal Raj Kumar	2,634	25.26	▼16.26
Independent	Satish Chandra De	332	3.18	New
Independent	Dhananjay Sinha	317	3.04	New
Independent	Narendra Kumar Malaker	158	1.52	New
Margin of victory		1,053	10.10	▼4.28
Turnout		10,426	67.29	▼1.43
Registered electors		15,890		▼23.16
INC hold		Swing	▼17.35	

=== 1967 Assembly election ===
1967 Tripura Legislative Assembly election: Fatikroy
Party	Candidate	Votes	%	±%
INC	Radhika Ranjan Gupta	7,750	55.90	New
CPI	Rakhal Raj Kumar	5,757	41.52	New
Independent	S. C. Biswas	357	2.58	New
Margin of victory		1,993	14.38	
Turnout		13,864	69.68	
Registered electors		20,680		
INC win (new seat)				

== See also ==
- List of constituencies of the Tripura Legislative Assembly
- Unakoti district
