= Majlishpur Assembly constituency =

Legislative Assembly constituency in Tripura State, India

Coordinates: 23.84°N 91.39°E

Majlishpur
- Constituency No. 10 for the Tripura Legislative Assembly

Constituency details
- Country: India
- Region: Northeast India
- State: Tripura
- District: West Tripura
- Lok Sabha constituency: Tripura West
- Established: 1972
- Total electors: 49,045
- Reservation: None

Member of Legislative Assembly
- 13th Tripura Legislative Assembly
- Incumbent Sushanta Chowdhury
- Party: Bharatiya Janata Party
- Elected year: 2023

Majlishpur is one of the 60 Legislative Assembly constituencies of Tripura state in India. It is in West Tripura district and is a part of Tripura West Lok Sabha constituency.

== Members of the Legislative Assembly ==
Election	Member	Party
1972	Jatindra Kumar Majumder	Indian National Congress
1977	Khagen Das	Communist Party of India
1983	Khagen Das	Communist Party of India
1988	Dipak Nag	Indian National Congress
1993	Dipak Nag	Indian National Congress
1998	Manik Dey	Communist Party of India
2003	Manik Dey	Communist Party of India
2008	Manik Dey	Communist Party of India
2013	Manik Dey	Communist Party of India
2018	Sushanta Chowdhury	Bharatiya Janata Party
2023	Sushanta Chowdhury	Bharatiya Janata Party

== Election results ==
=== 2023 Assembly election ===
2023 Tripura Legislative Assembly election: Majlishpur
Party	Candidate	Votes	%	±%
BJP	Sushanta Chowdhury	21,349	46.80%	▼5.61
CPI(M)	Sanjoy Das	16,177	35.46%	▼8.18
TMP	Samir Basu	6,996	15.33%	New
AITC	Nirmal Majumder	608	1.33%	New
NOTA	None of the Above	492	1.08%	▲0.14
Margin of victory		5,172	11.34%	▲2.57
Turnout		45,622	93.24%	▼3.43
Registered electors		49,045		▲6.64
BJP hold		Swing	▼5.61	

=== 2018 Assembly election ===
2018 Tripura Legislative Assembly election: Majlishpur
Party	Candidate	Votes	%	±%
BJP	Sushanta Chowdhury	23,249	52.41%	▲51.34
CPI(M)	Manik Dey	19,359	43.64%	▼8.79
INC	Rajib Gope	509	1.15%	▼44.07
NOTA	None of the Above	417	0.94%	New
Margin of victory		3,890	8.77%	▲1.56
Turnout		44,361	94.76%	▲0.68
Registered electors		45,993		▲8.41
BJP gain from CPI(M)		Swing	▼0.02	

=== 2013 Assembly election ===
2013 Tripura Legislative Assembly election: Majlishpur
Party	Candidate	Votes	%	±%
CPI(M)	Manik Dey	21,304	52.43%	▲1.55
INC	Bibekananda Chowdhury	18,375	45.22%	▼2.08
IPFT	Balaram Debbarma	520	1.28%	New
BJP	Dhananjoy Bhowmik	434	1.07%	▼0.74
Margin of victory		2,929	7.21%	▲3.63
Turnout		40,633	96.36%	▲2.08
Registered electors		42,426		
CPI(M) hold		Swing	▲1.55	

=== 2008 Assembly election ===
2008 Tripura Legislative Assembly election: Majlishpur
Party	Candidate	Votes	%	±%
CPI(M)	Manik Dey	17,745	50.88%	▼2.92
INC	Dipak Nag	16,497	47.30%	▲3.48
BJP	Paresh Chandra Saha	632	1.81%	New
Margin of victory		1,248	3.58%	▼6.40
Turnout		34,874	94.06%	▲11.86
Registered electors		37,220		
CPI(M) hold		Swing		

=== 2003 Assembly election ===
2003 Tripura Legislative Assembly election: Majlishpur
Party	Candidate	Votes	%	±%
CPI(M)	Manik Dey	14,908	53.80%	▲3.41
INC	Dipak Nag	12,144	43.83%	▼3.11
Independent	Upendra Debbarma	386	1.39%	New
NCP	Bipin Debbarma	271	0.98%	New
Margin of victory		2,764	9.98%	▲6.52
Turnout		27,709	81.93%	▼1.36
Registered electors		33,859		▲13.09
CPI(M) hold		Swing	▲3.41	

=== 1998 Assembly election ===
1998 Tripura Legislative Assembly election: Majlishpur
Party	Candidate	Votes	%	±%
CPI(M)	Manik Dey	12,552	50.39%	▲2.77
INC	Dipak Nag	11,692	46.94%	▼3.76
BJP	Kumud Lal Das	584	2.34%	New
Margin of victory		860	3.45%	▲0.38
Turnout		24,909	84.69%	▲2.99
Registered electors		29,939		▲3.79
CPI(M) gain from INC		Swing		

=== 1993 Assembly election ===
1993 Tripura Legislative Assembly election: Majlishpur
Party	Candidate	Votes	%	±%
INC	Dipak Nag	11,729	50.70%	▲0.08
CPI(M)	Manik Dey	11,018	47.62%	▼1.36
Independent	Gouranga Choudhary	131	0.57%	New
Margin of victory		711	3.07%	▲1.44
Turnout		23,136	81.52%	▼4.27
Registered electors		28,846		▲29.91
INC hold		Swing		

=== 1988 Assembly election ===
1988 Tripura Legislative Assembly election: Majlishpur
Party	Candidate	Votes	%	±%
INC	Dipak Nag	9,493	50.61%	▲16.74
CPI(M)	Manik Dey	9,187	48.98%	▲4.77
Margin of victory		306	1.63%	▼8.71
Turnout		18,756	86.34%	▲2.49
Registered electors		22,204		▲25.81
INC gain from CPI(M)		Swing		

=== 1983 Assembly election ===
1983 Tripura Legislative Assembly election: Majlishpur
Party	Candidate	Votes	%	±%
CPI(M)	Khagen Das	6,397	44.21%	▲7.14
INC	Ranjit Saha	4,901	33.87%	▲21.05
Independent	Dipak Nag	2,993	20.69%	New
Independent	Sunit Basu	102	0.70%	New
Independent	Gaurang Chowdhury	76	0.53%	New
Margin of victory		1,496	10.34%	▼6.47
Turnout		14,469	83.16%	▼1.22
Registered electors		17,649		▲22.69
CPI(M) hold		Swing	▲7.14	

=== 1977 Assembly election ===
1977 Tripura Legislative Assembly election: Majlishpur
Party	Candidate	Votes	%	±%
CPI(M)	Khagen Das	4,437	37.07%	▼8.14
TPCC	Jatindra Kumar Majumdar	2,425	20.26%	New
JP	Braja Gopal Nath	2,150	17.96%	New
INC	Nani Gopal Bhuia	1,535	12.83%	▼41.96
TUS	Takhiray Debbarma	927	7.75%	New
Independent	Upendra Das	239	2.00%	New
Independent	Harekrishna Shil	97	0.81%	New
Independent	Pramode Chandra Das	87	0.73%	New
Independent	Pranesh Chandra Saha	71	0.59%	New
Margin of victory		2,012	16.81%	▲7.23
Turnout		11,968	84.67%	▲14.21
Registered electors		14,385		▲46.01
CPI(M) gain from INC		Swing	▼17.72	

=== 1972 Assembly election ===
1972 Tripura Legislative Assembly election: Majlishpur
Party	Candidate	Votes	%	±%
INC	Jatindra Kumar Majumder	3,724	54.79%	New
CPI(M)	Bhanu Gosh	3,073	45.21%	New
Margin of victory		651	9.58%	
Turnout		6,797	70.59%	
Registered electors		9,852		
INC win (new seat)				

== See also ==
- List of constituencies of the Tripura Legislative Assembly
- West Tripura district
- Tripura West (Lok Sabha constituency)
