= Pranjit Singha Roy =

Indian politician

Cabinet Minister, Government of Tripura
- Incumbent
- Assumed office 2023
- Departments: Finance; Planning and Coordination; Information Technology
- Preceded by: Jishnu Dev Varma

Minister of Agriculture and Farmers Welfare, Transport and Tourism
- In office 9 March 2018 – 2 March 2023

Personal details
- Born: Pranjit Singha Roy Tripura, India
- Party: Bharatiya Janata Party
- Cabinet: State Government of Tripura

Pranjit Singha Roy is an Indian from Tripura. He was first elected as an MLA in 2013, representing the Radhakishorpur constituency in Gomati district in the Tripura Legislative Assembly.

In 2016, he was one of the six MLAs from the Indian National Congress who joined the All India Trinamool Congress, due to dissatisfaction with the party over allying with Communist Party of India (Marxist) in the 2016 West Bengal Legislative Assembly election.

In August 2017, he was one of six MLAs from the All India Trinamool Congress who joined the Bharatiya Janata Party after they voted against party lines in the 2017 Indian presidential election.
