= Radhakishorpur Assembly constituency =

Legislative Assembly constituency in Tripura State, India

Coordinates: 24.24°N 92.27°E

Radhakishorpur
- Constituency No. 31 for the Tripura Legislative Assembly

Constituency details
- Country: India
- Region: Northeast India
- State: Tripura
- District: Gomati
- Lok Sabha constituency: Tripura West
- Established: 1967
- Total electors: 48,532
- Reservation: None

Member of Legislative Assembly
- 13th Tripura Legislative Assembly
- Incumbent Pranjit Singha Roy
- Party: Bharatiya Janata Party
- Elected year: 2023

Radhakishorpur Legislative Assembly constituency is one of the 60 Legislative Assembly constituencies of Tripura state in India.

It is part of Gomati district.

== Members of the Legislative Assembly ==
Election	Member	Party
1967	N. K. Sarkar	Indian National Congress
1972	Usha Ranjan Sen	Indian National Congress
1977	Jogesh Chakraborty	Revolutionary Socialist Party
1983	Jogesh Chakraborty	Revolutionary Socialist Party
1988	Chitta Ranjan Saha	Revolutionary Socialist Party
1993	Pannalal Ghosh	Revolutionary Socialist Party
1998	Joy Gobinda Deb Roy	Revolutionary Socialist Party
2003	Joy Gobinda Deb Roy	Revolutionary Socialist Party
2008	Joy Gobinda Deb Roy	Revolutionary Socialist Party
2013	Pranjit Singha Roy	Indian National Congress
2018	Pranjit Singha Roy	Bharatiya Janata Party
2023	Pranjit Singha Roy	Bharatiya Janata Party

== Election results ==
=== 2023 Assembly election ===
2023 Tripura Legislative Assembly election: Radhakishorpur
Party	Candidate	Votes	%	±%
BJP	Pranjit Singha Roy	24,421	56.07%	▲3.54
RSP	Srikanta Datta	17,007	39.05%	▼2.13
CPI(ML)L	Partha Karmakar	1,020	2.34%	▲1.82
NOTA	None of the Above	568	1.30%	▼0.80
Independent	Bibhu Lal Dey	377	0.87%	New
Margin of victory		7,414	17.02%	▲5.66
Turnout		43,552	89.89%	▼3.72
Registered electors		48,532		▲6.32
BJP hold		Swing	▲3.54	

=== 2018 Assembly election ===
2018 Tripura Legislative Assembly election: Radhakishorpur
Party	Candidate	Votes	%	±%
BJP	Pranjit Singha Roy	22,414	52.54%	▲51.94
RSP	Srikanta Datta	17,568	41.18%	▼6.97
NOTA	None of the Above	899	2.11%	New
INC	Milan Chandra Kar	843	1.98%	▼48.26
CPI(ML)L	Partha Karmakar	222	0.52%	▼0.13
Margin of victory		4,846	11.36%	▲9.27
Turnout		42,663	92.36%	▼1.14
Registered electors		45,648		▲7.71
BJP gain from INC		Swing	▲2.30	

=== 2013 Assembly election ===
2013 Tripura Legislative Assembly election: Radhakishorpur
Party	Candidate	Votes	%	±%
INC	Pranjit Singha Roy	20,140	50.23%	▲2.43
RSP	Joy Gobinda Deb Roy	19,303	48.15%	▼1.25
CPI(ML)L	Lokman Husen	260	0.65%	▼0.23
BJP	Swapan Adhikari	239	0.60%	▼0.43
Margin of victory		837	2.09%	▲0.49
Turnout		40,093	94.70%	▼0.00
Registered electors		42,380		
INC gain from RSP		Swing	▲0.84	

=== 2008 Assembly election ===
2008 Tripura Legislative Assembly election: Radhakishorpur
Party	Candidate	Votes	%	±%
RSP	Joy Gobinda Deb Roy	14,482	49.39%	▼0.82
INC	Pranjit Singha Roy	14,015	47.80%	▲1.02
BJP	Swapan Adhikari	301	1.03%	▲0.04
Independent	Bibhu Lal Dey	265	0.90%	New
CPI(ML)L	Mujammel Ahammed Sarkar	258	0.88%	New
Margin of victory		467	1.59%	▼1.84
Turnout		29,321	94.67%	▲10.72
Registered electors		30,992		
RSP hold		Swing	▼0.82	

=== 2003 Assembly election ===
2003 Tripura Legislative Assembly election: Radhakishorpur
Party	Candidate	Votes	%	±%
RSP	Joy Gobinda Deb Roy	12,932	50.21%	▲2.67
INC	Pranjit Singha Roy	12,048	46.78%	▲0.10
BJP	Rabindra Kumar Das	253	0.98%	▼3.39
Independent	Bibhuti Bhusan Saha	164	0.64%	New
Independent	Sefali Chowdhury	162	0.63%	New
Margin of victory		884	3.43%	▲2.57
Turnout		25,754	83.96%	▲4.89
Registered electors		30,700		▲12.09
RSP hold		Swing	▲2.67	

=== 1998 Assembly election ===
1998 Tripura Legislative Assembly election: Radhakishorpur
Party	Candidate	Votes	%	±%
RSP	Joy Gobinda Deb Roy	10,288	47.55%	▼1.60
INC	Dhirendra Kumar Sen	10,101	46.68%	▲28.14
BJP	Rakhal Chakrabaorty	945	4.37%	▲0.40
CPI(ML)L	Partha Karmakar	284	1.31%	New
Margin of victory		187	0.86%	▼20.76
Turnout		21,637	80.19%	▼2.39
Registered electors		27,388		▲10.12
RSP hold		Swing	▼1.60	

=== 1993 Assembly election ===
1993 Tripura Legislative Assembly election: Radhakishorpur
Party	Candidate	Votes	%	±%
RSP	Pannalal Ghosh	9,949	49.15%	▼1.82
Independent	Ranjit Singha Roy	5,573	27.53%	New
INC	Radhika Ranjan Gupta	3,754	18.55%	▼28.68
BJP	Rakhal Chakraborty	803	3.97%	▲3.00
Margin of victory		4,376	21.62%	▲17.87
Turnout		20,241	82.41%	▼3.88
Registered electors		24,870		▲25.64
RSP hold		Swing	▼1.82	

=== 1988 Assembly election ===
1988 Tripura Legislative Assembly election: Radhakishorpur
Party	Candidate	Votes	%	±%
RSP	Chitta Ranjan Saha	8,604	50.97%	▼0.47
INC	Ranajit Singha Roy	7,971	47.22%	▼0.73
BJP	Nitish Saha	163	0.97%	New
Margin of victory		633	3.75%	▲0.26
Turnout		16,879	86.13%	▲2.37
Registered electors		19,795		▲19.40
RSP hold		Swing		

=== 1983 Assembly election ===
1983 Tripura Legislative Assembly election: Radhakishorpur
Party	Candidate	Votes	%	±%
RSP	Jogesh Chakraborty	7,070	51.44%	▼3.17
INC	Bhanu Gopal Baisnab	6,590	47.95%	▲30.45
Margin of victory		480	3.49%	▼33.63
Turnout		13,743	84.17%	▲3.43
Registered electors		16,579		▲31.35
RSP hold		Swing		

=== 1977 Assembly election ===
1977 Tripura Legislative Assembly election: Radhakishorpur
Party	Candidate	Votes	%	±%
RSP	Jogesh Chakraborty	5,478	54.62%	New
INC	Usha Ranjan Sen	1,755	17.50%	▼30.87
CFD	Brajaraman Sarkar	877	8.74%	New
JP	Aditya Ranjan Nag	617	6.15%	New
CPI	Sunil Krishna Das	565	5.63%	▼11.27
Independent	Priyaranjan Majumder	383	3.82%	New
Independent	Tapan Majumder	237	2.36%	New
Independent	Prativa Dey	118	1.18%	New
Margin of victory		3,723	37.12%	▲23.47
Turnout		10,030	80.80%	▲9.06
Registered electors		12,622		▼12.05
RSP gain from INC		Swing	▲6.24	

=== 1972 Assembly election ===
1972 Tripura Legislative Assembly election: Radhakishorpur
Party	Candidate	Votes	%	±%
INC	Usha Ranjan Sen	4,888	48.37%	▼19.50
CPI(M)	Sushil Mukerjee	3,509	34.73%	New
CPI	Sunil Krishna Das	1,708	16.90%	▼2.54
Margin of victory		1,379	13.65%	▼34.77
Turnout		10,105	72.70%	▲0.83
Registered electors		14,352		▼37.69
INC hold		Swing	▼19.50	

=== 1967 Assembly election ===
1967 Tripura Legislative Assembly election: Radhakishorpur
Party	Candidate	Votes	%	±%
INC	N. K. Sarkar	10,878	67.87%	New
CPI	Sunil Krishna Das	3,117	19.45%	New
Independent	B. Das	2,033	12.68%	New
Margin of victory		7,761	48.42%	
Turnout		16,028	72.54%	
Registered electors		23,035		
INC win (new seat)				

== See also ==
- List of constituencies of the Tripura Legislative Assembly
- Gomati district
