= Chandipur, Tripura Assembly constituency =

Legislative Assembly constituency in Tripura State, India

Coordinates: 24.31°N 91.99°E

Chandipur
- Constituency No. 52 for the Tripura Legislative Assembly

Constituency details
- Country: India
- Region: Northeast India
- State: Tripura
- District: Unakoti
- Lok Sabha constituency: Tripura East
- Established: 1972
- Total electors: 46,705
- Reservation: None

Member of Legislative Assembly
- 13th Tripura Legislative Assembly
- Incumbent Tinku Roy
- Party: Bharatiya Janata Party
- Elected year: 2023

Chandipur Legislative Assembly constituency is one of the 60 Legislative Assembly constituencies of Tripura state in India.

It is part of Unakoti district. As of 2023, it is represented by Tinku Roy of the Bharatiya Janata Party.

== Members of the Legislative Assembly ==
Election	Member	Party
1972	Manindralal Bhowmik	Indian National Congress
1977	Baidyanath Majumdar	Communist Party of India
1983	Baidyanath Majumdar	Communist Party of India
1988	Baidyanath Majumdar	Communist Party of India
1993	Baidyanath Majumdar	Communist Party of India
1998	Baidyanath Majumdar	Communist Party of India
2003	Tapan Chakraborty	Communist Party of India
2008	Tapan Chakraborty	Communist Party of India
2013	Tapan Chakraborty	Communist Party of India
2018	Tapan Chakraborty	Communist Party of India
2023	Tinku Roy	Bharatiya Janata Party

== Election results ==
=== 2023 Assembly election ===
2023 Tripura Legislative Assembly election: Chandipur
Party	Candidate	Votes	%	±%
BJP	Tinku Roy	17,395	42.68%	▼3.78
CPI(M)	Krishnendu Chowdhury	16,818	41.26%	New
TMP	Ranjan Singha	5,379	13.20%	New
NOTA	None of the Above	587	1.44%	▲0.33
AITC	Bidyut Bikas Sinha	582	1.43%	New
Margin of victory		577	1.42%	▲0.39
Turnout		40,761	87.61%	▼3.61
Registered electors		46,705		▲8.68
BJP gain from CPI(M)		Swing	▼4.81	

=== 2018 Assembly election ===
2018 Tripura Legislative Assembly election: Chandipur
Party	Candidate	Votes	%	±%
CPI(M)	Tapan Chakraborty	18,545	47.48%	▼10.95
BJP	Kaberi Singha	18,143	46.45%	▲44.66
INC	Nirmalendu Deb	1,025	2.62%	▼34.59
NOTA	None of the Above	432	1.11%	New
Independent	Dasarath Sarkar	214	0.55%	New
Margin of victory		402	1.03%	▼20.19
Turnout		39,057	90.22%	▼0.91
Registered electors		42,974		▲9.71
CPI(M) hold		Swing	▼10.95	

=== 2013 Assembly election ===
2013 Tripura Legislative Assembly election: Chandipur
Party	Candidate	Votes	%	±%
CPI(M)	Tapan Chakraborty	21,009	58.43%	▲1.99
INC	Nirmalendu Deb	13,380	37.21%	▲0.16
BJP	Ranjan Sinha	643	1.79%	▼0.89
Independent	Rudra Kanta Sinha	533	1.48%	New
CPI(ML)L	Chiranjib Bhattacharjee	391	1.09%	▼0.36
Margin of victory		7,629	21.22%	▲1.83
Turnout		35,956	91.92%	▼0.45
Registered electors		39,170		
CPI(M) hold		Swing	▲1.99	

=== 2008 Assembly election ===
2008 Tripura Legislative Assembly election: Chandipur
Party	Candidate	Votes	%	±%
CPI(M)	Tapan Chakraborty	17,565	56.44%	▲0.72
INC	Rudrendu Bhattacharjee	11,531	37.05%	▼3.82
BJP	Kaberi Sinha	834	2.68%	▲1.26
Independent	Rudra Kanta Sinha	514	1.65%	New
CPI(ML)L	Chiranjib Bhattacharjee	451	1.45%	New
AITC	Subhendu Das	226	0.73%	New
Margin of victory		6,034	19.39%	▲4.54
Turnout		31,121	92.38%	▲9.75
Registered electors		33,736		
CPI(M) hold		Swing	▲0.72	

=== 2003 Assembly election ===
2003 Tripura Legislative Assembly election: Chandipur
Party	Candidate	Votes	%	±%
CPI(M)	Tapan Chakraborty	14,010	55.72%	▲0.52
INC	Debasish Sen	10,277	40.88%	▲2.92
BJP	Debasish Urang	357	1.42%	▼5.42
Independent	Radhacharan Singha	295	1.17%	New
Margin of victory		3,733	14.85%	▼2.40
Turnout		25,142	82.56%	▲0.15
Registered electors		30,474		▲10.36
CPI(M) hold		Swing	▲0.52	

=== 1998 Assembly election ===
1998 Tripura Legislative Assembly election: Chandipur
Party	Candidate	Votes	%	±%
CPI(M)	Baidyanath Majumdar	12,553	55.20%	▼3.23
INC	Debasish Sen	8,630	37.95%	▲2.58
BJP	Santosh Debroy	1,556	6.84%	▲3.79
Margin of victory		3,923	17.25%	▼5.81
Turnout		22,739	83.91%	▲0.25
Registered electors		27,613		▲4.66
CPI(M) hold		Swing		

=== 1993 Assembly election ===
1993 Tripura Legislative Assembly election: Chandipur
Party	Candidate	Votes	%	±%
CPI(M)	Baidyanath Majumdar	12,656	58.43%	▲5.05
INC	Nirode Baran Das	7,662	35.38%	▼9.51
BJP	Santosh Deb Roy	661	3.05%	▲1.74
Independent	Radhacharan Singha	367	1.69%	New
Independent	Babul Mia	135	0.62%	New
Margin of victory		4,994	23.06%	▲14.56
Turnout		21,659	83.41%	▼8.67
Registered electors		26,383		▲26.22
CPI(M) hold		Swing	▲5.05	

=== 1988 Assembly election ===
1988 Tripura Legislative Assembly election: Chandipur
Party	Candidate	Votes	%	±%
CPI(M)	Baidyanath Majumdar	10,128	53.38%	▼1.26
INC	Debasish Sen	8,516	44.89%	▲0.30
BJP	Nagendra Chakraborty	248	1.31%	New
Margin of victory		1,612	8.50%	▼1.56
Turnout		18,972	91.75%	▲3.32
Registered electors		20,902		▲10.17
CPI(M) hold		Swing		

=== 1983 Assembly election ===
1983 Tripura Legislative Assembly election: Chandipur
Party	Candidate	Votes	%	±%
CPI(M)	Baidyanath Majumdar	9,066	54.64%	▼9.74
INC	Birajit Sinha	7,398	44.59%	▲21.77
Independent	Harekrishna Das	127	0.77%	New
Margin of victory		1,668	10.05%	▼31.51
Turnout		16,591	88.38%	▲6.18
Registered electors		18,972		▲7.94
CPI(M) hold		Swing		

=== 1977 Assembly election ===
1977 Tripura Legislative Assembly election: Chandipur
Party	Candidate	Votes	%	±%
CPI(M)	Baidyanath Majumdar	9,197	64.38%	▲19.45
INC	Manindralal Bhowmik	3,260	22.82%	▼26.12
JP	Jatish Chandra Bhattacharji	857	6.00%	New
TPCC	Haridas Singh	780	5.46%	New
TUS	Nandalal Singha	172	1.20%	New
Margin of victory		5,937	41.56%	▲37.55
Turnout		14,285	82.56%	▲5.09
Registered electors		17,577		▲91.72
CPI(M) gain from INC		Swing	▲15.44	

=== 1972 Assembly election ===
1972 Tripura Legislative Assembly election: Chandipur
Party	Candidate	Votes	%	±%
INC	Manindralal Bhowmik	3,418	48.94%	New
CPI(M)	Baidyanath Majumdar	3,138	44.93%	New
Independent	Surendrra Baidya	428	6.13%	New
Margin of victory		280	4.01%	
Turnout		6,984	77.71%	
Registered electors		9,168		
INC win (new seat)				

== See also ==
- List of constituencies of the Tripura Legislative Assembly
- Unakoti district
