= List of by-elections to the Tripura Legislative Assembly =

The following is a list of by-elections held for the Tripura Legislative Assembly, India, since its formation in 1971.

== 11th Assembly ==
=== 2012 ===
S.No	Date	Constituency	MLA before election	Party before election	Elected MLA	Party after election
20	12 June 2012	Nalchar	Sukumar Barman	Communist Party of India	Tapan Chandra Das	Communist Party of India

=== 2014 ===
S.No	Date	Constituency	MLA before election	Party before election	Elected MLA	Party after election
1	13 September 2014	Manu	Jitendra Choudhury	Communist Party of India (Marxist)	Prabhat Chowdhury	Communist Party of India (Marxist)

=== 2015 ===
S.No	Date	Constituency	MLA before election	Party before election	Elected MLA	Party after election
1	27 June 2015	Pratapgarh	Anil Sarkar	Communist Party of India (Marxist)	Ramu Das	Communist Party of India (Marxist)
2	27 June 2015	Surma	Sudhir Das	Communist Party of India (Marxist)	Anjan Das	Communist Party of India (Marxist)

=== 2016 ===
S.No	Date	Constituency	MLA before election	Party before election	Elected MLA	Party after election
1	13 February 2016	Amarpur	Manoranjan Acharjee	Communist Party of India (Marxist)	Parimal Debnath	Communist Party of India (Marxist)
2	19 November 2016	Barjala	Jitendra Sarkar	Communist Party of India (Marxist)	Jhumu Sarkar	Communist Party of India (Marxist)
3	19 November 2016	Khowai	Samsir Debsarkar	Communist Party of India (Marxist)	Biswajit Dutta	Communist Party of India (Marxist)

== 12th Assembly ==
=== 2019 ===
S.No	Date	Constituency	MLA before election	Party before election	Elected MLA	Party after election
1	23 September 2019	Badharghat	Dilip Sarkar	Bharatiya Janata Party	Mimi Majumder	Bharatiya Janata Party

=== 2022 ===
Date	S.No	Constituency	MLA before election	Party before election	Elected MLA	Party after election
23 June 2022	6	Agartala	Sudip Roy Barman	Bharatiya Janata Party	Sudip Roy Barman	Indian National Congress
23 June 2022	8	Town Bordowali	Ashish Kumar Saha	Bharatiya Janata Party	Manik Saha	Bharatiya Janata Party
23 June 2022	46	Surma	Asish Das	Bharatiya Janata Party	Swapna Das Paul	Bharatiya Janata Party
23 June 2022	57	Jubarajnagar	Ramendra Chandra Debnath	Communist Party of India (Marxist)	Malina Debnath	Bharatiya Janata Party

== 13th Assembly ==
=== 2023 ===
Date	S.No	Constituency	MLA before election	Party before election	Elected MLA	Party after election
5 September 2023	20	Boxanagar	Samsul Haque	Communist Party of India (Marxist)	Tafajjal Hossain	Bharatiya Janata Party
5 September 2023	23	Dhanpur	Pratima Bhoumik	Bharatiya Janata Party	Bindu Debnath	Bharatiya Janata Party

=== 2024 ===
Date	Constituency		Previous MLA		Reason	Elected MLA	
19 April 2024	7	Ramnagar	Surajit Datta	Bharatiya Janata Party	Died on 27 December 2023	Dipak Majumder	Bharatiya Janata Party

=== 2026 ===
Date	Constituency		Previous MLA		Reason	Elected MLA	
4 May 2026	56	Dharmanagar	Biswa Bandhu Sen	Bharatiya Janata Party	Died on 26 December 2025	Jahar Chakraborti	Bharatiya Janata Party
