= 2023 Tripura Legislative Assembly election =

Indian state assembly election

- 16 February 2023

All 60 seats in the Tripura Legislative Assembly 31 seats needed for a majority
- Opinion polls
- Registered: 2,824,928
- Turnout: 89.83% (▼1.55 pp)
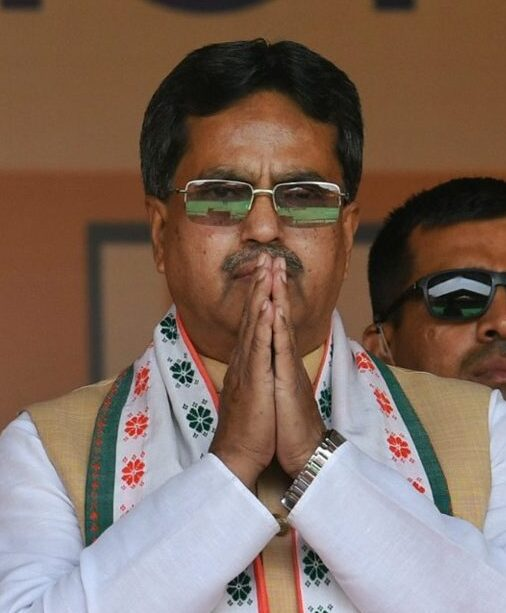

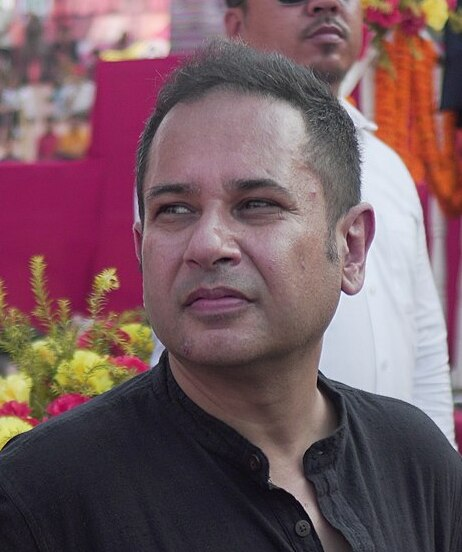
	Majority party	Minority party
Leader	Manik Saha	Pradyot Debbarma
Party	BJP	TMP
Alliance	NDA
Leader since	2022	2019
Leader's seat	Town Bordowali	Did not contest
Last election	43.59%, 36 seats	Did not exist
Seats won	32	13
Seat change	▼4	New
Popular vote	985,797	498,182
Percentage	38.97%	19.69%
Swing	▼4.62 pp	New
	Third party	Fourth party
Leader	Jitendra Chaudhury	Birajit Sinha
Party	CPI(M)	INC
Alliance	SDF	SDF
Leader since	1998	2022
Leader's seat	Sabroom	Kailashahar
Last election	42.22%, 16 seats	1.79%, 0 seats
Seats won	11	3
Seat change	▼5	▲3
Popular vote	622,869	216,637
Percentage	24.62%	8.56%
Swing	▼17.6 pp	▲6.77 pp

Chief Minister before election
Manik Saha
BJP
Elected Chief Minister
Manik Saha
BJP

The 2023 Tripura Legislative Assembly elections were held on 16 February 2023 to elect all 60 members of the Tripura Legislative Assembly. The votes were counted and the results were declared on 2 March 2023.

The Bharatiya Janata Party won a simple majority, defeating its rivals Secular Democratic Forces and the Tipra Motha Party. Tipra Motha Party won 13 seats at its debut and became the largest opposition party in Tripura.

== Background ==
The tenure of 12th Tripura Assembly was scheduled to end on 22 March 2023. The previous assembly elections were held in February 2018. After the election, Bharatiya Janata Party formed the state government, with Biplab Kumar Deb becoming the Chief Minister.

Biplab Kumar Deb resigned from Chief Minister post on 14 May 2022 and he was succeeded by Manik Saha as the new chief minister.

=== TTAADC elections ===
Tripura Tribal Areas Autonomous District Council elections were held in April 2021, in which a new Tripuri outfit, the Tipraha Indigenous Progressive Regional Alliance, formed by a scion of the erstwhile royal family of Tripura, Pradyot Bikram Manikya Deb Barma, won an astounding victory, drubbing both the Bharatiya Janata Party and the Communist Party of India (Marxist), with the TIPRA and its ally the Indigenous Nationalist Party of Twipra winning a total of 18 out of the 28 elected council seats. The BJP was restricted to 9 seats and the CPI(M) was completely washed out, unable to win any seats, losing their supermajority of 100% seats in the council.

=== Major political defections ===
In 2022, 8 National Democratic Alliance (5 Bharatiya Janata Party and 3 Indigenous People's Front of Tripura) MLAs resigned and left the BJP, out of which 4 joined TIPRA, 3 joined the Indian National Congress, and 1 joined the Trinamool Congress (albeit later resigned from the party). There have been defections in the TTAADC where BJP MDC leader Hangsha Kumar Tripura joined TIPRA.

== Schedule ==
The election schedule was announced by the Election Commission of India on 18 January 2023.

Poll event	Schedule
Notification date	21 January 2023
Last date for filing nomination	30 January 2023
Scrutiny of nomination	31 January 2023
Last date for withdrawal of nomination	2 February 2023
Date of poll	16 February 2023
Date of Counting of Votes	2 March 2023
Date of Oath taking	8 March 2023
1st Cabinet Meeting	9 March 2023

== Parties and alliances ==
=== National Democratic Alliance ===
Map of the seat sharing arrangement of National Democratic Alliance

Reports emerged in late January in which the Tipra Motha Party was in talks for a possible alliance with the BJP and IPFT. During this time the Tipra Motha Party and the IPFT held talks for a possible merger. However last minute reports later stated that BJP talks with TMP fell off while BJP announced to continue alliance with IPFT, BJP announced that the party was still against IPFT's demand for Tipraland and that the party would be allotted 6 seats as per the alliance agreement.

National Democratic Alliance
Party	Flag	Symbol	Leader	Seats contested
Bharatiya Janata Party			Manik Saha	55
Indigenous People's Front of Tripura			Prem Kumar Reang	6
Total				61 (Note: BJP and IPFT will have a contest on Ampinagar constituency)

=== Secular Democratic Forces ===
Map of the seat sharing arrangement of Secular Democratic Forces

In early January reports emerged that the Congress and CPI(M) had begun talks of a possible alliance between the parties to unitedly defeat the incumbent government (NDA). Congress and CPI(M) had initially held talks with the Tipra Motha Party however both parties later backed out of the talks as each party did not want to change its ideological stance for the alliance with each other. The TMP later announced it would be contesting alone in the upcoming election while on 14 January 2023, the CPI(M) and the Congress announced to enter into seat sharing agreement for the upcoming assembly elections. General Secretary of the CPI(M) Sitaram Yechury said the main purpose of organising this united front between opposition parties was to defeat the BJP. On 25 January 2023, Left Front convenor Narayan Kar announced seat sharing formula : CPI(M) – 43 seats, Congress – 13 seats, CPI – 1 seat, RSP – 1 seat, AIFB – 1 seat and independent – 1 seat. After the Congress announced candidates for 17 seats, Left Front filled candidates in all 60 seats (CPIM – 56, CPI – 1, RSP – 1, AIFB – 1, Independent -1). Later after CPI(M) stated it would withdraw 13 candidates and allot the seats to the INC, however INC stated they were looking for 17 seats. Post discussions INC agreed to 13 seats however they were given preference in choosing the seats in which they want to contest.

Purushuttam Roy Barman, independent candidate of SDF from Ramnagar was also supported by the Tipra Motha Party against the BJP.

Secular Democratic Forces
Party	Flag	Symbol	Leader	Alliance	Seats contested
Communist Party of India (Marxist)			Jitendra Chaudhury	LF	43
Communist Party of India			Judhisthir Das	LF	1
Revolutionary Socialist Party			Dipak Deb	LF	1
All India Forward Bloc			Paresh Chandra Sarkar	LF	1
Independent			Purushuttam Roy Barman	LF	1
Indian National Congress			Birajit Sinha	UPA	13
Total					60

=== Others ===
Party	Flag	Symbol	Leader	Seats contested
Tipra Motha Party			Pradyot Debbarma	42
Trinamool Congress			Pijush Kanti Biswas	28
Communist Party of India (Marxist-Leninist) Liberation			Partha Karmakar	1

== Candidates ==
District	Constituency		NDA		SDF		TMP+	
District	#	Name	Party	Candidate	Party	Candidate	Party	Candidate
West Tripura	1	Simna (ST)	BJP	Binod Debbarma	CPI(M)	Kumodh Debbarma	TMP	Brishaketu Debbarma
West Tripura	2	Mohanpur	BJP	Ratan Lal Nath	INC	Prasanta Sen Chowdhury	TMP	Tapas Dey
West Tripura	3	Bamutia (SC)	BJP	Krishnadhan Das	CPI(M)	Nayan Sarkar	TMP	Nitai Sarkar
West Tripura	4	Barjala (SC)	BJP	Dilip Kumar Das	CPI(M)	Sudip Sarkar		
West Tripura	5	Khayerpur	BJP	Ratan Chakraborty	CPI(M)	Pabitra Kar		
West Tripura	6	Agartala	BJP	Papiya Datta	INC	Sudip Roy Barman		
West Tripura	7	Ramnagar	BJP	Surajit Datta	IND	Purushuttam Roy Barman	TMP supports IND	
West Tripura	8	Town Bordowali	BJP	Manik Saha	INC	Ashish Kumar Saha		
West Tripura	9	Banamalipur	BJP	Rajib Bhattacharjee	INC	Gopal Roy		
West Tripura	10	Majlishpur	BJP	Sushanta Chowdhury	CPI(M)	Sanjoy Das	TMP	Samir Basu
West Tripura	11	Mandaibazar (ST)	BJP	Tarit Debbarma	CPI(M)	Radhacharan Debbarma	TMP	Swapna Debbarma
Sipahijala	12	Takarjala (ST)	IPFT	Bidhan Debbarma	CPI(M)	Shyamal Debbarma	TMP	Biswajit Kalai
West Tripura	13	Pratapgarh (SC)	BJP	Rebati Mohan Das	CPI(M)	Ramu Das		
West Tripura	14	Badharghat (SC)	BJP	Mina Rani Sarkar	AIFB	Partha Ranjan Sarkar		
Sipahijala	15	Kamalasagar	BJP	Antara Sarkar Deb	CPI(M)	Hiranmoy Narayan Debnath	TMP	Ashish Das
Sipahijala	16	Bishalgarh	BJP	Sushanta Deb	CPI(M)	Partha Pratim Majumder	TMP	Md Shah Alam Miah
Sipahijala	17	Golaghati (ST)	BJP	Himani Debbarma	CPI(M)	Brinda Debbarma	TMP	Manav Debbarma
West Tripura	18	Suryamaninagar	BJP	Ram Prasad Paul	INC	Susanta Chakraborty		
Sipahijala	19	Charilam (ST)	BJP	Jishnu Deb Barman	INC	Ashok Debbarma	TMP	Subodh (Khatung) Debbarma
Sipahijala	20	Boxanagar	BJP	Taffajal Hossain	CPI(M)	Samsul Haque	TMP	Abu Khayer Miah
Sipahijala	21	Nalchar (SC)	BJP	Kishor Barman	CPI(M)	Tapan Das		
Sipahijala	22	Sonamura	BJP	Debabrata Bhattacharjee	CPI(M)	Shyamal Chakraborty		
Sipahijala	23	Dhanpur	BJP	Pratima Bhoumik	CPI(M)	Koushik Chanda	TMP	Amiya Noatia
Khowai	24	Ramchandraghat (ST)	IPFT	Prasanta Debbarma	CPI(M)	Ranjit Debbarma	TMP	Ranjit Debbarma
Khowai	25	Khowai	BJP	Subrata Majumdar	CPI(M)	Nirmal Biswas		
Khowai	26	Asharambari (ST)	IPFT	Jayanti Debbarma	CPI(M)	Dilip Debbarma	TMP	Animesh Debbarma
Khowai	27	Kalyanpur-Pramodenagar	BJP	Pinaki Das Chowdhury	CPI(M)	Manindra Das	TMP	Manihar Debbarma
Khowai	28	Teliamura	BJP	Kalyani Roy	INC	Ashok Kumar Baidya	TMP	Abhijit Sarkar
Khowai	29	Krishnapur (ST)	BJP	Bikash Debbarma	CPI(M)	Swasthi Debbarma	TMP	Mahendra Debbarma
Gomati	30	Bagma (ST)	BJP	Ram Pada Jamatia	CPI(M)	Naresh Jamatia	TMP	Purna Chandra Jamatia
Gomati	31	Radhakishorpur	BJP	Pranjit Singha Roy	RSP	Srikanta Datta		
Gomati	32	Matarbari	BJP	Abhishek Debroy	INC	Pranajit Roy	TMP	Bir Noatia
Gomati	33	Kakraban-Salgarh (SC)	BJP	Jitendra Majumdar	CPI(M)	Ratan Kumar Bhowmik	TMP	Kshir Mohan Das
South Tripura	34	Rajnagar (SC)	BJP	Swapna Majumdar	CPI(M)	Sudhan Das	TMP	Abhijit Malakar
South Tripura	35	Belonia	BJP	Gautam Sarkar	CPI(M)	Dipankar Sen		
South Tripura	36	Santirbazar (ST)	BJP	Pramod Reang	CPI	Satyajit Reang	TMP	Harendra Reang
South Tripura	37	Hrishyamukh	BJP	Dipayan Chowdhury	CPI(M)	Asoke Chandra Mitra	TMP	Arup Deb
South Tripura	38	Jolaibari (ST)	IPFT	Sukla Charan Noatia	CPI(M)	Debendra Tripura	TMP	Gaurab (Shihanu) Mog
South Tripura	39	Manu (ST)	BJP	Mailafru Mog	CPI(M)	Pravat Chowdhury	TMP	Dhananjoy Tripura
South Tripura	40	Sabroom	BJP	Sankar Roy	CPI(M)	Jitendra Chaudhury		
Gomati	41	Ampinagar (ST)	BJP	Patal Kanya Jamatiya	CPI(M)	Parikshit Kalai	TMP	Pathan Lal Jamatia
Gomati	41	Ampinagar (ST)	IPFT	Sindhu Chandra Jamatia	CPI(M)	Parikshit Kalai	TMP	Pathan Lal Jamatia
Gomati	42	Amarpur	BJP	Ranjit Das	CPI(M)	Parimal Debnath	TMP	Ashi Ram Reang
Gomati	43	Karbook (ST)	BJP	Ashim Tripura	CPI(M)	Priyamani Debbarma	TMP	Sanjay Manik Tripura
Dhalai	44	Raima Valley (ST)	BJP	Bikas Chakma	CPI(M)	Pabin Tripura	TMP	Nandita Debbarma Reang
Dhalai	45	Kamalpur	BJP	Manoj Kanti Deb	INC	Rubi Ghosh	TMP	Meri Debbarma
Dhalai	46	Surma (SC)	BJP	Swapna Das Paul	CPI(M)	Anjan Das	TMP	Shyamal Sarkar
Dhalai	47	Ambassa (ST)	BJP	Suchitra Debbarma	CPI(M)	Amalendu Debbarma	TMP	Chitta Ranjan Debbarma
Dhalai	48	Karamcherra (ST)	BJP	Brajalal Debnath	INC	Diba Chandra Hrangkhawl	TMP	Paul Dangshu
Dhalai	49	Chawamanu (ST)	BJP	Sambhu Lal Chakma	CPI(M)	Jiban Mohan Tripura	TMP	Hongsa Kumar Tripura
Unakoti	50	Pabiachhara (SC)	BJP	Bhagaban Chandra Das	INC	Satyaban Das	TMP	Gobinda Das
Unakoti	51	Fatikroy (SC)	BJP	Sudhangshu Das	CPI(M)	Subrata Das	TMP	Bilas Malakar
Unakoti	52	Chandipur	BJP	Tinku Roy	CPI(M)	Krishnendu Chowdhury	TMP	Ranjan Sinha
Unakoti	53	Kailashahar	BJP	Moboshar Ali	INC	Birajit Sinha		
North Tripura	54	Kadamtala-Kurti	BJP	Dilip Tanti	CPI(M)	Islam Uddin		
North Tripura	55	Bagbassa	BJP	Jadab Lal Nath	CPI(M)	Bijita Nath	TMP	Kalpana Sinha
North Tripura	56	Dharmanagar	BJP	Biswa Bandhu Sen	INC	Chayan Bhattacharya		
North Tripura	57	Jubarajnagar	BJP	Malina Debnath	CPI(M)	Shailendra Chandra Debnath		
North Tripura	58	Panisagar	BJP	Binay Bhushan Das	CPI(M)	Shital Das	TMP	Joy Chung Halam
North Tripura	59	Pencharthal (ST)	BJP	Santana Chakma	CPI(M)	Sadhan Kumar Chakma	TMP	Hollywood Chakma
North Tripura	60	Kanchanpur (ST)	IPFT	Prem Kumar Reang	CPI(M)	Rajendra Reang	TMP	Phillip Kumar Reang

== Issues ==
=== 10323 Teachers batch ===
In 2017, a Tripura High Court order was confirmed by a Supreme Court bench that declared the recruitment of teachers in batches between 2010 and 2013 to be "unconstitutional" because of a policy that gave preference to poor and senior candidates. The confirmation had happened a few months before the 2018 Tripura Legislative Assembly election and the Bharatiya Janata Party had promised that the teachers would be retained if they came to power and their jobs would be saved even if they had to resort to amending the constitution. The teachers, numbering 10,323 extended their support to the BJP in the election and were moved to a contractual status for about two years but were then terminated and replaced with new hires. The teachers faced economic hardships after the sacking and many of them have become indebted and have resorted to menial jobs. Of those sacked, 150 have died with 8 of them confirmed to be suicides, including Rumi Debbarma, a master's degree gold medalist, who was forcefully evicted from an indefinite roadside protest and couldn't take the humiliation of termination.

The teachers had held hundreds of protests, demonstration and rallies, and met with several chief ministers and their cabinets. The protests were met with harsh police actions and cases lodged against several of the teachers. The BJP government in Tripura has shifted its position and refused to reinstate the teachers, one minister Ratan Lal Nath had called them unqualified.

The Communist Party of India (Marxist) have extended their support to the teachers and promised to reinstate them in its manifesto. To give assurances to their promise, The Left Front has fielded two of the teachers Sudip Sarkar (CPIM) and Satyajit Reang (CPI) as its own candidates from the constituencies of Barjala and Santirbazar respectively. Former chief minister Manik Sarkar has stated that the order was "most unfortunate" as it overturned a policy that they had introduced to help the weaker sections of society and even alleged that the bench was linked to the Sangh Parivar. The Tipra Motha Party and lawyer Kapil Sibal, an independent MP have also extended their support to the teachers.

=== Tipraland Movement ===
The Tipraha Indigenous Progressive Regional Alliance (TIPRA) has demanded a separate state for the Kokborok-speaking Tripuri population called Tipraland to be created out of the Bengali Hindu majority state from the areas included under the Tripura Tribal Areas Autonomous District Council. However the ruling party BJP refuses to bifurcate the state. TIPRA party also has won elections in 2021 Tripura Tribal Areas Autonomous District Council election. The TTADC areas have 20 of the 60 Assembly seats in Tripura Legislative Assembly.

Ruling BJP has offered talk with the TIPRA party for their demand. Former Chief Minister Biplab Kumar Deb stated that demands by TIPRA are not possible without BJP. But Chief Minister, Manik Saha said that Tipraland is not possible.

Home Ministry on 25 January 2023 called upon TIPRA leadership to discuss the issue of Greater Tipraland. The talk however did not result in any announcement as the delegates did not reach to any agreement.

=== Bru refugees ===
Bru refugees who are living in shelters are demanding food and monetary help. They are demanding faster rehabilitation.

== Campaigns ==
=== Bharatiya Janata Party ===
Prime Minister Narendra Modi visited Agartala, Tripura on 18 December 2022 and addressed a public meeting. He was welcomed by his supporters at the city. He praised the work done by the BJP government and said that Tripura is becoming logistics hub of northeast India.

Manifesto

- More autonomy to the tribal areas amid a demand for a separate state.
- A meal in Rs. 5.
- Rs. 50,000 to EWS families on the birth of a girl-child.
- A scooty to meritorious college going girls.
- Smart phones to 50,000 meritorious students.
- Two free LPG cylinders to the beneficiaries of PM Ujjwala Yojana.
- Land pattas to all eligible landless citizens.
- Financial assistance of Rs 3,000 per year to landless farmers.
- Annual financial assistance of Rs 5,000 to ST families under Tripura Janjati Bikash Yojana.
- Establishment of Maharaja Bir Bikram Manikya Tribal University in Gandacherra to research, promote and preserve tribal culture and studies.

=== Communist Party of India (Marxist) ===
CPI(M) launched door-to-door campaign against the ‘propaganda’ of BJP's ‘Good Governance’ on 25 December 2022 and urged people not to establish the BJP government. On 8 January 2023, CPIM leaders appealed people to oust the incumbent government mentioning BJP's 2018 poll promises as 'jumla' (false promise) in a public meeting organised by Centre of Indian Trade Unions.

Manifesto

CPI(M) released its manifesto on 3 February 2023.

- Restoration of democratic, political and religious rights.
- 200-day work to the poor under MGNREGA.
- Bring back the Old Pension Scheme if it came to power. The scheme has been reimplemented in Rajasthan, Chhattisgarh, and Himachal Pradesh.
- 250,000 new jobs in government, semi-government and private sectors in next 5 years.
- Free electricity up to 50 units per family.
- Two DA hikes for government employees every year based on consumer prime index.
- Reinstatement of the 10,323 suspended teachers.
- Regularisation of services of contractual employees.
- Maximum possible autonomy to the tribal council (TTAADC).
- Social pension to seniors (>60 years) earning under ₹1 lakh (100,000 rupees) per year.
- Ban on privatisation of educational institutions.
- Land allotment to landless people.

=== Indian National Congress ===
The Indian National Congress organised a mega rally in Agartala on 29 December 2022 in which BJP MLA Diba Chandra Hrangkhawl along with 1 BJP & AITC leader joined the Congress. AICC in-charge for Tripura Ajoy Kumar said at the rally, "BJP has so many fathers but we have only one father of the nation - Mahatma Gandhi,". Kumar alleged that the BJP is giving money to young people to join their "Bike Bahini" to unleash panic and assault opposition party leaders and workers.

Manifesto

- Old pension scheme for government employees.
- Free 150 units of electricity.
- 50,000 new jobs will be created for agriculture labourers.
- Dearness allowance hike twice a year for government employees.
- Wages of tea cultivators and farmers will be increased based on consumer price index.
- 50,000 new government jobs will be created in the next 5 years.

=== Tipra Motha Party ===
TIPRA chief Pradyot Deb Barma in a rally in Agartala on 12 November 2022 said that 2023 is a fight to achieve a permanent constitutional solution in the form of Greater Tipraland. He slammed the BJP for its communal politics. He asserted that regional parties can bring about change and that his party wanted to give a constitutional solution, education, healthcare and jobs to all sections of people. Manikya also emphasized that since when the party had come to power in the TTAADC last year, it has focused on bring real development in the neglected regions.

Manifesto

On 4 February 2023, the Tipra Motha Party released its manifesto.

- Speedy public grievance redressal system for citizens.
- Hike in budget of TTAADC.
- 20,000 fresh jobs and opportunities
- Land allotment to deprived people.
- Setting up of a Tribal University, Agriculture University, Sports University and Buddhist University.
- Resolution against Citizenship Amendment Act in state assembly.
- Socio-economic survey of all tribes.
- Maharani Kanchanprabha Devi Women Empowerment Scheme for small-scale micro industries for production of rignai, risa along with packaged food awareness campaign through state-run schemes.
- Rights for LGBTQ individuals.
- 30% subsidies for entrepreneurship.

== Incidents ==
Indian National Congress

On 18 January 2023, the Congress claimed 15 of its workers and functionaries were attacked in Jirania allegedly by BJP workers who pelted stones. The attacked included AICC state-incharge Ajoy Kumar and many others.

Tipra Motha Party

On 19 January 2023, TIPRA Motha worker Pranajit Namasudra died after being attacked by unidentified attackers in Dhalai. It has been reported that Namasudra and friends were travelling in a car through Bamancherra area when his agresssors stopped them then dragged him out and assaulted him. Five persons were arrested by police in relation to the incident.

== Surveys & Polls ==
Election Commission of India had banned opinion polls and exit polls from 14 February till 7:00 pm of 27 February 2023. Controversy erupted in Tripura on 27 February during the polling an exit poll was circulated in social media which favoured BJP, Congress leader Sudip Roy Barman asked ECI to probe and Tipra Motha Party leader Pradyot Bikram Manikya Deb Barma called the exit poll BJP-paid.

Polling agency				
Polling agency	NDA	SDF	TMP	Others
Zee News-Matrize	29–36	13–21	11–16	0–3
India Today-Axis My India	36–45	6–11	9–16	1
Times Now-ETG	21–27	18–24	12–17	1–2
India News-Jan Ki Baat	29–40	9–16	10–14	0–1
Poll of Polls (Average)	32	15	12	0
Actual Result	33	14	13	0

== Results ==
=== Results by alliance and party ===
Results
Alliance	Party	Popular vote			Seats		
Alliance	Party	Votes	%	±pp	Contested	Won	+/−
NDA	Bharatiya Janata Party	985,797	38.97	▼4.62	55	32	▼4
NDA	Indigenous People's Front of Tripura	31,838	1.26	▼6.12	6	1	▼7
NDA	Total	1,017,635	40.23	▼10.78	60	33	▼11
SDF	Communist Party of India (Marxist)	622,829	24.62	▼17.6	43	11	▼5
SDF	Indian National Congress	216,637	8.56	▲6.77	13	3	▲3
SDF	All India Forward Bloc	26,138	1.03	▲0.47	1	0	Steady
SDF	Revolutionary Socialist Party	17,007	0.67	▼0.08	1	0	Steady
SDF	Independent	16,558	0.65	N/A	1	0	N/A
SDF	Communist Party of India	12,063	0.48	▼0.34	1	0	Steady
SDF	Total	911,232	36.01	▼10.08	60	14	▼2
None	Tipra Motha Party	498,182	19.69	▲19.7	42	13	New
None	Trinamool Congress	22,316	0.88	▲0.58	28	0	Steady
None	Independents	40279	1.6	TBD		0	Steady
None	Others		0.23	TBD		0	Steady
None	NOTA	34,449	1.36	▲0.33			
None	Total	2,495,210	100%				
Valid votes		2,495,210					
Invalid votes							
Votes cast/ turnout		2,537,769	89.83%				
Abstentions							
Registered voters		2,824,928					

=== Results by district ===
District	Seats			
District	Seats	NDA	SDF	TMP
West Tripura	14	7	5	2
Sipahijala	9	4	2	3
Khowai	6	3	1	2
Gomati	7	5	—N/a	2
South Tripura	7	4	3	—N/a
Dhalai	6	3	—N/a	3
Unakoti	4	3	1	—N/a
North Tripura	7	4	2	1
Total	60	33	14	13

=== Results by constituency ===
District	Constituency		Winner				Runner-up				Margin
District	No.	Name	Candidate	Party	Votes	%	Candidate	Party	Votes	%	Margin
West Tripura	1	Simna (ST)	Brishaketu Debbarma	TMP	22,757	64.89	Kumodh Debbarma	CPI(M)	5,811	16.57	16,946
West Tripura	2	Mohanpur	Ratan Lal Nath	BJP	19,663	45.34	Tapas Dey	TMP	12,278	28.31	7,385
West Tripura	3	Bamutia (SC)	Nayan Sarkar	CPI(M)	20,119	46.39	Krishnadhan Das	BJP	18,093	41.72	2,026
West Tripura	4	Barjala (SC)	Sudip Sarkar	CPI(M)	21,486	50.93	Dilip Kumar Das	BJP	19,697	46.69	1,789
West Tripura	5	Khayerpur	Ratan Chakraborty	BJP	22,453	47.48	Pabitra Kar	CPI(M)	18,343	38.79	4,110
West Tripura	6	Agartala	Sudip Roy Barman	INC	26,435	57.35	Papiya Dutta	BJP	18,273	39.64	8,162
West Tripura	7	Ramnagar	Surajit Datta	BJP	17,455	46.20	Purushottam Roy Barman	IND	16,558	43.83	897
West Tripura	8	Town Bordowali	Manik Saha	BJP	19,586	49.77	Ashish Kumar Saha	INC	18,329	46.60	1,257
West Tripura	9	Banamalipur	Gopal Chandra Roy	INC	17,128	49.58	Rajib Bhattacharjee	BJP	15,759	45.61	1,369
West Tripura	10	Majlishpur	Sushanta Chowdhury	BJP	21,349	46.80	Sanjoy Das	CPI(M)	16,177	35.46	5,172
West Tripura	11	Mandaibazar (ST)	Swapna Debbarma	TMP	28,726	66.35	Radhacharan Debbarma	CPI(M)	7,077	16.35	21,649
Sipahijala	12	Takarjala (ST)	Biswajit Kalai	TMP	34,717	86.81	Bidhan Debbarma	IPFT	2,262	5.66	32,455
West Tripura	13	Pratapgarh (SC)	Ramu Das	CPI(M)	26,422	49.61	Rebati Mohan Das	BJP	24,336	45.70	2,086
West Tripura	14	Badharghat (SC)	Mina Rani Sarkar	BJP	27,427	48.94	Partha Ranjan Sarkar	AIFB	26,138	46.64	1,289
Sipahijala	15	Kamalasagar	Antara Sarkar Deb	BJP	19,052	47.39	Hiranmay Debnath	CPI(M)	17,308	43.06	1,744
Sipahijala	16	Bishalgarh	Sushanta Deb	BJP	22,314	48.52	Partha Pratim Majumder	CPI(M)	20,988	45.64	1,326
Sipahijala	17	Golaghati (ST)	Manab Debbarma	TMP	19,800	50.79	Himani Debbarma	BJP	10,602	27.20	9,198
West Tripura	18	Suryamaninagar	Ram Prasad Paul	BJP	24,991	49.92	Susanta Chakraborty	INC	23,083	46.11	1,908
Sipahijala	19	Charilam (ST)	Subodh Deb Barma	TMP	13,657	37.34	Jishnu Dev Varma	BJP	12,799	34.99	858
Sipahijala	20	Boxanagar	Samsul Haque	CPI(M)	19,404	50.34	Tafajjal Hossain	BJP	14,555	37.76	4,849
Sipahijala	21	Nalchar (SC)	Kishor Barman	BJP	20,836	49.95	Tapan Chandra Das	CPI(M)	18,452	44.24	2,384
Sipahijala	22	Sonamura	Shyamal Chakraborty	CPI(M)	20,039	50.47	Debabrata Bhattacharjee	BJP	17,624	44.39	2,415
Sipahijala	23	Dhanpur	Pratima Bhoumik	BJP	19,148	42.25	Kaushik Chanda	CPI(M)	15,648	34.53	3,500
Khowai	24	Ramchandraghat (ST)	Ranjit Debbarma	TMP	23,143	60.87	Ranjit Debbarma	CPI(M)	6,941	18.26	16,202
Khowai	25	Khowai	Nirmal Biswas	CPI(M)	19,696	49.73	Subrata Majumdar	BJP	18,656	47.10	1,040
Khowai	26	Asharambari (ST)	Animesh Debbarma	TMP	23,838	66.56	Jayanti Deb Barma	IPFT	5,510	15.38	18,328
Khowai	27	Kalyanpur-Pramodnagar	Pinaki Das Chowdhury	BJP	17,903	43.59	Manihar Debbarma	TMP	11,290	27.49	6,613
Khowai	28	Teliamura	Kalyani Saha Roy	BJP	16,755	42.10	Ashok Kumar Baidya	INC	12,603	31.67	4,152
Khowai	29	Krishnapur (ST)	Bikash Debbarma	BJP	13,800	39.97	Mahendra Debbarma	TMP	11,162	32.33	2,638
Gomati	30	Bagma (ST)	Ram Pada Jamatia	BJP	19,482	38.74	Purna Chandra Jamatia	TMP	17,399	34.60	2,083
Gomati	31	Radhakishorpur	Pranajit Singha Roy	BJP	24,421	56.07	Srikanta Datta	RSP	17,007	39.05	7,414
Gomati	32	Matarbari	Abhishek Debroy	BJP	25,494	51.06	Pranajit Roy	INC	16,453	32.95	9,041
Gomati	33	Kakraban-Salgarh (SC)	Jitendra Majumder	BJP	23,625	48.17	Ratan Bhowmik	CPI(M)	18,574	37.87	5,051
South Tripura	34	Rajnagar (SC)	Swapna Majumder	BJP	20,849	48.07	Sudhan Das	CPI(M)	19,514	45.00	1,335
South Tripura	35	Belonia	Dipankar Sen	CPI(M)	20,016	48.27	Goutam Sarkar	BJP	19,613	47.30	403
South Tripura	36	Santirbazar (ST)	Pramod Reang	BJP	18,709	40.04	Harendra Reang	TMP	14,615	31.28	4,094
South Tripura	37	Hrishyamukh	Asoke Chandra Mitra	CPI(M)	19,986	46.37	Dipayan Choudhury	BJP	18,568	43.08	1,418
South Tripura	38	Jolaibari (ST)	Sukla Charan Noatia	IPFT	17,621	38.54	Debendra Tripura	CPI(M)	17,246	37.72	375
South Tripura	39	Manu (ST)	Mailafru Mog	BJP	15,469	34.50	Pravat Chowdhury	CPI(M)	14,922	33.28	547
South Tripura	40	Sabroom	Jitendra Chaudhury	CPI(M)	21,801	49.02	Sankar Roy	BJP	21,405	48.13	396
Gomati	41	Ampinagar (ST)	Pathan Lal Jamatia	TMP	21,525	57.03	Patal Kanya Jamatia	BJP	9,339	24.74	12,186
Gomati	42	Amarpur	Ranjit Das	BJP	17,989	44.21	Parimal Debnath	CPI(M)	13,395	32.92	4,594
Gomati	43	Karbook (ST)	Sanjoy Manik Tripura	TMP	16,647	44.88	Ashim Kumar Tripura	BJP	12,200	32.89	4,447
Dhalai	44	Raima Valley (ST)	Nandita Debbarma	TMP	19,269	40.66	Bikash Chakma	BJP	15,827	33.40	3,442
Dhalai	45	Kamalpur	Manoj Kanti Deb	BJP	18,287	45.16	Rubi Ghosh	INC	13,027	32.17	5,260
Dhalai	46	Surma (SC)	Swapna Das Paul	BJP	17,313	40.30	Anjan Das	CPI(M)	12,475	29.04	4,838
Dhalai	47	Ambassa (ST)	Chittaranjan Debbarma	TMP	15,317	33.27	Suchitra Debbarma	BJP	14,824	32.19	493
Dhalai	48	Karamcherra (ST)	Paul Dangshu	TMP	20,496	52.73	Braja Lal Tripura	BJP	9,901	25.47	10,595
Dhalai	49	Chawamanu (ST)	Sambhu Lal Chakma	BJP	16,644	41.85	Hangsa Kumar Tripura	TMP	13,745	34.56	2,899
Unakoti	50	Pabiachhara (SC)	Bhagaban Das	BJP	19,542	44.46	Satyaban Das	INC	19,134	43.53	408
Unakoti	51	Fatikroy (SC)	Sudhangshu Das	BJP	19,570	49.96	Subrata Das	CPI(M)	14,458	36.91	5,112
Unakoti	52	Chandipur	Tinku Roy	BJP	17,395	42.68	Krishnendu Choudhury	CPI(M)	16,818	41.26	577
Unakoti	53	Kailashahar	Birajit Sinha	INC	25,300	59.62	Moboshor Ali	BJP	15,614	36.80	9,686
North Tripura	54	Kadamtala-Kurti	Islam Uddin	CPI(M)	20,012	49.65	Dilip Tanti	BJP	18,120	44.95	1,892
North Tripura	55	Bagbassa	Jadab Lal Debnath	BJP	18,905	47.41	Bijita Nath	CPI(M)	17,444	43.74	1,461
North Tripura	56	Dharmanagar	Biswa Bandhu Sen	BJP	18,684	49.35	Chayan Bhattacharya	INC	17,586	46.45	1,098
North Tripura	57	Jubarajnagar	Sailendra Chandra Nath	CPI(M)	19,386	49.29	Malina Debnath	BJP	19,090	48.54	296
North Tripura	58	Panisagar	Binay Bhushan Das	BJP	15,745	41.61	Sital Das	CPI(M)	13,247	35.01	2,498
North Tripura	59	Pencharthal (ST)	Santana Chakma	BJP	17,781	45.50	Sadhan Kumar Chakma	CPI(M)	9,808	25.10	7,973
North Tripura	60	Kanchanpur (ST)	Philip Kumar Reang	TMP	15,413	36.44	Rajendra Reang	CPI(M)	10,522	24.88	4,891

== Government formation ==
Incumbent Chief Minister Manik Saha gave resignation to Governor Satyadev Narayan Arya and staked claim new government with support of 33 MLAs (32 BJP and 1 IPFT).

== Aftermath ==
After the poll results, violent attacks were unleashed on the workers of Left Front and Congress, allegedly by BJP. The CPI(M) demanded a judicial inquiry into the violence and also wrote to the National Human Rights Commission (NHRC) seeking intervention in the matter. Partido Comunista Português expressed its solidarity with CPI(M), CPI and other democratic and progressive forces in Tripura. A delegation composed of Member of Parliaments from CPI(M), CPI and Congress visited Tripura on 10 March 2023 and met with the affected families and administration officials to assess the situation on the ground.

== See also ==
- 2023 elections in India
