= Sankar Roy (politician) =

Indian politician (born 1957)

Member of Tripura Legislative Assembly
- In office 2018–2023
- Preceded by: Rita Kar
- Succeeded by: Jitendra Chaudhury
- Constituency: Sabroom

Personal details
- Born: May 22, 1957 (age 69) Sabroom
- Party: Bharatiya Janata Party
- Parent: Adhir Chandra Roy (father)

Sankar Roy is an Indian politician from Tripura. He served as the MLA of the Tripura Legislative Assembly from the Sabroom constituency from 2018 to 2023. In the 2023 Tripura Legislative Assembly election he lost re-election to CPI(M) candidate Jitendra Chaudhury.
