= Jitendra Majumder =

Indian politician (born 1954)

Jitendra Majumder (born 1954) is an Indian politician from Tripura. He is a member of the Tripura Legislative Assembly from Kakraban Salgarh Assembly constituency, which is reserved for Scheduled Caste community, in Gomati district. He won the 2023 Tripura Legislative Assembly election, representing the Bharatiya Janata Party.

== Early life and education ==
Majumder is from Kakraban. His late father Radha Krishna Majumder was a farmer. He completed his B.A. in 1978 at Ramthakur College, Agartala, which is affiliated with Calcutta University. He is into rubber cultivation and also runs his own business.

== Career ==
Majumder was elected as an MLA from Kakraban Salgarh Assembly constituency representing the Bharatiya Janata Party in the 2023 Tripura Legislative Assembly election. He polled 23,625 votes and defeated his nearest rival, Ratan Kr. Bhowmik of the Communist Party of India (Marxist), by a margin of 5,051 votes. In the 2018 Tripura Legislative Assembly election, he lost to Bhowmik of the Communist Party, by a margin of 3,767 votes. He polled 21,068 votes against Bhowmik, who got 24,835 votes.
