= Ratan Das =

Indian politician from Tripura

Member of the Tripura Legislative Assembly
- In office 2013–2018
- Preceded by: Surajit Datta
- Succeeded by: Surajit Datta
- Constituency: Ramnagar

Secretary of CPI(M) West Tripura
- Incumbent
- Assumed office 2025

Personal details
- Born: October 18, 1958 (age 67) Agartala
- Party: Communist Party of India (Marxist)
- Spouse: Sanhita Sengupta
- Parents: Abani Bhusan Das (father); Jyotsna Rani Das (mother)
- Education: M.A, B. Ed
- Occupation: Politician

Ratan Das (born 18 October 1958) is an Indian politician from the state of Tripura. Following the 2013 Tripura Legislative Assembly elections, he represented the Ramnagar constituency in West Tripura district in the Tripura Legislative Assembly. He was a member of the Tripura Legislative Assembly from 2013 to 2018. Since 2025, he has held the position of CPIM(M) West Tripura district secretary.
