= Mohanpur Assembly constituency =

Legislative Assembly constituency in Tripura State, India

Coordinates: 23.97°N 91.37°E

Mohanpur
- Constituency No. 2 for the Tripura Legislative Assembly

Constituency details
- Country: India
- Region: Northeast India
- State: Tripura
- District: West Tripura
- Lok Sabha constituency: Tripura West
- Established: 1967
- Total electors: 46,869
- Reservation: None

Member of Legislative Assembly
- 13th Tripura Legislative Assembly
- Incumbent Ratan Lal Nath
- Party: Bharatiya Janata Party
- Elected year: 2023

Mohanpur is one of the 60 Legislative Assembly constituencies of Tripura state in India. It is in West Tripura district and a part of Tripura West (Lok Sabha constituency).

== Members of Legislative Assembly ==
Year	Member	Party
1967	Pram D. Ranjan Dasgupta	Indian National Congress
1972	Radharaman Debnath	Communist Party of India
1977	Radharaman Debnath	Communist Party of India
1983	Dhirendra Chandra Debnath	Indian National Congress
1988	Dhirendra Chandra Debnath	Indian National Congress
1993	Ratan Lal Nath	Indian National Congress
1998	Ratan Lal Nath	Indian National Congress
2003	Ratan Lal Nath	Indian National Congress
2008	Ratan Lal Nath	Indian National Congress
2013	Ratan Lal Nath	Indian National Congress
2018	Ratan Lal Nath	Bharatiya Janata Party
2023	Ratan Lal Nath	Bharatiya Janata Party

== Election results ==
=== 2023 Assembly election ===
2023 Tripura Legislative Assembly election: Mohanpur
Party	Candidate	Votes	%	±%
BJP	Ratan Lal Nath	19,663	45.34%	▼9.08
TMP	Tapas Dey	12,278	28.31%	New
INC	Prasanta Sen Chowdhury	10,588	24.42%	▲23.59
Independent	Joy Kumar Deb	483	1.11%	New
NOTA	None of the Above	352	0.81%	▲0.05
Margin of victory		7,385	17.03%	▲4.52
Turnout		43,364	92.68%	▼2.09
Registered electors		46,869		▲7.19
BJP hold		Swing	▼9.08	

=== 2018 Assembly election ===
2018 Tripura Legislative Assembly election: Mohanpur
Party	Candidate	Votes	%	±%
BJP	Ratan Lal Nath	22,516	54.43%	▲53.39
CPI(M)	Subhas Chandra Debnath	17,340	41.91%	▼5.22
AMB	Haralal Debnath	347	0.84%	▼0.23
INC	Dilip Kumar Ghosh	342	0.83%	▼48.29
NOTA	None of the Above	315	0.76%	New
Margin of victory		5,176	12.51%	▲10.52
Turnout		41,370	93.53%	▲0.01
Registered electors		43,726		▲6.15
BJP gain from INC		Swing	▲5.30	

=== 2013 Assembly election ===
2013 Tripura Legislative Assembly election: Mohanpur
Party	Candidate	Votes	%	±%
INC	Ratan Lal Nath	19,143	49.12%	▼1.62
CPI(M)	Subhas Chandra Debnath	18,368	47.13%	▲1.19
IPFT	Mangalia Debbarma	640	1.64%	New
AMB	Bhupesh Debnath	417	1.07%	▼0.55
BJP	Dhirendra Chandra Debnath	403	1.03%	▼0.66
Margin of victory		775	1.99%	▼2.81
Turnout		38,971	94.80%	▲1.88
Registered electors		41,194		
INC hold		Swing	▼1.62	

=== 2008 Assembly election ===
2008 Tripura Legislative Assembly election: Mohanpur
Party	Candidate	Votes	%	±%
INC	Ratan Lal Nath	14,349	50.74%	▼6.21
CPI(M)	Subhas Chandra Debnath	12,993	45.95%	▲6.47
BJP	Dhirendra Chandra Debnath	478	1.69%	New
AMB	Joy Kumar Deb	458	1.62%	▲0.03
Margin of victory		1,356	4.80%	▼12.68
Turnout		28,278	92.85%	▲15.78
Registered electors		30,496		
INC hold		Swing	▼6.21	

=== 2003 Assembly election ===
2003 Tripura Legislative Assembly election: Mohanpur
Party	Candidate	Votes	%	±%
INC	Ratan Lal Nath	12,947	56.95%	▲2.41
CPI(M)	Sanjit Debnath	8,974	39.48%	▲0.18
AMB	Rakhal Raj Datta	362	1.59%	▲0.84
AITC	Dhirendra Chandra Debnath	230	1.01%	New
Independent	Dhiresh Chandra Das	219	0.96%	New
Margin of victory		3,973	17.48%	▲2.23
Turnout		22,732	76.99%	▼2.58
Registered electors		29,541		▲8.01
INC hold		Swing	▲2.41	

=== 1998 Assembly election ===
1998 Tripura Legislative Assembly election: Mohanpur
Party	Candidate	Votes	%	±%
INC	Ratan Lal Nath	11,864	54.54%	▲8.30
CPI(M)	Samir Chakrabarti	8,547	39.29%	▼6.67
BJP	Prabir Debbnath	940	4.32%	▲3.19
AMB	Samar Debnath	164	0.75%	▼1.50
Independent	Mongalia Debbarma	115	0.53%	New
Margin of victory		3,317	15.25%	▲14.96
Turnout		21,752	81.16%	▼0.80
Registered electors		27,350		▲4.57
INC hold		Swing	▲8.30	

=== 1993 Assembly election ===
1993 Tripura Legislative Assembly election: Mohanpur
Party	Candidate	Votes	%	±%
INC	Ratan Lal Nath	9,717	46.25%	▼4.80
CPI(M)	Akhil Chandra Debnath	9,657	45.96%	▲2.68
Independent	Binoy Debbarma	657	3.13%	New
AMB	Raknal Raj Datta	474	2.26%	New
BJP	Phani Bhusan Sutradhar	238	1.13%	New
Independent	Rabindra Debbarma	217	1.03%	New
Margin of victory		60	0.29%	▼7.48
Turnout		21,012	81.41%	▼2.48
Registered electors		26,155		▲25.51
INC hold		Swing	▼4.80	

=== 1988 Assembly election ===
1988 Tripura Legislative Assembly election: Mohanpur
Party	Candidate	Votes	%	±%
INC	Dhirendra Chandra Debnath	8,810	51.05%	▲5.98
CPI(M)	Radharaman Debnath	7,469	43.28%	▲2.43
Independent	Bhuban Bijoy Majumder	789	4.57%	New
JP	Phani Bhushan Debbarma	191	1.11%	New
Margin of victory		1,341	7.77%	▲3.55
Turnout		17,259	84.32%	▲3.34
Registered electors		20,839		▲13.64
INC hold		Swing	▲5.98	

=== 1983 Assembly election ===
1983 Tripura Legislative Assembly election: Mohanpur
Party	Candidate	Votes	%	±%
INC	Dhirendra Chandra Debnath	6,568	45.07%	▲41.81
CPI(M)	Radharaman Debnath	5,953	40.85%	▲4.33
Independent	Bhuban Bejoy Mazumder	2,053	14.09%	New
Margin of victory		615	4.22%	▼10.09
Turnout		14,574	80.89%	▼0.42
Registered electors		18,337		▲16.32
INC gain from CPI(M)		Swing		

=== 1977 Assembly election ===
1977 Tripura Legislative Assembly election: Mohanpur
Party	Candidate	Votes	%	±%
CPI(M)	Radharaman Debnath	4,599	36.51%	▼15.07
TPCC	Ambika Deb	2,797	22.21%	New
JP	Ratan Lal Deb Nath	2,481	19.70%	New
TUS	Basudha Ranjan Debbarma	2,085	16.55%	▲14.08
INC	Chandan Roy	410	3.26%	▼40.06
Proutist Bloc, India	Jtendra Chandra Deb	223	1.77%	New
Margin of victory		1,802	14.31%	▲6.05
Turnout		12,595	81.74%	▲14.66
Registered electors		15,764		▲24.02
CPI(M) hold		Swing	▼15.07	

=== 1972 Assembly election ===
1972 Tripura Legislative Assembly election: Mohanpur
Party	Candidate	Votes	%	±%
CPI(M)	Radharaman Debnath	4,277	51.58%	▲7.69
INC	Pram D. Ranjan Dasgupta	3,592	43.32%	▼11.95
TUS	Subodh Debbarma	205	2.47%	New
Independent	Nabachandra Debbarma	116	1.40%	New
Independent	Sachindra Debnath	53	0.64%	New
Independent	Chitta Ranjan Banik	49	0.59%	New
Margin of victory		685	8.26%	▼3.12
Turnout		8,292	66.05%	▼6.89
Registered electors		12,711		▼41.53
CPI(M) gain from INC		Swing	▼3.69	

=== 1967 Assembly election ===
1967 Tripura Legislative Assembly election: Mohanpur
Party	Candidate	Votes	%	±%
INC	Pram D. Ranjan Dasgupta	8,666	55.27%	New
CPI(M)	N. Chakravorty	6,882	43.89%	New
ABJS	B. R. D. Barwa	131	0.84%	New
Margin of victory		1,784	11.38%	
Turnout		15,679	74.00%	
Registered electors		21,739		
INC win (new seat)				

== See also ==
- List of constituencies of the Tripura Legislative Assembly
- West Tripura district
