= Prakash Chandra Das =

Indian politician

Prakash Chandra Das (born 27 November 1958) is an Indian politician from the northeastern state of Tripura. He is a former three time member of the Tripura Legislative Assembly from the Bamutia Assembly constituency representing the Indian National Congress all the three times. He also served as a minister in the INC-TUJS coalition government that governed the state of Tripura between 1988 and 1993.

He contested as an Indian National Congress candidate from the Bamutia constituency six times consecutively from 1988 to 2013, winning thrice, in 1988, 1998 and 2003.

== Early life ==
He was born on 27 November 1958. He is the son of the late Sadhan Chandra Das. He graduated with Bachelor of Arts degree in history from Maharaja Bir Bikram College, then under the University of Calcutta.

== Political activities ==
He became involved in student politics at a young age through the National Students' Union of India. He first contested as an Indian National Congress candidate in the 1988 assembly elections from the 3-Bamutia assembly constituency where he defeated the Communist Party of India (Marxist) candidate. He was also a minister in the INC-TUJS coalition that governed the state from 1988 to 1993. He won again in the same constituency in 1998 and in 2003. He served as vice president of the Pradesh Youth Congress, Tripura Pradesh Congress Committee General Secretary, member of All India Congress Committee. He was also the chairman of Tripura Pradesh Congress Committee SC Department from 2004 until he resigned from the party in June 2016. He became the vice president of the Tripura Pradesh Trinamool Congress. He quit Trinamool and joined the BJP on April, 2017. He rejoined the INC in March 2019. He returned to the BJP before the 2023 Tripura Legislative assembly elections.
