= Sanjoy Manik Tripura =

Indian politician

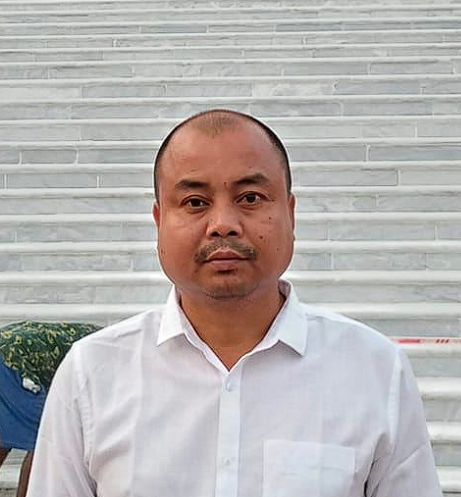

Member of the Tripura Legislative Assembly
- Incumbent
- Assumed office 2023
- Preceded by: Burba Mohan Tripura
- Constituency: Karbook (ST)

Personal details
- Born: 1979 (age 46–47) Karbook, Gomati district, Tripura, India
- Party: Tipra Motha Party
- Parent: Biswa Manik Tripura (father)
- Education: Class 12
- Alma mater: Nutan Bazar School, Amarpur

Sanjoy Manik Tripura (born 1979) is an Indian politician from Tripura. He is a member of the Tripura Legislative Assembly from the Karbook Assembly constituency, which is reserved for Scheduled Tribe community, in Gomati district. He was first elected in the 2023 Tripura Legislative Assembly election, representing the Tipra Motha Party.

== Early life and education ==
Tripura is from Karbrook, Gomati district, Tripura. He is the son of the late Biswa Manik Tripura. He completed Class 12 in 2002 at Nutan Bazar School, Amarpur, Gomati District.

== Career ==
Tripura won the Karbook Assembly constituency representing the Tipra Motha Party in the 2023 Tripura Legislative Assembly election. He polled 16,647 votes and defeated his nearest rival, Ashim Kumar Tripura of the Bharatiya Janata Party, by a margin of 4,447 votes.
