= Mailafru Mog =

Indian politician

Mailafru Mog (born 1971) is an Indian politician from Tripura. He is a member of the Tripura Legislative Assembly from the Manu Assembly constituency, which is reserved for Scheduled Tribes, in South Tripura district. He was first elected in the 2023 Tripura Legislative Assembly election, representing the Bharatiya Janata Party.

== Early life and education ==
Mog is from Manu, South Tripura district, Tripura. He is the son of Kejari Mog. He passed Class 8 in 1992 through Madhyamik examinations conducted by the Tripura Board of Secondary Education.

== Career ==
Mog was elected from the Manu Assembly constituency representing the Bharatiya Janata Party in the 2023 Tripura Legislative Assembly election. He polled 15,469 votes and defeated his nearest rival, Pravat Chowdhury of the Communist Party of India (Marxist), by a margin of 547 votes.
