= Bamutia Assembly constituency =

Legislative Assembly constituency in Tripura State, India

Coordinates: 23.96°N 91.29°E

Bamutia
- Constituency No. 03 for the Tripura Legislative Assembly

Constituency details
- Country: India
- Region: Northeast India
- State: Tripura
- District: West Tripura
- Lok Sabha constituency: Tripura West
- Established: 1972
- Total electors: 46,947
- Reservation: SC

Member of Legislative Assembly
- 13th Tripura Legislative Assembly
- Incumbent Nayan Sarkar
- Party: CPI(M)
- Elected year: 2023

Bamutia is one of the 60 Legislative Assembly constituencies of Tripura state in India. It is part of West Tripura district and is reserved for candidates belonging to the Scheduled Castes. It is also part of Tripura West (Lok Sabha constituency).

== Members of the Legislative Assembly ==
Election	Member	Party
1972	Prafulla Kumar Das	Indian National Congress
1977	Haricharan Sarkar	Communist Party of India
1983	Haricharan Sarkar	Communist Party of India
1988	Prakash Chandra Das	Indian National Congress
1993	Haricharan Sarkar	Communist Party of India
1998	Prakash Chandra Das	Indian National Congress
2003	Prakash Chandra Das	Indian National Congress
2008	Haricharan Sarkar	Communist Party of India
2013	Haricharan Sarkar	Communist Party of India
2018	Krishnadhan Das	Bharatiya Janata Party
2023	Nayan Sarkar	Communist Party of India

== Election results ==
=== 2023 Assembly election ===
2023 Tripura Legislative Assembly election: Bamutia
Party	Candidate	Votes	%	±%
CPI(M)	Nayan Sarkar	20,119	46.39%	New
BJP	Krishnadhan Das	18,093	41.72%	▼7.43
TMP	Nitai Sarkar	3,478	8.02%	New
AITC	Nihar Ranjan Sarkar	635	1.46%	New
NOTA	None of the Above	473	1.09%	▲0.24
Independent	Biplab Das	402	0.93%	New
Margin of victory		2,026	4.67%	▲2.28
Turnout		43,365	92.57%	▼2.82
Registered electors		46,947		▲9.75
CPI(M) gain from BJP		Swing	▼2.76	

=== 2018 Assembly election ===
2018 Tripura Legislative Assembly election: Bamutia
Party	Candidate	Votes	%	±%
BJP	Krishnadhan Das	20,014	49.15%	▲47.84
CPI(M)	Haricharan Sarkar	19,042	46.76%	▼5.59
INC	Swapanananda Das	402	0.99%	▼44.08
NOTA	None of the Above	348	0.85%	New
AMB	Bimal Das	276	0.68%	▼0.60
Margin of victory		972	2.39%	▼4.91
Turnout		40,720	94.29%	▼0.25
Registered electors		42,777		▲8.26
BJP gain from CPI(M)		Swing	▼3.20	

=== 2013 Assembly election ===
2013 Tripura Legislative Assembly election: Bamutia
Party	Candidate	Votes	%	±%
CPI(M)	Haricharan Sarkar	19,744	52.35%	▲0.29
INC	Prakash Chandra Das	16,994	45.06%	▲0.15
BJP	Bikram Bairagi	493	1.31%	▲0.20
AMB	Bimal Chandra Das	481	1.28%	▲0.18
Margin of victory		2,750	7.29%	▲0.14
Turnout		37,712	95.61%	▲1.72
Registered electors		39,513		
CPI(M) hold		Swing	▲0.29	

=== 2008 Assembly election ===
2008 Tripura Legislative Assembly election: Bamutia
Party	Candidate	Votes	%	±%
CPI(M)	Haricharan Sarkar	17,324	52.07%	▲4.03
INC	Prakash Chandra Das	14,944	44.91%	▼5.55
BJP	Samir Biswas	367	1.10%	New
AMB	Brajendra Das	366	1.10%	New
AITC	Papri Podder(Biswas)	271	0.81%	▼0.68
Margin of victory		2,380	7.15%	▲4.74
Turnout		33,272	93.91%	▲12.28
Registered electors		35,499		
CPI(M) gain from INC		Swing	▲1.61	

=== 2003 Assembly election ===
2003 Tripura Legislative Assembly election: Bamutia
Party	Candidate	Votes	%	±%
INC	Prakash Chandra Das	13,170	50.46%	▼2.38
CPI(M)	Haricharan Sarkar	12,539	48.04%	▲4.91
AITC	Achalmani Biswas	391	1.50%	New
Margin of victory		631	2.42%	▼7.29
Turnout		26,100	81.45%	▼0.45
Registered electors		32,046		▲16.81
INC hold		Swing		

=== 1998 Assembly election ===
1998 Tripura Legislative Assembly election: Bamutia
Party	Candidate	Votes	%	±%
INC	Prakash Chandra Das	11,871	52.84%	▲6.11
CPI(M)	Urmila Biswas	9,691	43.14%	▼8.15
BJP	Rash Mohan Sarkar	904	4.02%	▲2.89
Margin of victory		2,180	9.70%	▲5.15
Turnout		22,466	83.39%	▼0.57
Registered electors		27,434		▼0.69
INC gain from CPI(M)		Swing		

=== 1993 Assembly election ===
1993 Tripura Legislative Assembly election: Bamutia
Party	Candidate	Votes	%	±%
CPI(M)	Haricharan Sarkar	11,683	51.28%	▲2.84
INC	Prakash Chandra Das	10,645	46.73%	▼4.37
BJP	Bhajan Das	258	1.13%	New
Margin of victory		1,038	4.56%	▲1.90
Turnout		22,781	83.61%	▼3.15
Registered electors		27,625		▲32.68
CPI(M) gain from INC		Swing		

=== 1988 Assembly election ===
1988 Tripura Legislative Assembly election: Bamutia
Party	Candidate	Votes	%	±%
INC	Prakash Chandra Das	9,109	51.10%	▲3.01
CPI(M)	Dilip Kumar Das	8,636	48.45%	▼2.34
Margin of victory		473	2.65%	▼0.04
Turnout		17,825	86.75%	▲1.45
Registered electors		20,820		▲19.99
INC gain from CPI(M)		Swing		

=== 1983 Assembly election ===
1983 Tripura Legislative Assembly election: Bamutia
Party	Candidate	Votes	%	±%
CPI(M)	Haricharan Sarkar	7,417	50.79%	▲1.09
INC	Prafulla Kumar Das	7,023	48.09%	▲43.45
Independent	Subodh Chandra Das	164	1.12%	New
Margin of victory		394	2.70%	▼4.67
Turnout		14,604	85.47%	▲2.13
Registered electors		17,351		▲14.20
CPI(M) hold		Swing		

=== 1977 Assembly election ===
1977 Tripura Legislative Assembly election: Bamutia
Party	Candidate	Votes	%	±%
CPI(M)	Haricharan Sarkar	6,195	49.70%	▲11.42
TPCC	Parfulla Kumar Das	5,276	42.33%	New
INC	Jayram Kanda	578	4.64%	▼57.09
JP	Hari Lal Das	416	3.34%	New
Margin of victory		919	7.37%	▼16.08
Turnout		12,465	83.52%	▲11.76
Registered electors		15,194		▲35.56
CPI(M) gain from INC		Swing	▼12.02	

=== Assembly Election 1972 ===
1972 Tripura Legislative Assembly election: Bamutia
Party	Candidate	Votes	%	±%
INC	Prafulla Kumar Das	4,862	61.72%	New
CPI(M)	Brajendra Biswas	3,015	38.28%	New
Margin of victory		1,847	23.45%	
Turnout		7,877	71.40%	
Registered electors		11,208		
INC win (new seat)				

== See also ==
- List of constituencies of the Tripura Legislative Assembly
- West Tripura district
