= Sonamura Assembly constituency =

Legislative Assembly constituency in Tripura State, India

Coordinates: 23.48°N 91.27°E

Sonamura
- Constituency No. 22 for the Tripura Legislative Assembly

Constituency details
- Country: India
- Region: Northeast India
- State: Tripura
- District: Sipahijala
- Lok Sabha constituency: Tripura West
- Established: 1972
- Total electors: 44,540
- Reservation: None

Member of Legislative Assembly
- 13th Tripura Legislative Assembly
- Incumbent Shyamal Chakraborty
- Party: Communist Party of India (Marxist)
- Elected year: 2023

Sonamura is one of the 60 Legislative Assembly constituencies of Tripura state in India. It is in Sipahijala district and a part of West Tripura Lok Sabha constituency.

== Members of the Legislative Assembly ==
Election	Member	Party
1972	Debendra Kishore Chowdhury	Indian National Congress
1977	Subal Rudra	Communist Party of India
1983	Rashik Lal Roy	Indian National Congress
1988	Rashik Lal Roy	Indian National Congress
1993	Subal Rudra	Communist Party of India
1998	Subal Rudra	Communist Party of India
2003	Subal Rudra	Communist Party of India
2008	Subal Bhowmik	Indian National Congress
2013	Shyamal Chakraborty	Communist Party of India
2018	Shyamal Chakraborty	Communist Party of India
2023	Shyamal Chakraborty	Communist Party of India

== Election results ==
=== 2023 Assembly election ===
2023 Tripura Legislative Assembly election: Sonamura
Party	Candidate	Votes	%	±%
CPI(M)	Shyamal Chakraborty	20,039	50.47%	▼1.18
BJP	Debabrata Bhattacharjee	17,624	44.39%	▲1.93
AITC	Neel Kamal Saha	1,046	2.63%	▲1.51
NOTA	None of the Above	617	1.55%	▲0.75
Independent	Premjit Sinha	377	0.95%	New
Margin of victory		2,415	6.08%	▼3.11
Turnout		39,703	89.30%	▼3.12
Registered electors		44,540		▲10.12
CPI(M) hold		Swing	▼1.18	

=== 2018 Assembly election ===
2018 Tripura Legislative Assembly election: Sonamura
Party	Candidate	Votes	%	±%
CPI(M)	Shyamal Chakraborty	19,275	51.65%	▼0.56
BJP	Subal Bhowmik	15,843	42.46%	New
INC	Majibur Islam Majumdar	684	1.83%	▼45.96
AITC	Jasim Uddin	420	1.13%	New
NOTA	None of the Above	300	0.80%	New
Tripura Peoples Party	Ruhul Amin	231	0.62%	New
Margin of victory		3,432	9.20%	▲4.78
Turnout		37,317	90.95%	▼2.80
Registered electors		40,447		▲11.25
CPI(M) hold		Swing	▼0.56	

=== 2013 Assembly election ===
2013 Tripura Legislative Assembly election: Sonamura
Party	Candidate	Votes	%	±%
CPI(M)	Shyamal Chakraborty	18,043	52.21%	▲4.78
INC	Subal Bhowmik	16,517	47.79%	▼2.44
Margin of victory		1,526	4.42%	▲1.61
Turnout		34,560	95.13%	▲0.27
Registered electors		36,357		
CPI(M) gain from INC		Swing		

=== 2008 Assembly election ===
2008 Tripura Legislative Assembly election: Sonamura
Party	Candidate	Votes	%	±%
INC	Subal Bhowmik	14,837	50.24%	▲4.75
CPI(M)	Subal Rudra	14,008	47.43%	▼4.86
BJP	Swapan Chandra Saha	370	1.25%	New
CPI(ML)L	Julfu Mia	319	1.08%	▼0.08
Margin of victory		829	2.81%	▼4.00
Turnout		29,534	95.22%	▲9.10
Registered electors		31,157		
INC gain from CPI(M)		Swing	▼2.06	

=== 2003 Assembly election ===
2003 Tripura Legislative Assembly election: Sonamura
Party	Candidate	Votes	%	±%
CPI(M)	Subal Rudra	13,455	52.30%	▲2.07
INC	Sudhir Ranjan Majumder	11,704	45.49%	▼1.56
CPI(ML)L	Rajjab Ali	298	1.16%	New
JD(U)	Tutan Bhowmik(Chakraborty)	272	1.06%	New
Margin of victory		1,751	6.81%	▲3.63
Turnout		25,729	85.83%	▲0.39
Registered electors		30,025		▲18.08
CPI(M) hold		Swing	▲2.07	

=== 1998 Assembly election ===
1998 Tripura Legislative Assembly election: Sonamura
Party	Candidate	Votes	%	±%
CPI(M)	Subal Rudra	10,894	50.23%	▼3.99
INC	Subal Bhowmik	10,205	47.05%	▲7.20
BJP	Swapan Chandra Saha	590	2.72%	▲0.09
Margin of victory		689	3.18%	▼11.19
Turnout		21,689	86.91%	▲0.78
Registered electors		25,427		▲4.21
CPI(M) hold		Swing		

=== 1993 Assembly election ===
1993 Tripura Legislative Assembly election: Sonamura
Party	Candidate	Votes	%	±%
CPI(M)	Subal Rudra	11,181	54.22%	▲5.77
INC	Rashik Lal Roy	8,218	39.85%	▼11.46
Independent	Md. Mafizuddin	573	2.78%	New
BJP	Ratan Das	542	2.63%	New
Margin of victory		2,963	14.37%	▲11.50
Turnout		20,621	85.55%	▼3.68
Registered electors		24,399		▲24.07
CPI(M) gain from INC		Swing	▲2.90	

=== 1988 Assembly election ===
1988 Tripura Legislative Assembly election: Sonamura
Party	Candidate	Votes	%	±%
INC	Rashik Lal Roy	8,900	51.32%	▼0.23
CPI(M)	Subal Rudra	8,403	48.45%	▲1.45
Margin of victory		497	2.87%	▼1.68
Turnout		17,343	89.29%	▲1.70
Registered electors		19,665		▲20.71
INC hold		Swing		

=== 1983 Assembly election ===
1983 Tripura Legislative Assembly election: Sonamura
Party	Candidate	Votes	%	±%
INC	Rashik Lal Roy	7,264	51.55%	▲15.00
CPI(M)	Subal Rudra	6,623	47.00%	▼6.88
Independent	Sukumar Das	204	1.45%	New
Margin of victory		641	4.55%	▼12.77
Turnout		14,091	87.97%	▲4.17
Registered electors		16,291		▲11.70
INC gain from CPI(M)		Swing		

=== 1977 Assembly election ===
1977 Tripura Legislative Assembly election: Sonamura
Party	Candidate	Votes	%	±%
CPI(M)	Subal Rudra	6,469	53.88%	▲34.29
INC	Debendra Kishore Chowdhury	4,389	36.55%	▼18.89
JP	Abdul Kader Chowdhury	774	6.45%	New
TPCC	Arun Kumar Chakraborty	375	3.12%	New
Margin of victory		2,080	17.32%	▼13.15
Turnout		12,007	84.00%	▲18.38
Registered electors		14,584		▲54.82
CPI(M) gain from INC		Swing	▼1.57	

=== 1972 Assembly election ===
1972 Tripura Legislative Assembly election: Sonamura
Party	Candidate	Votes	%	±%
INC	Debendra Kishore Chowdhury	3,340	55.44%	New
Independent	Sultan Miah	1,504	24.97%	New
CPI(M)	Abdul Jabbar Bhuiya	1,180	19.59%	New
Margin of victory		1,836	30.48%	
Turnout		6,024	65.74%	
Registered electors		9,420		
INC win (new seat)				

== See also ==
- List of constituencies of the Tripura Legislative Assembly
- Sipahijala district
- Sonamura
- Tripura West (Lok Sabha constituency)
