= Karbook Assembly constituency =

Legislative Assembly constituency in Tripura State, India

Coordinates: 23.34°N 91.75°E

Karbook
- Constituency No. 43 for the Tripura Legislative Assembly

Constituency details
- Country: India
- Region: Northeast India
- State: Tripura
- District: Gomati
- Lok Sabha constituency: Tripura East
- Established: 2008
- Total electors: 40,656
- Reservation: ST

Member of Legislative Assembly
- 13th Tripura Legislative Assembly
- Incumbent Sanjoy Manik Tripura
- Party: TMP
- Alliance: NDA
- Elected year: 2023

Karbook is one of the 60 Legislative Assembly constituencies of Tripura state in India.

It is part of Gomati district and is reserved for candidates belonging to the Scheduled Tribes.

== Members of the Legislative Assembly ==
Election	Member	Party
2013	Priyamani Debbarma	Communist Party of India
2018	Burba Mohan Tripura	Bharatiya Janata Party
2023	Sanjoy Manik Tripura	Tipra Motha Party

== Election results ==
=== 2023 Assembly election ===
2023 Tripura Legislative Assembly election: Karbook
Party	Candidate	Votes	%	±%
TMP	Sanjoy Manik Tripura	16,647	44.88%	New
BJP	Ashim Kumar Tripura	12,200	32.89%	▼15.97
CPI(M)	Priyamani Debbarma	6,934	18.70%	▼27.68
AITC	Milton Chakma	683	1.84%	New
NOTA	None of the Above	625	1.69%	▲0.25
Margin of victory		4,447	11.99%	▲9.50
Turnout		37,089	91.35%	▼0.74
Registered electors		40,656		▲16.96
TMP gain from BJP		Swing	▼3.98	

=== 2018 Assembly election ===
2018 Tripura Legislative Assembly election: Karbook
Party	Candidate	Votes	%	±%
BJP	Burba Mohan Tripura	15,622	48.86%	▲47.87
CPI(M)	Priyamani Debbarma	14,825	46.37%	▼7.03
INC	Ram Bahadur Reang	461	1.44%	New
NOTA	None of the Above	458	1.43%	New
INPT	Janak Mani Tripura	216	0.68%	▼40.91
Tripura Peoples Party	Harish Reang	213	0.67%	New
NEIDP	Subal Debbarma	177	0.55%	New
Margin of victory		797	2.49%	▼9.32
Turnout		31,970	92.02%	▼1.89
Registered electors		34,761		▲12.23
BJP gain from CPI(M)		Swing	▼4.54	

=== 2013 Assembly election ===
2013 Tripura Legislative Assembly election: Karbook
Party	Candidate	Votes	%	±%
CPI(M)	Priyamani Debbarma	15,526	53.40%	New
INPT	Dharjaroy Tripura	12,091	41.59%	New
NCP	Mitu Chakma	351	1.21%	New
Independent	Charendra Reang	348	1.20%	New
BJP	Subal Debbarma	290	1.00%	New
IPFT	Satiram Reang	288	0.99%	New
Margin of victory		3,435	11.82%	
Turnout		29,073	94.17%	
Registered electors		30,973		
CPI(M) win (new seat)				

== See also ==
- List of constituencies of the Tripura Legislative Assembly
- Gomati district
