= Sudip Sarkar =

Indian politician

Member of the Tripura Legislative Assembly
- Incumbent
- Assumed office 8 September 2023
- Preceded by: Dilip Kumar Das
- Constituency: Barjala

Personal details
- Party: CPI(M)
- Education: Matriculation; Sukhamoy H.S. School (1993)

Sudip Sarkar is an Indian politician of Communist Party of India (Marxist) from Tripura. He is a Member of the Tripura Legislative Assembly, representing the Barjala Assembly constituency.

In the 2023 Tripura Legislative Assembly election, Sarkar won the election against the BJP's incumbent MLA Dilip Kumar Das.

Sarkar matriculated from Sukhamoy H.S. School in 1993.
