= Manu Assembly constituency =

Legislative Assembly constituency in Tripura State, India

Coordinates: 24°N 91.99°E

Manu
- Constituency No. 39 for the Tripura Legislative Assembly

Constituency details
- Country: India
- Region: Northeast India
- State: Tripura
- District: South Tripura
- Lok Sabha constituency: Tripura East
- Established: 1972
- Total electors: 47,741
- Reservation: ST

Member of Legislative Assembly
- 13th Tripura Legislative Assembly
- Incumbent Mailafru Mog
- Party: Bharatiya Janta Party
- Elected year: 2023

Manu is one of the 60 Legislative Assembly constituencies of Tripura state in India. It is in South Tripura district and is reserved for candidates belonging to the Scheduled Tribes. The current MLA is Mailafru Mog of BJP.

== Members of the Legislative Assembly ==
Election	Member	Party
1972	Hari Chanran Choudhrury	Indian National Congress
1977	Matahari Choudhury	Communist Party of India
1983	Angju Mog	Indian National Congress
1988	Angju Mog	Indian National Congress
1993	Jitendra Chaudhury	Communist Party of India
1998	Jitendra Chaudhury	Communist Party of India
2003	Jitendra Chaudhury	Communist Party of India
2008	Jitendra Chaudhury	Communist Party of India
2013	Jitendra Chaudhury	Communist Party of India
2014*	Pravat Chowdhury	Communist Party of India
2018	Pravat Chowdhury	Communist Party of India
2023	Mailafru Mog	Bharatiya Janata Party

*By-election

== Election results ==
=== 2023 Assembly election ===
2023 Tripura Legislative Assembly election: Manu
Party	Candidate	Votes	%	±%
BJP	Mailafru Mog	15,469	34.50%	New
CPI(M)	Pravat Chowdhury	14,922	33.28%	▼14.34
TMP	Dhananjoy Tripura	13,650	30.44%	New
NOTA	None of the Above	794	1.77%	▲0.58
Margin of victory		547	1.22%	▲0.75
Turnout		44,835	93.99%	▼1.20
Registered electors		47,741		▲11.29
BJP gain from CPI(M)		Swing	▼13.12	

=== 2018 Assembly election ===
2018 Tripura Legislative Assembly election: Manu
Party	Candidate	Votes	%	±%
CPI(M)	Pravat Chowdhury	19,432	47.62%	▼10.45
IPFT	Dhananjoy Tripura	19,239	47.15%	New
INC	Mongla Mog	819	2.01%	▼37.28
NOTA	None of the Above	485	1.19%	New
Independent	Kanchai Mog	483	1.18%	New
Margin of victory		193	0.47%	▼18.31
Turnout		40,804	94.35%	▼0.67
Registered electors		42,899		▲11.92
CPI(M) hold		Swing	▼10.45	

=== 2013 Assembly election ===
2013 Tripura Legislative Assembly election: Manu
Party	Candidate	Votes	%	±%
CPI(M)	Jitendra Chaudhury	21,320	58.07%	▲2.00
INC	Chandi Charan Tripura	14,424	39.29%	▼0.42
BJP	Thaiu Mog	971	2.64%	▲0.55
Margin of victory		6,896	18.78%	▲2.41
Turnout		36,715	96.01%	▲1.71
Registered electors		38,329		
CPI(M) hold		Swing		

=== 2008 Assembly election ===
2008 Tripura Legislative Assembly election: Manu
Party	Candidate	Votes	%	±%
CPI(M)	Jitendra Chaudhury	21,100	56.07%	▲0.77
INC	Thaikhai Mog	14,940	39.70%	New
Independent	Kirat Bahan Tripura	800	2.13%	New
BJP	Mrathaiong Mog	789	2.10%	▼0.37
Margin of victory		6,160	16.37%	▲3.29
Turnout		37,629	94.45%	▲9.09
Registered electors		39,999		
CPI(M) hold		Swing	▲0.77	

=== 2003 Assembly election ===
2003 Tripura Legislative Assembly election: Manu
Party	Candidate	Votes	%	±%
CPI(M)	Jitendra Chaudhury	17,358	55.31%	▼0.49
INPT	Chandan Tripura	13,253	42.23%	New
BJP	Chandi Tripura	773	2.46%	▲1.24
Margin of victory		4,105	13.08%	▲0.25
Turnout		31,384	85.00%	▲0.98
Registered electors		36,927		▲6.62
CPI(M) hold		Swing		

=== 1998 Assembly election ===
1998 Tripura Legislative Assembly election: Manu
Party	Candidate	Votes	%	±%
CPI(M)	Jitendra Chaudhury	16,236	55.80%	▲0.87
INC	Joykishore Tripura	12,504	42.97%	▼2.09
BJP	Chandi Tripura	357	1.23%	New
Margin of victory		3,732	12.83%	▲2.96
Turnout		29,097	85.36%	▲0.52
Registered electors		34,635		▲6.71
CPI(M) hold		Swing		

=== 1993 Assembly election ===
1993 Tripura Legislative Assembly election: Manu
Party	Candidate	Votes	%	±%
CPI(M)	Jitendra Chaudhury	14,886	54.93%	▲5.53
INC	Angju Mog	12,212	45.07%	▼5.05
Margin of victory		2,674	9.87%	▲9.15
Turnout		27,098	85.01%	▼4.73
Registered electors		32,458		▲21.29
CPI(M) gain from INC		Swing		

=== 1988 Assembly election ===
1988 Tripura Legislative Assembly election: Manu
Party	Candidate	Votes	%	±%
INC	Angju Mog	11,832	50.12%	▼5.08
CPI(M)	Jitendra Kumar Chowdhury	11,663	49.40%	▲4.60
Margin of victory		169	0.72%	▼9.69
Turnout		23,608	89.39%	▲6.11
Registered electors		26,760		▲17.71
INC hold		Swing		

=== 1983 Assembly election ===
1983 Tripura Legislative Assembly election: Manu
Party	Candidate	Votes	%	±%
INC	Angju Mog	10,304	55.20%	▲20.64
CPI(M)	Jitendra Kumar Chowdhury	8,362	44.80%	▲2.14
Margin of victory		1,942	10.40%	▲2.31
Turnout		18,666	83.50%	▲5.12
Registered electors		22,733		▲18.65
INC gain from CPI(M)		Swing		

=== 1977 Assembly election ===
1977 Tripura Legislative Assembly election: Manu
Party	Candidate	Votes	%	±%
CPI(M)	Matahari Chowdhury	6,292	42.65%	▲6.71
INC	Angju Mog	5,098	34.56%	▼19.69
TUS	Madhu Sudan Mog	1,549	10.50%	New
JP	Mongfruchai Chowdhury	1,498	10.16%	New
TPCC	Suibai Chowdhury	314	2.13%	New
Margin of victory		1,194	8.09%	▼10.20
Turnout		14,751	78.90%	▲11.37
Registered electors		19,159		▲43.17
CPI(M) gain from INC		Swing	▼11.59	

=== 1972 Assembly election ===
1972 Tripura Legislative Assembly election: Manu
Party	Candidate	Votes	%	±%
INC	Hari Chanran Choudhrury	4,764	54.25%	New
CPI(M)	Thaingya Mog	3,157	35.95%	New
Independent	Suibai Chowdhury	447	5.09%	New
CPI	Angia Mag	414	4.71%	New
Margin of victory		1,607	18.30%	
Turnout		8,782	67.92%	
Registered electors		13,382		
INC win (new seat)				

== See also ==
- South Tripura district
- List of constituencies of the Tripura Legislative Assembly
