= Kakraban–Salgarh Assembly constituency =

Legislative Assembly constituency in Tripura state, India

Coordinates: 23.83°N 91.29°E

Kakraban-Salgarh
- Constituency No. 33 for the Tripura Legislative Assembly

Constituency details
- Country: India
- Region: Northeast India
- State: Tripura
- District: Gomati
- Lok Sabha constituency: Tripura West
- Established: 2008
- Total electors: 54,358
- Reservation: SC

Member of Legislative Assembly
- 13th Tripura Legislative Assembly
- Incumbent Jitendra Majumder
- Party: Bharatiya Janata Party
- Elected year: 2023

Kakraban-Salgarh is one of the 60 Legislative Assembly constituencies of Tripura state in India.

It comprises all of Kakraban tehsil and Mirja tehsils as well as parts of Garji tehsil, Jamjuri tehsil and Salgarah tehsil, all in Gomati district. It is reserved for candidates belonging to the Scheduled Castes. As of 2023, it is represented by Jitendra Majumder of the Bharatiya Janata Party.

== Members of the Legislative Assembly ==
Election	Name	Party
2013	Ratan Bhowmik	Communist Party of India
2018	Ratan Bhowmik	Communist Party of India
2023	Jitendra Majumder	Bharatiya Janata Party

== Election results ==
=== 2018 ===
Tripura Legislative Assembly Election, 2018: Kakraban-Salgarh
Party	Candidate	Votes	%	±%
CPI(M)	Ratan Bhowmik	24,835	53.22	
BJP	Jitendra Majumder	21,068	45.15	
NOTA	None of the Above	762	1.63	
Majority				
Turnout		46,665	92.50	
CPI(M) hold		Swing		

== See also ==
- List of constituencies of the Tripura Legislative Assembly
- Gomati district
