= Belonia Assembly constituency =

Legislative Assembly constituency in Tripura State, India

Coordinates: 23.25°N 91.45°E

Belonia
- Constituency No. 35 for the Tripura Legislative Assembly
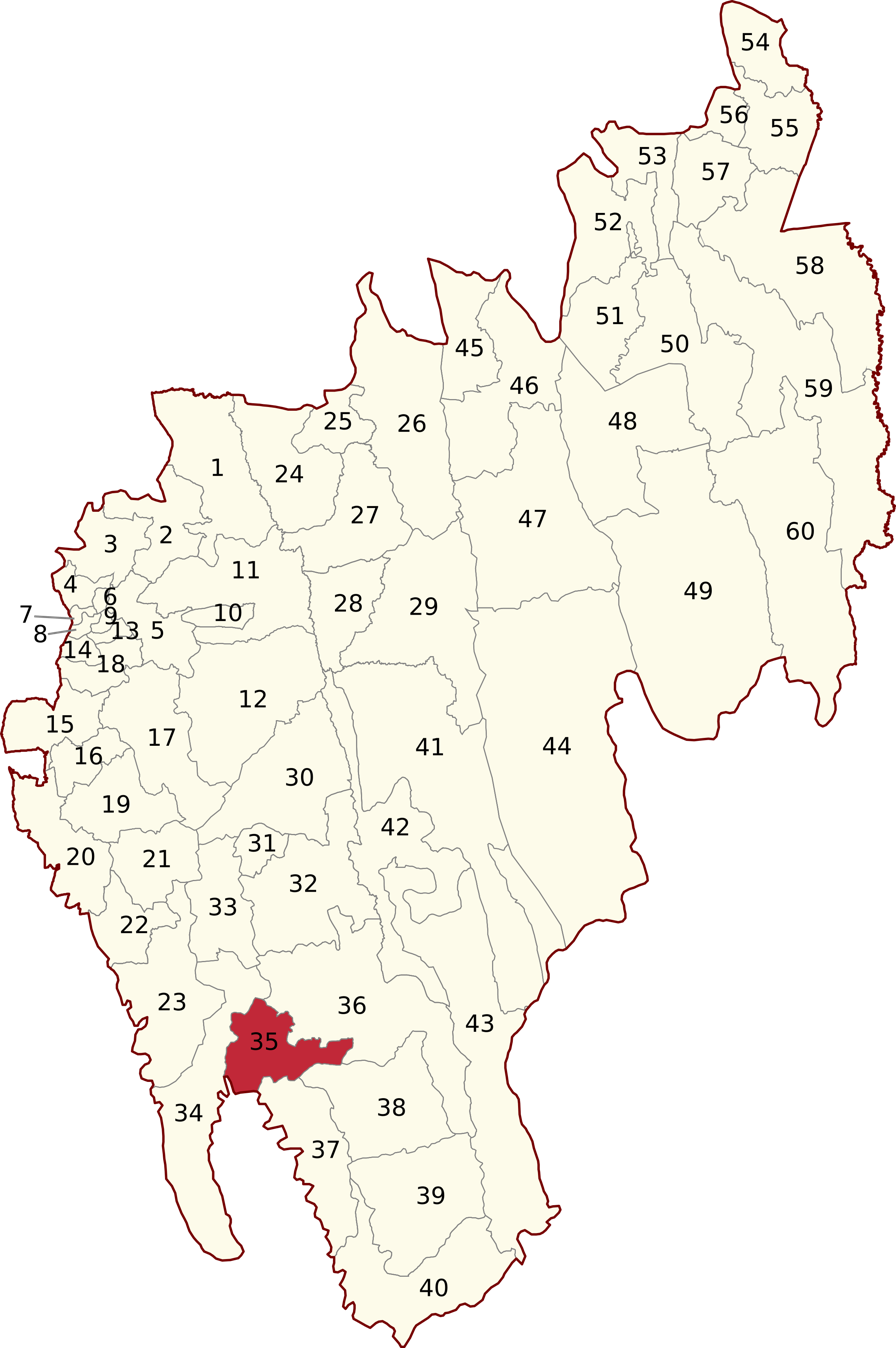
- Belonia constituency within Tripura

Constituency details
- Country: India
- Region: Northeast India
- State: Tripura
- District: South Tripura
- Lok Sabha constituency: Tripura West
- Established: 1967
- Total electors: 44,741
- Reservation: None

Member of Legislative Assembly
- 13th Tripura Legislative Assembly
- Incumbent Dipankar Sen
- Party: Communist Party of India (Marxist)
- Elected year: 2023
- Preceded by: Arun Chandra Bhaumik

Belonia is one of the 60 Legislative Assembly constituencies of Tripura state in India.

It is part of South Tripura district and is centered around the town of Belonia. As of 2023, Dipankar Sen is the current representative of this constituency. His term is expected to last until 2028.

== History ==
The constituency of Belonia was created, in 1967, for the newly created 30-seat Legislative Assembly of the union territory of Tripura, by the Government Of Union Territories Act, 1963. Later, in 1971, Tripura was converted from a union territory to a state, by the North-Eastern Areas (Reorganisation) Act, 1971, which increased the number of constituencies in Tripura to 60, hence requiring major boundary changes to the constituencies.

By the last delimitation, carried out in 2005, the constituency consists of all of Belonia and Maichhara tehsils and parts of Barpathari, Baikhora and Rajapur tehsils.

== Members of the Legislative Assembly ==
Year	Member	Party
1967	U. K. Roy	Indian National Congress
Major Boundary Changes
1972	Jitendra Lal Das	Communist Party of India
1977	Jyotirmoy Das	Communist Party of India
1983	Manoranjan Majumder	Independent
1988	Amal Mallik	Indian National Congress
1993	Amal Mallik	Indian National Congress
1998	Basudev Majumder	Communist Party of India
2003	Basudev Majumder	Communist Party of India
2008	Basudev Majumder	Communist Party of India
2013	Basudev Majumder	Communist Party of India
2018	Arun Chandra Bhaumik	Bharatiya Janata Party
2023	Dipankar Sen	Communist Party of India

== Election results ==
=== 20th century ===
==== 1967 ====
Tripura Legislative Assembly Election, 1967: Belonia
Party	Candidate	Votes	%	±%
INC	U.K. Roy	10,502	60.05	N/A
CPI	J.L. Das	6,691	38.26	N/A
Independent	J.C.D. Mahajan	297	1.70	N/A
Majority		3,811	21.79	N/A
Turnout		17,490	73.00	N/A
INC win (new seat)				

==== 1972 ====
Tripura Legislative Assembly Election, 1972: Belonia
Party	Candidate	Votes	%	±%
CPI	Jitendra Lal Das	3,992	43.57	▲5.31
INC	Suresh Chandra Choudhury	3,627	39.59	N/A
CPI(M)	Sudhangsu Bimal Dutta	1,543	16.84	N/A
Majority		365	3.98	▼17.81
Turnout		9,162	58.79	▼14.21
CPI gain from INC		Swing		

==== 1977 ====
Tripura Legislative Assembly Election, 1977: Belonia
Party	Candidate	Votes	%	±%
CPI(M)	Jyotirmoy Das	5,460	41.65	N/A
INC	Manoranjan Majumder	5,341	40.74	N/A
JP	Manik Lal Choudhury	1,176	8.97	N/A
CPI	Jitendra Lal Das	841	6.41	▼37.16
Independent	Ramesh Chandra Das	292	2.23	N/A
Majority		119	0.91	▼3.07
Turnout		13,358	81.72	▲22.93
CPI(M) gain from CPI		Swing		

==== 1983 ====
Tripura Legislative Assembly Election, 1983: Belonia
Party	Candidate	Votes	%	±%
Independent	Manoranjan Majumder	8,081	50.75	▲10.01
CPI	Jitendra Lal Das	7,657	48.08	▲41.67
Independent	Madan Mohan Baidya	153	0.96	N/A
Independent	Anil Saha	33	0.21	N/A
Majority		424	2.66	▲1.75
Turnout		15,924	87.18	▲5.46
Independent gain from CPI(M)		Swing		

==== 1988 ====
Tripura Legislative Assembly Election, 1988: Belonia
Party	Candidate	Votes	%	±%
INC	Amal Mallik	10,227	51.96	N/A
CPI	Jitendra Lal Das	9,314	47.32	▼0.76
BJP	Anil Saha	97	0.49	▲0.28
Independent	Ratan Roy	45	0.23	N/A
Majority		913	4.63	▲1.97
Turnout		19,683	88.52	▲1.34
INC gain from Independent		Swing		

==== 1993 ====
Tripura Legislative Assembly Election, 1993: Belonia
Party	Candidate	Votes	%	±%
INC	Amal Mallik	14,985	62.30	▲10.34
CPI	Sunil Baran Das Gupta	8,430	35.05	N/A
BJP	Keshab Ch. Sarkar	232	0.96	N/A
Independent	Amulya Bhowmik	110	0.46	N/A
Independent	Madan Daidya	98	0.41	N/A
Independent	Pulin Behari Chowdhury	92	0.38	N/A
Independent	Pabitra Roy	64	0.27	N/A
Independent	Sital Datta	42	0.17	N/A
Majority		6,555	27.25	▲22.62
Turnout		24,053	86.92	▼1.60
INC hold		Swing		

==== 1998 ====
Tripura Legislative Assembly Election, 1998: Belonia
Party	Candidate	Votes	%	±%
CPI(M)	Basudev Majumder	12,409	52.21	N/A
INC	Amal Mallik	10,552	44.40	▼17.90
BJP	Jagadish Ch. Bose	762	3.21	N/A
Independent	Madan Baidya	44	0.19	▼0.22
Majority		1857	7.81	▼19.44
Turnout		23767	87.63	▲0.71
CPI(M) gain from INC		Swing		

=== 21st century ===
==== 2003 ====
Tripura Legislative Assembly Election, 2003: Belonia
Party	Candidate	Votes	%	±%
CPI(M)	Basudev Majumder	15,419	59.13	▲6.92
INC	Babul Majumder	9,469	36.31	N/A
AITC	Amal Mallik	673	2.58	▼41.82
NCP	Bimal Krishna Nag	292	1.12	N/A
LJP	Haripada Chakrabarty	223	0.86	N/A
Majority		5950	22.82	▲15.01
Turnout		26076	84.65	▼2.98
CPI(M) hold		Swing		

==== 2008 ====
Tripura Legislative Assembly Election, 2008: Belonia
Party	Candidate	Votes	%	±%
CPI(M)	Basudev Majumder	15,971	50.47	▼8.66
INC	Amal Mallik	14,652	46.30	▲43.72
CPI(ML)L	Babul Chandra Pal	333	1.05	N/A
AITC	Sudeb Sen Choudhury	294	0.93	N/A
BJP	Keshab Chandra Sarkar	293	0.93	N/A
Independent	Ratan Roy	102	0.32	N/A
Majority		1312	4.17	▼18.65
Turnout		31645	95.0	▲10.35
CPI(M) hold		Swing		

==== 2013 ====
Tripura Legislative Assembly Election, 2013: Belonia
Party	Candidate	Votes	%	±%
CPI(M)	Basudev Majumder	20,585	55.60	▲5.13
INC	Amal Mallik	15,761	42.57	▼3.73
Independent	Gouri Sankar Nandi	352	0.95	N/A
CPI(ML)L	Babul Chandra Paul	324	0.88	▼0.17
Majority		4824	13.03	▲8.86
Turnout		37022	95.61	▲0.61
CPI(M) hold		Swing		

==== 2018 ====
Tripura Legislative Assembly Election, 2018: Belonia
Party	Candidate	Votes	%	±%
BJP	Arun Chandra Bhaumik	19,307	48.01	N/A
CPI(M)	Basudev Majumder	18,554	46.14	▼9.46
INC	Bholanath Dhar	399	1.01	N/A
AITC	Prasanta Sen	323	0.82	N/A
Independent	Gauri Sankar Nandi	157	0.408	▼0.54
Independent	Amalendu Banik	124	0.326	N/A
NOTA	None of the Above	378	0.96	N/A
Majority		753	1.72	▼11.31
Turnout		39,275	89.95	▼5.66
BJP gain from CPI(M)		Swing		

== See also ==
- List of constituencies of the Tripura Legislative Assembly
- South Tripura district
