= Matahari Choudhury =

Indian politician

Member of Tripura Legislative Assembly
- In office 1977–1983
- Preceded by: Hari Chanran Choudhrury
- Succeeded by: Angju Mog
- Constituency: Manu

Personal details
- Born: South Tripura, Tripura, India
- Party: Communist Party of India (Marxist)
- Spouse: Hematara Choudhury

Matahari Choudhury was an Indian politician from Tripura. He was a member of the Tripura Legislative Assembly from 1977 to 1983 representing the Manu constituency. He was the father of Jitendra Chaudhury, the 14th Leader of Opposition in the Tripura Legislative Assembly.
