= Jadab Lal Debnath =

Indian politician

Jadab Lal Debnath (born 1968) is an Indian politician from Tripura. He is a member of the Tripura Legislative Assembly from Bagbassa Assembly constituency in North Tripura district. He was first elected in the 2023 Tripura Legislative Assembly election, representing the Bharatiya Janata Party.

== Early life and education ==
Debnath is from Jubarajnagar, North Tripura district, Tripura. He is the son of the late Akshay Kumar Debnath. He studied Class 12 at Padmapur High School and passed the Tripura Board of Secondary Education examinations in 1986. His wife is in government service.

== Career ==
Debnath won the Bagbassa Assembly constituency representing the Bharatiya Janata Party in the 2023 Tripura Legislative Assembly election. He polled 18,905 votes and defeated his nearest rival, Bijita Nath of the Communist Party of India (Marxist), by a margin of 1,461 votes.

In a controversy in March 2023, Jadav Lal Nath faced allegations of watching a video purported to be explicit content and Opposition members gave a written complaint to the speaker seeking action. Nath pleaded innocence. Later, an Ethics committee of the Tripura Legislative Assembly gave a clean chit to Nath.
