= Samsul Haque =

Indian politician (1956–2023)

Samsul Haque (1956–19 July 2023) was an Indian politician from Tripura. He was a member of the Tripura Legislative Assembly from the Boxanagar Assembly constituency in Sipahijala district. He was first elected in the 2023 Tripura Legislative Assembly election, representing the Communist Party of India (Marxist).

== Early life and education ==
Haque was from Boxanagar, Sipahijala district, Tripura. He was the son of the late Ali Miah. He passed Class 10 in 1972 at Kulubari School.

== Career ==
Haque was elected from the Boxanagar Assembly constituency representing the Communist Party of India (Marxist) in the 2023 Tripura Legislative Assembly election. He polled 19,404 votes and defeated his nearest rival, Tafajjal Hossain of the Bharatiya Janata Party, by a margin of 4,849 votes. He became an MLA for the first time in the 2023 assembly elections after the party nominated him from Boxanagar instead of the three-time MLA Sahid Chowdhury.

=== Death ===
Haque suffered a heart attack at the MLA hostel in Agartala and died on 19 July 2023. Former chief minister Manik Sarkar and CPI (M) party state secretary Jitendra Chowdhury paid respects to the deceased, whose body was taken to the Party offices at Agartala and Sonamura.
