= Nayan Sarkar =

Indian politician

Member of the Tripura Legislative Assembly
- Incumbent
- Assumed office 8 September 2023
- Preceded by: Krishnadhan Das
- Constituency: Bamutia

Personal details
- Born: Bamutia
- Party: CPI(M)
- Parent: Haricharan Sarkar
- Education: Post Graduate

Nayan Sarkar (born 1988) is an Indian politician from Tripura. He is a member of Communist Party of India (Marxist). He was first elected as a Member of the Tripura Legislative Assembly from the Bamutia Assembly constituency, which is reserved for Scheduled Castes, in the 2023 Tripura Legislative Assembly election.

== Early life and education ==
Sarkar is from Mohanpur, Bamutia, West Tripura district. HIs late father Haricharan Sarkar was a farmer. He completed his M.A. in Education in 2020 at ICFAI University. His net worth, as declared in the affidavit submitted to the Election Commission of India, is Rs.7.8 lakhs. He has no criminal cases against him.

== Career ==
Sarkar was elected from the Bamutia Assembly constituency representing the Communist Party of India (Marxist) in the 2023 Tripura Legislative Assembly election, defeating the sitting BJP MLA Krishnadhan Das by a margin of 2026 votes.
