= Shyamal Chakraborty (Tripura politician) =

Indian politician

Shyamal Chakraborty (born 1956) is an Indian politician from Tripura. He is a member of the Tripura Legislative Assembly from Sonamura Assembly constituency in Sipahijala district. He won the 2023 Tripura Legislative Assembly election, representing the Communist Party of India (Marxist), In March 2024, he was appointed as the deputy leader of the opposition.

== Early life and education ==
Chakraborty is from Sonamura, Sipahijala district, Tripura. He is the son of the late Upendra Chakraborty. He passed Class 12 in 1973.

== Career ==
He first became an MLA from the Sonamura Assembly constituency representing the Communist Party of India (Marxist) in the 2013 Tripura Legislative Assembly election, polling 18,043 votes and defeating Subal Bhowmik of the Indian National Congress by a margin of 1,526 votes. He retained the seat for the 2018 Tripura Legislative Assembly election for the CPI (M), defeating Bhowmik again, who contested on the BJP ticket this time. In 2018, he polled 19,275 votes and won by a margin of 3,432 votes. He won for a third consecutive time in the 2023 Assembly election, polling 20,039 votes and defeating his nearest rival, Debabrata Bhattacharjee of the Bharatiya Janata Party, by a margin of 2,415 votes.
