= Burba Mohan Tripura =

Indian politician

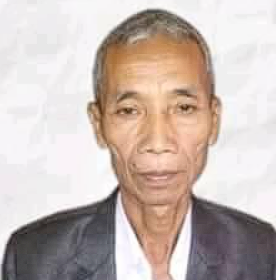

Member of the Tripura Legislative Assembly
- In office 4 March 2018 – 23 September 2022
- Preceded by: Priyamani Debbarma
- Succeeded by: Sanjoy Manik Tripura
- Constituency: Karbook

Personal details
- Born: 8 February 1955 Madhu Krishna Para, Patichhari
- Died: 10 May 2025 (aged 70)
- Party: Tipra Motha Party
- Other political affiliations: Bharatiya Janata Party (2018–2022)
- Children: 4
- Occupation: Politician

Burba Mohan Tripura was an Indian politician from Tripura. He was a member of the Bharatiya Janata Party. He won the election in 2018 as a Member of Legislative Assembly (MLA) of Tripura representing Karbook In 2022, he left the BJP and joined the Tipra Motha Party.

== Political career ==
Tripura was a member of the Tribal Advisory Committee of Tribal Welfare Department, Government of Tripura from 2019 to 2022. He also served as a member of the Committee on Welfare of Scheduled Tribes from 2021 to 2022.

== Death ==
Burba Mohan Tripura died on May 10, 2025, following a brief battle with blood cancer. He was undergoing treatment at the G.B.P Hospital.
