= Sabroom Assembly constituency =

Legislative Assembly constituency in Tripura state, India

Coordinates: 23.01°N 91.71°E

Sabroom
- Constituency No. 40 for the Tripura Legislative Assembly

Constituency details
- Country: India
- Region: Northeast India
- State: Tripura
- District: South Tripura
- Lok Sabha constituency: Tripura East
- Established: 1967
- Total electors: 48,064
- Reservation: None

Member of Legislative Assembly
- 13th Tripura Legislative Assembly
- Incumbent Jitendra Chaudhury
- Party: Communist Party of India (Marxist)
- Elected year: 2023

Sabroom Legislative Assembly constituency is one of the 60 Legislative Assembly constituencies of Tripura state in India.

It is part of South Tripura district.

== Members of the Legislative Assembly ==
Election	Member	Party
1967	A. Mag	Indian National Congress
1972	Kalipada Banerji	Indian National Congress
1977	Sunil Kumar Chowdhury	Communist Party of India (Marxist)
1983	Sunil Kumar Chowdhury	Communist Party of India (Marxist)
1988	Sunil Kumar Chowdhury	Communist Party of India (Marxist)
1993	Sunil Kumar Chowdhury	Communist Party of India (Marxist)
1998	Gour Kanti Goswami	Communist Party of India (Marxist)
2003	Gour Kanti Goswami	Communist Party of India (Marxist)
2008	Rita Kar (Majumder)	Communist Party of India (Marxist)
2013	Rita Kar (Majumder)	Communist Party of India (Marxist)
2018	Sankar Roy	Bharatiya Janata Party
2023	Jitendra Chaudhury	Communist Party of India (Marxist)

== Election results ==
=== 2023 Assembly election ===
2023 Tripura Legislative Assembly election: Sabroom
Party	Candidate	Votes	%	±%
CPI(M)	Jitendra Chaudhury	21,801	49.02	▲3.63
BJP	Sankar Roy	21,405	48.13	▼2.51
NOTA	None of the Above	1,265	2.84	▲1.86
Margin of victory		396	0.89	▼4.36
Turnout		44,471	92.65	▼2.05
Registered electors		48,064		▲9.31
CPI(M) gain from BJP		Swing	▼1.62	

=== 2018 Assembly election ===
2018 Tripura Legislative Assembly election: Sabroom
Party	Candidate	Votes	%	±%
BJP	Sankar Roy	21,059	50.64	▲48.78
CPI(M)	Rita Kar Majumder	18,877	45.39	▼10.47
INC	Manoranjan Datta	470	1.13	▼41.15
NOTA	None of the Above	410	0.99	New
Independent	Narayan Chandra Dey	353	0.85	New
Margin of victory		2,182	5.25	▼8.34
Turnout		41,584	93.72	▼1.04
Registered electors		43,970		▲9.73
BJP gain from CPI(M)		Swing	▼5.22	

=== 2013 Assembly election ===
2013 Tripura Legislative Assembly election: Sabroom
Party	Candidate	Votes	%	±%
CPI(M)	Rita Kar (Majumder)	21,404	55.87	▼1.18
INC	Premtosh Nath	16,197	42.28	New
BJP	Bhalu Rani Dey	712	1.86	▲0.04
Margin of victory		5,207	13.59	▼11.12
Turnout		38,313	95.68	▲2.01
Registered electors		40,072		
CPI(M) hold		Swing		

=== 2008 Assembly election ===
2008 Tripura Legislative Assembly election: Sabroom
Party	Candidate	Votes	%	±%
CPI(M)	Rita Kar (Majumder)	19,181	57.05	▼1.50
Independent	Premtosh Nath	10,874	32.34	New
PDS	Bibhash Basak	2,062	6.13	New
BJP	Ranjit Roy Chowdhury	611	1.82	New
Independent	Phani Bhusan Tripura	600	1.78	New
AITC	Sunil Chandra Nath	294	0.87	▼0.65
Margin of victory		8,307	24.71	▲4.83
Turnout		33,622	93.86	▲7.97
Registered electors		35,919		
CPI(M) hold		Swing	▼1.50	

=== 2003 Assembly election ===
2003 Tripura Legislative Assembly election: Sabroom
Party	Candidate	Votes	%	±%
CPI(M)	Gour Kanti Goswami	16,445	58.54	▼0.79
INC	Sankar Malla	10,861	38.67	▼0.06
AITC	Sunil Chandra Nath	427	1.52	New
Independent	Subhas Das(Netaji)	357	1.27	New
Margin of victory		5,584	19.88	▼0.73
Turnout		28,090	85.64	▲1.27
Registered electors		32,803		▲5.90
CPI(M) hold		Swing	▼0.79	

=== 1998 Assembly election ===
1998 Tripura Legislative Assembly election: Sabroom
Party	Candidate	Votes	%	±%
CPI(M)	Gour Kanti Goswami	15,507	59.34	▲7.34
INC	Manoranjan Debnath	10,121	38.73	▼8.11
BJP	Ranajit Roy Chowdhury	505	1.93	New
Margin of victory		5,386	20.61	▲15.44
Turnout		26,133	85.60	▼1.07
Registered electors		30,976		▲8.24
CPI(M) hold		Swing		

=== 1993 Assembly election ===
1993 Tripura Legislative Assembly election: Sabroom
Party	Candidate	Votes	%	±%
CPI(M)	Sunil Kumar Chowdhury	12,714	52.00	▲0.95
INC	Parimal Nandy	11,451	46.83	▼1.83
Independent	Benode Behari Chowdhury	154	0.63	New
Independent	Nital Mahumder	131	0.54	New
Margin of victory		1,263	5.17	▲2.78
Turnout		24,450	86.50	▼3.04
Registered electors		28,618		▲21.90
CPI(M) hold		Swing	▲0.95	

=== 1988 Assembly election ===
1988 Tripura Legislative Assembly election: Sabroom
Party	Candidate	Votes	%	±%
CPI(M)	Sunil Kumar Chowdhury	10,605	51.05	▼1.50
INC	Manoranjan Debnath	10,109	48.67	▲2.67
Margin of victory		496	2.39	▼4.17
Turnout		20,772	89.39	▲2.02
Registered electors		23,477		▲16.99
CPI(M) hold		Swing		

=== 1983 Assembly election ===
1983 Tripura Legislative Assembly election: Sabroom
Party	Candidate	Votes	%	±%
CPI(M)	Sunil Kumar Chowdhury	9,118	52.55	▲5.61
INC	Adhir Chandra Bhaumik	7,981	46.00	▲19.34
Independent	Nitai Charan Mazumder	252	1.45	New
Margin of victory		1,137	6.55	▼13.73
Turnout		17,351	87.50	▲4.10
Registered electors		20,068		▲18.68
CPI(M) hold		Swing		

=== 1977 Assembly election ===
1977 Tripura Legislative Assembly election: Sabroom
Party	Candidate	Votes	%	±%
CPI(M)	Sunil Kumar Chowdhury	6,537	46.94	▲13.25
INC	Rabindra Kumar Patari	3,712	26.66	▼39.65
JP	Kalipada Banerji	2,760	19.82	New
CPI	Shake Ahamed	527	3.78	New
TPCC	Rakhal Sen	390	2.80	New
Margin of victory		2,825	20.29	▼12.33
Turnout		13,926	83.94	▲11.62
Registered electors		16,909		▲28.34
CPI(M) gain from INC		Swing	▼19.37	

=== 1972 Assembly election ===
1972 Tripura Legislative Assembly election: Sabroom
Party	Candidate	Votes	%	±%
INC	Kalipada Banerji	6,180	66.31	▼3.62
CPI(M)	Sunil Kumar Chowdhury	3,140	33.69	New
Margin of victory		3,040	32.62	▼9.42
Turnout		9,320	72.90	▼2.84
Registered electors		13,175		▼41.75
INC hold		Swing	▼3.62	

=== 1967 Assembly election ===
1967 Tripura Legislative Assembly election: Sabroom
Party	Candidate	Votes	%	±%
INC	A. Mag	11,638	69.93	New
CPI	A. Mag	4,642	27.89	New
Independent	U. M. Chowdhury	277	1.66	New
Independent	B. Debbarma	85	0.51	New
Margin of victory		6,996	42.04	
Turnout		16,642	77.56	
Registered electors		22,618		
INC win (new seat)				

== See also ==
- List of constituencies of the Tripura Legislative Assembly
- South Tripura district
