= Pravat Chowdhury =

Indian politician

Member of Legislative Assembly, Tripura
- In office 24 September 2014 – 2023
- Preceded by: Jitendra Choudhury
- Succeeded by: Mailafru Mog
- Constituency: Manu ST

Personal details
- Born: 28 December 1976 (age 49) Sabroom, South Tripura district
- Party: Communist Party of India (Marxist)
- Spouse: Smt. Dipali Tripura (Chowdhury)
- Children: 2
- Parent(s): Lt. Krishna Kanta Chowdhury (Father); Smt. Dhanusri Chowdhury (Mother)
- Education: Nagaland University

Pravat Chowdhury (born 28 December 1976) is an Indian politician and member of the Communist Party of India (Marxist). Chowdhury was a member of the Tripura Legislative Assembly from the Manu (Vidhan Sabha constituency) in South Tripura district from 2014 to 2023.

== Career ==
Chowdhury was elected in a 2014 by-election to this seat, after the previous incumbent, Jitendra Choudhury, resigned to take his Lok Sabha seat for Tripura East after winning in 2014. Pravat Chowdhury won the by-election in a landslide, by a record margin of nearly 16,000 votes. Chowdhury won re-election to a full term during the 2018 Tripura Legislative Assembly election, but this time by a much smaller margin. His victory by 193 votes, or 0.48%, against Dhananjoy Tripura of the Indigenous People's Front of Tripura was the closest contest in the state.

== See also ==
- Jitendra Choudhury
- Radhacharan Debbarma
- Badal Chowdhury
