= Ramnagar, Tripura Assembly constituency =

Legislative Assembly constituency in Tripura State, India

Coordinates: 23.6°N 91.28°E

Ramnagar
- Constituency No. 07 for the Tripura Legislative Assembly

Constituency details
- Country: India
- Region: Northeast India
- State: Tripura
- District: West Tripura
- Lok Sabha constituency: Tripura West
- Established: 1977
- Total electors: 45,411
- Reservation: None

Member of Legislative Assembly
- 13th Tripura Legislative Assembly
- Incumbent Dipak Majumder
- Party: Bharatiya Janata Party
- Elected year: 2024

Ramnagar is one of the 60 Legislative Assembly constituencies of Tripura state in India. It is in West Tripura district and is a part of Tripura West (Lok Sabha constituency).

== Members of the Legislative Assembly ==
Election	Member	Party
1977	Biren Datta	Communist Party of India (Marxist)
1983	Biren Datta	Communist Party of India (Marxist)
1988	Surajit Datta	Indian National Congress
1993	Surajit Datta	Indian National Congress
1998	Surajit Datta	Indian National Congress
2003	Surajit Datta	Indian National Congress
2008	Surajit Datta	Indian National Congress
2013	Ratan Das	Communist Party of India (Marxist)
2018	Surajit Datta	Bharatiya Janata Party
2023	Surajit Datta	Bharatiya Janata Party
2024^	Dipak Majumder	Bharatiya Janata Party

- ^ denotes by-election

== Election results ==
=== 2024 by-election ===
Tripura Legislative Assembly by-election, 2024: Ramnagar
Party	Candidate	Votes	%	±%
BJP	Dipak Majumder	25,380	75.46	▲29.26
CPI(M)	Ratan Das	7,366	21.90	New
NOTA	None of the Above	887	2.64	▲0.83
Majority		18,014	53.56	▲51.19
Turnout		32,574	71.19	▼12.05
BJP hold		Swing		

=== 2023 Assembly election ===
2023 Tripura Legislative Assembly election: Ramnagar
Party	Candidate	Votes	%	±%
BJP	Surajit Datta	17,455	46.20	▼7.31
Independent	Purushuttam Roy Barman	16,558	43.83	New
AITC	Pujan Biswas	2,079	5.50	▲4.81
Independent	Dulal Ghosh	1,005	2.66	New
NOTA	None of the Above	685	1.81	▲0.98
Margin of victory		897	2.37	▼9.94
Turnout		37,782	83.24	▼7.08
Registered electors		45,411		▲4.01
BJP hold		Swing	▼7.31	

=== 2018 Assembly election ===
2018 Tripura Legislative Assembly election: Ramnagar
Party	Candidate	Votes	%	±%
BJP	Surajit Datta	21,092	53.51	▲51.72
CPI(M)	Ratan Das	16,237	41.19	▼8.00
INC	Pujan Biswas	648	1.64	▼47.37
NOTA	None of the Above	329	0.83	New
AITC	Soumen Majumder	274	0.70	New
Margin of victory		4,855	12.32	▲12.14
Turnout		39,416	88.44	▲0.55
Registered electors		43,659		▲6.71
BJP gain from CPI(M)		Swing	▲4.32	

=== 2013 Assembly election ===
2013 Tripura Legislative Assembly election: Ramnagar
Party	Candidate	Votes	%	±%
CPI(M)	Ratan Das	18,060	49.19	▲4.45
INC	Surajit Datta	17,995	49.02	▼3.20
BJP	Bidyut Ghosh	657	1.79	▼0.09
Margin of victory		65	0.18	▼7.29
Turnout		36,712	89.85	▲0.63
Registered electors		40,915		
CPI(M) gain from INC		Swing		

=== 2008 Assembly election ===
2008 Tripura Legislative Assembly election: Ramnagar
Party	Candidate	Votes	%	±%
INC	Surajit Datta	16,569	52.22	▼1.88
CPI(M)	Ratan Das	14,198	44.74	▲1.23
BJP	Nilima Ghosh	595	1.88	▼0.52
AIFB	Dulal Deb	370	1.17	New
Margin of victory		2,371	7.47	▼3.11
Turnout		31,732	89.19	▲13.43
Registered electors		35,616		
INC hold		Swing	▼1.88	

=== 2003 Assembly election ===
2003 Tripura Legislative Assembly election: Ramnagar
Party	Candidate	Votes	%	±%
INC	Surajit Datta	14,431	54.10	▲0.82
CPI(M)	Samir Chakraborty	11,608	43.51	▲4.01
BJP	Chandan De	638	2.39	▼4.83
Margin of victory		2,823	10.58	▼3.20
Turnout		26,677	75.89	▼3.92
Registered electors		35,259		▲12.39
INC hold		Swing		

=== 1998 Assembly election ===
1998 Tripura Legislative Assembly election: Ramnagar
Party	Candidate	Votes	%	±%
INC	Surajit Datta	13,303	53.28	▼0.39
CPI(M)	Madhu Sengupta	9,862	39.50	▼2.30
BJP	Mati Lal Das	1,803	7.22	▲3.41
Margin of victory		3,441	13.78	▲1.92
Turnout		24,968	81.39	▲3.13
Registered electors		31,373		▲0.07
INC hold		Swing		

=== 1993 Assembly election ===
1993 Tripura Legislative Assembly election: Ramnagar
Party	Candidate	Votes	%	±%
INC	Surajit Datta	12,862	53.67	▲1.87
CPI(M)	Chhaya Baul	10,018	41.80	▼5.81
BJP	Paritosh Pal	914	3.81	New
Margin of victory		2,844	11.87	▲7.68
Turnout		23,967	77.52	▼6.43
Registered electors		31,350		▲26.20
INC hold		Swing		

=== 1988 Assembly election ===
1988 Tripura Legislative Assembly election: Ramnagar
Party	Candidate	Votes	%	±%
INC	Surajit Datta	10,663	51.79	▲3.44
CPI(M)	Khagen Das	9,802	47.61	▼3.18
Margin of victory		861	4.18	▲1.74
Turnout		20,587	83.80	▲4.12
Registered electors		24,841		▲23.81
INC gain from CPI(M)		Swing		

=== 1983 Assembly election ===
1983 Tripura Legislative Assembly election: Ramnagar
Party	Candidate	Votes	%	±%
CPI(M)	Biren Dutta	8,026	50.80	▼12.62
INC	Amar Ranjan Gupta	7,640	48.35	▲29.13
Independent	Jyotimoy Ghosh	134	0.85	New
Margin of victory		386	2.44	▼41.74
Turnout		15,800	80.24	▲1.25
Registered electors		20,063		▲17.11
CPI(M) hold		Swing		

=== 1977 Assembly election ===
1977 Tripura Legislative Assembly election: Ramnagar
Party	Candidate	Votes	%	±%
CPI(M)	Biren Datta	8,420	63.41	New
INC	Apanshu Mohan Lodh	2,553	19.23	New
JP	Naripendra Mohan Paul	1,240	9.34	New
TPCC	Pramode Ranjan Dasgupta	870	6.55	New
Independent	Anukul Chandra Saha	195	1.47	New
Margin of victory		5,867	44.19	
Turnout		13,278	78.72	
Registered electors		17,132		
CPI(M) win (new seat)				

== See also ==
- List of constituencies of the Tripura Legislative Assembly
- West Tripura district
