= Barjala Assembly constituency =

Legislative Assembly constituency in Tripura State, India

Coordinates: 23.86°N 91.27°E

Barjala
- Constituency No. 4 for the Tripura Legislative Assembly

Constituency details
- Country: India
- Region: Northeast India
- State: Tripura
- District: West Tripura
- Lok Sabha constituency: Tripura West
- Established: 1972
- Total electors: 47,145
- Reservation: SC

Member of Legislative Assembly
- 13th Tripura Legislative Assembly
- Incumbent Sudip Sarkar
- Party: CPI(M)
- Elected year: 2023

Barjala is one of the 60 Legislative Assembly constituencies of Tripura state in India. It is part of West Tripura district and is reserved for candidates belonging to the Scheduled Castes. It is part of Tripura West (Lok Sabha constituency).

== Members of the Legislative Assembly ==
Election	Member	Party
1972	Basana Chakraborty	Indian National Congress
1977	Gouri Bhattacharjee	Communist Party of India
1983	Gouri Bhattacharjee	Communist Party of India
1988	Dipak Kumar Roy	Indian National Congress
1993	Arun Bhowmik	Janata Dal
1998	Dipak Kumar Roy	Indian National Congress
2003	Dipak Kumar Roy	Indian National Congress
2008	Sankar Prasad Datta	Communist Party of India
2013	Jitendra Sarkar	Indian National Congress
2018	Dr. Dilip Kumar Das	Bharatiya Janata Party
2023	Sudip Sarkar	Communist Party of India

== Election results ==
=== 2023 Assembly election ===
2023 Tripura Legislative Assembly election: Barjala
Party	Candidate	Votes	%	±%
CPI(M)	Sudip Sarkar	21,486	50.93%	▲11.16
BJP	Dilip Kumar Das	19,697	46.69%	▼8.73
NOTA	None of the Above	1,001	2.37%	▲1.77
Margin of victory		1,789	4.24%	▼11.41
Turnout		42,184	89.67%	▼4.46
Registered electors		47,145		▲11.30
CPI(M) gain from BJP		Swing	▼4.49	

=== 2018 Assembly election ===
2018 Tripura Legislative Assembly election: Barjala
Party	Candidate	Votes	%	±%
BJP	Dr. Dilip Kumar Das	22,052	55.42%	▲54.00
CPI(M)	Jhumu Sarkar	15,825	39.77%	▼8.75
INC	Dipak Das	650	1.63%	▼47.61
AITC	Utpal Das	293	0.74%	New
NOTA	None of the Above	241	0.61%	New
Margin of victory		6,227	15.65%	▲14.92
Turnout		39,789	92.76%	▼0.64
Registered electors		42,358		▲11.29
BJP gain from INC		Swing	▲6.17	

=== 2013 Assembly election ===
2013 Tripura Legislative Assembly election: Barjala
Party	Candidate	Votes	%	±%
INC	Jitendra Sarkar	17,728	49.25%	▲1.49
CPI(M)	Jitendra Das	17,467	48.52%	▼0.41
BJP	Samir Biswas	511	1.42%	▲0.05
SP	Rahul Das	291	0.81%	New
Margin of victory		261	0.73%	▼0.45
Turnout		35,997	94.64%	▲1.33
Registered electors		38,061		
INC gain from CPI(M)		Swing	▲0.31	

=== 2008 Assembly election ===
2008 Tripura Legislative Assembly election: Barjala
Party	Candidate	Votes	%	±%
CPI(M)	Sankar Prasad Datta	24,853	48.93%	▲1.42
INC	Dipak Kumar Roy	24,255	47.76%	▼2.50
BJP	Pulak Kumar Debnath	697	1.37%	New
AITC	Pradip Chakraborty	371	0.73%	▼0.40
NCP	Sanjib Dey	356	0.70%	New
AIFB	Jayanta Kumar Datta	257	0.51%	New
Margin of victory		598	1.18%	▼1.57
Turnout		50,789	93.47%	▲11.29
Registered electors		54,467		
CPI(M) gain from INC		Swing	▼1.32	

=== 2003 Assembly election ===
2003 Tripura Legislative Assembly election: Barjala
Party	Candidate	Votes	%	±%
INC	Dipak Kumar Roy	18,851	50.26%	▼0.55
CPI(M)	Kalyani Dey(Mitra)	17,821	47.51%	▲5.54
AITC	Pradip Chakraborty	423	1.13%	New
Independent	Brajalal Debnath	413	1.10%	New
Margin of victory		1,030	2.75%	▼6.09
Turnout		37,508	81.96%	▲1.33
Registered electors		45,767		▲15.51
INC hold		Swing	▼0.55	

=== 1998 Assembly election ===
1998 Tripura Legislative Assembly election: Barjala
Party	Candidate	Votes	%	±%
INC	Dipak Kumar Roy	16,229	50.81%	▲15.88
CPI(M)	Chhaya Baul	13,407	41.97%	New
BJP	Manik Das	2,231	6.98%	▲5.68
Margin of victory		2,822	8.83%	▼0.21
Turnout		31,943	82.06%	▲3.47
Registered electors		39,620		▼0.29
INC gain from JD		Swing		

=== 1993 Assembly election ===
1993 Tripura Legislative Assembly election: Barjala
Party	Candidate	Votes	%	±%
JD	Arun Bhowmik	13,483	43.98%	New
INC	Dipak Kumar Roy	10,709	34.93%	▼18.59
Independent	Chuni Lal Roy	5,587	18.22%	New
BJP	Sujit Charkraborty	400	1.30%	New
Independent	Manindra Malakar	176	0.57%	New
Margin of victory		2,774	9.05%	▲0.63
Turnout		30,658	78.26%	▼7.49
Registered electors		39,736		▲51.43
JD gain from INC		Swing	▼9.55	

=== 1988 Assembly election ===
1988 Tripura Legislative Assembly election: Barjala
Party	Candidate	Votes	%	±%
INC	Dipak Kumar Roy	11,889	53.53%	▲33.64
CPI(M)	Gouri Bhattacharjee	10,020	45.11%	▼4.19
JP	Chatta Bin	147	0.66%	▼0.32
Margin of victory		1,869	8.41%	▼11.26
Turnout		22,212	85.85%	▲2.43
Registered electors		26,241		▲30.36
INC gain from CPI(M)		Swing		

=== 1983 Assembly election ===
1983 Tripura Legislative Assembly election: Barjala
Party	Candidate	Votes	%	±%
CPI(M)	Gouri Bhattacharjee	8,160	49.30%	▼9.49
Independent	Basana Chakraborty	4,904	29.63%	New
INC	Bholanath Deb	3,292	19.89%	▲6.47
JP	Chatta Bin	163	0.98%	▼2.96
Margin of victory		3,256	19.67%	▼15.27
Turnout		16,551	83.66%	▲1.53
Registered electors		20,130		▲16.77
CPI(M) hold		Swing	▼9.49	

=== 1977 Assembly election ===
1977 Tripura Legislative Assembly election: Barjala
Party	Candidate	Votes	%	±%
CPI(M)	Gouri Bhattacharjee	8,178	58.79%	▲24.39
TPCC	Reserwar Datta	3,317	23.84%	New
INC	Sachindra Dewanjee	1,867	13.42%	▼42.25
JP	Samar Bijoy Chakraborty	549	3.95%	New
Margin of victory		4,861	34.94%	▲13.68
Turnout		13,911	82.10%	▲14.07
Registered electors		17,239		▲71.26
CPI(M) gain from INC		Swing	▲3.12	

=== 1972 Assembly election ===
1972 Tripura Legislative Assembly election: Barjala
Party	Candidate	Votes	%	±%
INC	Basana Chakraborty	3,733	55.67%	New
CPI(M)	Gouri Bhattacharjee	2,307	34.40%	New
Independent	Chatta Bin	234	3.49%	New
Independent	Rash Mohan Debnath	169	2.52%	New
Independent	Raj Kumar Kamaljit Sing	149	2.22%	New
Independent	Gobinda Roy Chowdhury	114	1.70%	New
Margin of victory		1,426	21.26%	
Turnout		6,706	67.67%	
Registered electors		10,066		
INC win (new seat)				

== See also ==
- List of constituencies of the Tripura Legislative Assembly
- West Tripura district
