= Krishnadhan Das =

Indian politician

Member of Tripura Assembly
- In office 2018–2023
- Preceded by: Haricharan Sarkar
- Succeeded by: Nayan Sarkar
- Constituency: Bamutia

Personal details
- Born: 16 July 1975 (age 50) Chanmuri
- Party: Bharatiya Janata Party
- Parent: Santosh Chandra Das
- Education: 12th Pass
- Profession: Social Worker

Krishnadhan Das was a member of the 12th Tripura Legislative Assembly. He belongs to the Bharatiya Janata Party and represented Bamutia (Tripura Vidhan Sabha constituency).

== Criminal case ==
Charges were pressed against Krishnadhan for voluntarily causing hurt to deter a public servant from his duty under IPC section 332, punishment of criminal conspiracy under IPC section 120B, assault or criminal force to deter public servant from discharge of his duty under IPC section 353 and mischief causing damage to amount of fifty rupees under IPC section 427. In February 2020, a non-bailable warrant was issued against him.
