= Swapna Das Paul =

Indian politician

Swapna Das Paul (born 1975) is an Indian politician from Tripura. She is an MLA from the Surma Assembly constituency, which is a reserved constituency for Scheduled Caste community in Dhalai district. She represents the Bharatiya Janata Party and was first elected in the 2023 Tripura Legislative Assembly election.

== Early life and education ==
Paul is from Kamalpur, West Tripura. She married Paritosh Paul, a businessman. She passed her Class 12 exam conducted by the Tripura Board of Secondary Education.

== Career ==
Paul was elected from the 2023 Tripura Legislative Assembly election from Surma Assembly constituency representing the Bharatiya Janata Party. She polled 17,313 votes and defeated her nearest rival, Anjan Das of Communist Party of India (Marxist) by 4,838 votes. Earlier, she won the June 2022 bye election from Surma Assembly constituency defeating independent candidate Baburam Satnami by a margin of 4,583 votes.
