= Dipankar Sen =

Indian politician

Member of the Tripura Legislative Assembly
- Incumbent
- Assumed office 2023
- Preceded by: Arun Chandra Bhaumik
- Constituency: Belonia

Personal details
- Born: 1964 (age 61–62)
- Party: Communist Party of India (Marxist)
- Parent: Narendra Kishore Sen (Father)
- Education: 12th

Dipankar Sen is an Indian politician currently serving as a Member of the 13th Tripura Legislative Assembly, representing the Belonia constituency. He is a member of the Communist Party of India (Marxist) from Tripura.

Sen completed his higher secondary education at Vidyapith H.S. School, Belonia in 1983.
