= Priyamani Debbarma =

Indian politician

Member of Tripura Legislative Assembly
- In office 2013–2018
- Succeeded by: Burba Mohan Tripura
- Constituency: Karbook

Personal details
- Born: 12 February 1974 (age 52) Gandachera, Tripura, India
- Party: Communist Party of India (Marxist)
- Spouse: Smt. Sujata Debbarma

Priyamani Debbarma is a former member of the Tripura Legislative Assembly and a member of the Communist Party of India (Marxist). He was elected as a member of the Tripura Legislative Assembly in 2013 on the ticket of the CPI(M). In the 2018 Tripura Legislative Assembly election he was defeated by the BJP candidate Burba Mohan Tripura.
