= Tapas Dey =

Indian politician (1941/1942–2026)

Tapas Dey (1941 or 1942 – 11 September 2026) was an Indian politician who was a Member of the Legislative Assembly and Vice President of the Tripura Pradesh Congress Committee. Dey died in Agartala on 11 September 2026, at the age of 84.
