= Surajit Datta =

Indian politician (1953–2023)

Surajit Datta (1953–2023) was an Indian politician from Tripura. He was a member of the Tripura Legislative Assembly from Ramnagar Assembly constituency in West Tripura district. He won the 2023 Tripura Legislative Assembly election, representing the Bharatiya Janata Party.

== Early life and education ==
Datta was from Bordowali, West Tripura district, Tripura. He was the son of the late Shashadhar Datta. He passed Class 12 in 1974 at Pragati Vidyabhaban.

== Career ==
Datta was elected from the Ramnagar Assembly constituency representing the Bharatiya Janata Party in the 2023 Tripura Legislative Assembly election. In 2023, he polled 17,455 votes and defeated his nearest rival, Purushuttam Roy Barman, an independent candidate, by a margin of 897 votes. He first became an MLA winning the 1988 Tripura Legislative Assembly election representing the Indian National Congress and became a minister in the Congress-TUJS government led by Sudhir Ranjan Majumder. Later, he won the next four elections, also on the Congress ticket, in the 1993, 1998, 2003 and 2008 assembly elections, serving five consecutive terms. He lost to Ratan Das of the Communist Party of India (Marxist) in a rare defeat in the 2013 Assembly election. He regained the seat in the 2018 Tripura Legislative Assembly election after shifting allegiances to the Bharatiya Janata Party. He won again on the BJP ticket in the 2023 election.

=== Death ===
Datta died on 27 December 2023 at a Kolkata hospital after a prolonged illness. The government declared a period of state mourning on 28 December.
