= Ratan Kumar Bhowmik =

Indian politician

Member of Legislative Assembly Tripura
- In office 2013–2023
- Constituency: Kakraban-Salgarh (Vidhan Sabha constituency)

Personal details
- Party: Communist Party of India (Marxist)
- Profession: Politician

Ratan Kumar Bhowmik is an Indian politician and a member of the Communist Party of India (Marxist). He was a member of the Tripura Legislative Assembly from the Kakraban-Salgarh constituency in Gomati district.
