= Jitendra Chaudhury =

Indian politician (born 1958)

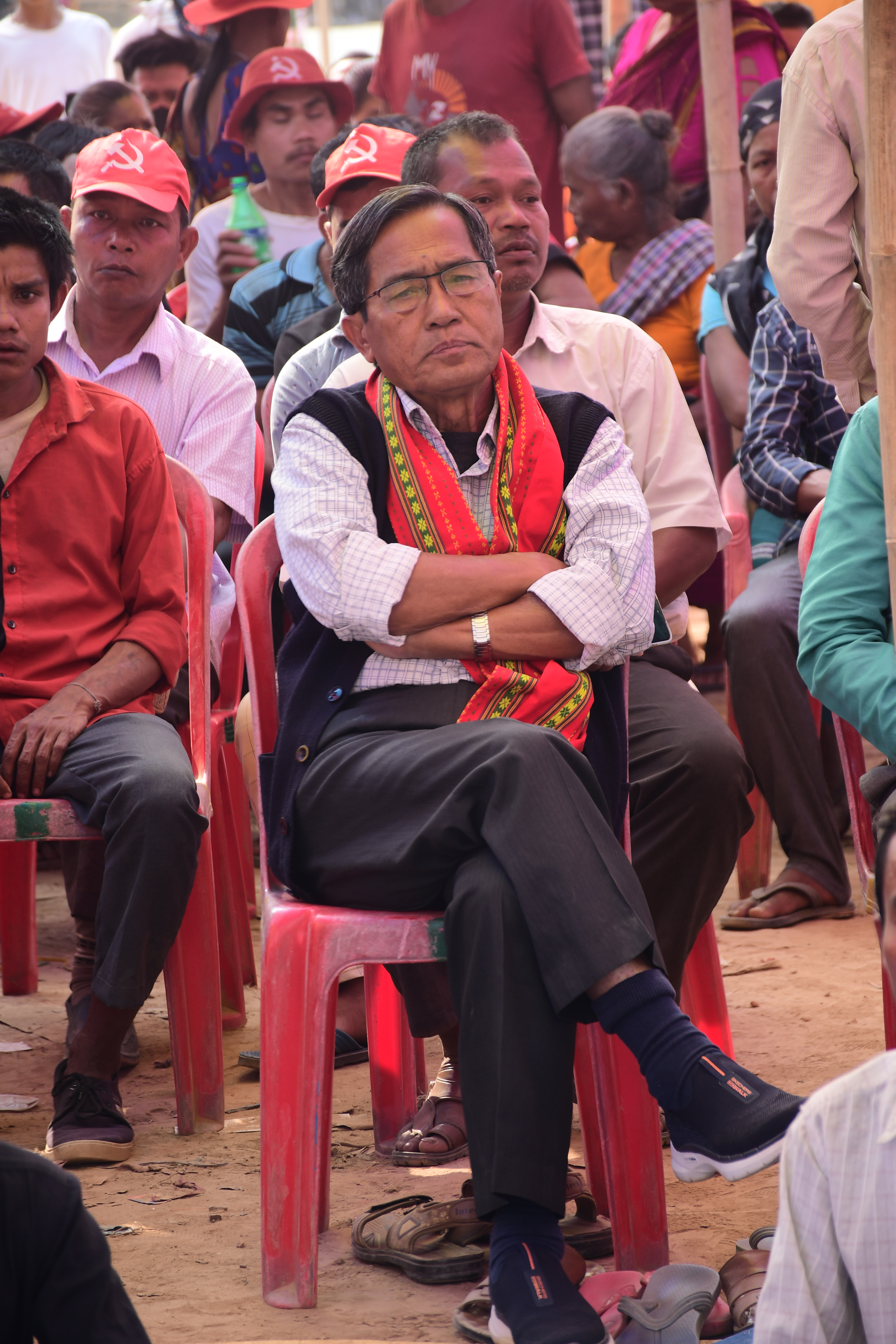
- Jitendra Chaudhury at a CPI(M) rally in Chailengta during the 2023 Tripura Assembly election campaign, 5 February 2023

14th Leader of Opposition in the Tripura Legislative Assembly
- Incumbent
- Assumed office 6 March 2024
- Preceded by: Animesh Debbarma

Member of the Politburo of the Communist Party of India (Marxist)
- Incumbent
- Assumed office 6 April 2025

Secretary of the Communist Party of India (Marxist) Tripura State Committee
- Incumbent
- Assumed office 19 September 2021
- Preceded by: Goutam Das

Member of the Tripura Legislative Assembly
- Incumbent
- Assumed office 2 March 2023
- Preceded by: Sankar Roy
- Constituency: Sabroom
- In office 1993–2014
- Preceded by: Angju Mog
- Succeeded by: Pravat Chowdhury
- Constituency: Manu (ST)

Member of the Lok Sabha for Tripura East
- In office 16 May 2014 – 23 May 2019
- Preceded by: Bajuban Reang
- Succeeded by: Rebati Tripura

Minister for Forest and Industry, Commerce, Sports, Govt of Tripura
- In office 1993–2014

Personal details
- Born: 27 June 1958 (age 68) Tripura, India
- Party: Communist Party of India (Marxist)
- Spouse: Manisha Debbarma
- Parent: Matahari Choudhury (father)
- Relatives: 1

Jitendra Chaudhury (born 27 June 1958) is an Indian communist politician who is a member of the Communist Party of India (Marxist) and serves as the incumbent MLA from Sabroom and as leader of the opposition. Previously, he had won the 2014 Indian general elections from the Tripura East (Lok Sabha constituency) before conceding defeat against Rebati Tripura of the BJP in 2019.

Jitendra Chaudhury is the current Secretary of the CPI(M) Tripura State Committee. At the 22nd Communist Party Congress in 2018, he was elected as a member of the central committee. He is the national Chairperson of the Adivasi Adhikar Rashtriya Manch (AARM).

== Early life ==
Chaudhury was born on 27 June 1958 in South Tripura to a Tripuri family. His parents were Matahari Chaudhury and Hematara Chaudhury. His father was also a member of the Tripura Legislative Assembly between 1978 and 1983. He completed his higher secondary education in 1980 at Umakanta Academy.

== Political career ==
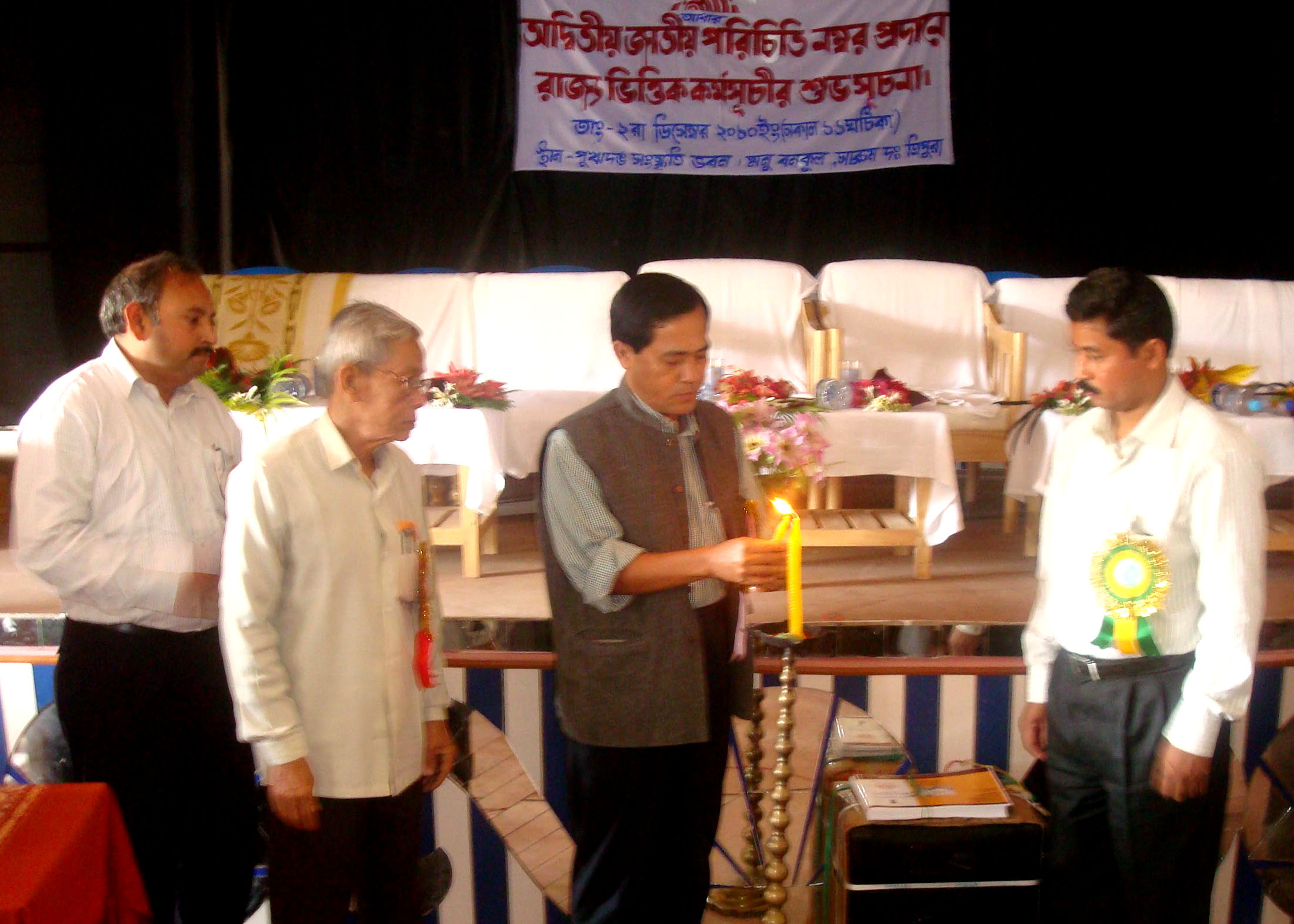
Jitendra Chowdhury lighting the lamp to launch the Unique ID Project (Aadhaar) in the State, at Rupaichhari RD Block, Tripura.

In 1993, Chaudhury was elected from the Manu ST constituency as the CPI(M) candidate in the Tripura Legislative Assembly election, which he won. He was the Minister of Forest and Industry, Commerce, Sports from 1993 to 1998 in the Dasarath Deb Ministry. He was also Minister of Forest and Industry, Commerce, Sports in the Manik Sarkar Ministry from 1998 to 2014. In 2014 Indian general election he was elected from the Tripura East (Lok Sabha constituency) and became Member of the 16th Lok Sabha from Tripura. However, in the 2019 Indian general election, he lost to Rebati Tripura. In the 2023 Tripura election, he was elected from the constituency of Sabroom.

=== Member of Parliament ===
Chaudhury was Member of Parliament, Lok Sabha between 2014 and 2019 from Tripura East. On 27 February 2016, he proposed that announcements should be made in the Kokborok language at the Agartala airport and Railway stations in Tripura. Following this, announcements on flight-related information in Kokborok were made mandatory at Agartala airport, as the civil aviation minister Ashok Gajapathi Raju informed Chaudhury through a letter.

=== State secretary of CPI(M), Tripura ===
On 19 September 2021, Chaudhury was named as the state secretary of Communist Party of India (Marxist) – Tripura following the death of the incumbent secretary Goutam Das, for an interim period until the party's next state conference. In 2022, at the conference of the CPI(M), Tripura state committee he was unanimously elected as the state secretary.

=== Leader of Opposition, Tripura Legislative Assembly ===
Chaudhury was sworn as Leader of Opposition of the Tripura Legislative Assembly on 20 March 2024. Following the Tipra Motha Party joining the BJP-led coalition government and the subsequent resignation of his predecessor Animesh Debbarma of the Tipra Motha Party, the CPI(M) became the prime opposition in the assembly.

== Electoral history ==
Chaudhury was elected as Member of Legislative Assembly from Manu for five consecutive terms and elected once as Member of Parliament, Lok Sabha. Currently he is the MLA from Sabroom.

=== Summary ===
==== Tripura Legislative Assembly elections ====
Year	Party	Constituency	Opponent		Result	Margin
1983	CPI(M)	Manu	INC	Angju Mog	Lost	1,942
1988	CPI(M)	Manu	INC	Angju Mog	Lost	169
1993	CPI(M)	Manu	INC	Angju Mog	Won	2,674
1998	CPI(M)	Manu	INC	Joykishore Tripura	Won	3,732
2003	CPI(M)	Manu	INPT	Chandan Tripura	Won	4,105
2008	CPI(M)	Manu	INC	Thaikhai Mog	Won	6,160
2013	CPI(M)	Manu	INC	Chandi Charan Tripura	Won	6,896
2023	CPI(M)	Sabroom	BJP	Sankar Roy	Won	396

==== Lok sabha elections ====
Year	Party	Constituency	Opponent		Result	Margin
2014	CPI(M)	Tripura East	INC	Sachitra Debbarma	Won	4,84,358
2019	CPI(M)	Tripura East	BJP	Rebati Tripura	Lost	2,81,163

=== Detailed results ===
==== Lok Sabha elections ====
===== Lok Sabha Election 2014 =====
2014 Indian general election: Tripura East
Party	Candidate	Votes	%	±%
CPI(M)	Jitendra Chaudhury	6,23,771	65.47	+2.00
INC	Sachitra Debbarma	1,39,413	14.63	−12.78
AITC	Bhriguram Reang	77,028	8.08	+7.57
BJP	Parikshit Debbarma	60,613	6.36	+4.13
Margin of victory		4,84,358	50.84	+14.84
Turnout		9,51,080	83.41	
CPI(M) hold		Swing		

===== Lok Sabha Election 2019 =====
2019 Indian general election: Tripura East
Party	Candidate	Votes	%	±%
BJP	Rebati Tripura	482,126	46.12	+40.13
INC	Maharaj Kumari Pragya Deb Burman	2,77,836	26.58	+12.78
CPI(M)	Jitendra Chaudhury	2,00,963	19.22	−46.00
IPFT	Narendra Chandra Debbarma	45,304	4.33	
Margin of victory		2,04,290	20.84	+14.84
Turnout		10,46,123	82.90	
BJP gain from CPI(M)		Swing		

=== Tripura Legislative Assembly elections ===
==== 1983 Assembly election ====
1983 Tripura Legislative Assembly election: Manu
Party	Candidate	Votes	%	±%
INC	Angju Mog	10,304	55.20%	▲20.64
CPI(M)	Jitendra Chaudhury	8,362	44.80%	▲2.14
Margin of victory		1,942	10.40%	▲2.31
Turnout		18,666	83.50%	▲5.12
Registered electors		22,733		▲18.65
INC gain from CPI(M)		Swing		

==== 1988 Assembly election ====
1988 Tripura Legislative Assembly election: Manu
Party	Candidate	Votes	%	±%
INC	Angju Mog	11,832	50.12%	▼5.08
CPI(M)	Jitendra Chaudhury	11,663	49.40%	▲4.60
Margin of victory		169	0.72%	▼9.69
Turnout		23,608	89.39%	▲6.11
Registered electors		26,760		▲17.71
INC hold		Swing		

==== 1993 Assembly election ====
1993 Tripura Legislative Assembly election: Manu
Party	Candidate	Votes	%	±%
CPI(M)	Jitendra Chaudhury	14,886	54.93%	▲5.53
INC	Angju Mog	12,212	45.07%	▼5.05
Margin of victory		2,674	9.87%	▲9.15
Turnout		27,098	85.01%	▼4.73
Registered electors		32,458		▲21.29
CPI(M) gain from INC		Swing		

==== 1998 Assembly election ====
1998 Tripura Legislative Assembly election: Manu
Party	Candidate	Votes	%	±%
CPI(M)	Jitendra Chaudhury	16,236	55.80%	▲0.87
INC	Joykishore Tripura	12,504	42.97%	▼2.09
BJP	Chandi Tripura	357	1.23%	New
Margin of victory		3,732	12.83%	▲2.96
Turnout		29,097	85.36%	▲0.52
Registered electors		34,635		▲6.71
CPI(M) hold		Swing		

==== 2003 Assembly election ====
2003 Tripura Legislative Assembly election: Manu
Party	Candidate	Votes	%	±%
CPI(M)	Jitendra Chaudhury	17,358	55.31%	▼0.49
INPT	Chandan Tripura	13,253	42.23%	New
BJP	Chandi Tripura	773	2.46%	▲1.24
Margin of victory		4,105	13.08%	▲0.25
Turnout		31,384	85.00%	▲0.98
Registered electors		36,927		▲6.62
CPI(M) hold		Swing		

==== 2008 Assembly election ====
2008 Tripura Legislative Assembly election: Manu
Party	Candidate	Votes	%	±%
CPI(M)	Jitendra Chaudhury	21,100	56.07%	▲0.77
INC	Thaikhai Mog	14,940	39.70%	New
Independent	Kirat Bahan Tripura	800	2.13%	New
BJP	Mrathaiong Mog	789	2.10%	▼0.37
Margin of victory		6,160	16.37%	▲3.29
Turnout		37,629	94.45%	▲9.09
Registered electors		39,999		
CPI(M) hold		Swing	▲0.77	

==== 2013 Assembly election ====
2013 Tripura Legislative Assembly election: Manu
Party	Candidate	Votes	%	±%
CPI(M)	Jitendra Chaudhury	21,320	58.07%	▲2.00
INC	Chandi Charan Tripura	14,424	39.29%	▼0.42
BJP	Thaiu Mog	971	2.64%	▲0.55
Margin of victory		6,896	18.78%	▲2.41
Turnout		36,715	96.01%	▲1.71
Registered electors		38,329		
CPI(M) hold		Swing		

==== 2023 Assembly election ====
2023 Tripura Legislative Assembly election: Sabroom
Party	Candidate	Votes	%	±%
CPI(M)	Jitendra Chaudhury	21,801	49.02%	▲3.63
BJP	Sankar Roy	21,405	48.13%	▼2.51
NOTA	None of the Above	1,265	2.84%	▲1.86
Margin of victory		396	0.89%	▼4.36
Turnout		44,471	92.65%	▼2.05
Registered electors		48,064		▲9.31
CPI(M) gain from BJP		Swing	▼1.62	

== Positions held ==
Year		Position	Place/organisation	Belonging party	Remark	Ref(s)
Assumed office	Left office	Position	Place/organisation	Belonging party	Remark	Ref(s)
1993	2014	MLA	Tripura Legislative Assembly	CPI(M)		
2014	2019	Member of Parliament	Lok sabha	CPI(M)		
2017	2023	Convenor	Adivasi Adhikar Rashtriya Manch (AARM)	CPI(M)		
2018	present	Central Committee Member	Communist Party of India (Marxist)	CPI(M)		
2019	2023	President	Ganamukti Parishad	CPI(M)		
2021	present	Secretary	CPI(M) Tripura	CPI(M)		
2023	present	MLA	Tripura Legislative Assembly	CPI(M)		
2023	present	Chairperson	Adivasi Adhikar Rashtriya Manch (AARM)	CPI(M)		
2024	present	Leader of Opposition	Tripura Legislative Assembly	CPI(M)		
2025	present	Polit Bureau Member	Communist Party of India (Marxist)	CPI(M)		

== See also ==
- Aghore Debbarma
- Radhacharan Debbarma
- Rebati Tripura
- Reang
