= 2018 Tripura Legislative Assembly election =

Indian state assembly election

- 18 February 2018

60 seats in the Tripura Legislative Assembly 31 seats needed for a majority
- Opinion polls
- Turnout: 91.38% (▼2.19 pp)
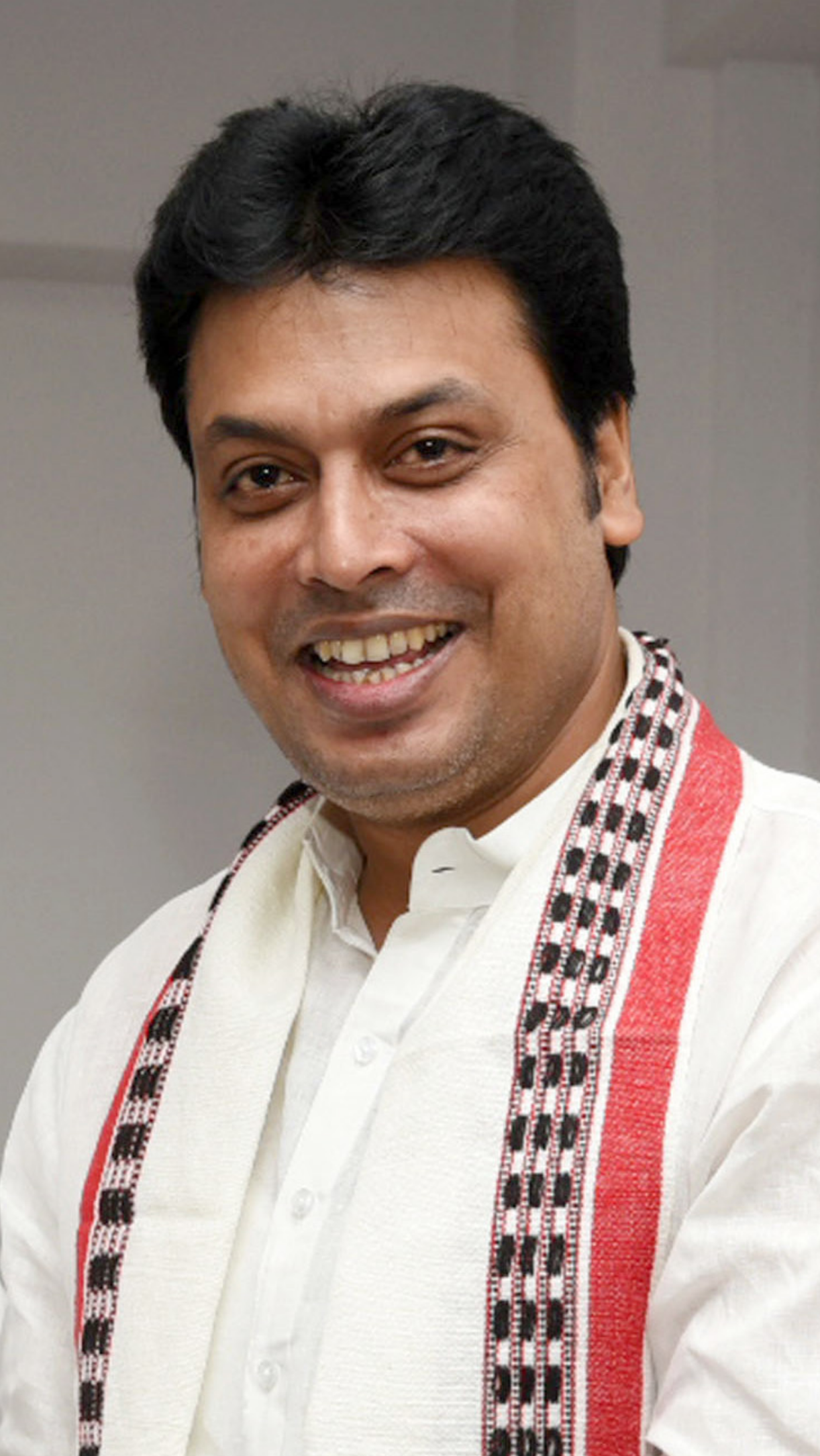

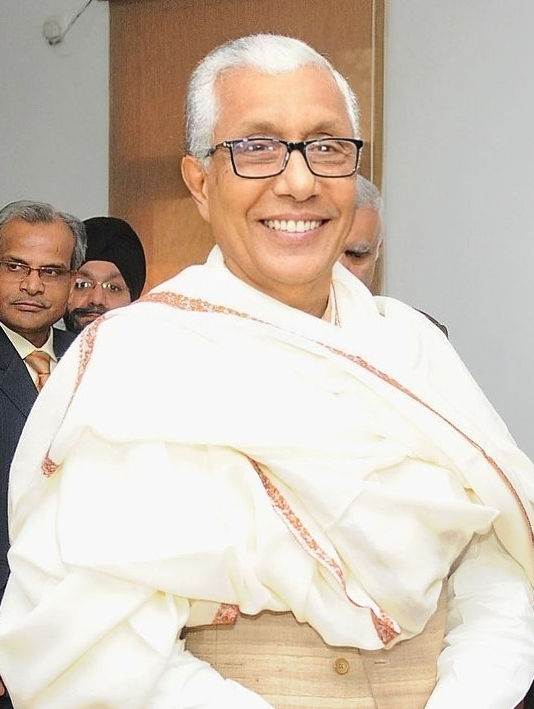
	Majority party	Minority party
Leader	Biplab Kumar Deb	Manik Sarkar
Party	BJP	CPI(M)
Alliance	NDA	LF
Leader since	2016	1998
Leader's seat	Banamalipur	Dhanpur
Last election	1.54%, 0 seat	51.63%, 49 seats
Seats won	36	16
Seat change	▲36	▼33
Popular vote	1,025,673	993,605
Percentage	43.59%	42.22%
Swing	▲42.05 pp	▼5.51 pp

Chief Minister before election
Manik Sarkar
CPI(M)
Elected Chief Minister
Biplab Kumar Deb
BJP

The 2018 Tripura Legislative Assembly election was held on 18 February for 59 of the state's 60 constituencies. The counting of votes took place on 3 March 2018. With 43.59% of the vote and 50.97% as an Alliance, the BJP secured a majority of seats (36) and subsequently formed the government with Biplab Kumar Deb as Chief Minister. Although the former governing Left Front alliance received 44.35% of the vote, it translated into only 16 seats.

== Background ==
The term of the Tripura Legislative Assembly ended on 6 March 2018. Having governed Tripura since the 1998 election, the ruling Left Front alliance, under Chief Minister Manik Sarkar, sought re-election. Meanwhile, the region in general had been under the political control of the CPI(M) for 25 years prior to the election, leading to the region being dubbed a "red holdout" even when the 34-year uninterrupted rule of a CPI(M)-led alliance of Communist parties in West Bengal, the world's longest democratically elected Communist-led government, came to an end in 2011.

Their primary challengers came in the form of the Bharatiya Janata Party, which under the leadership of Narendra Modi was the governing party of India on a national level. The BJP is a Hindu nationalist party, whose policies directly oppose those of the Communists. However, the party claimed no seats, and a mere 1.5% of the vote, in the region's previous election. Once considered a political pariah in Northeast India due to its significant Christian tribal population & the party's association with the Sangh Parivar (which aimed to achieve Hindu unity by achieving a Hindi belt centric cultural homogenisation), the BJP following its victory in the 2014 general elections had swiflty formed a coalition of Northeast-centric smaller parties within its larger national coalition to challenge the Congress hold over the region. BJP's first breakthrough in Northeast India came with its victory in Assam's legislative assembly elections in 2016 over issues of Muslim appeasement & an alleged demographic change caused by uncontrolled illegal infiltration of Bengali Muslims from Bangladesh. The Bengali Hindu majority of Tripura, whose forefathers had migrated to the state during Partition of Bengal to escape persecution by Bengali Muslims in East Bengal & had been constantly bickering with the Kokborok-speaking native Tripuri population which had led to incidents of bloodshed like the Mandai massacre deeply resonated with BJP's campaign against illegal infiltration of Bangladeshi Muslims. BJP's alliance with the Tripuri outfit Indigenous People's Front of Tripura also drew Tripuri votes to itself.

BJP built up its organisation in the state by engineering defections from the Left Front & Trinamool Congress (which in turn was engineering defections from the Congress based on dissatisfaction of local cadre with the party's decision to ally with CPI(M) in 2016 West Bengal legislative assembly election, a notable defector being Sudip Ray Barman). Despite the relatively small size of the state, the election took on additional significance on a national level as it was an acid test to gauge the successes of the BJP ahead of the following year's general election, and a chance to strip the communists, the party's "primary ideological enemy", of its last stronghold.

Prior to the election, a number of workers of the BJP were murdered. The BJP alleged that the murders were committed by CPI(M) members, which the party denies.

With losing this state, the CPI(M) party had only Kerala left under its rule in India.

== Schedule ==
The Election Commission of India announced that the Legislative Assembly elections in Tripura would be held on 18 February 2018 and the results would be announced on 3 March 2018.

Event	Date	Day
Date for nominations	24 Jan 2018	Wednesday
Last date for filing nominations	31 Jan 2018	Wednesday
Date for scrutiny of nominations	1 Feb 2018	Thursday
Last date for withdrawal of candidatures	3 Feb 2018	Saturday
Date of poll	18 Feb 2018	Sunday
Date of counting	3 Mar 2018	Saturday
Date before which the election shall be completed	5 Mar 2018	Monday

=== Electoral process changes ===
VVPAT-fitted EVMs was used in entire Tripura state in all polling stations in the 2018 elections, which was the first time that the entire state saw the implementation of VVPAT.

The election took place in a single phase on 18 February 2018 with 89.8% voter turnout. The results were announced on 3 March 2018.

== Contesting parties ==
=== National Democratic Alliance ===
National Democratic Alliance
Party	Flag	Symbol	Seats
Bharatiya Janata Party			51
Indigenous People's Front of Tripura			9
Total			60

=== Left Front ===
Left Front
Party	Flag	Symbol	Seats
Communist Party of India (Marxist)			57
Communist Party of India			1
Revolutionary Socialist Party			1
All India Forward Bloc			1
Total			60

=== Indian National Congress ===
Indian National Congress
Party	Flag	Symbol	Seats
Indian National Congress			59
Total			59

=== Others ===
Party	Symbol	Seats contested
All India Trinamool Congress		24
Amra Bangali		24
Indigenous Nationalist Party of Twipra		15
Tipraland State Party		10
Tripura Peoples Party		8
Communist Party of India (Marxist-Leninist) (Liberation)		5
Socialist Unity Centre of India (Communist)		5
North East India Development Party		1
Republican Party of India		1
Independent candidates		25

== Campaign ==
The other major force in the election was the Indian National Congress, who had taken 36.5% of the popular vote in the region in 2013. They are also, on a wider scale, the largest force in opposing Modi and the BJP in parliament. As such, Rahul Gandhi, in his capacity as the party's leader, campaigned in the region. They were determined to prevent the BJP from seizing control on the region, as such an outcome would represent the "demise of the Left".

Prime Minister Narendra Modi ended his campaign by stating that Tripura deserves a diamond but in order to get it, it must let go of the manik ('semi-precious stone' in Bengali, also a word play on the name of incumbent CM Manik Sarkar) stuck to it.

== Exit Polls ==
Polling firm	Date published				
Polling firm	Date published	BJP+	CPI(M)+	INC	Others
JanKiBaat-NewsX	27 January 2018	35-45	14–23	-	-
CVoter	27 January 2018	24–32	26-34	0–2	-
AxisMyIndia	27 January 2018	44-50	9–15	-	0–3
Dinraat	27 January 2018	10-19	40-49		

== Results ==
The incumbent Left Front government was defeated after 25 years of office out of which Manik Sarkar served for about 20 years, with the Bharatiya Janata Party and Indigenous Peoples Front of Tripura winning a large majority of seats. The Indian National Congress, which was the second largest party in the 2013 election, lost all its seats and most of its vote share.

=== Results by alliance and party ===
Alliance	Party	Popular vote			Seats		
Alliance	Party	Votes	%	±pp	Contested	Won	+/−
NDA	Bharatiya Janata Party (BJP)	1,025,673	43.59%	▲42.05	51	36	▲36
NDA	Indigenous Peoples Front of Tripura (IPFT)	173,603	7.38%	▼0.21	9	8	▲8
NDA	Total	1,199,276	50.97%	▲41.84	60	44	▲44
Left Front	Communist Party of India (Marxist) (CPM)	993,605	42.22%	▼5.89	57	16	▼33
Left Front	Communist Party of India (CPI)	19,352	0.82%	▼0.75	1	0	▼1
Left Front	Revolutionary Socialist Party (RSP)	17,568	0.75%	▼1.2	1	0	Steady
Left Front	All India Forward Bloc (AIFB)	13,115	0.56%	▼0.14	1	0	Steady
Left Front	Total	1,043,640	44.35	▼7.84	60	16	▼34
None	Indian National Congress (INC)	42,100	1.79%	▼34.74	59	0	▼10
None	Indigenous Nationalist Party of Twipra (INPT)	16,940	0.72%	▼6.87	15	0	Steady
None	All India Trinamool Congress (AITC)	6,989	0.3%		24	0	Steady
None	Independents (IND)				25	0	Steady
None	Other parties and coalitions					0	Steady
None	None of the Above (NOTA)	24,220	1.03%				
Total		2,353,246	100.00		60		±0
Valid votes		23,53,246	99.81				
Invalid votes		4,474	0.19				
Votes cast / turnout		23,57,720	91.38				
Abstentions		2,22,393	8.62				
Registered voters		25,80,113					

=== Results by District ===
District	Total			
District	Total	BJP	IPFT	CPM
West Tripura	14	12	2	—N/a
Sipahijala	9	3	1	5
Khowai	6	3	2	1
Gomati	7	5	1	1
South Tripura	7	3	—N/a	4
Dhalai	6	5	1	—N/a
Unakoti	4	2	—N/a	2
North Tripura	7	3	1	3
Total	60	36	8	16

=== Results by constituency ===
Winner, runner-up, voter turnout, and victory margin in every constituency
Assembly Constituency		Turnout	Winner				Runner Up				Margin
#k	Names	%	Candidate	Party	Votes	%	Candidate	Party	Votes	%	Margin
1	Simna	91.92	Brishaketu Debbarma	IPFT	15,977	48.15	Pranab Debbarma	CPI(M)	14,014	42.23	1,963
2	Mohanpur	93.53	Ratan Lal Nath	BJP	22,516	54.43	Subhas Chandra Debnath	CPI(M)	17,340	41.91	5,176
3	Bamutia	94.29	Krishnadhan Das	BJP	20,014	49.15	Haricharan Sarkar	CPI(M)	19,042	46.76	972
4	Barjala	92.76	Dr. Dilip Kumar Das	BJP	22,052	55.42	Jhumu Sarkar	CPI(M)	15,825	39.77	6,227
5	Khayerpur	94.37	Ratan Chakraborty	BJP	25,496	55.86	Pabitra Kar	CPI(M)	18,457	40.44	7,039
6	Agartala	90.73	Sudip Roy Barman	BJP	25,234	55.47	Krishna Majumder	CPI(M)	17,852	39.24	7,382
7	Ramnagar	88.44	Surajit Datta	BJP	21,092	53.51	Ratan Das	CPI(M)	16,237	41.19	4,855
8	Town Bordowali	85.97	Ashish Kumar Saha	BJP	24,293	60.33	Biswanath Saha	AIFB	13,115	32.57	11,178
9	Banamalipur	87.37	Biplab Kumar Deb	BJP	21,755	59.89	Amal Chakraborty	CPI(M)	12,206	33.6	9,549
10	Majlishpur	94.76	Sushanta Chowdhury	BJP	23,249	52.41	Manik Dey	CPI(M)	19,359	43.64	3,890
11	Mandaibazar	91.13	Dhirendra Debbarma	IPFT	21,381	51.94	Manoranjan Debbarma	CPI(M)	15,517	37.7	5,864
12	Takarjala	88.23	Narendra Chandra Debbarma	IPFT	22,056	61.9	Ramendra Debbarma	CPI(M)	9,404	26.39	12,652
13	Pratapgarh	94.86	Rebati Mohan Das	BJP	25,834	51.1	Ramu Das	CPI(M)	22,686	44.87	3,148
14	Badharghat	92.1	Dilip Sarkar	BJP	28,561	52.86	Jharna Das(Baidya)	CPI(M)	23,113	42.78	5,448
15	Kamalasagar	93.09	Narayan Chandra Chowdhury	CPI(M)	18,847	49.99	Arun Bhowmik	BJP	16,968	45.	1,879
16	Bishalgarh	94.04	Bhanu Lal Saha	CPI(M)	21,254	48.43	Nitai Chowdhury	BJP	20,488	46.68	766
17	Golaghati	93.46	Birendra Kishore Debbarma	BJP	19,228	52.62	Kesab Debbarma	CPI(M)	15,730	43.05	3,498
18	Suryamaninagar	94.47	Ram Prasad Paul	BJP	24,874	52.78	Rajkumar Chowdhury	CPI(M)	20,307	43.09	4,567
19	Charilam	80.55	Jishnu Dev Varma	BJP	26,580	90.81	Palash Debbarma	CPI(M)	1,030	3.52	25,550
20	Boxanagar	90.85	Sahid Chowdhury	CPI(M)	19,862	57.69	Baharul Islam Majumder	BJP	11,847	34.41	8,015
21	Nalchar	94.48	Subhash Chandra Das	BJP	19,261	48.48	Tapan Chandra Das	CPI(M)	18,810	47.34	451
22	Sonamura	90.95	Shyamal Chakraborty	CPI(M)	19,275	51.65	Subal Bhowmik	BJP	15,843	42.46	3,432
23	Dhanpur	92.62	Manik Sarkar	CPI(M)	22,176	54.43	Pratima Bhoumik	BJP	16,735	41.08	5,441
24	Ramchandraghat	92.11	Prasanta Debbarma	IPFT	19,439	53.3	Padma Kumar Debbarma	CPI(M)	15,204	41.69	4,235
25	Khowai	95.55	Nirmal Biswas	CPI(M)	20,629	51.57	Amit Rakshit	BJP	17,893	44.73	2,736
26	Asharambari	91.77	Mevar Kumar Jamatia	IPFT	19,188	57.34	Aghore Debbarma	CPI(M)	12,201	36.46	6,987
27	Kalyanpur–Pramodenagar	91.68	Pinaki Das Chowdhury	BJP	20,293	52.01	Manindra Chandra Das	CPI(M)	17,152	43.96	3,141
28	Teliamura	89.98	Kalyani Saha Roy	BJP	22,077	56.37	Gouri Das	CPI(M)	14,898	38.04	7,179
29	Krishnapur	91.8	Atul Debbarma	BJP	16,730	51.21	Khagendra Jamatia	CPI(M)	14,735	45.11	1,995
30	Bagma	91.42	Ram Pada Jamatia	BJP	24,074	50.85	Naresh Chandra Jamatia	CPI(M)	21,241	44.87	2,833
31	Radhakishorpur	92.36	Pranjit Singha Roy	BJP	22,414	52.54	Srikanta Datta	RSP	17,568	41.18	4,846
32	Matarbari	92.69	Biplab Kumar Ghosh	BJP	23,069	49.79	Madhab Chandra Saha	CPI(M)	21,500	46.4	1,569
33	Kakraban–Salgarh	92.58	Ratan Kumar Bhowmik	CPI(M)	24,835	52.95	Jitendra Majumder	BJP	21,068	44.92	3,767
34	Rajnagar	91.	Sudhan Das	CPI(M)	22,004	55.28	Bibhishan Chandra Das	BJP	16,291	40.93	5,713
35	Belonia	94.05	Arun Chandra Bhaumik	BJP	19,307	48.45	Basudev Majumder	CPI(M)	18,554	46.56	753
36	Santirbazar	93.22	Pramod Reang	BJP	21,701	50.88	Manindra Reang	CPI	19,352	45.37	2,349
37	Hrishyamukh	93.4	Badal Chowdhury	CPI(M)	22,673	55.84	Ashesh Baidya	BJP	16,343	40.25	6,330
38	Jolaibari	94.32	Jashabir Tripura	CPI(M)	21,160	49.59	Ankya Mog Chowdhury	BJP	19,592	45.92	1,568
39	Manu	94.35	Pravat Chowdhury	CPI(M)	19,432	47.62	Dhananjoy Tripura	IPFT	19,239	47.15	193
40	Sabroom	93.72	Sankar Roy	BJP	21,059	50.64	Rita Kar Majumder	CPI(M)	18,877	45.39	2,182
41	Ampinagar	90.69	Sindhu Chandra Jamatia	IPFT	18,202	53.47	Daniel Jamatia	CPI(M)	13,255	38.94	4,947
42	Amarpur	94.05	Ranjit Das	BJP	18,970	48.87	Parimal Debnath	CPI(M)	17,954	46.25	1,016
43	Karbook	92.02	Burba Mohan Tripura	BJP	15,622	48.86	Priyamani Debbarma	CPI(M)	14,825	46.37	797
44	Raima Valley	91.07	Dhananjoy Tripura	IPFT	18,673	46.93	Lalit Mohan Tripura	CPI(M)	16,751	42.1	1,922
45	Kamalpur	90.68	Manoj Kanti Deb	BJP	20,165	52.11	Bijoy Laxmi Singha	CPI(M)	17,206	44.46	2,959
46	Surma	90.43	Ashis Das	BJP	20,767	51.48	Anjan Das	CPI(M)	18,057	44.76	2,710
47	Ambassa	91.01	Parimal Debbarma	BJP	20,842	49.42	Bharat Reang	CPI(M)	17,257	40.92	3,585
48	Karamcherra	90.03	Diba Chandra Hrangkhawl	BJP	19,397	55.59	Umakanta Tripura	CPI(M)	12,061	34.57	7,336
49	Chawamanu	89.69	Sambhu Lal Chakma	BJP	18,290	52.3	Nirajoy Tripura	CPI(M)	14,535	41.56	3,755
50	Pabiachhara	91.11	Bhagaban Das	BJP	22,815	54.53	Samiran Malakar	CPI(M)	16,988	40.6	5,827
51	Fatikroy	89.67	Sudhangshu Das	BJP	19,512	51.39	Tunubala Malakar	CPI(M)	16,683	43.94	2,829
52	Chandipur	90.22	Tapan Chakraborty	CPI(M)	18,545	47.48	Kaberi Singha	BJP	18,143	46.45	402
53	Kailashahar	86.39	Moboshar Ali	CPI(M)	18,093	45.02	Nitish De	BJP	13,259	32.99	4,834
54	Kadamtala–Kurti	88.28	Islam Uddin	CPI(M)	20,721	56.84	Tinku Roy	BJP	13,839	37.96	6,882
55	Bagbassa	86.74	Bijita Nath	CPI(M)	18,001	48.09	Pradip Kumar Nath	BJP	17,731	47.37	270
56	Dharmanagar	88.38	Biswa Bandhu Sen	BJP	21,357	57.21	Abhijit De	CPI(M)	14,070	37.69	7,287
57	Jubarajnagar	90.59	Ramendra Chandra Debnath	CPI(M)	18,147	48.54	Jadab Lal Debnath	BJP	17,498	46.8	649
58	Panisagar	89.5	Binay Bhushan Das	BJP	15,892	48.54	Ajit Kumar Das	CPI(M)	15,331	46.83	561
59	Pencharthal	89.05	Santana Chakma	BJP	17,743	49.38	Anil Chakma	CPI(M)	16,370	45.56	1,373
60	Kanchanpur	88.18	Prem Kumar Reang	IPFT	19,448	51.76	Rajendra Reang	CPI(M)	15,317	40.76	4,131

== Highlights ==
=== No. of constituencies ===
Type of Constituencies	GEN	SC	ST	Total
No. of Constituencies	30	10	20	60

=== Electors ===
	Men	Women	Third gender	Total
No.of Electors	1,311,983	1,268,119	11	2,580,113
No.of Electors who Voted	1,146,889	1,159,086	2	2,305,977
Polling Percentage	87.42%	91.40%	18.00%	89.38%

=== Performance of women candidates ===
	Men	Women	Total
No.of Contestants	273	24	297
Elected	57	03	60

== Reactions ==
The BJP chose Biplab Kumar Deb to be the next Chief Minister. He said: "I am ready to take the responsibility. I will not run away from taking the responsibility. I have already been given a bigger responsibility, the party's state presidentship, which I have been fulfilling to the best of my ability. People responded favourably to our call 'Chalo Paltai' (let's change)." He claimed that having the same party in the central government and at the state level "helps in faster development." He further called for restraint in post-electoral violence: "We do not believe in the politics of vengeance and hatred, so we appeal to the people to maintain peace and calm." In addition he asserted that "the word development does not exist in the dictionary of the CPI-M. Our government will provide good governance and time-bound implementation of all developmental works."

Former Chief Minister of Kerala and senior CPI(M) leader V. S. Achuthanandan called for the party's leadership to ally with "secular forces" to defeat the Sangh Parivar: "The country is facing serious challenges. The Congress, which had ruled for decades in the post-independence period, has become weaker now. He supported party General Secretary Sitaram Yechury's call for an "understanding" with the INC as "a tactical move with secular forces was necessary." The party's provincial minister claimed that the BJP had "misused" money and power at the central government in winning the election and that the "challenge to the democracy and the national integrity." Another CPM figure M. V. Jayarajan, private secretary to Kerala Chief Minister Pinarayi Vijayan, claimed that the INC voters and leaders were moving towards the BJP and that the result should "not be viewed lightly and all the patriots in the country have the responsibility to check and isolate any effort of the communal forces gaining strength in the country. Politburo member M. A. Baby said that while the result was "unexpected", he did "respect the verdict of the people." He added: "However, there is a decline of 6-7 per cent vote share of the Left front. It's a concern...how the erosion has taken place and why this happened will be dispassionately examined by the party in Tripura and the national leadership."

Assam Minister Himanta Biswa Sarma derogatorily called for Manik Sarkar to be deported to Bangladesh following CPI(M)'s defeat after it was revealed that in spite of being in power for 20 years, Sarkar didn't own a home in his name. Sarma had also made the same comments during campaign, which represents the long-standing hatred & disdain of the Assamese Hindu population towards both Bengali Muslims & Bengali Hindus.

BJP's victory in a Communist-ruled state having a Bengali Hindu majority (who had been long stereotyped of being largely averse to Hindu right wing ideology) had possible implications for the political scenario of West Bengal, as it represented the rising acceptability of BJP to the Bengali Hindu society at the cost of the decline of Communist ideology. These concerns were proven true when BJP made massive inroads into the state in the next year's Lok Sabha elections, ultimately culminating in its ascent in 2026.

On 5th March 2018, 2 days after declaration of the polling results, a colossal statue of Vladimir Lenin installed by the Communist government in 2013 at Belonia was razed to the ground using a bulldozer by a mob of jubilant BJP supporters. On the next day, a similar incident of BJP supporters demolishing another Lenin's statue was reported at Sabroom.

== Charilam bypoll ==
Polling for the seat of Charilam was postponed to 12 March 2018 after the death of Communist Party of India (Marxist) incumbent candidate Ramendra Narayan Debbarma. The CPI(M) withdrew their candidate for the bypoll claiming that there was an increase in violence.

Despite this, the CPI(M) candidate continued to be present on the ballot paper, and subsequently lost their deposit.

Tripura Legislative Assembly Bypoll, 2018: Charilam
Party	Candidate	Votes	%	±%
BJP	Jishnu Dev Varma	26,580	90.81	
CPI(M)	Palash Debbarma	1,030	3.51	
INC	Arjun Debbarma	775	2.64	
INPT	Uma Shankar Debbarma	685	2.34	
Independent	Jyotilal Debbarma	198	0.67	N/A
Majority		25,550	87.29	
Turnout				
Registered electors				
BJP gain from CPI(M)		Swing		

== See also ==
- Elections in India
- 2018 elections in India
- Tripura Legislative Assembly
