= N. C. Debbarma =

Indian politician (1942–2023)

Narendra Chandra Debbarma
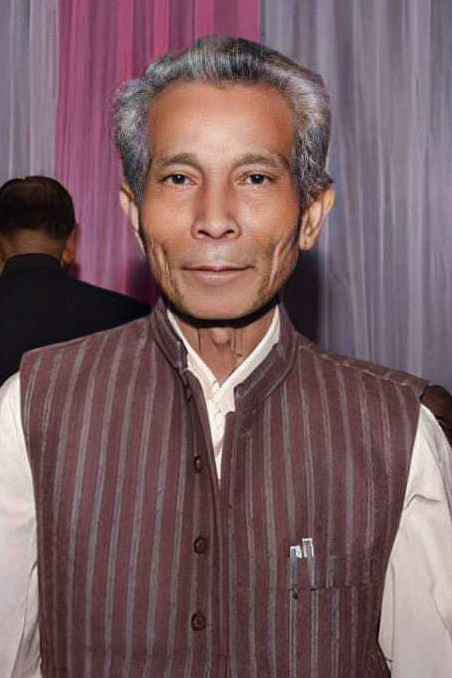
- N.C. Debbarma in 2018

Minister for Land & Revenue, Forests, and Fisheries, Government of Tripura
- In office 9 March 2018 – 1 January 2023
- Chief Minister: Biplab Kumar Deb; Manik Saha
- Succeeded by: Manik Saha Animesh Debbarma Sudhangshu Das

Member of the Tripura Legislative Assembly
- In office 3 March 2018 – 1 January 2023
- Preceded by: Niranjan Debbarma
- Succeeded by: Biswajit Kalai
- Constituency: Takarjala

Personal details
- Born: Narendra Chandra Debbarma; 28 August 1942 Khowai, Tripura, India
- Died: 1 January 2023 (aged 80) Agartala, Tripura, India
- Party: Indigenous Peoples Front of Tripura
- Spouse: Lt. Shova Debbarma
- Education: University of Calcutta
- Occupation: Politician, Former Director of All India Radio

Narendra Chandra Debbarma (28 August 1942 – 1 January 2023) was an Indian politician who was the president of the Indigenous Peoples Front of Tripura and director of All India Radio, Agartala. He was also a cabinet minister of Tripura Government from 2018 to 2023.

Debbarma allied his party with the BJP in the 2018 Tripura Legislative Assembly election and won 8 seats out of 9 which constituted 7.5% of the total votes polled.

== Positions held ==
- President, Indigenous People's Front of Tripura (2000–2023)
- Minister of Land & Revenue, Fisheries, and Forests (2018–2023)
- Member, Tripura State Planning Board (2019–2023)
- Station Director, All India Radio, Agartala (till 2002)

== Public recognition ==
N.C. Debbarma was posthumously conferred with the Padma Shri Award for Public Affairs.

== Death ==
Debbarma died at Agartala Hospital on 1 January 2023, at the age of 80 after he suffered a massive cerebral stroke.

== Contribution to writings ==
- Koklam (A handbook of spoken Kokborok) published by Directorate of Research, Department of Welfare for Scheduled Tribes and Scheduled Castes, Government of Tripura.
- Role of folk literature and culture in human civilization as a contribution of articles for the Centenary Celebration of the Kokborok language of the state held during 22–24 December 2000.
- Contributed in publishing of Book on Customary laws of the Tripuris, Jamatia, Mogs and Reangs of Tripura with special reference to their land holding system as a Research Officer.
