= Pathan Lal Jamatia =

Indian politician (born 1982)

Member of the Tripura Legislative Assembly
- Preceded by: Sindhu Chandra Jamatia
- Constituency: Ampinagar

Personal details
- Born: 9 May 1981 (age 45)
- Party: Tipra Motha Party
- Education: Tripura University (BA, MA)
- Occupation: Politician; Teacher

Pathan Lal Jamatia (born 1982) is an Indian politician from Tripura. He is an MLA from the Ampinagar Assembly constituency, which is reserved for Scheduled Tribe community, in Gomati District. He won the 2023 Tripura Legislative Assembly election, representing the Tipra Motha Party.

== Early life and education ==
Jamatia is from Krishnapur, Gomati District, Tripura. He is the son of the late Bichitra Sadhan Jamatia. He completed his M.A. in education in 2007 at Tripura University. His wife is a teacher in a private school.

== Career ==
Jamatia won from the Ampinagar Assembly constituency representing the Tipra Motha Party in the 2023 Tripura Legislative Assembly election. He polled 21,525 votes and defeated his nearest rival, Patal Kanya Jamatia of the Bharatiya Janata Party, by a margin of 12,186 votes.
