= Ramchandraghat Assembly constituency =

Legislative Assembly constituency in Tripura State, India

Coordinates: 24.02°N 91.61°E

Ramchandraghat
- Constituency No. 24 for the Tripura Legislative Assembly

Constituency details
- Country: India
- Region: Northeast India
- State: Tripura
- District: Khowai
- Lok Sabha constituency: Tripura East
- Established: 1977
- Total electors: 41,608
- Reservation: ST

Member of Legislative Assembly
- 13th Tripura Legislative Assembly
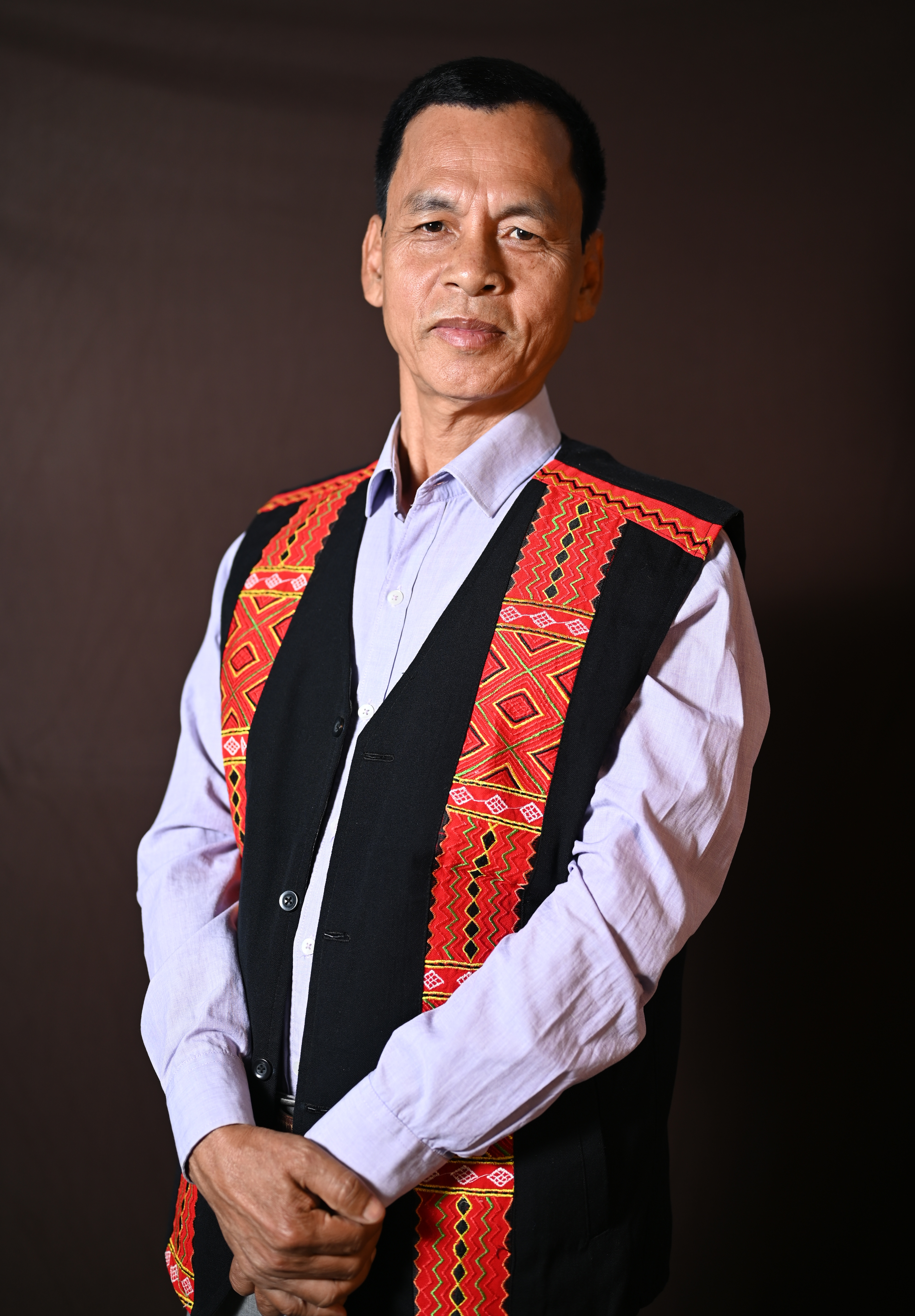
- Incumbent Ranjit Debbarma
- Party: TMP
- Alliance: NDA
- Elected year: 2023

Ramchandraghat is one of the 60 Legislative Assembly constituencies of Tripura state in India. It is in Khowai district and is reserved for candidates belonging to the Scheduled Tribes. It is also part of East Tripura Lok Sabha constituency.

== Members of the Legislative Assembly ==
Election	Member	Party
1977	Dasarath Deb	Communist Party of India
1983	Dasarath Deb	Communist Party of India
1988	Dasarath Deb	Communist Party of India
1993	Dasarath Deb	Communist Party of India
1998	Padma Kumar Debbarma	Communist Party of India
2003	Padma Kumar Debbarma	Communist Party of India
2008	Padma Kumar Debbarma	Communist Party of India
2013	Padma Kumar Debbarma	Communist Party of India
2018	Prasanta Debbarma	Indigenous People's Front of Tripura
2023	Ranjit Debbarma	Tipra Motha Party

== Election results ==
=== 2023 Assembly election ===
2023 Tripura Legislative Assembly election: Ramchandraghat
Party	Candidate	Votes	%	±%
TMP	Ranjit Debbarma	23,143	60.87%	New
CPI(M)	Ranjit Debbarma	6,941	18.26%	▼23.43
Independent	Sanjib Debbarma	6,010	15.81%	New
IPFT	Prasanta Debbarma	932	2.45%	▼50.85
Independent	Sahajit Debbarma	598	1.57%	New
NOTA	None of the Above	394	1.04%	▼0.04
Margin of victory		16,202	42.62%	▲31.01
Turnout		38,018	91.52%	▼1.75
Registered electors		41,608		▲6.24
TMP gain from IPFT		Swing	▲7.58	

=== 2018 Assembly election ===
2018 Tripura Legislative Assembly election: Ramchandraghat
Party	Candidate	Votes	%	±%
IPFT	Prasanta Debbarma	19,439	53.30%	New
CPI(M)	Padma Kumar Debbarma	15,204	41.69%	▼17.46
Independent	Animesh Debbarma	603	1.65%	New
INC	Tarani Debbarma	398	1.09%	New
NOTA	None of the Above	391	1.07%	New
Margin of victory		4,235	11.61%	▼12.32
Turnout		36,472	92.11%	▲0.21
Registered electors		39,165		▲10.36
IPFT gain from CPI(M)		Swing	▼5.85	

=== 2013 Assembly election ===
2013 Tripura Legislative Assembly election: Ramchandraghat
Party	Candidate	Votes	%	±%
CPI(M)	Padma Kumar Debbarma	19,504	59.15%	▼0.07
Independent	Animesh Debbarma	11,613	35.22%	New
INPT	Ananta Debbarma	1,016	3.08%	▼8.38
Independent	Shib Chandra Debbarma	842	2.55%	New
Margin of victory		7,891	23.93%	▼9.24
Turnout		32,975	93.07%	▲1.15
Registered electors		35,490		
CPI(M) hold		Swing	▼0.07	

=== 2008 Assembly election ===
2008 Tripura Legislative Assembly election: Ramchandraghat
Party	Candidate	Votes	%	±%
CPI(M)	Padma Kumar Debbarma	11,611	59.22%	▼0.81
Independent	Animesh Debbarma	5,108	26.05%	New
INPT	Ananta Debbarma	2,248	11.47%	▼25.67
Independent	Nihar Debbarma	258	1.32%	New
AITC	Renu Debbarma	185	0.94%	New
Independent	Chira Kumar Debbarma	108	0.55%	New
Margin of victory		6,503	33.17%	▲10.27
Turnout		19,607	91.85%	▲15.23
Registered electors		21,367		
CPI(M) hold		Swing	▼0.81	

=== 2003 Assembly election ===
2003 Tripura Legislative Assembly election: Ramchandraghat
Party	Candidate	Votes	%	±%
CPI(M)	Padma Kumar Debbarma	9,003	60.03%	▼13.26
INPT	Ananta Debbarma	5,569	37.13%	New
LJP	Pradip Munda	426	2.84%	New
Margin of victory		3,434	22.90%	▼29.87
Turnout		14,998	76.59%	▲12.92
Registered electors		19,598		▼0.16
CPI(M) hold		Swing		

=== 1998 Assembly election ===
1998 Tripura Legislative Assembly election: Ramchandraghat
Party	Candidate	Votes	%	±%
CPI(M)	Padma Kumar Debbarma	9,151	73.29%	▼5.25
Independent	Subodh Debbarma	2,563	20.53%	New
BJP	Samir Debbarma	772	6.18%	New
Margin of victory		6,588	52.76%	▼11.20
Turnout		12,486	65.77%	▼19.64
Registered electors		19,629		▲0.34
CPI(M) hold		Swing		

=== 1993 Assembly election ===
1993 Tripura Legislative Assembly election: Ramchandraghat
Party	Candidate	Votes	%	±%
CPI(M)	Dasarath Deb	12,790	78.54%	▲0.36
TUS	Dinesh Debbarma	2,374	14.58%	▼6.50
Independent	Promode Debbarma	668	4.10%	New
AMB	Ranita Sangma	391	2.40%	New
Margin of victory		10,416	63.96%	▲6.86
Turnout		16,285	84.22%	▼4.21
Registered electors		19,562		▲18.30
CPI(M) hold		Swing	▲0.36	

=== 1988 Assembly election ===
1988 Tripura Legislative Assembly election: Ramchandraghat
Party	Candidate	Votes	%	±%
CPI(M)	Dasarath Deb	11,306	78.18%	▼8.71
TUS	Sashi Kumar Debbarma	3,048	21.08%	▲7.96
Independent	Sishu Ranjan Roy	108	0.75%	New
Margin of victory		8,258	57.10%	▼16.68
Turnout		14,462	88.40%	▲1.22
Registered electors		16,536		▲8.20
CPI(M) hold		Swing		

=== 1983 Assembly election ===
1983 Tripura Legislative Assembly election: Ramchandraghat
Party	Candidate	Votes	%	±%
CPI(M)	Dasarath Deb	11,451	86.89%	▲5.31
TUS	Bathsailyamani Jamatia	1,728	13.11%	▲7.39
Margin of victory		9,723	73.78%	▲2.13
Turnout		13,179	87.55%	▼2.09
Registered electors		15,283		▲14.88
CPI(M) hold		Swing		

=== 1977 Assembly election ===
1977 Tripura Legislative Assembly election: Ramchandraghat
Party	Candidate	Votes	%	±%
CPI(M)	Dasarath Deb	9,585	81.57%	New
JP	Nand Kumar Debbarma	1,166	9.92%	New
TUS	Chitta Debbarma	672	5.72%	New
INC	Rabindra Debbarma	238	2.03%	New
TPCC	Manindra Chandra Debbarma	89	0.76%	New
Margin of victory		8,419	71.65%	
Turnout		11,750	89.22%	
Registered electors		13,303		
CPI(M) win (new seat)				

== See also ==
- List of constituencies of the Tripura Legislative Assembly
- Khowai district
- Ramchandraghat
- Tripura East (Lok Sabha constituency)
