= Golaghati Assembly constituency =

Legislative Assembly constituency in Tripura State, India

Coordinates: 23.69°N 91.36°E

Golaghat
- Constituency No. 17 for the Tripura Legislative Assembly

Constituency details
- Country: India
- Region: Northeast India
- State: Tripura
- District: Sipahijala
- Lok Sabha constituency: Tripura West
- Established: 1977
- Total electors: 42,531
- Reservation: ST

Member of Legislative Assembly
- 13th Tripura Legislative Assembly
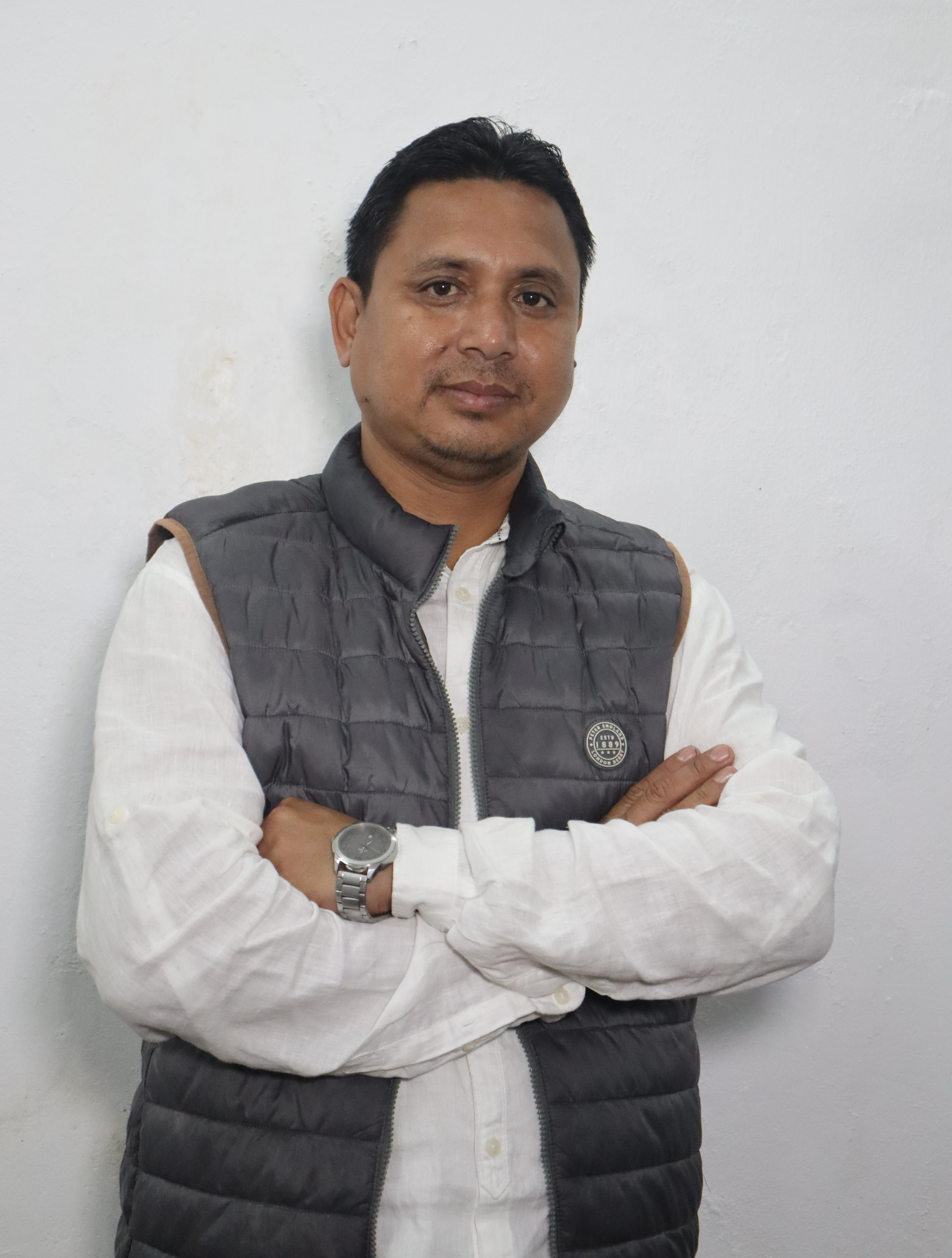
- Incumbent Manav Debbarma
- Party: TMP
- Alliance: NDA
- Elected year: 2023

Golaghati is one of the 60 Legislative Assembly constituencies of Tripura state in India. It is in Sipahijala district and is reserved for candidates belonging to the Scheduled Tribes. It is also part of West Tripura Lok Sabha constituency.

== Members of the Legislative Assembly ==
Election	Member	Party
1977	Niranjan Debbarma	Communist Party of India
1983	Budha Debbarma	Tripura Upajati Juba Samiti
1988	Budha Debbarma	Tripura Upajati Juba Samiti
1993	Niranjan Debbarma	Communist Party of India
1998	Niranjan Debbarma	Communist Party of India
2003	Ashok Debbarma	Indian National Congress
2008	Kesab Debbarma	Communist Party of India
2013	Kesab Debbarma	Communist Party of India
2018	Birendra Kishore Debbarma	Bharatiya Janata Party
2023	Manav Debbarma	Tipra Motha Party

== Election results ==
=== 2023 Assembly election ===
2023 Tripura Legislative Assembly election: Golaghati
Party	Candidate	Votes	%	±%
TMP	Manav Debbarma	19,800	50.79%	New
BJP	Himani Debbarma	10,602	27.20%	▼25.42
CPI(M)	Brinda Rani Debbarma	7,606	19.51%	New
NOTA	None of the Above	524	1.34%	▲0.13
RPI(A)	Amit Kumar Debbarma	449	1.15%	New
Margin of victory		9,198	23.60%	▲14.02
Turnout		38,981	92.02%	▼1.91
Registered electors		42,531		▲8.91
TMP gain from BJP		Swing	▼1.83	

=== 2018 Assembly election ===
2018 Tripura Legislative Assembly election: Golaghati
Party	Candidate	Votes	%	±%
BJP	Birendra Kishore Debbarma	19,228	52.62%	New
CPI(M)	Kesab Debbarma	15,730	43.05%	▼12.50
INC	Nishi Kanta Debbarma	472	1.29%	New
NOTA	None of the Above	445	1.22%	New
INPT	Manab Debbarma	426	1.17%	▼41.25
Margin of victory		3,498	9.57%	▼3.55
Turnout		36,540	93.46%	▼0.06
Registered electors		39,052		▲5.88
BJP gain from CPI(M)		Swing	▼2.92	

=== 2013 Assembly election ===
2013 Tripura Legislative Assembly election: Golaghati
Party	Candidate	Votes	%	±%
CPI(M)	Kesab Debbarma	19,181	55.55%	▲1.50
INPT	Manab Debbarma	14,648	42.42%	New
IPFT	Budhu Kumar Debbarma	703	2.04%	New
Margin of victory		4,533	13.13%	▲1.59
Turnout		34,532	94.08%	▲0.56
Registered electors		36,883		
CPI(M) hold		Swing		

=== 2008 Assembly election ===
2008 Tripura Legislative Assembly election: Golaghati
Party	Candidate	Votes	%	±%
CPI(M)	Kesab Debbarma	13,990	54.04%	▲5.50
INC	Ashok Debbarma	11,003	42.51%	▼6.04
Independent	Santi Kumar Debbarma	356	1.38%	New
AITC	Suchitra Debbarma	315	1.22%	New
Independent	Kartik Kanya Debbarma	222	0.86%	New
Margin of victory		2,987	11.54%	▲11.53
Turnout		25,886	93.29%	▲21.30
Registered electors		27,815		
CPI(M) gain from INC		Swing	▲5.50	

=== 2003 Assembly election ===
2003 Tripura Legislative Assembly election: Golaghati
Party	Candidate	Votes	%	±%
INC	Ashok Debbarma	10,080	48.55%	▲3.14
CPI(M)	Niranjan Debbarma	10,079	48.54%	▼1.14
LJP	Gopal Debbarma	605	2.91%	New
Margin of victory		1	0.00%	▼4.27
Turnout		20,764	71.86%	▼6.87
Registered electors		28,933		▲2.50
INC gain from CPI(M)		Swing		

=== 1998 Assembly election ===
1998 Tripura Legislative Assembly election: Golaghati
Party	Candidate	Votes	%	±%
CPI(M)	Niranjan Debbarma	11,028	49.68%	▼0.61
INC	Ashok Debbarma	10,079	45.41%	New
BJP	Budha Debbarma	858	3.87%	▲2.43
Independent	Sridam Debbarma	232	1.05%	New
Margin of victory		949	4.28%	▼11.17
Turnout		22,197	80.39%	▲2.30
Registered electors		28,228		▲3.55
CPI(M) hold		Swing	▼0.61	

=== 1993 Assembly election ===
1993 Tripura Legislative Assembly election: Golaghati
Party	Candidate	Votes	%	±%
CPI(M)	Niranjan Debbarma	10,465	50.29%	▲1.76
TUS	Budha Debbarma	7,251	34.85%	▼13.73
Independent	Bijoy Kumar Hrangkhal	2,555	12.28%	New
BJP	Bishu Kumar Debbarma	299	1.44%	New
Margin of victory		3,214	15.45%	▲15.40
Turnout		20,809	77.87%	▼6.11
Registered electors		27,260		▲19.43
CPI(M) gain from TUS		Swing	▲1.71	

=== 1988 Assembly election ===
1988 Tripura Legislative Assembly election: Golaghati
Party	Candidate	Votes	%	±%
TUS	Budha Debbarma	9,141	48.58%	▼1.61
CPI(M)	Niranjan Debbarma	9,132	48.53%	▲3.44
Independent	Rati Rajan Das	470	2.50%	New
Margin of victory		9	0.05%	▼5.05
Turnout		18,817	83.65%	▲1.86
Registered electors		22,825		▲15.22
TUS hold		Swing		

=== 1983 Assembly election ===
1983 Tripura Legislative Assembly election: Golaghati
Party	Candidate	Votes	%	±%
TUS	Budha Debbarma	8,011	50.18%	▲26.44
CPI(M)	Niranjan Debbarma	7,198	45.09%	▲13.24
Independent	Promode Behari Majumder	754	4.72%	New
Margin of victory		813	5.09%	▼3.02
Turnout		15,963	81.76%	▲1.33
Registered electors		19,810		▲17.55
TUS gain from CPI(M)		Swing		

=== 1977 Assembly election ===
1977 Tripura Legislative Assembly election: Golaghati
Party	Candidate	Votes	%	±%
CPI(M)	Niranjan Debbarma	4,254	31.85%	New
TUS	Budha Debbarma	3,171	23.74%	New
INC	Ashok Debbarma	2,146	16.07%	New
TPCC	Anil Kishore Debbarma	1,767	13.23%	New
JP	Narendra Debbarma	1,542	11.55%	New
CPI	Aghore Debbarma	446	3.34%	New
Margin of victory		1,083	8.11%	
Turnout		13,355	80.92%	
Registered electors		16,852		
CPI(M) win (new seat)				

== See also ==
- List of constituencies of the Tripura Legislative Assembly
- Sipahijala district
- Tripura West (Lok Sabha constituency)
