= Rajeshwar Debbarma =

Indian politician from Tripura

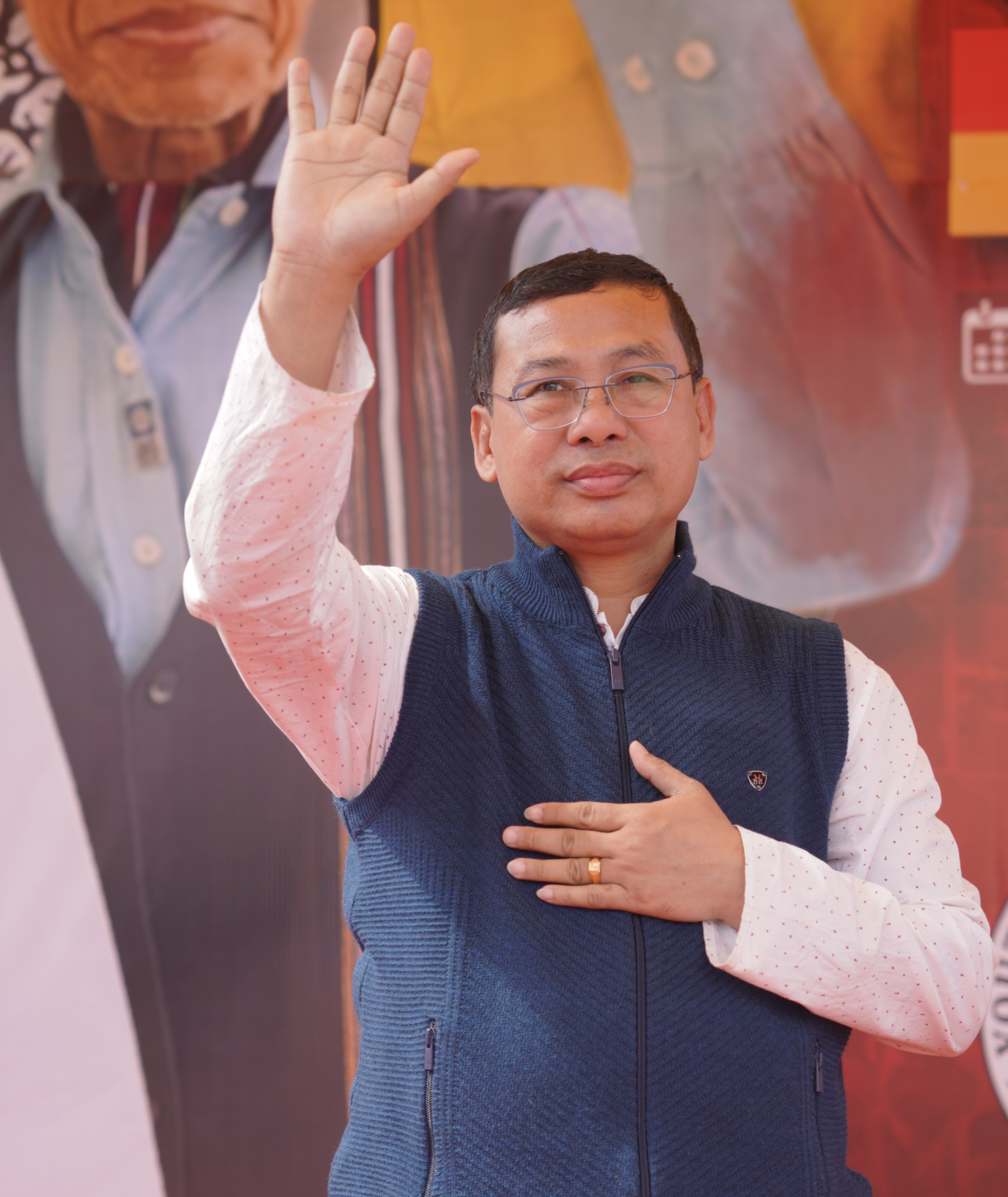
- Rajeshwar Debbarma in 2024

Member of the Tripura Legislative Assembly
- In office 2003–2008
- Succeeded by: Niranjan Debbarma
- Constituency: Takarjala

Personal details
- Born: Tripura, India
- Party: TIPRA Motha Party
- Other political affiliations: Indian National Congress; Indigenous People's Front of Tripura
- Spouse: Merry Rupini
- Education: B.A. Arts
- Alma mater: Krishna Kanta Handiqui State Open University, Guwahati

Rajeshwar Debbarma is a Tiprasa Indian politician from Tripura and a leader of the Tipra Motha Party (TMP). He was a Member of the Tripura Legislative Assembly from 2003 to 2008 representing Takarjala Assembly Constituency as a candidate of the Indigenous Nationalist Party of Twipra. As of 2025, Debbarma is one of the senior spokesperson of the TMP.

== Political career ==
Rajeshwar Debbarma began his political career as a member of the Indigenous Nationalist Party of Twipra (INPT) in the early 2000s. He was elected as a Member of Legislative Assembly from the Takarjala Constituency.

Rajeshwar joined the Indian National Congress after repeated defeats of the INPT in subsequent elections. He joined the Bharatiya Janata Party after it came to power in 2018.

However, Rajeshwar quit the BJP in 2019 in protest against the controversial Citizenship (Amendment) Act, 2019. Rajeshwar then joined the TIPRA, having worked with its founder Pradyot Bikram Manikya Deb Barma over the years. He was appointed as political secretary and has been one of the top advisors in the party.
