= Daniel Jamatia =

Indian politician

Member of Tripura Legislative Assembly
- In office 2008–2018
- Preceded by: Nagendra Jamatia
- Succeeded by: Sindhu Chandra Jamatia
- Constituency: Ampinagar

Personal details
- Born: 18 October 1963 (age 62) Ampinagar, South Tripura
- Party: Communist Party of India (Marxist)
- Spouse: Chwngrwity Jamatia
- Parent(s): Brindabanhari Jamatia(Father); Rudhanpoti Jamatia(Mother)

Daniel Jamatia is an Indian politician and member of the Communist Party of India (Marxist). Jamatia served as a member of the Tripura Legislative Assembly from 2008 to 2018 from the Ampinagar constituency in South Tripura district. In 2018 Tripura Legislative Assembly election Daniel was defeated by the Indigenous Peoples Front of Tripura candidate Sindhu Chandra Jamatia.

== Political career ==
He began his political career by joining the Tribal Youth Federation. In 1994, he became a member of the Communist Party of India (Marxist) and in 1995 he was nominated as A.D.C village chairman. He currently serves as a Central Committee member of Ganamukti Parishad.

== See also ==
- Radhacharan Debbarma
- Aghore Debbarma
- Pravat Chowdhury
