= Bagma Assembly constituency =

Legislative Assembly constituency in Tripura state, India

Coordinates: 23.6°N 91.41°E

Bagma
- Constituency No. 30 for the Tripura Legislative Assembly

Constituency details
- Country: India
- Region: Northeast India
- State: Tripura
- District: Gomati
- Lok Sabha constituency: Tripura West
- Established: 1977
- Total electors: 56,768
- Reservation: ST

Member of Legislative Assembly
- 13th Tripura Legislative Assembly
- Incumbent Ram Pada Jamatia
- Party: Bharatiya Janata Party
- Elected year: 2023

Bagma is one of the 60 Legislative Assembly constituencies of Tripura state in India.

It is part of Gomati district and is reserved for candidates belonging to the Scheduled Tribes.

== Members of the Legislative Assembly ==
Election	Member	Party
1977	Rati Mohan Jamaitia	Tripura Upajati Juba Samiti
1983	Rati Mohan Jamaitia	Tripura Upajati Juba Samiti
1988	Rati Mohan Jamaitia	Tripura Upajati Juba Samiti
1993	Rati Mohan Jamaitia	Tripura Upajati Juba Samiti
1998	Rati Mohan Jamaitia	Tripura Upajati Juba Samiti
2003	Gunapada Jamatia	Communist Party of India
2008	Naresh Chandra Jamatia	Communist Party of India
2013	Naresh Chandra Jamatia	Communist Party of India
2018	Ram Pada Jamatia	Bharatiya Janata Party
2023	Ram Pada Jamatia	Bharatiya Janata Party

== Election results ==
=== 2023 Assembly election ===
2023 Tripura Legislative Assembly election: Bagma
Party	Candidate	Votes	%	±%
BJP	Ram Pada Jamatia	19,482	38.74%	▼12.11
TMP	Purna Chandra Jamatia	17,399	34.60%	New
CPI(M)	Naresh Chandra Jamatia	12,613	25.08%	New
NOTA	None of the Above	793	1.58%	▲0.63
Margin of victory		2,083	4.14%	▼1.84
Turnout		50,287	90.38%	▼3.62
Registered electors		56,768		▲10.56
BJP hold		Swing	▼12.11	

=== 2018 Assembly election ===
2018 Tripura Legislative Assembly election: Bagma
Party	Candidate	Votes	%	±%
BJP	Ram Pada Jamatia	24,074	50.85%	New
CPI(M)	Naresh Chandra Jamatia	21,241	44.87%	▼8.63
INPT	Jyotish Jamatia	695	1.47%	▼42.79
NOTA	None of the Above	450	0.95%	New
INC	Anantalal Jamatia	399	0.84%	New
Margin of victory		2,833	5.98%	▼3.25
Turnout		47,344	91.42%	▼2.63
Registered electors		51,348		▲10.36
BJP gain from CPI(M)		Swing	▼2.64	

=== 2013 Assembly election ===
2013 Tripura Legislative Assembly election: Bagma
Party	Candidate	Votes	%	±%
CPI(M)	Naresh Chandra Jamatia	23,600	53.49%	▲1.44
INPT	Jyotish Jamatia	19,525	44.25%	New
IPFT	Subodh Jamatia	995	2.26%	New
Margin of victory		4,075	9.24%	▲2.58
Turnout		44,120	95.04%	▲1.78
Registered electors		46,526		
CPI(M) hold		Swing		

=== 2008 Assembly election ===
2008 Tripura Legislative Assembly election: Bagma
Party	Candidate	Votes	%	±%
CPI(M)	Naresh Chandra Jamatia	14,979	52.05%	▲1.90
INC	Rati Mohan Jamaitia	13,064	45.39%	New
BJP	Raj Kumar Jamatia	736	2.56%	New
Margin of victory		1,915	6.65%	▲6.36
Turnout		28,779	93.21%	▲12.55
Registered electors		30,930		
CPI(M) hold		Swing		

=== 2003 Assembly election ===
2003 Tripura Legislative Assembly election: Bagma
Party	Candidate	Votes	%	±%
CPI(M)	Gunapada Jamatia	12,588	50.15%	▲3.04
INPT	Rati Mohan Jamaitia	12,513	49.85%	New
Margin of victory		75	0.30%	▼2.47
Turnout		25,101	80.52%	▼0.19
Registered electors		31,185		▲14.72
CPI(M) gain from TUS		Swing		

=== 1998 Assembly election ===
1998 Tripura Legislative Assembly election: Bagma
Party	Candidate	Votes	%	±%
TUS	Rati Mohan Jamaitia	10,940	49.88%	▲4.23
CPI(M)	Gunapada Jamatia	10,333	47.11%	New
BJP	Raj Kumar Jamatia	456	2.08%	New
Independent	Saral Pada Jamatia	203	0.93%	New
Margin of victory		607	2.77%	▼1.12
Turnout		21,932	82.97%	▼2.43
Registered electors		27,184		▲4.19
TUS hold		Swing	▲4.23	

=== 1993 Assembly election ===
1993 Tripura Legislative Assembly election: Bagma
Party	Candidate	Votes	%	±%
TUS	Rati Mohan Jamaitia	9,899	45.65%	▼10.09
Independent	Saral Pada Jamatia	9,056	41.76%	New
Independent	Kripa Sadhan Jamatia	2,729	12.59%	New
Margin of victory		843	3.89%	▼8.35
Turnout		21,684	84.33%	▼2.43
Registered electors		26,091		▲20.67
TUS hold		Swing		

=== 1988 Assembly election ===
1988 Tripura Legislative Assembly election: Bagma
Party	Candidate	Votes	%	±%
TUS	Rati Mohan Jamaitia	10,309	55.74%	▼7.18
CPI(M)	Gunapada Jamatia	8,046	43.51%	▲9.39
Margin of victory		2,263	12.24%	▼16.58
Turnout		18,494	86.86%	▲5.44
Registered electors		21,621		▲7.29
TUS hold		Swing		

=== 1983 Assembly election ===
1983 Tripura Legislative Assembly election: Bagma
Party	Candidate	Votes	%	±%
TUS	Rati Mohan Jamaitia	10,157	62.93%	▲17.67
CPI(M)	Gunapada Jamatia	5,506	34.11%	▼7.48
Independent	Pabitra Mohan Laskar	478	2.96%	New
Margin of victory		4,651	28.81%	▲25.15
Turnout		16,141	81.60%	▲2.13
Registered electors		20,151		▲25.81
TUS hold		Swing		

=== 1977 Assembly election ===
1977 Tripura Legislative Assembly election: Bagma
Party	Candidate	Votes	%	±%
TUS	Rati Mohan Jamaitia	5,652	45.26%	New
CPI(M)	Ganapada Jamatia	5,194	41.59%	New
JP	Dewan Chandra Tripura	959	7.68%	New
INC	Kamini Debbarma	450	3.60%	New
TPCC	Sashi Kumar Debbarma	233	1.87%	New
Margin of victory		458	3.67%	
Turnout		12,488	79.66%	
Registered electors		16,017		
TUS win (new seat)				

== See also ==
- List of constituencies of the Tripura Legislative Assembly
- Gomati district
