= Chawamanu Assembly constituency =

Legislative Assembly constituency in Tripura State, India

Coordinates: 23.85°N 91.99°E

Chawamanu
- Constituency No. 49 for the Tripura Legislative Assembly

Constituency details
- Country: India
- Region: Northeast India
- State: Tripura
- District: Dhalai
- Lok Sabha constituency: Tripura East
- Established: 1972
- Total electors: 44,836
- Reservation: ST

Member of Legislative Assembly
- 13th Tripura Legislative Assembly
- Incumbent Sambhu Lal Chakma
- Party: Bharatiya Janata Party
- Elected year: 2023

Chawamanu is one of the 60 Legislative Assembly constituencies of Tripura state in India.

It is part of Dhalai district and is reserved for candidates belonging to the Scheduled Tribes.

== Members of the Legislative Assembly ==
Election	Member	Party
1972	Purna Mohan Tripura	Communist Party of India
1977	Purna Mohan Tripura	Communist Party of India
1983	Purna Mohan Tripura	Communist Party of India
1988	Purna Mohan Tripura	Communist Party of India
1993	Purna Mohan Tripura	Communist Party of India
1998	Shyama Charan Tripura	Tripura Upajati Juba Samiti
2003	Shyama Charan Tripura	Indigenous Nationalist Party of Twipra
2008	Nirajoy Tripura	Communist Party of India
2013	Nirajoy Tripura	Communist Party of India
2018	Sambhu Lal Chakma	Bharatiya Janata Party
2023	Sambhu Lal Chakma	Bharatiya Janata Party

== Election results ==
=== 2023 Assembly election ===
2023 Tripura Legislative Assembly election: Chawamanu
Party	Candidate	Votes	%	±%
BJP	Sambhu Lal Chakma	16,644	41.85%	▼10.45
TMP	Hangsa Kumar Tripura	13,745	34.56%	New
CPI(M)	Jiban Mohan Tripura	7,402	18.61%	New
AITC	Rupayan Chakma	566	1.42%	New
Nationalist Citizens Party of India	Barjeda Tripura	536	1.35%	New
NOTA	None of the Above	500	1.26%	▼0.03
Independent	Tushar Kanti Chakma	379	0.95%	New
Margin of victory		2,899	7.29%	▼3.45
Turnout		39,772	88.81%	▼0.17
Registered electors		44,836		▲13.95
BJP hold		Swing	▼10.45	

=== 2018 Assembly election ===
2018 Tripura Legislative Assembly election: Chawamanu
Party	Candidate	Votes	%	±%
BJP	Sambhu Lal Chakma	18,290	52.30%	New
CPI(M)	Nirajoy Tripura	14,535	41.56%	▼9.24
INPT	Bihari Baishnab Tripura	665	1.90%	New
NOTA	None of the Above	449	1.28%	New
INC	Ashok Mitra Karbari	432	1.24%	▼44.78
Tipraland State Party	Bikash Debbarma	343	0.98%	New
Independent	Asit Debbarma	244	0.70%	New
Margin of victory		3,755	10.74%	▲5.95
Turnout		34,972	89.69%	▼0.90
Registered electors		39,348		▲13.08
BJP gain from CPI(M)		Swing	▲1.50	

=== 2013 Assembly election ===
2013 Tripura Legislative Assembly election: Chawamanu
Party	Candidate	Votes	%	±%
CPI(M)	Nirajoy Tripura	15,870	50.80%	▲2.63
INC	Zaidami Tripura	14,375	46.01%	New
SP	Amal Basu Chakma	996	3.19%	New
Margin of victory		1,495	4.79%	▲0.48
Turnout		31,241	89.96%	▲1.90
Registered electors		34,797		
CPI(M) hold		Swing		

=== 2008 Assembly election ===
2008 Tripura Legislative Assembly election: Chawamanu
Party	Candidate	Votes	%	±%
CPI(M)	Nirajoy Tripura	12,329	48.17%	▲10.00
INPT	Shyama Charan Tripura	11,228	43.86%	▼10.43
Independent	Bihari Baishnab Tripura	1,034	4.04%	New
BJP	Jagat Jyoti Chakma	586	2.29%	▼2.69
NCP	Khanna Marak	420	1.64%	▼0.91
Margin of victory		1,101	4.30%	▼11.83
Turnout		25,597	87.99%	▲21.94
Registered electors		29,128		
CPI(M) gain from INPT		Swing	▼6.13	

=== 2003 Assembly election ===
2003 Tripura Legislative Assembly election: Chawamanu
Party	Candidate	Votes	%	±%
INPT	Shyama Charan Tripura	10,352	54.30%	New
CPI(M)	Gajendra Tripura	7,277	38.17%	▼6.54
BJP	Jagatjyoti Chakma	950	4.98%	▼1.22
NCP	Kalpa Mohan Tripura	487	2.55%	New
Margin of victory		3,075	16.13%	▲11.75
Turnout		19,066	65.97%	▼1.65
Registered electors		28,915		▲11.26
INPT gain from TUS		Swing	▲5.21	

=== 1998 Assembly election ===
1998 Tripura Legislative Assembly election: Chawamanu
Party	Candidate	Votes	%	±%
TUS	Shyama Charan Tripura	8,622	49.09%	▲23.28
CPI(M)	Purna Mohan Tripura	7,853	44.71%	▼16.15
BJP	Annapurna Chakma	1,089	6.20%	New
Margin of victory		769	4.38%	▼30.68
Turnout		17,564	70.56%	▼5.29
Registered electors		25,988		▲10.39
TUS gain from CPI(M)		Swing		

=== 1993 Assembly election ===
1993 Tripura Legislative Assembly election: Chawamanu
Party	Candidate	Votes	%	±%
CPI(M)	Purna Mohan Tripura	10,442	60.87%	▲4.29
TUS	Shyama Charan Tripura	4,428	25.81%	▼17.62
Independent	Bhagya Chandra Chakma	1,313	7.65%	New
Independent	Sushaban Tripura	599	3.49%	New
AMB	Santiswar Baruan	374	2.18%	New
Margin of victory		6,014	35.05%	▲21.91
Turnout		17,156	74.65%	▼8.10
Registered electors		23,541		▲15.67
CPI(M) hold		Swing	▲4.29	

=== 1988 Assembly election ===
1988 Tripura Legislative Assembly election: Chawamanu
Party	Candidate	Votes	%	±%
CPI(M)	Purna Mohan Tripura	9,323	56.57%	▲6.33
TUS	Shyama Charan Tripura	7,157	43.43%	▼6.33
Margin of victory		2,166	13.14%	▲12.66
Turnout		16,480	82.27%	▲6.56
Registered electors		20,352		▲14.21
CPI(M) hold		Swing		

=== 1983 Assembly election ===
1983 Tripura Legislative Assembly election: Chawamanu
Party	Candidate	Votes	%	±%
CPI(M)	Purna Mohan Tripura	6,662	50.24%	▲0.34
TUS	Jadumohan Tripura	6,598	49.76%	▲32.59
Margin of victory		64	0.48%	▼32.25
Turnout		13,260	75.94%	▲7.54
Registered electors		17,820		▲28.91
CPI(M) hold		Swing		

=== 1977 Assembly election ===
1977 Tripura Legislative Assembly election: Chawamanu
Party	Candidate	Votes	%	±%
CPI(M)	Purna Mohan Tripura	4,613	49.90%	▲1.87
TUS	Shyama Charan Tripura	1,587	17.17%	New
TPCC	Bindulal Karbari	1,231	13.32%	New
INC	Jamini Mohan Karbari	998	10.80%	▼22.44
JP	Dasamani Roaja	815	8.82%	New
Margin of victory		3,026	32.73%	▲17.93
Turnout		9,244	68.48%	▲18.46
Registered electors		13,824		▲1.60
CPI(M) hold		Swing	▲1.87	

=== 1972 Assembly election ===
1972 Tripura Legislative Assembly election: Chawamanu
Party	Candidate	Votes	%	±%
CPI(M)	Purna Mohan Tripura	3,164	48.03%	New
INC	Ghanshyam Dewan	2,189	33.23%	New
Independent	Bindulal Karbari	1,234	18.73%	New
Margin of victory		975	14.80%	
Turnout		6,587	50.40%	
Registered electors		13,606		
CPI(M) win (new seat)				

== See also ==
- List of constituencies of the Tripura Legislative Assembly
- Dhalai district
