= Mandaibazar Assembly constituency =

Legislative Assembly constituency in Tripura State, India

Coordinates: 23.86°N 91.48°E

Mandaibazar
- Constituency No. 11 for the Tripura Legislative Assembly

Constituency details
- Country: India
- Region: Northeast India
- State: Tripura
- District: West Tripura
- Lok Sabha constituency: Tripura West
- Established: 1972
- Total electors: 47,642
- Reservation: ST

Member of Legislative Assembly
- 13th Tripura Legislative Assembly
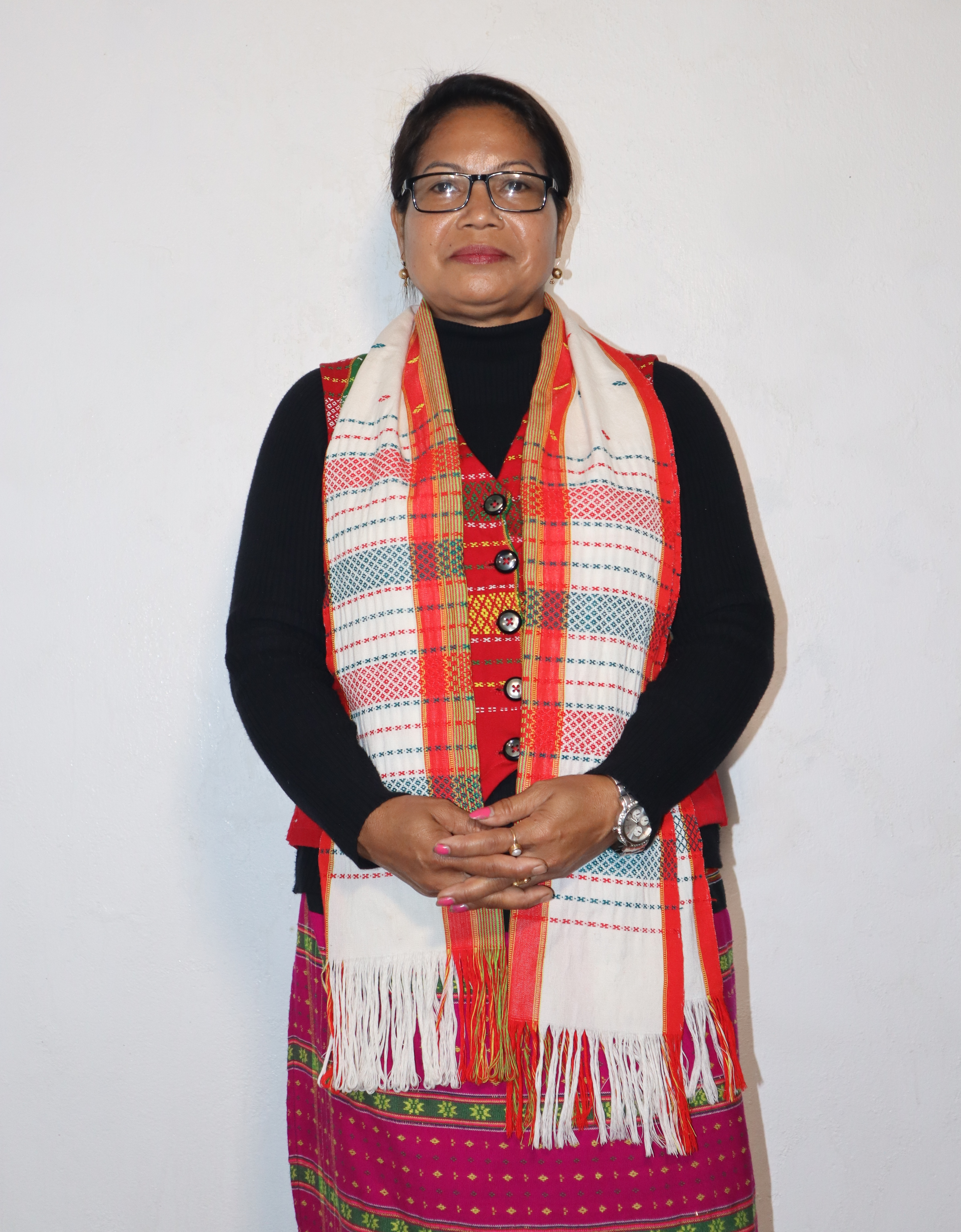
- Incumbent Swapna Debbarma
- Party: TMP
- Alliance: NDA
- Elected year: 2023

Mandaibazar is one of the 60 Legislative Assembly constituencies of Tripura state in India. It is in West Tripura district and is reserved for candidates belonging to the Scheduled Tribes. It is also part of West Tripura Lok Sabha constituency.

== Members of the Legislative Assembly ==
Election	Member	Party
1972	Kalidas Debbarma	Communist Party of India
1977	Rashiram Debbarma	Communist Party of India
1983	Rashiram Debbarma	Communist Party of India
1988	Rashiram Debbarma	Communist Party of India
1993	Rashiram Debbarma	Communist Party of India
1998	Manoranjan Debbarma	Communist Party of India
2003	Manoranjan Debbarma	Communist Party of India
2008	Manoranjan Debbarma	Communist Party of India
2013	Manoranjan Debbarma	Communist Party of India
2018	Dhirendra Debbarma	Indigenous People's Front of Tripura
2023	Swapna Debbarma	Tipra Motha Party

== Election results ==
=== 2023 Assembly election ===
2023 Tripura Legislative Assembly election: Mandaibazar
Party	Candidate	Votes	%	±%
TMP	Swapna Debbarma	28,726	66.35%	New
CPI(M)	Radhacharan Debbarma	7,077	16.35%	▼21.35
BJP	Tarit Debbarma	6,603	15.25%	New
NOTA	None of the Above	444	1.03%	▼0.07
Independent	Hiramuni Debbarma	443	1.02%	New
Margin of victory		21,649	50.01%	▲35.76
Turnout		43,293	91.17%	▼1.47
Registered electors		47,642		▲6.87
TMP gain from IPFT		Swing	▲14.41	

=== 2018 Assembly election ===
2018 Tripura Legislative Assembly election: Mandaibazar
Party	Candidate	Votes	%	±%
IPFT	Dhirendra Debbarma	21,381	51.94%	▲49.57
CPI(M)	Manoranjan Debbarma	15,517	37.70%	▼12.65
INPT	Jagadish Debbarma	2,215	5.38%	▼40.20
INC	Jiten Debbarma	496	1.20%	New
Tipraland State Party	Sona Charan Debbarma	466	1.13%	New
NOTA	None of the Above	453	1.10%	New
Margin of victory		5,864	14.25%	▲9.48
Turnout		41,162	91.13%	▼0.45
Registered electors		44,578		▲8.04
IPFT gain from CPI(M)		Swing	▲1.60	

=== 2013 Assembly election ===
2013 Tripura Legislative Assembly election: Mandaibazar
Party	Candidate	Votes	%	±%
CPI(M)	Manoranjan Debbarma	19,275	50.35%	▲0.91
INPT	Jagadish Debbarma	17,450	45.58%	▼0.98
IPFT	Basindra Debbarma	910	2.38%	New
BJP	Padma Kumar Debbarma	649	1.70%	New
Margin of victory		1,825	4.77%	▲1.89
Turnout		38,284	93.06%	▲2.13
Registered electors		41,262		
CPI(M) hold		Swing	▲0.91	

=== 2008 Assembly election ===
2008 Tripura Legislative Assembly election: Mandaibazar
Party	Candidate	Votes	%	±%
CPI(M)	Manoranjan Debbarma	16,605	49.44%	▼3.41
INPT	Jagadish Debbarma	15,638	46.56%	▼0.59
Independent	Budhu Kumar Debbarma	650	1.94%	New
LJP	Narendra Debbarma	392	1.17%	New
AITC	Satish Debbarma	301	0.90%	New
Margin of victory		967	2.88%	▼2.82
Turnout		33,586	90.67%	▲20.96
Registered electors		37,050		
CPI(M) hold		Swing	▼3.41	

=== 2003 Assembly election ===
2003 Tripura Legislative Assembly election: Mandaibazar
Party	Candidate	Votes	%	±%
CPI(M)	Manoranjan Debbarma	13,448	52.85%	▲1.19
INPT	Jagadish Debbarma	11,998	47.15%	New
Margin of victory		1,450	5.70%	▼0.62
Turnout		25,446	69.73%	▼4.54
Registered electors		36,515		▲10.85
CPI(M) hold		Swing		

=== 1998 Assembly election ===
1998 Tripura Legislative Assembly election: Mandaibazar
Party	Candidate	Votes	%	±%
CPI(M)	Manoranjan Debbarma	12,632	51.66%	▼9.86
TUS	Jagadish Debbarma	11,088	45.35%	▲12.85
BJP	Bishu Kumar Debbarma	604	2.47%	New
Independent	Tarani Rupuni	128	0.52%	New
Margin of victory		1,544	6.31%	▼22.71
Turnout		24,452	76.59%	▼0.32
Registered electors		32,942		▲6.82
CPI(M) hold		Swing	▼9.86	

=== 1993 Assembly election ===
1993 Tripura Legislative Assembly election: Mandaibazar
Party	Candidate	Votes	%	±%
CPI(M)	Rashiram Debbarma	14,142	61.52%	▲9.93
TUS	Shyama Charan Tripura	7,471	32.50%	▼14.93
Independent	Baisakh Debbarma	841	3.66%	New
Independent	Dipti Debbarma	244	1.06%	New
Independent	Ganga Manikya Debbarma	164	0.71%	New
Margin of victory		6,671	29.02%	▲24.85
Turnout		22,988	75.79%	▼3.71
Registered electors		30,838		▲15.63
CPI(M) hold		Swing	▲9.93	

=== 1988 Assembly election ===
1988 Tripura Legislative Assembly election: Mandaibazar
Party	Candidate	Votes	%	±%
CPI(M)	Rashiram Debbarma	10,768	51.59%	▼4.45
TUS	Chandrodoy Rupini	9,898	47.42%	▲4.26
Independent	Rati Rajan Das	205	0.98%	New
Margin of victory		870	4.17%	▼8.72
Turnout		20,871	79.65%	▼1.33
Registered electors		26,670		▲20.64
CPI(M) hold		Swing		

=== 1983 Assembly election ===
1983 Tripura Legislative Assembly election: Mandaibazar
Party	Candidate	Votes	%	±%
CPI(M)	Rashiram Debbarma	9,861	56.04%	▲5.32
TUS	Amiya Kumar Debbarma	7,594	43.16%	▲16.71
Independent	Sudhangshu Sen	140	0.80%	New
Margin of victory		2,267	12.88%	▼11.39
Turnout		17,595	81.00%	▲2.72
Registered electors		22,107		▲24.65
CPI(M) hold		Swing		

=== 1977 Assembly election ===
1977 Tripura Legislative Assembly election: Mandaibazar
Party	Candidate	Votes	%	±%
CPI(M)	Rashiram Debbarma	6,915	50.72%	▼15.56
TUS	Kshirode Debbarma	3,606	26.45%	▲16.11
TPCC	Bagala Debbarma	1,644	12.06%	New
INC	Ganga Manikya Debbarma	793	5.82%	▼17.56
JP	Sampra Rai Debbarma	675	4.95%	New
Margin of victory		3,309	24.27%	▼18.63
Turnout		13,633	78.24%	▲12.11
Registered electors		17,735		▲61.39
CPI(M) hold		Swing	▼15.56	

=== 1972 Assembly election ===
1972 Tripura Legislative Assembly election: Mandaibazar
Party	Candidate	Votes	%	±%
CPI(M)	Kalidas Debbarma	4,717	66.28%	New
INC	Bagala Prasad Debbarma	1,664	23.38%	New
TUS	Kshirod Debbarma	736	10.34%	New
Margin of victory		3,053	42.90%	
Turnout		7,117	65.98%	
Registered electors		10,989		
CPI(M) win (new seat)				

== See also ==
- List of constituencies of the Tripura Legislative Assembly
- West Tripura district
- Mandaibazar
- Tripura West (Lok Sabha constituency)
