= Ampinagar Assembly constituency =

Legislative Assembly constituency in Tripura state, India

Coordinates: 23.66°N 91.62°E

Ampinagar
- Constituency No. 41 for the Tripura Legislative Assembly

Constituency details
- Country: India
- Region: Northeast India
- State: Tripura
- District: Gomati
- Lok Sabha constituency: Tripura East
- Established: 1972
- Total electors: 42,135
- Reservation: ST

Member of Legislative Assembly
- 13th Tripura Legislative Assembly
- Incumbent Pathan Lal Jamatia
- Party: TMP
- Alliance: NDA
- Elected year: 2023

Ampinagar is one of the 60 Legislative Assembly constituencies of Tripura state in India.

It is part of Gomati district and is reserved for candidates belonging to the Scheduled Tribes.

== Members of the Legislative Assembly ==
Election	Member	Party
1972	Bullu Kuki	Communist Party of India
1977	Nagendra Jamatia	Tripura Upajati Juba Samiti
1983	Nagendra Jamatia	Tripura Upajati Juba Samiti
1988	Nagendra Jamatia	Tripura Upajati Juba Samiti
1993	Debabrata Koloy	Independent politician
1998	Nagendra Jamatia	Tripura Upajati Juba Samiti
2003	Nagendra Jamatia	Indigenous Nationalist Party of Twipra
2008	Daniel Jamatia	Communist Party of India
2013	Daniel Jamatia	Communist Party of India
2018	Sindhu Chandra Jamatia	Indigenous People's Front of Tripura
2023	Pathan Lal Jamatia	Tipra Motha Party

== Election results ==
=== 2023 Assembly election ===
2023 Tripura Legislative Assembly election: Ampinagar
Party	Candidate	Votes	%	±%
TMP	Pathan Lal Jamatia	21,525	57.03%	New
BJP	Patal Kanya Jamatia	9,339	24.74%	New
CPI(M)	Parikhit Kalai	4,151	11.00%	New
IPFT	Sindhu Chandra Jamatia	2,068	5.48%	▼47.99
NOTA	None of the Above	341	0.90%	▼1.01
Independent	Pabitra Mohan Jamatia	319	0.85%	New
Margin of victory		12,186	32.29%	▲17.75
Turnout		37,743	89.60%	▼0.94
Registered electors		42,135		▲12.04
TMP gain from IPFT		Swing	▲3.56	

=== 2018 Assembly election ===
2018 Tripura Legislative Assembly election: Ampinagar
Party	Candidate	Votes	%	±%
IPFT	Sindhu Chandra Jamatia	18,202	53.47%	▲52.04
CPI(M)	Daniel Jamatia	13,255	38.94%	▼13.75
INPT	Ram Krishna Jamatia	1,303	3.83%	▼39.53
INC	Daniel Kaipeng	672	1.97%	New
NOTA	None of the Above	651	1.91%	New
Margin of victory		4,947	14.53%	▲5.20
Turnout		34,041	90.69%	▲0.13
Registered electors		37,608		▲13.97
IPFT gain from CPI(M)		Swing	▲0.78	

=== 2013 Assembly election ===
2013 Tripura Legislative Assembly election: Ampinagar
Party	Candidate	Votes	%	±%
CPI(M)	Daniel Jamatia	15,714	52.69%	▼0.57
INPT	Nagendra Jamatia	12,930	43.36%	▲1.08
IPFT	Patal Kanya Jamatia	426	1.43%	New
BJP	Subir Kumar Jamatia	420	1.41%	New
Independent	Manaram Reang	333	1.12%	New
Margin of victory		2,784	9.34%	▼1.64
Turnout		29,823	93.06%	▼0.81
Registered electors		32,997		
CPI(M) hold		Swing	▼0.57	

=== 2008 Assembly election ===
2008 Tripura Legislative Assembly election: Ampinagar
Party	Candidate	Votes	%	±%
CPI(M)	Daniel Jamatia	14,284	53.26%	▲4.29
INPT	Nagendra Jamatia	11,340	42.28%	▼8.75
Independent	Sindhu Chandra Jamatia	462	1.72%	New
AITC	Nagendra Kalai	269	1.00%	New
Independent	Krishna Joy Reang	241	0.90%	New
LJP	Silendra Reang	225	0.84%	New
Margin of victory		2,944	10.98%	▲8.91
Turnout		26,821	91.28%	▲15.25
Registered electors		29,412		
CPI(M) gain from INPT		Swing	▲2.22	

=== 2003 Assembly election ===
2003 Tripura Legislative Assembly election: Ampinagar
Party	Candidate	Votes	%	±%
INPT	Nagendra Jamatia	11,439	51.04%	New
CPI(M)	Nakshatra Jamatia	10,975	48.96%	▲3.38
Margin of victory		464	2.07%	▼4.43
Turnout		22,414	76.05%	▲0.28
Registered electors		29,516		▲5.23
INPT gain from TUS		Swing		

=== 1998 Assembly election ===
1998 Tripura Legislative Assembly election: Ampinagar
Party	Candidate	Votes	%	±%
TUS	Nagendra Jamatia	11,054	52.09%	▲10.14
CPI(M)	Upaharan Jamatia	9,674	45.58%	New
BJP	Khagendra Kalai	495	2.33%	New
Margin of victory		1,380	6.50%	▼4.74
Turnout		21,223	78.02%	▼3.03
Registered electors		28,050		▲2.19
TUS gain from Independent		Swing		

=== 1993 Assembly election ===
1993 Tripura Legislative Assembly election: Ampinagar
Party	Candidate	Votes	%	±%
Independent	Debabrata Koloy	11,488	53.19%	New
TUS	Nagendra Jamatia	9,060	41.95%	▼12.66
Independent	Ganesh Kalai Singh	633	2.93%	New
AMB	Minati Roy	337	1.56%	New
Margin of victory		2,428	11.24%	▲0.75
Turnout		21,598	79.67%	▼3.67
Registered electors		27,448		▲13.44
Independent gain from TUS		Swing	▼1.42	

=== 1988 Assembly election ===
1988 Tripura Legislative Assembly election: Ampinagar
Party	Candidate	Votes	%	±%
TUS	Nagendra Jamatia	10,882	54.61%	▼4.37
Independent	Debabrata Koloy	8,792	44.12%	New
Independent	Pabitra Mohan Laskar	252	1.26%	New
Margin of victory		2,090	10.49%	▼17.65
Turnout		19,926	83.16%	▲8.38
Registered electors		24,195		▲11.74
TUS hold		Swing		

=== 1983 Assembly election ===
1983 Tripura Legislative Assembly election: Ampinagar
Party	Candidate	Votes	%	±%
TUS	Nagendra Jamatia	9,449	58.99%	▲13.81
CPI(M)	Madhu Sudan Kalai	4,941	30.84%	▼7.02
Independent	Pabitra Mohan Laskar	1,629	10.17%	New
Margin of victory		4,508	28.14%	▲20.83
Turnout		16,019	75.29%	▲2.13
Registered electors		21,653		▲22.36
TUS hold		Swing		

=== 1977 Assembly election ===
1977 Tripura Legislative Assembly election: Ampinagar
Party	Candidate	Votes	%	±%
TUS	Nagendra Jamatia	5,744	45.17%	▲36.81
CPI(M)	Madhu Sudan Kalai	4,814	37.86%	▼19.98
INC	Sravan Kalai	1,583	12.45%	New
TPCC	Manindra Debbarman	423	3.33%	New
JP	Tabil Kalai	151	1.19%	New
Margin of victory		930	7.31%	▼16.73
Turnout		12,715	73.60%	▲14.15
Registered electors		17,696		▲61.24
TUS gain from CPI(M)		Swing	▼12.66	

=== 1972 Assembly election ===
1972 Tripura Legislative Assembly election: Ampinagar
Party	Candidate	Votes	%	±%
CPI(M)	Bullu Kuki	3,663	57.84%	New
Independent	Gopinath Jamatia	2,140	33.79%	New
TUS	Sachindra Kumar Jamatia	530	8.37%	New
Margin of victory		1,523	24.05%	
Turnout		6,333	59.63%	
Registered electors		10,975		
CPI(M) win (new seat)				

== See also ==
- List of constituencies of the Tripura Legislative Assembly
- Gomati district
