= Dhirendra Debbarma =

Indian politician

Member of the Tripura Legislative Assembly
- In office 2018–2023
- Preceded by: Manoranjan Debbarma
- Succeeded by: Swapna Debbarma
- Constituency: Mandaibazar

Personal details
- Born: 25 April 1954 (age 72) Rashiram Sipai Para Jirania, West Tripura, Tripura
- Party: Indigenous People's Front of Tripura

Dhirendra Debbarma (born 25 April 1954) is an Tripuri Indian politician and a member of the Indigenous People's Front of Tripura. He was elected in the 2018 Tripura Legislative Assembly election from Mandaibazar in the West Tripura district. He is a former member of the Tripura Legislative Assembly.
