= Takarjala Assembly constituency =

Legislative Assembly constituency in Tripura State, India

Coordinates: 23.71°N 91.41°E

Takarjala
- Constituency No. 12 for the Tripura Legislative Assembly

Constituency details
- Country: India
- Region: Northeast India
- State: Tripura
- District: Sipahijala
- Lok Sabha constituency: Tripura West
- Established: 1967
- Total electors: 44,510
- Reservation: ST

Member of Legislative Assembly
- 13th Tripura Legislative Assembly
- Incumbent Biswajit Kalai
- Party: TMP
- Alliance: NDA
- Elected year: 2023

Takarjala is one of the 60 Legislative Assembly constituencies of Tripura state in India. It is in Sipahijala district and is reserved for candidates belonging to the Scheduled Tribes. It is also part of West Tripura Lok Sabha constituency.

== Members of the Legislative Assembly ==
Election	Member	Party
1967	M. D. Barma	Indian National Congress
1972	Gunapada Jamatia	Communist Party of India
1977	Sudhanwa Debbarma	Communist Party of India
1983	Sudhanwa Debbarma	Communist Party of India
1988	Tarani Debbarma	Communist Party of India
1993	Kartik Kanya Debbarma	Communist Party of India
1998	Baijayanti Kalai	Communist Party of India
2003	Rajeshwar Debbarma	Indigenous Nationalist Party of Twipra
2008	Niranjan Debbarma	Communist Party of India
2013	Niranjan Debbarma	Communist Party of India
2018	Narendra Chandra Debbarma	Indigenous People's Front of Tripura
2023	Biswajit Kalai	Tipra Motha Party

== Election results ==
=== 2023 Assembly election ===
2023 Tripura Legislative Assembly election: Takarjala
Party	Candidate	Votes	%	±%
TMP	Biswajit Kalai	34,717	86.81%	New
IPFT	Bidhan Debbarma	2,262	5.66%	▼56.24
CPI(M)	Shyamal Debbarma	1,796	4.49%	▼21.90
NOTA	None of the Above	676	1.69%	▼0.43
RPI(A)	Ananta Debbarma	542	1.36%	New
Margin of victory		32,455	81.15%	▲45.65
Turnout		39,993	89.96%	▲1.54
Registered electors		44,510		▲10.31
TMP gain from IPFT		Swing	▲24.91	

=== 2018 Assembly election ===
2018 Tripura Legislative Assembly election: Takarjala
Party	Candidate	Votes	%	±%
IPFT	Narendra Chandra Debbarma	22,056	61.90%	▲59.91
CPI(M)	Ramendra Debbarma	9,404	26.39%	▼23.48
INPT	Amiya Kumar Debbarma	2,002	5.62%	▼40.78
INC	Samson Debbarma	786	2.21%	New
NOTA	None of the Above	755	2.12%	New
Tipraland State Party	Chitta Ranjan Debbarma	566	1.59%	New
Margin of victory		12,652	35.51%	▲32.03
Turnout		35,633	88.23%	▼3.50
Registered electors		40,350		▲6.70
IPFT gain from CPI(M)		Swing	▲12.02	

=== 2013 Assembly election ===
2013 Tripura Legislative Assembly election: Takarjala
Party	Candidate	Votes	%	±%
CPI(M)	Niranjan Debbarma	17,315	49.87%	▼1.02
INPT	Rajeshwar Debbarma	16,108	46.40%	▲1.47
IPFT	Brajalal Debbarma	690	1.99%	New
BJP	Ganesh Kalai	605	1.74%	New
Margin of victory		1,207	3.48%	▼2.49
Turnout		34,718	91.91%	▲1.05
Registered electors		37,816		
CPI(M) hold		Swing	▼1.02	

=== 2008 Assembly election ===
2008 Tripura Legislative Assembly election: Takarjala
Party	Candidate	Votes	%	±%
CPI(M)	Niranjan Debbarma	12,470	50.90%	▲32.04
INPT	Rajeshwar Debbarma	11,008	44.93%	▼32.82
Independent	Sukumar Debbarma	419	1.71%	New
AITC	Sanjit Debbarma	255	1.04%	New
Independent	Biswamani Debbarma	194	0.79%	New
LJP	Subiram Debbarma	154	0.63%	New
Margin of victory		1,462	5.97%	▼52.92
Turnout		24,500	90.79%	▲28.65
Registered electors		26,994		
CPI(M) gain from INPT		Swing	▼26.85	

=== 2003 Assembly election ===
2003 Tripura Legislative Assembly election: Takarjala
Party	Candidate	Votes	%	±%
INPT	Rajeshwar Debbarma	12,784	77.75%	New
CPI(M)	Baijayanti Kalai	3,101	18.86%	▼29.55
NCP	Kartik Kanya Debbarma	557	3.39%	New
Margin of victory		9,683	58.89%	▲58.86
Turnout		16,442	62.11%	▼11.81
Registered electors		26,472		▲0.56
INPT gain from CPI(M)		Swing		

=== 1998 Assembly election ===
1998 Tripura Legislative Assembly election: Takarjala
Party	Candidate	Votes	%	±%
CPI(M)	Baijayanti Kalai	9,420	48.41%	▼3.01
TUS	Rahindra Debbarma	9,414	48.38%	▲21.12
Independent	Sudhir Chandra Debbarma	329	1.69%	New
BJP	Surya Kumar Debbarma	297	1.53%	New
Margin of victory		6	0.03%	▼24.14
Turnout		19,460	76.03%	▼4.34
Registered electors		26,325		▼1.76
CPI(M) hold		Swing	▼3.01	

=== 1993 Assembly election ===
1993 Tripura Legislative Assembly election: Takarjala
Party	Candidate	Votes	%	±%
CPI(M)	Kartik Kanya Debbarma	10,783	51.42%	▼1.38
TUS	Sukhendu Debbarma	5,715	27.25%	▼18.84
Independent	Bijoy Kumar Hranghal	4,183	19.95%	New
Independent	Surjya Kumar Debbarma	164	0.78%	New
Margin of victory		5,068	24.17%	▲17.45
Turnout		20,970	79.44%	▼5.52
Registered electors		26,796		▲21.97
CPI(M) hold		Swing	▼1.38	

=== 1988 Assembly election ===
1988 Tripura Legislative Assembly election: Takarjala
Party	Candidate	Votes	%	±%
CPI(M)	Tarani Debbarma	9,719	52.80%	▼7.02
TUS	Surya Kumar Debbarma	8,483	46.09%	▲6.80
JP	Bishu Kumar Debbarma	166	0.90%	New
Margin of victory		1,236	6.72%	▼13.82
Turnout		18,406	85.14%	▲6.01
Registered electors		21,970		▲13.21
CPI(M) hold		Swing		

=== 1983 Assembly election ===
1983 Tripura Legislative Assembly election: Takarjala
Party	Candidate	Votes	%	±%
CPI(M)	Sudhanwa Debbarma	9,029	59.83%	▲18.33
TUS	Suriya Kumar Debbarma	5,930	39.29%	▲7.73
Independent	Promode Behari Majumder	133	0.88%	New
Margin of victory		3,099	20.53%	▲10.60
Turnout		15,092	79.35%	▲3.18
Registered electors		19,406		▲12.12
CPI(M) hold		Swing		

=== 1977 Assembly election ===
1977 Tripura Legislative Assembly election: Takarjala
Party	Candidate	Votes	%	±%
CPI(M)	Sudhanwa Debbarma	5,358	41.50%	▲0.12
TUS	Biswa Kumar Debbarma	4,075	31.56%	New
INC	Mano Mohan Debbarma	2,051	15.89%	▼20.56
TPCC	Kumar Debbarma	1,006	7.79%	New
JP	Rabindra Kishore Debbarma	369	2.86%	New
Margin of victory		1,283	9.94%	▲5.01
Turnout		12,911	76.36%	▲11.17
Registered electors		17,309		▲31.23
CPI(M) hold		Swing	▲0.12	

=== 1972 Assembly election ===
1972 Tripura Legislative Assembly election: Takarjala
Party	Candidate	Votes	%	±%
CPI(M)	Gunapada Jamatia	3,461	41.37%	New
INC	Mahendra Debbarma	3,049	36.45%	▼18.39
Independent	Siddi Kumar Jamatia	934	11.17%	New
Independent	Nagendra Chandra Jamatia	921	11.01%	New
Margin of victory		412	4.93%	▼4.75
Turnout		8,365	65.21%	▼1.94
Registered electors		13,190		▼31.93
CPI(M) gain from INC		Swing	▼13.46	

=== 1967 Assembly election ===
1967 Tripura Legislative Assembly election: Takarjala
Party	Candidate	Votes	%	±%
INC	M. D. Barma	6,945	54.84%	New
Independent	B. D. Barma	5,720	45.16%	New
Margin of victory		1,225	9.67%	
Turnout		12,665	67.79%	
Registered electors		19,377		
INC win (new seat)				

== See also ==
- List of constituencies of the Tripura Legislative Assembly
- West Tripura district
- Takarjala
- Tripura West (Lok Sabha constituency)
