= Swapna Debbarma =

Indian politician

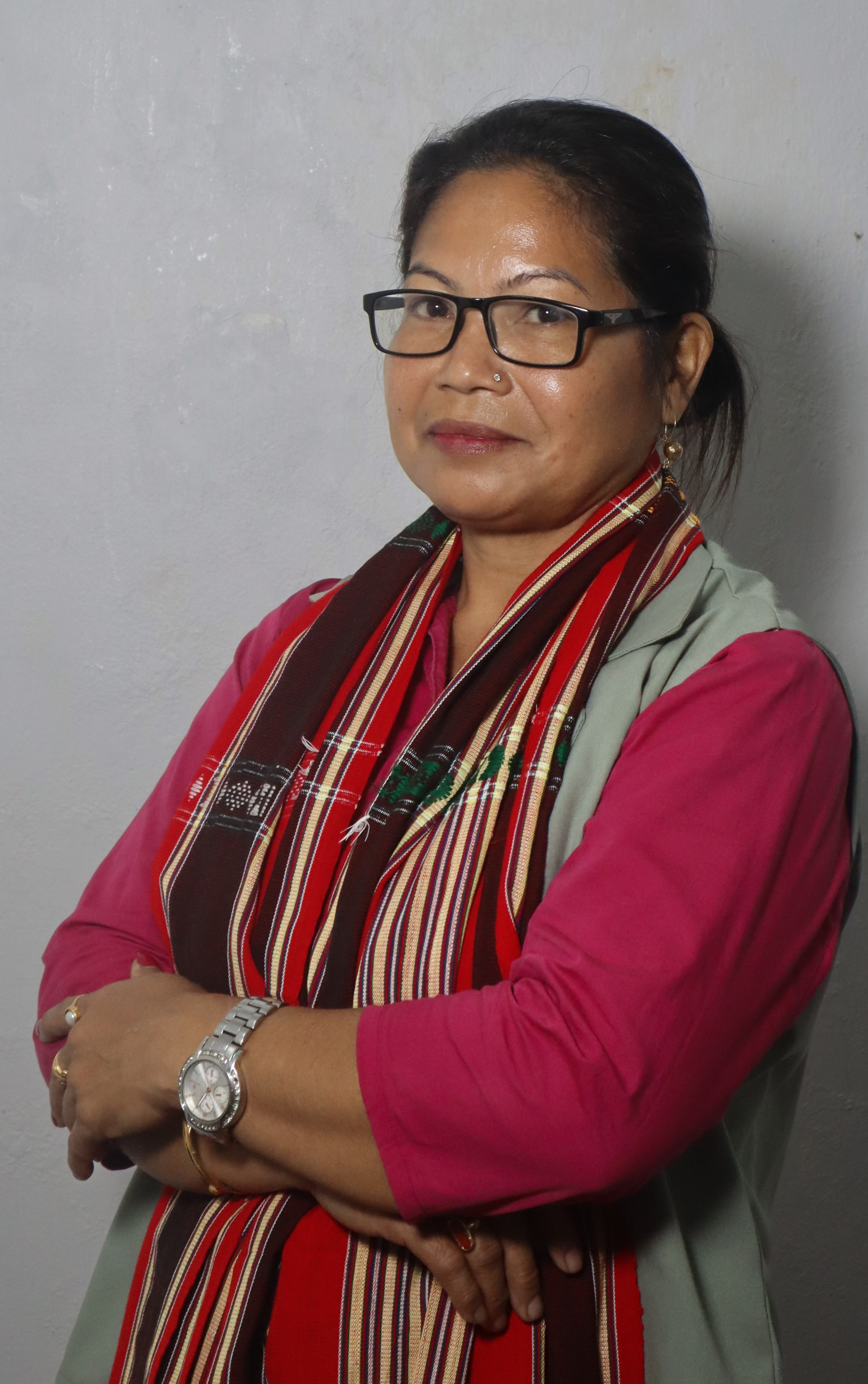
- Official Portrait, 2023

Member of the Tripura Legislative Assembly
- Incumbent
- Assumed office 2023
- Preceded by: Dhirendra Debbarma
- Constituency: Mandaibazar

Personal details
- Born: 1975 (age 50–51)
- Party: Tipra Motha Party
- Spouse: Mintu Debbarma
- Children: 1
- Occupation: Politician
- Profession: Social Worker
- Committees: Chairman, Library Committee, Tripura Legislative Assembly (1 April 2025–present); Member, Committee On Government Assurances, Tripura Legislative Assembly (1 April 2025–present)

Swapna Debbarma is an Indian politician from Tripura. She won the 2023 Tripura Legislative Assembly election as a candidate of the Tipra Motha Party representing the Mandaibazar Assembly constituency and became a member of the 13th Tripura Assembly.

== Political career ==
Swapna Debbarma joined TIPRA Motha and became a part of its women's wing TIPRA Women Federation (TWF). She contested the 2023 Tripura Assembly Election from Mandaibaazar, defeating Dhirendra Debbarma.
