= Prasanta Debbarma =

Indian politician

Member of Tripura Legislative Assembly
- In office 2018–2023
- Preceded by: Padma Kumar Debbarma
- Succeeded by: Ranjit Debbarma
- Constituency: Ramchandraghat

Personal details
- Born: 13 January 1976 (age 50) Manai Charra
- Party: Indigenous People's Front of Tripura

Prasanta Debbarma (born 13 January 1976) is an Indian politician from Tripura. He is a former Member of Legislative Assembly (MLA) representing Ramchandraghat (Vidhan Sabha constituency) in the Khowai district and east region of Tripura. He is affiliated with the Indigenous People's Front of Tripura (IPFT).

== Early life and political career ==
Debbarma was born on 13 January 1976 to Nilmohan Deb Barma and Manjuri Deb Barma. An HS holder, he contested the 2018 Legislative Assembly election against CPI (M) candidate Padma Kumar Debbarma and secured 56.22% of the votes polled, winning by 19,439 votes.
