= Krishnapur Assembly constituency =

Legislative Assembly constituency in Tripura State, India

Coordinates: 23.87°N 91.64°E

Krishnapur
- Constituency No. 29 for the Tripura Legislative Assembly

Constituency details
- Country: India
- Region: Northeast India
- State: Tripura
- District: Khowai
- Lok Sabha constituency: Tripura East
- Established: 1977
- Total electors: 37,929
- Reservation: ST

Member of Legislative Assembly
- 13th Tripura Legislative Assembly
- Incumbent Bikash Debbarma
- Party: Bharatiya Janata Party
- Elected year: 2023

Krishnapur is one of the 60 Legislative Assembly constituencies of Tripura state in India. It is in Khowai district and is reserved for candidates belonging to the Scheduled Tribes. It is also part of East Tripura Lok Sabha constituency.

== Members of the Legislative Assembly ==
Election	Member	Party
1977	Manindra Debbarma	Communist Party of India
1983	Kali Kumar Debbarma	Communist Party of India
1988	Khagendra Jamatia	Communist Party of India
1993	Khagendra Jamatia	Communist Party of India
1998	Khagendra Jamatia	Communist Party of India
2003	Khagendra Jamatia	Communist Party of India
2008	Khagendra Jamatia	Communist Party of India
2013	Khagendra Jamatia	Communist Party of India
2018	Atul Debbarma	Bharatiya Janata Party
2023	Bikash Debbarma	Bharatiya Janata Party

== Election results ==
=== 2023 Assembly election ===
2023 Tripura Legislative Assembly election: Krishnapur
Party	Candidate	Votes	%	±%
BJP	Bikash Debbarma	13,800	39.97%	▼11.24
TMP	Mahendra Debbarma	11,162	32.33%	New
CPI(M)	Swasti Debbarma	8,679	25.14%	▼19.97
NOTA	None of the Above	471	1.36%	▲0.37
Independent	Atul Debbarma	413	1.20%	New
Margin of victory		2,638	7.64%	▲1.53
Turnout		34,525	91.10%	▼1.36
Registered electors		37,929		▲7.27
BJP hold		Swing	▼11.24	

=== 2018 Assembly election ===
2018 Tripura Legislative Assembly election: Krishnapur
Party	Candidate	Votes	%	±%
BJP	Atul Debbarma	16,730	51.21%	▲49.34
CPI(M)	Khagendra Jamatia	14,735	45.11%	▼13.22
INC	Saratal Jamatia	397	1.22%	▼36.53
NOTA	None of the Above	325	0.99%	New
Independent	Kripajay Reang	211	0.65%	New
Margin of victory		1,995	6.11%	▼14.47
Turnout		32,668	91.80%	▼1.27
Registered electors		35,359		▲12.79
BJP gain from CPI(M)		Swing	▼7.11	

=== 2013 Assembly election ===
2013 Tripura Legislative Assembly election: Krishnapur
Party	Candidate	Votes	%	±%
CPI(M)	Khagendra Jamatia	17,125	58.32%	▲6.75
INC	Sabda Kumar Jamatia	11,083	37.74%	▼6.79
IPFT	Sunadhan Debbarma	606	2.06%	New
BJP	Mania Debbarma	549	1.87%	▼2.02
Margin of victory		6,042	20.58%	▲13.54
Turnout		29,363	93.75%	▲3.41
Registered electors		31,350		
CPI(M) hold		Swing	▲6.75	

=== 2008 Assembly election ===
2008 Tripura Legislative Assembly election: Krishnapur
Party	Candidate	Votes	%	±%
CPI(M)	Khagendra Jamatia	13,325	51.57%	▲1.48
INC	Sabda Kumar Jamatia	11,508	44.54%	New
BJP	Mania Debbarma	1,006	3.89%	▲0.62
Margin of victory		1,817	7.03%	▲1.80
Turnout		25,839	90.36%	▲20.27
Registered electors		28,631		
CPI(M) hold		Swing		

=== 2003 Assembly election ===
2003 Tripura Legislative Assembly election: Krishnapur
Party	Candidate	Votes	%	±%
CPI(M)	Khagendra Jamatia	9,922	50.09%	▼4.29
INPT	Sabda Kumar Jamatia	8,885	44.86%	New
BJP	Jagat Debbarma	649	3.28%	▼4.29
NCP	Pandiram Reang	352	1.78%	New
Margin of victory		1,037	5.24%	▼12.78
Turnout		19,808	69.98%	▼0.14
Registered electors		28,305		▲9.91
CPI(M) hold		Swing	▼4.29	

=== 1998 Assembly election ===
1998 Tripura Legislative Assembly election: Krishnapur
Party	Candidate	Votes	%	±%
CPI(M)	Khagendra Jamatia	9,821	54.39%	▼15.99
TUS	Khagendra Kumar Reang	6,568	36.37%	▲10.70
BJP	Jagat Debbarma	1,367	7.57%	New
AMB	Rabini Debnath (Debbarma)	133	0.74%	▼2.84
Independent	Namajoy Reang	123	0.68%	New
Margin of victory		3,253	18.01%	▼26.70
Turnout		18,058	72.27%	▼7.13
Registered electors		25,753		▲1.10
CPI(M) hold		Swing	▼15.99	

=== 1993 Assembly election ===
1993 Tripura Legislative Assembly election: Krishnapur
Party	Candidate	Votes	%	±%
CPI(M)	Khagendra Jamatia	13,850	70.38%	▲12.60
TUS	Karna Singh Jamatia	5,051	25.67%	▼14.89
AMB	Chandramani Debbarma	704	3.58%	New
Margin of victory		8,799	44.71%	▲27.49
Turnout		19,679	78.12%	▼3.50
Registered electors		25,474		▲20.53
CPI(M) hold		Swing		

=== 1988 Assembly election ===
1988 Tripura Legislative Assembly election: Krishnapur
Party	Candidate	Votes	%	±%
CPI(M)	Khagendra Jamatia	9,861	57.78%	▲3.49
TUS	Karna Singh Jamatia	6,922	40.56%	New
Independent	Sishu Ranjan Roy	283	1.66%	New
Margin of victory		2,939	17.22%	▲0.73
Turnout		17,066	81.76%	▲10.19
Registered electors		21,135		▲11.41
CPI(M) hold		Swing		

=== 1983 Assembly election ===
1983 Tripura Legislative Assembly election: Krishnapur
Party	Candidate	Votes	%	±%
CPI(M)	Kali Kumar Debbarma	7,267	54.29%	▼3.01
INC	Maharaja Kumar Sahadeb Bikaram Kishore Debbarma	5,059	37.80%	▲21.84
Independent	Sudhangshu Sen	1,059	7.91%	New
Margin of victory		2,208	16.50%	▼24.85
Turnout		13,385	71.86%	▲4.81
Registered electors		18,970		▲16.85
CPI(M) hold		Swing		

=== 1977 Assembly election ===
1977 Tripura Legislative Assembly election: Krishnapur
Party	Candidate	Votes	%	±%
CPI(M)	Manindra Debbarma	6,116	57.30%	New
INC	Maharajkumar Nakshatra Bikram	1,703	15.95%	New
JP	Ananta Hari Jamatia	1,062	9.95%	New
TPCC	Bhrighumani Jamatia	964	9.03%	New
TUS	Karna Singh Jamatia	682	6.39%	New
Independent	Bilaiham Reang	147	1.38%	New
Margin of victory		4,413	41.34%	
Turnout		10,674	67.32%	
Registered electors		16,234		
CPI(M) win (new seat)				

== See also ==
- List of constituencies of the Tripura Legislative Assembly
- Khowai district
- Tripura East (Lok Sabha constituency)
