= Islam Uddin =

Indian politician

Member of the Tripura Legislative Assembly
- Incumbent
- Assumed office 2023
- In office 2018–2023
- Preceded by: Fayzur Rahaman
- Constituency: Kadamtala–Kurti

Personal details
- Party: Communist Party of India (Marxist)

Islam Uddin is an Indian politician belonging to the Communist Party of India (Marxist) (CPI (M)). He is a Member of the Legislative Assembly (MLA) representing the Kadamtala-Kurti Assembly constituency in the North Tripura district and East region of Tripura.

== Early life and political career ==
Islam Uddin contested the 2018 Tripura Legislative Assembly election on a CPI (M) ticket from North Tripura and garnered 20,721 (57.73%) of the votes. He was elected over Giyas Uddin Choudhary of the Nationalist Congress Party and Tinku Roy of the Bharatiya Janata Party, who got 936 and 13,839 votes respectively out of the total votes polled.

== Electoral performance ==
Election	Constituency	Party	Result	Votes %	Opposition Candidate	Opposition Party	Opposition vote %	Ref
2023	Kadamtala–Kurti	CPI(M)	Won	49.65%	Dilip Tanti	BJP	44.95%	
2018	Kadamtala–Kurti	CPI(M)	Won	56.84%	Tinku Roy	BJP	37.96%	
