= Biswajit Kalai =

Indian politician from Tripura

Member of the Tripura Legislative Assembly
- Incumbent
- Assumed office 2023
- Preceded by: Narendra Chandra Debbarma
- Constituency: Takarjala

Personal details
- Born: 1 January 1982 (age 44)
- Party: Tipra Motha Party

Biswajit Kalai is a Tipra Indian politician from Tripura. He was elected in the 2023 Tripura Legislative Assembly election as a candidate of the Tipra Motha Party from the Takarjala Assembly constituency by a record margin of 32,455 votes.

== Political career ==
Kalai started his political career as a leader of the Twipra Students' Federation.
