= Sambhu Lal Chakma =

Indian politician

Sambhu Lal Chakma 𑄥𑄧𑄟𑄴𑄞𑄪 𑄣𑄳𑄃𑄣𑄴 𑄌𑄋𑄴𑄟𑄳𑄦

Member of the Tripura Legislative Assembly
- Incumbent
- Assumed office 09 March 2018
- Preceded by: Nirajoy Tripura
- Constituency: Chawamanu

Personal details
- Born: Sambhu Lal Chakma; 20 April 1989 (age 36) Manikpur, Tripura, India
- Party: Bharatiya Janata Party
- Spouse: Sanjita Chakma

Sambhu Lal Chakma is an Indian singer and politician who represents Chawamanu in the Tripura Legislative Assembly. He is among the many candidates of the BJP to win a seat for the party in the 2018 state elections.
