= Budha Debbarma =

Indian politician

Member of the Tripura Legislative Assembly
- In office 09 March 1983 – 1988
- Preceded by: Niranjan Debbarma
- Succeeded by: Niranjan Debbarma
- Constituency: Golaghati

Personal details
- Born: Tripura, India
- Party: Tripura Upajati Juba Samiti

Budha Debbarma was a politician and indigenous leader from Tripura, India. He was a member of the Tripura Legislative Assembly, being elected in the 1983 and 1988 elections from the Golaghati Assembly constituency. He was one of the leaders who helped build the Tripura Upajati Juba Samiti.
