= Atul Debbarma =

Indian politician (born 1965)

Member of Tripura Legislative Assembly
- In office 2018–2023
- Preceded by: Khagendra Jamatia
- Succeeded by: Bikash Debbarma
- Constituency: Krishnapur

Personal details
- Born: 8 January 1965 (age 61)
- Party: BJP
- Spouse: Madhabi Debbarma
- Education: Delhi University; Nagpur University; Indian Institute of Public Administration; Chulalongkorn University; Lal Bahadur Shastri National Academy of Administration
- Profession: Politician, Doctor, Writer

Atul Debbarma (born 8 January 1965) is an Indian doctor-turned-politician and author. He was a practicing doctor for the Municipal Corporation of Delhi until December 2017. He became involved with the Rashtriya Swayamsevak Sangh (RSS) and its different wings such as the Vanvasi Kalyan Ashram and the Vivekananda International Foundation in 2007. He won the 2018 Tripura Assembly Elections as the BJP candidate from the Krishnapur constituency.

== Early life ==
Atul Debbarma was born in Teliamura, Tripura to Ishwar Chandra Debbarma and Bidya Laxmi Debbarma. He graduated from High School and Higher Secondary School from Tripura Board of Secondary Education in first division. He completed his MBBS degree and earned a Diploma in Child Health from Nagpur University. He holds an LL. B degree from Delhi University.

== Career ==
He worked as a Medical Officer in a Mobile Health Team for the Tripura ADC government from 1991-1992 during which he toured throughout the state. He joined the Municipal Corporation of Delhi as a Medical Officer in December 1992 through CMSE conducted by the UPSC. He voluntarily retired from his post of Chief Medical Officer, Senior Administrative Grade in December 2017.

During his 25 years of service, he underwent many trainings from institutions including the LBS National Academy of Administration (Mussoorie), Chulalongkorn University in Thailand (WHO Fellowship Program), Indian Institute of Public Administration (New Delhi), Central Health Education Bureau (New Delhi), and the National Institute of Health and Family Welfare (New Delhi).

== Activism ==
Debbarma associated himself with nationalist ideology in 1992 and became affiliated with the BJP. He became an active RSS member and has been associated with its different wings since 2007.

He founded many organizations aiming to promote the cultural and social awakening of the Tripuri people:

- Delhi Tripura Society, New Delhi – a social platform of Tripuri people residing in Delhi and the NCR region.
- Tripur Kshatriya Samaj, Agartala – a socio-cultural platform of the Tripuri community to safeguard, promote and practice the community’s social values, rituals, tradition, culture and heritage.
- Panch Tripur Sangh, Agartala – a socio-cultural umbrella organization comprising representatives of various Tripuran tribal communities, such as the Jamatia, Noatia, Kaipeng, Molsom.
- Tripur Sanatan Hindu Sangh, Agartala - a religious organization comprising saints, sadhus, gurus and heads of ashrams and temples.
- Subrai Mission Trust, Agartala – a charitable organization to serve under-privileged people via health, education and philanthropic activities.
- Subrai Vidya Mandir, Agartala – an English Medium School with hostel facilities for tribal boys and girls established near Agartala, where modern education is imparted along with Indian values. The school educates students up till 8th standard. Three branches of Subrai Vidya Mandir are running in rural areas.

He has also supported activities including the distribution of free medicines, giving health talks and distributing blankets to the underprivileged as part of free medical camps in rural areas. He organized events such as free yoga camps to promote cultural awakening among the youth.

He has written 2 short stories and a novel 1980 (based on the 1980 riots in Tripura) in Kokborok. He published a Kokborok translation of the Bhagavad Gita with in-depth analysis. He translated the Rajmala (The Royal Chronicle of Tripura) and the Tripur Samhita to Kokborok. Another novel Mungkwrwi and a Kokborok translation of Gitanjali, though completed, are yet to be published. Among his non-fictional works, he has written various essays, critical analyses and debates on issues on culture, customs, religion and spirituality in local dailies, magazines and periodicals in Kokborok, Bengali and English.

In 2001, he hosted the website www.tripura.org, which provided in-depth information on various aspects of Tripura.

== Personal life ==
He has three younger siblings - one sister and two brothers. He is married to Dr Madhabi Debbarma, also Chief Medical Officer in MCD, since 1993 and has two daughters.

== Recognition ==
His novel 1980 was praised by critics. It has been included in the curriculum of Tripura University. He was awarded the Radha Mohan Thakur Literary Award and the Salil Krishna Debbarman Memorial Award by Tripura Government in 2006 for this novel.
