= Shyama Charan Tripura =

Indian politician

Member of the Tripura Legislative Assembly
- In office 1983–1988
- Preceded by: Drao Kumar Riang
- Succeeded by: Gour Sankar Reang
- Constituency: Santirbazar

Member of the Tripura Legislative Assembly
- In office 1998–2008
- Preceded by: Purna Mohan Tripura
- Succeeded by: Nirajoy Tripura
- Constituency: Chawamanu

Personal details
- Born: 1939 (1350 T.E)
- Died: 12 June 2010 (1421 T.E)
- Party: Tripura Upajati Juba Samiti; Indigenous Nationalist Party of Twipra
- Known for: Founder of TUJS

Shyama Charan Tripura is an Indian politician and social activist from Tripura. He was a member of the Tripura Legislative Assembly representing Chawamanu in 1998 and 2003. He was elected from Chhawmanu twice and from Santibazar once as an MLA.

He was an advocate for tribal rights.

He was a founder of the Tripura Upajati Juba Samiti and the Indigenous People's Front of Tripura along with Harinath Debbarma.
