= Ashok Debbarma =

Indian politician

Member of the Tripura Legislative Assembly
- In office 09 March 2003 – 2008
- Preceded by: Niranjan Debbarma
- Succeeded by: Kesab Debbarma
- Constituency: Golaghati

Personal details
- Born: Tripura, India
- Party: Indian National Congress
- Education: University of Delhi

Ashok Debbarma is a politician from Tripura. He is a member of the Indian National Congress. He was elected in to the Tripura Legislative Assembly from the Golaghati Assembly constituency in 2003.
