= Birendra Kishore Debbarma =

Indian politician

Member of the Tripura Legislative Assembly
- In office 2018–2023
- Preceded by: Kesab Debbarma
- Succeeded by: Manab Debbarma
- Constituency: Golaghati

Personal details
- Born: Shyamnagar, Takarjala, Tripura
- Party: Bharatiya Janata Party
- Occupation: Politician

Birendra Kishore Debbarma is an Indian politician from Tripura. He is a member of the BJP. He was elected in the 2018 Tripura Legislative Assembly election as a Member of the Legislative Assembly (MLA) representing the Golaghati constituency.
