= Nagendra Jamatia =

Indian politician (c.1948–2019)

Tripura Legislative Assembly
- In office 1977–1993
- Preceded by: Bullu Kuki
- Succeeded by: Debabrata Koloy
- Constituency: Ampinagar
- In office 1998–2008
- Preceded by: Debabrata Koloy
- Succeeded by: Daniel Jamatia
- Constituency: Ampinagar

Minister for Agriculture & Horticulture
- In office 1988–1993

Personal details
- Born: 22 May 1948 Tota Kami, Gomati, Tripura
- Died: 21 January 2019 (aged 70–71)
- Party: Indigenous Nationalist Party of Twipra
- Spouse: Pabitra Rani Jamatia
- Children: 2
- Education: B.A. Literature, Economics
- Alma mater: Maharaja Bir Bikram College
- Occupation: Politician; social activist; columnist

Nagendra Jamatia ( 22 May 1948– 21 January 2019) was an Tiprasa Indian politician from Tripura. A member of the Indigenous Nationalist Party of Twipra, Jamatia served as a cabinet minister of Tripura Government from 1988 to 1993. He was a five-time elected legislator of the Tripura Legislative Assembly from 1977 to 1993 and 1998 to 2008.

== Biography ==
Jamatia was elected as a member of the Tripura Legislative Assembly from Ampinagar as a Tripura Upajati Juba Samiti candidate in 1977, 1983 and 1988. Jamatia brokered peace with the insurgent Tripura National Volunteers in 1988. He served as Agriculture and Horticulture minister of Tripura Government from 1988 to 1993.

Jamatia was also elected as a member of the Tripura Legislative Assembly from Ampinagar as a Tripura Upajati Juba Samiti candidate in 1998. Later, the TUJS, The IPFT and TNV merged to form the Indigenous Nationalist Party of Twipra (INPT). He served as the vice president of the party too. He was elected as a member of the Tripura Legislative Assembly from Ampinagar as an INPT candidate in 2003.

Jamatia was married to Pabitra Rani Jamatia. They had two children.

Jamatia died on 21 January 2019 at the age of 71.
