= Manav Debbarma =

Indian politician from Tripura

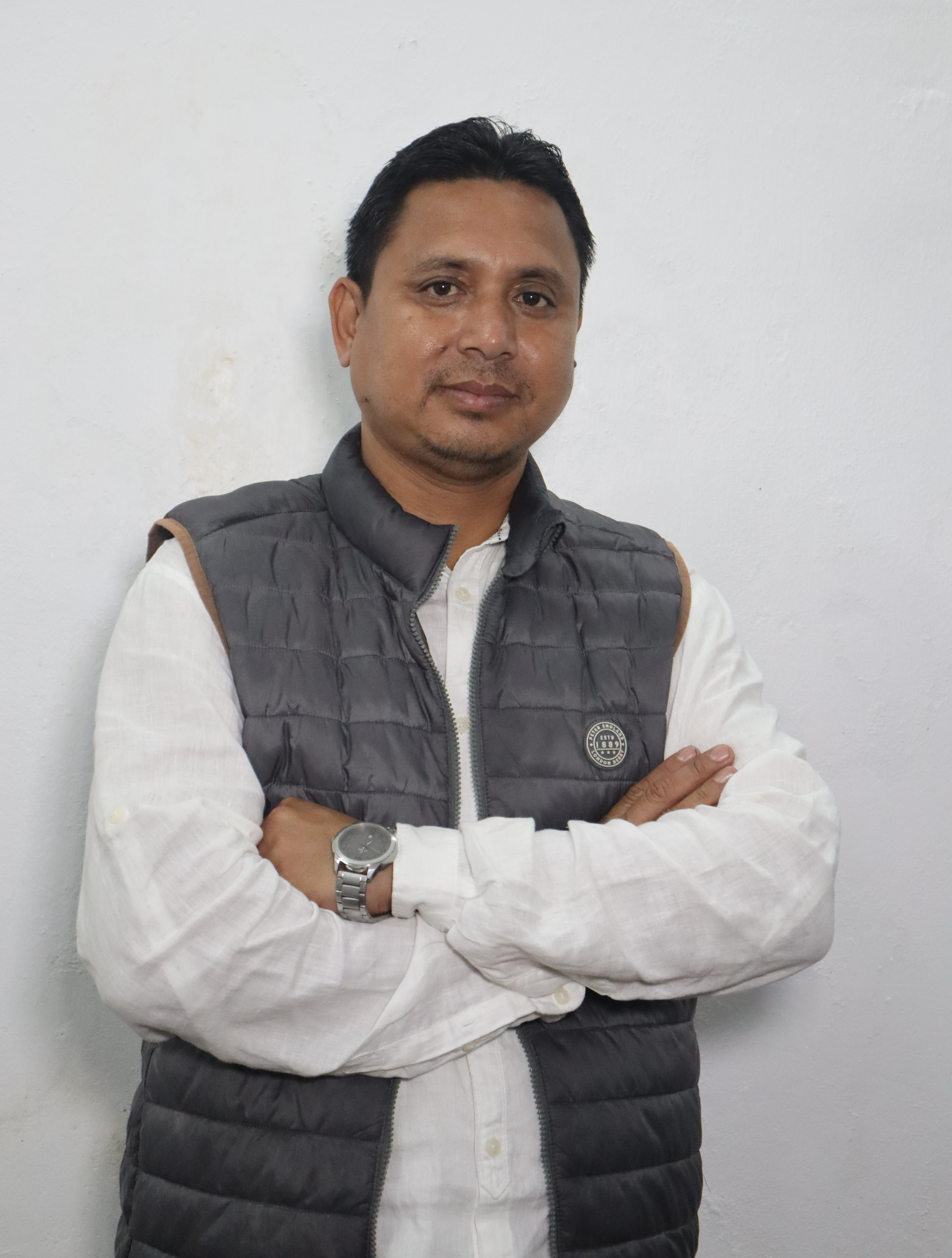

Member of the Tripura Legislative Assembly
- Incumbent
- Assumed office 2023
- Preceded by: Birendra Kishore Debbarma
- Constituency: Golaghati

Personal details
- Born: 3 January 1981 (age 45)
- Party: Tipra Motha Party
- Education: D. Pharma (Diploma in Pharmacy)
- Alma mater: Regional Institute of Pharmaceutical Science and Technology (RIPSAT), Agartala, Tripura
- Profession: Political activist

Manav Debbarma (born 3 January 1981) is a Tipra Indian politician who is a legislator of the Tripura Legislative Assembly from the Golaghati Assembly constituency in India.

== Early life ==
Manav Debbarma was born on 10 January 1982 in Takarjala, Tripura. He belongs to a Tiprasa family from Sepahijala District.

He graduated from the Regional Institute of Pharmaceutical Science and Technology (RIPSAT), Agartala with Diploma of Pharmacy.

Debbarma was elected the president of Twipra Students' Federation, serving from 1995 to 1996.

== Political career ==
Debbarma joined TIPRA Motha after it was formed in 2019. He contested the 2023 Tripura Assembly Election from Golaghati, defeating Himani Debbarma of the Bharatiya Janata Party with a margin of 9198 votes.
