= Rashiram Debbarma =

Indian Tripuri politician (died 2019)

Minister of Ministry of Revenue
- In office 1977–1983

Member of the Tripura Legislative Assembly
- In office 1977–1998
- Preceded by: Kalidas Debbarma
- Succeeded by: Manoranjan Debbarma
- Constituency: Mandaibazar

Personal details
- Died: 5 August 2019 Mandwi
- Party: Communist Party of India (Marxist)
- Spouse: Budhu Laxmi Debbarma

Rashiram Debbarma was an Indian politician. He was elected from the Mandaibazar Vidhan Sabha Constituency in the Tripura Legislative Assembly in 1977, 1983, 1988 and 1993. He died on 5 August 2019.

Rashiram Debbarma contested against Kashirode Debbarma in 1977 from the Mandaibazar constituency and he won.

He contested again in 1983, 1988, 1993 from the same constituency and he was again elected.

== See also ==
- Manoranjan Debbarma
- Radhacharan Debbarma
- Jitendra Choudhury
