= Purna Mohan Tripura =

Indian Tripuri Politician

Minister of Finance & Power
- In office 1978–1988

Member of the Tripura Legislative Assembly
- In office 09 March 1972 – 1993
- Succeeded by: Shyama Charan Tripura
- Constituency: Chawamanu

Personal details
- Born: Tripura, India
- Party: Communist Party of India (Marxist)

Purna Mohan Tripura was a Tipra Indian politician from Tripura. He was a prominent leader of the Communist Party of India (Marxist). He became Member of the Legislative Assembly in 1972 from Chawamanu, which he would represent until 1993. He served as Minister for Finance and Power under Chief Minister Nripen Chakraborty from 1978 to 1988.
