= Padma Kumar Debbarma =

Indian politician

Member of Tripura Legislative Assembly
- In office 1998–2018
- Preceded by: Dasarath Deb
- Succeeded by: Prasanta Debbarma
- Constituency: Ramchandraghat

Personal details
- Born: 15 April 1965 (age 61) Padmabil, Khowai
- Party: CPI(M)
- Spouse: Bina Debbarma

Padma Kumar Debbarma is an Indian politician affiliated with the Communist Party of India (Marxist). He was a member of the Tripura Legislative Assembly from 1998 to 2018. In the 2018 Tripura Legislative Assembly election, he was defeated by the IPFT's candidate Prasanta Debbarma.
