= Kesab Debbarma =

Indian politician

Member of the Tripura Legislative Assembly
- In office 09 March 2008 – 2018
- Preceded by: Ashok Debbarma
- Succeeded by: Birendra Kishore Debbarma
- Constituency: Golaghati

Personal details
- Born: 1975 Tripura, India
- Party: Communist Party of India (Marxist)

Kesab Debbarma is a politician from Tripura. Currently he is leader of Communist Party of India (Marxist). He was elected in the 2008 and 2013 Tripura Legislative Assembly elections from Golaghati, becoming a Member of the Tripura Legislative Assembly.
