= Manoranjan Debbarma =

Indian politician

Member Tripura Legislative Assembly
- In office 1998–2018
- Preceded by: Rashiram Debbarma
- Succeeded by: Dhirendra Debbarma
- Constituency: Mandaibazar ST

Personal details
- Born: 5 August 1962 (age 63) Mandwi, Tripura
- Party: Communist Party of India (Marxist)
- Spouse: Tarumala Deb Barma
- Parent(s): Lt. Rashiram Debbarma; Budhu Laxmi Debbarma
- Education: Madhyamik

Manoranjan Debbarma (born 5 October 1962) is an Indian politician and member of the Communist Party of India (Marxist). He represented the Mandaibaza constituency in the West Tripura district. Debbarma was a member of the Tripura Legislative Assembly from 1998 to 2018.

== See also ==
- Rashiram Debbarma
- Radhacharan Debbarma
- Jitendra Choudhury
