= Niranjan Debbarma =

Indian politician

Member of the Tripura Legislative Assembly
- In office 1977-1983 – 1993-2003
- Succeeded by: 1983 Budha Debbarma; 2003 Ashok Debbarma
- Constituency: Golaghati

Member of the Tripura Legislative Assembly
- In office 09 March 2008 – 2018
- Succeeded by: N. C. Debbarma
- Constituency: Takarjala

Personal details
- Born: Tripura, India
- Party: Communist Party of India (Marxist)

Niranjan Debbarma is a Tipra Indian politician from Tripura who won the 1977, 1993, 1998, 2008, and 2013 Tripura Legislative Assembly elections as a candidate of the Communist Party of India (Marxist). He was the MLA from Golaghati in 1977, 1993, 1998 and from Takarjala in 2008 and 2013.

He is one of the leaders of the Communist Party of India (Marxist).
