= Khagendra Jamatia =

Indian politician

Minister for Fisheries and Home (Fire service)
- In office 2003–2018

Member of Tripura Legislative Assembly,(MLA)
- In office 1988–2018
- Preceded by: Kali Kumar Debbarma
- Succeeded by: Atul Debbarma
- Constituency: Krishnapur

MDC, TTAADC
- In office 1986–1988
- Nominated by: Government of Tripura

Personal details
- Born: 01 January 1954
- Died: 2 March 2018 (aged 64)
- Party: Communist Party of India (Marxist)
- Spouse: Smt. Anjali Jamatia
- Children: 3 (2 sons 1 Daughter)
- Education: Higher Secondary

Khagendra Jamatia (c. 1954 – 2 March 2018) was an Indian politician.

A member of the Communist Party of India (Marxist) since 1983, Jamatia first represented the party while standing in the 1988 Tripura Legislative Assembly elections. He subsequently won reelection five consecutive times, and was again backed by the CPI (M) in the 2018 election cycle. During this campaign, Jamatia was diagnosed with cancer, and died at the All India Institute of Medical Sciences in New Delhi on 2 March 2018, aged 64.
