= Nirajoy Tripura =

Indian politician (1939–2026)

Member of Tripura Legislative Assembly
- In office 2008–2018
- Preceded by: Shyama Charan Tripura
- Succeeded by: Sambhu Lal Chakma
- Constituency: Chawmanu

Personal details
- Born: 12 July 1939 Bengal Province, British India
- Died: 20 June 2026 (aged 86)
- Party: Communist Party of India (Marxist)
- Spouse: Kasha Laxmi Tripura

Nirajoy Tripura (12 July 1939 – 20 June 2026) was an Indian politician who was a member of the Tripura Legislative Assembly. He was a member of the Communist Party of India (Marxist) from 1967. He was first elected in the 2008 Tripura Legislative Assembly election, defeating Shyama Charan Tripura by a margin of 1101 votes. Tripura died on 20 June 2026, at the age of 86.
