= Sindhu Chandra Jamatia =

Indian politician

Member of Tripura Legislative Assembly
- In office 2018–2023
- Constituency: Ampinagar

Personal details
- Party: Indigenous People's Front of Tripura

Sindhu Chandra Jamatia is an Indian politician from Tripura. He is a Member of the Legislative Assembly (MLA) of Tripura representing Ampinagar in the Gomati district. He is affiliated with the Indigenous People's Front of Tripura (IPFT).
