= Tripura Upajati Juba Samiti =

- Abbreviation: TUJS
- Founder: Harinath Debbarma; Shyama Charan Tripura
- Founded: 10 June 1977 (48 years ago)
- Dissolved: 2001
- Succeeded by: INPT; IPFT
- Ideology: Tripuri nationalism
- Alliance: INC
- Colors
- 1988 Tripura Legislative Assembly Election: 7 / 60

Election symbol

Tripura Upajati Juba Samiti ("Tripura Tribal Youth Association") was a political party in the Indian state of Tripura from 1977–2001. During 1988-93, the Indian National Congress (INC) formed a coalition government with the TUJS at the Tripura Legislative Assembly. In 2001, TUJS dissolved and split to form Indigenous Nationalist Party of Twipra & Indigenous People's Front of Tripura.

== Electoral performance ==
The INC-TUJS coalition together won 32 out of the 60 seats at the 1988 Tripura Legislative Assembly election.

== Notable leaders ==
- Shyama Charan Tripura
- Harinath Debbarma
- Nagendra Jamatia
- Drao Kumar Riang
- Budha Debbarma
- Rabindra Debbarma
- Diba Chandra Hrangkhawl
