= 1967 Tripura Legislative Assembly election =

State assembly election in Tripura, India

- 21 Feb 1967

All 30 seats of the Legislative Assembly 16 seats needed for a majority

	First party	Second party
Leader	Sachindra Lal Singh	-
Party	INC	CPI(M)
Leader's seat	Agartala Sadar II	-
Last election	No data available	No data available
Seats won	27	2
Seat change	No data available	No data available
Popular vote	251,345	93,739
Percentage	57.95%	21.61%
CM before election
Sachindra Lal Singh
INC
Elected CM
Sachindra Lal Singh
INC

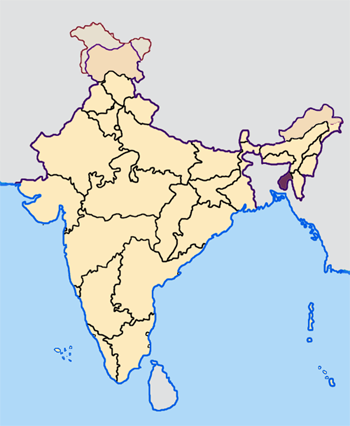
Tripura

Until 1972, Tripura was a Union Territory. The 1967 Tripura Legislative Assembly election took place on 21 February 1967 in a single phase to elect the Members of the Legislative Assembly (MLA) from each of the 30 Assembly Constituencies (ACs) in Tripura, India.

Indian National Congress led by Sachindra Lal Singh, won 27 seats and formed a Government in Tripura union territory.

== Highlights ==
Election to the Tripura Legislative Assembly were held on February 21, 1967. The election were held in a single phase for all the 30 assembly constituencies.

=== Participating Political Parties ===
Num	Partytype Abbreviation	Party
National Parties
1	BJS	Bharatiya Jan Sangh
2	CPI	Communist Party of India
3	CPM	Communist Party of India (Marxist)
4	INC	Indian National Congress
5	SSP	Sanghata Socialist Party
Independents
6	IND	Independent

=== No. of Constituencies ===
Type of Constituencies	GEN	SC	ST	Total
No. of Constituencies	18	3	9	30

=== Electors ===
	Men	Women	Total
No.of Electors	605,934	-	605,934
No.of Electors who Voted	450,334	-	450,334
Polling Percentage	74.32%	-	74.32%

=== Performance of Women Candidates ===
	Men	Women	Total
No.of Contestants	86	01	87
Elected	30	00	30

== Result ==
=== Results by party ===
Party	Seats Contested	Seats Won	Votes	Vote %	1963 Seats
Indian National Congress	30	27	251,345	57.95%	No data available
Communist Party of India (Marxist)	16	2	93,739	21.61%	No data available
Communist Party of India	7	1	34,562	7.97%	No data available
Bharatiya Jana Sangh	5	0	1,506	0.35%	No data available
Sanghata Socialist Party	1	0	83	0.02%	No data available
Independents	28	0	52,457	12.10%	No data available
Total	87	30	433,692		
Source: ECI

=== Results by constituency ===
Winner, runner-up, voter turnout, and victory margin in every constituency
Assembly Constituency		Turnout	Winner				Runner Up				Margin
#k	Names	%	Candidate	Party	Votes	%	Candidate	Party	Votes	%	Margin
1	Mohanpur	74.%	Pram D. Ranjan Dasgupta	INC	8,666	55.27%	N. Chakravorty	CPI(M)	6,882	43.89%	1,784
2	Agartala Sadar I	76.68%	B. B. Das	INC	8,117	60.38%	M. K. Roy	CPI(M)	3,468	25.8%	4,649
3	Agartala Sadar II	73.96%	S. Singh	INC	11,445	64.42%	S. R. Chanda	CPI(M)	5,837	32.85%	5,608
4	Agartala Sadar III	75.57%	T. M. D. Gupta	INC	8,872	57.18%	S. S. Gupta	Independent	5,283	34.05%	3,589
5	Agartala Town	73.11%	K. Bhattacharjee	INC	6,853	54.26%	A. Islam	CPI	4,250	33.65%	2,603
6	Old Agartala	81.04%	J. K. Majumder	INC	8,672	54.6%	Sailesh Chandra Some	Independent	7,211	45.4%	1,461
7	Uttar Debendranagar	75.32%	A. D. Barma	CPI(M)	10,559	72.09%	B. P. D. Barma	INC	4,088	27.91%	6,471
8	Takarjala	67.79%	M. D. Barma	INC	6,945	54.84%	B. D. Barma	Independent	5,720	45.16%	1,225
9	Bishalgarh	74.02%	U. L. Singh	INC	8,072	55.59%	B. M. Saha	Independent	6,136	42.26%	1,936
10	Charilam	73.27%	A. Debbarma	CPI	7,230	50.68%	K. C. D. Barma	INC	7,037	49.32%	193
11	Sonamura North	82.1%	Debendra Kishore Chowdhury	INC	8,807	74.%	D. C. S. Gupta	Independent	2,439	20.49%	6,368
12	Sonamura South	83.28%	B. Ali	INC	7,888	65.58%	B. R. Pal	Independent	4,140	34.42%	3,748
13	Salgarh	74.8%	E. A. Chowdhury	INC	8,424	71.09%	N. C. Ghose	CPI(M)	2,335	19.7%	6,089
14	Radhakishorpur	72.54%	N. K. Sarkar	INC	10,878	67.87%	Sunil Krishna Das	CPI	3,117	19.45%	7,761
15	Belonia	77.29%	U. K. Roy	INC	10,502	60.05%	Jitendra Lal Das	CPI	6,691	38.26%	3,811
16	Muhuripur	73.%	S. C. Chowdhury	INC	11,584	76.29%	Hlura Aung Mog	CPI	2,875	18.93%	8,709
17	Sabroom	77.56%	A. Mag	INC	11,638	69.93%	A. Mag	CPI	4,642	27.89%	6,996
18	Birganj	64.36%	B. B. Riyan	INC	6,152	55.49%	R. K. D. Barma	CPI(M)	4,348	39.22%	1,804
19	Dumburnagar	61.5%	R. C. D. Rankhal	INC	5,221	56.72%	S. D. Barma	CPI(M)	3,984	43.28%	1,237
20	Teliamura	73.53%	P. K. Das	INC	11,558	64.6%	A. C. Sarker	CPI(M)	5,435	30.38%	6,123
21	Kalyanpur	89.71%	Bidya Chandra Debbarma	CPI(M)	14,330	62.57%	N. K. D. Barma	INC	8,572	37.43%	5,758
22	Khowai	85.14%	S. C. Datta	INC	10,964	61.06%	J. Bhattacharjee	Independent	6,650	37.03%	4,314
23	Kamalpur	79.11%	K. C. Das	INC	10,141	63.07%	N. K. Namadas	CPI(M)	5,939	36.93%	4,202
24	Kulaihower	58.9%	G. Dewan	INC	8,406	57.05%	D. D. Barma	CPI(M)	6,329	42.95%	2,077
25	Fatikroy	69.68%	Radhika Ranjan Gupta	INC	7,750	55.9%	Rakhal Raj Kumar	CPI	5,757	41.52%	1,993
26	Kailashahar	81.63%	M. L. Bhowmik	INC	8,190	51.09%	B. Majumder	CPI(M)	7,841	48.91%	349
27	Dharmanagar South	74.81%	M. Nath	INC	8,354	64.12%	R. K. Nath	CPI(M)	4,674	35.88%	3,680
28	Kanchanpur	57.06%	R. P. Chowdhury	INC	5,192	64.63%	Mandida Reang	CPI(M)	2,485	30.93%	2,707
29	Dharmanagar North	73.85%	B. B. Banerjee	INC	6,467	52.59%	D. Chakraborty	CPI(M)	3,437	27.95%	3,030
30	Kadamtala	68.91%	A. Wazid	INC	5,890	47.35%	S. D. Nath	CPI(M)	5,856	47.08%	34

== Government formation ==
Indian National Congress,(INC) won a majority of the 30 seats in the assembly. Sachindra Lal Singh of the INC continued as Chief Minister.
