= Jadu Prasanna Bhattacharjee =

Jadu Prasanna Bhattacharjee was an Indian politician and a member of the Tripura Legislative Assembly from the Khowai Assembly constituency following the 1972 Tripura Legislative Assembly election.
