= Muhuripur Assembly constituency =

Constituency of the Tripura legislative assembly in India

Coordinates: 23.23°N 91.57°E

Muhuripur
- Former constituency for the Tripura Legislative Assembly

Constituency details
- Country: India
- Region: Northeast India
- State: Tripura
- Established: 1963
- Abolished: 1972
- Total electors: 13,917

Muhuripur was an assembly constituency in the India state of Tripura.

== Members of the Legislative Assembly ==
Election	Member	Party
1967	S. C. Chowdhury	Indian National Congress
1972	Achaichhi Mog	Indian National Congress

== Election results ==
=== 1972 Assembly election ===
1972 Tripura Legislative Assembly election: Muhuripur
Party	Candidate	Votes	%	±%
INC	Achaichhi Mog	4,394	55.93%	▼20.36
CPI(M)	Brajamohan Jamatia	2,583	32.88%	New
CPI	Hlura Aung Mog	879	11.19%	▼7.75
Margin of victory		1,811	23.05%	▼34.30
Turnout		7,856	58.60%	▼14.24
Registered electors		13,917		▼35.21
INC hold		Swing	▼20.36	

=== 1967 Assembly election ===
1967 Tripura Legislative Assembly election: Muhuripur
Party	Candidate	Votes	%	±%
INC	S. C. Chowdhury	11,584	76.29%	New
CPI	Hlura Aung Mog	2,875	18.93%	New
Independent	N. G. Sarkar	725	4.77%	New
Margin of victory		8,709	57.36%	
Turnout		15,184	73.00%	
Registered electors		21,480		
INC win (new seat)				
