= Nirmal Biswas =

Indian politician

Member of the Tripura Legislative Assembly
- Incumbent
- Assumed office 2018
- Preceded by: Samir Deb Sarkar
- Constituency: Khowai

Personal details
- Citizenship: Indian
- Political party: Communist Party of India (Marxist)
- Profession: Politician

Nirmal Biswas is an Indian politician and Member of Tripura Legislative Assembly representing Khowai. He belongs to the Communist Party of India.

== See also ==
- 2018 Tripura Legislative Assembly election
- 2023 Tripura Legislative Assembly election
