= Hlura Aung Mog =

Hlura Aung Mog was an Indian politician, belonging to the Communist Party of India (CPI). He was elected to the Tripura Territorial Council twice, representing the Muhuripur constituency in the Territorial Council between 1957 and 1963.

In 1963 the Territorial Council was replaced by the Tripura Legislative Assembly, with the Territorial Council deputies elected in 1962 becoming Members of the Legislative Assembly. Mog was a member of the CPI faction in the legislature, as the member representing the Muhuripur seat.

Mog sided with the CPI in the 1964 party split. He stood as the CPI candidate for the Muhuripur seat in the 1967 Tripura Legislative Assembly election. He finished in second place with 2,875 votes (18.93%). He again contested the Muhuripur seat as the CPI candidate in the 1972 Tripura Legislative Assembly election, finishing in third place with 879 votes (11.19%). In the 1977 Tripura Legislative Assembly election Mog stood as the CPI candidate for the Jolaibari seat - finishing in fifth place with 418 votes (4.24%).
