= Narayan Rupini =

Indian politician (1947–2022)

Minister of Government of Tripura
- In office 1998–2013
- Chief Minister: Manik Sarkar

Member of the Tripura Legislative Assembly
- In office 1998–2013
- Preceded by: Ashok Debbarma
- Succeeded by: Ramendra Narayan Debbarma
- Constituency: Charilam

Chairman of TTAADC
- In office 1982–1998
- Preceded by: Position established

Personal details
- Born: 1947 Champaknagar, Tripura (princely state)
- Died: 24 December 2022 (aged 74–75)
- Party: Communist Party of India (Marxist)
- Occupation: Politician

Narayan Rupini (1947 – 24 December 2022) was an Indian politician from Tripura. He was the first chairman of the Tripura Tribal Areas Autonomous District Council. He served as a cabinet minister in the Government of Tripura from 1998 to 2013. Rupini was a member of Tripura Legislative Assembly for three consecutive terms from 1998 to 2013 representing the Charilam Assembly constituency. He also served as the President of Ganamukti Parishad from 2010 to 2016.
