= Charilam Assembly constituency =

Legislative Assembly constituency in Tripura State, India

Coordinates: 23.64°N 91.31°E

Charilam
- Constituency No. 19 for the Tripura Legislative Assembly

Constituency details
- Country: India
- Region: Northeast India
- State: Tripura
- District: Sipahijala
- Lok Sabha constituency: Tripura West
- Established: 1967
- Total electors: 39,998
- Reservation: ST

Member of Legislative Assembly
- 13th Tripura Legislative Assembly
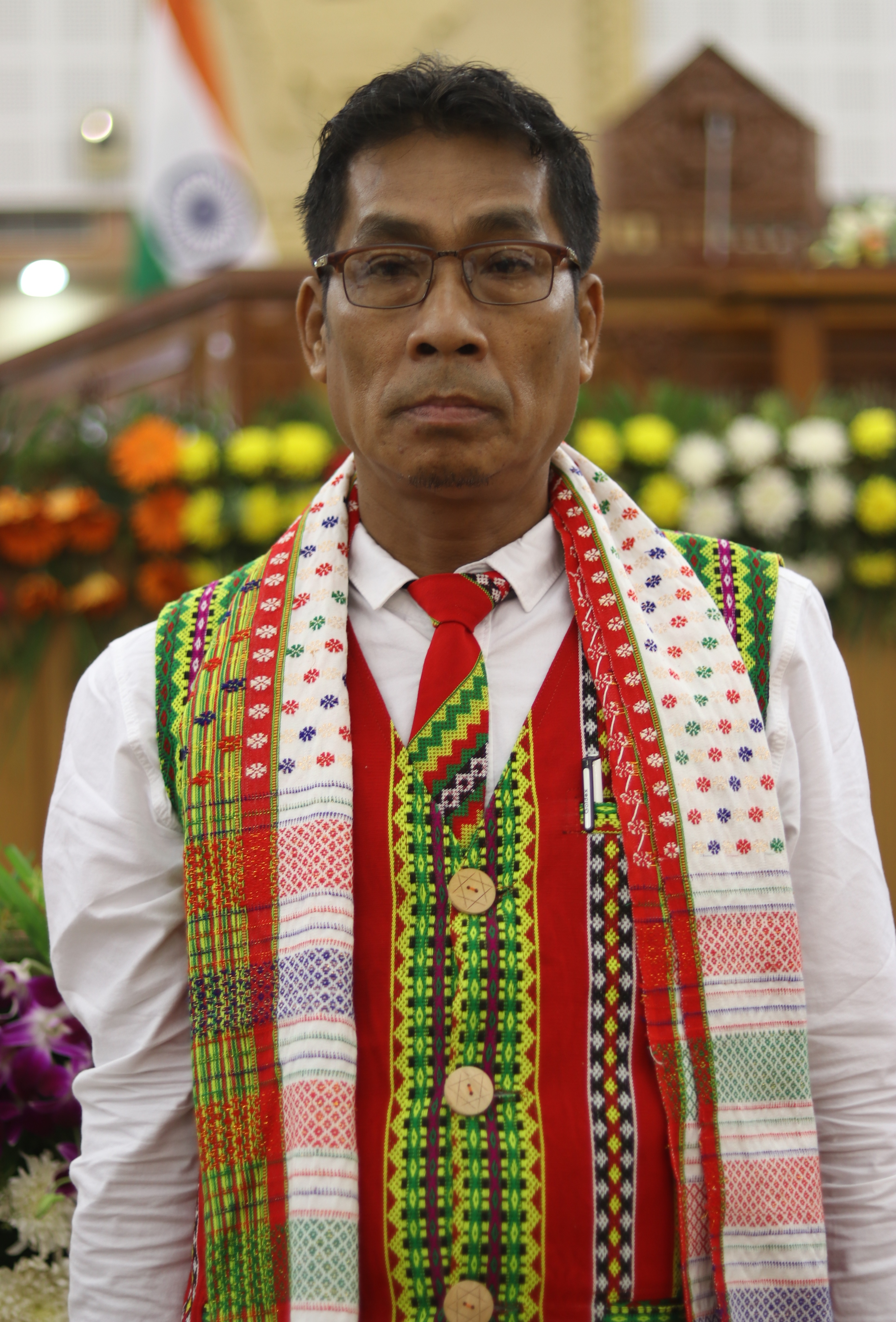
- Incumbent Subodh Deb Barma
- Party: TMP
- Alliance: NDA
- Elected year: 2023

Charilam is one of the 60 Legislative Assembly constituencies of Tripura state in India. It is in Sipahijala district and is reserved for candidates belonging to the Scheduled Tribes. It forms part of the Tripura West (Lok Sabha constituency).

== Members of the Legislative Assembly ==
Election	Member	Party
1967	A. Debbarma	Communist Party of India
1972	Niranjan Deb	Communist Party of India
1977	Harinath Debbarma	Tripura Upajati Juba Samiti
1983	Parimal Chandra Saha	Indian National Congress
1988	Matilal Saha	Indian National Congress
1993	Ahok Debbarma	Indian National Congress
1998	Narayan Rupini	Communist Party of India
2003	Narayan Rupini	Communist Party of India
2008	Narayan Rupini	Communist Party of India
2013	Ramendra Narayan Debbarma	Communist Party of India
2018	Jishnu Dev Varma	Bharatiya Janata Party
2023	Subodh Deb Barma	Tipra Motha Party

== Election results ==
=== 2023 Assembly election ===
2023 Tripura Legislative Assembly election: Charilam
Party	Candidate	Votes	%	±%
TMP	Subodh Deb Barma	13,657	37.34	New
BJP	Jishnu Dev Varma	12,799	34.99	▼55.82
INC	Ashok Debbarma	9,627	26.32	▲23.67
NOTA	None of the Above	496	1.36	▼0.30
Margin of victory		858	2.35	▼84.94
Turnout		36,579	91.59	▲12.21
Registered electors		39,998		▲8.28
TMP gain from BJP		Swing	▼53.47	

=== 2018 Assembly election ===
2018 Tripura Legislative Assembly election: Charilam
Party	Candidate	Votes	%	±%
BJP	Jishnu Dev Varma	26,580	90.81	New
CPI(M)	Palash Debbarma	1,030	3.52	▼47.42
INC	Arjun Debbarma	775	2.65	▼44.15
INPT	Uma Sankar Debbarma	685	2.34	New
NOTA	None of the Above	485	1.66	New
Independent	Jyotilal Debbarma	198	0.68	New
Margin of victory		25,550	87.29	▲83.14
Turnout		29,271	80.55	▼14.48
Registered electors		36,939		▲7.02
BJP gain from CPI(M)		Swing	▲39.87	

=== 2013 Assembly election ===
2013 Tripura Legislative Assembly election: Charilam
Party	Candidate	Votes	%	±%
CPI(M)	Ramendra Narayan Debbarma	16,479	50.94	▲1.50
INC	Himani Debbarma	15,138	46.79	New
IPFT	Rammohan Debbarma	733	2.27	New
Margin of victory		1,341	4.15	▲2.45
Turnout		32,350	93.80	▲1.74
Registered electors		34,517		
CPI(M) hold		Swing		

=== 2008 Assembly election ===
2008 Tripura Legislative Assembly election: Charilam
Party	Candidate	Votes	%	±%
CPI(M)	Narayan Rupini	14,216	49.44	▲1.37
INPT	Narendra Chandra Debbarma	13,729	47.75	▼0.07
Independent	Harendra Debbarma	466	1.62	New
Independent	Bidhyasagar Debbarma	343	1.19	New
Margin of victory		487	1.69	▲1.44
Turnout		28,754	92.28	▲17.99
Registered electors		31,259		
CPI(M) hold		Swing	▲1.37	

=== 2003 Assembly election ===
2003 Tripura Legislative Assembly election: Charilam
Party	Candidate	Votes	%	±%
CPI(M)	Narayan Rupini	10,573	48.07	▼1.53
INPT	Narendra Chandra Debbarma	10,517	47.81	New
Independent	Swapan Debbarma	285	1.30	New
LJP	Bishu Kumar Debbarma	270	1.23	New
Independent	Jishnu Debbarma	244	1.11	New
Margin of victory		56	0.25	▼4.36
Turnout		21,996	74.20	▼3.03
Registered electors		29,727		▲5.01
CPI(M) hold		Swing	▼1.53	

=== 1998 Assembly election ===
1998 Tripura Legislative Assembly election: Charilam
Party	Candidate	Votes	%	±%
CPI(M)	Narayan Rupini	10,815	49.60	New
Independent	Ananta Debbarma	9,809	44.99	New
BJP	Sumanta Debbarma	663	3.04	▲1.37
Independent	Harinath Debbarma	305	1.40	New
AMB	Ranita Sangma	118	0.54	New
Margin of victory		1,006	4.61	▲1.58
Turnout		21,805	79.89	▲1.26
Registered electors		28,308		▼1.86
CPI(M) gain from INC		Swing	▲2.51	

=== 1993 Assembly election ===
1993 Tripura Legislative Assembly election: Charilam
Party	Candidate	Votes	%	±%
INC	Ahok Debbarma	10,292	47.09	▼4.45
CPI	Aghore Debbarma	9,628	44.05	New
Independent	Binoy Debbarma	1,114	5.10	New
BJP	Rebati Debbarma	366	1.67	New
Independent	Bijoy Debbarma	242	1.11	New
Independent	Haricharan Debbarma	151	0.69	New
Margin of victory		664	3.04	▼1.80
Turnout		21,855	76.84	▼6.77
Registered electors		28,844		▲26.78
INC hold		Swing	▼4.45	

=== 1988 Assembly election ===
1988 Tripura Legislative Assembly election: Charilam
Party	Candidate	Votes	%	±%
INC	Matilal Saha	9,680	51.54	▼1.15
CPI(M)	Brajgopal Bhowmic	8,772	46.71	▲1.59
Independent	Shyamal Kanti Roy	328	1.75	New
Margin of victory		908	4.83	▼2.74
Turnout		18,780	84.01	▲0.58
Registered electors		22,752		▲15.24
INC hold		Swing		

=== 1983 Assembly election ===
1983 Tripura Legislative Assembly election: Charilam
Party	Candidate	Votes	%	±%
INC	Parimal Chandra Saha	8,528	52.70	▲38.65
CPI(M)	Braja Gopal Bhowmik	7,302	45.12	▲19.94
Independent	Braja Lal Saha	300	1.85	New
Margin of victory		1,226	7.58	▼0.44
Turnout		16,183	83.44	▲3.90
Registered electors		19,744		▲20.13
INC gain from TUS		Swing		

=== 1977 Assembly election ===
1977 Tripura Legislative Assembly election: Charilam
Party	Candidate	Votes	%	±%
TUS	Harinath Debbarma	4,259	33.20	▲17.45
CPI(M)	Durga Prasad Sikdar	3,231	25.18	▼11.60
INC	Swapan Kumar Dutta	1,802	14.05	▼18.40
JP	Pravesh Chandra Saha	1,625	12.67	New
TPCC	Captain Chatterjee	1,202	9.37	New
Independent	Mohan Chowdhury	388	3.02	New
CPI	Kumud Ranjan Kundu Chowdhury	212	1.65	New
Independent	Rebati Debbarma	111	0.87	New
Margin of victory		1,028	8.01	▲3.67
Turnout		12,830	79.78	▲13.22
Registered electors		16,436		▲39.75
TUS gain from CPI(M)		Swing	▼3.59	

=== 1972 Assembly election ===
1972 Tripura Legislative Assembly election: Charilam
Party	Candidate	Votes	%	±%
CPI(M)	Niranjan Deb	2,805	36.78	New
INC	Monmohan Debbarma	2,474	32.44	▼16.88
TUS	Barada Kanta Debbarma	1,201	15.75	New
Independent	Gourchand Debbarma	926	12.14	New
Independent	M. K. Nakshatra Bikram	220	2.88	New
Margin of victory		331	4.34	▲2.99
Turnout		7,626	67.03	▼5.71
Registered electors		11,761		▼41.84
CPI(M) gain from CPI		Swing	▼13.89	

=== 1967 Assembly election ===
1967 Tripura Legislative Assembly election: Charilam
Party	Candidate	Votes	%	±%
CPI	A. Debbarma	7,230	50.68	New
INC	K. C. D. Barma	7,037	49.32	New
Margin of victory		193	1.35	
Turnout		14,267	73.27	
Registered electors		20,222		
CPI win (new seat)				

== See also ==
- List of constituencies of the Tripura Legislative Assembly
- Sipahijala district
