= Biswajit Datta =

Indian politician

Biswajit Datta was an Indian politician and a member of the Tripura Legislative Assembly from the Khowai Assembly constituency.
