= Birchandra Manu massacre =

- Location: Birchandra Manu village, Belonia sub-division, southern Tripura, India
- Date: 12 October 1988
- Target: Communist Party of India (Marxist) office
- Deaths: 13+
- Perpetrator: Indian National Congress

On 12 October 1988, activists of the Indian National Congress attacked a Communist Party of India (Marxist) office in Birchandra Manu village, Belonia sub-division in southern Tripura, India. The attack took place whilst the CPI(M) cadres were hoisting a red flag to mark the re-opening of their local party office (which had been closed following previous attacks from Congress workers) at 4 pm. Present at the hoisting ceremony were two prominent CPI(M) leaders, the Tripura Tribal Areas Autonomous District Council member Sridam Pal and the Tripura Legislative Assembly member Brajamohan Jamatia.

Eleven CPI(M) cadres were killed. Sridam Pal was amongst the dead, whilst Brajamohan Jamatia narrowly escaped death. Other victims included village pradhans and members of the divisional committee of the party. Two security officers, attached to Sridam Pal, were killed whilst trying to halt the attack.

The Tripura state government (the state was governed by an Indian National Congress-Tripura Upajati Juba Samiti coalition at the time) stated that the killings had been a clash between two parties. The CPI(M), in a statement issued by its Politburo, refuted this claim and argued that the violence had been a pre-meditated attack intended to eliminate CPI(M) cadres.

A martyrs' column was erected in Birchandra Manu in remembrance of the people killed in the event. In March 2011, the Congress leader Subal Bhowmik expressed an unconditional apology for various violent incidents during the rule of his party in the state during 1988 and 1993, including the Birchandra Manu killings.
