= Bhanu Lal Saha =

Indian politician

Member of Tripura Legislative Assembly
- In office 2008–2023
- Preceded by: Samir Ranjan Barman
- Succeeded by: Sushanta Deb
- Constituency: Bishalgarh
- In office 1983–1988
- Preceded by: Gautam Prasad Dutta
- Succeeded by: Samir Ranjan Barman
- Constituency: Bishalgarh

Deputy Speaker of Tripura Legislative Assembly
- In office 19 March 2008 – 28 February 2013
- Preceded by: Subal Rudra
- Succeeded by: Pabitra Kar

Personal details
- Party: Communist Party of India (Marxist)

Bhanu Lal Saha is an Indian politician and a former member of the 5th, 10th, 11th and 12th Tripura Legislative Assemblies. He was also a former Finance Minister of Tripura. He belongs to the Communist Party of India (Marxist) and represented the Bishalgarh constituency.
