= Jashabir Tripura =

Indian politician

Member of Tripura Legislative Assembly
- In office 2003–2023
- Preceded by: Gitamohan Tripura
- Succeeded by: Sukla Charan Noatia
- Constituency: Jolaibari

Personal details
- Born: 1 February 1959 (age 67) Jolaibari
- Party: Communist Party of India (Marxist)
- Spouse: Smt. Puthimala Tripura

Jashabir Tripura (born 1 Feb 1959) is an Indian politician who served as a member of Tripura Legislative Assembly from the Jolaibari constituency from 2003 to 2023. He is a member of the Communist Party of India (Marxist) and a Central Committee member of Ganamukti Parishad.

== Political career ==
Jashabir was employed as a teacher for the Tripura Government. He was also a member of the T.G.T.A & T.U.K.C from 1998 to 2002. In the 2003 Tripura Assembly election, he was elected for the first time on a CPI(M) ticket from the Jolaibari constituency. He was re-elected as an M.L.A in 2008, 2013 and 2018.

== See also ==
- Jitendra Choudhury
- Radhacharan Debbarma
- Pravat Chowdhury
