= Ananda Nagar Assembly constituency =

Constituency of the Tripura legislative assembly in India

Ananda Nagar
- Former constituency for the Tripura Legislative Assembly

Constituency details
- Country: India
- Region: Northeast India
- State: Tripura
- Established: 1971
- Abolished: 1976
- Total electors: 14,463

Ananda Nagar Assembly constituency was an assembly constituency in the Indian state of Tripura.

== Members of the Legislative Assembly ==
Election	Member	Party
1972	Tarit Mohan Dasgupta	Indian National Congress

== Election results ==
=== 1972 Assembly election ===
1972 Tripura Legislative Assembly election: Ananda Nagar
Party	Candidate	Votes	%	±%
INC	Tarit Mohan Dasgupta	4,341	45.07%	New
CPI(M)	Khagen Das	4,159	43.18%	New
Independent	Dilip Kumar Sarkar	1,132	11.75%	New
Margin of victory		182	1.89%	
Turnout		9,632	68.21%	
Registered electors		14,463		
INC win (new seat)				
