= Sonamura North Assembly constituency =

Constituency of the Tripura legislative assembly in India

Sonamura North
- Former constituency for the Tripura Legislative Assembly

Constituency details
- Country: India
- Region: Northeast India
- State: Tripura
- Established: 1963
- Abolished: 1967
- Total electors: 15,206

Sonamura North Assembly constituency was an assembly constituency in the Indian state of Tripura.

== Members of the Legislative Assembly ==
Election	Member	Party
1967	Debendra Kishore Chowdhury	Indian National Congress

== Election results ==
=== 1967 Assembly election ===
1967 Tripura Legislative Assembly election: Sonamura North
Party	Candidate	Votes	%	±%
INC	Debendra Kishore Chowdhury	8,807	74.00%	New
Independent	D. C. S. Gupta	2,439	20.49%	New
Independent	G. C. Das	655	5.50%	New
Margin of victory		6,368	53.51%	
Turnout		11,901	82.10%	
Registered electors		15,206		
INC win (new seat)				
