= Jishnu Dev Varma =

Governor of Maharashtra

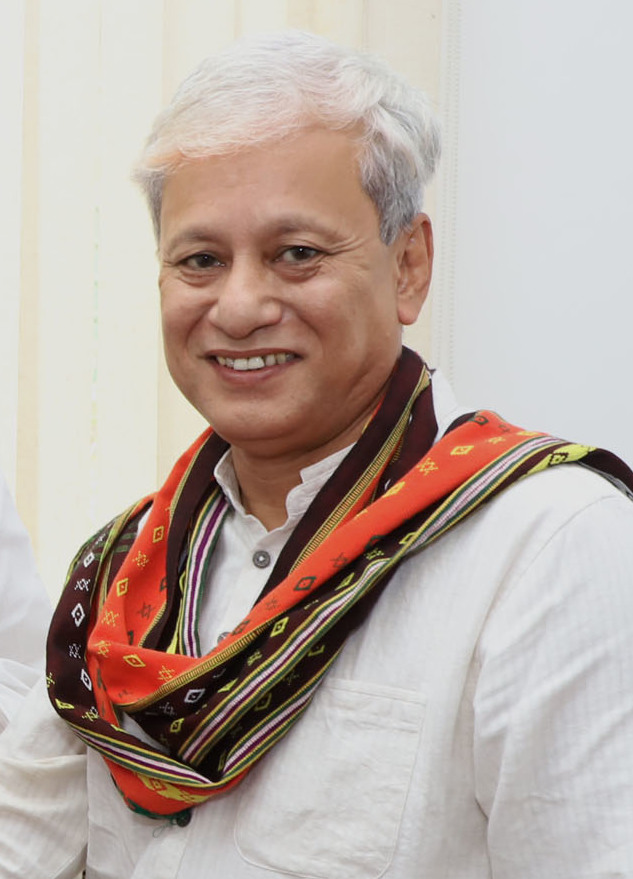
- Dev Varma, c. 2024

23rd Governor of Maharashtra
- Incumbent
- Assumed office 10 March 2026
- Chief Minister: Devendra Fadnavis
- Deputy Chief Minister: Eknath Shinde; Sunetra Pawar
- Preceded by: Acharya Devvrat (additional charge)

Governor of Telangana
- In office 31 July 2024 – 10 March 2026
- Chief Minister: Anumula Revanth Reddy
- Deputy Chief Minister: Mallu Bhatti Vikramarka
- Preceded by: C. P. Radhakrishnan (additional charge)
- Succeeded by: Shiv Pratap Shukla

3rd Deputy Chief Minister of Tripura
- In office 9 March 2018 – 2 March 2023
- Chief Minister: Biplab Kumar Deb; Manik Saha
- Portfolios: Finance; Power; Rural Development (including Panchayat); Planning and Coordination (including Statistics); TREDA; Science, Technology, and Environment
- Preceded by: Baidyanath Majumder
- Constituency: Charilam

Personal details
- Born: Jishnu Dev Varma; 15 August 1957 (age 69) Tripura, India
- Party: Bharatiya Janata Party
- Spouse: Sudha Debbarma
- Relations: Maharaja Bir Bikram Kishore Manikya Bahadur (uncle); Pradyot Bikram Manikya Deb Barma (nephew); Kriti Devi Debbarman (niece)
- Children: 2
- Education: University of Calcutta (B.A. Hons. English Literature); St. Joseph's School, Darjeeling

Jishnu Dev Varma (born 15 August 1957), is an Indian politician serving as the Governor of Maharashtra since 2026. He previously served as Governor of Telangana from 2024 till 2026. He is from Tripura, and has previously served as the 3rd Deputy Chief Minister of Tripura from 2018 to 2023. He served as the MLA of Charilam from 2018 till 2023. He was the head of the Badminton Association of India, and was formerly the president of its Tripura unit.

== Early life and education ==
Jishnu Dev Varma was born in Agartala, Tripura on 15 August 1957. His father Ramendra Kishore Debbarma was the military secretary and home secretary to Maharaja Bir Bikram Manikya.

Dev Varma is a member of the Tripura royal family and is the uncle of Pradyot Bikram Manikya Deb Barma and Kriti Devi Debbarman.

He received his B.A. Honours from Calcutta University.

== Politics ==
Dev Varma joined the Bharatiya Janata Party in early 1990s during the Ram Janmabhoomi movement. In 1993, he was made a national general secretary of the party. In the 2018 Tripura Legislative Assembly election, he won the seat of Charilam with a margin of over 25,000 votes. He received 89% of the 29,753 valid votes polled in the bypoll. He defeated Arjun Debbarma of the Congress. He was also chosen to be the Deputy Chief Minister of Tripura. During this term, he held the portfolios of Finance, Power, Rural Development (including Panchayat), Planning and Coordination, TREDA, Science, Technology & Environment.

He was chosen as the Chairman of the North East Regional Power Committee (NERPC) on 22 September 2022.

In the 2023 Tripura Legislative Assembly election, he was the richest candidate from Tripura. He lost to his rival Subodh Deb Barma, who represented the Tipra Motha Party, the only member of the incumbent cabinet to lose re-election.

Jishnu Dev Varma was appointed as Governor of Telangana by President Droupadi Murmu on 27 July 2024, and took office on 31 July 2024. On 6 March 2026, Dev Varma was appointed as the Governor of Maharashtra and assumed office on 10 March 2026.

== Personal life ==
Jishnu Dev Varma is married to Sudha Debbarma. They have two sons: Pratik Kishore Dev Varma and Jaibant Kishore Dev Varma. He has 3 sisters. Dev Varma's half brother was Bharat Dev Varma who was the husband of the actress Moon Moon Sen and father of Raima Sen Dev Varma and Riya Sen Dev Varma.

== Bibliography ==
=== Books ===
- Dev Varma, Jishnu (2025), Master of Time: Journey Through an Ancient Kingdom, PP Publication
- Dev Varma, Jishnu (2024), The Children of Water Goddess, Bhabani Books
- Dev Varma, Jishnu (2024), Views, Reviews, and My Poems, Bhabani Books

=== Articles ===
- Dev Varma, Jishnu (2023), Con (Fusion) Of Language and Origin, Tripura Chronicle
- Dev Varma, Jishnu (2022), Looking Back, Tripura Chronicle
- Dev Varma, Jishnu (2022), Maharaja Bir Bikram College: A Dream College, Tripura Chronicle
- Dev Varma, Jishnu (2022), Indigenous Wisdom- Man and Nature
- Dev Varma, Jishnu (2022), The Indigenous World View. (Man And Nature), Tripura Net, archived from the original on 12 December 2024
