= Agartala Town III Assembly constituency =

Constituency of the Tripura legislative assembly in India

Agartala Town III
- Former constituency for the Tripura Legislative Assembly

Constituency details
- Country: India
- Region: Northeast India
- State: Tripura
- Established: 1971
- Abolished: 1976
- Total electors: 15,188

Agartala Town III Assembly constituency was an assembly constituency in the Indian state of Tripura.

== Members of the Legislative Assembly ==
| Election | Member | Party |
|---|---|---|
| 1972 | Sukhamoy Sen Gupta | Indian National Congress |

== Election results ==
=== 1972 Assembly election ===
1972 Tripura Legislative Assembly election: Agartala Town III
| Party | Candidate | Votes | % | ±% |
|---|---|---|---|---|
| INC | Sukhamoy Sen Gupta | 4,415 | 49.44% | New |
| CPI(M) | Supriyo Bhowmik | 2,963 | 33.18% | New |
| AIFB | Dwijen Dey | 1,048 | 11.74% | New |
| Independent | Promod Bhatta Chowdhury | 404 | 4.52% | New |
| Independent | Sadhan Chandra Debnath | 100 | 1.12% | New |
| Margin of victory | | 1,452 | 16.26% | |
| Turnout | | 8,930 | 59.74% | |
| Registered electors | | 15,188 | | |
| INC win (new seat) | | | | |
