= Deocherra Assembly constituency =

Constituency of the Tripura legislative assembly in India

Coordinates: 24.32°N 92.16°E

Deocherra
- Former constituency for the Tripura Legislative Assembly

Constituency details
- Country: India
- Region: Northeast India
- State: Tripura
- Established: 1971
- Abolished: 1976
- Total electors: 12,463

Deocherra Assembly constituency was an assembly constituency in the Indian state of Tripura.

== Members of the Legislative Assembly ==
Election	Member	Party
1972	Abdul Wazid	Indian National Congress

== Election results ==
=== 1972 Assembly election ===
1972 Tripura Legislative Assembly election: Deocherra
Party	Candidate	Votes	%	±%
INC	Abdul Wazid	3,399	44.97%	New
Independent	Karunamoy Nath Chowdhury	1,870	24.74%	New
CPI(M)	Sayed Abdul Rasid	1,019	13.48%	New
AIFB	Sailen Dhar	712	9.42%	New
Independent	Parindra Chandra Malakar	256	3.39%	New
Independent	Golapjit Rajkumar	237	3.14%	New
Independent	Kshirode Nath	40	0.53%	New
Margin of victory		1,529	20.23%	
Turnout		7,559	62.76%	
Registered electors		12,463		
INC win (new seat)				
