= Subodh Deb Barma =

Indian politician

- Khatung
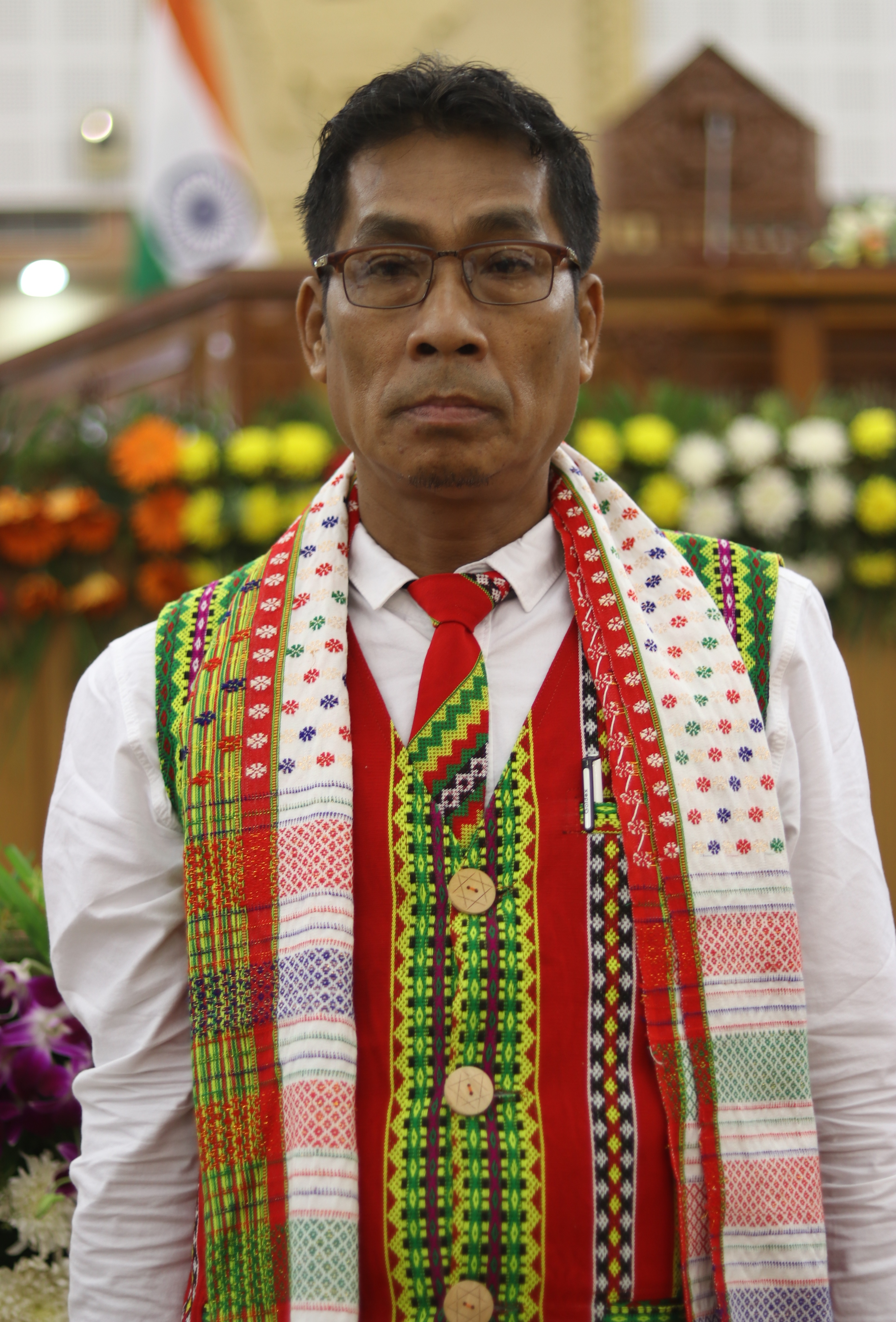

Member of the Tripura Legislative Assembly
- Incumbent
- Assumed office 4 March 2023
- Preceded by: Jishnu Dev Varma
- Constituency: Charilam

Personal details
- Born: 1 June 1971 (age 54)
- Party: Tipra Motha Party
- Education: M.A. Philosophy
- Alma mater: North Eastern Hill University

Subodh Deb Barma (born 1 June 1971), is an Indian Tiprasa legislator who is a member of the Tripura Legislative Assembly from the Charilam Assembly constituency.

== Political career ==
Khatung joined TIPRA Motha in 2021. He contested the 2023 Tripura Legislative Assembly Election for the Charilam constituency. He defeated the sitting Deputy Chief Minister Jishnu Dev Varma by over 800 votes.
