= Agartala Sadar I Assembly constituency =

Constituency of the Tripura legislative assembly in India

Agartala Sadar I
- Former constituency for the Tripura Legislative Assembly

Constituency details
- Country: India
- Region: Northeast India
- State: Tripura
- Established: 1963
- Abolished: 1967
- Total electors: 18,374

Agartala Sadar I Assembly constituency was an assembly constituency in the Indian state of Tripura.

== Members of the Legislative Assembly ==
Election	Member	Party
1967	B. B. Das	Indian National Congress

== Election results ==
=== 1967 Assembly election ===
1967 Tripura Legislative Assembly election: Agartala Sadar I
Party	Candidate	Votes	%	±%
INC	B. B. Das	8,117	60.38%	New
CPI(M)	M. K. Roy	3,468	25.80%	New
Independent	G. R. Chowdhury	1,858	13.82%	New
Margin of victory		4,649	34.58%	
Turnout		13,443	76.68%	
Registered electors		18,374		
INC win (new seat)				
