= Kamalpur, Tripura Assembly constituency =

Legislative Assembly constituency in Tripura State, India

Coordinates: 24.2°N 91.83°E

Kamalpur
- Constituency No. 45 for the Tripura Legislative Assembly

Constituency details
- Country: India
- Region: Northeast India
- State: Tripura
- District: Dhalai
- Lok Sabha constituency: Tripura East
- Established: 1967
- Total electors: 45,932
- Reservation: None

Member of Legislative Assembly
- 13th Tripura Legislative Assembly
- Incumbent Manoj Kanti Deb
- Party: Bharatiya Janata Party

Kamalpur Legislative Assembly constituency is one of the 60 Legislative Assembly constituencies of Tripura state in India.

It is part of Dhalai district. As of 2023, it is represented by Manoj Kanti Deb of the Bharatiya Janata Party.

== Members of the Legislative Assembly ==
Election	Member	Party
1967	K. C. Das	Indian National Congress
1972	Sunil Chandra Datta	Indian National Congress
1977	Bimal Sinha	Communist Party of India
1983	Bimal Sinha	Communist Party of India
1988	Bimal Sinha	Communist Party of India
1993	Bimal Sinha	Communist Party of India
1998	Bimal Sinha	Communist Party of India
2003	Bijoy Lakshmi Singha	Communist Party of India
2008	Manoj Kanti Deb	Indian National Congress
2013	Bijoy Lakshmi Singha	Communist Party of India
2018	Manoj Kanti Deb	Bharatiya Janata Party
2023	Manoj Kanti Deb	Bharatiya Janata Party

== Election results ==
=== Assembly Election 2023 ===
2023 Tripura Legislative Assembly election: Kamalpur
Party	Candidate	Votes	%	±%
BJP	Manoj Kanti Deb	18,287	45.16%	▼6.95
INC	Rubi Ghosh	13,027	32.17%	▲31.02
TMP	Meri Debbarma	7,534	18.60%	New
AITC	Sumen Dey	612	1.51%	▲0.58
NOTA	None of the Above	534	1.32%	▲0.66
Independent	Premtosh Deb	502	1.24%	New
Margin of victory		5,260	12.99%	▲5.34
Turnout		40,496	88.27%	▼1.30
Registered electors		45,932		▲6.19
BJP hold		Swing	▼6.95	

=== Assembly Election 2018 ===
2018 Tripura Legislative Assembly election: Kamalpur
Party	Candidate	Votes	%	±%
BJP	Manoj Kanti Deb	20,165	52.11%	▲50.37
CPI(M)	Bijoy Laxmi Singha	17,206	44.46%	▼6.68
INC	Bijoy Krishna Chatterjee	443	1.14%	▼45.97
AITC	Hasen Chowdhury	360	0.93%	New
NOTA	None of the Above	256	0.66%	New
AMB	Premtosh Deb	244	0.63%	New
Margin of victory		2,959	7.65%	▲3.61
Turnout		38,696	90.68%	▼3.20
Registered electors		43,255		▲6.76
BJP gain from CPI(M)		Swing	▲0.96	

=== Assembly Election 2013 ===
2013 Tripura Legislative Assembly election: Kamalpur
Party	Candidate	Votes	%	±%
CPI(M)	Bijoy Lakshmi Singha	19,204	51.15%	▲3.50
INC	Manoj Kanti Deb	17,690	47.12%	▼1.09
BJP	Ahindra Kumar Bhattacharjee	652	1.74%	▲0.31
Margin of victory		1,514	4.03%	▲3.48
Turnout		37,546	92.72%	▼0.31
Registered electors		40,518		
CPI(M) gain from INC		Swing		

=== Assembly Election 2008 ===
2008 Tripura Legislative Assembly election: Kamalpur
Party	Candidate	Votes	%	±%
INC	Manoj Kanti Deb	11,839	48.20%	▲5.92
CPI(M)	Bijoy Lakshmi Singha	11,704	47.65%	▼7.20
BJP	Uma Kanta Debnath	350	1.43%	New
AIFB	Bir Kumar Sinha	225	0.92%	New
Independent	Sushil Malakar	222	0.90%	New
Independent	Md. Gunu Mia	221	0.90%	New
Margin of victory		135	0.55%	▼12.02
Turnout		24,561	93.19%	▲9.86
Registered electors		26,416		
INC gain from CPI(M)		Swing	▼6.65	

=== Assembly Election 2003 ===
2003 Tripura Legislative Assembly election: Kamalpur
Party	Candidate	Votes	%	±%
CPI(M)	Bijoy Lakshmi Singha	11,208	54.86%	▲3.50
INC	Manoj Kanti Deb	8,639	42.28%	▼0.57
NCP	Saroj Mia	218	1.07%	New
AITC	Basanti Sinha	210	1.03%	New
JD(U)	Krishna Kumar Singha	157	0.77%	New
Margin of victory		2,569	12.57%	▲4.07
Turnout		20,432	83.38%	▼0.39
Registered electors		24,582		▲13.91
CPI(M) hold		Swing	▲3.50	

=== Assembly by-Election 1998 ===
Tripura Legislative Assembly by-election, 1998: Kamalpur
Party	Candidate	Votes	%	±%
CPI(M)	Bijoy Lakshmi Singha	13,027	78.45%	▲27.09
INC	Sribash Chakraborty	3,323	20.02%	▼22.83
Margin of victory		9,704	58.43%	▲49.92
Turnout		16,605	76.95%	▼7.9
Registered electors		21,580		Steady
CPI(M) hold		Swing	▲27.09	

=== Assembly Election 1998 ===
1998 Tripura Legislative Assembly election: Kamalpur
Party	Candidate	Votes	%	±%
CPI(M)	Bimal Singha	9,255	51.36%	▼4.38
INC	Gouranga Chandra Ghosh	7,722	42.85%	▲3.34
BJP	Rajkishore Singha	990	5.49%	▲1.86
Margin of victory		1,533	8.51%	▼7.72
Turnout		18,021	84.85%	▼3.03
Registered electors		21,580		▲3.05
CPI(M) hold		Swing		

=== Assembly Election 1993 ===
1993 Tripura Legislative Assembly election: Kamalpur
Party	Candidate	Votes	%	±%
CPI(M)	Bimal Singha	10,100	55.74%	▲2.85
INC	Saroj Kumar Charkaborty	7,159	39.51%	▼7.06
BJP	Santipriya Debnath	658	3.63%	New
AMB	Rangala Dey	204	1.13%	New
Margin of victory		2,941	16.23%	▲9.91
Turnout		18,121	87.58%	▼2.17
Registered electors		20,941		▲22.47
CPI(M) hold		Swing	▲2.85	

=== Assembly Election 1988 ===
1988 Tripura Legislative Assembly election: Kamalpur
Party	Candidate	Votes	%	±%
CPI(M)	Bimal Singha	8,021	52.88%	▼6.60
INC	Saroj Kumar Chakraborty	7,063	46.57%	▲6.56
Margin of victory		958	6.32%	▼13.16
Turnout		15,167	89.82%	▲0.69
Registered electors		17,099		▲16.65
CPI(M) hold		Swing		

=== Assembly Election 1983 ===
1983 Tripura Legislative Assembly election: Kamalpur
Party	Candidate	Votes	%	±%
CPI(M)	Bimal Singha	7,674	59.48%	▼10.58
INC	Kanak Ranjan Ghosh	5,161	40.00%	▲29.40
Independent	Ranjit Malakar	66	0.51%	New
Margin of victory		2,513	19.48%	▼39.97
Turnout		12,901	89.17%	▲5.52
Registered electors		14,658		▲10.97
CPI(M) hold		Swing		

=== Assembly Election 1977 ===
1977 Tripura Legislative Assembly election: Kamalpur
Party	Candidate	Votes	%	±%
CPI(M)	Bimal Singha	7,634	70.06%	▲27.92
INC	Brajakishore Singha	1,156	10.61%	▼38.84
JP	Kanailal Majumdar	1,038	9.53%	New
TPCC	Paritosh Bhattacharjee	766	7.03%	New
Independent	Mohamad Ali	302	2.77%	New
Margin of victory		6,478	59.45%	▲52.14
Turnout		10,896	84.04%	▲9.25
Registered electors		13,209		▲8.18
CPI(M) gain from INC		Swing	▲20.61	

=== Assembly Election 1972 ===
1972 Tripura Legislative Assembly election: Kamalpur
Party	Candidate	Votes	%	±%
INC	Sunil Chandra Datta	4,422	49.45%	▼13.61
CPI(M)	Makhan Datta	3,768	42.14%	▲5.20
Independent	Bimal Paul	752	8.41%	New
Margin of victory		654	7.31%	▼18.82
Turnout		8,942	75.44%	▼3.20
Registered electors		12,210		▼41.96
INC hold		Swing	▼13.61	

=== Assembly Election 1967 ===
1967 Tripura Legislative Assembly election: Kamalpur
Party	Candidate	Votes	%	±%
INC	K. C. Das	10,141	63.07%	New
CPI(M)	N. K. Namadas	5,939	36.93%	New
Margin of victory		4,202	26.13%	
Turnout		16,080	79.11%	
Registered electors		21,038		
INC win (new seat)				

== See also ==
- List of constituencies of the Tripura Legislative Assembly
- Dhalai district
