= Dumburnagar Assembly constituency =

Constituency of the Tripura legislative assembly in India

Coordinates: 23.49°N 91.96°E

Dumburnagar
- Former constituency for the Tripura Legislative Assembly

Constituency details
- Country: India
- Region: Northeast India
- State: Tripura
- Established: 1963
- Abolished: 1972
- Total electors: 10,551

Dumburnagar Assembly constituency was an assembly constituency in the Indian state of Tripura.

== Members of the Legislative Assembly ==
| Election | Member | Party |
|---|---|---|
| 1967 | R. C. D. Rankhal | Indian National Congress |
| 1972 | Pakhi Tripura | Communist Party of India |

== Election results ==
=== 1972 Assembly election ===
1972 Tripura Legislative Assembly election: Dumburnagar
| Party | Candidate | Votes | % | ±% |
|---|---|---|---|---|
| CPI(M) | Pakhi Tripura | 3,272 | 60.15% | ▲16.87 |
| INC | Rajprasad Chowdhury | 1,664 | 30.59% | ▼26.13 |
| Independent | Babrubahan Chakma | 444 | 8.16% | New |
| Independent | Kamal Joy Reang | 60 | 1.10% | New |
| Margin of victory | | 1,608 | 29.56% | ▲16.12 |
| Turnout | | 5,440 | 53.60% | ▼7.00 |
| Registered electors | | 10,551 | | ▼32.88 |
| CPI(M) gain from INC | | Swing | ▲3.43 | |

=== 1967 Assembly election ===
1967 Tripura Legislative Assembly election: Dumburnagar
| Party | Candidate | Votes | % | ±% |
|---|---|---|---|---|
| INC | R. C. D. Rankhal | 5,221 | 56.72% | New |
| CPI(M) | S. D. Barma | 3,984 | 43.28% | New |
| Margin of victory | | 1,237 | 13.44% | |
| Turnout | | 9,205 | 61.50% | |
| Registered electors | | 15,720 | | |
| INC win (new seat) | | | | |
