= Longai Assembly constituency =

Constituency of the Tripura legislative assembly in India

Coordinates: 23.966°N 92.277°E

Longai
- Former constituency for the Tripura Legislative Assembly

Constituency details
- Country: India
- Region: Northeast India
- State: Tripura
- Established: 1971
- Abolished: 1976
- Total electors: 14,443

Longai was an assembly constituency in the Indian state of Tripura.

== Members of the Legislative Assembly ==
Election	Member	Party
1972	Hangshadhwaz Dewan	Indian National Congress

== Election results ==
=== 1972 Assembly election ===
1972 Tripura Legislative Assembly election: Longai
Party	Candidate	Votes	%	±%
INC	Hangshadhwaz Dewan	3,690	46.41%	New
CPI(M)	Indu Madhav Chakma	2,156	27.12%	New
AIFB	Dhani Ram Talukdhar	2,105	26.47%	New
Margin of victory		1,534	19.29%	
Turnout		7,951	57.45%	
Registered electors		14,443		
INC win (new seat)				
