= Chellagong Assembly constituency =

Constituency of the Tripura legislative assembly in India

Coordinates: 23.42°N 91.68°E

Chellagong
- Former constituency for the Tripura Legislative Assembly

Constituency details
- Country: India
- Region: Northeast India
- State: Tripura
- Established: 1971
- Abolished: 1976
- Total electors: 12,967

Chellagong Assembly constituency was an assembly constituency in the Indian state of Tripura.

== Members of the Legislative Assembly ==
Election	Member	Party
1972	Baju Ban Riyan	Communist Party of India

== Election results ==
=== 1972 Assembly election ===
1972 Tripura Legislative Assembly election: Chellagong
Party	Candidate	Votes	%	±%
CPI(M)	Baju Ban Riyan	3,032	41.25%	New
INC	Panji Ham Reang	2,989	40.67%	New
CPI	Padma Mohan Reang	1,104	15.02%	New
TUS	Goopi Devbarma	225	3.06%	New
Margin of victory		43	0.59%	
Turnout		7,350	59.33%	
Registered electors		12,967		
CPI(M) win (new seat)				
