= Old Agartala Assembly constituency =

Constituency of the Tripura legislative assembly in India

Coordinates: 23.846°N 91.344°E

Old Agartala
- Former constituency for the Tripura Legislative Assembly

Constituency details
- Country: India
- Region: Northeast India
- State: Tripura
- Established: 1963
- Abolished: 1972
- Total electors: 13,067

Old Agartala was an assembly constituency in the Indian state of Tripura.

== Members of the Legislative Assembly ==
Election	Member	Party
1967	J. K. Majumder	Indian National Congress
1972	Sailesh Chandra Some	Indian National Congress

== Election results ==
=== 1972 Assembly election ===
1972 Tripura Legislative Assembly election: Old Agartala
Party	Candidate	Votes	%	±%
INC	Sailesh Chandra Some	5,098	56.76%	▲2.17
CPI(M)	Jagadish Chandra Dey	2,217	24.69%	New
Independent	Kartik K. Bhattacharjee	1,070	11.91%	New
TUS	Chandramani Debbarma	520	5.79%	New
Independent	Bisweshar Nath	76	0.85%	New
Margin of victory		2,881	32.08%	▲22.88
Turnout		8,981	70.44%	▼9.22
Registered electors		13,067		▼35.87
INC hold		Swing	▲2.17	

=== 1967 Assembly election ===
1967 Tripura Legislative Assembly election: Old Agartala
Party	Candidate	Votes	%	±%
INC	J. K. Majumder	8,672	54.60%	New
Independent	Sailesh Chandra Some	7,211	45.40%	New
Margin of victory		1,461	9.20%	
Turnout		15,883	81.04%	
Registered electors		20,377		
INC win (new seat)				
