= Agartala Town II Assembly constituency =

Constituency of the Tripura legislative assembly in India

Agartala Town II
- Former constituency for the Tripura Legislative Assembly

Constituency details
- Country: India
- Region: Northeast India
- State: Tripura
- Established: 1971
- Abolished: 1976
- Total electors: 9,794

Agartala Town II Assembly constituency was an assembly constituency in the Indian state of Tripura.

== Members of the Legislative Assembly ==
Election	Member	Party
1972	Krishnadas Bhattacharjee	Indian National Congress

== Election results ==
=== 1972 Assembly election ===
1972 Tripura Legislative Assembly election: Agartala Town II
Party	Candidate	Votes	%	±%
INC	Krishnadas Bhattacharjee	3,009	48.01%	New
CPI(M)	Ashoke Chakraborty	2,322	37.05%	New
Independent	Niren Kumar Bhattacharyya	448	7.15%	New
AIFB	Nishith Ranjah Das	281	4.48%	New
ABJS	Jiban Kumar Bandopadhyaya	164	2.62%	New
Independent	Ganga Prasad Sharma	43	0.69%	New
Margin of victory		687	10.96%	
Turnout		6,267	65.01%	
Registered electors		9,794		
INC win (new seat)				
