= Agartala Town Assembly constituency =

Constituency of the Tripura legislative assembly in India

Coordinates: 23.847°N 91.283°E

Agartala Town
- Former constituency for the Tripura Legislative Assembly

Constituency details
- Country: India
- Region: Northeast India
- State: Tripura
- Established: 1963
- Abolished: 1967
- Total electors: 18,132

Agartala Town Assembly constituency was an assembly constituency in the Indian state of Tripura.

== Members of the Legislative Assembly ==
Election	Member	Party
1967	K. Bhattacharjee	Indian National Congress

== Election results ==
=== 1967 Assembly election ===
1967 Tripura Legislative Assembly election: Agartala Town
Party	Candidate	Votes	%	±%
INC	K. Bhattacharjee	6,853	54.26%	New
CPI	A. Islam	4,250	33.65%	New
Independent	M. K. K. P. Debi	1,119	8.86%	New
ABJS	J. K. Banoopadhaya	409	3.24%	New
Margin of victory		2,603	20.61%	
Turnout		12,631	73.11%	
Registered electors		18,132		
INC win (new seat)				
