= Uttar Debendranagar Assembly constituency =

Constituency of the Tripura legislative assembly in India

Coordinates: 23.946°N 91.367°E

Uttar Debendranagar
- Former constituency for the Tripura Legislative Assembly

Constituency details
- Country: India
- Region: Northeast India
- State: Tripura
- Established: 1963
- Abolished: 1972
- Total electors: 11,173

Uttar Debendranagar was an assembly constituency in the Indian state of Tripura.

== Members of the Legislative Assembly ==
| Election | Member | Party |
|---|---|---|
| 1967 | A. D. Barma | Communist Party of India |
| 1972 | Sabhiram Debbarma | Communist Party of India |

== Election results ==
=== 1972 Assembly election ===
1972 Tripura Legislative Assembly election: Uttar Debendranagar
| Party | Candidate | Votes | % | ±% |
|---|---|---|---|---|
| CPI(M) | Sabhiram Debbarma | 4,208 | 56.51% | ▼15.58 |
| INC | Rabindra K. Debbarma | 1,949 | 26.18% | ▼1.74 |
| CPI | Chitta Ranjan Debbarma | 1,043 | 14.01% | New |
| TUS | Faya Chandra Rupini | 246 | 3.30% | New |
| Margin of victory | | 2,259 | 30.34% | ▼13.84 |
| Turnout | | 7,446 | 69.00% | ▼6.43 |
| Registered electors | | 11,173 | | ▼44.26 |
| CPI(M) hold | | Swing | ▼15.58 | |

=== 1967 Assembly election ===
1967 Tripura Legislative Assembly election: Uttar Debendranagar
| Party | Candidate | Votes | % | ±% |
|---|---|---|---|---|
| CPI(M) | A. D. Barma | 10,559 | 72.09% | New |
| INC | B. P. D. Barma | 4,088 | 27.91% | New |
| Margin of victory | | 6,471 | 44.18% | |
| Turnout | | 14,647 | 75.32% | |
| Registered electors | | 20,045 | | |
| CPI(M) win (new seat) | | | | |
