= Kunjaban Assembly constituency =

Constituency of the Tripura legislative assembly in India

Coordinates: 23.863°N 91.290°E

Kunjaban
- Former constituency for the Tripura Legislative Assembly

Constituency details
- Country: India
- Region: Northeast India
- State: Tripura
- Established: 1971
- Abolished: 1976
- Total electors: 20,929

Kunjaban was an assembly constituency in the India state of Tripura.

== Members of the Legislative Assembly ==
Election	Member	Party
1972	Ashok Kumar Bhattacharya	Indian National Congress

== Election results ==
=== 1972 Assembly election ===
1972 Tripura Legislative Assembly election: Kunjaban
Party	Candidate	Votes	%	±%
INC	Ashok Kumar Bhattacharya	7,033	52.38%	New
CPI(M)	Kanu Ghosh	5,633	41.95%	New
Independent	Nepal Dey	761	5.67%	New
Margin of victory		1,400	10.43%	
Turnout		13,427	65.46%	
Registered electors		20,929		
INC win (new seat)				
