= Bimal Sinha =

Indian politician (1949–1998

Minister of Health, Urban Development
- In office 1995 – 31 March 1998

6th Speaker of the Tripura Legislative Assembly
- In office 14 May 1993 – 22 September 1995
- Preceded by: Jyotirmoy Nath
- Succeeded by: Jitendra Sarkar

Deputy Speaker of the Tripura Legislative Assembly
- In office 11 February 1983 – 4 February 1988
- Preceded by: Jyotirmoy Das
- Succeeded by: Rati Mohan Jamatia

Member of The Tripura Legislative Assembly
- In office 1978–1998
- Preceded by: Sunil Chandra Datta
- Succeeded by: Bijoy Lakshmi Singha

Personal details
- Born: 16 October 1949 Kamalpur, Tripura, India
- Died: 31 March 1998 (aged 48) Avanga, Ambassa-Kamalpur Road
- Party: CPI(M)
- Spouse: Bijoy Laxmi Sinha
- Cabinet: State Government of Tripura

Bimal Sinha (16 October 1949 – 31 March 1998) was an Indian Communist politician from Tripura and was a Member of the Legislative Assembly. He served as the Deputy Speaker and later as the Speaker in the 5th Tripura Legislative Assembly. He represented the Kamalpur constituency as a member of the CPI(M).

== Political career ==
Sinha started his political career as a member of the Students Federation of India in 1967. He joined the CPI(M) in 1970 and became a state committee member in 1978. Sinha became MLA for the first time after winning the 1977 Tripura Legislative Assembly election. In 1983, he elected as Deputy Speaker of Tripura Legislative Assembly and later became the Speaker of the Tripura Legislative Assembly in 1993. He was an MLA for five consecutive terms from 1978 to 1998.

== Death ==
Bikram Sinha (the adopted brother of Bimal) was kidnapped on 9 February 1998 by the National Liberation Front of Tripura, ahead of the State Assembly elections that resulted in the return to power of the Communist Party of India (Marxist). After a month at 10:00 a.m. on 31 March 1998, Bidyut Sinha (the younger brother of Bimal) informed his brother Bimal by telephone that a local leader of the Congress (I) had asked him to go to the Samthung crossing on the Dhalai River to secure the release of Bikram Sinha. Bimal Sinha and Bidyut Sinha then proceeded to Avanga, where they visited the residence of a Congress activist. The minister and his brother were informed that Bikram Sinha was waiting on the bank of the Dhalai River. They should go there without security personnel. Accordingly, Bimal Sinha instructed his bodyguards to stay behind. Bimal and his brother along with the Congress (I) activist walked towards the river bank. Sinha sensed danger and declined to move forward. About twenty militants, hiding in nearby bushes, opened fire as he turned around. The two died on the spot.
