= Sonichera Assembly constituency =

Constituency of the Tripura legislative assembly in India

Coordinates: 24.38°N 92.23°E

Sonichera
- Former constituency for the Tripura Legislative Assembly

Constituency details
- Country: India
- Region: Northeast India
- State: Tripura
- Established: 1971
- Abolished: 1976
- Total electors: 13,198

Sonichera Assembly constituency was an assembly constituency in the Indian state of Tripura.

== Members of the Legislative Assembly ==
Election	Member	Party
1972	Radha Raman Nath	Indian National Congress

== Election results ==
=== 1972 Assembly election ===
1972 Tripura Legislative Assembly election: Sonichera
Party	Candidate	Votes	%	±%
INC	Radha Raman Nath	2,637	33.61%	New
Independent	Abdul Matin Chowdhury	1,551	19.77%	New
Independent	Mukta Chand Singha	1,334	17.00%	New
CPI(M)	Purnendujit Rajkumar	1,238	15.78%	New
Independent	Mandalal Nama	345	4.40%	New
Independent	Ramani Mohan Nath	323	4.12%	New
AIFB	Anil Krishna Sarma	292	3.72%	New
Independent	Subodh Chandra Dhar	127	1.62%	New
Margin of victory		1,086	13.84%	
Turnout		7,847	61.18%	
Registered electors		13,198		
INC win (new seat)				
