= Harinath Debbarma =

Tipra-Indian politician and activist

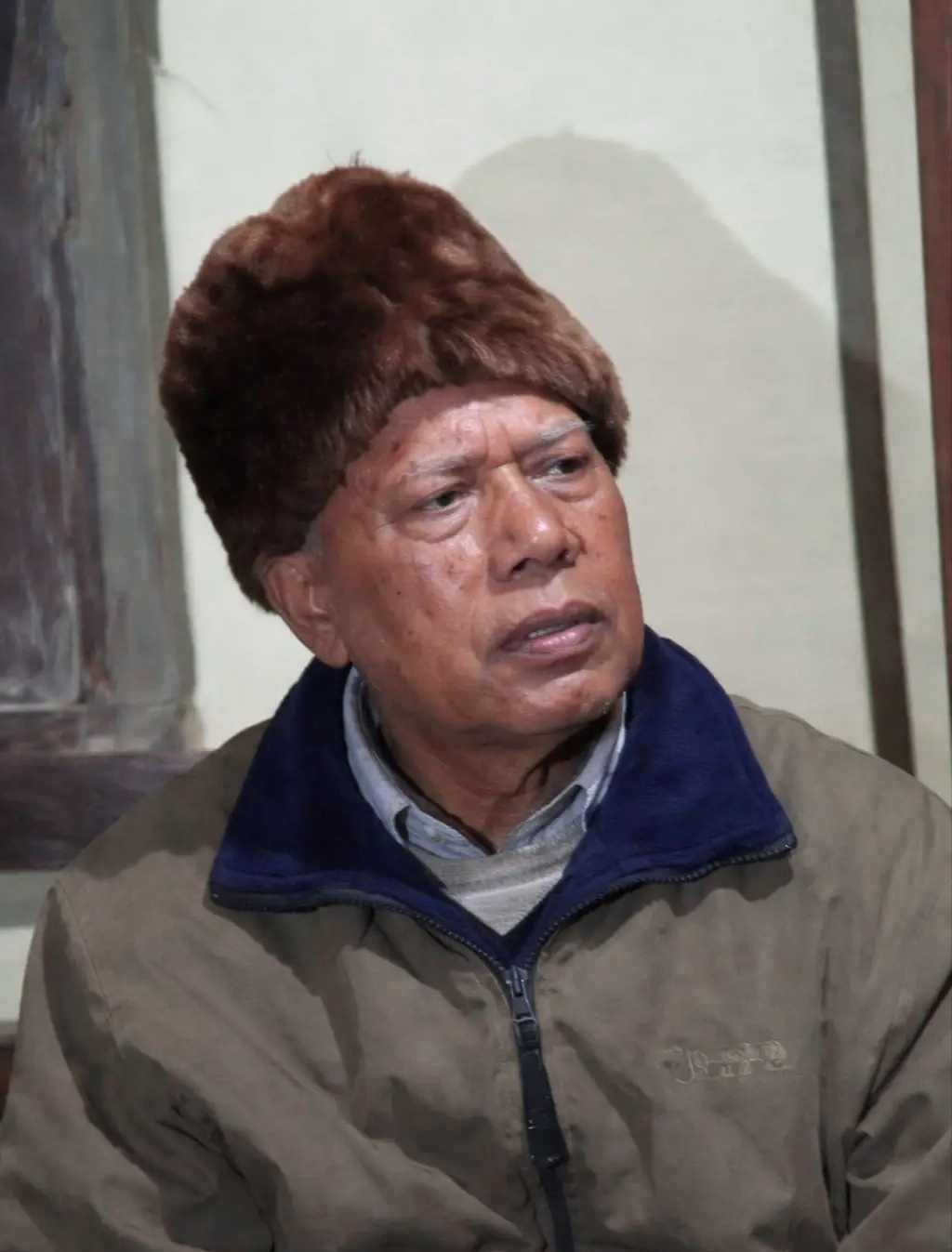
- Harinath Debbarma in 2017

Member of the Tripura Legislative Assembly
- In office 1977–1983
- Preceded by: Niranjan Deb
- Succeeded by: Parimal Chandra Saha
- Constituency: Charilam

Personal details
- Born: 30 June 1933 (age 93)
- Occupation: Politician, Activist and Statesman
- Known for: Founder of TUJS, IPFT: A Brief History of Rajmala, 2020 (in English and Bengali)

Harinath Debbarma (born 30 June 1933) is a Tipra-Indian politician, activist and statesman from Tripura. Harinath Debbarma founded the Tripura Upajati Juba Samiti (TUJS) in 1967 along with Shyama Charan Tripura. Later he founded the Indigenous People's Front of Tripura in 1997.

Harinath Debbarma was also a Member of Legislative Assembly from the Charilam constituency in Tripura and the former CEM of TTAADC (1990). In 2019, he authored a revised version of the Rajmala in Bengali and later published the translated English 'A Brief History of Rajmala' in February 2020.
