= Swaraijam Kamini Thakur Singha =

Swaraijam Kamini Thakur Singha was an Indian politician and a member of the Tripura Legislative Assembly from the Khowai Assembly constituency following the 1977 Tripura Legislative Assembly election.
