= Bishramganj Assembly constituency =

Constituency of the Tripura legislative assembly in India

Bishramganj
- Former constituency for the Tripura Legislative Assembly

Constituency details
- Country: India
- Region: Northeast India
- State: Tripura
- Established: 1971
- Abolished: 1976
- Total electors: 11,574

Bishramganj Assembly constituency was an assembly constituency in the Indian state of Tripura.

== Members of the Legislative Assembly ==
Election	Member	Party
1972	Sudhanwa Debbarma	Communist Party of India

== Election results ==
=== 1972 Assembly election ===
1972 Tripura Legislative Assembly election: Bishramganj
Party	Candidate	Votes	%	±%
CPI(M)	Sudhanwa Debbarma	2,745	35.12%	New
INC	Deuan Chandra Tripura	2,479	31.72%	New
CPI	Aghore Debbarma	1,068	13.67%	New
TUS	Nishi Kant Deb	974	12.46%	New
Independent	Anil Kishore Debbarma	549	7.02%	New
Margin of victory		266	3.40%	
Turnout		7,815	69.65%	
Registered electors		11,574		
CPI(M) win (new seat)				
