= Agartala Sadar II Assembly constituency =

Constituency of the Tripura legislative assembly in India

Agartala Sadar II
- Former constituency for the Tripura Legislative Assembly

Constituency details
- Country: India
- Region: Northeast India
- State: Tripura
- Established: 1963
- Abolished: 1967
- Total electors: 24,976

Agartala Sadar II Assembly constituency was an assembly constituency in the Indian state of Tripura.

== Members of the Legislative Assembly ==
Election	Member	Party
1967	S. Singh	Indian National Congress

== Election results ==
=== 1967 Assembly election ===
1967 Tripura Legislative Assembly election: Agartala Sadar II
Party	Candidate	Votes	%	±%
INC	S. Singh	11,445	64.42%	New
CPI(M)	S. R. Chanda	5,837	32.85%	New
Independent	M. R. R. Chowdhury	280	1.58%	New
ABJS	A. R. Paul	205	1.15%	New
Margin of victory		5,608	31.56%	
Turnout		17,767	73.96%	
Registered electors		24,976		
INC win (new seat)				
