= Bishalgarh Assembly constituency =

Legislative Assembly constituency in Tripura State, India

Coordinates: 23.69°N 91.27°E

Bishalgarh
- Constituency No. 16 for the Tripura Legislative Assembly

Constituency details
- Country: India
- Region: Northeast India
- State: Tripura
- District: Sipahijala
- Lok Sabha constituency: Tripura West
- Established: 1967
- Total electors: 49,898
- Reservation: None

Member of Legislative Assembly
- 13th Tripura Legislative Assembly
- Incumbent Sushanta Deb
- Party: Bharatiya Janata Party
- Elected year: 2023

Bishalgarh is one of the 60 Legislative Assembly constituencies of Tripura state in India. It is in Sipahijala district and is a part of West Tripura Lok Sabha constituency.

== Members of the Legislative Assembly ==
Election	Member	Party
1967	U. L. Singh	Indian National Congress
1972	Samir Ranjan Barman	Indian National Congress
1977	Gautam Prasad Dutta	Communist Party of India
1983	Bhanu Lal Saha	Communist Party of India
1988	Samir Ranjan Barman	Indian National Congress
1993	Samir Ranjan Barman	Indian National Congress
1998	Samir Ranjan Barman	Indian National Congress
2003	Samir Ranjan Barman	Indian National Congress
2008	Bhanu Lal Saha	Communist Party of India
2013	Bhanu Lal Saha	Communist Party of India
2018	Bhanu Lal Saha	Communist Party of India
2023	Sushanta Deb	Bharatiya Janata Party

== Election results ==
=== 2023 Assembly election ===
2023 Tripura Legislative Assembly election: Bishalgarh
Party	Candidate	Votes	%	±%
BJP	Sushanta Deb	22,314	48.52%	▲1.84
CPI(M)	Partha Pratim Majumder	20,988	45.64%	New
TMP	Md. Saha Alam Miah	1,606	3.49%	New
AITC	Haradhan Deb Nath	599	1.30%	New
NOTA	None of the Above	478	1.04%	▲0.35
Margin of victory		1,326	2.88%	▲1.14
Turnout		45,985	92.36%	▼3.52
Registered electors		49,898		▲8.78
BJP gain from CPI(M)		Swing	▲0.10	

=== 2018 Assembly election ===
2018 Tripura Legislative Assembly election: Bishalgarh
Party	Candidate	Votes	%	±%
CPI(M)	Bhanu Lal Saha	21,254	48.43%	▼2.59
BJP	Nitai Chowdhury	20,488	46.68%	▲45.74
INC	Jaydul Hossain	715	1.63%	▼45.20
AMB	Parimal Sarkar	339	0.77%	New
NOTA	None of the Above	301	0.69%	New
Margin of victory		766	1.75%	▼2.45
Turnout		43,889	94.04%	▲0.54
Registered electors		45,871		▲6.08
CPI(M) hold		Swing	▼2.59	

=== 2013 Assembly election ===
2013 Tripura Legislative Assembly election: Bishalgarh
Party	Candidate	Votes	%	±%
CPI(M)	Bhanu Lal Saha	20,987	51.02%	▲0.52
INC	Samir Ranjan Barman	19,263	46.83%	▼0.69
BJP	Ram Narayan Roy	386	0.94%	▼0.11
Independent	Jiban Kumar Bhowmik	313	0.76%	New
Margin of victory		1,724	4.19%	▲1.20
Turnout		41,137	95.73%	▲0.80
Registered electors		43,241		
CPI(M) hold		Swing	▲0.52	

=== 2008 Assembly election ===
2008 Tripura Legislative Assembly election: Bishalgarh
Party	Candidate	Votes	%	±%
CPI(M)	Bhanu Lal Saha	15,457	50.50%	▲5.84
INC	Samir Ranjan Barman	14,543	47.51%	▼3.73
BJP	Subrata Sarkar	320	1.05%	New
Independent	Subrata Bhowmik	289	0.94%	New
Margin of victory		914	2.99%	▼3.59
Turnout		30,609	94.52%	▲11.20
Registered electors		32,449		
CPI(M) gain from INC		Swing	▼0.74	

=== 2003 Assembly election ===
2003 Tripura Legislative Assembly election: Bishalgarh
Party	Candidate	Votes	%	±%
INC	Samir Ranjan Barman	12,414	51.24%	▼1.05
CPI(M)	Bhanu Lal Saha	10,820	44.66%	▲1.02
AITC	Matilal Saha	697	2.88%	New
Independent	Nika Debbarma	296	1.22%	New
Margin of victory		1,594	6.58%	▼2.06
Turnout		24,227	83.33%	▲2.85
Registered electors		29,142		▲12.47
INC hold		Swing	▼1.05	

=== 1998 Assembly election ===
1998 Tripura Legislative Assembly election: Bishalgarh
Party	Candidate	Votes	%	±%
INC	Samir Ranjan Barman	10,876	52.29%	▼22.54
CPI(M)	Mati Lal Sarkar	9,078	43.64%	▲22.50
BJP	Sadhan Debnath	847	4.07%	▲3.41
Margin of victory		1,798	8.64%	▼45.05
Turnout		20,801	82.03%	▼4.05
Registered electors		25,910		▼0.32
INC hold		Swing		

=== 1993 Assembly election ===
1993 Tripura Legislative Assembly election: Bishalgarh
Party	Candidate	Votes	%	±%
INC	Samir Ranjan Barman	16,404	74.83%	▲19.85
CPI(M)	Bhanu Lal Saha	4,634	21.14%	▼23.56
Independent	Subrata Mahalanabis	540	2.46%	New
BJP	Subrata Sarkar	146	0.67%	New
Margin of victory		11,770	53.69%	▲43.41
Turnout		21,922	85.25%	▼2.63
Registered electors		25,994		▲23.44
INC hold		Swing	▲19.85	

=== 1988 Assembly election ===
1988 Tripura Legislative Assembly election: Bishalgarh
Party	Candidate	Votes	%	±%
INC	Samir Ranjan Barman	10,068	54.98%	▲6.52
CPI(M)	Bhanu Lal Saha	8,186	44.70%	▼6.84
Margin of victory		1,882	10.28%	▲7.19
Turnout		18,313	87.97%	▲3.49
Registered electors		21,058		▲23.44
INC gain from CPI(M)		Swing		

=== 1983 Assembly election ===
1983 Tripura Legislative Assembly election: Bishalgarh
Party	Candidate	Votes	%	±%
CPI(M)	Bhanu Lal Saha	7,340	51.54%	▲6.08
INC	Samir Ranjan Barman	6,900	48.46%	▲47.42
Margin of victory		440	3.09%	▼12.43
Turnout		14,240	84.65%	▲2.72
Registered electors		17,059		▲16.34
CPI(M) hold		Swing		

=== 1977 Assembly election ===
1977 Tripura Legislative Assembly election: Bishalgarh
Party	Candidate	Votes	%	±%
CPI(M)	Gautam Prasad Dutta	5,384	45.47%	▲14.77
JP	Samir Ranjan Barman	3,546	29.95%	New
TPCC	Tuka Miah	2,510	21.20%	New
INC	Sudhanshu Ranjan Dhar	123	1.04%	▼31.28
Proutist Bloc, India	Sushil Kumar Das	99	0.84%	New
Independent	Ratialal Debbarma	96	0.81%	New
Margin of victory		1,838	15.52%	▲13.90
Turnout		11,841	81.89%	▲8.68
Registered electors		14,663		▲22.99
CPI(M) gain from INC		Swing	▲13.15	

=== 1972 Assembly election ===
1972 Tripura Legislative Assembly election: Bishalgarh
Party	Candidate	Votes	%	±%
INC	Samir Ranjan Barman	2,777	32.32%	▼23.28
CPI(M)	Babul Sengupta	2,638	30.70%	New
Independent	Tuku Mian	1,515	17.63%	New
Independent	Pran Ballov Bhowmik	885	10.30%	New
Independent	Kamini Kumar Saha	520	6.05%	New
Independent	Nilendra Chowdhury	173	2.01%	New
Independent	Shrish Chowdhury	85	0.99%	New
Margin of victory		139	1.62%	▼11.72
Turnout		8,593	73.54%	▲1.73
Registered electors		11,922		▼42.24
INC hold		Swing	▼23.28	

=== 1967 Assembly election ===
1967 Tripura Legislative Assembly election: Bishalgarh
Party	Candidate	Votes	%	±%
INC	U. L. Singh	8,072	55.59%	New
Independent	B. M. Saha	6,136	42.26%	New
ABJS	A. K. Deb	174	1.20%	New
SSP	L. Goswami	83	0.57%	New
Margin of victory		1,936	13.33%	
Turnout		14,520	74.02%	
Registered electors		20,640		
INC win (new seat)				

== See also ==
- List of constituencies of the Tripura Legislative Assembly
- Sipahijala district
- Bishalgarh
- Tripura West (Lok Sabha constituency)
