= Sonamura South Assembly constituency =

Constituency of the Tripura legislative assembly in India

Sonamura South
- Former constituency for the Tripura Legislative Assembly

Constituency details
- Country: India
- Region: Northeast India
- State: Tripura
- Established: 1963
- Abolished: 1967
- Total electors: 14,924

Sonamura South Assembly constituency was an assembly constituency in the Indian state of Tripura.

== Members of the Legislative Assembly ==
Election	Member	Party
1967	B. Ali	Indian National Congress

== Election results ==
=== 1967 Assembly election ===
1967 Tripura Legislative Assembly election: Sonamura South
Party	Candidate	Votes	%	±%
INC	B. Ali	7,888	65.58%	New
Independent	B. R. Pal	4,140	34.42%	New
Margin of victory		3,748	31.16%	
Turnout		12,028	83.28%	
Registered electors		14,924		
INC win (new seat)				
