= Agartala Sadar III Assembly constituency =

Constituency of the Tripura legislative assembly in India

Agartala Sadar III
- Former constituency for the Tripura Legislative Assembly

Constituency details
- Country: India
- Region: Northeast India
- State: Tripura
- Established: 1963
- Abolished: 1967
- Total electors: 21,446

Agartala Sadar III Assembly constituency was an assembly constituency in the Indian state of Tripura.

== Members of the Legislative Assembly ==
Election	Member	Party
1967	T. M. D. Gupta	Indian National Congress

== Election results ==
=== 1967 Assembly election ===
1967 Tripura Legislative Assembly election: Agartala Sadar III
Party	Candidate	Votes	%	±%
INC	T. M. D. Gupta	8,872	57.18%	New
Independent	S. S. Gupta	5,283	34.05%	New
Independent	D. Dey	1,215	7.83%	New
Independent	S. R. Roy	146	0.94%	New
Margin of victory		3,589	23.13%	
Turnout		15,516	75.57%	
Registered electors		21,446		
INC win (new seat)				
