= Sridam Pal =

Indian politician

Sridam Pal (died 12 October 1988) was an Indian politician. As of 1988 he was a member of the Tripura Tribal Areas Autonomous District Council, representing the Communist Party of India (Marxist).

Sridam Pal was killed at an attack on 12 October 1988 by Indian National Congress workers in Birchandra Manu, whilst inaugurating a CPI(M) party office there.
