= Ishanchandranagar Assembly constituency =

Constituency of the Tripura legislative assembly in India

Coordinates: 23.78°N 91.24°E

Ishanchandranagar
- Former constituency for the Tripura Legislative Assembly

Constituency details
- Country: India
- Region: Northeast India
- State: Tripura
- Established: 1971
- Abolished: 1976
- Total electors: 10,682

Ishanchandranagar was an assembly constituency in the Indian state of Tripura.

== Members of the Legislative Assembly ==
Election	Member	Party
1972	Naresh Chandra Roy	Indian National Congress

== Election results ==
=== 1972 Assembly election ===
1972 Tripura Legislative Assembly election: Ishanchandranagar
Party	Candidate	Votes	%	±%
INC	Naresh Chandra Roy	3,349	46.62%	New
CPI(M)	Mati Lal Sarkar	3,328	46.33%	New
Independent	Dhirendra Kumar Sarkar	406	5.65%	New
ABJS	Labani Mohan Paul	100	1.39%	New
Margin of victory		21	0.29%	
Turnout		7,183	69.56%	
Registered electors		10,682		
INC win (new seat)				
