= Mohar Chhera Assembly constituency =

Constituency of the Tripura legislative assembly in India

Coordinates: 23.874°N 91.625°E

Mohar Chhera
- Former constituency for the Tripura Legislative Assembly

Constituency details
- Country: India
- Region: Northeast India
- State: Tripura
- Established: 1971
- Abolished: 1976
- Total electors: 14,727

Mohar Chhera was an assembly constituency in the Indian state of Tripura.

== Members of the Legislative Assembly ==
Election	Member	Party
1972	Ananta Hari Jamatia	Indian National Congress

== Election results ==
=== 1972 Assembly election ===
1972 Tripura Legislative Assembly election: Mohar Chhera
Party	Candidate	Votes	%	±%
INC	Ananta Hari Jamatia	5,351	51.36%	New
CPI(M)	Joy Mohan Debbarma	3,691	35.43%	New
Independent	Bhrigumani Jamatia	1,377	13.22%	New
Margin of victory		1,660	15.93%	
Turnout		10,419	72.83%	
Registered electors		14,727		
INC win (new seat)				
