= Arun Kumar Kar =

Indian academic and politician (c.1939–2020)

Tripura Legislative Assembly
- In office 1988–1993
- Preceded by: Samir Deb Sarkar
- Succeeded by: Samir Deb Sarkar
- Constituency: Khowai

Personal details
- Born: c. 1939
- Died: 16 February 2020 (aged 81); Kolkata, West Bengal, India
- Political party: Indian National Congress

Arun Kumar Kar (c. 1939 – 16 February 2020) was an Indian academic and politician from Tripura belonging to Indian National Congress. He was a legislator of the Tripura Legislative Assembly. He also served as a minister of the Government of Tripura.

== Biography ==
Kar joined Shri Nath Bidyaniketan in 1962. He was appointed the headmaster of the institution in 1981. He retired from there in 1998.

Kar contested from Khowai in 1977 but did not win. He was elected as a member of the Tripura Legislative Assembly from that constituency in 1988. Later, he was appointed a minister of the Government of Tripura. He also contested from Khowai in 1998, 2003 and 2008 but did not win.

Kar died of cardiac arrest on 16 February 2020 at a private hospital in Kolkata at the age of 81.
