= Dharmanagar North Assembly constituency =

Constituency of the Tripura legislative assembly in India

Dharmanagar North
- Former constituency for the Tripura Legislative Assembly

Constituency details
- Country: India
- Region: Northeast India
- State: Tripura
- Established: 1963
- Abolished: 1967
- Total electors: 17,343

Dharmanagar North Assembly constituency was an assembly constituency in the Indian state of Tripura.

== Members of the Legislative Assembly ==
Election	Member	Party
1967	B. B. Banerjee	Indian National Congress

== Election results ==
=== 1967 Assembly election ===
1967 Tripura Legislative Assembly election: Dharmanagar North
Party	Candidate	Votes	%	±%
INC	B. B. Banerjee	6,467	52.59%	New
CPI(M)	D. Chakraborty	3,437	27.95%	New
Independent	F. Ahammed	2,252	18.31%	New
Independent	B. C. Ghose	142	1.15%	New
Margin of victory		3,030	24.64%	
Turnout		12,298	73.85%	
Registered electors		17,343		
INC win (new seat)				
