= Jolaibari Assembly constituency =

Legislative Assembly constituency in Tripura State, India

Coordinates: 23.22°N 91.61°E

Jolaibari
- Constituency No. 38 for the Tripura Legislative Assembly

Constituency details
- Country: India
- Region: Northeast India
- State: Tripura
- District: South Tripura
- Lok Sabha constituency: Tripura East
- Established: 1977
- Total electors: 49,025
- Reservation: ST

Member of Legislative Assembly
- 13th Tripura Legislative Assembly
- Incumbent Sukla Charan Noatia
- Party: IPFT
- Alliance: NDA
- Elected year: 2023

Jolaibari is one of the 60 Legislative Assembly constituencies of Tripura state in India. It is in South Tripura district and is reserved for candidates belonging to the Scheduled Tribes. It is also part of Tripura East (Lok Sabha constituency).

== Members of the Legislative Assembly ==
Election	Member	Party
1977	Brajamohan Jamatia	Communist Party of India
1983	Kashi Ram Reang	Indian National Congress
1988	Brajamohan Jamatia	Communist Party of India
1993	Brajendra Mog Chowdhury	Indian National Congress
1998	Gitamohan Tripura	Communist Party of India
2003	Jashabir Tripura	Communist Party of India
2008	Jashabir Tripura	Communist Party of India
2013	Jashabir Tripura	Communist Party of India
2018	Jashabir Tripura	Communist Party of India
2023	Sukla Charan Noatia	Indigenous People's Front of Tripura

== Election results ==
=== 2023 Assembly election ===
2023 Tripura Legislative Assembly election: Jolaibari
Party	Candidate	Votes	%	±%
IPFT	Sukla Charan Noatia	17,621	38.54	New
CPI(M)	Debendra Tripura	17,246	37.72	▼11.87
TMP	Gaurab Mog Chowdhury	8,833	19.32	New
AITC	Kangjari Mog	1,131	2.47	▲1.45
NOTA	None of the Above	888	1.94	▲0.82
Margin of victory		375	0.82	▼2.85
Turnout		45,719	93.36	▼1.68
Registered electors		49,025		▲9.08
IPFT gain from CPI(M)		Swing	▼11.05	

=== 2018 Assembly election ===
2018 Tripura Legislative Assembly election: Jolaibari
Party	Candidate	Votes	%	±%
CPI(M)	Jashabir Tripura	21,160	49.59%	▼12.31
BJP	Ankya Mog Chowdhury	19,592	45.92%	New
NOTA	None of the Above	479	1.12%	New
AITC	Madhu Sudan Tripura	435	1.02%	New
INC	Brajamohan Tripura	349	0.82%	▼37.28
Independent	Kalyan Reang	330	0.77%	New
Margin of victory		1,568	3.67%	▼20.13
Turnout		42,667	94.32%	▼0.27
Registered electors		44,945		▲9.02
CPI(M) hold		Swing	▼12.31	

=== 2013 Assembly election ===
2013 Tripura Legislative Assembly election: Jolaibari
Party	Candidate	Votes	%	±%
CPI(M)	Jashabir Tripura	24,295	61.90%	▲2.47
INC	Brajendra Mog Chowdhury	14,952	38.10%	▲2.27
Margin of victory		9,343	23.81%	▲0.19
Turnout		39,247	95.31%	▲2.31
Registered electors		41,227		
CPI(M) hold		Swing		

=== 2008 Assembly election ===
2008 Tripura Legislative Assembly election: Jolaibari
Party	Candidate	Votes	%	±%
CPI(M)	Jashabir Tripura	13,864	59.44%	▼0.08
INC	Brajendra Mog Chowdhury	8,356	35.82%	New
Independent	Purna Chandra Tripura	473	2.03%	New
AITC	Madhu Sudan Tripura	396	1.70%	New
Independent	Kejari Mog Chowdhury	237	1.02%	New
Margin of victory		5,508	23.61%	▼0.06
Turnout		23,326	93.49%	▲11.78
Registered electors		25,111		
CPI(M) hold		Swing	▼0.08	

=== 2003 Assembly election ===
2003 Tripura Legislative Assembly election: Jolaibari
Party	Candidate	Votes	%	±%
CPI(M)	Jashabir Tripura	11,324	59.52%	▼4.85
INPT	Mever Kumar Jamatia	6,820	35.85%	New
LJP	Labre Mog	488	2.56%	New
BJP	Parikshit Debbarma	394	2.07%	▼2.96
Margin of victory		4,504	23.67%	▼10.09
Turnout		19,026	81.21%	▼1.62
Registered electors		23,457		▲8.11
CPI(M) hold		Swing	▼4.85	

=== 1998 Assembly election ===
1998 Tripura Legislative Assembly election: Jolaibari
Party	Candidate	Votes	%	±%
CPI(M)	Gitamohan Tripura	11,554	64.36%	▲18.15
INC	Brajendra Mog Chowdhury	5,494	30.61%	▼21.29
BJP	Chaisafru Chowdhury	903	5.03%	New
Margin of victory		6,060	33.76%	▲28.07
Turnout		17,951	84.43%	▲1.57
Registered electors		21,698		▼2.62
CPI(M) gain from INC		Swing		

=== 1993 Assembly election ===
1993 Tripura Legislative Assembly election: Jolaibari
Party	Candidate	Votes	%	±%
INC	Brajendra Mog Chowdhury	9,385	51.90%	▲2.89
CPI(M)	Gitamohan Tripura	8,357	46.21%	▼3.54
Independent	Mantulal Tripura	222	1.23%	New
AMB	Chandramani Debbarma	120	0.66%	New
Margin of victory		1,028	5.68%	▲4.93
Turnout		18,084	82.45%	▼4.90
Registered electors		22,282		▲22.31
INC gain from CPI(M)		Swing	▲2.14	

=== 1988 Assembly election ===
1988 Tripura Legislative Assembly election: Jolaibari
Party	Candidate	Votes	%	±%
CPI(M)	Brajamohan Jamatia	7,800	49.75%	▲1.65
INC	Brajamohan Tripura	7,682	49.00%	▼2.89
Independent	Brajendra Chandra Sarkar	98	0.63%	New
Independent	Lanchangfru Mog.	97	0.62%	New
Margin of victory		118	0.75%	▼3.04
Turnout		15,677	87.08%	▲4.00
Registered electors		18,217		▲15.47
CPI(M) gain from INC		Swing	▼2.14	

=== 1983 Assembly election ===
1983 Tripura Legislative Assembly election: Jolaibari
Party	Candidate	Votes	%	±%
INC	Kashi Ram Reang	6,718	51.90%	▲20.72
CPI(M)	Brajamohan Jamatia	6,227	48.10%	▲11.53
Margin of victory		491	3.79%	▼1.61
Turnout		12,945	83.61%	▲7.00
Registered electors		15,776		▲20.20
INC gain from CPI(M)		Swing		

=== 1977 Assembly election ===
1977 Tripura Legislative Assembly election: Jolaibari
Party	Candidate	Votes	%	±%
CPI(M)	Brajamohan Jamatia	3,603	36.57%	New
INC	Kashi Ram Reang	3,071	31.17%	New
JP	Achaichhi Mog	1,335	13.55%	New
TUS	Kyajasai Mog	1,165	11.83%	New
CPI	Hlura Aung Mog	418	4.24%	New
TPCC	Afrucni Mog Chowdhury	259	2.63%	New
Margin of victory		532	5.40%	
Turnout		9,851	76.69%	
Registered electors		13,125		
CPI(M) win (new seat)				

== See also ==
- List of constituencies of the Tripura Legislative Assembly
- South Tripura district
- Manu Assembly constituency
- Tripura East Lok Sabha constituency
