= Achaichhi Mog =

Achaichhi Mog (1931-1981) was an Indian politician. He was born on October 15, 1931 in the village of Jolaibari. After finishing his schooling in Jolaibari, he went into agriculture. He became politically active in the Indian National Congress, and became a Block Development Committee member.

Standing as the Congress candidate, he won the Muhuripur seat in the 1972 Tripura Legislative Assembly election - obtaining 4,394 votes (55.93%). He ran as a Janata Party candidate in the Jolaibari seat in the 1977 Tripura Legislative Assembly election, finishing in third place with 1,335 votes (13.55%).

Mog died at his residence from heart disease on December 10, 1981.
