= Dharmanagar South Assembly constituency =

Constituency of the Tripura legislative assembly in India

Dharmanagar South
- Former constituency for the Tripura Legislative Assembly

Constituency details
- Country: India
- Region: Northeast India
- State: Tripura
- Established: 1963
- Abolished: 1967
- Total electors: 18,006

Dharmanagar South Assembly constituency was an assembly constituency in the Indian state of Tripura.

== Members of the Legislative Assembly ==
Election	Member	Party
1967	M. Nath	Indian National Congress

== Election results ==
=== 1967 Assembly election ===
1967 Tripura Legislative Assembly election: Dharmanagar South
Party	Candidate	Votes	%	±%
INC	M. Nath	8,354	64.12%	New
CPI(M)	R. K. Nath	4,674	35.88%	New
Margin of victory		3,680	28.25%	
Turnout		13,028	74.81%	
Registered electors		18,006		
INC win (new seat)				
