= Agartala Town I Assembly constituency =

Constituency of the Tripura legislative assembly in India

Agartala Town I
- Former constituency for the Tripura Legislative Assembly

Constituency details
- Country: India
- Region: Northeast India
- State: Tripura
- Established: 1971
- Abolished: 1976
- Total electors: 11,963

Agartala Town I Assembly constituency was an assembly constituency in the Indian state of Tripura.

== Members of the Legislative Assembly ==
Election	Member	Party
1972	Ajoy Biswas	Independent politician

== Election results ==
=== 1972 Assembly election ===
1972 Tripura Legislative Assembly election: Agartala Town I
Party	Candidate	Votes	%	±%
Independent	Ajoy Biswas	3,810	50.28%	New
INC	Renuka Chakraborty	2,742	36.19%	New
CPI	Saroj Ranjan Chanda	819	10.81%	New
Independent	Anukul Chandra Saha	86	1.14%	New
ABJS	Parimalendu Bhattacharjee	81	1.07%	New
Independent	Rajani Kanta Chakraborty	39	0.51%	New
Margin of victory		1,068	14.10%	
Turnout		7,577	64.27%	
Registered electors		11,963		
Independent win (new seat)				
