= Kulaihower Assembly constituency =

Constituency of the Tripura legislative assembly in India

Coordinates: 23.95°N 91.83°E

Kulaihower
- Former constituency for the Tripura Legislative Assembly

Constituency details
- Country: India
- Region: Northeast India
- State: Tripura
- Established: 1963
- Abolished: 1972
- Total electors: 17,645

Kulaihower was an assembly constituency in the Indian state of Tripura.

== Members of the Legislative Assembly ==
Election	Member	Party
1967	G. Dewan	Indian National Congress
1972	Mongchabai Mog	Indian National Congress

== Election results ==
=== 1972 Assembly election ===
1972 Tripura Legislative Assembly election: Kulaihower
Party	Candidate	Votes	%	±%
INC	Mongchabai Mog	6,380	55.81%	▼1.24
CPI(M)	Dinesh Debbarma	4,662	40.78%	▼2.17
TUS	Ashadhan Kalai	390	3.41%	New
Margin of victory		1,718	15.03%	▲0.93
Turnout		11,432	67.21%	▲8.33
Registered electors		17,645		▼32.39
INC hold		Swing	▼1.24	

=== 1967 Assembly election ===
1967 Tripura Legislative Assembly election: Kulaihower
Party	Candidate	Votes	%	±%
INC	G. Dewan	8,406	57.05%	New
CPI(M)	D. D. Barma	6,329	42.95%	New
Margin of victory		2,077	14.10%	
Turnout		14,735	58.90%	
Registered electors		26,097		
INC win (new seat)				
