= S. C. Datta =

Indian politician

S . C . Datta was an Indian politician and a member of the Tripura Legislative Assembly from Khowai Assembly constituency in 1967 election.
