= Samir Deb Sarkar =

Indian politician

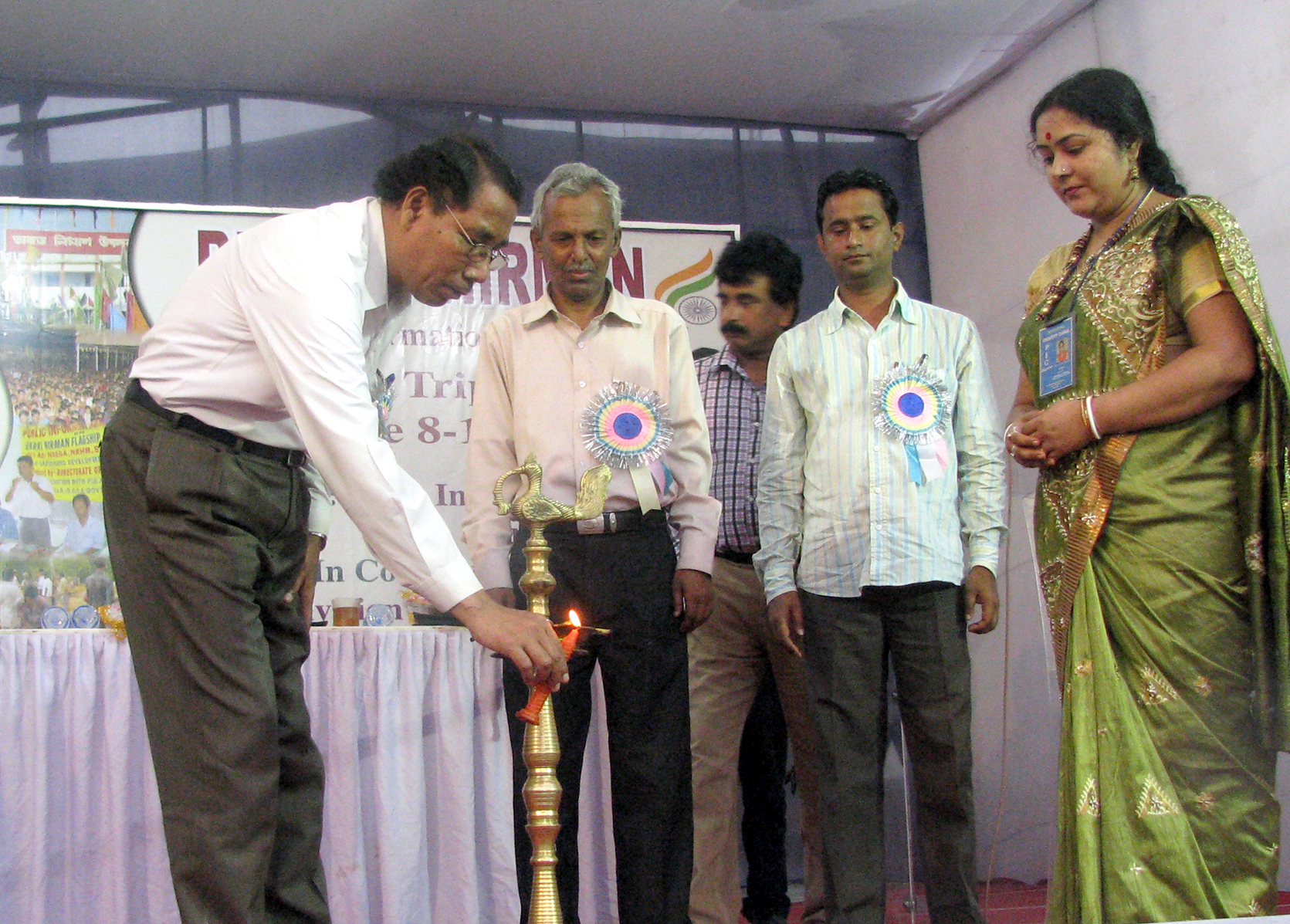

Member of the U.S. House of Representatives from 's Khowai district

Personal details
- Party: CPI(M)
- Education: Graduate
- Alma mater: Calcutta University
- Profession: Social Activist

Samir Deb Sarkar was an Indian politician and a member of the Tripura Legislative Assembly from the Khowai Assembly constituency.

== See also ==
- Dasarath Deb
- Arun Kumar Kar
