= Khowai Assembly constituency =

Constituency of the Tripura legislative assembly in India

Coordinates: 24.07°N 91.61°E

Khowai
- Constituency No. 25 for the Tripura Legislative Assembly

Constituency details
- Country: India
- Region: Northeast India
- State: Tripura
- District: Khowai
- Lok Sabha constituency: Tripura East
- Established: 1967
- Total electors: 42,949
- Reservation: None

Member of Legislative Assembly
- 13th Tripura Legislative Assembly
- Incumbent Nirmal Biswas
- Party: Communist Party of India (Marxist)
- Elected year: 2023

Khowai is one of the 60 Legislative Assembly constituencies of Tripura state in India. It is in Khowai district and is a part of East Tripura Lok Sabha constituency.

== Members of the Legislative Assembly ==
Election	Member	Party
1967	S. C. Datta	Indian National Congress
1972	Jadu Prasanna Bhattacharjee	Indian National Congress
1977	Swaraijam Kamini Thakur Singha	Communist Party of India
1983	Samir Deb Sarkar	Communist Party of India
1988	Arun Kumar Kar	Indian National Congress
1993	Samir Deb Sarkar	Communist Party of India
1998	Samir Deb Sarkar	Communist Party of India
2003	Samir Deb Sarkar	Communist Party of India
2008	Samir Deb Sarkar	Communist Party of India
2013	Samir Deb Sarkar	Communist Party of India
2018	Nirmal Biswas	Communist Party of India
2023	Nirmal Biswas	Communist Party of India

== Election results ==
=== 2023 Assembly election ===
2023 Tripura Legislative Assembly election: Khowai
Party	Candidate	Votes	%	±%
CPI(M)	Nirmal Biswas	19,696	49.73%	▼1.85
BJP	Subrata Majumdar	18,656	47.10%	▲2.37
Independent	Kishore Roy	670	1.69%	New
NOTA	None of the Above	587	1.48%	▲1.11
Margin of victory		1,040	2.63%	▼4.21
Turnout		39,609	93.92%	▼5.20
Registered electors		42,949		▲4.60
CPI(M) hold		Swing	▼1.85	

=== 2018 Assembly election ===
2018 Tripura Legislative Assembly election: Khowai
Party	Candidate	Votes	%	±%
CPI(M)	Nirmal Biswas	20,629	51.57%	▼9.25
BJP	Amit Rakshit	17,893	44.73%	▲44.11
AMB	Goutam Deb	330	0.83%	▼0.01
INC	Ajoy Chandra Das	209	0.52%	▼36.62
NOTA	None of the Above	149	0.37%	New
Margin of victory		2,736	6.84%	▼16.84
Turnout		39,999	95.55%	▲1.41
Registered electors		41,059		▲5.66
CPI(M) hold		Swing	▼9.25	

=== 2013 Assembly election ===
2013 Tripura Legislative Assembly election: Khowai
Party	Candidate	Votes	%	±%
CPI(M)	Samir Deb Sarkar	22,692	60.82%	▲6.50
INC	Dipak Majumder	13,859	37.15%	▼5.45
AMB	Rupesh Kumar Deb	310	0.83%	▼0.26
BJP	Pramod Ranjan Das	232	0.62%	▼0.23
Independent	Uttam Kumar Ghosh	216	0.58%	New
Margin of victory		8,833	23.68%	▲11.94
Turnout		37,309	96.17%	▲0.20
Registered electors		38,860		
CPI(M) hold		Swing	▲6.50	

=== 2008 Assembly election ===
2008 Tripura Legislative Assembly election: Khowai
Party	Candidate	Votes	%	±%
CPI(M)	Samir Deb Sarkar	15,385	54.33%	▼1.45
INC	Arun Kumar Kar	12,062	42.59%	▲0.96
AMB	Sailen Roy	310	1.09%	New
BJP	Dhananjoy Debnath	241	0.85%	▼0.82
Independent	Gayatri Debnath	167	0.59%	New
Independent	Adhir Sarkar	155	0.55%	New
Margin of victory		3,323	11.73%	▼2.41
Turnout		28,320	95.86%	▲10.25
Registered electors		29,560		
CPI(M) hold		Swing	▼1.45	

=== 2003 Assembly election ===
2003 Tripura Legislative Assembly election: Khowai
Party	Candidate	Votes	%	±%
CPI(M)	Samir Deb Sarkar	13,511	55.78%	▲6.18
INC	Arun Kumar Kar	10,084	41.63%	▼4.96
BJP	Dhananjoy Debnath	404	1.67%	▼1.03
Independent	Prabesh Debbarma	224	0.92%	New
Margin of victory		3,427	14.15%	▲11.14
Turnout		24,223	85.70%	▲0.70
Registered electors		28,314		▲14.39
CPI(M) hold		Swing	▲6.18	

=== 1998 Assembly election ===
1998 Tripura Legislative Assembly election: Khowai
Party	Candidate	Votes	%	±%
CPI(M)	Samir Deb Sarkar	10,416	49.59%	▼0.38
INC	Arun Kumar Kar	9,785	46.59%	▼0.29
BJP	Krishnadhan Paul	566	2.69%	New
AMB	Sailen Roy	206	0.98%	▼1.53
Margin of victory		631	3.00%	▼0.09
Turnout		21,003	85.82%	▼2.71
Registered electors		24,753		▲13.07
CPI(M) hold		Swing	▼0.38	

=== 1993 Assembly election ===
1993 Tripura Legislative Assembly election: Khowai
Party	Candidate	Votes	%	±%
CPI(M)	Samir Deb Sarkar	9,579	49.97%	▲1.04
INC	Sukhamoy Kar	8,986	46.88%	▼2.79
AMB	Deba Brata Datta	482	2.51%	New
Margin of victory		593	3.09%	▲2.36
Turnout		19,168	88.54%	▼1.29
Registered electors		21,892		▲26.16
CPI(M) gain from INC		Swing		

=== 1988 Assembly election ===
1988 Tripura Legislative Assembly election: Khowai
Party	Candidate	Votes	%	±%
INC	Arun Kumar Kar	7,657	49.67%	▲21.62
CPI(M)	Samir Deb Sarkar	7,544	48.93%	▲3.76
Independent	Monomohan Datta	216	1.40%	New
Margin of victory		113	0.73%	▼16.39
Turnout		15,417	89.70%	▲1.78
Registered electors		17,352		▲18.15
INC gain from CPI(M)		Swing		

=== 1983 Assembly election ===
1983 Tripura Legislative Assembly election: Khowai
Party	Candidate	Votes	%	±%
CPI(M)	Samir Deb Sarkar	5,777	45.18%	▼6.08
INC	Sukhamoy Kar	3,587	28.05%	▲19.44
Independent	Ratan Ghosh	3,424	26.78%	New
Margin of victory		2,190	17.13%	▼5.29
Turnout		12,788	88.15%	▲3.62
Registered electors		14,687		▲9.91
CPI(M) hold		Swing		

=== 1977 Assembly election ===
1977 Tripura Legislative Assembly election: Khowai
Party	Candidate	Votes	%	±%
CPI(M)	Swaraijam Kamini Thakur Singha	5,715	51.25%	▲16.10
TPCC	Arun Kar	3,215	28.83%	New
JP	Jadu Prasanna Bhattacharjee	985	8.83%	New
INC	Sukhamoy Kar	960	8.61%	▼47.74
Independent	Amrit Lal Gour	209	1.87%	New
Independent	Sunil Hrishi Das	67	0.60%	New
Margin of victory		2,500	22.42%	▲1.22
Turnout		11,151	84.66%	▲8.61
Registered electors		13,363		▲11.17
CPI(M) gain from INC		Swing	▼5.10	

=== 1972 Assembly election ===
1972 Tripura Legislative Assembly election: Khowai
Party	Candidate	Votes	%	±%
INC	J Prasanna Bhattacharjee	5,069	56.35%	▼4.71
CPI(M)	Kaminisingh	3,162	35.15%	New
Independent	Kali Kishore Chakraborty	465	5.17%	New
Independent	Satyendra Biswas	299	3.32%	New
Margin of victory		1,907	21.20%	▼2.82
Turnout		8,995	76.52%	▼7.58
Registered electors		12,020		▼44.83
INC hold		Swing	▼4.71	

=== 1967 Assembly election ===
1967 Tripura Legislative Assembly election: Khowai
Party	Candidate	Votes	%	±%
INC	S. C. Datta	10,964	61.06%	New
Independent	J. Bhattacharjee	6,650	37.03%	New
Independent	N. C. D. Barma	257	1.43%	New
Margin of victory		4,314	24.03%	
Turnout		17,956	85.14%	
Registered electors		21,788		
INC win (new seat)				

== See also ==
- List of constituencies of the Tripura Legislative Assembly
- Khowai district
- Khowai
- Tripura East (Lok Sabha constituency)
- 2023 Tripura Legislative Assembly election
