= 1972 Tripura Legislative Assembly election =

Indian state election

- 11 March 1972

60 seats in the Assembly 31 seats needed for a majority

	First party	Second party
Leader	Sukhamoy Sen Gupta	-
Party	INC(R)	CPI(M)
Leader's seat	Agartala Town III	-
Last election	27/30	2/30
Seats won	41	16
Seat change	-	-
Popular vote	224,821	189,667
Percentage	44.83%	37.82%
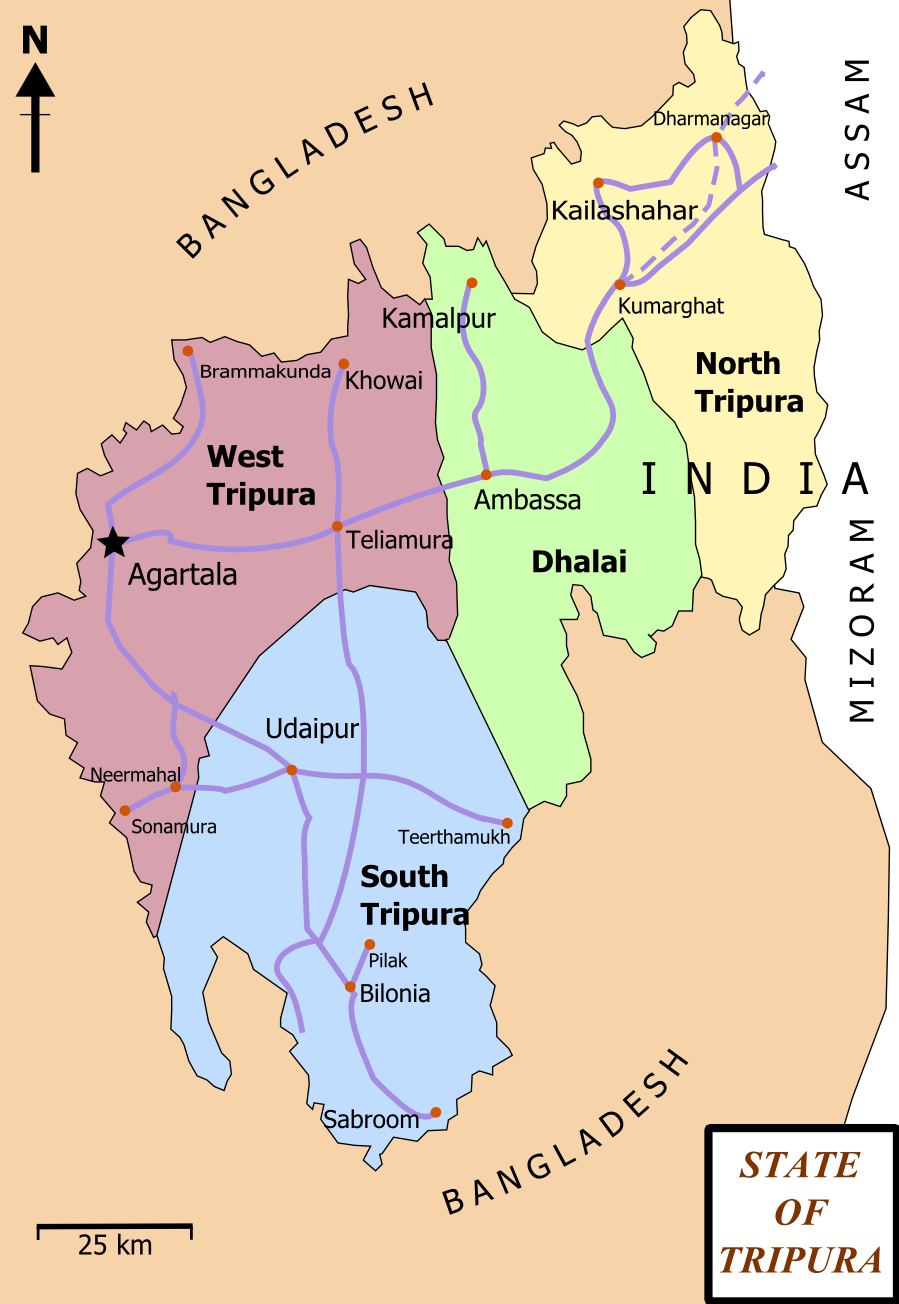
- Tripura District Map
CM before election
President's rule
Elected CM
Sukhamoy Sen Gupta
INC

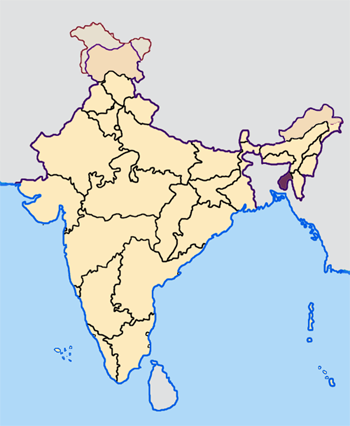
Tripura

Tripura was recognized as a state in India on January 21, 1972. Before that, Tripura was a Union Territory. The first Legislative Assembly Election as a state was held on March 11, 1972. The 1972 Tripura Legislative Assembly election took place in a single phase to elect the Members of the Legislative Assembly (MLA) from each of the 60 Assembly Constituencies (ACs) in Tripura, India.

Indian National Congress led by Sukhamoy Sen Gupta, won 41 seats and formed a Government in Tripura.

== Highlights ==
Election to the Tripura Legislative Assembly were held on March 11, 1972. The election were held in a single phase for all the 60 assembly constituencies.

=== Participating political parties ===
#	Type	Abbreviation	Party
1	National Party	BJS	Bharatiya Jan Sangh
2	National Party	CPI	Communist Party of India
3	National Party	CPM	Communist Party of India (Marxist)
4	National Party	INC	Indian National Congress
5	State Party	FBL	All India Forward Bloc
6	Registered (Unrecognised) Party	TUS	Tripura Upajati Zuba Samiti
7	Independents	IND	Independent

=== No. of constituencies ===
Type of Constituencies	GEN	SC	ST	Total
No. of Constituencies	36	5	19	60

=== Electors ===
	Men	Women	Total
No.of Electors	406,712	359,381	766,093
No.of Electors who Voted	284,765	231,288	516,053
Polling Percentage	70.02%	64.36%	67.36%

=== Performance of women candidates ===
	Men	Women	Total
No.of Contestants	230	04	328
Elected	60	00	60

== Result ==
=== Results by party ===
Party	Seats contested	Seats won	No. of votes	% of votes	1967 Seats
Indian National Congress	59	41	224,821	44.83%	27
Communist Party of India (Marxist)	57	16	189,667	37.82%	2
Communist Party of India	11	1	15,226	3.04%	1
Tripura Upajati Juba Samiti	10	0	5,883	1.17%	-
All India Forward Bloc	9	0	5,739	1.14%	-
Bharatiya Jana Sangh	3	0	345	0.07%	0
Independents	85	2	59,792	11.92%	0
Total	234	60	501,473		
Source: ECI

=== Results by constituency ===
Winner, runner-up, voter turnout, and victory margin in every constituency
Assembly Constituency		Turnout	Winner				Runner Up				Margin
#k	Names	%	Candidate	Party	Votes	%	Candidate	Party	Votes	%	Margin
1	Simna	75.04%	Bhadramani Debbarma	CPI(M)	4,594	53.02%	S. B. Kishore Debbarman	INC	3,656	42.2%	938
2	Mohanpur	66.05%	Radharaman Debnath	CPI(M)	4,277	51.58%	Pram D. Ranjan Dasgupta	INC	3,592	43.32%	685
3	Bamutia	71.4%	Prafulla Kumar Das	INC	4,862	61.72%	Brajendra Biswas	CPI(M)	3,015	38.28%	1,847
4	Barjala	67.67%	Basana Chakraborty	INC	3,733	55.67%	Gouri Bhattacharjee	CPI(M)	2,307	34.4%	1,426
5	Kunjaban	65.46%	Ashok Kumar Bhattacharya	INC	7,033	52.38%	Kanu Ghosh	CPI(M)	5,633	41.95%	1,400
6	Pratapgarh	62.8%	Madhusudan Das	INC	3,862	49.%	Jadab Chandra Majumder	CPI(M)	3,593	45.59%	269
7	Agartala Town III	59.74%	Sukhamoy Sen Gupta	INC	4,415	49.44%	Supriyo Bhowmik	CPI(M)	2,963	33.18%	1,452
8	Ananda Nagar	68.21%	Tarit Mohan Dasgupta	INC	4,341	45.07%	Khagen Das	CPI(M)	4,159	43.18%	182
9	Agartala Town I	64.27%	Ajoy Biswas	Independent	3,810	50.28%	Renuka Chakraborty	INC	2,742	36.19%	1,068
10	Agartala Town II	65.01%	Krishnadas Bhattacharjee	INC	3,009	48.01%	Ashoke Chakraborty	CPI(M)	2,322	37.05%	687
11	Old Agartala	70.44%	Sailesh Chandra Some	INC	5,098	56.76%	Jagadish Chandra Dey	CPI(M)	2,217	24.69%	2,881
12	Majlishpur	70.59%	Jatindra Kumar Majumder	INC	3,724	54.79%	Bhanu Gosh	CPI(M)	3,073	45.21%	651
13	Mandaibazar	65.98%	Kalidas Debbarma	CPI(M)	4,717	66.28%	Bagala Prasad Debbarma	INC	1,664	23.38%	3,053
14	Uttar Debendranagar	69.%	Sabhiram Debbarma	CPI(M)	4,208	56.51%	Rabindra K. Debbarma	INC	1,949	26.18%	2,259
15	Ishanchandranagar	69.56%	Naresh Chandra Roy	INC	3,349	46.62%	Mati Lal Sarkar	CPI(M)	3,328	46.33%	21
16	Takarjala	65.21%	Gunapada Jamatia	CPI(M)	3,461	41.37%	Mahendra Debbarma	INC	3,049	36.45%	412
17	Kamalasagar	75.41%	Bichitra Mohan Saha	INC	3,936	52.56%	Nagendra Deb	CPI(M)	2,316	30.93%	1,620
18	Bishalgarh	73.54%	Samir Ranjan Barman	INC	2,777	32.32%	Babul Sengupta	CPI(M)	2,638	30.7%	139
19	Charilam	67.03%	Niranjan Deb	CPI(M)	2,805	36.78%	Monmohan Debbarma	INC	2,474	32.44%	331
20	Bishramganj	69.65%	Sudhanwa Debbarma	CPI(M)	2,745	35.12%	Deuan Chandra Tripura	INC	2,479	31.72%	266
21	Boxanagar	74.34%	Munsur Ali	INC	3,787	54.69%	Phani Bhushan Bhakta	CPI(M)	2,097	30.29%	1,690
22	Nalchar	67.01%	Benode Behari Das	INC	4,078	48.77%	Hari Madhab Bhowmik	CPI(M)	3,199	38.26%	879
23	Sonamura	65.74%	Debendra Kishore Chowdhury	INC	3,340	55.44%	Sultan Miah	Independent	1,504	24.97%	1,836
24	Dhanpur	67.66%	Samar Chowdhury	CPI(M)	3,530	48.64%	Dhirendra Kumar Sengupta	INC	2,757	37.99%	773
25	Salgarh	69.29%	Tapash Dey	INC	3,966	48.67%	Abani Mohan Bhowmik	CPI(M)	2,907	35.67%	1,059
26	Kakraban	69.4%	Ajit Ranjan Ghosh	INC	3,387	43.19%	Kashab Chandra Majumder	CPI(M)	2,849	36.33%	538
27	Radhakishorpur	72.7%	Usha Ranjan Sen	INC	4,888	48.37%	Sushil Mukerjee	CPI(M)	3,509	34.73%	1,379
28	Matarbari	67.34%	Nishi Kanta Sarkar	INC	3,851	45.7%	Naresh Chandra Ghosh	CPI(M)	3,215	38.16%	636
29	Rajnagar	63.83%	Lakshmi Nag	INC	3,265	34.63%	Badal Chowdhury	CPI(M)	2,908	30.85%	357
30	Belonia	58.79%	Jitendra Lal Das	CPI	3,992	43.57%	Suresh Chandra Chowdhury	INC	3,627	39.59%	365
31	Hrishyamukh	63.1%	Chandra Sekhar Dutta	INC	5,911	66.14%	Amalendu Chakraborty	CPI(M)	2,613	29.24%	3,298
32	Muhuripur	58.6%	Achaichhi Mog	INC	4,394	55.93%	Brajamohan Jamatia	CPI(M)	2,583	32.88%	1,811
33	Manu	67.92%	Hari Chanran Choudhrury	INC	4,764	54.25%	Thaingya Mog	CPI(M)	3,157	35.95%	1,607
34	Sabroom	72.9%	Kalipada Banerji	INC	6,180	66.31%	Sunil Kumar Chowdhury	CPI(M)	3,140	33.69%	3,040
35	Chellagong	59.33%	Baju Ban Riyan	CPI(M)	3,032	41.25%	Panji Ham Reang	INC	2,989	40.67%	43
36	Birganj	66.57%	Sushil Ranjan Saha	INC	3,645	46.61%	Syamal Kantisaha	CPI(M)	3,142	40.17%	503
37	Dumburnagar	53.6%	Pakhi Tripura	CPI(M)	3,272	60.15%	Rajprasad Chowdhury	INC	1,664	30.59%	1,608
38	Ampinagar	59.63%	Bullu Kuki	CPI(M)	3,663	57.84%	Gopinath Jamatia	Independent	2,140	33.79%	1,523
39	Teliamura	73.05%	Anil Sarkar	CPI(M)	5,458	51.19%	Bir Chandra Barman	INC	3,847	36.08%	1,611
40	Mohar Chhera	72.83%	Ananta Hari Jamatia	INC	5,351	51.36%	Joy Mohan Debbarma	CPI(M)	3,691	35.43%	1,660
41	Kalyanpur	84.55%	Bidya Chandra Debbarma	CPI(M)	10,273	77.36%	Krishna Kumar Debbarma	INC	3,006	22.64%	7,267
42	Pramodenagar	79.25%	Manindra Debbarma	CPI(M)	7,439	61.25%	Nanda Kumar Debbarma	INC	4,707	38.75%	2,732
43	Khowai	76.52%	J Prasanna Bhattacharjee	INC	5,069	56.35%	Kaminisingh	CPI(M)	3,162	35.15%	1,907
44	Asharambari	82.01%	Nripen Chakraborty	CPI(M)	6,290	58.92%	Arun Kar	INC	4,137	38.75%	2,153
45	Kamalpur	75.44%	Sunil Chandra Datta	INC	4,422	49.45%	Makhan Datta	CPI(M)	3,768	42.14%	654
46	Surma	77.2%	Kshitish Chandra Das	INC	4,737	48.73%	Rudreswar Das	CPI(M)	4,202	43.23%	535
47	Kulaihower	67.21%	Mongchabai Mog	INC	6,380	55.81%	Dinesh Debbarma	CPI(M)	4,662	40.78%	1,718
48	Chawamanu	50.4%	Purna Mohan Tripura	CPI(M)	3,164	48.03%	Ghanshyam Dewan	INC	2,189	33.23%	975
49	Fatikroy	67.29%	Radhika Ranjan Gupta	INC	4,019	38.55%	Tarani Mohan Singha	CPI(M)	2,966	28.45%	1,053
50	Pabiachhara	60.46%	Gopi Nath Tripura	INC	3,973	50.09%	K. Mohan Debbarma	CPI(M)	3,279	41.34%	694
51	Chandipur	77.71%	Manindralal Bhowmik	INC	3,418	48.94%	Baidyanath Majumdar	CPI(M)	3,138	44.93%	280
52	Kailashahar	70.73%	Moulana Abdul Ratif	INC	4,299	55.43%	Bonode Dey	Independent	1,720	22.18%	2,579
53	Bilaspur	70.01%	Subal Chandra Biswas	INC	4,228	56.82%	Barindra Malaker	CPI(M)	2,230	29.97%	1,998
54	Jubarajnagar	65.03%	Monoranjan Nath	INC	3,777	51.37%	Ram Kumar Nath	CPI(M)	2,180	29.65%	1,597
55	Longai	57.45%	Hangshadhwaz Dewan	INC	3,690	46.41%	Indu Madhav Chakma	CPI(M)	2,156	27.12%	1,534
56	Kanchanpur	48.99%	Raimuni Reang Chowdhury	INC	3,126	46.66%	Len Prasad Reang	CPI(M)	2,138	31.92%	988
57	Deocherra	62.76%	Abdul Wazid	INC	3,399	44.97%	Karunamoy Nath Chowdhury	Independent	1,870	24.74%	1,529
58	Dharmanagar	66.35%	Amarendra Sarma	Independent	3,728	47.21%	Debiprasad Purkayastha	INC	3,489	44.19%	239
59	Kadamtala	61.99%	Benoy Bhushan Banerjee	INC	2,684	40.74%	Abdul Rup	Independent	1,717	26.06%	967
60	Sonichera	61.18%	Radha Raman Nath	INC	2,637	33.61%	Abdul Matin Chowdhury	Independent	1,551	19.77%	1,086

== Government formation ==
Indian National Congress (INC) won 41 out of 60 seats in the Legislative Assembly. The CPI-M won 18 seats in the Legislative Assembly. Sukhamoy Sen Gupta of the INC formed a government as Chief Minister on March 20, 1972.

Prafulla Kumar Das formed a government as Chief Minister on April 1, 1977.

Radhika Ranjan Gupta formed a coalition government with the Janata Party (JP) and the Left Front (LF) on July 26, 1977. Chief Minister Radhika Ranjan Gupta resigned, and the state of Tripura was placed under presidential rule from November 5, 1977 to January 5, 1978.
