= Sushanta Deb =

Indian politician

Sushanta Deb (born 1990) is an Indian politician from Tripura. He is a member of the Tripura Legislative Assembly from Bishalgarh Assembly constituency in Sipahijala district. He won the 2023 Tripura Legislative Assembly election, representing the Bharatiya Janata Party.

== Early life and education ==
Deb is from Bishalgarh, Sipahijala district, Tripura. He is the son of Sankar Chandra Deb. He passed Class 12 examination in 2007, conducted by the Tripura Board of Secondary Education.

== Career ==
Deb was elected from the Bishalgarh Assembly constituency representing the Bharatiya Janata Party in the 2023 Tripura Legislative Assembly election. He polled 22,314 votes and defeated his nearest rival, Partha Pratim Majumder of Communist Party of India (Marxist), by a margin of 1,326 votes.
