= Gitamohan Tripura =

Indian politician

Member of the Tripura Legislative Assembly
- In office 09 March 1998 – 2003
- Constituency: Jolaibari

Personal details
- Born: Tripura, India
- Party: Communist Party of India (Marxist)

Gitamohan Tripura is an Indian politician from Tripura. He is a member of Communist Party of India (Marxist) who won the election in 1998 from Jolaibari.
