= A. Debbarma =

Indian politician

A. Debbarma was an Indian politician and a leader of the Communist Party of India. He was a member of the Tripura Legislative Assembly, representing the Charilam constituency from 1967 to 1972.
