= Ramendra Narayan Debbarma =

Indian politician

Ramendra Narayan Debbarma (c. 1950 – 11 February 2018) was an Indian politician.

A member of the Communist Party of India (Marxist), he had worked in the public sector until 2012. He contested the 2013 Tripura Legislative Assembly elections, and was elected. Debbarma won support from the CPI (M) for the 2018 elections, but died of a cerebral stroke at Gobinda Ballav Panth Medical College and Hospital on 11 February 2018, a week before the election was to be held.
