= Brajamohan Jamatia =

Indian politician

Member of the Legislative Assembly of Tripura
- In office 1977–1983
- In office 1988–1993
- Constituency: Jolaibari

Personal details
- Born: 1905 Tripura (princely state)
- Died: March 2, 2012 (aged 106–107) Santirbazar
- Party: Communist Party of India (Marxist)

Brajamohan Jamatia (1905 – 2 March 2012) was an Indian politician. He was born and died in Manu.

== Career ==
Jamatia was born in a tribal peasant family in southern Tripura. Being illiterate, he came into contact with the Janasiksha Samiti literacy movement. In 1950 he became a member of the Communist Party of India. He was active in the struggle of the Ganamukti Parishad, and became a member of the Central Committee of that organization. In the 1964 split in the party, he sided with the Communist Party of India (Marxist). He became a member of the Tripura State Committee of the CPI(M).

He was elected to the Tripura Legislative Assembly in 1977 and again in 1988.

Jamatia spent several years underground. He was imprisoned eight times. He learned to read and write in prison. In total, his jail terms lasted for close to a decade.
