= 2024 Indian general election in Tripura =

Indian political election in Tripura

- 19 April 2024 and 26 April 2024

All 2 Tripura seats in the Lok Sabha
- Opinion polls
- Turnout: 80.92% (▼1.48%)
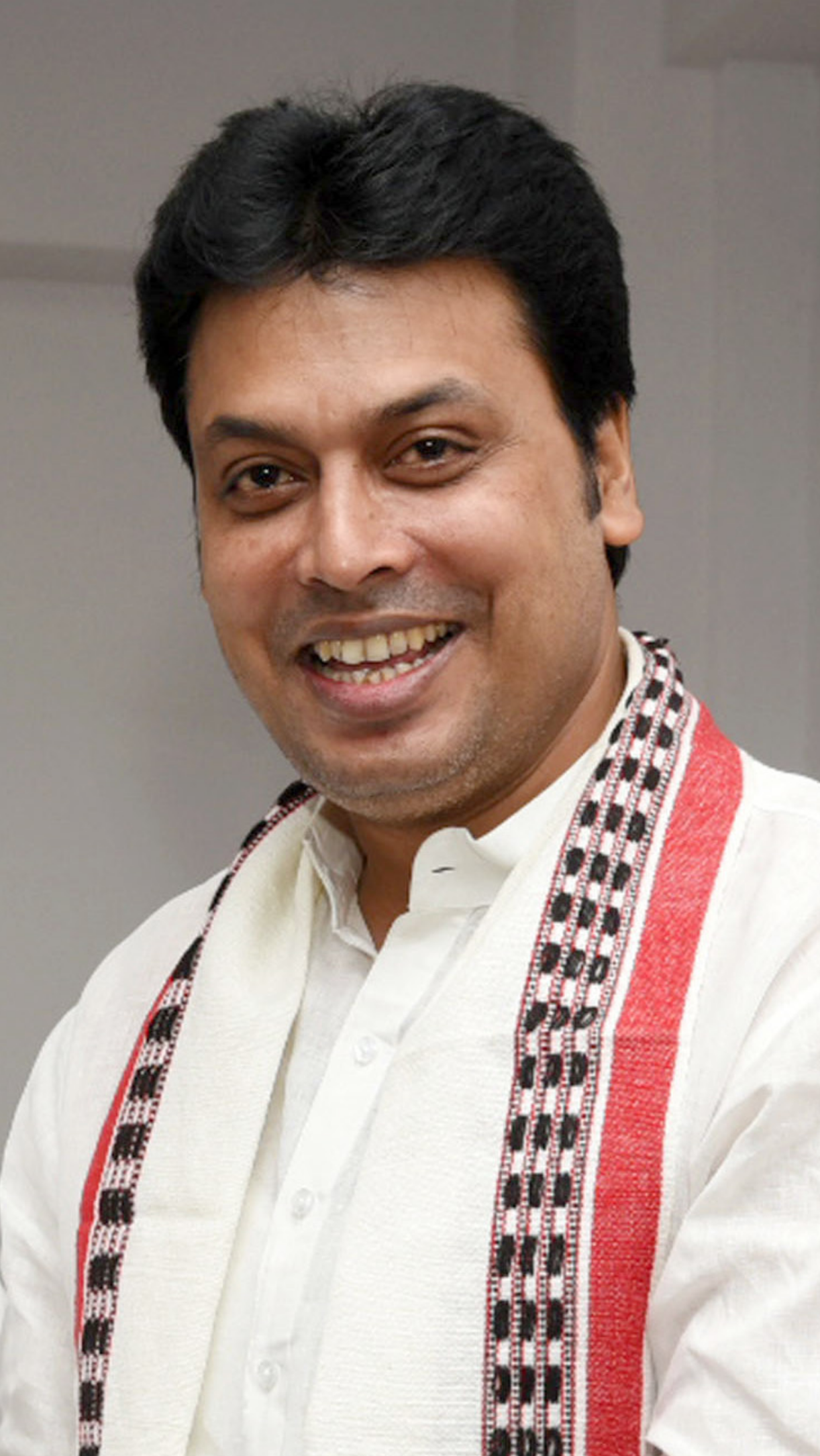

| | First party | Second party | Third party |
|---|---|---|---|
| Leader | Biplab Kumar Deb | Rajendra Reang | Ashish Kumar Saha |
| Party | BJP | CPI(M) | INC |
| Alliance | NDA | INDIA | INDIA |
| Leader since | 2022 | 2024 | 2022 |
| Leader's seat | Tripura West | Tripura East (lost) | Tripura West (lost) |
| Last election | 49.03%, 2 seat | 17.31%, 0 seat | 25.34%, 0 seat |
| Seats won | 2 | 0 | 0 |
| Seat change | Steady | Steady | Steady |
| Popular vote | 1,658,788 | 290,628 | 269,763 |
| Percentage | 70.8% | 12.4% | 11.51% |
| Swing | ▲21.8% | ▼4.9% | ▼13.9% |
- Seatwise Result Map of the 2024 general election in Tripura
Prime Minister before election
Narendra Modi
BJP
Prime Minister after election
Narendra Modi
BJP

The 2024 Indian general election was held in Tripura in 2 phases on 19 April 2024 and 26 April 2024 to elect 2 members of the 18th Lok Sabha. Bye-poll for Ramnagar was held with Phase-I of this election.

== Election schedule ==
| Poll event | Phase | |
|---|---|---|
| Poll event | I | II |
| Notification date | 20 March | 28 March |
| Last date for filing nomination | 27 March | 4 April |
| Scrutiny of nomination | 28 March | 5 April |
| Last Date for withdrawal of nomination | 30 March | 8 April |
| Date of poll | 19 April | 26 April |
| Date of counting of votes/Result | 4 June 2024 | |
| No. of constituencies | 1 | 1 |

== Parties and alliances ==
=== National Democratic Alliance ===
National Democratic Alliance

| Party | Flag | Symbol | Leader | Seats contested |
|---|---|---|---|---|
| Bharatiya Janata Party | | | Biplab Kumar Deb | 2 |
| Total | | | | 2 |

=== Indian National Developmental Inclusive Alliance ===
Indian National Developmental Inclusive Alliance

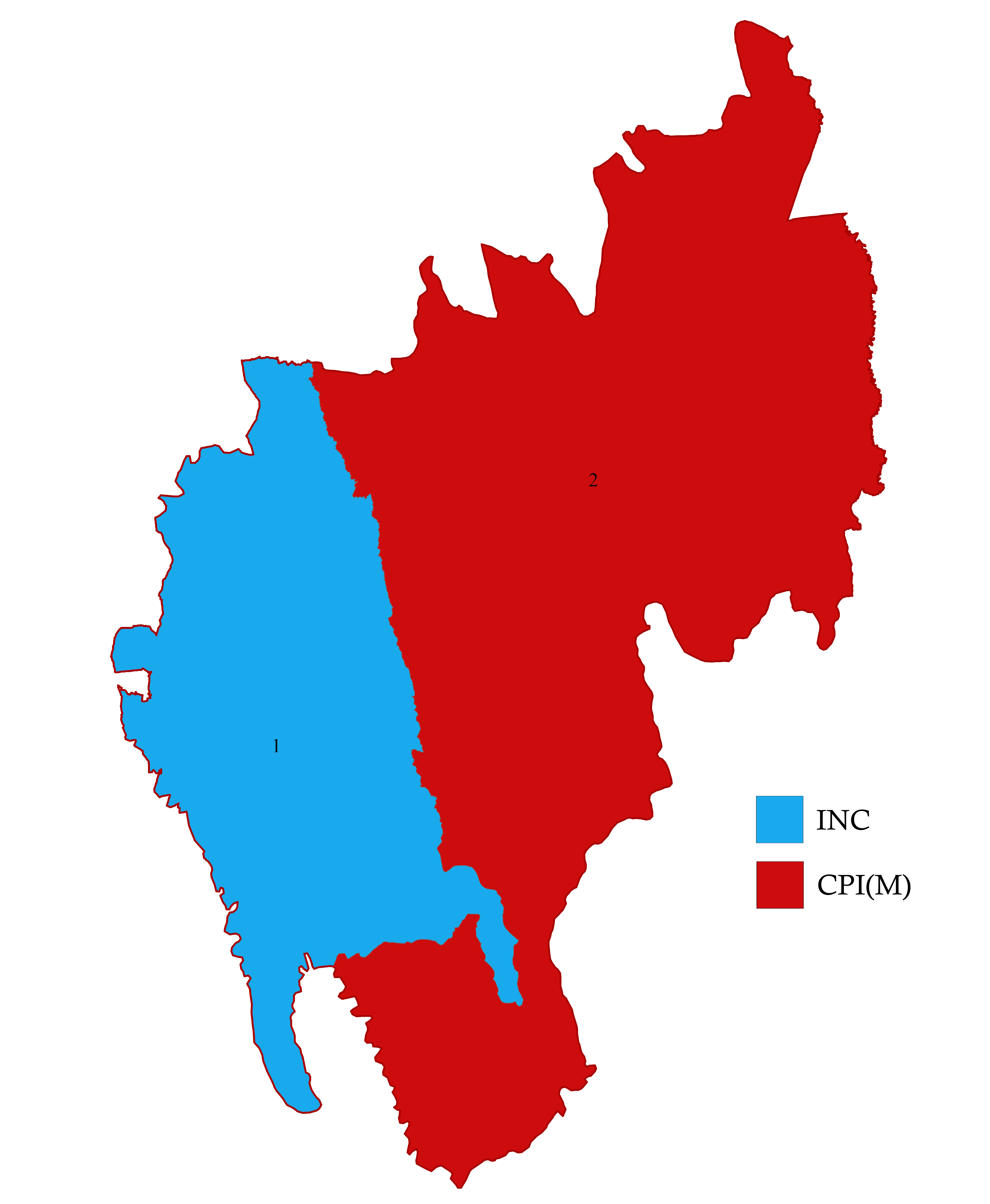

| Party | Flag | Symbol | Leader | Seats contested |
|---|---|---|---|---|
| Communist Party of India (Marxist) | | | Jitendra Chaudhury | 1 |
| Indian National Congress | | | Ashish Kumar Saha | 1 |
| Total | | | | 2 |

=== Others ===
| Party | Symbol | Contesting seats |
|---|---|---|
| Socialist Unity Centre of India (Communist) | | 1 |
| Republican Party of India (Athawale) | | 1 |

== Candidates ==
| Constituency | | NDA | | INDIA | |
| No. | Name | Party | Candidate | Party | Candidate |
|---|---|---|---|---|---|
| 1 | Tripura West | BJP | Biplab Kumar Deb | INC | Ashish Kumar Saha |
| 2 | Tripura East (ST) | BJP | Kriti Devi Debbarma | CPI(M) | Rajendra Reang |

== Surveys and polls ==
=== Opinion polls ===
| Polling agency | Date published | Margin of error | | | | Lead |
| Polling agency | Date published | Margin of error | NDA | INDIA | Others | Lead |
| ABP News-CVoter | March 2024 | ±5% | 2 | 0 | 0 | NDA |
TMP joins NDA
| Times Now-ETG | December 2023 | ±3% | 2 | 0 | 0 | NDA |
| India TV-CNX | October 2023 | ±3% | 2 | 0 | 0 | NDA |
| Times Now-ETG | September 2023 | ±3% | 2 | 0 | 0 | NDA |
| Times Now-ETG | August 2023 | ±3% | 1-2 | 0-1 | 0 | NDA |

=== Exit polls ===
| Polling agency | | | | Lead |
| Polling agency | NDA | INDIA | Others | Lead |
| DB Live | 0-2 | 0-2 | 0 | Tie |
| India Today-Axis My India | 2 | 0 | 0 | NDA |
| 2019 election | 2 | 0 | 0 | NDA |
| Actual results | 2 | 0 | 0 | NDA |

== Voter turnout ==
=== Phase wise ===
| Phase | Poll date | Constituencies | Voter turnout (%) |
|---|---|---|---|
| I | 19 April 2024 | Tripura West | 81.48% |
| II | 26 April 2024 | Tripura East | 80.36% |
| Total | | | 80.92% |

=== Constituency-wise ===
| Constituency | | Poll date | Turnout | Swing |
|---|---|---|---|---|
| 1 | Tripura West | 19 April 2024 | 81.48% | 0.45%▼ |
| 2 | Tripura East (ST) | 26 April 2024 | 80.36% | 2.54%▼ |

== Results ==
=== Results by alliance or party ===
| Alliance/ Party | | Popular vote | | | Seats | | |
| Alliance/ Party | | Votes | % | ±pp | Contested | Won | +/− |
|---|---|---|---|---|---|---|---|
| NDA | BJP | 16,58,788 | 70.79 | ▲21.76 | 2 | 2 | Steady |
| INDIA | CPI(M) | 2,90,628 | 12.40 | ▼4.91 | 1 | 0 | Steady |
| INDIA | INC | 2,69,763 | 11.51 | ▼13.85 | 1 | 0 | Steady |
| INDIA | Total | 5,60,391 | 23.91 | ▼18.76 | 2 | 0 | Steady |
| Others | | 12,233 | 0.52 | | 2 | 0 | Steady |
| IND | | 79,001 | 3.71 | | 12 | 0 | Steady |
| NOTA | | 32,915 | 1.40 | | | | |
| Total | | 23,43,328 | 100% | - | 18 | 2 | - |

=== Results by constituency ===
| Constituency | | Turnout | Winner | | | | | Runner-up | | | | | Margin | |
| Constituency | | Turnout | Party | Alliance | Candidate | Votes | % | Party | Alliance | Candidate | Votes | % | Votes | % |
|---|---|---|---|---|---|---|---|---|---|---|---|---|---|---|
| 1 | Tripura West | 81.48%▼ | BJP | NDA | Biplab Kumar Deb | 8,81,341 | 72.85 | INC | INDIA | Ashish Kumar Saha | 2,69,763 | 22.30 | 6,11,578 | 50.55% |
| 2 | Tripura East (ST) | 80.36%▼ | BJP | NDA | Kriti Devi Debbarman | 7,77,447 | 68.54 | CPI(M) | INDIA | Rajendra Reang | 2,90,628 | 25.62 | 4,86,819 | 42.92% |

== Assembly-wise leads ==
=== Party-wise leads ===
2024 Tripura Lok Sabha Elections Assembly Wise Map

| Party | | Assembly segments | Current Position in Assembly |
|---|---|---|---|
| NDA | BJP | 59 | 33 |
| NDA | TMP | Did Not Field Candidate | 13 |
| NDA | IPFT | Did Not Field Candidate | 1 |
| NDA | Total | 59 | 47 |
| INDIA | CPI(M) | 1 | 10 |
| INDIA | INC | 0 | 3 |
| INDIA | Total | 1 | 13 |
| Total | | 60 | |

=== Assembly seat-wise leads ===
| Constituency | | Winner | | | | Runner-up | | | | Margin |
| # | Name | Candidate | Party | Votes | % | Candidate | Party | Votes | % | Margin |
Tripura West Lok Sabha constituency
| 1 | Simna (ST) | Biplab Kumar Deb | BJP | 22,124 | 73.17 | Ashish Kumar Saha | INC | 5,826 | 19.27 | 16,298 |
| 2 | Mohanpur | Biplab Kumar Deb | BJP | 34,852 | 86.40 | Ashish Kumar Saha | INC | 3,883 | 9.62 | 30,969 |
| 3 | Bamutia (SC) | Biplab Kumar Deb | BJP | 28,866 | 71.46 | Ashish Kumar Saha | INC | 9,650 | 23.89 | 19,216 |
| 4 | Barjala (SC) | Biplab Kumar Deb | BJP | 27,892 | 70.78 | Ashish Kumar Saha | INC | 9,925 | 25.19 | 17,967 |
| 5 | Khayerpur | Biplab Kumar Deb | BJP | 33,381 | 79.64 | Ashish Kumar Saha | INC | 6,704 | 15.99 | 26,677 |
| 6 | Agartala | Biplab Kumar Deb | BJP | 27,158 | 63.79 | Ashish Kumar Saha | INC | 13,903 | 32.66 | 13,255 |
| 7 | Ramnagar | Biplab Kumar Deb | BJP | 23,433 | 70.44 | Ashish Kumar Saha | INC | 8,480 | 25.49 | 14,953 |
| 8 | Town Bordowali | Biplab Kumar Deb | BJP | 23,371 | 65.19 | Ashish Kumar Saha | INC | 11,493 | 32.06 | 11,878 |
| 9 | Banamalipur | Biplab Kumar Deb | BJP | 19,339 | 61.54 | Ashish Kumar Saha | INC | 11,142 | 35.46 | 8,197 |
| 10 | Majlishpur | Biplab Kumar Deb | BJP | 33,021 | 80.84 | Ashish Kumar Saha | INC | 6,232 | 15.26 | 26,789 |
| 11 | Mandaibazar (ST) | Biplab Kumar Deb | BJP | 28,235 | 77.57 | Ashish Kumar Saha | INC | 5,516 | 15.15 | 22,719 |
| 12 | Takarjala (ST) | Biplab Kumar Deb | BJP | 26,701 | 79.41 | Ashish Kumar Saha | INC | 4,046 | 12.03 | 22,655 |
| 13 | Pratapgarh (SC) | Biplab Kumar Deb | BJP | 34,897 | 69.96 | Ashish Kumar Saha | INC | 12,762 | 25.58 | 22,135 |
| 14 | Badharghat (SC) | Biplab Kumar Deb | BJP | 34,582 | 68.21 | Ashish Kumar Saha | INC | 13,776 | 27.17 | 20,806 |
| 15 | Kamalasagar (SC) | Biplab Kumar Deb | BJP | 26,433 | 70.56 | Ashish Kumar Saha | INC | 8,937 | 23.86 | 17,496 |
| 16 | Bishalgarh | Biplab Kumar Deb | BJP | 32,887 | 79.94 | Ashish Kumar Saha | INC | 6,703 | 16.29 | 26,184 |
| 17 | Golaghati (ST) | Biplab Kumar Deb | BJP | 26,976 | 77.49 | Ashish Kumar Saha | INC | 5,749 | 16.51 | 21,227 |
| 18 | Suryamaninagar | Biplab Kumar Deb | BJP | 35,254 | 73.92 | Ashish Kumar Saha | INC | 10,632 | 22.29 | 24,622 |
| 19 | Charilam (ST) | Biplab Kumar Deb | BJP | 26,602 | 82.03 | Ashish Kumar Saha | INC | 4,223 | 13.02 | 22,379 |
| 20 | Boxanagar | Biplab Kumar Deb | BJP | 26,505 | 70.79 | Ashish Kumar Saha | INC | 9,383 | 25.06 | 17,122 |
| 21 | Nalchar (SC) | Biplab Kumar Deb | BJP | 29,232 | 74.76 | Ashish Kumar Saha | INC | 8,143 | 20.82 | 21,089 |
| 22 | Sonamura | Biplab Kumar Deb | BJP | 24,626 | 65.70 | Ashish Kumar Saha | INC | 10,903 | 29.09 | 13,723 |
| 23 | Dhanpur | Biplab Kumar Deb | BJP | 27,346 | 66.20 | Ashish Kumar Saha | INC | 11,390 | 27.57 | 15,956 |
| 30 | Bagma (ST) | Biplab Kumar Deb | BJP | 31,960 | 74.27 | Ashish Kumar Saha | INC | 8,866 | 20.60 | 23,094 |
| 31 | Radhakishorepur | Biplab Kumar Deb | BJP | 29,083 | 72.37 | Ashish Kumar Saha | INC | 9,551 | 23.77 | 19,532 |
| 32 | Matarbari | Biplab Kumar Deb | BJP | 34,975 | 76.02 | Ashish Kumar Saha | INC | 9,022 | 19.61 | 25,953 |
| 33 | Kakraban–Salgarh (SC) | Biplab Kumar Deb | BJP | 33,733 | 74.81 | Ashish Kumar Saha | INC | 9,435 | 20.92 | 24,298 |
| 34 | Rajnagar (SC) | Biplab Kumar Deb | BJP | 28,121 | 69.26 | Ashish Kumar Saha | INC | 10,056 | 24.77 | 18,065 |
| 35 | Belonia | Biplab Kumar Deb | BJP | 26,012 | 67.05 | Ashish Kumar Saha | INC | 10,480 | 27.01 | 15,532 |
| 36 | Santirbazar (ST) | Biplab Kumar Deb | BJP | 30,887 | 71.70 | Ashish Kumar Saha | INC | 9,101 | 21.13 | 21,786 |
Tripura East Lok Sabha constituency
| 24 | Ramchandraghat (ST) | Kriti Devi Debbarman | BJP | 27,145 | 80.09 | Rajendra Reang | CPI(M) | 4,422 | 13.05 | 22,723 |
| 25 | Khowai | Kriti Devi Debbarman | BJP | 29,284 | 77.79 | Rajendra Reang | CPI(M) | 7,011 | 18.62 | 22,273 |
| 26 | Asharambari (ST) | Kriti Devi Debbarman | BJP | 24,151 | 76.76 | Rajendra Reang | CPI(M) | 4,728 | 15.03 | 19,423 |
| 27 | Kalyanpur | Kriti Devi Debbarman | BJP | 30,528 | 81.96 | Rajendra Reang | CPI(M) | 4,971 | 13.34 | 25,557 |
| 28 | Teliamura | Kriti Devi Debbarman | BJP | 28,309 | 76.74 | Rajendra Reang | CPI(M) | 6,927 | 18.78 | 21,382 |
| 29 | Krishnapur (ST) | Kriti Devi Debbarman | BJP | 24,294 | 76.05 | Rajendra Reang | CPI(M) | 5,748 | 17.99 | 18,546 |
| 37 | Hrishyamukh | Kriti Devi Debbarman | BJP | 29,000 | 71.45 | Rajendra Reang | CPI(M) | 9,493 | 23.39 | 19,507 |
| 38 | Jolaibari (ST) | Kriti Devi Debbarman | BJP | 29,432 | 69.74 | Rajendra Reang | CPI(M) | 9,795 | 23.21 | 19,637 |
| 39 | Manu (ST) | Kriti Devi Debbarman | BJP | 27,572 | 66.04 | Rajendra Reang | CPI(M) | 11,252 | 26.95 | 16,320 |
| 40 | Sabroom | Kriti Devi Debbarman | BJP | 26,505 | 63.49 | Rajendra Reang | CPI(M) | 12,747 | 30.53 | 13,758 |
| 41 | Ampinagar (ST) | Kriti Devi Debbarman | BJP | 22,317 | 73.68 | Rajendra Reang | CPI(M) | 6,139 | 20.27 | 16,178 |
| 42 | Amarpur | Kriti Devi Debbarman | BJP | 26,708 | 73.25 | Rajendra Reang | CPI(M) | 8,625 | 23.65 | 18,083 |
| 43 | Karbook (ST) | Kriti Devi Debbarman | BJP | 22,199 | 67.84 | Rajendra Reang | CPI(M) | 8,692 | 26.56 | 13,507 |
| 44 | Raima Valley (ST) | Kriti Devi Debbarman | BJP | 24,663 | 59.84 | Rajendra Reang | CPI(M) | 13,671 | 33.17 | 10,992 |
| 45 | Kamalpur | Kriti Devi Debbarman | BJP | 25,149 | 67.95 | Rajendra Reang | CPI(M) | 10,383 | 28.05 | 14,766 |
| 46 | Surma (SC) | Kriti Devi Debbarman | BJP | 26,807 | 69.51 | Rajendra Reang | CPI(M) | 10,072 | 26.12 | 16,735 |
| 47 | Ambassa (ST) | Kriti Devi Debbarman | BJP | 25,668 | 61.96 | Rajendra Reang | CPI(M) | 13,170 | 31.79 | 12,498 |
| 48 | Karamcherra (ST) | Kriti Devi Debbarman | BJP | 24,665 | 71.43 | Rajendra Reang | CPI(M) | 7,757 | 22.46 | 16,908 |
| 49 | Chawamanu (ST) | Kriti Devi Debbarman | BJP | 25,004 | 70.51 | Rajendra Reang | CPI(M) | 8,501 | 23.97 | 16,503 |
| 50 | Pabiachhara (ST) | Kriti Devi Debbarman | BJP | 28,459 | 69.45 | Rajendra Reang | CPI(M) | 11,071 | 27.02 | 17,388 |
| 51 | Fatikroy (SC) | Kriti Devi Debbarman | BJP | 28,249 | 76.62 | Rajendra Reang | CPI(M) | 7,619 | 20.66 | 20,630 |
| 52 | Chandipur | Kriti Devi Debbarman | BJP | 25,394 | 68.27 | Rajendra Reang | CPI(M) | 10,502 | 28.23 | 14,892 |
| 53 | Kailashahar | Rajendra Reang | CPI(M) | 19,809 | 51.53 | Kriti Devi Debbarman | BJP | 17,502 | 45.53 | 2,307 |
| 54 | Kadamtala–Kurti | Kriti Devi Debbarman | BJP | 21,464 | 57.26 | Rajendra Reang | CPI(M) | 14,659 | 39.10 | 6,805 |
| 55 | Bagbassa | Kriti Devi Debbarman | BJP | 25,140 | 68.34 | Rajendra Reang | CPI(M) | 10,624 | 28.88 | 14,516 |
| 56 | Dharmanagar | Kriti Devi Debbarman | BJP | 27,797 | 77.90 | Rajendra Reang | CPI(M) | 7,250 | 20.32 | 20,547 |
| 57 | Jubarajnagar | Kriti Devi Debbarman | BJP | 25,741 | 69.58 | Rajendra Reang | CPI(M) | 10,372 | 28.04 | 15,369 |
| 58 | Panisagar | Kriti Devi Debbarman | BJP | 23,499 | 67.56 | Rajendra Reang | CPI(M) | 9,656 | 27.76 | 13,843 |
| 59 | Pencharthal (ST) | Kriti Devi Debbarman | BJP | 21,239 | 61.43 | Rajendra Reang | CPI(M) | 11,368 | 32.88 | 9,871 |
| 60 | Kanchanpur (ST) | Kriti Devi Debbarman | BJP | 24,245 | 64.94 | Rajendra Reang | CPI(M) | 10,738 | 28.76 | 13,507 |

== See also ==
- 2024 Indian general election in Uttar Pradesh
- 2024 Indian general election in Uttarakhand
- 2024 Indian general election in West Bengal
