= Sarkar ministry =

Sarkar ministry may refer to:

- East Pakistan ministries
  - First Abu Hussain Sarkar ministry (1955–1956)
  - Second Abu Hussain Sarkar ministry (1958)
  - Third Abu Hussain Sarkar ministry (1958)
- Tripura ministries
  - First Manik Sarkar ministry (1998–2003)
  - Second Manik Sarkar ministry (2003–2008)
  - Third Manik Sarkar ministry (2008–2013)
  - Fourth Manik Sarkar ministry (2013–2018)
