= Pratima Bhoumik =

Indian politician

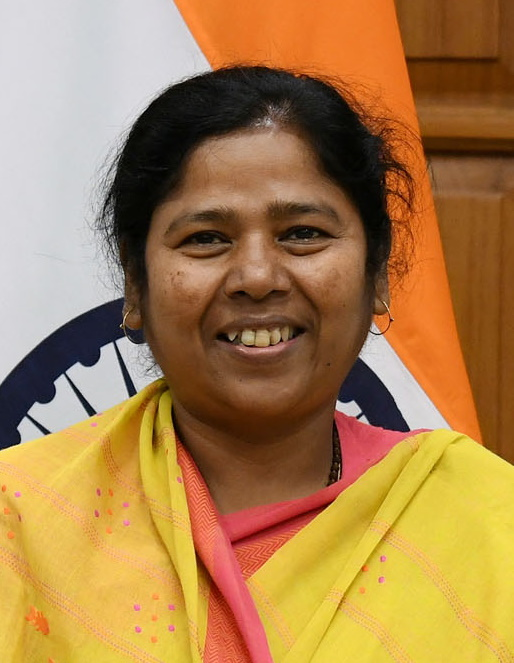

Union Minister of State for Social Justice and Empowerment
- In office 7 July 2021 – 11 June 2024 Serving with Ramdas Athawale and A. Narayanaswamy
- Prime Minister: Narendra Modi
- Minister: Virendra Kumar Khatik
- Preceded by: Rattan Lal Kataria

Member of Parliament, Lok Sabha
- In office 23 May 2019 – 4 June 2024
- Preceded by: Sankar Prasad Datta
- Succeeded by: Biplab Kumar Deb
- Constituency: Tripura West

Member of the Tripura Legislative Assembly
- In office 2 March 2023 – 15 March 2023
- Preceded by: Manik Sarkar
- Succeeded by: Bindu Debnath
- Constituency: Dhanpur

General Secretary of Bharatiya Janata Party, Tripura
- Incumbent
- Assumed office 6 January 2016
- President: Biplab Kumar Deb; Manik Saha

Personal details
- Born: 28 May 1969 (age 57) Barnarayan, Sepahijala, Tripura, India
- Party: Bharatiya Janata Party
- Education: Women's College, Agartala

Pratima Bhoumik (born 28 May 1969) is an Indian politician from Tripura. She served as the Minister of State in the Ministry of Social Justice and Empowerment in the Second Modi ministry from 7 July 2021 to 11 June 2024.

== Early life and education ==
Bhoumik was born in Barnarayan, Sipahijala District, Tripura. She is the daughter of late Debendra Kumar Bhoumik. She completed her degree in bio-science in 1991 at Women's College, Agartala, which is affiliated with Tripura University.

== Career ==
In 2019, Bhoumik was elected to the Lok Sabha from the Tripura West constituency as a member of the Bharatiya Janata Party, having defeated the sitting MP and Communist Party of India (Marxist) candidate Sankar Prasad Datta and the Congress candidate Subal Bhowmick by a huge margin. She was also elected to the Tripura Legislative Assembly in 2023 from the Dhanpur Assembly constituency but resigned a few days later to retain her Lok Sabha seat and ministerial portfolio. Since 2016, she has also been a State General Secretary of the BJP Tripura unit.

=== As party whip of Lok Sabha ===
Bhoumik was included on the Bharatiya Janata Party's Lok Sabha whip list.

=== As a Member of Parliament ===
Bhoumik was elected to the 17th Lok Sabha, from Tripura West. After the result was formally declared, in an interview with IANS, the 50-year-old science graduate said: "I would work for the all-round development of the state. Prime Minister Narendra Modi and party president Amit Shah's development mantra and vision are our future course of action for the welfare of the people."

Bhowmik secured 5,73,532 votes (51.77 per cent of the valid votes polled) and won the Tripura West seat, defeating her Congress rival Subal Bhowmik by a margin of 3,05,689 votes. She is the second female member of the Lok Sabha from Tripura after Congress' Bibhu Kumari Devi, also a former Tripura minister, who won in 1991.

=== Lok Sabha Standing Committee ===
- Member, Standing Committee on Food, Consumer Affairs and Public Distribution
- Member, Committee on Absence of Members from the Sittings of the House

=== Contribution of the first salary ===
Pratima Bhowmik, the Lok Sabha MP from Tripura West parliamentary constituency, donated Rs 100,000 from her first month's salary for Assam flood relief. At least 67 people had died and 3,355,837 had been affected in the deluge that inundated over 2,000 villages in 17 districts of Assam.

=== Union Minister ===
She became Minister of State Ministry of Social Justice and Empowerment in Second Modi ministry when cabinet overhaul happened. She became first Central Minister from Tripura.
