= Prem Kumar Reang =

Indian politician

Ministry of Fisheries, Co-Operation & Tribal Welfare (TRP&PTG)

Minister
- In office 2022–2023
- Chief Minister: Manik Saha

Member of the Tripura Legislative Assembly
- In office 09 March 2018 – 2023
- Preceded by: Rajendra Reang
- Succeeded by: Philip Kumar Reang
- Constituency: Kanchanpur

Personal details
- Born: 10 May 1974 (age 52) Gachi Ram Para, Ananda Bazar, North Tripura, Tripura
- Party: Indigenous People's Front of Tripura
- Spouse: Manda Dhari Reang
- Parents: (Father) Bhubanjoy Reang; (Mother) Khumbati Reang

Prem Kumar Reang (born 10 May 1974) is a politician from Tripura. He is currently associated with the Indigenous People's Front of Tripura. He was elected from the Kanchanpur constituency in the 2018 Tripura Legislative Assembly election.

In 2022, he became Minister of Fisheries and Co-Operation and Tribal Welfare (TRP & PTG) in the Manik Saha ministry. He became an active advocate regarding the Bru refugee issue.

== See also ==
1. Tripuri people
2. Indigenous Peoples Front of Tripura
3. Tripura
