= List of Rajya Sabha members from Tripura =

The list of current and past Rajya Sabha members from the Tripura State. State elect 1 member for the term of 6 years and indirectly elected by the state legislators, since year 1964.

== List of all Rajya Sabha members from Tripura state ==
Name	Party	Term start	Term end	Term
Arman Ali Munshi (Note: Manipur and Tripura)	Others	03/04/1952	02/04/1954	1
Ng Tompok Singh	Indian National Congress	03/04/1954	02/04/1956	1
Abdul Latif	Indian National Congress	03/04/1956	02/04/1962	1
Tarit Mohan Dasgupta	Indian National Congress	03/04/1962	02/03/1967 (Note: Resigned)	1
Triguna Sen	Indian National Congress	27/04/1967 (Note: Bye-election due to resignation of Tarit Mohan Dasgupta)	02/04/1968	1
Triguna Sen	Indian National Congress	03/04/1968	02/04/1974	2
Bir Chandra Deb Burman	Communist Party of India	03/04/1974	02/04/1980	1
Ila Bhattacharya	Communist Party of India (Marxist)	03/04/1980	02/04/1986	1
Narayan Kar	Communist Party of India (Marxist)	03/04/1986	02/04/1992	1
Sudhir Ranjan Majumdar	Indian National Congress	03/04/1992	02/04/1998	1
Khagen Das	Communist Party of India (Marxist)	03/04/1998	25/02/2002 (Note: Resigned on 25/02/2002)	1
Matilal Sarkar	Communist Party of India (Marxist)	22/05/2002 (Note: Bye-election in 2002 due to resignation of Khagen Das)	02/04/2004	1
Matilal Sarkar	Communist Party of India (Marxist)	03/04/2004	02/04/2010	2
Jharna Das	Communist Party of India (Marxist)	03/04/2010	02/04/2016	1
Jharna Das	Communist Party of India (Marxist)	03/04/2016	02/04/2022	2
Manik Saha	Bharatiya Janata Party	03/04/2022	14/05/2022 (Note: Resign and Sworn in as CM)	1
Biplab Kumar Deb	Bharatiya Janata Party	22/10/2022 (Note: Bye-election due to Resignetion of Manik Saha)	04/06/2024 (Note: Elected in 18th Loksabha)	1
Rajib Bhattacharjee	Bharatiya Janata Party	03/09/2024 (Note: Bye-election due to Resignetion of Biplab Kumar Deb)	02/04/2028	1
