= Bharatiya Janata Party – Tripura =

Tripura affiliate of the Bharatiya Janata Party

Bharatiya Janata Party – Tripura ভারতীয় জনতা পার্টি – ত্রিপুরা (Bengali) Bharatiya Janata Parti – Twipra (Kokborok)
- Abbreviation: BJP
- Leader: Manik Saha (Chief Minister)
- President: Abhishek Debroy
- Founder: Atal Bihari Vajpayee; Lal Krishna Advani; Murli Manohar Joshi; Nanaji Deshmukh; K. R. Malkani; Sikandar Bakht; Vijay Kumar Malhotra; Vijaya Raje Scindia; Bhairon Singh Shekhawat; Shanta Kumar; Ram Jethmalani; Jagannathrao Joshi
- Founded: 6 April 1980 (46 years ago)
- Split from: Janata Party
- Preceded by: Bharatiya Jana Sangh (1951–1977); Janata Party (1977–1980)
- Headquarters: 12-A, Krishnanagar Main Road,(In between Advisor & Bijoy Kumar Chowmuhani), Po.Agartala(Main), Dist.West Tripura-799 001, Tripura, India
- Newspaper: Kamal Sandesh
- Youth wing: Bharatiya Janata Yuva Morcha
- Women's wing: BJP Mahila Morcha
- Labour wing: Bharatiya Mazdoor Sangh
- Peasant's wing: Bharatiya Kisan Sangh
- Ideology: Integral humanism; Social conservatism; Economic nationalism; Hindu nationalism; Cultural nationalism Faction Tripuri Rights Pro-NRC
- Colours: Saffron
- Alliance: National level National Democratic Alliance; NorthEast Region; North East Democratic Alliance
- Seats in Rajya Sabha: 1 / 1 (as of 2024)
- Seats in Lok Sabha: 2 / 2 (as of 2024)
- Seats in Tripura Legislative Assembly: 33 / 60 (as of 2026)
- Seats in Tripura Tribal Areas Autonomous District Council: 4 / 30 (as of 2026)

Election symbol
- Lotus

Party flag

Website
- www.bjp.org/tripura

Bharatiya Janata Party – Tripura (BJP Tripura) is the Tripura affiliate of the Bharatiya Janata Party in India. It is currently chaired by Rajib Bhattacharjee. It is currently the state's ruling party, with its headquarters at 12-A, Krishnanagar Main Road, (between Advisor and Bijoy Kumar Chowmuhani), Po.Agartala(Main), Dist.West Tripura-799 001.

== Electoral performance ==
=== Lok Sabha Election ===
Year	Seats won	+/-	Outcome
2019	2 / 2	▲2	Government
2024	2 / 2	Steady	Government

=== Legislative Assembly Election ===
Year	Seats won	+/-	Voteshare (%)	+/- (%)	Outcome
1983	0 / 60	New	0.06%	New	None
1988	0 / 60	Steady	0.15%	▲0.09%	None
1993	0 / 60	Steady	2.02%	▲1.87%	None
1998	0 / 60	Steady	5.87%	▲3.85%	None
2003	0 / 60	Steady	1.32%	▼4.55%	None
2008	0 / 60	Steady	1.49%	▲0.17%	None
2013	0 / 60	Steady	1.54%	▲0.05%	None
2018	36 / 60	▲36	43.59%	▲41.5%	Government
2023	32 / 60	▼4	38.97%	▼4.62%	Government

=== In Local Elections ===
==== Municipal corporation election results ====
Year	Municipal Corporation	Seats contested	Seats won	Change in seats	Percentage of votes	Vote swing
Tripura
2015	Agartala	51	0 / 51	Steady		
2021	Agartala	51	51 / 51	▲51	57.39%	

==== Autonomous District Council election ====
Year	Autonomous District Council	Seats contested	Seats won	Change in seats	Percentage of votes	Vote swing	Government
Khumulwng
1982	From 1982 election has been held at Tripura Tribal Areas Autonomous District Council but BJP to win any seats was on 2021 election.						
2021	TTAADC	26	9 / 30	▲9			Government
2026	TTAADC	28	4 / 30	▼5			Government

==== 2015 Tripura local elections ====
In 2015 local election BJP won 2 seats of 310 at various municipal council and one municipal corporation.

==== 2021 Tripura local elections ====
In 2021 local election BJP won 329 seats of 334 at various municipal council and one municipal corporation, with vote percentage of 59.01%.

== Leadership ==
=== Chief ministers ===
No.	Portrait	Name	Constituency	Term of office			Assembly
1		Biplab Kumar Deb	Banamalipur	9 March 2018	15 May 2022	4 years, 67 days	12th
2		Manik Saha	Town Bordowali	15 May 2022	12 March 2023	301 days	12th
2		Manik Saha	Town Bordowali	13 March 2023	Incumbent	3 years, 211 days	13th

=== Deputy chief ministers ===
No	Portrait	Name	Constituency	Term of Office			Assembly	Chief Minister	Ref.
1		Jishnu Dev Varma	Charilam	9 March 2018	2 March 2023	4 years, 358 days	12th	Biplab Kumar Deb; Manik Saha	

=== Rajya Sabha Members ===
No	Name	Constituency	From	To
1	Rajib Bhattacharjee	Tripura	03/09/2024	02/04/2028

=== Lok Sabha Members ===
No	Portrait	Name	Constituency	Win Margin in 2024
1		Biplab Kumar Deb	Tripura West	6,11,578
2		Kriti Devi Debbarman	Tripura East	4,86,819

=== State President List ===
State Presidents
Sl. No.	Name	Portrait	Start year	End year
1	Sudheendradas Gupta		1980	2016
2	Biplab Kumar Deb		2016	2018
3	Manik Saha		2018	2022
4	Rajib Bhattacharjee		2022	2026
5	Abhishek Debroy		2026	Incumbent

== See also ==
- Biplab Kumar Deb
- Manik Saha
- Bharatiya Janata Party
- National Democratic Alliance
- North East Democratic Alliance
- Indigenous People's Front of Tripura
- Communist Party of India (Marxist), Tripura
