= Rajib Bhattacharjee =

Indian politician

Member of Parliament, Rajya Sabha from Tripura
- Incumbent
- Assumed office 27 August 2024
- Preceded by: Biplab Kumar Deb

President of Bharatiya Janata Party, Tripura
- In office 26 August 2022 – 28 May 2026
- President: J. P. Nadda; Nitin Nabin
- Preceded by: Manik Saha
- Succeeded by: Abhishek Debroy

Personal details
- Party: Bharatiya Janata Party (since 1991)

Rajib Bhattacharjee is an Indian politician who is serving as Member of Parliament, Rajya Sabha from Tripura since 2024. A member of Bharatiya Janata Party (BJP), he served as State Party President of BJP in Tripura since 2022.

== Early career ==
Bhattacharjee became a Rashtriya Swayamsevak Sangh (RSS) volunteer since 1988. Three years after joining the RSS, Bhattacharjee joined the BJP in 1991.

He has worked at almost every level of the party's organisation, including as a local BJP worker, Mandal president in the Banamalipur Assembly constituency, general secretary of the party's town organisational district in West Tripura, treasurer of the party's state committee, and party general secretary and vice-president. In 2022, he was named the BJP's Tripura President.
