= Second Manik Sarkar ministry =

- Ministry of Tripura
- Date formed: 7 March 2003
- Date dissolved: 10 March 2008

People and organisations
- Governors: Krishna Mohan Seth (until2003); Dinesh Nandan Sahay (from 2003)
- Chief Minister: Manik Sarkar
- No. of ministers: 18
- Member parties: CPI(M)(16 Ministers); CPI(1 Minister); RSP(1 Minister)
- Status in legislature: Majority
- Opposition party: INC
- Opposition leader: Ratan Lal Nath

History
- Election: 2003
- Legislature term: 5 years
- Predecessor: Sarkar I
- Successor: Sarkar III

The Second Sarkar ministry was the council of ministers of the Indian state of Tripura and the second ministry under chief minister Manik Sarkar of the Communist Party of India (Marxist) which was formed on 7 March 2003 following the party's third consecutive victory in the state legislative assembly election.

The ministry was formed after CPI(M) winning the 2003 Tripura Legislative Assembly election which was held in 26 February in the state. Manik Sarkar was sworn as the Chief Ministers of Tripura on 7 March 2003.

The ministry has 18 ministers. 16 Minister including the Chief Minister belongs to the CPI(M), while 1 each belongs to the CPI and RSP.

== Council of Ministers ==
The Cabinet Ministers sworn on 7 March 2003.

Sno.	Name	Office	Portfolio	Took Office	Left Office
1	Manik Sarkar	Chief Minister	Home (excluding Jail & Fire Services); Planning and Co-ordination; Land and Land Reforms; Other departments not allocated to any minister	7 March 2003	
2	Anil Sarkar	Cabinet Minister		7 March 2003	
3	Badal Choudhury	Cabinet Minister		7 March 2003	
4	Manik Dey	Cabinet Minister		7 March 2003	
5	Narayan Rupini	Cabinet Minister		7 March 2003	
6	Keshab Mazumdar	Cabinet Minister	Parliamentary Affairs	7 March 2003	
7	Pranab Debbarma	Cabinet Minister		7 March 2003	
8	Subodh Das	Cabinet Minister		7 March 2003	
9	Sukumar Barman	Cabinet Minister		7 March 2003	
10	Jitendra Chaudhury	Cabinet Minister		7 March 2003	
11	Fayzur Rehman	Cabinet Minister		7 March 2003	
12	Sukumar Barman	Cabinet Minister		7 March 2003	
13	Gopal Das	Cabinet Minister		7 March 2003	
14	Manindra Reang	Cabinet Minister		7 March 2003	
15	Pabitra Kar	Cabinet Minister		7 March 2003	
16	Tapan Chakraborty	Cabinet Minister		7 March 2003	
17	Bijoy Laxmi Sinha	Cabinet Minister		7 March 2003	
18	Khagendra Jamatia	Cabinet Minister		7 March 2003	
