= First Manik Sarkar ministry =

- Ministry of Tripura
- Date formed: 11 March 1998
- Date dissolved: 7 March 2003

People and organisations
- Governor: Siddheshwar Prasad
- Chief Minister: Manik Sarkar
- No. of ministers: 17
- Member parties: CPI(M)(15 Ministers); CPI(1 Minister); RSP(1 Minister)
- Status in legislature: Majority
- Opposition party: INC
- Opposition leader: Samir Ranjan Barman (29 July 1998 - 6 February 2000); Jawahar Saha (7 February 2000 - 28 February 2003)

History
- Election: 1998
- Legislature term: 5 years
- Predecessor: Dasarath Deb Ministry
- Successor: Sarkar II

The First Manik Sarkar ministry was the cabinet ministry of Tripura led by the Chief Minister Manik Sarkar, which was formed after 1998 Tripura Legislative Assembly election which was held in 16 February in the state.

Manik Sarkar was the leader of CPI(M) who was sworn as the Chief Ministers of Tripura on 11 March 1998, which led to the formation of his ministry for the first time. He was administered the oath by Governor Siddheshwar Prasad in presence of the former Chief Minister of Dasarath Deb.

The ministry had 17 ministers. 15 Minister including the Chief Minister belonged to the CPI(M), while 1 each belonged to the CPI and RSP.

== Council of Ministers ==
Ministers sworn on 11 March 1998.

Sno.	Name	Office	Portfolio	Took Office	Left Office
1	Manik Sarkar	Chief Minister	Home (excluding Jail & Fire Services); Planning and Co-ordination; Land and Land Reforms; Other departments not allocated to any minister	11 March 1998	
2	Anil Sarkar	Cabinet Minister		11 March 1998	
3	Badal Choudhury	Cabinet Minister		11 March 1998	
4	Aghore Debbarma	Cabinet Minister		11 March 1998	
5	Narayan Rupini	Cabinet Minister		11 March 1998	
6	Keshab Mazumdar	Cabinet Minister		11 March 1998	
7	Bimal Sinha	Cabinet Minister		11 March 1998	
8	Subodh Das	Cabinet Minister		11 March 1998	
9	Niranjan Debbarma	Cabinet Minister		11 March 1998	
10	Jitendra Chaudhury	Cabinet Minister		11 March 1998	
11	Fayzur Rehman	Cabinet Minister		11 March 1998	
12	Sukumar Barman	Cabinet Minister		11 March 1998	
13	Gopal Das	Cabinet Minister		11 March 1998	
14	Durbajoy Reang	Cabinet Minister		11 March 1998	
15	Pabitra Kar	Cabinet Minister		11 March 1998	
16	Ananta Pal	Cabinet Minister		11 March 1998	
17	Ramendra Debnath	Cabinet Minister		11 March 1998	
