= Third Manik Sarkar ministry =

Council of Ministers of Tripura (2008–2013)

- 13th Ministry of Tripura

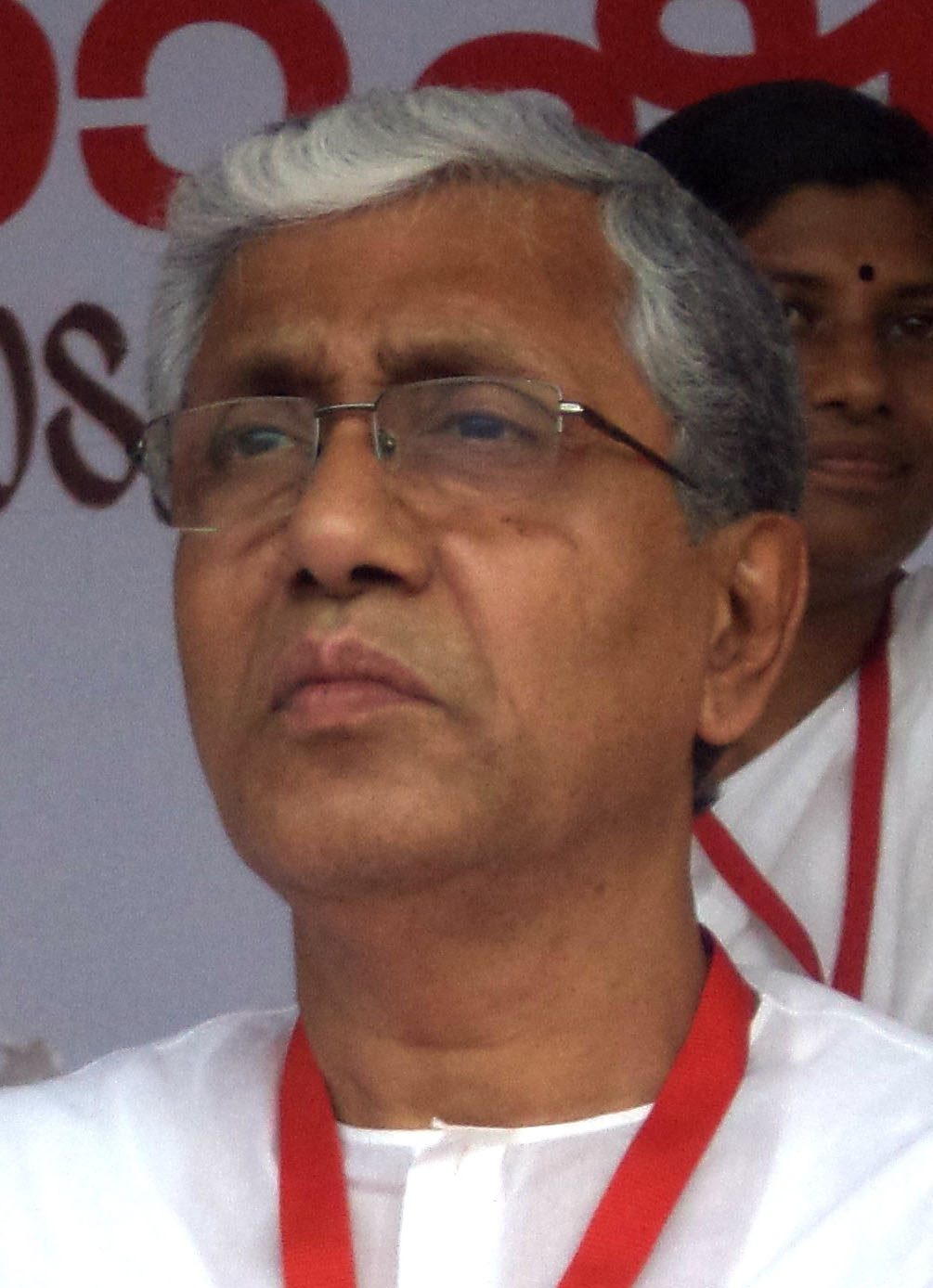
- Chief Minister Manik Sarkar
- Date formed: 10 March 2008
- Date dissolved: 5 March 2013

People and organisations
- Governors: Dinesh Nandan Sahay (until 2009); Kamla Beniwal (2009); D. Y. Patil (from 2009)
- Chief Minister: Manik Sarkar
- Member parties: Communist Party of India (Marxist)
- Status in legislature: Majority

History
- Election: 2008
- Outgoing election: 2013
- Legislature term: 5 years
- Predecessor: Sarkar II
- Successor: Sarkar IV

The Third Sarkar ministry was the 13th council of ministers of the Indian state of Tripura and the third ministry under chief minister Manik Sarkar of the Communist Party of India (Marxist) which was formed on 10 March 2008 following the party's fourth consecutive victory in the state legislative assembly election. Chief Minister Manik Sarkar was sworn in into office for the fourth consecutive term on 10 March 2008 along with his council of ministers by Governor Dinesh Nandan Sahay.

== Background ==
The ruling Communist Party of India (Marxist) returned to power for the fifth consecutive term, winning 46 of the 60 seats in the Tripura Legislative Assembly. Chief Minister Manik Sarkar was re-elected as the leader of the legislative party and subsequently sworn in as the chief minister on 10 March 2008.

== Cabinet formation ==
Chief Minister Manik Sarkar, along with eleven ministers, was sworn in into office on 10 March 2008. The ministers were Anil Sarkar, Aghore Debbarma, Badal Choudhury, Tapan Chakraborty, Manik Dey, Jitendra Chaudhury, Khagendra Jamatia, Joy Gobinda Debroy, Manindra Reang, and Bijita Nath. All the ministers except Joy Gobinda Debroy and Manindra Reang belonged to the Communist Party of India (Marxist), while Debroy belonged to the Revolutionary Socialist Party and Reang to the Communist Party of India.

== Ministers ==
Portfolio	Minister	Took office	Left office	Party
Chief Minister and also in-charge of the Departments of: Elections; General Administration (excluding Printing and Stationery); Home (excluding Jail and Fire Services); Law (excluding Parliamentary Affairs); Planning; Higher Education; All other department not assigned to any other Minister.	Manik Sarkar	10 March 2008	5 March 2013	CPI(M)
Minister of Higher Education; Minister of Information and Cultural Affairs; Minister of Welfare of Scheduled Castes	Anil Sarkar	10 March 2008	5 March 2013	CPI(M)
Minister of Agriculture; Minister of Tribal Welfare (excluding TRP and PGP); Minister of Animal Resource Development	Aghore Debbarma	10 March 2008	5 March 2013	CPI(M)
Minister of Finance; Minister of Public Works; Minister of Revenue	Badal Choudhury	10 March 2008	5 March 2013	CPI(M)
Minister of School Education; Minister of Health; Minister of Law (Parliamentary Affairs); Minister of Information Technology	Tapan Chakraborty	10 March 2008	5 March 2013	CPI(M)
Minister of Power; Minister of Transport; Minister of Panchayat; Minister of Urban Development; Minister of Labour	Manik Dey	10 March 2008	5 March 2013	CPI(M)
Minister of Rural Development (excluding Panchayat); Minister of Industries and Commerce (excluding Information Technology); Minister of Forest	Jitendra Chaudhury	10 March 2008	5 March 2013	CPI(M)
Minister of Co-operation; Minister of Fisheries	Khagendra Jamatia	10 March 2008	5 March 2013	CPI(M)
Minister of Science, Technology and Environment; Minister of Home (Fire Services); Minister of General Administration (Printing and Stationery)	Joy Gobinda Debroy	10 March 2008	5 March 2013	RSP
Minister of Home (Jails); Minister of Tribal Research and Planning and Primitive Tribal Group; Minister of General Administration (Printing and Stationery)	Manindra Reang	10 March 2008	5 March 2013	CPI
Minister of Social Welfare and Social Education; Minister of Welfare of Other Backward Classes	Bijita Nath	10 March 2008	5 March 2013	CPI(M)
