= Pramod Reang =

Nigerian politician

Member of the Tripura Legislative Assembly
- Incumbent
- Assumed office 2018
- Preceded by: Manindra Reang
- Constituency: Santirbazar

Personal details
- Born: Tripura, India
- Party: Bharatiya Janata Party

Pramod Reang is an Indian social worker and politician representing the Santirbazar in the Tripura Legislative Assembly. He represents the BJP, and was re-elected in the 2023 Tripura Legislative Assembly election.
