= Asoke Chandra Mitra =

Indian politician

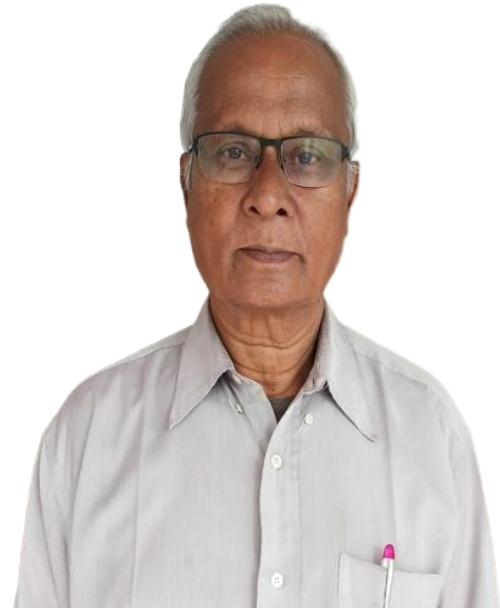

Member of the Tripura Legislative Assembly
- Incumbent
- Assumed office 2023
- Preceded by: Badal Choudhury
- Constituency: Hrishyamukh

Personal details
- Born: Asoke Chandra Mitra; 20 February 1949 (age 77) Tripura, India
- Party: Communist Party of India (Marxist)
- Spouse: Subhra Mitra
- Children: 2
- Education: Maharaja Bir Bikram College

Asoke Chandra Mitra (20 February 1949) is an Indian politician from Tripura. He is a member of the Tripura Legislative Assembly from the Hrishyamukh Assembly constituency in the South Tripura district representing the Communist Party of India (Marxist).

== Early life and education ==
Mitra is from Belonia, South Tripura District, Tripura. He is the son of the late Ramesh Chandra Mitra. He completed his B.Ed. in 1981 at Government B.Ed. College, Agartala, which is affiliated with the University of Calcutta, West Bengal. Earlier, he did his B.Sc. at Maharaja Bir Bikram College, Agartala, also under the University of Calcutta, in 1969. He is a retired government teacher.

== Career ==
Mitra was elected from the Hrishyamukh Assembly constituency representing the Communist Party of India (Marxist) in the 2023 Tripura Legislative Assembly election. He polled 19,986 votes and defeated his nearest rival, Dipayan Choudhury of the Bharatiya Janata Party, by a margin of 1,418 votes.
