= Antara Sarkar Deb =

Indian politician

Antara Sarkar Deb (born 1970) is an Indian politician from Tripura. She is an MLA from Kamalasagar Assembly constituency in the erstwhile West Tripura district, which is now Sipahijala district, representing the Bharatiya Janata Party. She was first elected in the 2023 Tripura Legislative Assembly election.

== Early life and education ==
Sarkar is from Surjyamaninagar, West Tripura district. She married Tapan Kumar Deb, a farmer. She studied till Class 10 of Tripura Board of secondary education and passed the Madhyamik examination in 1992. Later, she discontinued her studies.

== Career ==
Sarkar became an MLA winning the 2023 Tripura Legislative Assembly election from the Kamalasagar Assembly constituency representing the Bharatiya Janata Party. She polled 19,052 votes and defeated her nearest rival, Hiranmay Narayan Debnath of the Communist Party of India (Marxist), by a margin of 1,744 votes.
