= Drao Kumar Reang =

Indian Politician

Drao Kumar Riang

Member of the Tripura Legislative Assembly
- In office 9 March 1977 – 1983
- Succeeded by: Shyama Charan Tripura
- Constituency: Santirbazar

Member of the Tripura Legislative Assembly
- In office 1988–1993
- Succeeded by: Lenprasad Malsai
- Constituency: Kanchanpur

Personal details
- Born: Tripura, India
- Party: Tripura Upajati Juba Samiti; Indigenous Nationalist Party of Twipra
- Children: Philip Kumar Reang
- Education: University of Calcutta; University of Mumbai

Drao Kumar Riang was a Tipra-Indian politician from Tripura. He won the election as a Member of Legislative Assembly (MLA) representing Santirbazar in 1976. He also won in the 1988 Tripura Legislative Assembly election from the Kanchanpur Assembly constituency.

He was one of the prominent leaders of the Tripura Upajati Juba Samiti, which eventually merged into the Indigenous Nationalist Party of Twipra.
