= Kamalasagar Assembly constituency =

Legislative Assembly constituency in Tripura State, India

Coordinates: 23.74°N 91.17°E

Kamalasagar
- Constituency No. 15 for the Tripura Legislative Assembly

Constituency details
- Country: India
- Region: Northeast India
- State: Tripura
- District: Sipahijala
- Lok Sabha constituency: Tripura West
- Established: 1972
- Total electors: 43,634
- Reservation: None

Member of Legislative Assembly
- 13th Tripura Legislative Assembly
- Incumbent Antara Sarkar Deb
- Party: Bharatiya Janata Party
- Elected year: 2023

Kamalasagar is one of the 60 Legislative Assembly constituencies of Tripura state in India. It is in Sipahijala district and a part of West Tripura Lok Sabha constituency.

== Members of the Legislative Assembly ==
Election	Member	Party
1972	Bichitra Mohan Saha	Indian National Congress
1977	Matilal Sarkar	Communist Party of India
1983	Matilal Sarkar	Communist Party of India
1988	Matilal Sarkar	Communist Party of India
1993	Matilal Sarkar	Indian National Congress
1998	Narayan Chandra Chowdhury	Communist Party of India
2003	Narayan Chandra Chowdhury	Communist Party of India
2008	Narayan Chandra Chowdhury	Communist Party of India
2013	Narayan Chandra Chowdhury	Communist Party of India
2018	Narayan Chandra Chowdhury	Communist Party of India
2023	Antara Sarkar Deb	Bharatiya Janata Party

== Election results ==
=== 2023 Assembly election ===
2023 Tripura Legislative Assembly election: Kamalasagar
Party	Candidate	Votes	%	±%
BJP	Antara Sarkar Deb	19,052	47.39%	▲2.39
CPI(M)	Hiranmay Narayan Debnath	17,308	43.06%	New
TMP	Ashis Das	2,311	5.75%	New
AITC	Sutapa Ghosh	858	2.13%	▲1.09
NOTA	None of the Above	670	1.67%	▲0.52
Margin of victory		1,744	4.34%	▼0.65
Turnout		40,199	92.21%	▼2.00
Registered electors		43,634		▲8.93
BJP gain from CPI(M)		Swing	▼2.59	

=== 2018 Assembly election ===
2018 Tripura Legislative Assembly election: Kamalasagar
Party	Candidate	Votes	%	±%
CPI(M)	Narayan Chandra Chowdhury	18,847	49.99%	▼6.15
BJP	Arun Bhowmik	16,968	45.00%	▲43.96
NOTA	None of the Above	433	1.15%	New
AITC	Biswanath Ghosh	394	1.04%	New
INC	Sankar Deb	358	0.95%	▼39.84
AMB	Subal Sarkar	248	0.66%	▼0.33
Margin of victory		1,879	4.98%	▼10.36
Turnout		37,705	93.09%	▼0.56
Registered electors		40,056		▲7.48
CPI(M) hold		Swing	▼6.15	

=== 2013 Assembly election ===
2013 Tripura Legislative Assembly election: Kamalasagar
Party	Candidate	Votes	%	±%
CPI(M)	Narayan Chandra Chowdhury	19,808	56.13%	▲3.61
INC	Dipak Kumar Roy	14,393	40.79%	▼3.00
Independent	Sujit Sarkar	371	1.05%	New
BJP	Tulsi Banik	367	1.04%	▼0.21
AMB	Shubhendu Sarkar	349	0.99%	▲0.35
Margin of victory		5,415	15.35%	▲6.61
Turnout		35,288	94.76%	▲0.89
Registered electors		37,268		
CPI(M) hold		Swing	▲3.61	

=== 2008 Assembly election ===
2008 Tripura Legislative Assembly election: Kamalasagar
Party	Candidate	Votes	%	±%
CPI(M)	Narayan Chandra Chowdhury	17,042	52.52%	▼2.35
INC	Matilal Sarkar	14,209	43.79%	▲2.00
BJP	Tulsi Banik	405	1.25%	New
Independent	Babul Sarkar	324	1.00%	New
AITC	Chitta Ranjan Das	262	0.81%	▼0.33
AMB	Subal Sarkar	208	0.64%	▼1.57
Margin of victory		2,833	8.73%	▼4.34
Turnout		32,450	94.13%	▲11.84
Registered electors		34,596		
CPI(M) hold		Swing	▼2.35	

=== 2003 Assembly election ===
2003 Tripura Legislative Assembly election: Kamalasagar
Party	Candidate	Votes	%	±%
CPI(M)	Narayan Chandra Chowdhury	13,936	54.86%	▲5.05
INC	Arun Bhowmik	10,615	41.79%	▼5.23
AMB	Bhuban Bijoy Majumder	562	2.21%	New
AITC	Chitta Ranjan Das	288	1.13%	New
Margin of victory		3,321	13.07%	▲10.28
Turnout		25,401	82.10%	▲0.87
Registered electors		30,992		▲14.78
CPI(M) hold		Swing	▲5.05	

=== 1998 Assembly election ===
1998 Tripura Legislative Assembly election: Kamalasagar
Party	Candidate	Votes	%	±%
CPI(M)	Narayan Chandra Chowdhury	10,907	49.82%	▲4.45
INC	Matilal Sarkar	10,296	47.02%	▼5.50
BJP	Chandan Roy	543	2.48%	▲1.60
Margin of victory		611	2.79%	▼4.37
Turnout		21,895	82.70%	▲2.26
Registered electors		27,001		▲3.39
CPI(M) gain from INC		Swing		

=== 1993 Assembly election ===
1993 Tripura Legislative Assembly election: Kamalasagar
Party	Candidate	Votes	%	±%
INC	Matilal Sarkar	10,813	52.53%	▲5.28
CPI(M)	Narayan Chandra Chowdhury	9,339	45.37%	▼6.14
BJP	Ramesh Das	182	0.88%	New
Margin of victory		1,474	7.16%	▲2.90
Turnout		20,586	80.16%	▼7.19
Registered electors		26,115		▲21.97
INC gain from CPI(M)		Swing		

=== 1988 Assembly election ===
1988 Tripura Legislative Assembly election: Kamalasagar
Party	Candidate	Votes	%	±%
CPI(M)	Matilal Sarkar	9,487	51.51%	▲0.66
INC	Deba Prasad Chowdhury	8,702	47.25%	▼0.72
Independent	Pradip Bikash Roy	229	1.24%	New
Margin of victory		785	4.26%	▲1.38
Turnout		18,418	87.31%	▲2.55
Registered electors		21,411		▲19.57
CPI(M) hold		Swing		

=== 1983 Assembly election ===
1983 Tripura Legislative Assembly election: Kamalasagar
Party	Candidate	Votes	%	±%
CPI(M)	Matilal Sarkar	7,601	50.85%	▼7.27
INC	Monoranjan Laskar	7,170	47.97%	▲33.75
Independent	Harendra Das	177	1.18%	New
Margin of victory		431	2.88%	▼35.01
Turnout		14,948	84.88%	▲4.90
Registered electors		17,907		▲16.16
CPI(M) hold		Swing		

=== 1977 Assembly election ===
1977 Tripura Legislative Assembly election: Kamalasagar
Party	Candidate	Votes	%	±%
CPI(M)	Matilal Sarkar	7,041	58.12%	▲27.19
JP	Manoranjan Laskar	2,451	20.23%	New
INC	Bichitra Mohan Saha	1,722	14.21%	▼38.35
TPCC	Sajal Kanti Laskar	900	7.43%	New
Margin of victory		4,590	37.89%	▲16.26
Turnout		12,114	79.99%	▲5.38
Registered electors		15,416		▲50.69
CPI(M) gain from INC		Swing	▲5.56	

=== 1972 Assembly election ===
1972 Tripura Legislative Assembly election: Kamalasagar
Party	Candidate	Votes	%	±%
INC	Bichitra Mohan Saha	3,936	52.56%	New
CPI(M)	Nagendra Deb	2,316	30.93%	New
Independent	Sajal Kanti Laskar	1,020	13.62%	New
Independent	Hemendra Bijoy Roy	216	2.88%	New
Margin of victory		1,620	21.63%	
Turnout		7,488	75.41%	
Registered electors		10,230		
INC win (new seat)				

== See also ==
- List of constituencies of the Tripura Legislative Assembly
- West Tripura district
- Kamalasagar
- Tripura West (Lok Sabha constituency)
