= Madhab Chandra Saha =

Indian politician from Tripura

Member of the Tripura Legislative Assembly
- Constituency: Matarbari
- In office 1993–1998
- Preceded by: Kashiram Reang
- Succeeded by: Biplab Kumar Ghosh
- In office 2003–2018
- Preceded by: Kashiram Reang
- Succeeded by: Kashiram Reang

Personal details
- Born: April 22, 1951 Udaipur, Tripura
- Died: 21 February 2026 (aged 74)
- Party: Communist Party of India (Marxist)
- Spouse: Bhanu Saha
- Parents: Raimohan Saha (father); Purna Laxmi Saha (mother)
- Education: B. Com
- Alma mater: Maharaja Bir Bikram College
- Occupation: Politician

Madhab Chandra Saha (22 April 1951 - 21 February 2026) was an Indian politician from Tripura. He was a member of the Tripura Legislative Assembly from the Matarbari constituency in Gomati district (formerly South Tripura district).

== Early life ==
Saha was born to Raimohan Saha and Purna Laxmi Saha on 22 April 1952.

== Political career ==
He was first elected as an MLA in the 1993 Tripura Legislative Assembly electionm representing the Communist Party of India (Marxist). In the 1998 Tripura Legislative Assembly election he lost re-election to the Indian National Congress candidate Kashiram Reang. He returned to office in the next three consecutive elections, also on the CPI(M) ticket. He lost to Biplab Kumar Ghosh of the Bharatiya Janata Party in the 2018 Tripura Legislative Assembly election.

== Death ==
Saha died on 21 December 2026 at ILS Hospital Agartala following a long battle with illness.
