= Philip Kumar Reang =

Indian politician from Tripura

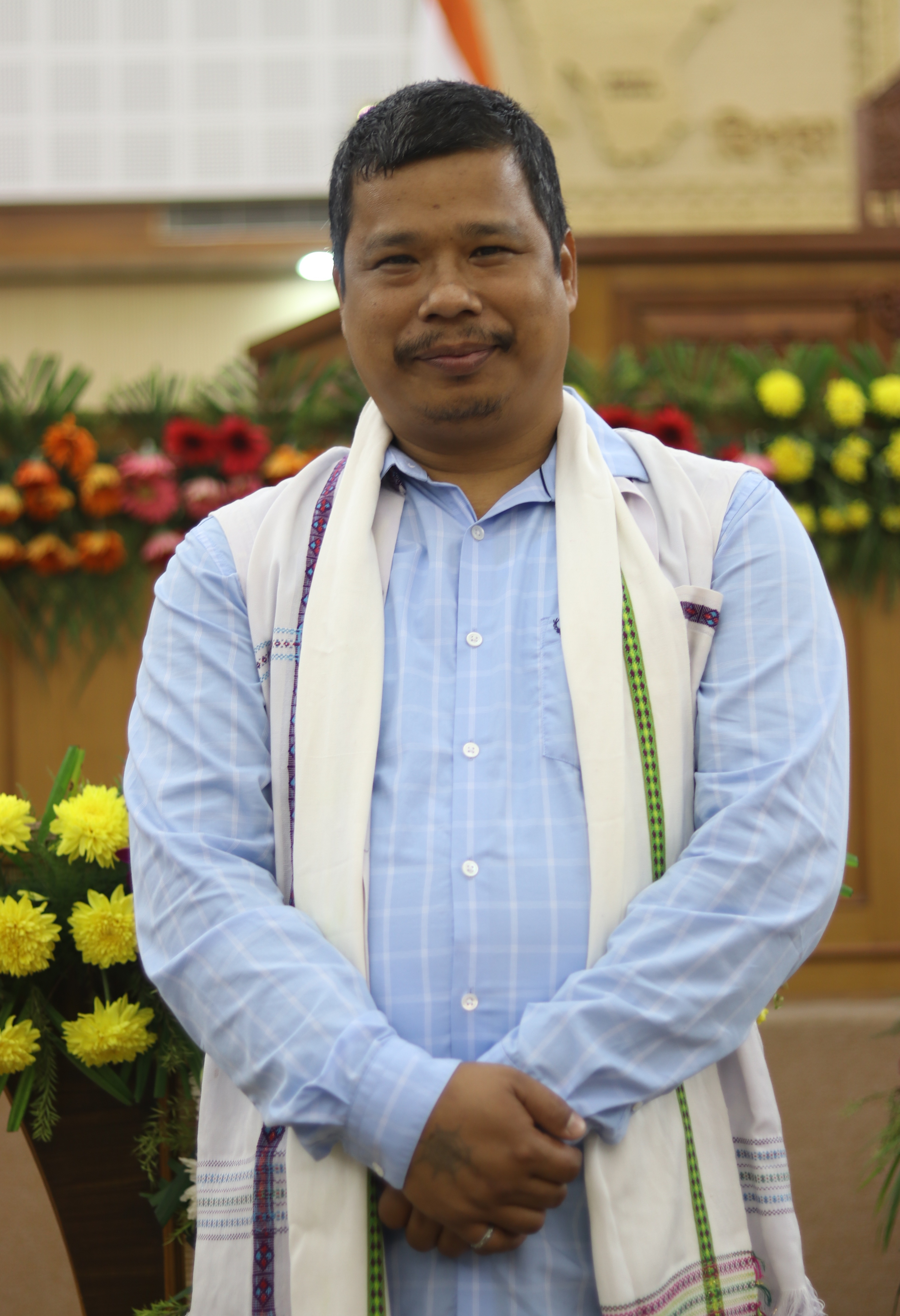
- Philip Kumar Reang at the 13th Tripura Legislative Assembly Swearing-In-Ceremony on March 17, 2023

Member of the Tripura Legislative Assembly
- Incumbent
- Assumed office 2023
- Preceded by: Prem Kumar Reang
- Constituency: Kanchanpur

Personal details
- Born: 22 February 1984 (age 42) Dasda, Kanchanpur
- Party: Tipra Motha Party
- Spouse: Diamonti Reang
- Parent: Drao Kumar Reang

Philip Kumar Reang is an Indian Bru politician from Tripura. In the 2023 Tripura Legislative Assembly election he was elected from the Kanchanpur Assembly constituency and became a member of the Tripura Legislative Assembly.
