= Patna Dental College =

- Minister of Health, Family Welfare & Medical Education, Government of Bihar

Geography
- Location: Ashok Rajpath,, Patna, Bihar, India
- Coordinates: 25°36′28.77″N 85°10′03.06″E

Organisation
- Care system: Public
- Type: General, Teaching, Specialist
- Affiliated university: Bihar University of Health Sciences

Services
- Emergency department: Yes

History
- Founded: 1960; 66 years ago

Links
- Website: http://www.patnadentalcollege.in
- Lists: Hospitals in India

Patna Dental College is an institution for Dental science and is a part of the Bihar University of Health Sciences, Patna, Bihar, India.

== History ==
Patna Dental College was established by the Government of Bihar by Dr R.P. Lall on 9 September 1960 in the premises of Patna Medical College and Hospital.

== Location ==
Presently, the college is situated in the heart of the city on the bank of the river Ganges adjacent to PMCH on main Ashok Rajpath.

== Department ==
- Oral, Medicine & Dental Radiology
- Prosthodontics
- Conservative Dentistry & Endodontics
- Orthodontics
- Periodontics
- Pediatric Dentistry
- Oral Pathology
- Oral Surgery
- Community Dentistry

== Courses ==
- Bachelor of Dental Surgery (BDS)
- Master of Dental Surgery (MDS)

== Alumni ==
- Mansur Ahmad - President of the American Board of Oral and Maxillofacial Radiology (2013), President of the American Academy of Oral and Maxillofacial Radiology (2020), Faculty member at the University of Minnesota.
- Manik Saha - 11th Chief Minister of Tripura.
