= Jharna Das =

Indian politician

Jharna Das Baidya ঝর্ণা দাস বৈদ্য

Member of Parliament, Rajya Sabha
- In office 3 April 2010 – 2 April 2022
- Preceded by: Matilal Sarkar
- Succeeded by: Manik Saha
- Constituency: Tripura

Personal details
- Born: 1 October 1962 (age 63) Mirza, Udaipur, Tripura
- Party: CPI(M)
- Spouse: Kaushik Baidya
- As of 21 November, 2010

Jharna Das is an Indian politician from the Communist Party of India (Marxist). She was a Member of the Parliament of India, representing Tripura in the Rajya Sabha. She was elected unopposed in March 2010. Das is a member of the Tripura State Committee of the CPI(M). Before being elected to parliament, she served as the chairperson of the State Social Welfare Board. Das was the first Dalit to be elected to the Rajya Sabha from Tripura, and the second woman who represented the state in the Rajya Sabha.

On 21 March 2016, Jharna Das Baidya won the biennial Rajya Sabha elections from Tripura by receiving 49 votes, defeating Congress candidate Jyotirmoy Nath, who secured only 10 votes. This was her second term in the Rajya Sabha.
