= Fourth Manik Sarkar ministry =

- Ministry of Tripura
- Date formed: 6 March 2013
- Date dissolved: 9 March 2018

People and organisations
- Head of state: D. Y. Patil (Governor)
- Head of government: Manik Sarkar (Chief Minister)
- No. of ministers: 12
- Member parties: CPI(M); CPI
- Status in legislature: Majority
- Opposition party: INC
- Opposition leader: Ratan Lal Nath

History
- Election: 2013
- Legislature term: 5 years
- Predecessor: Sarkar III
- Successor: Deb

Manik Sarkar was sworn in as Chief Minister of Tripura on 6 March 2013. Here is the list of ministers:

== Cabinet ministers ==
Ministers sworn on 6 March 2013:

Sno.	Name	Office	Portfolio	Took Office	Left Office
1	Manik Sarkar	Chief Minister	Home (excluding Jail & Fire Services); Planning and Co-ordination; Land and Land Reforms; GA (Excluding Printing and Stationery); Other departments not allocated to any minister	6 March 2013	
2	Aghore Debbarma	Cabinet Minister	Agriculture; Tribal Welfare (Excluding TRP, PTG); Animal Resource Development	6 March 2013	
3	Badal Choudhury	Cabinet Minister	Health & Family Welfare; Revenue and Public Works(Excluding Drinking water and sanitation)	6 March 2013	
4	Tapan Chakraborty	Cabinet Minister	Education (School & Higher); Industries & Commerce (including IT) and Law; Finance	6 March 2013	
5	Manik Dey	Cabinet Minister	Power; Urban Development; Rural Development(Panchayat); Transport	6 March 2013	
6	Khagendra Jamatia	Cabinet Minister	Co-operation; Fisheries and Home (Fire service)	6 March 2013	
7	Manindra Reang	Cabinet Minister	Tribal Welfare(TRP & PTG); Home(Jail); GA(Printing and Stationery)	6 March 2013	
8	Bijita Nath	Cabinet Minister	Social Welfare & Social Education; Welfare of OBC and Science; Technology and Environment	6 March 2013	
9	Sahid Choudhuri	Cabinet Minister	Minority Development; Labour and Education(Sports and Youth Affairs)	6 March 2013	
10	Bhanu Lal Saha	Cabinet Minister	Finance; Food; Civil supplies and Consumers Affaires; Information and Cultural Affairs	6 March 2013	
11	Ratan Bhowmik	Cabinet Minister	Welfare of Scheduled Cast; Public Works (Drinking Water and Sanitation); Tourism	6 March 2013	
12	Naresh Chandra Jamatia	Cabinet Minister	Forest; Rural Development (excluding Panchayat); Election	6 March 2013	
