= Abhishek Debroy =

Indian politician (born 1982)

Member of Tripura Legislative Assembly
- Incumbent
- Assumed office 2 March 2023
- Preceded by: Biplab Kumar Ghosh
- Constituency: Matarbari

President of Bharatiya Janata Party, Tripura
- Incumbent
- Assumed office 28 May 2026
- Preceded by: Rajib Bhattacharjee

Personal details
- Party: Bharatiya Janata Party

Abhishek Debroy (born 1982) is an Indian politician from Tripura. He is a member of the Tripura Legislative Assembly from the Matarbari Assembly constituency in Gomati district. He was first elected in the 2023 Tripura Legislative Assembly election, representing the Bharatiya Janata Party. He is currently serving as the State President of Bhartiya Janata Party in Tripura.

== Early life and education ==
Debroy is from Kakraban, Gomati district, Tripura. He is the son of Himangshu Debroy. He completed his bachelor's degree in Pharmacy in 2020 at Rajiv Gandhi University of Health Sciences, Karnataka.

== Career ==
Debroy was elected from the Matarbari Assembly constituency representing the Bharatiya Janata Party in the 2023 Tripura Legislative Assembly election. He polled 25,494 votes with a vote share percentage of 51.06 and defeated his nearest rival, Pranajit Roy of the Indian National Congress, by a margin of 9,041 votes.
