= List of Tripura ministries =

This is a list of the state cabinets of Tripura from the independence to the present day.

== List ==
#	Ministry	From	To	Election	Party	Source
1	Singh I	1963	1967	1962	INC	
2	Singh II	1967	1971	1967	INC	
3	Sengupta	1972	1977	1972	INC	
4	Das	1977	1977	1972	CFD	
5	Gupta	1977	1977	1972	JP	
6	Chakraborty I	1978	1983	1977	CPI(M)	
7	Chakraborty II	1983	1988	1983	CPI(M)	
8	Majumdar	1988	1992	1988	INC	
9	Barman	1992	1993	1988	INC	
10	Dasarath	1993	1998	1993	CPI(M)	
11	Sarkar I	1998	2003	1998	CPI(M)	
12	Sarkar II	2003	2008	2003	CPI(M)	
13	Sarkar III	2008	2013	2008	CPI(M)	
14	Sarkar IV	2013	2018	2013	CPI(M)	
15	Biplab	2018	2022	2018	BJP	
16	Saha I	2022	2023	2018	BJP	
17	Saha II	2023	-	2023	BJP	

== See also ==
- Chief Minister of Tripura
