= Durbajoy Reang =

Indian politician

Durbajoy Reang was an Indian politician and a leader of the Communist Party of India. He was a member of the Tripura Legislative Assembly, representing the Santirbazar constituency from 1998 to 2003.
