= Gachirampara =

Village in Tripura, India

- Village
- Location within Tripura Location within India
- Coordinates: 23°53′55″N 92°12′38″E
- Country: India
- State: Tripura
- District: North Tripura
- Block: Dasda
- Elevation: 93 m (305 ft)

Population (2011)
  - Total: 21,601
- Time zone: UTC+5:30 (IST)
- PIN: 799271

Gachirampara is a village in Dasda Block, North Tripura District, Tripura, India. It borders Dasda Laxmipur to the north, Paschim Tlangsanbari (Part) to the east, Lambachhara to the south, and Ramprasaipara to the west. In the year 2011, it has a total population of 21,601.

== Geography ==
Gachirampara is located in the eastern portion of Tripura, about 54 kilometres south of the district capital Dharmanagar and 17 kilometres southeast of the block capital Dasda. Its average elevation is at 93 metres above the sea level.

== Climate ==
Gachirampara belongs to the Humid Subtropical Climate (Cwa). Its driest month is January, which sees on average 11 mm of rainfall; and the wettest month is May, which sees on average 312 mm of rainfall.

Climate data for Gachirampara
Month	Jan	Feb	Mar	Apr	May	Jun	Jul	Aug	Sep	Oct	Nov	Dec	Year
Mean daily maximum °C (°F)	23.8 (74.8)	27.1 (80.8)	30.6 (87.1)	31.7 (89.1)	31 (88)	29.9 (85.8)	29.2 (84.6)	29.4 (84.9)	29.3 (84.7)	28.7 (83.7)	26.7 (80.1)	24.2 (75.6)	28.5 (83.3)
Daily mean °C (°F)	17.6 (63.7)	20.5 (68.9)	24.1 (75.4)	26.1 (79.0)	26.4 (79.5)	26.3 (79.3)	26 (79)	26.1 (79.0)	25.8 (78.4)	24.6 (76.3)	21.6 (70.9)	18.5 (65.3)	23.6 (74.6)
Mean daily minimum °C (°F)	11.6 (52.9)	14.2 (57.6)	18 (64)	21.6 (70.9)	23.1 (73.6)	24 (75)	24 (75)	23.9 (75.0)	23.4 (74.1)	21.5 (70.7)	16.8 (62.2)	13 (55)	19.6 (67.2)
Average rainfall mm (inches)	11 (0.4)	37 (1.5)	116 (4.6)	191 (7.5)	312 (12.3)	294 (11.6)	280 (11.0)	266 (10.5)	272 (10.7)	175 (6.9)	45 (1.8)	14 (0.6)	2,013 (79.4)
Source: Climate-Data.org

== Demographics ==
As of 2011, there are 3,870 households and 21,601 residents within the village. Out of the total population, 10,870 are male and 10,731 are female. The literacy rate is at 34.87%, with 4,726 of the males and 2,806 of the females being literate. The village's census location code is 272727.
