= Bindu Debnath =

Indian politician

Bindu Debnath is an Indian politician from Bharatiya Janata Party who is serving as a member of Tripura Legislative Assembly from the Dhanpur Assembly constituency.
