= Dhanpur Assembly constituency =

Legislative Assembly constituency in Tripura State, India

Coordinates: 23.43°N 91.29°E

Dhanpur
- Constituency No. 23 for the Tripura Legislative Assembly

Constituency details
- Country: India
- Region: Northeast India
- State: Tripura
- District: Sipahijala
- Lok Sabha constituency: Tripura West
- Established: 1972
- Total electors: 50,223
- Reservation: None

Member of Legislative Assembly
- 13th Tripura Legislative Assembly
- Incumbent Bindu Debnath
- Party: Bharatiya Janata Party
- Elected year: 2023

Dhanpur is one of the 60 Legislative Assembly constituencies of Tripura state in India. It is in Sipahijala district and is also part of West Tripura Lok Sabha constituency.

== Members of the Legislative Assembly ==
Election	Member	Party
1972	Samar Chowdhury	Communist Party of India (Marxist)
1977	Samar Chowdhury	Communist Party of India (Marxist)
1983	Samar Chowdhury	Communist Party of India (Marxist)
1988	Samar Chowdhury	Communist Party of India (Marxist)
1993	Samar Chowdhury	Communist Party of India (Marxist)
1998	Manik Sarkar	Communist Party of India (Marxist)
2003	Manik Sarkar	Communist Party of India (Marxist)
2008	Manik Sarkar	Communist Party of India (Marxist)
2013	Manik Sarkar	Communist Party of India (Marxist)
2018	Manik Sarkar	Communist Party of India (Marxist)
2023	Pratima Bhoumik	Bharatiya Janata Party
2023 by-election	Bindu Debnath	Bharatiya Janata Party

== Election results ==
=== 2023 Assembly by-election ===
2023 Tripura Legislative Assembly by-election: Dhanpur
Party	Candidate	Votes	%	±%
BJP	Bindu Debnath	30,017	71.24%	▲28.99
CPI(M)	Kaushik Chanda	11,146	26.45%	▼8.08
Independent	Anil Reang	544	1.29%	New
NOTA	None of the Above	533	1.27%	▲0.08
Independent	Bappi Debnath	426	1.01%	New
Margin of victory		18,871	44.79%	▲37.07
Turnout		42,133	84.64%	▼6.68
Registered electors		50,427		▲0.41
BJP hold		Swing	▲28.99	

=== 2023 Assembly election ===
2023 Tripura Legislative Assembly election: Dhanpur
Party	Candidate	Votes	%	±%
BJP	Pratima Bhoumik	19,148	42.25%	▲1.18
CPI(M)	Kaushik Chanda	15,648	34.53%	▼19.9
TMP	Amiya Dayal Noatia	8,671	19.13%	New
AITC	Habil Mia	651	1.44%	▲0.47
NOTA	None of the Above	538	1.19%	New
Independent	Rakesh Sukla Das	405	0.89%	New
Independent	Bappi Debnath	258	0.57%	New
Margin of victory		3,500	7.72%	▼5.63
Turnout		45,319	90.28%	▼2.65
Registered electors		50,223		▲14.50
BJP gain from CPI(M)		Swing	▼12.18	

=== 2018 Assembly election ===
2018 Tripura Legislative Assembly election: Dhanpur
Party	Candidate	Votes	%	±%
CPI(M)	Manik Sarkar	22,176	54.43%	▼2.67
BJP	Pratima Bhoumik	16,735	41.08%	▲39.14
INC	Laxmi Nag ( Barman)	832	2.04%	▼38.92
NOTA	None of the Above	465	1.14%	New
AITC	Jahir Uddin	392	0.96%	New
Margin of victory		5,441	13.36%	▼2.79
Turnout		40,741	92.62%	▼3.15
Registered electors		43,863		
CPI(M) hold		Swing	▼2.67	

=== 2013 Assembly election ===
2013 Tripura Legislative Assembly election: Dhanpur
Party	Candidate	Votes	%	±%
CPI(M)	Manik Sarkar	21,286	57.10%	▲4.20
INC	Shah Alam	15,269	40.96%	▼3.36
BJP	Abul Kalam	721	1.93%	New
Margin of victory		6,017	16.14%	▲7.56
Turnout		37,276	96.07%	▲1.38
Registered electors		38,818		
CPI(M) hold		Swing		

=== 2008 Assembly election ===
2008 Tripura Legislative Assembly election: Dhanpur
Party	Candidate	Votes	%	±%
CPI(M)	Manik Sarkar	17,992	52.91%	▼2.94
INC	Shah Alam	15,074	44.32%	▲4.58
Independent	Naidar Basi Tripura	525	1.54%	New
AITC	Ashish Chakraborty	417	1.23%	New
Margin of victory		2,918	8.58%	▼7.52
Turnout		34,008	94.83%	▲10.48
Registered electors		35,933		▲8.18
CPI(M) hold		Swing	▼2.94	

=== 2003 Assembly election ===
2003 Tripura Legislative Assembly election: Dhanpur
Party	Candidate	Votes	%	±%
CPI(M)	Manik Sarkar	15,613	55.85%	▲1.94
INC	Dipak Chakraborty	11,111	39.74%	▼1.06
Independent	Manoranjan Das	681	2.44%	New
BJP	Pratima Bhoumik	551	1.97%	▼3.32
Margin of victory		4,502	16.10%	▲3.01
Turnout		27,956	84.23%	▼0.29
Registered electors		33,216		▲18.41
CPI(M) hold		Swing	▲1.94	

=== 1998 Assembly election ===
1998 Tripura Legislative Assembly election: Dhanpur
Party	Candidate	Votes	%	±%
CPI(M)	Manik Sarkar	12,771	53.90%	▼4.52
INC	Majibur Islam Majumder	9,668	40.81%	▲0.42
BJP	Pratima Bhoumik	1,253	5.29%	New
Margin of victory		3,103	13.10%	▼4.94
Turnout		23,692	86.38%	▲0.84
Registered electors		28,052		▲2.84
CPI(M) hold		Swing		

=== 1993 Assembly election ===
1993 Tripura Legislative Assembly election: Dhanpur
Party	Candidate	Votes	%	±%
CPI(M)	Samar Chowdhury	13,327	58.43%	▲3.98
INC	Gopal Chandra Roy	9,212	40.39%	▼4.15
Margin of victory		4,115	18.04%	▲8.14
Turnout		22,809	84.55%	▼6.12
Registered electors		27,277		▲23.29
CPI(M) hold		Swing		

=== 1988 Assembly election ===
1988 Tripura Legislative Assembly election: Dhanpur
Party	Candidate	Votes	%	±%
CPI(M)	Samar Chowdhury	10,809	54.45%	▲0.43
INC	Prabir Kumar Pul	8,843	44.54%	▼1.44
Independent	Narayan Nath Sarker	148	0.75%	New
Margin of victory		1,966	9.90%	▲1.87
Turnout		19,853	91.09%	▲1.96
Registered electors		22,124		▲19.27
CPI(M) hold		Swing		

=== 1983 Assembly election ===
1983 Tripura Legislative Assembly election: Dhanpur
Party	Candidate	Votes	%	±%
CPI(M)	Samar Chowdhury	8,795	54.02%	▲5.23
INC	Brajendra Kumar Ghosh	7,487	45.98%	▲22.27
Margin of victory		1,308	8.03%	▼16.53
Turnout		16,282	89.26%	▲6.33
Registered electors		18,550		▲18.06
CPI(M) hold		Swing	▲5.23	

=== 1977 Assembly election ===
1977 Tripura Legislative Assembly election: Dhanpur
Party	Candidate	Votes	%	±%
CPI(M)	Samar Chowdhury	6,244	48.79%	▲0.15
JP	Brojendra Ghosh	3,100	24.22%	New
INC	Dhirendra Kumar Sengupta	3,035	23.71%	▼14.27
TPCC	Birendra Kumar Ghosh	253	1.98%	New
TUS	Vim Chandra Tripura	166	1.30%	New
Margin of victory		3,144	24.57%	▲13.92
Turnout		12,798	83.08%	▲16.04
Registered electors		15,713		▲41.61
CPI(M) hold		Swing	▲0.15	

=== 1972 Assembly election ===
1972 Tripura Legislative Assembly election: Dhanpur
Party	Candidate	Votes	%	±%
CPI(M)	Samar Chowdhury	3,530	48.64%	New
INC	Dhirendra Kumar Sengupta	2,757	37.99%	New
Independent	Birendra Ghosh	971	13.38%	New
Margin of victory		773	10.65%	
Turnout		7,258	67.66%	
Registered electors		11,096		
CPI(M) win (new seat)				

== See also ==
- List of constituencies of the Tripura Legislative Assembly
- Sipahijala district
- Tripura West (Lok Sabha constituency)
