= Rajendra Reang (Tripura politician) =

Indian politician

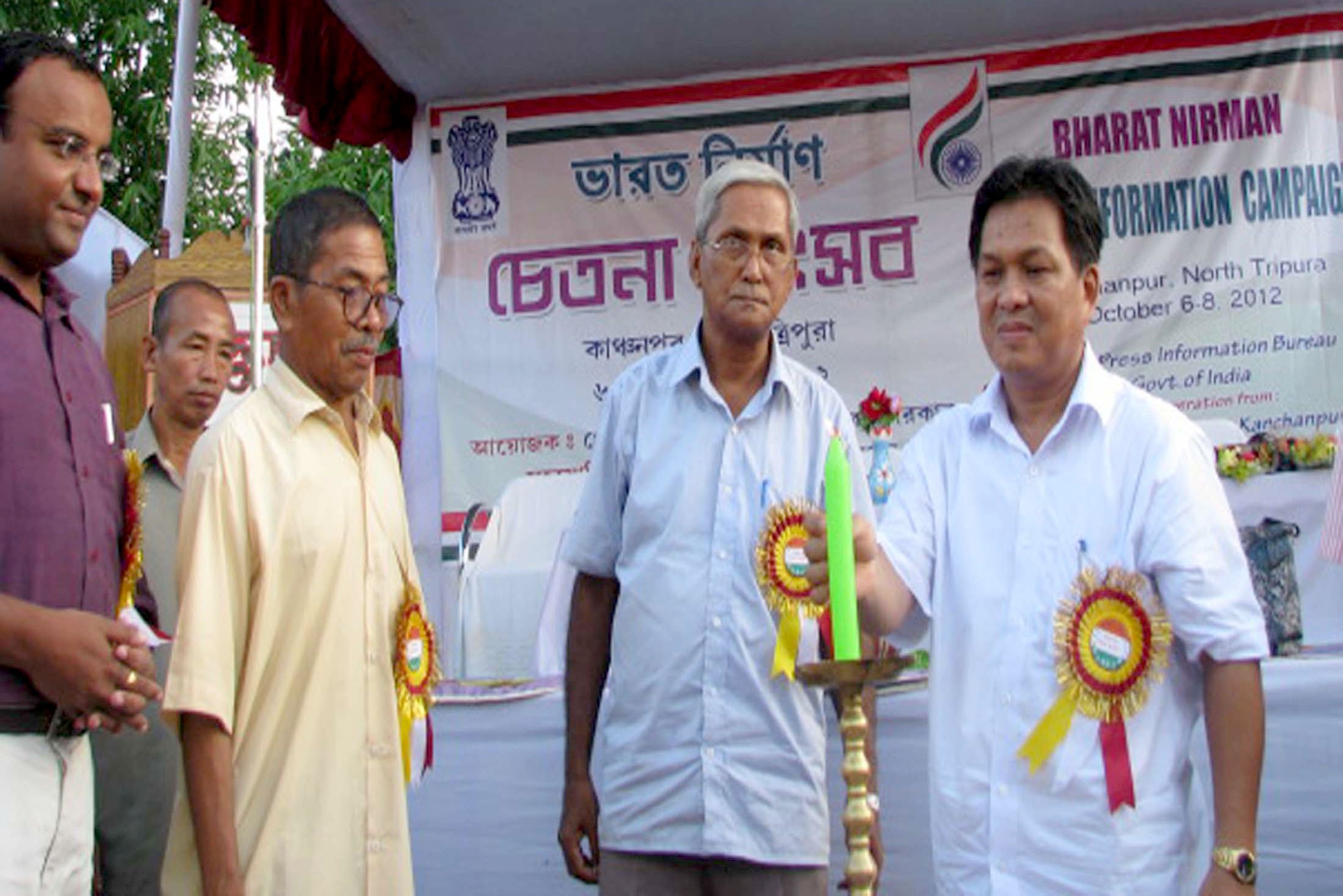

Member of Tripura Legislative Assembly
- In office 2003–2018
- Preceded by: Binduram Reang
- Succeeded by: Prem Kumar Reang
- Constituency: Kanchanpur

Personal details
- Born: 2 January 1962 (age 64) Kanchanpura, North Tripura
- Citizenship: India
- Party: CPI(M)
- Spouse: Joyabati Reang

Rajendra Reang is an Indian politician and member of the Communist Party of India (Marxist). He was a former member of Tripura Legislative Assembly from 2003 to 2018 from the Kanchanpur constituency. In the 2018 Tripura Legislative Assembly election Rajendra was defeated by the IPFT candidate Prem Kumar Reang by a margin of 4131 votes.

== Political career ==
In the year 1974, he joined the Students' Federation of India and became involved as an activist in the students' movement. In 1995 he joined the Tribal Youth Federation. He currently serves as a Central Committee member of Ganamukti Parishad.
