= Kanchanpur Assembly constituency =

Legislative Assembly constituency in Tripura State, India

Coordinates: 23.77°N 92.22°E

Kanchanpur
- Constituency No. 60 for the Tripura Legislative Assembly

Constituency details
- Country: India
- Region: Northeast India
- State: Tripura
- District: North Tripura
- Lok Sabha constituency: Tripura East
- Established: 1967
- Total electors: 50,748
- Reservation: ST

Member of Legislative Assembly
- 13th Tripura Legislative Assembly
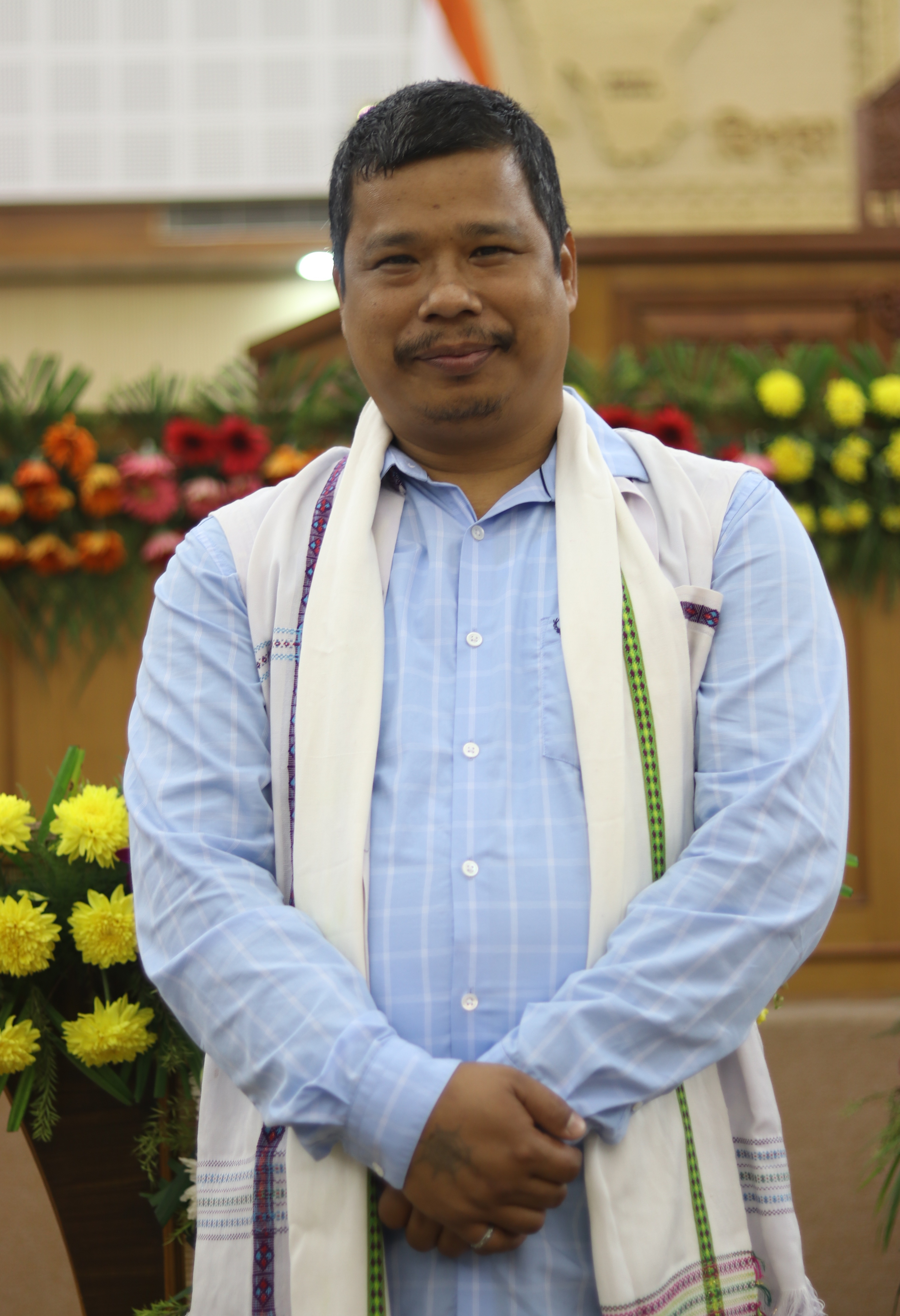
- Incumbent Philip Kumar Reang
- Party: TMP
- Alliance: NDA
- Elected year: 2023

Kanchanpur is one of the 60 Legislative Assembly constituencies of Tripura state in India.

It is part of North Tripura district and is reserved for candidates belonging to the Scheduled Tribes.

== Members of the Legislative Assembly ==
Election	Member	Party
1967	R. P. Chowdhury	Indian National Congress
1972	Raimuni Reang Chowdhury	Indian National Congress
1977	Mandida Reang	Communist Party of India
1983	Len Prasad Malsai	Communist Party of India
1988	Drao Kumar Reang	Tripura Upajati Juba Samiti
1993	Len Prasad Malsai	Communist Party of India
1998	Binduram Reang	Communist Party of India
2003	Rajendra Reang	Communist Party of India
2008	Rajendra Reang	Communist Party of India
2013	Rajendra Reang	Communist Party of India
2018	Prem Kumar Reang	Indigenous People's Front of Tripura
2023	Philip Kumar Reang	Tipra Motha Party

== Election results ==
=== 2023 Assembly election ===
2023 Tripura Legislative Assembly election: Kanchanpur
Party	Candidate	Votes	%	±%
TMP	Philip Kumar Reang	15,413	36.44%	New
CPI(M)	Rajendra Reang	10,522	24.88%	▼15.89
Independent	Bimanjoy Reang	10,014	23.68%	New
IPFT	Prem Kumar Reang	3,445	8.15%	▼43.61
Tipraland State Party	Shankar Reang	1,454	3.44%	▲2.71
Independent	Indrakhela Chakma	796	1.88%	New
NOTA	None of the Above	651	1.54%	▲0.62
Margin of victory		4,891	11.56%	▲0.57
Turnout		42,295	83.43%	▼6.06
Registered electors		50,748		▲20.75
TMP gain from IPFT		Swing	▼15.31	

=== 2018 Assembly election ===
2018 Tripura Legislative Assembly election: Kanchanpur
Party	Candidate	Votes	%	±%
IPFT	Prem Kumar Reang	19,448	51.76%	New
CPI(M)	Rajendra Reang	15,317	40.76%	▼9.37
INPT	Sindrai Reang	856	2.28%	▼44.70
AMB	Karnadhan Chakma	400	1.06%	New
INC	Ranjit Kumar Reang	386	1.03%	New
NOTA	None of the Above	347	0.92%	New
Tipraland State Party	Pronendra Reang	272	0.72%	New
Margin of victory		4,131	10.99%	▲7.84
Turnout		37,576	88.18%	▼1.06
Registered electors		42,028		▲10.91
IPFT gain from CPI(M)		Swing	▲1.63	

=== 2013 Assembly election ===
2013 Tripura Legislative Assembly election: Kanchanpur
Party	Candidate	Votes	%	±%
CPI(M)	Rajendra Reang	17,186	50.13%	▲2.07
INPT	Drao Kumar Reang	16,105	46.98%	New
BJP	Upendra Reang	992	2.89%	▲1.02
Margin of victory		1,081	3.15%	▲1.42
Turnout		34,283	90.59%	▲1.98
Registered electors		37,895		
CPI(M) hold		Swing		

=== 2008 Assembly election ===
2008 Tripura Legislative Assembly election: Kanchanpur
Party	Candidate	Votes	%	±%
CPI(M)	Rajendra Reang (Tripura politician)	13,952	48.06%	▲3.69
INC	Sanjit Kumar Reang	13,449	46.33%	New
Independent	Binoy Reang	689	2.37%	New
BJP	Upendra Reang	543	1.87%	▼7.32
AMB	Karnadhan Chakma	397	1.37%	New
Margin of victory		503	1.73%	▲1.73
Turnout		29,030	88.57%	▲24.29
Registered electors		32,807		
CPI(M) hold		Swing	▲3.69	

=== 2003 Assembly election ===
2003 Tripura Legislative Assembly election: Kanchanpur
Party	Candidate	Votes	%	±%
CPI(M)	Rajendra Reang (Tripura politician)	9,700	44.37%	▼0.41
INPT	Rajendra Reang	9,699	44.36%	New
BJP	Rang Rung Reang	2,009	9.19%	▼14.76
NCP	Nibedan Reang	454	2.08%	New
Margin of victory		1	0.00%	▼20.83
Turnout		21,862	64.25%	▼3.54
Registered electors		34,056		▲15.44
CPI(M) hold		Swing	▼0.41	

=== 1998 Assembly election ===
1998 Tripura Legislative Assembly election: Kanchanpur
Party	Candidate	Votes	%	±%
CPI(M)	Binduram Reang	8,948	44.78%	▼2.18
BJP	Nanjira Reang	4,785	23.95%	▲22.55
Independent	Kartik Kumar Kalai	3,490	17.46%	New
Independent	Anekroy Reang	2,346	11.74%	New
AMB	Samarendra Chakma	414	2.07%	▼15.89
Margin of victory		4,163	20.83%	▲3.13
Turnout		19,983	69.80%	▼4.98
Registered electors		29,500		▲9.15
CPI(M) hold		Swing	▼2.18	

=== 1993 Assembly election ===
1993 Tripura Legislative Assembly election: Kanchanpur
Party	Candidate	Votes	%	±%
CPI(M)	Len Prasad Malsai	9,228	46.95%	▲8.70
TUS	Drao Kumar Reang	5,749	29.25%	▼10.18
AMB	Minati Roy	3,531	17.97%	New
Independent	Lalrianpula Maisoy (Reang)	598	3.04%	New
BJP	Ambika Reang	275	1.40%	New
Independent	Swapan Mitra Talukdar	246	1.25%	New
Margin of victory		3,479	17.70%	▲16.52
Turnout		19,653	73.79%	▼1.55
Registered electors		27,027		▲22.59
CPI(M) gain from TUS		Swing	▲7.52	

=== 1988 Assembly election ===
1988 Tripura Legislative Assembly election: Kanchanpur
Party	Candidate	Votes	%	±%
TUS	Drao Kumar Reang	6,457	39.44%	▲8.59
CPI(M)	Len Prasad Malsai	6,263	38.25%	▼4.96
Independent	Sudhangshu Sen	3,653	22.31%	New
Margin of victory		194	1.18%	▼11.17
Turnout		16,373	75.72%	▲2.60
Registered electors		22,046		▲12.81
TUS gain from CPI(M)		Swing		

=== 1983 Assembly election ===
1983 Tripura Legislative Assembly election: Kanchanpur
Party	Candidate	Votes	%	±%
CPI(M)	Len Prasad Malsai	6,052	43.21%	▼12.60
TUS	Drao Kumar Reang	4,321	30.85%	▲10.83
Independent	Sudhangshu Sen	3,524	25.16%	New
Independent	Ratna Prava Das	109	0.78%	New
Margin of victory		1,731	12.36%	▼23.43
Turnout		14,006	72.88%	▲7.82
Registered electors		19,543		▲24.18
CPI(M) hold		Swing	▼12.60	

=== 1977 Assembly election ===
1977 Tripura Legislative Assembly election: Kanchanpur
Party	Candidate	Votes	%	±%
CPI(M)	Mandida Reang	5,608	55.81%	▲23.90
TUS	Sukadayal Jamatia	2,012	20.02%	▲7.25
JP	Suriya Kumar Reang	1,437	14.30%	New
TPCC	Sonatan Reang	513	5.11%	New
INC	Benoy Kumar Chakma	478	4.76%	▼41.91
Margin of victory		3,596	35.79%	▲21.04
Turnout		10,048	65.06%	▲16.14
Registered electors		15,738		▲12.09
CPI(M) gain from INC		Swing	▲9.15	

=== 1972 Assembly election ===
1972 Tripura Legislative Assembly election: Kanchanpur
Party	Candidate	Votes	%	±%
INC	Raimuni Reang Chowdhury	3,126	46.66%	▼17.96
CPI(M)	Len Prasad Reang	2,138	31.92%	▲0.98
TUS	Drao Kumar Reang	856	12.78%	New
AIFB	Lianzdala	579	8.64%	New
Margin of victory		988	14.75%	▼18.95
Turnout		6,699	48.99%	▼7.26
Registered electors		14,041		▼3.93
INC hold		Swing	▼17.96	

=== 1967 Assembly election ===
1967 Tripura Legislative Assembly election: Kanchanpur
Party	Candidate	Votes	%	±%
INC	R. P. Chowdhury	5,192	64.63%	New
CPI(M)	Mandida Reang	2,485	30.93%	New
Independent	Benoy Kumar Chakma	357	4.44%	New
Margin of victory		2,707	33.69%	
Turnout		8,034	57.06%	
Registered electors		14,615		
INC win (new seat)				

== See also ==
- List of constituencies of the Tripura Legislative Assembly
- North Tripura district
