= Santirbazar Assembly constituency =

Legislative Assembly constituency in Tripura state, India

Coordinates: 23.31°N 91.55°E

Santirbazar
- Constituency No. 36 for the Tripura Legislative Assembly

Constituency details
- Country: India
- Region: Northeast India
- State: Tripura
- District: South Tripura
- Lok Sabha constituency: Tripura West
- Established: 1977
- Total electors: 50,535
- Reservation: ST

Member of Legislative Assembly
- 13th Tripura Legislative Assembly
- Incumbent Pramod Reang
- Party: Bharatiya Janata Party
- Elected year: 2023

Santirbazar is one of the 60 Legislative Assembly constituencies of Tripura state in India.

It is part of South Tripura district and is reserved for candidates belonging to the Scheduled Tribes.

== Members of the Legislative Assembly ==
Election	Member	Party
1977	Drao Kumar Reang	Tripura Upajati Juba Samiti
1983	Shyama Charan Tripura	Tripura Upajati Juba Samiti
1988	Gouri Sankar Reang	Tripura Upajati Juba Samiti
1993	Baju Ban Riyan	Communist Party of India
1998	Durbajoy Reang	Communist Party of India
2003	Manindra Reang	Communist Party of India
2008	Manindra Reang	Communist Party of India
2013	Manindra Reang	Communist Party of India
2018	Pramod Reang	Bharatiya Janata Party
2023	Pramod Reang	Bharatiya Janata Party

== Election results ==
=== 2023 Assembly election ===
2023 Tripura Legislative Assembly election: Santirbazar
Party	Candidate	Votes	%	±%
BJP	Pramod Reang	18,709	40.04%	▼10.83
TMP	Harendra Reang	14,615	31.28%	New
CPI	Satyajit Reang	12,063	25.82%	▼19.55
AITC	Narendra Reang	697	1.49%	New
NOTA	None of the Above	636	1.36%	▲0.10
Margin of victory		4,094	8.76%	▲3.26
Turnout		46,720	92.50%	▼1.03
Registered electors		50,535		▲10.76
BJP hold		Swing	▼10.83	

=== 2018 Assembly election ===
2018 Tripura Legislative Assembly election: Santirbazar
Party	Candidate	Votes	%	±%
BJP	Pramod Reang	21,701	50.88%	▲49.32
CPI	Manindra Reang	19,352	45.37%	▼7.49
NOTA	None of the Above	538	1.26%	New
INC	Baneti Reang	446	1.05%	▼42.27
Independent	Milan Pada Murasing	313	0.73%	New
Margin of victory		2,349	5.51%	▼4.04
Turnout		42,652	93.22%	▼1.27
Registered electors		45,627		▲9.89
BJP gain from CPI		Swing	▼1.99	

=== 2013 Assembly election ===
2013 Tripura Legislative Assembly election: Santirbazar
Party	Candidate	Votes	%	±%
CPI	Manindra Reang	20,798	52.87%	▲0.06
INC	Gouri Sankar Reang	17,042	43.32%	▼1.48
IPFT	Rana Kishore Reang	888	2.26%	New
BJP	Parikshit Debbarma	613	1.56%	▼0.83
Margin of victory		3,756	9.55%	▲1.54
Turnout		39,341	94.88%	▲1.21
Registered electors		41,521		
CPI hold		Swing	▲0.06	

=== 2008 Assembly election ===
2008 Tripura Legislative Assembly election: Santirbazar
Party	Candidate	Votes	%	±%
CPI	Manindra Reang	18,345	52.81%	▼0.23
INC	Gouri Sankar Reang	15,562	44.80%	New
BJP	Parikshit Debbarma	831	2.39%	▼0.39
Margin of victory		2,783	8.01%	▼0.86
Turnout		34,738	93.86%	▲13.23
Registered electors		37,136		
CPI hold		Swing		

=== 2003 Assembly election ===
2003 Tripura Legislative Assembly election: Santirbazar
Party	Candidate	Votes	%	±%
CPI	Manindra Reang	14,536	53.04%	▲5.19
INPT	Rana Kishore Reang	12,106	44.17%	New
BJP	Rabindra Reang	763	2.78%	▼1.88
Margin of victory		2,430	8.87%	▲8.50
Turnout		27,405	80.38%	▼0.63
Registered electors		34,121		▲10.29
CPI hold		Swing		

=== 1998 Assembly election ===
1998 Tripura Legislative Assembly election: Santirbazar
Party	Candidate	Votes	%	±%
CPI	Durbajoy Reang	11,983	47.85%	New
TUS	Gauri Sankar Reang	11,890	47.48%	▼1.59
BJP	Pabitra Kumar Reang	1,169	4.67%	New
Margin of victory		93	0.37%	▼1.01
Turnout		25,042	83.44%	▼0.31
Registered electors		30,937		▼4.21
CPI gain from CPI(M)		Swing		

=== 1993 Assembly election ===
1993 Tripura Legislative Assembly election: Santirbazar
Party	Candidate	Votes	%	±%
CPI(M)	Baju Ban Riyan	13,242	50.46%	▲3.56
TUS	Gouri Sankar Reang	12,879	49.07%	▼2.81
Margin of victory		363	1.38%	▼3.60
Turnout		26,244	82.16%	▼2.57
Registered electors		32,298		▲21.28
CPI(M) gain from TUS		Swing		

=== 1988 Assembly election ===
1988 Tripura Legislative Assembly election: Santirbazar
Party	Candidate	Votes	%	±%
TUS	Gouri Sankar Reang	11,582	51.88%	▼3.75
CPI(M)	Manik Majumder	10,470	46.90%	▲5.71
Independent	Madan Baidya	272	1.22%	New
Margin of victory		1,112	4.98%	▼9.45
Turnout		22,324	84.96%	▲1.18
Registered electors		26,630		▲16.85
TUS hold		Swing		

=== 1983 Assembly election ===
1983 Tripura Legislative Assembly election: Santirbazar
Party	Candidate	Votes	%	±%
TUS	Shyama Charan Tripura	10,478	55.63%	▲25.55
CPI(M)	Narayan Chandra Kar	7,759	41.19%	▲14.50
Independent	Manindra Kumar Das	598	3.17%	New
Margin of victory		2,719	14.44%	▲11.05
Turnout		18,835	83.85%	▲5.87
Registered electors		22,790		▲19.68
TUS hold		Swing		

=== 1977 Assembly election ===
1977 Tripura Legislative Assembly election: Santirbazar
Party	Candidate	Votes	%	±%
TUS	Drao Kumar Reang	4,397	30.08%	New
CPI(M)	Subodh Chandra Nath	3,902	26.69%	New
INC	Pijush Biswas	2,947	20.16%	New
JP	Lakshmi Nag ( Barman )	1,725	11.80%	New
TPCC	Sachindra Majumder	608	4.16%	New
CPI	Sunil Baran Das Gupta	594	4.06%	New
Independent	Anil Chandra Biswas	446	3.05%	New
Margin of victory		495	3.39%	
Turnout		14,619	78.29%	
Registered electors		19,042		
TUS win (new seat)				

== See also ==
- List of constituencies of the Tripura Legislative Assembly
- South Tripura district
