= Matarbari Assembly constituency =

Legislative Assembly constituency in Tripura state, India

Coordinates: 23.51°N 91.50°E

Matarbari
- Constituency No. 32 for the Tripura Legislative Assembly

Constituency details
- Country: India
- Region: Northeast India
- State: Tripura
- District: Gomati
- Lok Sabha constituency: Tripura West
- Established: 1972
- Total electors: 55,023
- Reservation: None

Member of Legislative Assembly
- 13th Tripura Legislative Assembly
- Incumbent Abhishek Debroy
- Party: Bharatiya Janata Party
- Elected year: 2023

Matarbari Legislative Assembly constituency is one of the 60 Legislative Assembly constituencies of Tripura state in India.

It comprises Matarbari tehsil, Maharani tehsil, along with parts of Jamjuri and Garji tehsils in Gomati district.

== Members of the Legislative Assembly ==
Election	Member	Party
1972	Nishi Kanta Sarkar	Indian National Congress
1977	Naresh Chandra Ghosh	Communist Party of India
1983	Maharani Bibhu Kumari Devi	Indian National Congress
1988	Kashiram Reang	Indian National Congress
1993	Madhab Chandra Saha	Communist Party of India
1998	Kashiram Reang	Indian National Congress
2003	Madhab Chandra Saha	Communist Party of India
2008	Madhab Chandra Saha	Communist Party of India
2013	Madhab Chandra Saha	Communist Party of India
2018	Biplab Kumar Ghosh	Bharatiya Janata Party
2023	Abhishek Debroy	Bharatiya Janata Party

== Election results ==
=== 2023 Assembly election ===
2023 Tripura Legislative Assembly election: Matarbari
Party	Candidate	Votes	%	±%
BJP	Abhishek Debroy	25,494	51.06%	▲1.27
INC	Pranajit Roy	16,453	32.95%	▲31.88
TMP	Biralal Noatia	7,101	14.22%	New
NOTA	None of the Above	576	1.15%	▲0.50
Independent	Tarmin Uddin	309	0.62%	New
Margin of victory		9,041	18.11%	▲14.72
Turnout		49,933	90.90%	▼0.85
Registered electors		55,023		▲8.77
BJP hold		Swing	▲1.27	

=== 2018 Assembly election ===
2018 Tripura Legislative Assembly election: Matarbari
Party	Candidate	Votes	%	±%
BJP	Biplab Kumar Ghosh	23,069	49.79%	▲48.71
CPI(M)	Madhab Chandra Saha	21,500	46.40%	▼3.69
INC	Abhijit Sarkar	497	1.07%	▼46.05
AITC	Bishwajit Chakraborty	315	0.68%	New
CPI(ML)L	Gopal Roy	302	0.65%	▼0.28
NOTA	None of the Above	301	0.65%	New
Margin of victory		1,569	3.39%	▲0.43
Turnout		46,336	92.69%	▼4.10
Registered electors		50,586		▲9.32
BJP gain from CPI(M)		Swing	▼0.30	

=== 2013 Assembly election ===
2013 Tripura Legislative Assembly election: Matarbari
Party	Candidate	Votes	%	±%
CPI(M)	Madhab Chandra Saha	22,178	50.09%	▼0.10
INC	Biplab Kumar Ghosh	20,868	47.13%	▲0.87
BJP	Madhusudhan Bhattacharjee	477	1.08%	▼0.55
CPI(ML)L	Gopal Roy	414	0.93%	▼1.00
IPFT	Aghore Debbarma	343	0.77%	New
Margin of victory		1,310	2.96%	▼0.97
Turnout		44,280	95.78%	▲0.41
Registered electors		46,272		
CPI(M) hold		Swing	▼0.10	

=== 2008 Assembly election ===
2008 Tripura Legislative Assembly election: Matarbari
Party	Candidate	Votes	%	±%
CPI(M)	Madhab Chandra Saha	15,601	50.18%	▼2.42
INC	Bibhu Kumari Devi	14,381	46.26%	▲0.90
CPI(ML)L	Gopal Roy	601	1.93%	▼0.10
BJP	Madhusudhan Bhattacharjee	505	1.62%	New
Margin of victory		1,220	3.92%	▼3.32
Turnout		31,088	95.31%	▲9.69
Registered electors		32,626		
CPI(M) hold		Swing	▼2.42	

=== 2003 Assembly election ===
2003 Tripura Legislative Assembly election: Matarbari
Party	Candidate	Votes	%	±%
CPI(M)	Madhab Chandra Saha	14,304	52.61%	▲6.01
INC	Kashiram Reang	12,333	45.36%	▼4.77
CPI(ML)L	Gopal Roy	554	2.04%	New
Margin of victory		1,971	7.25%	▲3.72
Turnout		27,191	85.66%	▲1.84
Registered electors		31,766		▲10.98
CPI(M) gain from INC		Swing		

=== 1998 Assembly election ===
1998 Tripura Legislative Assembly election: Matarbari
Party	Candidate	Votes	%	±%
INC	Kashiram Reang	12,016	50.12%	▲5.88
CPI(M)	Madhab Chandra Saha	11,171	46.60%	▼3.34
BJP	Swapan Ghosh	732	3.05%	▲1.19
Margin of victory		845	3.52%	▼2.17
Turnout		23,973	84.84%	▼1.49
Registered electors		28,622		▲5.36
INC gain from CPI(M)		Swing		

=== 1993 Assembly election ===
1993 Tripura Legislative Assembly election: Matarbari
Party	Candidate	Votes	%	±%
CPI(M)	Madhab Chandra Saha	11,566	49.94%	▲0.33
INC	Kashiram Reang	10,247	44.25%	▼5.41
Independent	Kirpanjoy Debbarma	665	2.87%	New
BJP	Shyamal Dey	432	1.87%	New
Margin of victory		1,319	5.70%	▲5.65
Turnout		23,159	86.34%	▼1.21
Registered electors		27,167		▲22.58
CPI(M) gain from INC		Swing	▲0.29	

=== 1988 Assembly election ===
1988 Tripura Legislative Assembly election: Matarbari
Party	Candidate	Votes	%	±%
INC	Kashiram Reang	9,514	49.65%	▼7.76
CPI(M)	Madhab Chandra Saha	9,506	49.61%	▲8.25
JP	Rabindra Paul	108	0.56%	▼0.40
Margin of victory		8	0.04%	▼16.00
Turnout		19,161	87.29%	▲1.51
Registered electors		22,162		▲17.55
INC hold		Swing		

=== 1983 Assembly election ===
1983 Tripura Legislative Assembly election: Matarbari
Party	Candidate	Votes	%	±%
INC	Maharani Bibhu Kumari Devi	9,195	57.41%	▲38.09
CPI(M)	Madhab Saha	6,625	41.36%	▼9.55
JP	Maran Chandra Das	154	0.96%	▼11.14
Margin of victory		2,570	16.05%	▼15.55
Turnout		16,016	86.26%	▲4.14
Registered electors		18,854		▲21.74
INC gain from CPI(M)		Swing		

=== 1977 Assembly election ===
1977 Tripura Legislative Assembly election: Matarbari
Party	Candidate	Votes	%	±%
CPI(M)	Naresh Chandra Ghosh	6,372	50.91%	▲12.76
INC	Anil Sarkar	2,418	19.32%	▼26.38
TUS	Sachindra Kumar Chowdhury	2,157	17.24%	New
JP	Samar Sarkar	1,515	12.11%	New
Margin of victory		3,954	31.59%	▲24.05
Turnout		12,515	82.20%	▲16.01
Registered electors		15,487		▲19.10
CPI(M) gain from INC		Swing	▲5.21	

=== 1972 Assembly election ===
1972 Tripura Legislative Assembly election: Matarbari
Party	Candidate	Votes	%	±%
INC	Nishi Kanta Sarkar	3,851	45.70%	New
CPI(M)	Naresh Chandra Ghosh	3,215	38.16%	New
Independent	Raj Kumar Kar Gupta	1,360	16.14%	New
Margin of victory		636	7.55%	
Turnout		8,426	67.34%	
Registered electors		13,003		
INC win (new seat)				

== See also ==
- List of constituencies of the Tripura Legislative Assembly
- Gomati district
