= Hrishyamukh Assembly constituency =

Legislative Assembly constituency in Tripura State, India

Coordinates: 23.13°N 91.52°E

Hrishyamukh
- Constituency No. 37 for the Tripura Legislative Assembly

Constituency details
- Country: India
- Region: Northeast India
- State: Tripura
- District: South Tripura
- Lok Sabha constituency: Tripura East
- Established: 1972
- Total electors: 47,006
- Reservation: None

Member of Legislative Assembly
- 13th Tripura Legislative Assembly
- Incumbent Asoke Chandra Mitra
- Party: Communist Party of India (Marxist)
- Elected year: 2023

Hrishyamukh is one of the 60 Legislative Assembly constituencies of Tripura state in India. It is in South Tripura district and a part of Tripura East Lok Sabha constituency.

== Members of the Legislative Assembly ==
Election	Member	Party
1972	Chandra Sekhar Dutta	Indian National Congress
1977	Badal Chowdhury	Communist Party of India
1983	Badal Chowdhury	Communist Party of India
1988	Badal Chowdhury	Communist Party of India
1993	Dilip Chowdhury	Indian National Congress
1998	Badal Chowdhury	Communist Party of India
2003	Badal Chowdhury	Communist Party of India
2008	Badal Chowdhury	Communist Party of India
2013	Badal Chowdhury	Communist Party of India
2018	Badal Chowdhury	Communist Party of India
2023	Asoke Chandra Mitra	Communist Party of India

== Election results ==
=== 2023 Assembly election ===
2023 Tripura Legislative Assembly election: Hrishyamukh
Party	Candidate	Votes	%	±%
CPI(M)	Asoke Chandra Mitra	19,986	46.37%	New
BJP	Dipayan Chowdhury	18,568	43.08%	▲2.83
TMP	Arup Deb	3,856	8.95%	New
NOTA	None of the Above	694	1.61%	▲0.45
Margin of victory		1,418	3.29%	▼12.30
Turnout		43,104	91.75%	▼2.04
Registered electors		47,006		▲8.52
CPI(M) gain from CPI(M)		Swing	▼9.48	

=== 2018 Assembly election ===
2018 Tripura Legislative Assembly election: Hrishyamukh
Party	Candidate	Votes	%	±%
CPI(M)	Badal Chowdhury	22,673	55.84%	▼9.58
BJP	Ashesh Baidya	16,343	40.25%	▲38.58
NOTA	None of the Above	472	1.16%	New
INC	Dilip Kumar Chowdhury (Muhury)	462	1.14%	▼31.77
Independent	Sudarshan Majumder	391	0.96%	New
Margin of victory		6,330	15.59%	▼16.92
Turnout		40,602	93.40%	▼2.40
Registered electors		43,316		▲8.93
CPI(M) hold		Swing	▼9.58	

=== 2013 Assembly election ===
2013 Tripura Legislative Assembly election: Hrishyamukh
Party	Candidate	Votes	%	±%
CPI(M)	Badal Chowdhury	25,009	65.42%	▲5.26
INC	Susankar Bhowmik	12,580	32.91%	▼3.45
BJP	Sudarshan Majumder	639	1.67%	▼0.26
Margin of victory		12,429	32.51%	▲8.70
Turnout		38,228	96.22%	▲0.92
Registered electors		39,764		
CPI(M) hold		Swing		

=== 2008 Assembly election ===
2008 Tripura Legislative Assembly election: Hrishyamukh
Party	Candidate	Votes	%	±%
CPI(M)	Badal Chowdhury	19,610	60.16%	▼6.59
INC	Dilip Chowdhury	11,849	36.35%	▲6.82
BJP	Sudharshan Majumder	630	1.93%	New
AITC	Rajendra Mahajan	505	1.55%	▲0.14
Margin of victory		7,761	23.81%	▼13.41
Turnout		32,594	95.24%	▲7.92
Registered electors		34,231		
CPI(M) hold		Swing	▼6.59	

=== 2003 Assembly election ===
2003 Tripura Legislative Assembly election: Hrishyamukh
Party	Candidate	Votes	%	±%
CPI(M)	Badal Chowdhury	18,052	66.76%	▲0.57
INC	Dilip Chowdhury	7,987	29.54%	▼1.51
AITC	Rajendra Mahajan	380	1.41%	New
Independent	Samar Kumar Das	214	0.79%	New
Independent	Shiba Prasad Chowdhury	160	0.59%	New
Margin of victory		10,065	37.22%	▲2.09
Turnout		27,042	87.37%	▲0.46
Registered electors		30,977		▲11.28
CPI(M) hold		Swing	▲0.57	

=== 1998 Assembly election ===
1998 Tripura Legislative Assembly election: Hrishyamukh
Party	Candidate	Votes	%	±%
CPI(M)	Badal Chowdhury	15,999	66.18%	▲31.08
INC	Dilip Chowdhury	7,506	31.05%	▼33.21
BJP	Jadu Gopal Datta	594	2.46%	New
Margin of victory		8,493	35.13%	▲5.97
Turnout		24,174	87.92%	▲1.78
Registered electors		27,838		▼1.32
CPI(M) gain from INC		Swing		

=== 1993 Assembly election ===
1993 Tripura Legislative Assembly election: Hrishyamukh
Party	Candidate	Votes	%	±%
INC	Dilip Chowdhury	15,420	64.26%	▲19.01
CPI(M)	Badal Chowdhury	8,422	35.10%	▼19.36
Margin of victory		6,998	29.16%	▲19.96
Turnout		23,995	86.16%	▼4.90
Registered electors		28,211		▲20.40
INC gain from CPI(M)		Swing		

=== 1988 Assembly election ===
1988 Tripura Legislative Assembly election: Hrishyamukh
Party	Candidate	Votes	%	±%
CPI(M)	Badal Chowdhury	11,479	54.46%	▲0.59
INC	Debabrata Baidya	9,539	45.26%	▲0.17
Margin of victory		1,940	9.20%	▲0.42
Turnout		21,078	90.83%	▲0.68
Registered electors		23,431		▲22.42
CPI(M) hold		Swing		

=== 1983 Assembly election ===
1983 Tripura Legislative Assembly election: Hrishyamukh
Party	Candidate	Votes	%	±%
CPI(M)	Badal Chowdhury	9,204	53.87%	▼2.14
INC	Amal Mallik	7,703	45.08%	▲6.45
Independent	Niranjan Chakraborty	180	1.05%	New
Margin of victory		1,501	8.78%	▼8.59
Turnout		17,087	90.43%	▲7.64
Registered electors		19,140		▲15.87
CPI(M) hold		Swing		

=== 1977 Assembly election ===
1977 Tripura Legislative Assembly election: Hrishyamukh
Party	Candidate	Votes	%	±%
CPI(M)	Badal Chowdhury	7,552	56.01%	▲26.77
INC	Arun Chandra Bhowmik	5,209	38.63%	▼27.51
TPCC	Shiba Prasad Chowdhury	543	4.03%	New
Independent	Sukhen Chandra Majunder	180	1.33%	New
Margin of victory		2,343	17.38%	▼19.53
Turnout		13,484	83.22%	▲20.15
Registered electors		16,518		▲13.64
CPI(M) gain from INC		Swing	▼10.13	

=== 1972 Assembly election ===
1972 Tripura Legislative Assembly election: Hrishyamukh
Party	Candidate	Votes	%	±%
INC	Chandra Sekhar Dutta	5,911	66.14%	New
CPI(M)	Amalendu Chakraborty	2,613	29.24%	New
Independent	Dwarikanath Bhowmik	413	4.62%	New
Margin of victory		3,298	36.90%	
Turnout		8,937	63.10%	
Registered electors		14,536		
INC win (new seat)				

== See also ==
- List of constituencies of the Tripura Legislative Assembly
- South Tripura district
- Tripura West (Lok Sabha constituency)
