= Biplab Kumar Deb =

10th Chief minister of Indian state of Tripura

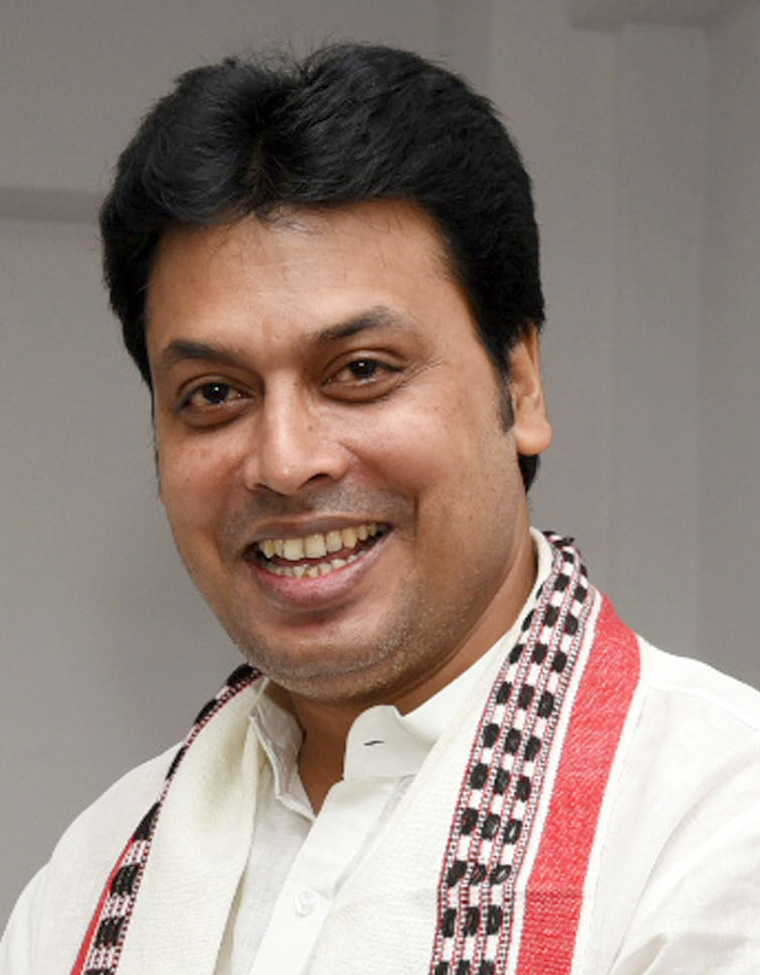

Member of Parliament, Lok Sabha
- Incumbent
- Assumed office 4 June 2024
- Preceded by: Pratima Bhoumik
- Constituency: Tripura West

Member of Parliament, Rajya Sabha
- In office 22 September 2022 – 3 June 2024
- Preceded by: Manik Saha
- Succeeded by: Rajib Bhattacharjee
- Constituency: Tripura

10th Chief Minister of Tripura
- In office 9 March 2018 – 14 May 2022
- Preceded by: Manik Sarkar
- Succeeded by: Manik Saha

Member of the Tripura Legislative Assembly
- In office 3 March 2018 – 22 September 2022
- Preceded by: Gopal Chandra Roy
- Succeeded by: Gopal Chandra Roy
- Constituency: Banamalipur

President of the Bharatiya Janata Party, Tripura Unit
- In office 2016–2018
- Succeeded by: Manik Saha

National General Secretary of Bharatiya Janata Party
- Incumbent
- Assumed office 17 August 2026
- President: Nitin Nabin

Personal details
- Born: 25 November 1971 (age 54) Rajdhar Nagar, Tripura, India
- Party: Bharatiya Janata Party
- Other political affiliations: National Democratic Alliance
- Spouse: Niti Deb (m. 2001; sep. 2025)
- Children: 2 (1 daughter and 1 son)
- Education: Tripura University

Biplab Kumar Deb (born 25 November 1971) is an Indian politician from Bharatiya Janata Party serving as Member of Parliament from Tripura West. He served as the Member of Rajya Sabha from Tripura from 2022 to 2024. He also served as the 10th Chief Minister of Tripura from 2018 to 2022. He was the first Chief Minister of Tripura from the Bharatiya Janata Party. He was the member of the Tripura Legislative Assembly from Banamalipur constituency from 2018 to 2022. He was also the president of the Bharatiya Janata Party's Tripura unit from 2016 to 2018.

== Personal life ==
Biplab Deb was born on 25 November 1971 in Rajdhar Nagar village, Udaipur, Gomati district, Tripura to Hirudhan Deb and Mina Rani Deb. His parents had migrated to India as refugees from Chandpur District, East Pakistan during Bangladesh Liberation War in 1971 before his birth. His father is a citizen of India since 27 June 1967. He spent his childhood and schooling days in Tripura, completing his graduation from Tripura University before shifting to New Delhi. He later returned to Tripura after spending 15 years in New Delhi and other parts of northern India.

He married Niti Deb, an officer in the State Bank of India, on 17 November 2001. They have a son and a daughter. In January 2025, Biplab Kumar Deb and his wife Neeti Deb announced their divorce. As of January 2025, the couple had separated, awaiting divorce.

== Political career ==
Deb was elected the President of Tripura state unit of BJP in January 2016, succeeding Sudhindra Dasgupta, a veteran who was party president for five years. He started his political career by campaigning for the 2018 state election. He began his campaign from the Tripura Tribal Areas Autonomous District Council which was believed to be the base of the then governing CPI(M).

=== Chief Minister ===
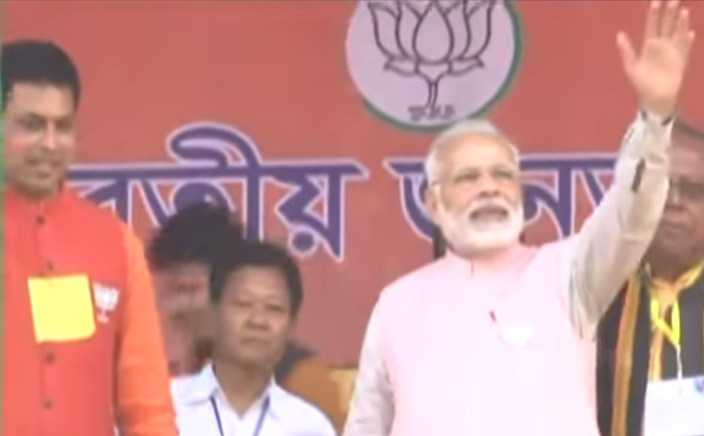
Biplab Kumar Deb with Narendra Modi at a political rally

Deb contested the election from Banamalipur Constituency in Agartala, which was held by Indian National Congress MLA Gopal Chandra Roy, and won by a margin of 9,549 votes. Deb led the Tripura's Election campaign and defeated Left Front after 25 years by winning 44 seats with his ally Indigenous Peoples Front of Tripura out of possible 60 seats in Tripura.

Deb campaigned on the subject of youth employment opportunities, which he promised to improve if elected Chief Minister of Tripura. He also promised the employees of Tripura that he would implement the 7th Pay Commission once he got elected. Deb brought in key BJP ministers from across India to campaign for the party in Tripura.

He took the oath of office as the 10th Chief Minister of Tripura on 9 March 2018. During his tenure as the Chief Minister of Tripura, several government programs & schemes were implemented for the development of Tripura.

==== Economic development of Tripura ====
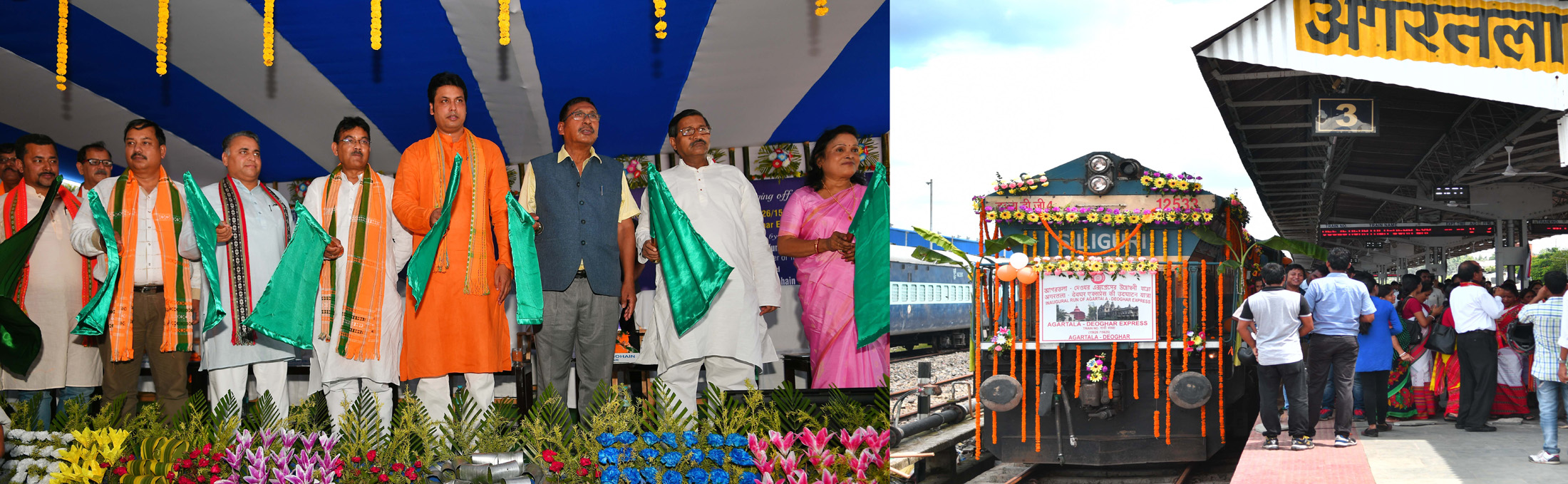
The Minister of State for Railways, Rajen Gohain along with the Chief Minister of Tripura, Biplab Kumar Deb and other dignitaries flagging off the Agartala-Deoghar Express Weekly train, at Agartala Railway Station, in Agartala on 6 July 2018.

In June 2018, the State Government of Tripura under Deb presented its first state budget, which was a 'deficit free budget'. In January 2019, the 15th Finance Commission, headed by N K Singh, held detailed discussions with the State Government of Tripura headed by Deb. The Commission acknowledged the effective measures taken by the government during its first 10 months in office & fully shared the vision to make Tripura a model state.

Measures for farmers' welfare in Tripura

In June 2018, Deb announced renaming the Tripura State 'Agriculture Ministry' to 'Agriculture and Farmers' Welfare Ministry'. In December 2018, for the first time in the history of the state, the Food Corporation of India started procuring paddy directly from farmers in Tripura at Minimum Support Price (MSP).

He resigned from the post on 14 May 2022.

=== Member of Parliament ===
Deb was elected as a Member of the Rajya Sabha (Upper House of the Indian Parliament) in 2022. In December 2022, Deb moved a private member resolution for setting up of the Agarwood Board of India for development of agarwood sector in the country, which received support cutting across party lines in the Rajya Sabha. In October 2023, Deb was nominated by the Vice-President of India, Jagdeep Dhankhar to participate in the 'Parliamentary Forum on LIFE (Lifestyle for Environment)' at the 9th G-20 Parliamentary Speakers’ Summit (P-20) organised in New Delhi during the tenure of India's G20 Presidency.

== Controversies ==
He also made controversial remarks on the Civil Service Examination, stating that only civil engineers should sit for civil service exams.

In November 2019, Deb claimed, "The Mughals intended to bomb the culture of Tripura".

He also stated that international beauty pageants were a farce, and claimed that the decision to award Miss World and Miss Universe titles to Indian women for five years in a row was market-driven rather than based on the beauty of the participants while questioning the rationale behind awarding Diana Hayden the Miss World pageant.

On 17 April 2018, he stated, "Episodes of the Mahabharat war were narrated to Dhritarashtra by Sanjay. This means technology was there, Internet was there, satellite was there," claiming that the existence of modern satellite technology and the worldwide web in about 7,000BC was the only reasonable explanation for the accounts of battles retold in the Mahabharata.

In 2020, he claimed that Punjabis and Jats are physically strong but less intelligent than Bengalis.

== See also ==
- 2018 Tripura Legislative Assembly election
- Biplab Kumar Deb ministry

Political offices
Preceded by Manik Sarkar	Chief Minister of Tripura; 9 March 2018 - 14 May 2022	Succeeded by Manik Saha
