= Matilal Sarkar =

Indian politician

Matilal Sarkar (born 15 August 1941) is an Indian politician from the Communist Party of India (Marxist). He was Member of the Parliament of India, representing Tripura in the Rajya Sabha. His Rajya Sabha tenure ended on 2 April 2010.

== Rajya Sabha election history ==
Position	Party	Constituency	From	To	Tenure
Member of Parliament, Rajya Sabha	CPI(M)	Tripura	22 May 2002	2 April 2004	7 years, 315 days
Member of Parliament, Rajya Sabha	CPI(M)	Tripura	3 April 2004	2 April 2010	7 years, 315 days
