= Manik Saha =

Chief Minister of Tripura (born 1953)

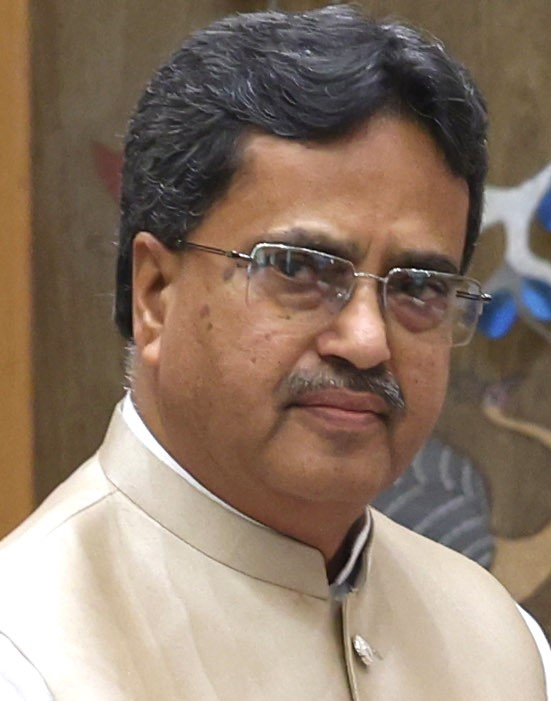
- Saha in 2025

11th Chief Minister of Tripura
- Incumbent
- Assumed office 15 May 2022
- Governor: Indrasena Reddy; Satyadev Narayan Arya
- Deputy: Jishnu Dev Varma (until 2 March 2023)
- Cabinet: First (2022–2023); Second (2023–)
- Ministry & Departments: Home; Health and Family Welfare; PWD
- Preceded by: Biplab Kumar Deb

Member of Tripura Legislative Assembly
- Incumbent
- Assumed office 26 June 2022
- Preceded by: Ashish Kumar Saha
- Constituency: Town Bordowali

Member of Parliament, Rajya Sabha
- In office 3 April 2022 – 4 July 2022
- Preceded by: Jharna Das
- Succeeded by: Biplab Kumar Deb
- Constituency: Tripura

President of Bharatiya Janata Party, Tripura
- In office 2020–2022

Personal details
- Born: 8 January 1953 (age 73) Agartala, Tripura, India
- Party: Bharatiya Janata Party (2016–present); Indian National Congress (till 2016)
- Spouse: Swapna Saha
- Children: 2
- Education: King George's Medical University (M.D.S.); Patna Dental College (B.D.S.)

Manik Saha (born 8 January 1953) is an Indian politician serving as the Chief Minister of Tripura and leader of the house in the Tripura Legislative Assembly. He has represented the Town Bordowali Assembly constituency in the Tripura Legislative Assembly since 26 June 2022. He was also a member of the Rajya Sabha from Tripura in 2022 until he became Chief Minister, and the President of Bharatiya Janata Party, Tripura from 2020 to 2022. He has been a member of the Bharatiya Janata Party since 2016 and was a member of the Indian National Congress before 2016.

== Political career ==
Saha was a member of the Indian National Congress before joining the Bharatiya Janata Party in 2016. He became the President of the Bharatiya Janata Party, Tripura unit in 2020 till 2022. In June 2022, Saha was elected as an MLA. He is strongly critical of communism in Tripura. He declared himself an anti-communist and a committed capitalist.

=== Chief Minister of Tripura ===
On 14 May 2022, just a year before assembly polls in the state, Biplab Kumar Deb resigned from his post. After a hurriedly called legislature party meeting, BJP announced Saha's name as his successor and said he would extend cooperation to the new chief minister. Saha took oath as the 11th Chief Minister of Tripura on 15 May 2022.

== Personal life ==
Saha was born to Makhan Lal Saha and Priya Bala Saha on 8 January 1953. He received his B.D.S. and M.D.S. in "Oral and Maxillofacial Surgery" degrees from Patna Dental College and King George's Medical University. Saha is married to Swapna Saha, with whom he has two daughters. He is also the president of the Tripura Cricket Association. Before he joined mainstream politics, Saha used to teach in Tripura Medical College located at Hapania.
