= Badal Choudhury =

Indian politician

Badal Choudhury বাদল চৌধুরী

Minister for Health & Family Welfare and Revenue and Public Works, Tripura
- In office March 2013 – 9 March 2018
- Chief Minister: Manik Sarkar

Member of Legislative Assembly, Tripura
- In office 1998–2023
- Preceded by: Dilip Chowdhury
- Succeeded by: Asoke Chandra Mitra
- Constituency: Hrishyamukh

Member of the Indian Parliament for Tripura West
- In office 1996–1998
- Preceded by: Santosh Mohan Dev
- Succeeded by: Samar Chowdhury
- Constituency: Tripura West

Member of Legislative Assembly (India), Tripura
- In office 1977–1993
- Preceded by: Chandra Sekhar Dutta
- Succeeded by: Dilip Chowdhury
- Constituency: Hrishyamukh

Personal details
- Born: 1 November 1951 (age 74) Belonia
- Party: CPI(M)
- Spouse: Smt. Namita Gope (Choudhury)

Badal Choudhury is an Indian politician and member of the Communist Party of India (Marxist). Chowdhury is a member of the Tripura Legislative Assembly from the Hrishyamukh constituency in South Tripura district. He was minister of Health & Family Welfare and Revenue and Public Works (in Manik Sarkar Government) from 2013 to 2018.

== Political career ==
Badal Choudhury was very active in student movements in his student days. In 1968, at the age of 17, he became a member of the Communist Party of India (Marxist). From 1972 to 1981, he was the Secretary of the CPI (M) Belonia Divisional Committee. In 1974, he was promoted to State Committee Member of CPI (M). In 1977, Choudhury was elected for the first time as a Member of Legislative Assembly, Tripura, where he would serve until 1993. In 2008, Choudhury became a Central Committee member of the Communist Party of India (Marxist).
