= Manindra Reang =

Indian politician

Minister for Tribal Welfare (TRP & PTG), Home (Jail) and GA (Printing and Stationery)
- In office 2003–2018

Member of the Tripura Legislative Assembly
- In office 2003–2018
- Constituency: Santirbazar

Personal details
- Born: 15 August 1948 (age 78) Tripura, British India
- Party: The Indigenous Progressive Regional Alliance
- Spouse: Parbati Reang
- Parents: Bedanta Reang (Father); Nokkaforti Reang (Mother)
- Religion: Hindu

Manindra Reang is a Tipra-Indian politician from Tripura. He was elected as a Member of the Tripura Legislative Assembly representing Santirbazar from 2003 to 2018.

He served as Minister for Tribal Welfare (TRP & PTG), Home (Jail) and GA (Printing and Stationery) of Tripura from 2003 to 2018.

After his defeat in the 2018 Tripura Legislative Assembly election Manindra Reang joined the Janata Dal (United) in 2019.

In 2022, Manindra Reang joined the Tipra Motha Party.
