= List of leaders of the opposition in the Tripura Legislative Assembly =

Chairperson of the principal opposition party in TR Assembly

Leader of the Opposition in Tripura Legislative Assembly
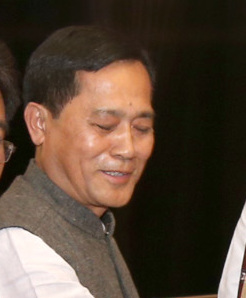
- Incumbent; Jitendra Chaudhury since 20 March 2024
- Style: The Honourable
- Nominator: Members of Official Opposition of the Tripura Legislative Assembly
- Appointer: Speaker of Tripura assembly
- Term length: 5 years No renewable limit
- Inaugural holder: Aghore Deb Barma
- Formation: 1 July 1963; 63 years, 68 days ago

The leader of the opposition in the Tripura Legislative Assembly is an elected Member of the Legislative Assembly who leads the official opposition in the Tripura Legislative Assembly in India. Official Opposition is a term used in the Tripura Legislative Assembly to designate the political party which has secured the second largest number of seats in the Tripura assembly. In order to get formal recognition, the party must have at least 10% of the total membership of the Legislative Assembly. Since 1963, the Tripura Legislative Assembly has had 12 leaders of the opposition.

== Role ==
The Opposition's main role is to question the government of the day and hold them accountable to the public. The Opposition is equally responsible for upholding the best interests of the people of the country. They have to ensure that the Government does not take any steps, which might have negative effects on the people of the state. There are actions of the ruling party which may be beneficial to the masses and opposition is expected to support such steps.

== List of leaders of the opposition ==
No.	Portrait	Name	Constituency	Term of office			Assembly (Election)	Appointed by	Political party
No.	Portrait	Name	Constituency	Assumed office	Left office	Time in office	Assembly (Election)	Appointed by	Political party
1		Aghore Debbarma		1 July 1963	December 1963	158 days	1st	Upendra Kumar Roy	Communist Party of India
2		Nripendra Chakraborty		1964	1967	More than 3 years	1st	Upendra Kumar Roy	Communist Party of India (Marxist)
3		Bidya Debbarma	Kalyanpur	1967	1971	More than 4 years	2nd (1967 election)	Manindra Lal Bhowmik	Communist Party of India (Marxist)
–		Vacant (President's rule)	N/A	1 November 1971	20 March 1972	140 days	–	–	N/A
(2)		Nripendra Chakraborty	Asharambari	29 March 1972	31 March 1977	5 years, 2 days	3rd (1972 election)	Manindra Lal Bhowmik	Communist Party of India (Marxist)
4		Munsur Ali (Tripura politician)	Boxanagar	April 1977	4 November 1977	217 days	3rd (1972 election)	Manindra Lal Bhowmik	Indian National Congress
–		Vacant (President's rule)	N/A	5 November 1977	5 January 1978	61 days	–	–	N/A
5		Drao Kumar Reang	Santirbazar	24 January 1978	6 January 1983	4 years, 347 days	4th (1977 election)	Sudhanwa Debbarma	Tripura Upajati Juba Samiti
6		Ashok Kumar Bhattacharya	Town Bordowali	9 February 1983	31 August 1986	3 years, 203 days	5th (1983 election)	Amarendra Sharma	Indian National Congress
7		Sudhir Ranjan Majumdar	Khayerpur	1 September 1986	4 February 1988	1 year, 156 days	5th (1983 election)	Amarendra Sharma	Indian National Congress
(2)		Nripendra Chakraborty	Pramodenagar	7 February 1988	18 February 1992	4 years, 11 days	6th (1988 election)	Jyotirmoy Nath	Communist Party of India (Marxist)
8		Dasarath Deb	Ramchandraghat	19 February 1992	28 February 1993	1 year, 9 days	6th (1988 election)	Jyotirmoy Nath	Communist Party of India (Marxist)
–		Vacant (President's rule)	N/A	11 March 1993	10 April 1993	30 days	–	–	N/A
9		Samir Ranjan Barman	Bishalgarh	8 March 1994	10 March 1998	4 years, 2 days	7th (1993 election)	Bimal Sinha	Indian National Congress
9		Samir Ranjan Barman	Bishalgarh	29 July 1998	6 February 2000	1 year, 192 days	8th (1998 election)	Jitendra Sarkar	Indian National Congress
10		Jawahar Saha	Birganj	7 February 2000	28 February 2003	3 years, 21 days	8th (1998 election)	Jitendra Sarkar	Indian National Congress
11		Ratan Lal Nath	Mohanpur	21 March 2003	3 March 2008	4 years, 348 days	9th (2003 election)	Ramendra Chandra Debnath	Indian National Congress
11		Ratan Lal Nath	Mohanpur	17 March 2008	28 February 2013	4 years, 348 days	10th (2008 election)	Ramendra Chandra Debnath	Indian National Congress
11		Ratan Lal Nath	Mohanpur	26 April 2013	8 March 2018	4 years, 316 days	11th (2013 election)	Ramendra Chandra Debnath	Indian National Congress
12		Manik Sarkar	Dhanpur	11 March 2018	13 March 2023	5 years, 2 days	12th (2018 election)	Rebati Mohan Das	Communist Party of India (Marxist)
13		Animesh Debbarma	Asharambari	24 March 2023	6 March 2024	348 days	13th (2023 election)	Biswa Bandhu Sen	Tipra Motha Party
14		Jitendra Chaudhury	Sabroom	6 March 2024	Incumbent	2 years, 185 days	13th (2023 election)	Biswa Bandhu Sen	Communist Party of India (Marxist)

== Statistics ==
#	Leader of Opposition	Party	Term of office	
#	Leader of Opposition	Party	Longest term	Total duration
1	Ratan Lal Nath	INC	4 years, 348 days	14 years, 282 days
2	Nripendra Chakraborty	CPI(M)	5 years, 2 days	12 years, 13 days
3	Samir Ranjan Barman	INC	4 years, 2 days	5 years, 194 days
4	Manik Sarkar	CPI(M)	5 years, 12 days	5 years, 12 days
5	Drao Kumar Reang	TUS	4 years, 347 days	4 years, 347 days
6	Bidya Debbarma	CPI(M)	4 years, 0 days	4 years, 0 days
7	Ashok Kumar Bhattacharyya	INC	3 years, 203 days	3 years, 203 days
8	Jawahar Saha	INC	3 years, 21 days	3 years, 21 days
9	Jitendra Chaudhury*	CPI(M)*	2 years, 185 days*	2 years, 185 days*
10	Sudhir Ranjan Majumdar	INC	1 year, 156 days	1 year, 156 days
11	Dasarath Deb	CPI(M)	1 year, 9 days	1 year, 9 days
12	Animesh Debbarma	TMP	348 days	348 days
13	Munsur Ali	INC	217 days	217 days
14	Aghore Debbarma	CPI	158 days	158 days
