= First Saha ministry =

Cabinet ministry of Tripura, India (2022–2023)

- Ministry of Tripura

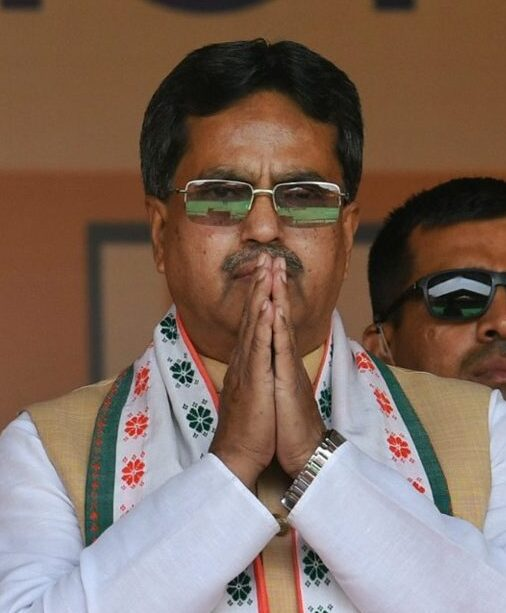
- Date formed: 14 May 2022
- Date dissolved: 8 March 2023

People and organisations
- Head of state: Governor; Satyadev Narayan Arya
- Head of government: Manik Saha
- Member parties: Bhartiya Janata Party
- Status in legislature: Majority
- Opposition party: CPI(M)
- Opposition leader: Manik Sarkar

History
- Election: 2018
- Legislature term: 5 years
- Predecessor: Deb
- Successor: Saha II

First Manik Saha ministry is the cabinet ministry of Tripura led by the Chief Minister Manik Saha.

On 14 May 2022, just a year before assembly polls in the state, Biplab Kumar Deb resigned from his post. After a hurriedly called BJP legislature party meeting, Deb announced Saha's name as his successor and said he would extend cooperation to the new Chief Minister.

This is a list of ministers from Manik Saha cabinets.

== Council of Ministers ==
- As in May 2022

Portfolio	Minister	Took office	Left office	Party	Ref
Chief Minister; Home; Health and Family Welfare; Public Works Department; Industries and Commerce; General Administration; Election; Other departments not allocated to any Minister	Manik Saha	14 May 2022	Incumbent	BJP	
Deputy Chief Minister; Finance; Power; Rural Development; Planning and Coordination; Science; Technology; Environment	Jishnu Dev Varma	18 May 2022	Incumbent	BJP	
Revenue; Forest	N. C. Debbarma	18 May 2022	1 January 2023	IPFT	
Law; Education and Parliamentary Affairs	Ratan Lal Nath	18 May 2022	Incumbent	BJP	
Transport; Agriculture and Farmers’ Welfare; Tourism	Pranjit Singha Roy	18 May 2022	Incumbent	BJP	
Food and Civil Supplies; Urban Development	Manoj Kanti Deb	18 May 2022	Incumbent	BJP	
Industries and Commerce; Social Welfare and Social Education	Santana Chakma	18 May 2022	Incumbent	BJP	
SC Welfare; Animal Resource and Labour	Bhagaban Das	18 May 2022	Incumbent	BJP	
Information and Cultural Affairs; Youth Affairs and Sports; and Drinking Water and Sanitation	Sushanta Chowdhury	18 May 2022	Incumbent	BJP	
Tribal Welfare and Handloom; Handicrafts and Sericulture	Ram Pada Jamatia	18 May 2022	Incumbent	BJP	
Fisheries and Co-operation	Prem Kumar Reang	18 May 2022	Incumbent	IPFT	
Jail; Fire and Emergency Services; Welfare of Minorities and Other Backward Classes	Ram Prasad Paul	18 May 2022	Incumbent	BJP	

== See also ==
- Government of Tripura
- Tripura Legislative Assembly
