= Pramodenagar Assembly constituency =

Constituency of the Tripura legislative assembly in India

Pramodenagar
- Former constituency for the Tripura Legislative Assembly

Constituency details
- Country: India
- Region: Northeast India
- State: Tripura
- Established: 1972
- Abolished: 2008
- Total electors: 29,781

Pramodenagar Assembly constituency was an assembly constituency in the Indian state of Tripura.

== Members of the Legislative Assembly ==
Election	Member	Party
1972	Manindra Debbarma	Communist Party of India
1977	Nirpen Chakraborty	Communist Party of India
1983	Nirpen Chakraborty	Communist Party of India
1988	Nirpen Chakraborty	Communist Party of India
1993	Aghore Debbarma	Communist Party of India
1998	Aghore Debbarma	Communist Party of India
2003	Animesh Debbarma	Indigenous Nationalist Party of Twipra
2008	Aghore Debbarma	Communist Party of India

== Election results ==
=== Assembly Election 2008 ===
2008 Tripura Legislative Assembly election : Pramodenagar
Party	Candidate	Votes	%	±%
CPI(M)	Aghore Debbarma	14,972	54.00%	▲7.25
Independent	Animesh Debbarma	10,153	36.62%	New
INPT	Bidyut Debbarma	1,028	3.71%	▼44.81
Independent	Ganesh Kalai	684	2.47%	New
Independent	Biswajit Debbarma	316	1.14%	New
Independent	Jyotish Debbarma	293	1.06%	New
AMB	Shila Debbarma(Bhowmik)	280	1.01%	New
Margin of victory		4,819	17.38%	▲15.61
Turnout		27,726	93.23%	▲20.02
Registered electors		29,781		▼0.43
CPI(M) gain from INPT		Swing	▲5.48	

=== Assembly Election 2003 ===
2003 Tripura Legislative Assembly election : Pramodenagar
Party	Candidate	Votes	%	±%
INPT	Animesh Debbarma	10,607	48.52%	New
CPI(M)	Aghore Debbarma	10,220	46.75%	▼8.50
BJP	Managal Urang	794	3.63%	▼5.86
Independent	Mantu Debbarma	239	1.09%	New
Margin of victory		387	1.77%	▼20.53
Turnout		21,860	73.08%	▼3.69
Registered electors		29,911		▲4.45
INPT gain from CPI(M)		Swing	▼6.73	

=== Assembly Election 1998 ===
1998 Tripura Legislative Assembly election : Pramodenagar
Party	Candidate	Votes	%	±%
CPI(M)	Aghore Debbarma	12,148	55.25%	▼10.50
INC	Bahuroy (Bahu Chandra) Debbarma	7,246	32.96%	▼0.19
BJP	Rabindra Debbarma	2,087	9.49%	New
AMB	Rabini Debnath (Debbarma)	505	2.30%	New
Margin of victory		4,902	22.30%	▼10.31
Turnout		21,986	78.24%	▼4.78
Registered electors		28,638		
CPI(M) hold		Swing	▼10.50	

=== Assembly Election 1993 ===
1993 Tripura Legislative Assembly election : Pramodenagar
Party	Candidate	Votes	%	±%
CPI(M)	Aghore Debbarma	15,013	65.75%	▲3.93
INC	Biswajit Deb Rankhal	7,569	33.15%	▼1.59
Independent	Dalendra Debbarma	146	0.64%	New
Margin of victory		7,444	32.60%	▲5.52
Turnout		22,832	82.77%	▼7.55
Registered electors		27,996		
CPI(M) hold		Swing		

=== Assembly Election 1988 ===
1988 Tripura Legislative Assembly election : Pramodenagar
Party	Candidate	Votes	%	±%
CPI(M)	Nirpen Chakraborty	12,828	61.83%	▲0.96
INC	Pradip Kumar Roy	7,209	34.75%	▲25.66
Independent	Siromani Roy	711	3.43%	New
Margin of victory		5,619	27.08%	▼4.53
Turnout		20,748	89.90%	▲2.76
Registered electors		23,284		▲12.84
CPI(M) hold		Swing		

=== Assembly Election 1983 ===
1983 Tripura Legislative Assembly election : Pramodenagar
Party	Candidate	Votes	%	±%
CPI(M)	Nirpen Chakraborty	10,845	60.87%	▲3.34
Independent	Siromani Roy	5,212	29.25%	New
INC	Lalit Mohan Goswami	1,618	9.08%	▼7.71
BJP	Manju Dasgupta	143	0.80%	New
Margin of victory		5,633	31.61%	▼9.12
Turnout		17,818	87.60%	▲5.43
Registered electors		20,634		▲9.32
CPI(M) hold		Swing	▲3.34	

=== Assembly Election 1977 ===
1977 Tripura Legislative Assembly election : Pramodenagar
Party	Candidate	Votes	%	±%
CPI(M)	Nirpen Chakraborty	8,786	57.53%	▼3.72
INC	Upendra Chandra Debnath	2,565	16.79%	▼21.96
TPCC	Dakhai Tanti	1,468	9.61%	New
JP	Maran Chandra Dey	1,280	8.38%	New
Proutist Bloc, India	Siromani Roy	1,061	6.95%	New
Independent	Upananda Nath	113	0.74%	New
Margin of victory		6,221	40.73%	▲18.24
Turnout		15,273	82.30%	▲3.76
Registered electors		18,874		▲19.90
CPI(M) hold		Swing	▼3.72	

=== Assembly Election 1972 ===
1972 Tripura Legislative Assembly election : Pramodenagar
Party	Candidate	Votes	%	±%
CPI(M)	Manindra Debbarma	7,439	61.25%	New
INC	Nanda Kumar Debbarma	4,707	38.75%	New
Margin of victory		2,732	22.49%	
Turnout		12,146	79.25%	
Registered electors		15,742		
CPI(M) win (new seat)				
