= Biplab Kumar Deb ministry =

- Ministry of Tripura
- Date formed: 9 March 2018
- Date dissolved: 14 May 2022

People and organisations
- Head of state: Satyadev Narayan Arya (Governor)
- Head of government: Biplab Kumar Deb (Chief Minister)
- No. of ministers: 11
- Ministers removed: 1
- Member parties: BJP; IPFT
- Status in legislature: Majority
- Opposition party: CPI(M)
- Opposition leader: Manik Sarkar

History
- Election: 2018
- Legislature term: 5 years
- Predecessor: Sarkar IV
- Successor: Saha I

This was a list of ministers from Biplab Kumar Deb cabinet starting from 11 March 2018 to 14 May 2022. Biplab Kumar Deb is the leader of BJP who was sworn in the Chief Ministers of Tripura on 11 March 2018. It's ended on 14 May 2022 with the abolishment of his CM post.

The ministry has 8 ministers including the Chief Minister. The following is the list of ministers of his ministry.

In the current government, 9 incumbents including the Chief Minister belongs to the BJP while 2 incumbents belongs to the IPFT.

== Council of Ministers ==
- As in May 2022

Portfolio	Minister	Took office	Left office	Party	Ref
Chief Minister: Home (Excluding Jail, Fire & Emergency Services); General Administration; Health & Family Welfare; PWD (Excluding DWS); Industries & Commerce (Including IT); Election; Other departments not allocated to any Minister	Biplab Kumar Deb	2018	14 May 2022	BJP	
Deputy Chief Minister: Finance; Power; Planning and Coordination (Including Statistics); Rural Development (Including Panchayats); TREDA; Science, Technology and Environment	Jishnu Dev Varma		Incumbent	BJP	
Senior Cabinet Minister: Land; Revenue (Including Relief & Disaster Management) and; Forests	Narendra Chandra Debbarma		Incumbent	IPFT	
Education (School & Higher); Law; Parliamentary Affairs	Ratan Lal Nath		Incumbent	BJP	
Agriculture and Farmers Welfare; Transport; Tourism	Pranjit Singha Roy		Incumbent	BJP	
Tribal Welfare; Industries & Commerce (Handloom Handicrafts & Sericulture); Fisheries	Mevar Kumar Jamatia		Incumbent	IPFT	
Food, Civil Supplies & Consumer Affairs; Industries & Commerce (Excluding Handloom, Handicrafts, Sericulture and IT)	Manoj Kanti Deb		Incumbent	BJP	
Social Welfare & Social Education; Urban Development (UDD)	Santana Chakma		Incumbent	BJP	
Home (Jail, Fire & Emergency Services); OBC Welfare; Minorities Welfare; Co-operation	Ram Prasad Paul		Incumbent	BJP	
SC Welfare; Labour; Animal Resource Development	Bhagaban Das		Incumbent	BJP	
PWD (DWS); Youth Affairs & Sports; Information & Cultural Affairs	Sushanta Chowdhury		Incumbent	BJP	

=== Former Ministers ===
Portfolio	Minister	Took office	Left office	Party	Ref
Health & Family Welfare; PWD (Including DWS); Industries & Commerce (Including IT); Science, Technology & Environment	Sudip Roy Barman	March 2018	1 July 2019	BJP	

== See also ==
- Government of Tripura
- Tripura Legislative Assembly
