= Secular Democratic Front =

Political coalition in India

- SDF; Secular Democratic Front
- Abbreviation: SDF
- Leader: Jitendra Chaudhury (Leader of Opposition)
- Founders: Manik Sarkar; Sudip Roy Barman
- Founded: 2023; 3 years ago
- Political position: Left-wing
- National affiliation: Indian National Developmental Inclusive Alliance
- Colours: Red
- Lok Sabha: 0 / 2
- Rajya Sabha: 0 / 1
- Tripura Legislative Assembly: 13 / 60
- Tripura Tribal Areas Autonomous District Council: 0 / 30
- Gram Panchayats: 301 / 6,370
- Panchayat Samitis: 14 / 423
- Zilla Parishads: 3 / 116
- Municipalities: 3 / 222
- Politics of India; Political parties; Elections; A: The Front is described as a broad left-wing alliance, with centre-left and far-left factions.

The Secular Democratic Front (SDF) is an opposition front in the Indian state of Tripura consisting of the Left Front and the Indian National Congress which formed before the 2023 Tripura Legislative Assembly election in opposition to the incumbent Bharatiya Janata Party government. The main parties in this coalition are the Communist Party of India (Marxist) and the Indian National Congress, alongside other minor parties. SDF is currently the official opposition in Tripura Legislative Assembly.

== Members ==
No.	Party	Flag	Symbol	Leader
1.	Communist Party of India (Marxist)			Jitendra Chaudhury
2.	Indian National Congress			Ashish Kumar Saha
3.	All India Forward Bloc			Paresh Chandra Sarkar
4.	Revolutionary Socialist Party			Dipak Deb
5.	Communist Party of India			Yudhisthir Das
6.	Independent			Purushuttam Roy Barman

== Electoral history ==
=== Results of Legislative Assembly elections in Tripura ===
Election Year	Overall Votes	% of overall votes	Total seats	Seats won/ Seats contested	+/- in seats	+/- in vote share
2023	911,232	36.01	60	14 / 60	▼2	▼10.13 pp

=== Results of Indian general elections in Tripura ===
Election Year	Overall Votes	% of overall votes	Total seats	Seats won/ Seats contested	+/- in seats	+/- in vote share
2024	5,60,391	23.91	2	0	Steady	▼18.76

== See also ==
- Asom Sonmilito Morcha
