= Dharmanagar Assembly constituency =

Legislative Assembly constituency in Tripura State, India

Coordinates: 24.39°N 92.16°E

Dharmanagar
- Constituency No. 56 for the Tripura Legislative Assembly

Constituency details
- Country: India
- Region: Northeast India
- State: Tripura
- District: North Tripura
- Lok Sabha constituency: Tripura East
- Established: 1972
- Total electors: 44,745
- Reservation: None

Member of Legislative Assembly
- 13th Tripura Legislative Assembly
- Incumbent Jahar Chakraborti
- Party: BJP
- Elected year: 2026

Dharmanagar Assembly constituency is one of the 60 Legislative Assembly constituencies of Tripura state in India. The first elections held for this constituency were in 1972. It comprises the Ragna, Baruakandi and Dharmanagar sub-divisions of North Tripura district.

== Members of the Legislative Assembly ==
Election	Member	Party
1972	Amarendra Sarma	Independent politician
1977	Amarendra Sarma	Communist Party of India (Marxist)
1983	Amarendra Sarma	Communist Party of India (Marxist)
1988	Kalidas Dutta	Indian National Congress
1993	Amitabha Datta	Communist Party of India (Marxist)
1998	Amitabha Datta	Communist Party of India (Marxist)
2003	Amitabha Datta	Communist Party of India (Marxist)
2008	Biswa Bandhu Sen	Indian National Congress
2013	Biswa Bandhu Sen	Indian National Congress
2018	Biswa Bandhu Sen	Bharatiya Janata Party
2023	Biswa Bandhu Sen	Bharatiya Janata Party
2026^	Jahar Chakraborti	Bharatiya Janata Party

- ^ denotes by-election

== Election results ==
=== 2026 by-election ===
Tripura Legislative Assembly by-election, 2026: Dharmanagar
Party	Candidate	Votes	%	±%
BJP	Jahar Chakraborti	24,291	65.13%	▲15.78
CPI(M)	Amitabha Datta	6,001	16.09%	New entry
INC	Chayan Bhattacharjee	5,936	15.92%	▼30.53
NOTA	None of the Above	444	1.19%	▲0.2
AMB	Bibhas Ranjan Das	274	0.73%	New
SUCI(C)	Sanjoy Chaudhury	224	0.61%	New
Independent	Brajalal Chatterjee	126	0.34%	New
Margin of victory		18,290	49.04%	▲46.14
Turnout		37,298		
Registered electors				
BJP hold		Swing	▲15.78	

=== 2023 ===
2023 Tripura Legislative Assembly election: Dharmanagar
Party	Candidate	Votes	%	±%
BJP	Biswa Bandhu Sen	18,684	49.35%	▼7.86
INC	Chayan Bhattacharya	17,586	46.45%	▲44.73
Independent	Saurabh Goswami	658	1.74%	New
NOTA	None of the Above	444	1.17%	▲0.49
Independent	Bibash Ranjan Das	203	0.54%	New
Margin of victory		1,098	2.9%	▼16.62
Turnout		37,861	84.62%	▼5.15
Registered electors		44,745		▲7.59
BJP hold		Swing	▼7.86	

=== 2018 ===
2018 Tripura Legislative Assembly election: Dharmanagar
Party	Candidate	Votes	%	±%
BJP	Biswa Bandhu Sen	21,357	57.21%	▲55.25
CPI(M)	Abhijit De	14,070	37.69%	▼8.08
INC	Kebal Kanti Nandi	642	1.72%	▼49.27
NOTA	None of the Above	254	0.68%	New
Margin of victory		7,287	19.52%	▲14.29
Turnout		37,333	89.77%	▼1.59
Registered electors		41,588		▲7.69
BJP gain from INC		Swing	▲6.22	

=== 2013 ===
2013 Tripura Legislative Assembly election: Dharmanagar
Party	Candidate	Votes	%	±%
INC	Biswa Bandhu Sen	17,991	50.99%	▼0.66
CPI(M)	Amitabha Datta	16,147	45.77%	▲1.91
BJP	Jahar Chakrabarti	692	1.96%	▼0.64
Independent	Pratyush Nag	183	0.52%	New
Margin of victory		1,844	5.23%	▼2.56
Turnout		35,281	91.36%	▲1.43
Registered electors		38,617		▲12.2
INC hold		Swing	▼0.66	

=== 2008 ===
2008 Tripura Legislative Assembly election: Dharmanagar
Party	Candidate	Votes	%	±%
INC	Biswa Bandhu Sen	15,987	51.65%	▲7.18
CPI(M)	Amitabha Datta	13,577	43.86%	▼2.43
BJP	Tamal Kanti Deb	805	2.6%	▼4.73
Independent	Sanjay Chowdhury	213	0.69%	New
Margin of victory		2,410	7.79%	▲5.96
Turnout		30,952	89.93%	▲17.09
Registered electors		34,419		▼1.74
INC gain from CPI(M)		Swing	▲5.36	

=== 2003 ===
2003 Tripura Legislative Assembly election: Dharmanagar
Party	Candidate	Votes	%	±%
CPI(M)	Amitabha Datta	11,811	46.29%	▲5.65
INC	Sima Pal Chowdhury	11,345	44.47%	▲8.59
BJP	Rasik Ranjan Goswami	1,869	7.33%	▼15.76
Independent	Ranjit Lal Bhattacharya	255	1%	New
Independent	Sanjoy Chowdhury	234	0.92%	New
Margin of victory		466	1.83%	▼2.93
Turnout		25,514	72.84%	▼1.74
Registered electors		35,027		▲12.53
CPI(M) hold		Swing	▲5.65	

=== 1998 ===
1998 Tripura Legislative Assembly election: Dharmanagar
Party	Candidate	Votes	%	±%
CPI(M)	Amitabha Datta	9,434	40.64%	▼5.73
INC	Sima Pal Chowdhury	8,330	35.88%	▲1.05
BJP	Rasik Ranjan Goswami	5,359	23.09%	▲5.42
Margin of victory		1,104	4.76%	▼6.78
Turnout		23,214	74.58%	▼1.86
Registered electors		31,127		▲7
CPI(M) hold		Swing	▼5.73	

=== 1993 ===
1993 Tripura Legislative Assembly election: Dharmanagar
Party	Candidate	Votes	%	±%
CPI(M)	Amitabha Datta	10,310	46.37%	▲0.28
INC	Kalidas Dutta	7,745	34.83%	▼18.06
BJP	Rasik Ranjan Goswami	3,928	17.67%	▲17.02
Margin of victory		2,565	11.54%	▲4.74
Turnout		22,236	76.44%	▼5.56
Registered electors		29,090		▲32.74
CPI(M) gain from INC		Swing	▼6.52	

=== 1988 ===
1988 Tripura Legislative Assembly election: Dharmanagar
Party	Candidate	Votes	%	±%
INC	Kalidas Dutta	9,505	52.89%	▲13.58
CPI(M)	Amarendra Sarma	8,283	46.09%	▼5.5
BJP	Ranjit Kumar Sharma	110	0.65%	▼0.64
Margin of victory		1,222	6.8%	▼5.47
Turnout		17,970	82%	▲4.09
Registered electors		21,915		▲20.52
INC gain from CPI(M)		Swing	▲1.3%	

=== 1983 ===
1983 Tripura Legislative Assembly election: Dharmanagar
Party	Candidate	Votes	%	±%
CPI(M)	Amarendra Sarma	7,309	51.59%	▼2.35
INC	Binay Bhushan Ray	5,570	39.31%	▲15.24
Independent	Radhagobinda Dutta	1,043	7.36%	New
BJP	Jayanta Kumar Ray	178	1.26%	New
Margin of victory		1,739	12.27%	▼17.6
Turnout		14,168	77.91%	▼0.08
Registered electors		18,184		▲15.21
CPI(M) hold		Swing	▼2.35	

=== 1977 ===
1977 Tripura Legislative Assembly election: Dharmanagar
Party	Candidate	Votes	%	±%
CPI(M)	Amarendra Sarma	6,640	53.94%	New
INC	Debiprasad Purkayastha	2,963	24.07%	▼20.12
JP	Amulya Chandra Deb	1,818	14.77%	New
TPCC	Sanat Kumar Paul	888	7.21%	New
Margin of victory		3,677	29.87%	▲26.84
Turnout		12,309	77.99%	▲12.88
Registered electors		15,783		▲30.15
CPI(M) gain from Independent		Swing	▲6.73	

=== 1972 ===
1972 Tripura Legislative Assembly election: Dharmanagar
Party	Candidate	Votes	%	±%
Independent	Amarendra Sarma	3,728	47.21%	New
INC	Debiprasad Purkayastha	3,489	44.19%	New
Independent	K. Ranjan Deb Kanungo	571	7.23%	New
AIFB	Jogendra Bhusan Pal	108	1.37%	New
Margin of victory		239	3.03%	
Turnout		7,896	65.11%	
Registered electors		12,127		
Independent win (new seat)				

== See also ==
- List of constituencies of the Tripura Legislative Assembly
- North Tripura district
