= Left Front (Tripura) =

Coalition of Indian political parties

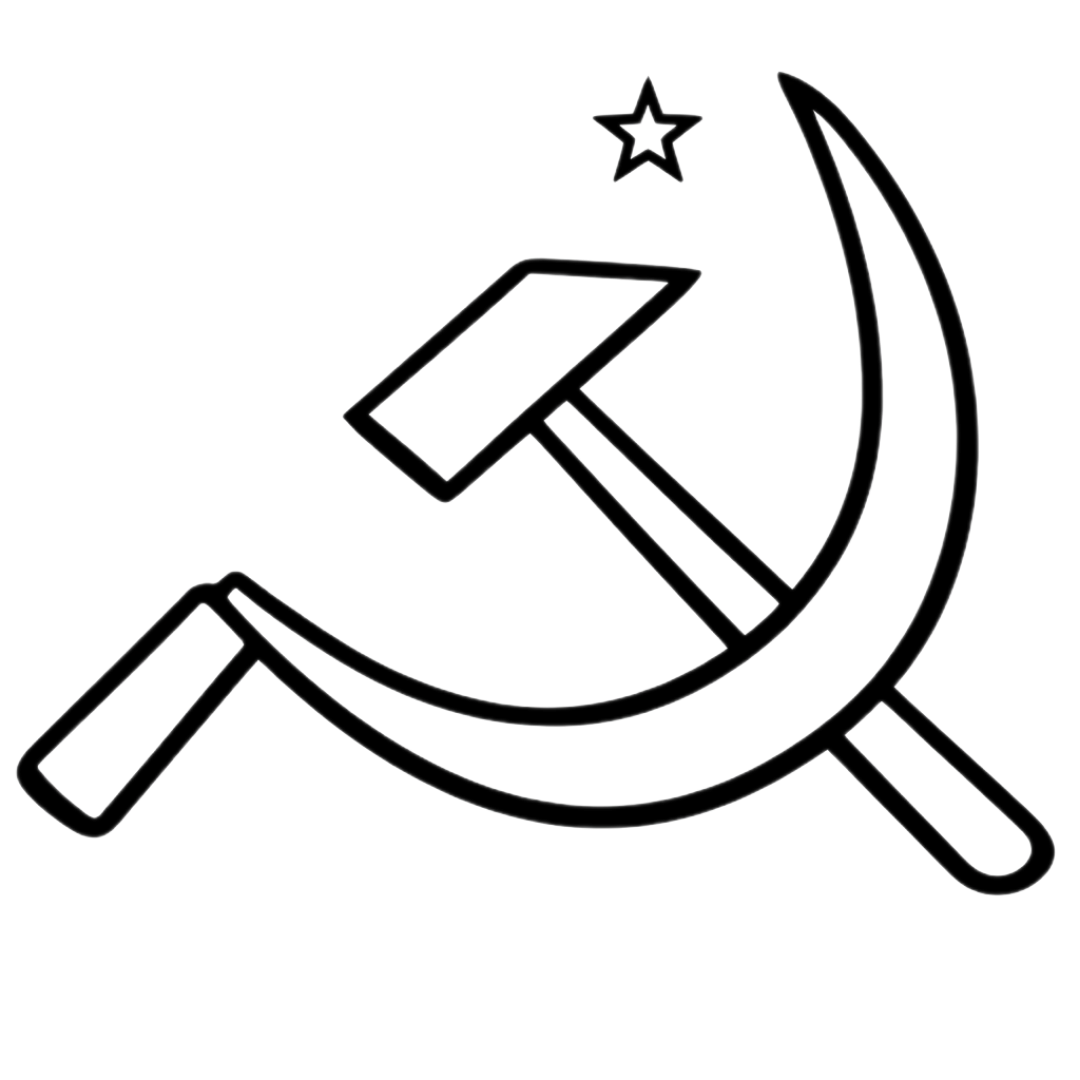
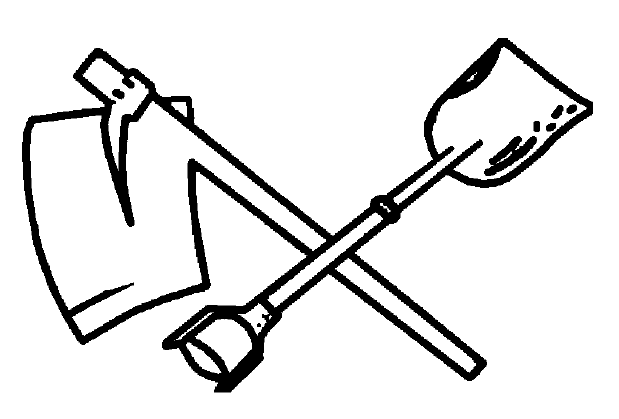
- Left Front
- Abbreviation: LF
- Leader: Jitendra Chaudhury (Leader of Opposition); Manik Dey (Convener)
- Founders: Nripen Chakraborty
- Founded: 1977; 49 years ago
- Headquarters: Melarmath, Agartala, Tripura, 799001
- Ideology: Communism; Socialism
- Political position: Left-wing to far-left
- Regional affiliation: Secular Democratic Front (SDF)
- Colours: Red
- Lok Sabha: 0 / 2
- Rajya Sabha: 0 / 2
- Tripura Legislative Assembly: 10 / 60
- Tripura Tribal Areas Autonomous District Council: 0 / 30
- Gram Panchayats: 150 / 6,370
- Panchayat Samitis: 6 / 423
- Zilla Parishads: 1 / 116
- Municipalities: 3 / 222

The Left Front is an alliance of left-wing political parties in the Indian state of Tripura. The Left Front governed Tripura from 1978–1988, and again from 1993 to 2018. The Communist Party of India (Marxist) is the dominant party in the coalition. The other members of LF are the Communist Party of India, the Revolutionary Socialist Party, and the All India Forward Bloc.

== History ==
The Left Front, then consisting of CPI, CPI(M), AIFB and RSP, won a landslide victory in the 1977 Tripura Legislative Assembly election. CPI(M) won 51 out of 60 seats in the Assembly, RSP 2, AIFB 1 and Left Front-supported independents 2. The combined Left Front votes was 390,314 (52% of the state-wide vote). In 1978 the Left Front government enacted reform of local governance, instituting an elected two-tier panchayat system. The Left Front government also enacted reforms granting official status to Kok Borok language and the creation of the Tripura Tribal Areas Autonomous District Council.

The Left Front won the 1983 Tripura Legislative Assembly election. On 11 January 1983 a 12-member Left Front cabinet with Nripen Chakraborty as Chief Minister was sworn in.

Ahead of the 1988 Tripura Legislative Assembly election Prime Minister Rajiv Gandhi charged the Left Front with having failed to contain the Tripura National Volunteers insurgency. The Indian National Congress (I) - TUJS combine won the election. Gandhi declared the entire state as a 'Disturbed Area' and in the tumultuous first 100 days of the Congress(I)-TUJS government cracked down on the Left Front. Over 2,000 Left Front activists were framed in the different cases, arrest warrants issued for 7,000 Left Front activists and CPI(M) and mass organization offices were seized or attacked across the state.

Manik Sarkar became the Chief Minister of Tripura in 1998.

In the 2000 TTAADC election the Left Front lost its majority of the council to the Indigenous People's Front of Tripura. The Left Front regained control over TTAADC in 2005. CPI(M) won 21 out of the 28 seats in the council, CPI 1, RSP and AIFB 1. The remaining 4 seats were won by the National Socialist Party of Tripura, supported by the Left Front. In 2021 and 2026, the Left Front failed to win any seats in the council and could not even come second in any seat, an all time low for the front.

However, in 2018 Tripura Legislative Assembly election, the Left Front was defeated by the Bharatiya Janata Party-Indigenous People's Front of Tripura combine, who won a landslide majority of 43 seats out of the 59 seats on which election was held and Biplab Kumar Deb of Bharatiya Janata Party became the 10th Chief Minister of Tripura.

In 2023 Tripura Legislative Assembly election, the Left Front was defeated by the Bharatiya Janata Party-Indigenous People's Front of Tripura combine, who won a landslide majority of 34 seats out of the 60 seats on which election was held. Later TMP joined the government, increasing its strength to 47.

== Members ==
Flag	Party	State Secretary / Chairman
	Communist Party of India (Marxist)	Jitendra Chaudhury
	Communist Party of India	Milan Baidya
	Revolutionary Socialist Party	Dipak Deb
	All India Forward Bloc	Paresh Chandra Sarkar

== Electoral history ==
Election	Votes	%	Seats	Notes
2003			41 / 60	
2008	9,62,617	51.18	49 / 60	(Note: AIFB didn't contest along with the Left Front)
2013	11,25,544	51.63	50 / 60	
2018	10,43,640	44.35	16 / 60	
2023	6,22,869	24.62	10 / 60	

== See also ==
- Ganamukti Parishad
- Communist Party of India (Marxist), Tripura
- Left Front (West Bengal)
- Left Democratic Front (Kerala)
- Secular Democratic Front
- List of communist parties in India
