= Ram Pada Jamatia =

Indian politician

12th Speaker of the Tripura Legislative Assembly
- Incumbent
- Assumed office 18 March 2026
- Deputy: Ram Prasad Paul
- CM: Manik Saha
- Preceded by: Biswa Bandhu Sen

Minister of Tribal Welfare and Handloom Handicrafts and Sericulture
- In office 2022–2023
- Preceded by: Mevar Kumar Jamatia
- Succeeded by: Bikash Debbarma

Member of Tripura Legislative Assembly
- Incumbent
- Assumed office 4 March 2018
- Preceded by: Naresh Chandra Jamatia
- Constituency: Bagma

Personal details
- Born: 13 February 1957 (age 69)
- Citizenship: India
- Party: Bharatiya Janata Party (BJP)
- Parent: Lt. Nimai Pada Jamatia
- Education: MBB College

Rama Pada Jamatia (born 13 February 1957) is an Indian politician from Tripura. He currently serves as the 12th Speaker of the Tripura Legislative Assembly. He formerly served as Minister of Tribal Welfare (excluding TRP & PTG) and Industry & Commerce (Handloom, Handicrafts and Sericulture) in the Government of Tripura under the Manik Saha Ministry. He first became the MLA from the Bagma Assembly Constituency by defeating CPI(M) candidate Naresh Jamatia by a margin of 2,833 votes in 2018.

== Controversy ==
- Tribal Affairs Minister Rampada Jamatia was targeted by demonstrators on Friday afternoon in Simna in the Mohanpur subdivision, a day after his motorcade was ambushed at Jampuijala tri-junction in West Tripura.
- Minister Rampada Jamatia is being criticised once more. The administration of Mohanpur subdivision hosted an administrative camp at Dargamura School in the Simna Assembly Constituency on Friday.
- An indigenous MLA from Tripura, Ram Pada Jamatia, has come out in support of the bill, much to the dismay of the state's tribal leaders, at a time when the indigenous communities of the Northeast are fuming with rage over the union cabinet's decision to clear and table the contentious Citizenship Amendment Bill (CAB), 2019, in the Parliament probably by 11 December.
