= Manik Saha ministry =

Manika Saha ministry may refer to these governments of Tripura, India headed by Manik Saha as chief minister:

- First Saha ministry (2022–2023)
- Second Saha ministry (2023–)
