= Jahar Chakraborti =

Indian politician in Tripura

Member of the Tripura Legislative Assembly
- Incumbent
- Assumed office 4 May 2026
- Preceded by: Biswa Bandhu Sen
- Constituency: Dharmanagar

Personal details
- Party: Bharatiya Janata Party
- Profession: Politician

Jahar Chakraborti is a politician from Tripura. He is a member of Tripura Legislative Assembly, from Dharmanagar Assembly constituency.
