= Pabiachhara Assembly constituency =

Legislative Assembly constituency in Tripura State, India

Coordinates: 24.16°N 92.04°E

Pabiachhara
- Constituency No. 50 for the Tripura Legislative Assembly

Constituency details
- Country: India
- Region: Northeast India
- State: Tripura
- District: Unakoti
- Lok Sabha constituency: Tripura East
- Established: 1972
- Total electors: 49,260
- Reservation: SC

Member of Legislative Assembly
- 13th Tripura Legislative Assembly
- Incumbent Bhagaban Das
- Party: Bharatiya Janata Party

Pabiachhara Legislative Assembly constituency is one of the 60 Legislative Assembly constituencies of Tripura state in India.

It comprises Kumarghat tehsil, along with parts of Machmara tehsil and Kanchanpur tehsil in Unakoti district and is reserved for candidates belonging to the Scheduled Castes.

== Members of the Legislative Assembly ==
Election	Member	Party
1972	Gopi Nath Tripura	Indian National Congress
1977	Bidhu Bhusan Malakar	Communist Party of India
1983	Bidhu Bhusan Malakar	Communist Party of India
1988	Bidhu Bhusan Malakar	Communist Party of India
1993	Bidhu Bhusan Malakar	Communist Party of India
1998	Bidhu Bhusan Malakar	Communist Party of India
2003	Bidhu Bhusan Malakar	Communist Party of India
2008	Bidhu Bhusan Malakar	Communist Party of India
2013	Samiran Malakar	Communist Party of India
2018	Bhagaban Das	Bharatiya Janata Party
2023	Bhagaban Das	Bharatiya Janata Party

== Election results ==
=== 2023 Assembly election ===
2023 Tripura Legislative Assembly election: Pabiachhara
Party	Candidate	Votes	%	±%
BJP	Bhagaban Das	19,542	44.46%	▼10.07
INC	Satyaban Das	19,134	43.53%	▲41.50
TMP	Gobinda Das	4,331	9.85%	New
NOTA	None of the Above	490	1.11%	▲0.21
Independent	Arjun Nama	455	1.04%	New
Margin of victory		408	0.93%	▼13.00
Turnout		43,952	89.34%	▼2.79
Registered electors		49,260		▲8.33
BJP hold		Swing	▼10.07	

=== 2018 Assembly election ===
2018 Tripura Legislative Assembly election: Pabiachhara
Party	Candidate	Votes	%	±%
BJP	Bhagaban Das	22,815	54.53%	▲53.07
CPI(M)	Samiran Malakar	16,988	40.60%	▼9.20
INC	Swagata Das	850	2.03%	▼44.41
NOTA	None of the Above	377	0.90%	New
Margin of victory		5,827	13.93%	▲10.56
Turnout		41,839	91.11%	▼0.58
Registered electors		45,471		▲13.32
BJP gain from CPI(M)		Swing	▲4.72	

=== 2013 Assembly election ===
2013 Tripura Legislative Assembly election: Pabiachhara
Party	Candidate	Votes	%	±%
CPI(M)	Samiran Malakar	18,504	49.81%	▼1.29
INC	Satyaban Das	17,254	46.44%	▲2.60
BJP	Bhagaban Das	543	1.46%	▼0.84
Independent	Bilas Bindu Malakar	446	1.20%	New
AMB	Pranesh Das	405	1.09%	▲0.24
Margin of victory		1,250	3.36%	▼3.90
Turnout		37,152	92.74%	▲0.59
Registered electors		40,125		
CPI(M) hold		Swing	▼1.29	

=== 2008 Assembly election ===
2008 Tripura Legislative Assembly election: Pabiachhara
Party	Candidate	Votes	%	±%
CPI(M)	Bidhu Bhusan Malakar	17,354	51.10%	▲0.85
INC	Phanindra Das	14,888	43.84%	▲1.37
BJP	Bhagaban Das	781	2.30%	▼1.90
Independent	Sukumari Malakar	648	1.91%	New
AMB	Uttam Das	290	0.85%	New
Margin of victory		2,466	7.26%	▼0.52
Turnout		33,961	92.17%	▲19.57
Registered electors		36,914		
CPI(M) hold		Swing	▲0.85	

=== 2003 Assembly election ===
2003 Tripura Legislative Assembly election: Pabiachhara
Party	Candidate	Votes	%	±%
CPI(M)	Bidhu Bhusan Malakar	12,696	50.25%	▼1.76
INC	Swapna Das	10,729	42.46%	▲6.44
BJP	Achinta Das	1,062	4.20%	▼7.36
Independent	Kalipada Das	445	1.76%	New
Independent	Samarendra Das	334	1.32%	New
Margin of victory		1,967	7.79%	▼8.20
Turnout		25,266	72.47%	▼2.06
Registered electors		34,882		▲13.39
CPI(M) hold		Swing	▼1.76	

=== 1998 Assembly election ===
1998 Tripura Legislative Assembly election: Pabiachhara
Party	Candidate	Votes	%	±%
CPI(M)	Bidhu Bhusan Malakar	11,920	52.01%	▼7.77
INC	Subal Chandra Biswas	8,256	36.03%	▼0.33
BJP	Phanindra Das	2,651	11.57%	▲8.84
Margin of victory		3,664	15.99%	▼7.44
Turnout		22,917	76.17%	▲0.10
Registered electors		30,762		▲2.70
CPI(M) hold		Swing		

=== 1993 Assembly election ===
1993 Tripura Legislative Assembly election: Pabiachhara
Party	Candidate	Votes	%	±%
CPI(M)	Bidhu Bhusan Malakar	13,322	59.78%	▲9.45
INC	Brajendra Das	8,102	36.36%	▼11.00
BJP	Ramananda Barman	607	2.72%	New
AMB	Anuj Das	117	0.53%	New
Margin of victory		5,220	23.42%	▲20.44
Turnout		22,284	75.51%	▼9.82
Registered electors		29,952		▲35.26
CPI(M) hold		Swing	▲9.45	

=== 1988 Assembly election ===
1988 Tripura Legislative Assembly election: Pabiachhara
Party	Candidate	Votes	%	±%
CPI(M)	Bidhu Bhusan Malakar	9,388	50.34%	▼0.27
INC	Jyotirmoy Malakar	8,832	47.36%	▲4.34
Independent	Ramendar Kumar Das	215	1.15%	New
Independent	Satish Chandra Das	215	1.15%	New
Margin of victory		556	2.98%	▼4.61
Turnout		18,650	85.47%	▲4.66
Registered electors		22,144		▲18.18
CPI(M) hold		Swing	▼0.27	

=== 1983 Assembly election ===
1983 Tripura Legislative Assembly election: Pabiachhara
Party	Candidate	Votes	%	±%
CPI(M)	Bidhu Bhusan Malakar	7,544	50.60%	▼3.23
INC	Subal Chandra Biswas	6,413	43.02%	▲19.16
Independent	Sailendra Das	658	4.41%	New
Independent	Nirmal Kumar Das	293	1.97%	New
Margin of victory		1,131	7.59%	▼22.40
Turnout		14,908	81.19%	▲5.62
Registered electors		18,738		▲18.97
CPI(M) hold		Swing	▼3.23	

=== 1977 Assembly election ===
1977 Tripura Legislative Assembly election: Pabiachhara
Party	Candidate	Votes	%	±%
CPI(M)	Bidhu Bhusan Malakar	6,270	53.84%	▲12.50
INC	Brajendra Das	2,778	23.85%	▼26.23
JP	Subal Chandra Biswas	1,915	16.44%	New
CPI	Bijoy Sarkar	520	4.47%	New
TPCC	Jnanendra Bhowmik	163	1.40%	New
Margin of victory		3,492	29.98%	▲21.24
Turnout		11,646	75.96%	▲15.38
Registered electors		15,750		▲16.29
CPI(M) gain from INC		Swing	▲3.75	

=== 1972 Assembly election ===
1972 Tripura Legislative Assembly election: Pabiachhara
Party	Candidate	Votes	%	±%
INC	Gopi Nath Tripura	3,973	50.09%	New
CPI(M)	K. Mohan Debbarma	3,279	41.34%	New
Independent	Nabin Reang	680	8.57%	New
Margin of victory		694	8.75%	
Turnout		7,932	60.46%	
Registered electors		13,544		
INC win (new seat)				

== See also ==
- List of constituencies of the Tripura Legislative Assembly
- Unakoti district
