= Naresh Jamatia =

Indian politician

Naresh Chandra Jamatia

Member of Tripura Legislative Assembly
- In office 2008–2018
- Preceded by: Gunapada Jamatia
- Succeeded by: Ram Pada Jamatia
- Constituency: Bagma

Minister of Forest, Rural Development and Election
- In office 2014–2018

Personal details
- Born: 16 November 1959 (age 66) Udaipur, Tripura, India
- Party: Communist Party of India (Marxist)
- Spouse: Sabita Debbarma

Naresh Chandra Jamatia (born 16 November 1959) is an Indian politician from Tripura.

== Career ==
He previously served in the Fourth Manik Sarkar ministry as Minister of Forest, Rural Development and Election. He is a former Member of the Legislative Assembly (MLA) from the Bagma constituency in the Gomati district, Tripura. He is a member of the Communist Party of India (Marxist) and is currently serving as President of Ganamukti Parishad.

== Early life and political career ==
Jamatia was born on 16 November 1959 to Gobinda Roy Jamatia and Bipra Rani Jamatia. In the 2018 Tripura Legislative Assembly election he was defeated by the BJP candidate Ram Pada Jamatia.
