= Aghore Debbarma =

Indian politician

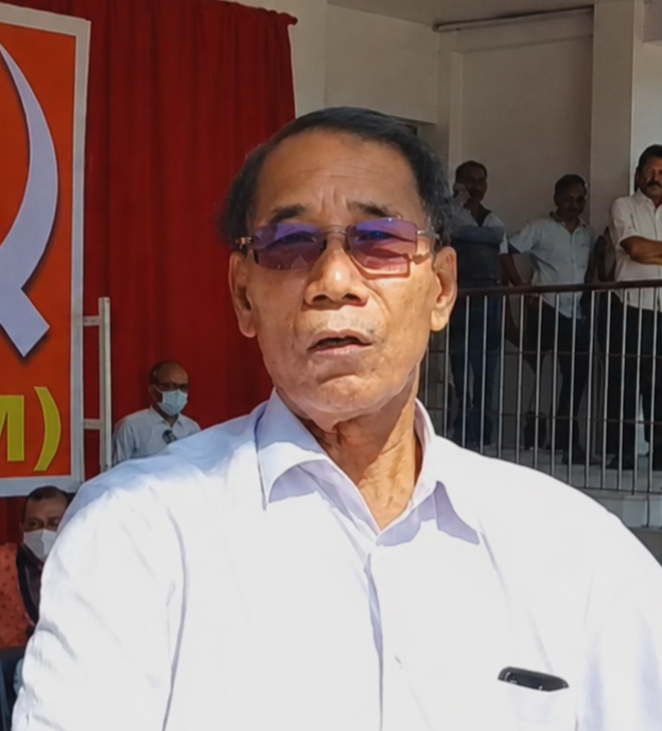
- Debbarma in 2022

Minister for Tribal Welfare, Agriculture & Animal Resource Development, Government of Tripura
- In office 2008–2018
- Succeeded by: Mevar Kumar Jamatia; Pranjit Singha Roy; Bhagaban Das

Member of Legislative Assembly, Tripura
- In office 2013–2018
- Preceded by: Sachindra Debbarma
- Succeeded by: Mevar Kumar Jamatia
- Constituency: Asharambari
- In office 2008–2013
- Preceded by: Animesh Debbarma
- Succeeded by: Manindra Chandra Das
- Constituency: Kalyanpur-Pramodenagar

Chief Executive Member, Tripura Tribal Areas Autonomous District Council
- In office 2005–2008
- Preceded by: Debabrata Koloi
- Succeeded by: Ranjit Debbarma
- In office 1985–1991

Personal details
- Born: 1 January 1951 (age 75) Khowai
- Citizenship: India
- Party: CPI(M)
- Spouse: Smt. Malati Deb Barma

Aghore Debbarma is an Indian politician and a former Agriculture minister of the Tripura state.

As a member of the Communist Party of India (Marxist) (CPI-M), he represented Asharambari Vidhan Sabha constituency of Khowai district. He served as a minister of Tripura for Agriculture, Tribal Welfare, and Animal Resource Development. He was a central committee member of CPI-M and is a leader of Gana Mukti Parishad (GMP), the Tiprasa wing of Tripura CPI-M. In 2018, he lost the Legislative Assembly election to Mevar Kumar Jamatia of Indigenous People's Front of Tripura (IPFT).

== Political career ==
In 1985 Debbarma was elected as Chief Executive Member of Tripura Tribal Areas Autonomous District Council. He was again elected to the same post in 2005. He was also a cabinet minister of Tribal Welfare, Agriculture & Animal Resource Development from 2008 to 2018. He is also a member of the Central Committee of CPI-M. Debbarma had been a member of the Central Committee of CPI-M.

== Electoral performance ==
Election	Constituency	Party	Result	Votes %	Opposition Candidate	Opposition Party	Opposition vote %	Ref
2018	Asharambari	CPI(M)	Lost	36.46%	Mevar Kumar Jamatia	IPFT	57.34%	
2013	Asharambari	CPI(M)	Won	59.55%	Amiya Kumar Debbarma	INPT	35.44%	
2008	Pramodenagar	CPI(M)	Won	54.00%	Animesh Debbarma	Independent	36.62%	
2003	Pramodenagar	CPI(M)	Lost	46.75%	Animesh Debbarma	INPT	48.52%	
1998	Pramodenagar	CPI(M)	Won	55.25%	Bahuroy (Bahu Chandra) Debbarma	INC	32.96%	
1993	Pramodenagar	CPI(M)	Won	65.75%	Biswajit Deb Rankhal	INC	33.15%	

== Awards ==
He was awarded the Krishi Karman Award 2015–16 by the Government of India.

Award title	Year
Krishi Karman Award	2015–16
