= 1998 Tripura Legislative Assembly election =

State assembly election in India

- 16 Feb 1998

60 seats in the Assembly 31 seats needed for a majority
- Registered: 1,727,463
- Turnout: 80.84%
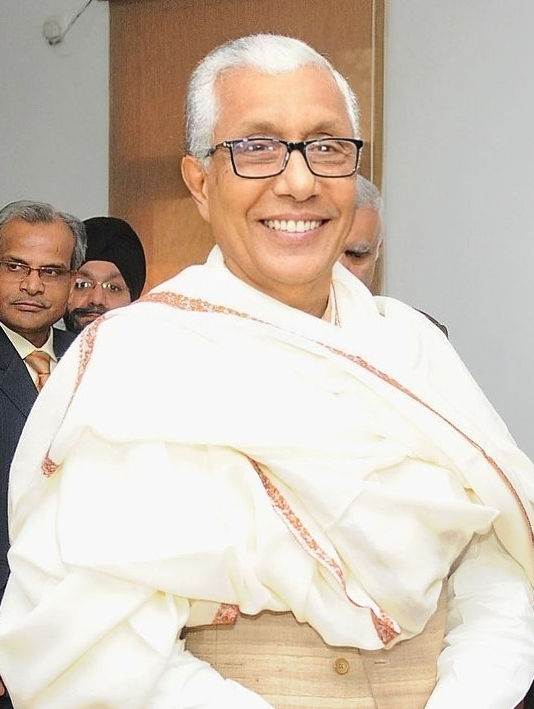

	First party	Second party
Leader	Manik Sarkar	-
Party	CPI(M)	INC
Leader's seat	Dhanpur	-
Last election	44	10
Seats won	38	13
Seat change	▼6	▲3
Popular vote	621,804	464,171
Percentage	45.49%	33.96%
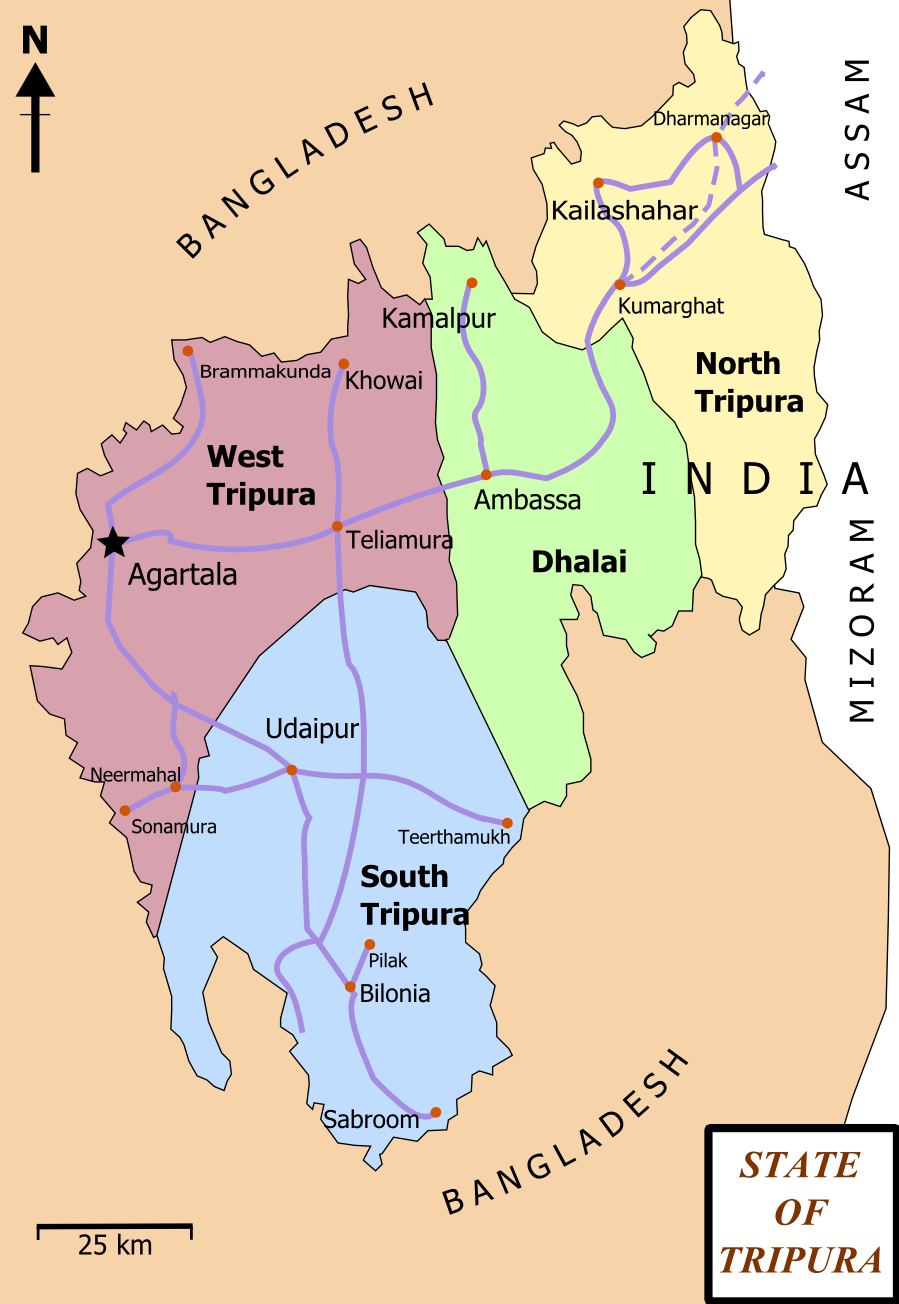
- Tripura District Map
Chief Minister before election
Dasarath Deb
CPI(M)
Elected Chief Minister
Manik Sarkar
CPI(M)

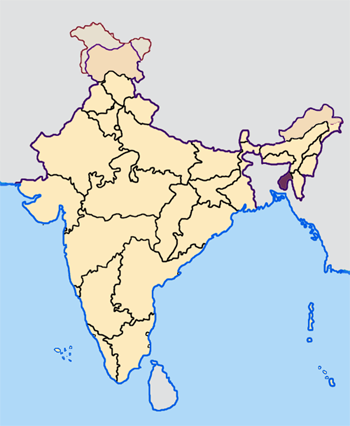
Tripura

The 1998 Tripura Legislative Assembly election took place in a single phase on 16 February to elect the Members of the Legislative Assembly (MLA) from each of the 60 Assembly Constituencies (ACs) in Tripura, India. Counting of votes occurred on 2 March 1998. The results were ready within the day.

The Communist Party of India (Marxist) (CPI(M)), led by Manik Sarkar, won 38 seats and formed a Government in Tripura

== Contesting parties ==
270 candidates registered to contest the election.

Party	Symbol	Alliance	Seats contested
Communist Party of India (Marxist) (CPI(M))		Left Front	55
Communist Party of India (CPI)		Left Front	2
Revolutionary Socialist Party (RSP)		Left Front	2
All India Forward Bloc (AIFB)		Left Front	1
Bharatiya Janata Party (BJP)		NDA	60
Indian National Congress (INC)		Congress Alliance	45
Amra Bangali			24
Tripura Upajati Juba Samiti (TUJS)			10
Rashtriya Janata Dal (RJD)			6
Janata Dal			3
Communist Party of India (Marxist–Leninist) Liberation			2
Independents (IND)			60
Total			270

== Highlights ==
Election to the Tripura Legislative Assembly were held on February 16, 1998. The election were held in a single phase for all the 60 assembly constituencies.

=== Participating Political Parties ===
#	Abbreviation	Party
National Parties
1	BJP	Bhartiya Janta Party
2	CPI	Communist Party of India
3	CPM	Communist Party of India (Marxist)
4	INC	Indian National Congress
5	JD	Janata Dal
State Parties
6	FBL	All India Forward BlocK
7	RJD	Rashtriya Janata Dal
8	RSP	Revolutionary Socialist Party
9	TUJS	Tripura Upajati Juba Samity
Registered (Unrecognised) Parties
10	AMB	Amra Bangalee
11	CPI(ML)(L)	Communist Party of India (Marxist-Lenninist) (Liberation)
Independents
12	IND	Independent

=== No. of Constituencies ===
Type of Constituencies	GEN	SC	ST	Total
No. of Constituencies	33	7	20	60

=== Electors ===
	Men	Women	Total
No.of Electors	893,538	833,925	1,727,463
No.of Electors who Voted	732,368	664,197	1,396,565
Polling Percentage	81.96%	79.65%	80.84%

=== Performance of Candidates by gender ===
	Men	Women	Total
No.of Contestants	249	21	270
Elected	58	02	60

== Results ==
=== Results by party ===
Party	Seats contested	Seats won	No. of votes	% of votes	1993 Seats
Communist Party of India (Marxist)	55	38	621,804	45.49%	44
Indian National Congress	45	13	464,171	33.96%	10
Tripura Upajati Juba Samiti	10	4	98,271	7.19%	1
Revolutionary Socialist Party	2	2	22,526	1.65%	2
Communist Party of India	2	1	18,802	1.38%	0
Bharatiya Janata Party	60	0	80,272	5.87%	0
Janata Dal	3	0	3,294	0.24%	1
Independents	60	2	44,940	3.29%	1
Total	270	60	1,366,966		
Source: ECI

=== Results by constituency ===
Winner, runner-up, voter turnout, and victory margin in every constituency
Assembly Constituency		Turnout	Winner				Runner Up				Margin
#k	Names	%	Candidate	Party	Votes	%	Candidate	Party	Votes	%	Margin
1	Simna	75.1%	Pranab Debbarma	CPI(M)	9,641	52.86%	Rabindra Debbarma	TUS	8,104	44.43%	1,537
2	Mohanpur	81.16%	Ratan Lal Nath	INC	11,864	54.54%	Samir Chakrabarti	CPI(M)	8,547	39.29%	3,317
3	Bamutia	83.39%	Prakash Chandra Das	INC	11,871	52.84%	Urmila Biswas	CPI(M)	9,691	43.14%	2,180
4	Barjala	82.06%	Dipak Kumar Roy	INC	16,229	50.81%	Chhaya Baul	CPI(M)	13,407	41.97%	2,822
5	Khayerpur	84.11%	Pabitra Kar	CPI(M)	13,226	49.1%	Sudhir Ranjan Majumder	INC	12,745	47.31%	481
6	Agartala	78.65%	Sudip Roy Barman	INC	16,098	49.%	Krishna Rakshit (Datta)	CPI(M)	14,036	42.72%	2,062
7	Ramnagar	81.39%	Surajit Datta	INC	13,303	53.28%	Madhu Sengupta	CPI(M)	9,862	39.5%	3,441
8	Town Bordowali	79.22%	Ashok Kumar Bhattacharya	INC	11,357	54.7%	Brajagopal Roy	AIFB	7,665	36.92%	3,692
9	Banamalipur	79.54%	Madhu Sudhan Saha	INC	10,051	54.29%	Prasanta Kapali	CPI	6,819	36.84%	3,232
10	Majlishpur	84.69%	Manik Dey	CPI(M)	12,552	50.39%	Dipak Nag	INC	11,692	46.94%	860
11	Mandaibazar	76.59%	Manoranjan Debbarma	CPI(M)	12,632	51.66%	Jagadish Debbarma	TUS	11,088	45.35%	1,544
12	Takarjala	76.03%	Baijayanti Kalai	CPI(M)	9,420	48.41%	Rahindra Debbarma	TUS	9,414	48.38%	6
13	Pratapgarh	82.67%	Anil Sarkar	CPI(M)	20,255	50.4%	Narayan Chandra Das	INC	17,262	42.95%	2,993
14	Badharghat	81.46%	Dilip Sarkar	INC	19,372	49.25%	Jadab Majumder	CPI(M)	17,823	45.32%	1,549
15	Kamalasagar	82.7%	Narayan Chandra Chowdhury	CPI(M)	10,907	49.82%	Matilal Sarkar	INC	10,296	47.02%	611
16	Bishalgarh	82.03%	Samir Ranjan Barman	INC	10,876	52.29%	Mati Lal Sarkar	CPI(M)	9,078	43.64%	1,798
17	Golaghati	80.39%	Niranjan Debbarma	CPI(M)	11,028	49.68%	Ashok Debbarma	INC	10,079	45.41%	949
18	Charilam	79.89%	Narayan Rupini	CPI(M)	10,815	49.6%	Ananta Debbarma	Independent	9,809	44.99%	1,006
19	Boxanagar	89.12%	Billal Miah	INC	10,645	50.12%	Sahid Chowdhury	CPI(M)	10,182	47.94%	463
20	Nalchar	86.53%	Sukumar Barman	CPI(M)	11,905	57.26%	Pulin Behari Bhowmik	INC	8,243	39.65%	3,662
21	Sonamura	86.91%	Subal Rudra	CPI(M)	10,894	50.23%	Subal Bhowmik	INC	10,205	47.05%	689
22	Dhanpur	86.38%	Manik Sarkar	CPI(M)	12,771	53.9%	Majibur Islam Majumder	INC	9,668	40.81%	3,103
23	Ramchandraghat	65.77%	Padma Kumar Debbarma	CPI(M)	9,151	73.29%	Subodh Debbarma	Independent	2,563	20.53%	6,588
24	Khowai	85.82%	Samir Deb Sarkar	CPI(M)	10,416	49.59%	Arun Kumar Kar	INC	9,785	46.59%	631
25	Asharambari	74.19%	Sandhya Rani Debbarma	CPI(M)	11,907	70.2%	Kripa Sadhan Jamatia	Independent	2,658	15.67%	9,249
26	Pramodenagar	78.24%	Aghore Debbarma	CPI(M)	12,148	55.25%	Bahuroy (Bahu Chandra) Debbarma	INC	7,246	32.96%	4,902
27	Kalyanpur	81.35%	Kajal Chandra Das	Independent	9,946	51.51%	Makhan Lal Chakraborty	CPI(M)	7,832	40.56%	2,114
28	Krishnapur	72.27%	Khagendra Jamatia	CPI(M)	9,821	54.39%	Khagendra Kumar Reang	TUS	6,568	36.37%	3,253
29	Teliamura	79.09%	Jitendra Sarkar	CPI(M)	10,789	48.09%	Gopal Chandra Roy	INC	10,457	46.61%	332
30	Bagma	82.97%	Rati Mohan Jamaitia	TUS	10,940	49.88%	Gunapada Jamatia	CPI(M)	10,333	47.11%	607
31	Salgarh	84.28%	Gopal Chandra Das	RSP	12,238	53.%	Chandra Mohan Biswas	INC	10,106	43.77%	2,132
32	Radhakishorpur	80.19%	Joy Gobinda Deb Roy	RSP	10,288	47.55%	Dhirendra Kumar Sen	INC	10,101	46.68%	187
33	Matarbari	84.84%	Kashiram Reang	INC	12,016	50.12%	Madhab Chandra Saha	CPI(M)	11,171	46.6%	845
34	Kakraban	82.94%	Kashab Chandra Majumder	CPI(M)	12,096	56.04%	Gouranga Dhar	INC	8,455	39.17%	3,641
35	Rajnagar	87.79%	Sudhan Das	CPI(M)	16,831	60.1%	Laxman Malakar	INC	10,313	36.83%	6,518
36	Belonia	87.63%	Basudev Majumder	CPI(M)	12,409	52.21%	Amal Mallik	INC	10,552	44.4%	1,857
37	Santirbazar	83.44%	Durbajoy Reang	CPI	11,983	47.85%	Gauri Sankar Reang	TUS	11,890	47.48%	93
38	Hrishyamukh	87.92%	Badal Chowdhury	CPI(M)	15,999	66.18%	Dilip Chowdhury	INC	7,506	31.05%	8,493
39	Jolaibari	84.43%	Gitamohan Tripura	CPI(M)	11,554	64.36%	Brajendra Mog Chowdhury	INC	5,494	30.61%	6,060
40	Manu	85.36%	Jitendra Chaudhury	CPI(M)	16,236	55.8%	Joykishore Tripura	INC	12,504	42.97%	3,732
41	Sabroom	85.6%	Gour Kanti Goswami	CPI(M)	15,507	59.34%	Manoranjan Debnath	INC	10,121	38.73%	5,386
42	Ampinagar	78.02%	Nagendra Jamatia	TUS	11,054	52.09%	Upaharan Jamatia	CPI(M)	9,674	45.58%	1,380
43	Birganj	83.42%	Jawahar Shaha	INC	13,543	49.94%	Ranjit Debnath	CPI(M)	13,084	48.25%	459
44	Raima Valley	75.73%	Rabindra Debbarma	TUS	12,987	53.39%	Ananda Mohan Roaja	CPI(M)	10,631	43.7%	2,356
45	Kamalpur	84.85%	Bimal Sinha	CPI(M)	9,255	51.36%	Gouranga Chandra Ghosh	INC	7,722	42.85%	1,533
46	Surma	81.56%	Sudhir Das	CPI(M)	10,344	51.23%	Surjalal Das	INC	8,667	42.92%	1,677
47	Salema	80.99%	Prasanta Debbarma	CPI(M)	9,996	52.57%	Sachindra Debbarma	TUS	7,604	39.99%	2,392
48	Kulai	74.72%	Bijoy Kumar Hrangkhawl	Independent	10,377	50.18%	Gitya Kumar Reang	CPI(M)	8,255	39.92%	2,122
49	Chawamanu	70.56%	Shyama Charan Tripura	TUS	8,622	49.09%	Purna Mohan Tripura	CPI(M)	7,853	44.71%	769
50	Pabiachhara	76.17%	Bidhu Bhusan Malakar	CPI(M)	11,920	52.01%	Subal Chandra Biswas	INC	8,256	36.03%	3,664
51	Fatikroy	79.76%	Ananta Pal	CPI(M)	9,342	46.08%	Sujit Paul	INC	8,677	42.8%	665
52	Chandipur	83.91%	Baidyanath Majumdar	CPI(M)	12,553	55.2%	Debasish Sen	INC	8,630	37.95%	3,923
53	Kailashahar	82.63%	Birajit Sinha	INC	12,360	49.12%	Tapan Chakraborty	CPI(M)	11,333	45.04%	1,027
54	Kurti	81.59%	Faizur Rahaman	CPI(M)	9,498	44.19%	Abdul Matin Chowdhury	INC	9,319	43.35%	179
55	Kadamtala	78.91%	Umesh Chandra Nath	CPI(M)	7,207	35.98%	Jyotirmoy Nath	INC	6,447	32.18%	760
56	Dharmanagar	76.08%	Amitabha Datta	CPI(M)	9,434	40.64%	Sima Pal Chowdhury	INC	8,330	35.88%	1,104
57	Jubarajnagar	82.42%	Ramendra Chandra Debnath	CPI(M)	9,496	45.65%	Biva Rani Nath	INC	9,209	44.27%	287
58	Pencharthal	74.43%	Anil Chakma	CPI(M)	11,257	48.18%	Nirupama Chakma	INC	8,944	38.28%	2,313
59	Panisagar	76.58%	Subodh Chandra Das	CPI(M)	8,852	45.77%	Kalidas Dutta	INC	6,988	36.13%	1,864
60	Kanchanpur	69.8%	Binduram Reang	CPI(M)	8,948	44.78%	Nanjira Reang	BJP	4,785	23.95%	4,163

== Government Formation ==
The Communist Party of India (Marxist) (CPI(M)), led by Manik Sarkar, won 38 seats and formed a Government in Tripura
