= Asharambari Assembly constituency =

Legislative Assembly constituency in Tripura State, India

Coordinates: 24.18°N 91.67°E

Asharambari
- Constituency No. 26 for the Tripura Legislative Assembly

Constituency details
- Country: India
- Region: Northeast India
- State: Tripura
- District: Khowai
- Lok Sabha constituency: Tripura East
- Established: 1972
- Total electors: 39,901
- Reservation: ST

Member of Legislative Assembly
- 13th Tripura Legislative Assembly
- Incumbent Animesh Debbarma
- Party: TMP
- Alliance: NDA
- Elected year: 2023

Asharambari is one of the 60 Legislative Assembly constituencies of Tripura state in India. It is part of Khowai district and is reserved for candidates belonging to the Scheduled Tribes. It is also part of East Tripura Lok Sabha constituency.

== Members of the Legislative Assembly ==
Election	Member	Party
1972	Nripen Chakraborty	Communist Party of India
1977	Bidya Chandra Debbarma	Communist Party of India
1983	Bidya Chandra Debbarma	Communist Party of India
1988	Bidya Chandra Debbarma	Communist Party of India
1993	Bidya Chandra Debbarma	Communist Party of India
1998	Sandhya Rani Debbarma	Communist Party of India
2003	Sachindra Debbarma	Communist Party of India
2008	Sachindra Debbarma	Communist Party of India
2013	Aghore Debbarma	Communist Party of India
2018	Mevar Kumar Jamatia	Indigenous People's Front of Tripura
2023	Animesh Debbarma	Tipra Motha Party

== Election results ==
=== 2023 Assembly election ===
2023 Tripura Legislative Assembly election: Asharambari
Party	Candidate	Votes	%	±%
TMP	Animesh Debbarma	23,838	66.56%	New
IPFT	Jayanti Debbarma	5,510	15.38%	▼41.96
CPI(M)	Dilip Debbarma	4,420	12.34%	New
Independent	Archana Urang	1,125	3.14%	New
NOTA	None of the Above	490	1.37%	▼0.12
Independent	Jappu Debbarma	432	1.21%	New
Margin of victory		18,328	51.17%	▲30.29
Turnout		35,815	89.81%	▼2.14
Registered electors		39,901		▲9.58
TMP gain from IPFT		Swing	▲9.22	

=== 2018 Assembly election ===
2018 Tripura Legislative Assembly election: Asharambari
Party	Candidate	Votes	%	±%
IPFT	Mevar Kumar Jamatia	19,188	57.34%	New
CPI(M)	Aghore Debbarma	12,201	36.46%	▼23.09
Tipraland State Party	Dilip Kumar Munda	501	1.50%	New
NOTA	None of the Above	499	1.49%	New
INC	Surendra Debbarma	435	1.30%	New
Independent	Rajesh Kumar Debbarma	290	0.87%	New
AMB	Suchitra Debbarma	282	0.84%	New
Margin of victory		6,987	20.88%	▼3.23
Turnout		33,463	91.77%	▼0.95
Registered electors		36,413		▲12.95
IPFT gain from CPI(M)		Swing	▼2.21	

=== 2013 Assembly election ===
2013 Tripura Legislative Assembly election: Asharambari
Party	Candidate	Votes	%	±%
CPI(M)	Aghore Debbarma	17,826	59.55%	▲2.77
INPT	Amiya Kumar Debbarma	10,609	35.44%	▼2.65
BJP	Dhanabhakti Jamatia	815	2.72%	▲0.99
Independent	Dinesh Debbarma	684	2.29%	New
Margin of victory		7,217	24.11%	▲5.42
Turnout		29,934	92.92%	▲0.41
Registered electors		32,239		
CPI(M) hold		Swing	▲2.77	

=== 2008 Assembly election ===
2008 Tripura Legislative Assembly election: Asharambari
Party	Candidate	Votes	%	±%
CPI(M)	Sachindra Debbarma	13,765	56.78%	▲2.74
INPT	Amiya Kumar Debbarma	9,234	38.09%	▼7.86
Independent	Prafulla Debbarma	441	1.82%	New
BJP	Dhanbhakti Jamatia	419	1.73%	New
Independent	Ashit Debbarma	383	1.58%	New
Margin of victory		4,531	18.69%	▲10.60
Turnout		24,242	92.50%	▲16.42
Registered electors		26,225		
CPI(M) hold		Swing	▲2.74	

=== 2003 Assembly election ===
2003 Tripura Legislative Assembly election: Asharambari
Party	Candidate	Votes	%	±%
CPI(M)	Sachindra Debbarma	9,924	54.05%	▼16.15
INPT	Amiya Kumar Debbarma	8,438	45.95%	New
Margin of victory		1,486	8.09%	▼46.43
Turnout		18,362	76.07%	▲4.00
Registered electors		24,154		▲2.55
CPI(M) hold		Swing		

=== 1998 Assembly election ===
1998 Tripura Legislative Assembly election: Asharambari
Party	Candidate	Votes	%	±%
CPI(M)	Sandhya Rani Debbarma	11,907	70.20%	▼10.06
Independent	Kripa Sadhan Jamatia	2,658	15.67%	New
BJP	Umesh Debbarma	2,078	12.25%	New
AMB	Chandra Mani Debbarma	319	1.88%	▼3.04
Margin of victory		9,249	54.53%	▼12.70
Turnout		16,962	74.19%	▼8.34
Registered electors		23,553		▲2.50
CPI(M) hold		Swing	▼10.06	

=== 1993 Assembly election ===
1993 Tripura Legislative Assembly election: Asharambari
Party	Candidate	Votes	%	±%
CPI(M)	Bidya Chandra Debbarma	14,820	80.26%	▲3.06
INC	Sudhir Debbarma	2,407	13.04%	▼6.64
AMB	Ranita Sangma	908	4.92%	New
Independent	Subash Debbarma	330	1.79%	New
Margin of victory		12,413	67.22%	▲9.70
Turnout		18,465	81.43%	▼3.82
Registered electors		22,979		▲18.54
CPI(M) hold		Swing	▲3.06	

=== 1988 Assembly election ===
1988 Tripura Legislative Assembly election: Asharambari
Party	Candidate	Votes	%	±%
CPI(M)	Bidya Chandra Debbarma	12,597	77.20%	▼2.47
INC	Arun Kumar Debbarma	3,211	19.68%	▲8.52
Independent	Sishu Ranjan Roy	243	1.49%	New
JP	Soumyendu Debbarma	145	0.89%	New
Independent	Joy Kumar Debbarma	121	0.74%	New
Margin of victory		9,386	57.52%	▼10.99
Turnout		16,317	85.21%	▼0.33
Registered electors		19,385		▲14.88
CPI(M) hold		Swing	▼2.47	

=== 1983 Assembly election ===
1983 Tripura Legislative Assembly election: Asharambari
Party	Candidate	Votes	%	±%
CPI(M)	Bidya Chandra Debbarma	11,360	79.67%	▲1.97
INC	Kishalaya Kanti Debbarma	1,591	11.16%	▲1.96
Independent	Sudhangshu Sen	1,308	9.17%	New
Margin of victory		9,769	68.51%	▲0.01
Turnout		14,259	85.91%	▲2.88
Registered electors		16,874		▲12.58
CPI(M) hold		Swing		

=== 1977 Assembly election ===
1977 Tripura Legislative Assembly election: Asharambari
Party	Candidate	Votes	%	±%
CPI(M)	Bidya Chandra Debbarma	9,506	77.70%	▲18.78
INC	Dayanand Debbarma	1,125	9.19%	▼29.56
JP	Jogendra Debbarma	711	5.81%	New
TPCC	Sachindra Debbarma	622	5.08%	New
TUS	Subodh Debbarma	271	2.21%	New
Margin of victory		8,381	68.50%	▲48.33
Turnout		12,235	82.94%	▲1.72
Registered electors		14,989		▲12.18
CPI(M) hold		Swing	▲18.78	

=== 1972 Assembly election ===
1972 Tripura Legislative Assembly election: Asharambari
Party	Candidate	Votes	%	±%
CPI(M)	Nripen Chakraborty	6,290	58.92%	New
INC	Arun Kar	4,137	38.75%	New
Independent	Daya Nanda Debbarma	249	2.33%	New
Margin of victory		2,153	20.17%	
Turnout		10,676	82.01%	
Registered electors		13,361		
CPI(M) win (new seat)				

== See also ==
- List of constituencies of the Tripura Legislative Assembly
- Khowai district
- Tripura East (Lok Sabha constituency)
