= 2003 Tripura Legislative Assembly election =

Indian state assembly election

- 26 Feb 2003

All 60 seats in the Assembly 31 seats needed for a majority
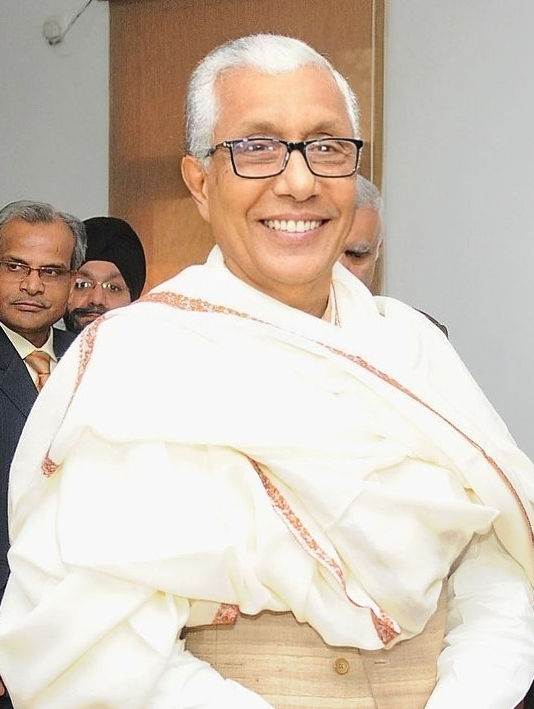

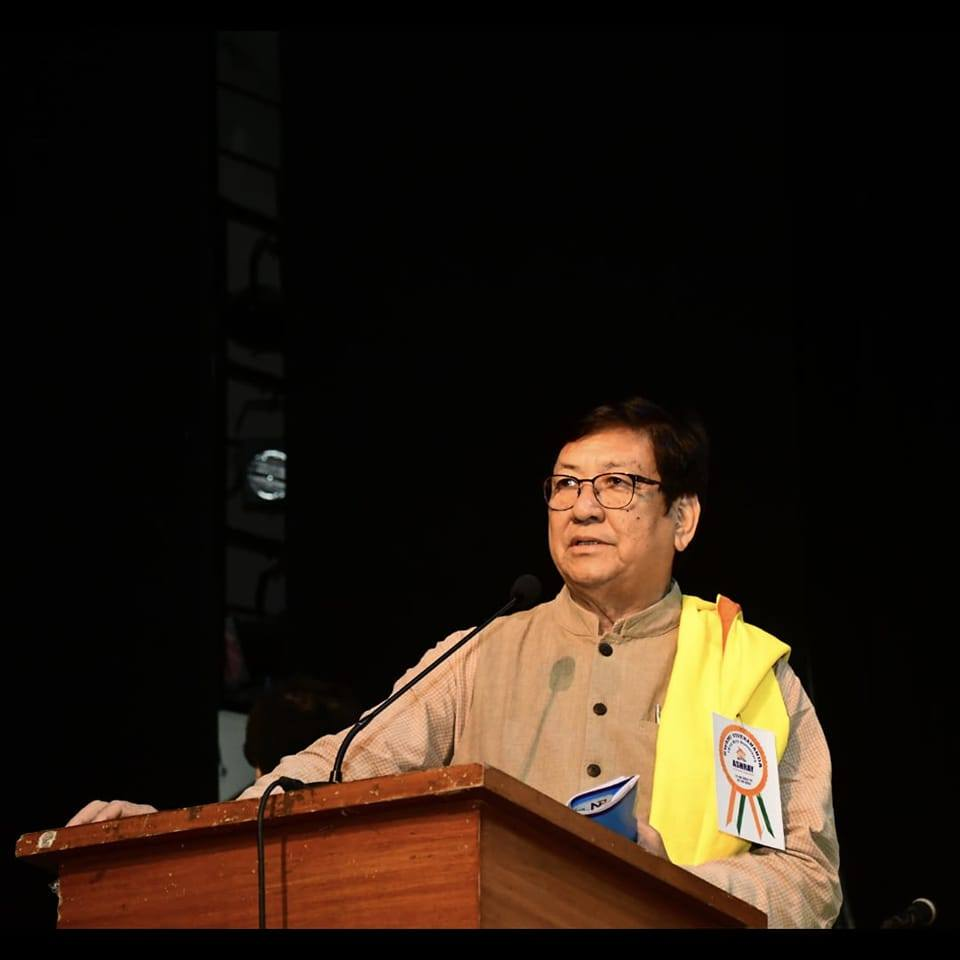
	First party	Second party
Leader	Manik Sarkar	Birajit Sinha
Party	CPI(M)	INC
Leader's seat	Dhanpur	Kailasahar
Last election	38	13
Seats won	38	13
Seat change	Steady	Steady
Popular vote	711,119	498,749
Percentage	46.82%	32.84%
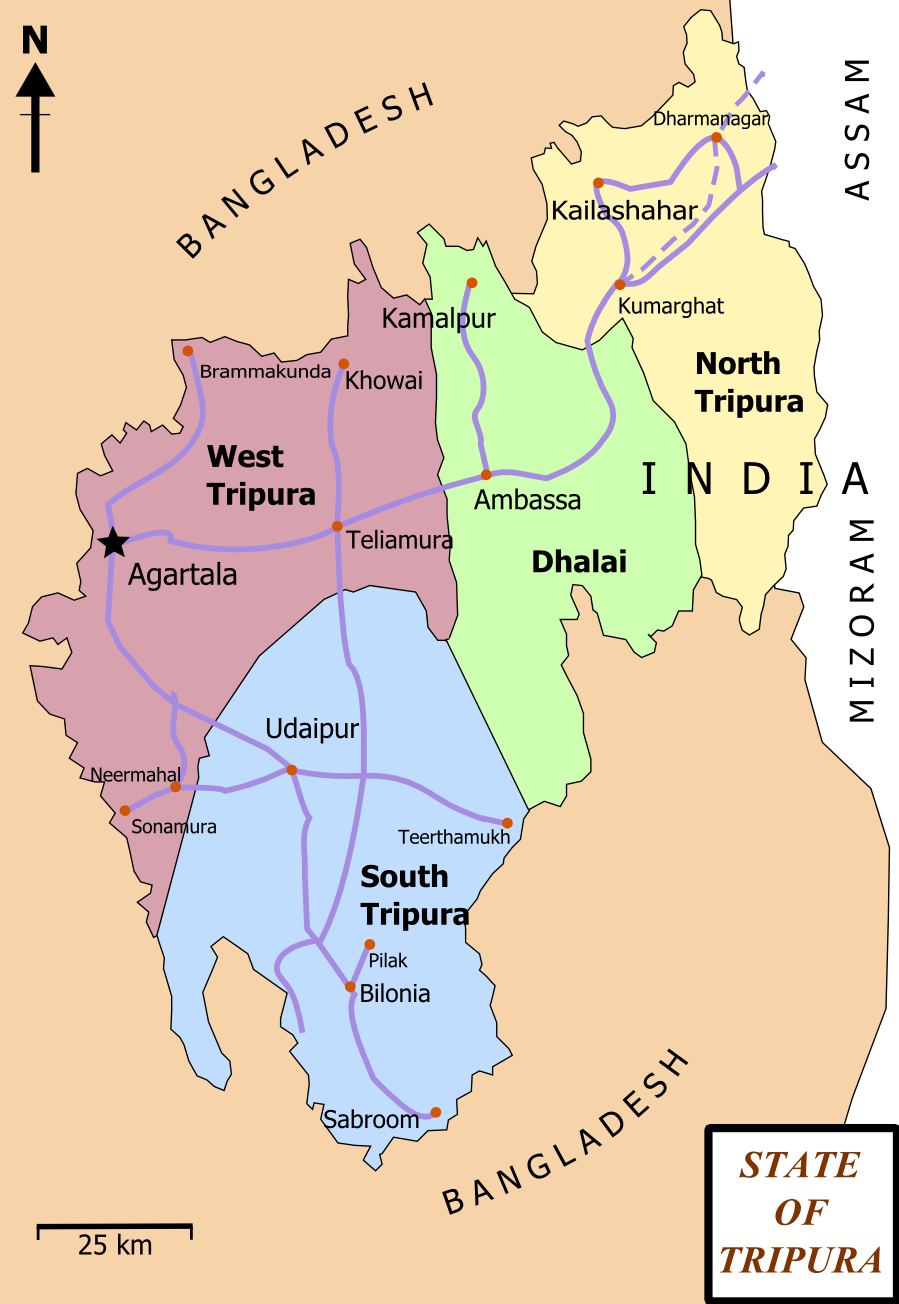
- Tripura District Map
CM before election
Manik Sarkar
CPI(M)
Elected CM
Manik Sarkar
CPI(M)

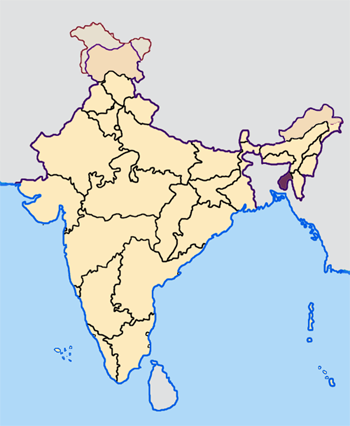
Tripura

The 2003 Tripura Legislative Assembly election took place in a single phase on 26 February to elect the Members of the Legislative Assembly (MLA) from each of the 60 Assembly Constituencies in Tripura, India. The counting of votes occurred on 1 March 2003. The results were ready within the day.

The Communist Party of India (Marxist) (CPI(M)), led by Manik Sarkar, won 38 seats and formed the government in Tripura

== Contesting parties ==
254 candidates registered to contest the election.

Party	Symbol	Alliance	Seats contested
Communist Party of India (Marxist) (CPI(M))		Left Front	55
Communist Party of India (CPI)		Left Front	2
Revolutionary Socialist Party (RSP)		Left Front	2
All India Forward Bloc (AIFB)		Left Front	1
Indian National Congress (INC)		Congress Alliance	42
Bharatiya Janata Party (BJP)		NDA	21
Indigenous Nationalist Party of Twipra (INPT)			18
All India Trinamool Congress			18
Nationalist Congress Party		Congress Alliance	12
Lok Janshakti Party			10
Amra Bangali			9
Communist Party of India (Marxist–Leninist) Liberation			8
Janata Dal (United)		NDA	4
Independents (IND)			52
Total			254

== Highlights ==
Election to all 60 constituencies of the Tripura Legislative Assembly were held on February 26, 2003, in a single phase.

=== Participating Political Parties ===
Partytype Abbreviation	Party	
National Parties
1	BJP	Bhartiya Janta Party
2	CPI	Communist Party of India
3	CPM	Communist Party of India (Marxist)
4	INC	Indian National Congress
5	NCP	Nationalist Congress Party
State Parties
6	AITC	All India Trinamool Congress
7	INPT	Indigenous Nationalist Party of Twipra
8	RSP	Revolutionary Socialist Party
State Parties - Other States
9	CPI(ML)(L)	Communist Party of India (Marxist–Leninist) (Liberation)
10	FBL	All India Forward Bloc
11	JD(U)	Janata Dal (United)
Registered (Unrecognised) Parties
12	AMB	Amra Bangalee
13	LJNSP	Lok Jan Shakti Party
Independents
14	IND	Independent

=== No. of Constituencies ===
Type of Constituencies	GEN	SC	ST	Total
No. of Constituencies	33	7	20	60

=== Electors ===
	Men	Women	Total
No.of Electors	1,000,309	931,411	1,931,720
No.of Electors who Voted	809,492	710,925	1,520,417
Polling Percentage	80.92%	76.33%	78.71%

=== Performance of Women Candidates ===
	Men	Women	Total
No.of Contestants	235	19	254
Elected	58	02	60

== Results ==
=== Results by party ===
Party	Seats contested	Seats won	No. of votes	% of votes	1998 Seats
Communist Party of India (Marxist)	55	38	711,119	46.82%	38
Indian National Congress	42	13	498,749	32.84%	13
Indigenous Nationalist Party of Twipra	18	6	189,186	12.46%	4
Revolutionary Socialist Party	2	2	28,688	1.89%	2
Communist Party of India	2	1	23,443	1.54%	1
Bharatiya Janata Party	21	0	20,032	1.32%	0
All India Trinamool Congress	18	0	6,493	0.43%	0
Nationalist Congress Party	12	0	4,553	0.30%	0
Independents	52	0	12,788	0.84%	2
Total	254	60	1,518,789		
Source: ECI

=== Results by constituency ===
Winner, runner-up, voter turnout, and victory margin in every constituency
Assembly Constituency		Turnout	Winner				Runner Up				Margin
#k	Names	%	Candidate	Party	Votes	%	Candidate	Party	Votes	%	Margin
1	Simna	73.91%	Pranab Debbarma	CPI(M)	10,686	51.32%	Rabindra Debbarma	INPT	9,666	46.42%	1,020
2	Mohanpur	76.99%	Ratan Lal Nath	INC	12,947	56.95%	Sanjit Debnath	CPI(M)	8,974	39.48%	3,973
3	Bamutia	81.45%	Prakash Chandra Das	INC	13,170	50.46%	Haricharan Sarkar	CPI(M)	12,539	48.04%	631
4	Barjala	81.96%	Dipak Kumar Roy	INC	18,851	50.26%	Kalyani Dey(Mitra)	CPI(M)	17,821	47.51%	1,030
5	Khayerpur	79.5%	Pabitra Kar	CPI(M)	16,429	57.01%	Lakhsmi Nag	INC	12,390	42.99%	4,039
6	Agartala	75.88%	Sudip Roy Barman	INC	18,656	52.24%	Sankar Das	CPI(M)	16,046	44.94%	2,610
7	Ramnagar	75.89%	Surajit Datta	INC	14,431	54.1%	Samir Chakraborty	CPI(M)	11,608	43.51%	2,823
8	Town Bordowali	73.74%	Ashok Kumar Bhattacharya	INC	12,010	53.16%	Brajagopal Roy	AIFB	9,844	43.57%	2,166
9	Banamalipur	73.4%	Gopal Chandra Roy	INC	10,437	52.03%	Prashanta Kapali	CPI	8,907	44.4%	1,530
10	Majlishpur	81.93%	Manik Dey	CPI(M)	14,908	53.8%	Dipak Nag	INC	12,144	43.83%	2,764
11	Mandaibazar	69.73%	Manoranjan Debbarma	CPI(M)	13,448	52.85%	Jagadish Debbarma	INPT	11,998	47.15%	1,450
12	Takarjala	62.11%	Rajeshwar Debbarma	INPT	12,784	77.75%	Baijayanti Kalai	CPI(M)	3,101	18.86%	9,683
13	Pratapgarh	80.96%	Anil Sarkar	CPI(M)	24,638	54.26%	Narayan Das	INC	18,784	41.37%	5,854
14	Badharghat	80.01%	Subrata Chakraborty	CPI(M)	22,773	49.21%	Dilip Sarkar	INC	21,825	47.16%	948
15	Kamalasagar	82.1%	Narayan Chandra Chowdhury	CPI(M)	13,936	54.86%	Arun Bhowmik	INC	10,615	41.79%	3,321
16	Bishalgarh	83.33%	Samir Ranjan Barman	INC	12,414	51.24%	Bhanu Lal Saha	CPI(M)	10,820	44.66%	1,594
17	Golaghati	71.86%	Ashok Debbarma	INC	10,080	48.55%	Niranjan Debbarma	CPI(M)	10,079	48.54%	1
18	Charilam	74.2%	Narayan Rupini	CPI(M)	10,573	48.07%	Narendra Chandra Debbarma	INPT	10,517	47.81%	56
19	Boxanagar	86.2%	Sahid Chowdhury	CPI(M)	13,051	53.5%	Billal Miah	INC	10,735	44.01%	2,316
20	Nalchar	82.98%	Sukumar Barman	CPI(M)	13,220	56.18%	Nani Gopal Das	INC	9,648	41.%	3,572
21	Sonamura	85.83%	Subal Rudra	CPI(M)	13,455	52.3%	Sudhir Ranjan Majumder	INC	11,704	45.49%	1,751
22	Dhanpur	84.23%	Manik Sarkar	CPI(M)	15,613	55.85%	Dipak Chakraborty	INC	11,111	39.74%	4,502
23	Ramchandraghat	76.59%	Padma Kumar Debbarma	CPI(M)	9,003	60.03%	Ananta Debbarma	INPT	5,569	37.13%	3,434
24	Khowai	85.7%	Samir Deb Sarkar	CPI(M)	13,511	55.78%	Arun Kumar Kar	INC	10,084	41.63%	3,427
25	Asharambari	76.07%	Sachindra Debbarma	CPI(M)	9,924	54.05%	Amiya Kumar Debbarma	INPT	8,438	45.95%	1,486
26	Pramodenagar	73.08%	Animesh Debbarma	INPT	10,607	48.52%	Aghore Debbarma	CPI(M)	10,220	46.75%	387
27	Kalyanpur	76.43%	Kajal Chandra Das	INC	10,290	50.64%	Manindra Chandra Das	CPI(M)	9,110	44.83%	1,180
28	Krishnapur	69.98%	Khagendra Jamatia	CPI(M)	9,922	50.09%	Sabda Kumar Jamatia	INPT	8,885	44.86%	1,037
29	Teliamura	78.%	Ashok Kumar Baidya	INC	12,579	51.7%	Jitendra Sarkar	CPI(M)	10,856	44.62%	1,723
30	Bagma	80.52%	Gunapada Jamatia	CPI(M)	12,588	50.15%	Rati Mohan Jamaitia	INPT	12,513	49.85%	75
31	Salgarh	84.27%	Gopal Chandra Das	RSP	15,756	58.3%	Mira Das	INC	10,643	39.38%	5,113
32	Radhakishorpur	83.96%	Joy Gobinda Deb Roy	RSP	12,932	50.21%	Pranjit Singha Roy	INC	12,048	46.78%	884
33	Matarbari	85.66%	Madhab Chandra Saha	CPI(M)	14,304	52.61%	Kashiram Reang	INC	12,333	45.36%	1,971
34	Kakraban	84.21%	Kashab Chandra Majumder	CPI(M)	15,736	62.8%	Rajib Samaddar	INC	8,573	34.21%	7,163
35	Rajnagar	87.02%	Sudhan Das	CPI(M)	19,462	61.93%	Bikash Chandra Das	INC	10,727	34.13%	8,735
36	Belonia	84.65%	Basudev Majumder	CPI(M)	15,419	59.13%	Babul Majumder	INC	9,469	36.31%	5,950
37	Santirbazar	80.38%	Manindra Reang	CPI	14,536	53.04%	Rana Kishore Reang	INPT	12,106	44.17%	2,430
38	Hrishyamukh	87.37%	Badal Chowdhury	CPI(M)	18,052	66.76%	Dilip Chowdhury	INC	7,987	29.54%	10,065
39	Jolaibari	81.21%	Jashabir Tripura	CPI(M)	11,324	59.52%	Mever Kumar Jamatia	INPT	6,820	35.85%	4,504
40	Manu	85.%	Jitendra Chaudhury	CPI(M)	17,358	55.31%	Chandan Tripura	INPT	13,253	42.23%	4,105
41	Sabroom	85.64%	Gour Kanti Goswami	CPI(M)	16,445	58.54%	Sankar Malla	INC	10,861	38.67%	5,584
42	Ampinagar	76.05%	Nagendra Jamatia	INPT	11,439	51.04%	Nakshatra Jamatia	CPI(M)	10,975	48.96%	464
43	Birganj	83.67%	Ranjit Debnath	CPI(M)	16,310	54.59%	Jawhar Shaha	INC	13,070	43.74%	3,240
44	Raima Valley	74.13%	Rabindra Debbarma	INPT	13,483	47.98%	Lalit Mohan Tripura	CPI(M)	13,334	47.45%	149
45	Kamalpur	83.38%	Bijoy Lakshmi Singha	CPI(M)	11,208	54.86%	Manoj Kanti Deb	INC	8,639	42.28%	2,569
46	Surma	80.21%	Sudhir Das	CPI(M)	12,865	55.74%	Harendra Chandra Das	INC	9,626	41.71%	3,239
47	Salema	80.71%	Prasanta Debbarma	CPI(M)	13,007	59.02%	Ajit Debbarma	INPT	8,285	37.59%	4,722
48	Kulai	71.53%	Bijoy Kumar Hrangkhawl	INPT	12,772	55.07%	Bijoy Kumar Debbarma	CPI(M)	8,792	37.91%	3,980
49	Chawamanu	65.97%	Shyama Charan Tripura	INPT	10,352	54.3%	Gajendra Tripura	CPI(M)	7,277	38.17%	3,075
50	Pabiachhara	72.47%	Bidhu Bhusan Malakar	CPI(M)	12,696	50.25%	Swapna Das	INC	10,729	42.46%	1,967
51	Fatikroy	78.96%	Bijoy Roy	CPI(M)	11,381	49.91%	Sujit Paul	INC	10,144	44.48%	1,237
52	Chandipur	82.56%	Tapan Chakraborty	CPI(M)	14,010	55.72%	Debasish Sen	INC	10,277	40.88%	3,733
53	Kailashahar	80.57%	Birajit Sinha	INC	14,751	52.5%	Inuch Mia Khadim	CPI(M)	12,750	45.38%	2,001
54	Kurti	81.37%	Faizur Rahaman	CPI(M)	12,495	50.41%	Abdul Matin Chowdhury	INC	11,484	46.33%	1,011
55	Kadamtala	77.89%	Jyotirmoy Nath	INC	9,847	42.46%	Subodh Nath	CPI(M)	9,795	42.24%	52
56	Dharmanagar	73.%	Amitabha Datta	CPI(M)	11,811	46.29%	Sima Pal Chowdhury	INC	11,345	44.47%	466
57	Jubarajnagar	80.33%	Ramendra Chandra Debnath	CPI(M)	11,967	49.61%	Biva Rani Nath	INC	11,363	47.1%	604
58	Pencharthal	71.49%	Arun Kumar Chakma	CPI(M)	12,863	48.51%	Nirupama Chakma	INC	10,790	40.69%	2,073
59	Panisagar	75.78%	Subodh Chandra Das	CPI(M)	10,931	48.57%	Bikash Sharma	INC	9,138	40.61%	1,793
60	Kanchanpur	64.25%	Rajendra Reang (Tripura politician)	CPI(M)	9,700	44.37%	Rajendra Reang	INPT	9,699	44.36%	1

== Government Formation ==
The 18 member Left Front ministry led by Chief Minister Manik Sarkar, sworn in on 7 March 2003.
