= Animesh Debbarma =

Indian politician (born 1970)

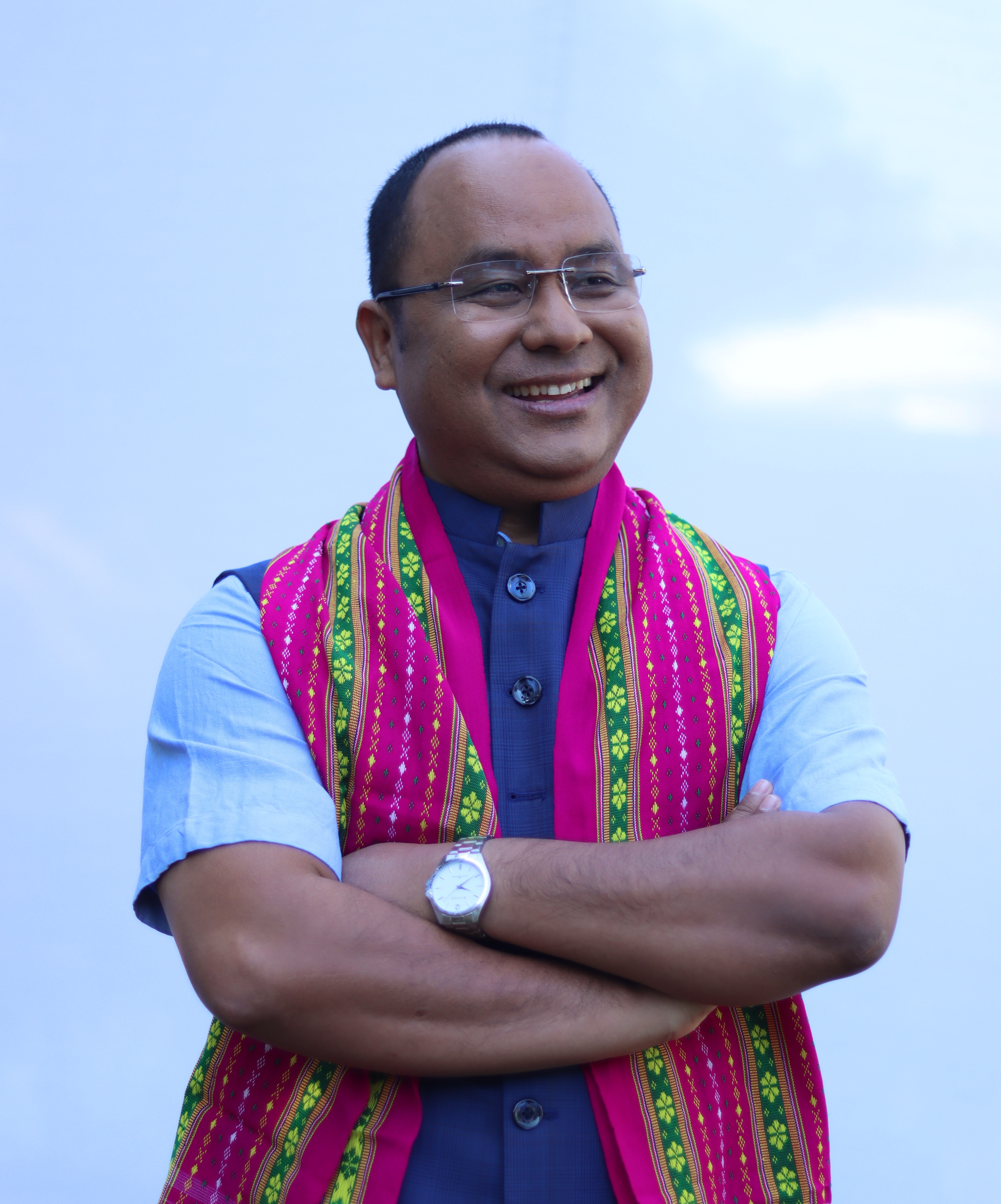
- Official portrait, 2023

Cabinet Minister, Government of Tripura
- Incumbent
- Assumed office 7 March 2024
- Departments: Forests; General Administration (Printing & Stationery); Science, Technology, and Environment
- Preceded by: Mevar Kumar Jamatia and Jishnu Dev Varma

Leader of The Opposition in Tripura Legislative Assembly
- In office 24 March 2023 – 7 March 2024
- Preceded by: Manik Sarkar
- Succeeded by: Jitendra Chaudhury

Member of Tripura Legislative Assembly
- Incumbent
- Assumed office 17 March 2023
- Preceded by: Mevar Kumar Jamatia
- Constituency: Asharambari
- Preceded by: Aghore Debbarma
- Constituency: Kulai-Champahour

Deputy Chief Executive Member of Tripura Tribal Areas Autonomous District Council
- In office 20 April 2021 – 17 March 2023
- Preceded by: Madhumati Debbarma
- Succeeded by: Rajeshwar Debbarma

Personal details
- Born: 19 January 1970 (age 56) Rajnagar, Tripura, India
- Party: Tipra Motha Party
- Education: B.Tech (Computer Science and Engineering)
- Alma mater: North Eastern Regional Institute of Science and Technology
- Profession: Social and Political Activist

Animesh Debbarma (born 19 January 1970) is an Indian politician and a senior leader of the Tipra Motha Party. Currently, he is a cabinet minister in the second Manik Saha Ministry. He served as the 13th Leader of the Opposition of the Tripura Legislative Assembly from 24 March 2023 to 6 March 2024. He was also the Deputy Chief Executive Member of TTAADC but resigned when he won the 2023 Tripura Legislative Assembly election.

== Early life ==
Animesh Debbarma was born in Rajnagar village of the Khowai District of Tripura. Debbarma graduated with a B.Tech in Computer Science and an engineering degree from NERIST, Arunachal Pradesh. He worked as an engineer at Indian Oil, Mumbai for many years and CSIRO, Nagpur as a scientist for several years.

He left his corporate job at Indian Oil to join mainstream politics and became a member of the Indigenous Nationalist Party of Twipra (INPT) around early 2000. He is known as Animesh Babu and also as the founder of the National Conference of Tripura.

== Political career ==
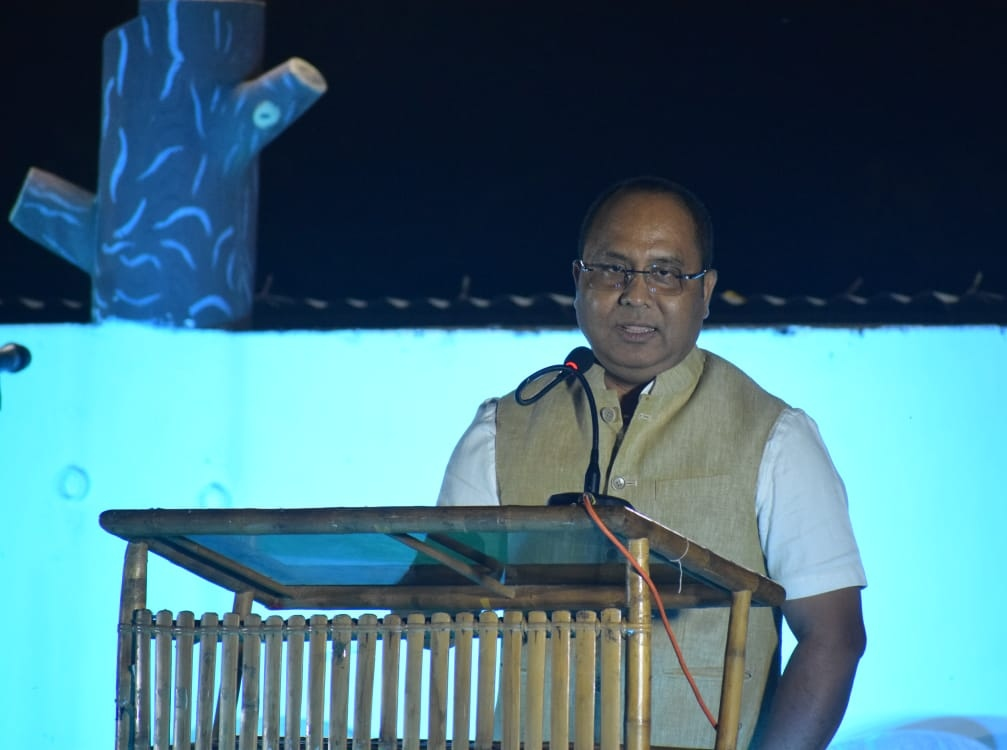
Animesh Debbarma speaking at the Khasi-Tiprasa Council meet in Khumulwng on April 27, 2023.

=== Cabinet Minister ===
Animesh Debbarma was sworn in as a cabinet minister in the Manik Saha ministry on March 7, 2024, following the Tiprasa Accord between the Union Government of India, Tipra Motha, and the Government of Tripura. On March 16, 2024, Debbarma was assigned the portfolios of Forests, General Administration (Printing & Stationery), and Science, Technology, and Environment.

=== Tripura State Legislature ===
Debbarma was previously a member of the Indigenous Nationalist Party of Twipra. In 2003 Tripura Legislative Assembly election he contesting as the candidate of INPT and won the election against the CPI(M) candidate Aghore Debbarma. In 2006, Debbarma separated from the INPT and formed a new party, the National Conference of Tripura along with other disaffected party members.

=== Autonomous District Council ===
In 2020, he merged his party into the INPT. Debbarma joined the Tipra Motha Party before the TTAADC election on 20 February 2021, leaving the INPT. Animesh then contested the 2021 Tripura Tribal Areas Autonomous District Council Election and won in the Kulai-Champahour constituency.

Later, he was made the Deputy Chief Executive Member of TTAADC and was allocated important portfolios like Tribal Welfare, Industries and Agriculture. Animesh resigned from the post of Deputy Chief Executive Member in March after being elected to the Tripura Legislative Assembly.

=== Leader of Opposition, Tripura Legislative Assembly ===
He contested the 2023 Tripura Legislative Assembly from Ashrambari constituency and won with a margin 18,382 votes. This was one of the largest majorities in that election.

Debbarma was the Leader of Opposition of Tripura Legislative Assembly as TIPRA Motha became the official opposition with 13 legislators till 7 March 2024. On March 7, 2024, Debbarma resigned from the office of Leader of The Opposition to be sworn in as a cabinet minister.

== Electoral performance ==
Election	Constituency	Party	Result	Votes %	Opposition Candidate	Opposition Party	Opposition vote %	Ref
2023	Asharambari	TMP	Won	66.56%	Jayanti Debbarma	IPFT	15.38%	
2008	Pramodenagar	Independent	Lost	36.62%	Aghore Debbarma	CPI(M)	54.00%	
2003	Pramodenagar	INPT	Won	48.52%	Aghore Debbarma	CPI(M)	46.75%	

== Positions held ==
- Cabinet Minister, Tripura Government (7 March 2024 – present)
- Member, Business Advisory Committee (4 April 2025 – present)
- Deputy Chief Executive Member of Tripura Tribal Areas Autonomous District Council, 2021-2023
- Member, Tripura Legislative Assembly (2003-2008)
- Leader of Opposition, Tripura Legislative Assembly (24 March 2023 – 6 March 2024)

== Policy initiatives ==
As of 2025 under minister Animesh Debbarma, three externally funded projects are being implemented in Tripura. The three projects, led by the Japan International Cooperation Agency (JICA), the Federal Government of Germany through KFW and World Bank-funded ELEMENT project are working across Tripura focusing on forest management, community development and enhancing livelihoods.

Debbarma has announced the launching of JICA 3.0 after the completion of JICA 2.0 in 2025. Through the SCATFORM (Sustainable Catchment Forest Project Management), Debbarma has initiated the development of eco-tourism across Tripura.

To enhance forest patrolling and protection, minister Animesh Debbarma initiated the procurement of motorbikes and distributed motorbikes to forest rangers.

Debbarma is currently overseeing the establishment of roadside markets and forest producers outlets across all eleven blocks of the Dhalai District of Tripura to provide opportunities to vendors and farmers to sell forest products. Furthermore, six eco-tourism parks are to be created to boost state tourism in as many districts of Tripura.

Minister Animesh Debbarma pressed the assembly to deploy 400 personnel from Tripura’s paramilitary force, the Tripura State Rifles (TSR), under District Forest Officers (DFOs), and sought approval for the Forest Protection Unit (FPU) to procure AK-47 rifles to combat illegal timber smuggling.

== Views and opinions ==
Animesh Debbarma has been an active proponent of a separate state of Greater Tipraland, opining that the Tiprasas need more autonomy, financial and political empowerment.

=== Kokborok Script ===
Animesh Debbarma has raised the issue of the ongoing Kokborok Script Debate in the assembly session on March 28, 2023. He have addressed that the government must prioritize the demands of the people before making any decision relating to the Kokborok language. Specifically concerning the issue of Kokborok as a CBSE subject, Debbarma demanded the question paper should be written in both the Roman and Bengali scripts to make it more efficient for students.

=== Forest protection and conservation ===
As the minister in charge of the Forest Department in the Government of Tripura, Debbarma, in response to rapid deforestation, has urged the central government to reconsider and take careful steps while clearing pristine forests in Tripura for infrastructure projects for highway and other heavy construction. He urged the Union Ministry of Environment, Forest and Climate Change to establish an eco-friendly model of development.

Forest Minister Animesh Debbarma also urged the Ministry of Railways and the National Highways and Infrastructure Development Corporation Limited (NHIDCL) to build underpasses along routes that cut through elephant corridors in order to curb the increase in cases of man-elephant conflict.
