= Mevar Kumar Jamatia =

Indian politician (born 1968)

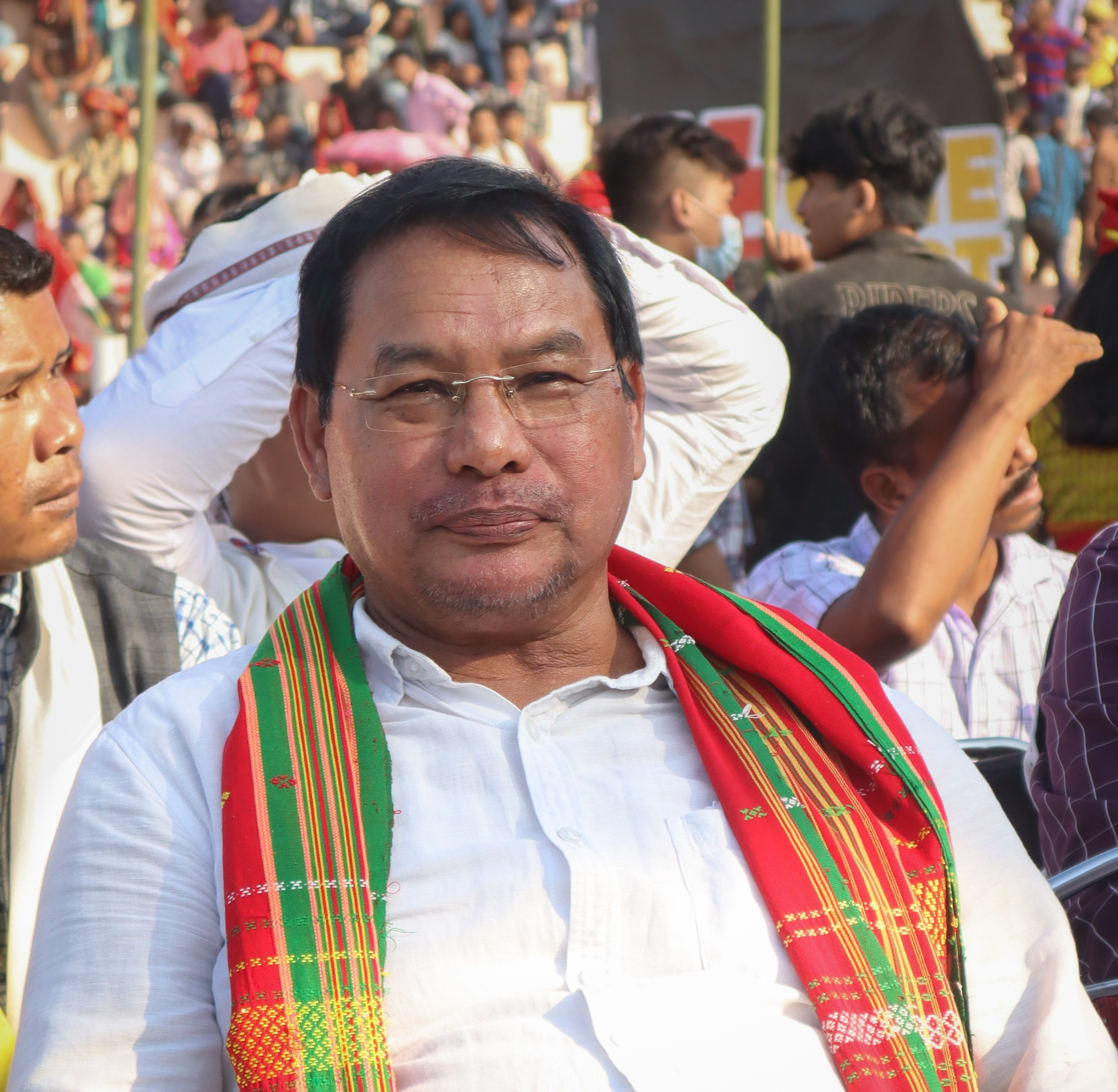
- Mevar Kumar Jamatia in 2022

Minister of Tribal Welfare, Industries & Commerce (HHS) and Fisheries
- In office 9 March 2018 – 16 May 2022
- Minister: Shri Biplab Kumar Deb

Member of the Tripura Legislative Assembly
- In office 2018–2022
- Preceded by: Aghore Debbarma
- Succeeded by: Animesh Debbarma
- Constituency: Asharambari

Personal details
- Born: Mevar Kumar Jamatia; 5 June 1968 (age 58) Tripura, India
- Party: Tipra Motha Party
- Spouse: Gita Debbarma
- Children: 1
- Education: North-Eastern Hill University

Mevar Kumar Jamatia (born 5 June 1968), is a Tiprasa Indian Politician from Tripura. He was a former Minister of Tribal Welfare, Industries and Commerce, and Forest in the Biplab Kumar Deb ministry. He became the MLA from the Asharambari Constituency by defeating the CPI(M) candidate Aghore Debbarma by a margin of 6,987 votes.

== Early life and education ==
Jamatia attended NEHU, Meghlaya for his B.A. studies. He completed his Masters in sociology from NEHU in 1995. He was an active leader of the Twipra Students' Federation (TSF) before becoming its General Secretary.

== Political career ==
In 2018, Mevar Kumar Jamatia took office as the cabinet minister for Tribal Welfare, Industries & Commerce, and Forestries in the Biplab Deb Ministry.

On 12 May 2022 he was removed from the post and excluded from the IPFT. Three months before the 2023 Tripura Legislative Assembly election, he resigned from the Tripura Legislative Assembly on 8 November 2022. He joined the Tipra Motha Party on 10 November 2023.

== Electoral performance ==
| Election | Constituency | Party | Result | Votes % | Opposition Candidate | Opposition Party | Opposition vote % | Ref |
|---|---|---|---|---|---|---|---|---|
| 2018 | Asharambari | IPFT | Won | 57.34% | Aghore Debbarma | CPI(M) | 36.46% | |
