= Pinaki Das Chowdhury =

Indian politician

Pinaki Das Chowdhury is an Indian politician and a member of the Tripura Legislative Assembly.
