= Ram Prasad Paul =

Indian politician

14th Deputy Speaker of Tripura Legislative Assembly
- Incumbent
- Assumed office 28 March 2023
- Speaker: Biswa Bandhu Sen; Ram Pada Jamatia
- Chief Minister: Manik Saha
- Preceded by: Biswa Bandhu Sen
- Constituency: Suryamaninagar

Cabinet Minister, Government of Tripura
- In office 2018–2023
- Ministry and Departments: Fire and Emergency Service; Jail; Welfare of Other Backward Classes; Welfare of Minorities
- Speaker: Biswa Bandhu Sen

Member of the Tripura Legislative Assembly
- Incumbent
- Assumed office 2018
- Preceded by: Raj Kumar Chaudhuri
- Constituency: Suryamaninagar

Personal details
- Born: 1968 (age 57–58)
- Party: Bharatiya Janata Party (BJP)
- Education: Undergraduate

Ram Prasad Paul (born 1968) is an Indian Politician from Tripura. He is currently serving as the 14th Deputy Speaker of the Tripura Legislative Assembly since 2023. He was Minister of Fire and Emergency Service in the Government of Tripura under the Biplab Kumar Deb ministry. He became the MLA from the Suryamaninagar Constituency by defeating CPI(M) candidate Rajkumar Choudhury by a margin of 4,567 votes in 2018.

== Controversies ==
In May 2022, Paul stirred nationwide controversy by wailing and hurling a chair while screaming out loud “I will die, I will not (have anything to) do (with) such a party”, over a new announcement by the Chief Minister.
