= Tripura Territorial Council =

Legislative body of Tripura Union Territory (1957–1963)

The Tripura Territorial Council was the legislature of the Union Territory of Tripura from 1957 to 1963.

== History ==
Tripura became a Union Territory of India on September 1, 1956. A 30-member Electoral College was established. In 1957 this was replaced by a 32-member Territorial Council consisting of 30 elected members and two appointed by the national government. Elections were held in 1957 and 1962.

In 1963 the Territorial Council was dissolved and the members transferred to a newly created Legislative Assembly. The first elections to the Legislative Assembly occurred in 1967.
