= Bidya Debbarma =

Indian politician

Bidya Chandra Debbarma

Minister in Charge of Tribal Welfare, Tripura
- In office 1977–1993

Member of the Tripura Legislative Assembly
- In office 1967–1993

Personal details
- Born: 11 April 1916 Khowai, Tripura
- Died: June 18, 2010 (aged 94) Agartala, Tripura
- Party: Communist Party of India (Marxist)

Bidya Chandra Debbarma (11 April 1916 – 18 June 2010) was an Indian politician and a prominent leader of the communist movement in Tripura. Debbarma spent a total of nine years in prison and 13 years operating as an underground activist. He was a six-time member of the Tripura Legislative Assembly and served as a minister in the state government, remaining undefeated in every election he contested.

== Biography ==
Debbarma grew up in a tribal farming family in rural Tripura. He was unable to continue his formal schooling beyond class VII. He later joined the Royal Army of Tripura, the armed forces of the monarchy that ruled the state at the time. During the Second World War, Debbarma protested against the Tripura army assisting British forces, which resulted in his transfer to administrative non-combatant duties as a disciplinary measure.

When reform-oriented forces organized the Janashiksha Samity in 1945, Debbarma secretly associated with the movement. He was captured and interned at Khowai jail, where he was subjected to torture. A death sentence was issued against him by the Tripura government, but it was never executed.

Debbarma later became an organiser for the Janashiksha Samity and mobilised protest activities against the government of Tripura. He also participated in the founding of the Ganamukti Parishad (People's Liberation Council) movement.

== Political career ==
Debbarma initially joined the Communist Party of India (CPI) and was arrested during the 1962 Sino-Indian War. When the party split in 1964, he aligned with the Communist Party of India (Marxist) (CPI(M)) and was elected to its Tripura State Committee. He remained a member of the state committee until his death. Additionally, he served as the vice president of the Ganamukti Parishad, the tribal mass organisation of the CPI(M) in Tripura.

Debbarma faced subsequent arrests in 1965 (during the Indo-Pakistani War of 1965), 1968, 1973 (during the food movement), and 1975 (during the Emergency, when he was imprisoned for 21 months).

He served as a member of the Tripura Legislative Assembly between 1967 and 1993, winning six consecutive elections. When the CPI(M)-Congress for Democracy coalition government was formed in 1977, Debbarma was appointed Minister in Charge of Tribal Welfare. In his later years, he retired from active politics due to declining health.
