= Manoj Kanti Deb =

Indian politician

Minister of Food, civil supplies and consumer affairs, Urban Development
- In office 9 March 2018 – March 2023

Personal details
- Born: Manoj Kanti Deb Tripura, India
- Party: Bharatiya Janata Party
- Cabinet: State Government of Tripura

Manoj Kanti Deb is an Indian politician from Tripura. He was the Minister of Food, Civil Supplies and Consumer Affairs, and Urban Development, in the Manik Saha ministry.

He joined the Bharatiya Janata Party in 2017 after leaving the Indian National Congress. He became the MLA from the Kamalpur Constituency by defeating CPI(M) candidate Bijoy Laxmi Singha by a margin of 2,959 votes.
