= Biswa Bandhu Sen =

Indian politician (1953–2025)

11th Speaker of the Tripura Legislative Assembly
- In office 24 March 2023 – 26 December 2025
- CM: Manik Saha
- Deputy Speaker: Ram Prasad Paul
- Preceded by: Ratan Chakraborty
- Succeeded by: Ram Pada Jamatia
- Constituency: Dharmanagar

Deputy Speaker of the Tripura Legislative Assembly
- In office 21 Jun 2018 – 2 March 2023
- Preceded by: Pabitra Kar
- Succeeded by: Ram Prasad Paul
- Constituency: Dharmanagar

Member of the Tripura Legislative Assembly
- In office 2008 – 26 December 2025
- Constituency: Dharmanagar

Personal details
- Born: 23 May 1953 Dharmanagar, Tripura, India
- Died: 26 December 2025 (aged 72) Bengaluru, Karnataka, India
- Party: Bharatiya Janata Party (from 2017)
- Other political affiliations: Indian National Congress (until 2017)

Biswa Bandhu Sen (23 May 1953 – 26 December 2025) was an Indian politician from Tripura. He served as the 11th speaker of the Tripura Legislative Assembly. He was a four time MLA from the 56-Dharmanagar Assembly constituency of North Tripura district.

== Early life and education ==
Sen was from Dharmanagar, North Tripura District, Tripura. He was the son of late Kali Mohan Sen. Sen completed his B.A. in 1975 at Maharaja Bir Bikram College, which is affiliated with Calcutta University. His wife was a retired government teacher.

== Career ==
Sen became an MLA for the first time winning the 2008 Tripura Legislative Assembly election representing the Indian National Congress defeating Amitabha Datta of the Communist Party of India (Marxist) by a margin of 2,410 votes. He retained the seat again on the Congress ticket in the 2013 Tripura Legislative Assembly election, beating Datta again by a margin of 1,844 votes. In 2017, he switched to the Bharatiya Janata Party and won the Dharmanagar seat in the 2018 Tripura Legislative Assembly election, defeating Abhijit De, also of the CPI (M) by a margin of 7,287 votes. He won a fourth consecutive term in the 2023 Assembly elections, beating Chayan Bhattacharya of the Indian National Congress by a margin of 1,098 votes.

== Death ==
Sen died from complications of a brain haemorrhage on 26 December 2025, at the age of 72.

== Electoral performance ==
Election	Constituency	Party	Result	Votes %	Opposition Candidate	Opposition Party	Opposition vote %	Ref
2023	Dharmanagar	BJP	Won	49.35%	Chayan Bhattacharya	INC	46.45%	
2018	Dharmanagar	BJP	Won	57.21%	Abhijit De	CPI(M)	37.69%	
2013	Dharmanagar	INC	Won	50.99%	Amitabha Datta	CPI(M)	45.77%	
2008	Dharmanagar	INC	Won	51.65%	Amitabha Datta	CPI(M)	43.86%	
