= Bhagaban Das =

Indian politician

Member of the Tripura Legislative Assembly
- Incumbent
- Assumed office 2018
- Preceded by: Samiran Malakar
- Constituency: Pabiachhara

Minister of Welfare of Scheduled Castes of Tripura
- Incumbent
- Assumed office 2021

Personal details
- Born: 18 November 1974 (age 51) Ujan Dudhpur, Kumarghat, Unakoti district, Tripura
- Party: Bharatiya Janata Party
- Education: 8th Pass

Bhagaban Das (born 18 November 1974) is an Indian politician who is serving as a member of the Tripura Legislative Assembly from Pabiachara since 2018 representing the Bharatiya Janata Party. He became Minister of Welfare of Scheduled Castes of Tripura in 2021.

== Personal life ==
He was born in Ujan Dudhpur to Rakesh Chandra Das and Sushama Das. He is married to Soma Das, they have 2 sons and 1 daughter.

== Career ==
He joined Rashtriya Swayamsevak Sangh and worked for the Bharatiya Janata Party in the 1993 Assembly Election. Later, he worked as ‘Maha Mantri’ of the Unakoti district. In 2008 and 2013, he contested the Assembly Election as a BJP candidate. In 2018, he was elected as a member of the Tripura Legislative Assembly, and he is the currently the Minister of Welfare of Scheduled Castes of Tripura.

== Controversy ==
- Following the MLA's selection for a position as a cabinet minister, the TMC claimed that BJP MLA Bhagaban Das's SC certificate was a forgery and requested an investigation.
- Tripura's opposition called for Das' removal over allegations that a group of youths, led by the minister's son, gang-raped a minor girl. Following these allegations, Das publicly compared the accusers of his son's rape to barking dogs, "Haathi chale bazaar kutte bhoke hazaar".
