= Tripura Legislative Assembly =

Unicameral legislature of the Indian state of Tripura

- 13th Tripura Assembly

Type
- Type: Unicameral
- Term limits: 5 years

History
- Founded: 20 March 1972 (54 years ago)

Leadership
- Governor of Tripura: Indrasena Reddy
- Speaker: Ram Pada Jamatia, BJP since 18 March 2026
- Deputy Speaker: Ram Prasad Paul, BJP since 28 March 2023
- Leader of the House (Chief Minister): Manik Saha, BJP since 15 May 2022
- Leader of the Opposition: Jitendra Chaudhury, CPI(M) since 6 March 2024

Structure
- Seats: 60
- Political groups: Government (47) NEDA(47): BJP (33); TMP (13); IPFT (1); Opposition (13) SDF (13): CPI(M) (10); INC (3)

Elections
- Voting system: First past the post
- Last election: 16 February 2023
- Next election: 2028

Meeting place
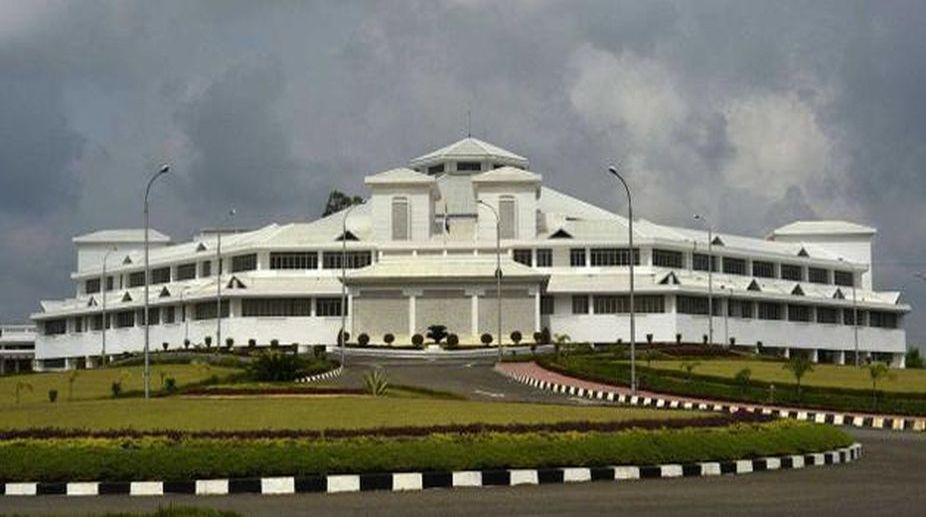
- Tripura Vidhan Sabha, Agartala

Website
- Tripura Legislative Assembly

The Tripura Legislative Assembly is the unicameral legislature of the Indian state of Tripura, with 60 Members of the Legislative Assembly. The present Assembly is located in Gurkhabasti. Ujjayanta Palace in Agartala served as the previous meeting place. The tenure of the Assembly is five years unless sooner dissolved. The present Assembly is the 13th Legislative Assembly, where the current speaker of the House is Ram Pada Jamatia since 18 March 2026. On 15 August 1957, a Territorial Council was formed with 30 elected members and two members nominated by the Government of India.

An aerial view of the Capital Complex in Agartala, featuring the Tripura Civil Secretariat on the left and the Tripura Legislative Assembly on the right

== List of Assemblies ==
The assemblies constituted so far are listed below:

Assembly	Ruling Party	Chief Minister	Period	Opposition Party
1st Assembly	Indian National Congress	Sachindra Lal Singh	1 July 1963 to 12 January 1967	Communist Party of India
2nd Assembly	Indian National Congress	Sachindra Lal Singh	1 March 1967 to 1 November 1971	Communist Party of India (Marxist)
3rd Assembly	Indian National Congress (R)	Sukhamoy Sen Gupta	20 March 1972 to 5 November 1977	Communist Party of India (Marxist)
4th Assembly	Communist Party of India (Marxist)	Nripen Chakraborty	5 January 1978 to 7 January 1983	Tripura Upajati Juba Samiti
5th Assembly	Communist Party of India (Marxist)	Nripen Chakraborty	10 January 1983 to 5 February 1988	Indian National Congress
6th Assembly	Indian National Congress	Sudhir Ranjan Majumdar	5 February 1988 to 28 February 1993	Communist Party of India (Marxist)
7th Assembly	Communist Party of India (Marxist)	Dasarath Deb	10 April 1993 to 10 March 1998	Indian National Congress
8th Assembly	Communist Party of India (Marxist)	Manik Sarkar	10 March 1998 to 28 February 2003	Indian National Congress
9th Assembly	Communist Party of India (Marxist)	Manik Sarkar	4 March 2003 to 3 March 2008	Indian National Congress
10th Assembly	Communist Party of India (Marxist)	Manik Sarkar	10 March 2008 to 1 March 2013	Indian National Congress
11th Assembly	Communist Party of India (Marxist)	Manik Sarkar	2 March 2013 to 3 March 2018	Indian National Congress
12th Assembly	Bharatiya Janata Party	Biplab Kumar Deb	4 March 2018 to 14 May 2022	Communist Party of India (Marxist)
12th Assembly	Bharatiya Janata Party	Manik Saha	15 May 2022 to 12 March 2023	Communist Party of India (Marxist)
13th Assembly	Bharatiya Janata Party	Manik Saha	13 March 2023-	Communist Party of India (Marxist)

== Members of Legislative Assembly ==
District	No.	Constituency	Name	Party	Alliance	Remarks
West Tripura	1	Simna (ST)	Brishaketu Debbarma	TMP	NDA	Minister of State
West Tripura	2	Mohanpur	Ratan Lal Nath	BJP	NDA	Cabinet Minister
West Tripura	3	Bamutia (SC)	Nayan Sarkar	CPI(M)	SDF	
West Tripura	4	Barjala (SC)	Sudip Sarkar	CPI(M)	SDF	
West Tripura	5	Khayerpur	Ratan Chakraborty	BJP	NDA	
West Tripura	6	Agartala	Sudip Roy Barman	INC	SDF	
West Tripura	7	Ramnagar	Surajit Datta	BJP	NDA	Died on 27 December 2023
West Tripura	7	Ramnagar	Dipak Majumder	BJP	NDA	
West Tripura	8	Town Bordowali	Manik Saha	BJP	NDA	Chief Minister
West Tripura	9	Banamalipur	Gopal Chandra Roy	INC	SDF	
West Tripura	10	Majlishpur	Sushanta Chowdhury	BJP	NDA	Cabinet Minister
West Tripura	11	Mandaibazar (ST)	Swapna Debbarma	TMP	NDA	
Sipahijala	12	Takarjala (ST)	Biswajit Kalai	TMP	NDA	
West Tripura	13	Pratapgarh (SC)	Ramu Das	CPI(M)	SDF	
West Tripura	14	Badharghat (SC)	Mina Rani Sarkar	BJP	NDA	
Sipahijala	15	Kamalasagar	Antara Sarkar Deb	BJP	NDA	
Sipahijala	16	Bishalgarh	Sushanta Deb	BJP	NDA	
Sipahijala	17	Golaghati (ST)	Manab Debbarma	TMP	NDA	
West Tripura	18	Suryamaninagar	Ram Prasad Paul	BJP	NDA	
Sipahijala	19	Charilam (ST)	Subodh Deb Barma	TMP	NDA	
Sipahijala	20	Boxanagar	Samsul Haque	CPI(M)	SDF	Died on 19 July 2023
Sipahijala	20	Boxanagar	Tafajjal Hossain	BJP	NDA	Elected in September 2023 by-election
Sipahijala	21	Nalchar (SC)	Kishor Barman	BJP	NDA	Cabinet Minister
Sipahijala	22	Sonamura	Shyamal Chakraborty	CPI(M)	SDF	
Sipahijala	23	Dhanpur	Pratima Bhoumik	BJP	NDA	Resigned on 15 March 2023
Sipahijala	23	Dhanpur	Bindu Debnath	BJP	NDA	Elected in September 2023 by-election
Khowai	24	Ramchandraghat (ST)	Ranjit Debbarma	TMP	NDA	
Khowai	25	Khowai	Nirmal Biswas	CPI(M)	SDF	
Khowai	26	Asharambari (ST)	Animesh Debbarma	TMP	NDA	Cabinet Minister
Khowai	27	Kalyanpur-Pramodenagar	Pinaki Das Chowdhury	BJP	NDA	
Khowai	28	Teliamura	Kalyani Saha Roy	BJP	NDA	
Khowai	29	Krishnapur (ST)	Bikash Debbarma	BJP	NDA	Cabinet Minister
Gomati	30	Bagma (ST)	Ram Pada Jamatia	BJP	NDA	Speaker
Gomati	31	Radhakishorpur	Pranjit Singha Roy	BJP	NDA	Cabinet Minister
Gomati	32	Matarbari	Abhishek Debroy	BJP	NDA	
Gomati	33	Kakraban-Salgarh (SC)	Jitendra Majumder	BJP	NDA	
South Tripura	34	Rajnagar (SC)	Swapna Majumder	BJP	NDA	
South Tripura	35	Belonia	Dipankar Sen	CPI(M)	SDF	
South Tripura	36	Santirbazar (ST)	Pramod Reang	BJP	NDA	
South Tripura	37	Hrishyamukh	Asoke Chandra Mitra	CPI(M)	SDF	
South Tripura	38	Jolaibari (ST)	Sukla Charan Noatia	IPFT	NDA	Cabinet Minister
South Tripura	39	Manu (ST)	Mailafru Mog	BJP	NDA	
South Tripura	40	Sabroom	Jitendra Chaudhury	CPI(M)	SDF	Leader of Opposition
Gomati	41	Ampinagar (ST)	Pathan Lal Jamatia	TMP	NDA	
Gomati	42	Amarpur	Ranjit Das	BJP	NDA	
Gomati	43	Karbook (ST)	Sanjoy Manik Tripura	TMP	NDA	
Dhalai	44	Raima Valley (ST)	Nandita Debbarma (Reang)	TMP	NDA	
Dhalai	45	Kamalpur	Manoj Kanti Deb	BJP	NDA	
Dhalai	46	Surma (SC)	Swapna Das Paul	BJP	NDA	
Dhalai	47	Ambassa (ST)	Chitta Ranjan Debbarma	TMP	NDA	
Dhalai	48	Karamcherra (ST)	Paul Dangshu	TMP	NDA	
Dhalai	49	Chawamanu (ST)	Sambhu Lal Chakma	BJP	NDA	
Unakoti	50	Pabiachhara (SC)	Bhagaban Das	BJP	NDA	
Unakoti	51	Fatikroy (SC)	Sudhangshu Das	BJP	NDA	Cabinet Minister
Unakoti	52	Chandipur	Tinku Roy	BJP	NDA	Cabinet Minister
Unakoti	53	Kailashahar	Birajit Sinha	INC	SDF	Congress Legislative Party Leader
North Tripura	54	Kadamtala-Kurti	Islam Uddin	CPI(M)	SDF	
North Tripura	55	Bagbassa	Jadab Lal Debnath	BJP	NDA	
North Tripura	56	Dharmanagar	Biswa Bandhu Sen	BJP	NDA	Speaker, died on 26 December 2025.
North Tripura	56	Dharmanagar	Jahar Chakraborti	BJP	NDA	
North Tripura	57	Jubarajnagar	Sailendra Chandra Nath	CPI(M)	SDF	
North Tripura	58	Panisagar	Binay Bhushan Das	BJP	NDA	
North Tripura	59	Pencharthal (ST)	Santana Chakma	BJP	NDA	Cabinet Minister
North Tripura	60	Kanchanpur (ST)	Philip Kumar Reang	TMP	NDA	
