= Elections in Tripura =

Political elections for public offices in Tripura

Elections in Tripura have been conducted since 1952.

For the first Indian general election of 1951-52, voters in Tripura directly elected two members of the Lok Sabha and elected 30 members of an Electoral College which subsequently convened to elect a single member for the Rajya Sabha.

For elections in 1957 and 1962, voters in Tripura elected 30 members to a Territorial Council (with an extra two members appointed). In 1963 the Territorial Council was dissolved and the members transferred to a newly created Legislative Assembly. The first elections to the Legislative Assembly occurred in 1967. In March 1972, the Legislative Assembly was enlarged to 60 members as a result of Tripura attaining statehood.

== Lok Sabha elections ==
The Lok Sabha election results for Tripura are as follows:

Year	Lok Sabha	Tripura West	Tripura East
1952	1st	Communist Party of India	Communist Party of India
1957	2nd	Indian National Congress	Communist Party of India
1962	3rd	Communist Party of India	Communist Party of India
1967	4th	Indian National Congress	Indian National Congress
1971	5th	Communist Party of India (Marxist)	Communist Party of India (Marxist)
1977	6th	Janata Party	Indian National Congress
1980	7th	Communist Party of India (Marxist)	Communist Party of India (Marxist)
1984	8th	Communist Party of India (Marxist)	Communist Party of India (Marxist)
1989	9th	Indian National Congress	Indian National Congress
1991	10th	Indian National Congress	Indian National Congress
1996	11th	Communist Party of India (Marxist)	Communist Party of India (Marxist)
1998	12th	Communist Party of India (Marxist)	Communist Party of India (Marxist)
1999	13th	Communist Party of India (Marxist)	Communist Party of India (Marxist)
2004	14th	Communist Party of India (Marxist)	Communist Party of India (Marxist)
2009	15th	Communist Party of India (Marxist)	Communist Party of India (Marxist)
2014	16th	Communist Party of India (Marxist)	Communist Party of India (Marxist)
2019	17th	Bharatiya Janata Party	Bharatiya Janata Party
2024	18th	Bharatiya Janata Party	Bharatiya Janata Party

== Legislative Assembly Elections ==
Legislative assembly election		Winner			Runner-up			Chief Minister	Leader of Opposition
Year	#	Party	Seats	Vote %	Party	Seats	Vote %	Chief Minister	Leader of Opposition
1967	2nd	INC	27	57.95%	CPI(M)	2	21.61%	Sachindra Lal Singh	Bidya Debbarma
1972	3rd	INC	41	44.83%	CPI(M)	16	37.82%	Sachindra Lal Singh; Prafulla Kumar Das; Radhika Ranjan Gupta	Nripen Chakraborty; Munsur Ali
1977	4th	CPI(M)	51	47.00%	TUS	4	7.93%	Nripen Chakraborty	Drao Kumar Reang
1983	5th	CPI(M)	37	46.78%	INC	12	30.51%	Nripen Chakraborty	Ashok Kumar Bhattacharya; Sudhir Ranjan Majumdar
1988	6th	INC	32	47.85%	CPI(M)	26	45.82%	Sudhir Ranjan Majumdar; Samir Ranjan Barman	Nripendra Chakraborty; Dasarath Deb
1993	7th	CPI(M)	44	44.78%	INC	10	32.73%	Dasarath Deb	Samir Ranjan Barman
1998	8th	CPI(M)	38	45.49%	INC	13	33.96%	Manik Sarkar	Samir Ranjan Barman; Jawahar Saha
2003	9th	CPI(M)	38	46.82%	INC	13	32.84%	Manik Sarkar	Ratan Lal Nath
2008	10th	CPI(M)	46	48.01%	INC	10	36.38%	Manik Sarkar	Ratan Lal Nath
2013	11th	CPI(M)	49	48.11%	INC	6	36.53%	Manik Sarkar	Ratan Lal Nath
2018	12th	BJP	36	43.59%	CPI(M)	16	42.22%	Biplab Kumar Deb	Manik Sarkar
2023	13th	BJP	32	38.97%	TMP	13	19.69%	Manik Saha	Animesh Debbarma; Jitendra Chaudhury
