= Department of Law and Parliamentary Affairs (Tripura) =

Government department in Tripura, India

Department overview
- Formed: 1 February 1971; 55 years ago
- Jurisdiction: Government of Tripura
- Headquarters: Secretariat Building, Agartala
- Ministers responsible: Manik Saha, Law Department; Ratan Lal Nath, Parliamentary Affairs Department
- Department executive: Smt. Sankari Das, T.H.J.S., Secretary (Law) & Legal Remembrancer to the Government.
- Website: https://law.tripura.gov.in/

The Department of Law and Parliamentary Affairs is an administrative department under the Government of Tripura. The department is responsible for the administration of legal affairs, justice, and legislative matters. It serves as a link between the government and the public in legal matters and contributes to welfare-oriented governance. The Law Department also functions as the administrative department for the state judiciary, the state legislature, and the State Legal Services Authority. The Parliamentary Affairs Department responsible for coordinating the schedule of Asesembly sessions.

== History ==
The Department of Law was known as Judicial Department during the princely state, the department was renamed after merger with India in 1949. The parliamentary department was formed on 1 February 1971 combined with Department of Law.

== Ministers ==
Ministers of Law
| Name | Portrait | Term of office | |
|---|---|---|---|
| Sachindra Lal Singh | | 1 July 1963 | 13 March 1967 |
| Sachindra Lal Singh | | 13 March 1967 | 1 November 1971 |
| Sukhamoy Sengupta | | 20 March 1972 | 30 March 1977 |
| Prafulla Kumar Das | | 1 April 1977 | 25 July 1977 |
| Radhika Ranjan Gupta | | 26 July 1977 | 4 November 1977 |
| Nripen Chakraborty | | 5 January 1978 | 11 January 1983 |
| Nripen Chakraborty | | 11 January 1983 | 5 February 1988 |
| Sudhir Ranjan Majumdar | | 5 February 1988 | 19 February 1992 |
| Samir Ranjan Barman | | 19 February 1992 | 10 March 1993 |
| Dasarath Deb | | 10 April 1993 | 11 March 1998 |
| Manik Sarkar | | 11 March 1998 | 7 March 2003 |
| Manik Sarkar | | 7 March 2003 | 10 March 2008 |
| Manik Sarkar | | 10 March 2008 | 6 March 2013 |
| Manik Sarkar | | 6 March 2013 | 8 March 2018 |
| Ratan Lal Nath | | 9 March 2018 | 2 March 2023 |
| Manik Saha | | 10 March 2023 | Incumbent |

Ministers of Parliamentary Affairs
| Name | Portrait | Term of office | |
|---|---|---|---|
| Prafulla Kumar Das | | 1 February 1971 | 1 November 1971 |
| Sukhamoy Sengupta | | 20 March 1972 | 24 April 1975 |
| Debendra Kishore Chaudhury | | 25 April 1975 | 30 March 1977 |
| Prafulla Kumar Das | | 4 April 1977 | 25 April 1977 |
| Radhika Ranjan Gupta | | 26 April 1977 | 5 August 1977 |
| Kalipada Banerjee | | 6 August 1977 | 4 November 1977 |
| Anil Sarkar | | 6 January 1978 | 10 January 1983 |
| Anil Sarkar | | 11 January 1983 | 5 February 1988 |
| Sudhir Ranjan Majumdar | | 7 February 1988 | 3 April 1989 |
| Arun Kumar Kar | | 4 September 1989 | 19 February 1992 |
| Samir Ranjan Barman | | 25 February 1992 | 17 May 1992 |
| Ratan Chakraborty (Minister of State); Independent Charge | | 18 May 1992 | 10 March 1993 |
| Dasarath Deb | | 10 April 1993 | 11 March 1998 |
| Keshab Majumder | | 10 March 1998 | 28 February 2003 |
| Keshab Majumder | | 7 March 2003 | 3 March 2008 |
| Tapan Chakraborty | | 10 March 2008 | 28 February 2013 |
| Tapan Chakraborty | | 6 March 2013 | 8 March 2018 |
| Ratan Lal Nath | | 9 March 2018 | 9 March 2023 |
| Ratan Lal Nath | | 10 March 2023 | Incumbent |
