= Tripura West Lok Sabha constituency =

Lok Sabha Constituency in Tripura

Coordinates: 23.85°N 91.28°E

Tripura West TR-1
- Lok Sabha constituency
- Interactive Map Outlining Tripura East Lok Sabha constituency

Constituency details
- Country: India
- Region: Northeast India
- State: Tripura
- Assembly constituencies: 30: Simna, Mohanpur, Bamutia, Barjala, Khayerpur, Agartala, Ramnagar, Town Bordowali, Banamalipur, Majlishpur, Mandaibazar, Takarjala, Pratapgarh, Badharghat, Kamalasagar, Bishalgarh, Golaghati, Suryamaninagar, Charilam, Boxanagar, Nalchar, Sonamura, Dhanpur, Bagma, Radhakishorpur, Matarbari, Kakraban-Salgarh, Rajnagar, Belonia and Santirbazar
- Established: 1952
- Reservation: None

Member of Parliament
- 18th Lok Sabha
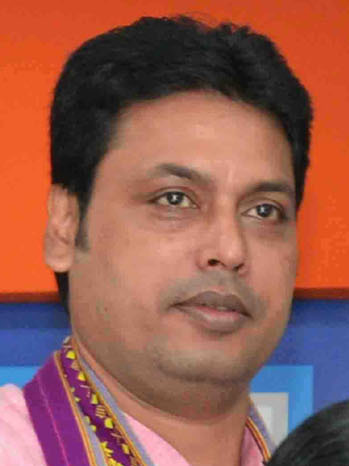
- Incumbent Biplab Kumar Deb
- Party: BJP
- Alliance: NDA
- Elected year: 2024

Tripura West Lok Sabha constituency (Bengali: ত্রিপুরা পশ্চিম লোকসভা কেন্দ্র) is one of two Lok Sabha constituencies in Tripura state in northeastern India. It includes the state capital Agartala.

== Assembly segments ==
Tripura West Lok Sabha constituency is composed of the following assembly segments:

#	Name	District	Member	Party
1	Simna	West Tripura	Brishaketu Debbarma	Tipra Motha Party
2	Mohanpur	West Tripura	Ratan Lal Nath	Bharatiya Janata Party
3	Bamutia	West Tripura	Nayan Sarkar	Communist Party of India (Marxist)
4	Barjala	West Tripura	Sudip Sarkar	Communist Party of India (Marxist)
5	Khayerpur	West Tripura	Ratan Chakraborty	Bharatiya Janata Party
6	Agartala	West Tripura	Sudip Roy Barman	Indian National Congress
7	Ramnagar	West Tripura	Dipak Majumdar	Bharatiya Janata Party
8	Town Bordowali	West Tripura	Manik Saha	Bharatiya Janata Party
9	Banamalipur	West Tripura	Gopal Chandra Roy	Indian National Congress
10	Majlishpur	West Tripura	Sushanta Chowdhury	Bharatiya Janata Party
11	Mandaibazar	West Tripura	Swapna Debbarma	Tipra Motha Party
12	Takarjala	Sipahijala	Biswajit Kalai	Tipra Motha Party
13	Pratapgarh	West Tripura	Ramu Das	Communist Party of India (Marxist)
14	Badarghat	West Tripura	Mina Rani Sarkar	Bharatiya Janata Party
15	Kamalasagar	Sipahijala	Antara Sarkar Deb	Bharatiya Janata Party
16	Bishalgarh	Sipahijala	Sushanta Deb	Bharatiya Janata Party
17	Golaghati	Sipahijala	Manab Debbarma	Tipra Motha Party
18	Suryamaninagar	West Tripura	Ram Prasad Paul	Bharatiya Janata Party
19	Charilam	Sipahijala	Subodh Debbarma	Tipra Motha Party
20	Boxanagar	Sipahijala	Tafajjal Hossain	Bharatiya Janata Party
21	Nalchar (SC)	Sipahijala	Kishor Barman	Bharatiya Janata Party
22	Sonamura	Sipahijala	Shyamal Chakraborty	Communist Party of India (Marxist)
23	Dhanpur	Sipahijala	Bindu Debnath	Bharatiya Janata Party
30	Bagma	Gomati	Ram Pada Jamatia	Bharatiya Janata Party
31	Radhakishorpur	Gomati	Pranjit Singha Roy	Bharatiya Janata Party
32	Matarbari	Gomati	Abhishek Debroy	Bharatiya Janata Party
33	Kakraban-Salgarh	Gomati	Jitendra Majumder	Bharatiya Janata Party
34	Rajnagar	South Tripura	Swapna Majumder	Bharatiya Janata Party
35	Belonia	South Tripura	Dipankar Sen	Communist Party of India (Marxist)
36	Santirbazar (ST)	South Tripura	Pramod Reang	Bharatiya Janata Party

== Members of Parliament ==
Year	Member	Party
1952	Birendra Chandra Dutta	Communist Party of India
1957	Bangshi Deb Barma	Indian National Congress
1962	Birendra Chandra Dutta	Communist Party of India
1967	J. K. Chaudhury	Indian National Congress
1971	Birendra Chandra Dutta	Communist Party of India (Marxist)
1977	Sachindra Lal Singh	Janata Party
1980	Ajoy Biswas	Communist Party of India (Marxist)
1984	Ajoy Biswas	Communist Party of India (Marxist)
1989	Santosh Mohan Dev	Indian National Congress
1991	Santosh Mohan Dev	Indian National Congress
1996	Badal Choudhury	Communist Party of India (Marxist)
1998	Samar Chowdhury	Communist Party of India (Marxist)
1999	Samar Chowdhury	Communist Party of India (Marxist)
2002^	Khagen Das	Communist Party of India (Marxist)
2004	Khagen Das	Communist Party of India (Marxist)
2009	Khagen Das	Communist Party of India (Marxist)
2014	Sankar Prasad Datta	Communist Party of India (Marxist)
2019	Pratima Bhoumik	Bharatiya Janata Party
2024	Biplab Kumar Deb	Bharatiya Janata Party

^By Poll

== Election results ==
Vote share of Winning candidates
2024	72.85%
2019	51.77%
2014	62.61%
2009	60.14%
2004	70.86%
2002 (By-Poll)	57.70%
1999	57.46%
1998	47.48%
1996	50.70%
1991	83.47%
1989	60.95%
1984	48.68%
1980	46.83%
1977	34.14%
1971	45.18%
1967	57.75%
1962	52.12%
1957	23.37%
1957	24.18%
1952	68.84%

=== 2024 ===
2024 Indian general election: Tripura West
Party	Candidate	Votes	%	±%
BJP	Biplab Kumar Deb	881,341	72.85	▲21.08
INC	Ashish Kumar Saha	269,763	22.30	▼1.88
NOTA	None of the Above	14,612	1.21	▲0.13
OTH	7 Other Candidates	44,093	3.66	
Majority		611,578	50.55	▲22.96
Turnout		1,209,809	82.66	▲0.78
BJP hold		Swing		

=== 2019 ===
2019 Indian general election: Tripura West
Party	Candidate	Votes	%	±%
BJP	Pratima Bhoumik	573,532	51.77	▲46.67
INC	Subal Bhowmik	267,843	24.18	▲8.50
CPI(M)	Sankar Prasad Datta	171,826	15.51	▼47.10
IPFT	Brishaketu Debbarma	44,225	3.99	▲2.96
NOTA	None of the Above	11,960	1.08	▼0.10
IND	4 Independent Candidates	13,258	1.20	
OTH	4 Other Party Candidates	16,498	1.49	
Majority		305,689	27.59	▼19.34
Turnout		1,107,755	81.88	▼4.29
Swing to BJP from CPI(M)		Swing		

=== 2014 ===
2014 Indian general election: Tripura West
Party	Candidate	Votes	%	±%
CPI(M)	Sankar Prasad Datta	671,665	62.61	▲2.47
INC	Arunoday Saha	168,179	15.68	▼17.95
AITC	Ratan Chakraborty	117,727	10.97	▲10.38
BJP	Sudhindra Chandra Dasgupta	54,706	5.10	▲2.38
NOTA	None of the Above	12,699	1.18	
OTH	9 Other Candidates	47,773	4.45	
Majority		503,486	46.93	▲20.42
Turnout		1,075,932	86.17	▲0.46
CPI(M) hold		Swing		

=== 2009 ===
2009 Indian general election: Tripura West
Party	Candidate	Votes	%	±%
CPI(M)	Khagen Das	563,799	60.14	▼10.72
INC	Sudip Roy Barman	315,250	33.63	▲17.63
BJP	Nilmani Deb	25,468	2.72	
OTH	7 Other Candidates	33,000	3.52	
Majority		248,549	26.51	▼28.35
Turnout		937,517	85.71	
CPI(M) hold		Swing		

=== 2004 ===
2004 Indian general election: Tripura West
Party	Candidate	Votes	%	±%
CPI(M)	Khagen Das	496,843	70.86	▲13.16
INC	Nirmala Dasgupta	112,207	16.00	▼19.63
AITC	Amal Mallik	67,379	9.61	▲4.73
OTH	3 Other Candidates	24,730	3.53	
Majority		384,636	54.86	▲32.79
Turnout		701,159		
CPI(M) hold		Swing		

=== 2002 by-election ===
A by-election was held in this constituency on 12 November 2002 which was necessitated by the Death of sitting MP Samar Chowdhury. In the by-election, Khagen Das of CPI(M) defeated his nearest rival Manik Deb of Congress by 1,50,843 votes.

By-election: Tripura West
Party	Candidate	Votes	%	±%
CPI(M)	Khagen Das	394,364	57.70	▲0.24
INC	Manik Deb	243,521	35.63	▲22.77
AITC	Sudhir Ranjan Majumdar	33,353	4.88	▼21.98
OTH	6 Other Party Candidates	12,186	1.79	
Majority		150,843	22.07	▼8.53
Turnout		701,159	67.50	▼2.55
CPI(M) hold		Swing		

=== 1999 ===
1999 Indian general election: Tripura West
Party	Candidate	Votes	%	±%
CPI(M)	Samar Chowdhury	372,553	57.46	▲9.98
AITC	Sudhir Ranjan Majumdar	174,154	26.86	
INC	Pijush Kanti Biswas	83,384	12.86	▼32.05
OTH	9 Other Candidates	18,252	2.81	
Majority		198,399	30.60	▲28.03
Turnout		659,408	70.05	▼12.35
CPI(M) hold		Swing		

=== 1998 ===
1998 Indian general election: Tripura West
Party	Candidate	Votes	%	±%
CPI(M)	Samar Chowdhury	347,970	47.48	▼3.22
INC	Radhika Ranjan Gupta	329,094	44.91	▲6.03
BJP	Hemendu Sankar Roy Choudhury	50,391	6.88	▲1.99
OTH	3 Other Candidates	5,353	0.73	
Majority		18,876	2.57	▼9.25
Turnout		745,574	82.40	▲1.99
CPI(M) hold		Swing		

=== 1996 ===
1996 Indian general election: Tripura West
Party	Candidate	Votes	%	±%
CPI(M)	Badal Choudhury	346,457	50.70	▲44.28
INC	Ashok Kumar Bhattacharyya	265,646	38.88	▼44.59
BJP	Hemendu Sankar Roy Choudhury	33,414	4.89	▲2.08
TUS	Shyama Charan Tripura	23,933	3.50	
OTH	7 Other Candidates	13,874	2.03	
Majority		80,811	11.82	▼65.23
Turnout		691,216	80.41	▲10.36
Swing to CPI(M) from INC		Swing		

=== 1991 ===
1991 Indian general election: Tripura West
Party	Candidate	Votes	%	±%
INC	Santosh Mohan Dev	464,743	83.47	▲22.52
CPI(M)	Manik Sarkar	35,759	6.42	▼29.89
BJP	Brojesh Chakraborty	15,662	2.81	▲1.72
AMB	Rakhal Raj Dutta	7,998	1.44	▲0.90
IND	6 Independent Candidates	32,610	5.85	
Majority		428,984	77.05	▲52.41
Turnout		573,131	70.05	▼15.70
INC hold		Swing		

=== 1989 ===
1989 Indian general election: Tripura West
Party	Candidate	Votes	%	±%
INC	Santosh Mohan Dev	410,904	60.95	▲13.01
CPI(M)	Manik Sarkar	244,749	36.31	▼12.37
BJP	Maharaj Bikram Deb Barma	7,376	1.09	▼0.39
AMB	Bhuban Bijoy Majumdar	3,608	0.54	
IND	3 Independent Candidates	7,482	1.10	
Majority		166,155	24.64	▲23.90
Turnout		688,261	85.75	▲7.52
Swing to INC from CPI(M)		Swing		

=== 1984 ===
1984 Indian general election: Tripura West
Party	Candidate	Votes	%	±%
CPI(M)	Ajoy Biswas	232,339	48.68	▲1.85
INC	Sudhir Ranjan Majumdar	228,819	47.94	▲14.18
BJP	Maharaj Kumar Nakshatra	7,070	1.48	
IND	3 Independent Candidates	9,031	1.89	
Majority		3,520	0.74	▼12.33
Turnout		486,667	78.23	▼2.32
CPI(M) hold		Swing		

=== 1980 ===
1980 Indian general election: Tripura West
Party	Candidate	Votes	%	±%
CPI(M)	Ajoy Biswas	198,335	46.83	▲20.85
INC(I)	Ashok Kr. Bhattacharya	142,990	33.76	▲1.26
TUS	Biswa Kumar Deb Barma	50,555	11.94	▲4.56
IND	Bhuban Bijoy Majumder	21,315	5.03	
JP	Dwijen Dey	5,657	1.34	▼32.80
INC(U)	Mohan Das Gupta Tarit	4,639	1.10	
Majority		55,345	13.07	▲11.43
Turnout		431,189	80.55	▲7.28
Swing to CPI(M) from JP		Swing		

=== 1977 ===
1977 Indian general election: Tripura West
Party	Candidate	Votes	%	±%
JP	Sachindra Lal Singh	104,858	34.14	
INC	Mohan Dasgupta Tarit	99,811	32.50	▼8.46
CPI(M)	Nripen Chakraborty	79,794	25.98	▼19.20
TUS	Harinath Debbarma	22,661	7.38	
Majority		5,047	1.64	▼2.58
Turnout		315,742	73.27	▲14.33
Swing to JP from CPI(M)		Swing		

=== 1971 ===
1971 Indian general election: Tripura West
Party	Candidate	Votes	%	±%
CPI(M)	Biren Dutta	88,264	45.18	▲2.93
INC	Anil Kumar Sen	80,026	40.96	▼16.79
CPI	Saroj Ranjan Chanda	16,193	8.29	
IND	Drao Kumar Rinag	8,833	4.52	
ABJS	Harendra Kishore Roy Barman	2,038	1.04	
Majority		8,238	4.22	▼11.28
Turnout		202,087	58.94	▼16.58
Swing to CPI(M) from INC		Swing		

=== 1967 ===
1967 Indian general election: Tripura West
Party	Candidate	Votes	%	±%
INC	J. K. Choudhury	125,965	57.75	▲15.92
CPI(M)	Biren Dutta	92,143	42.25	
Majority		33,822	15.50	▲5.21
Turnout		223,765	75.52	▲5.43
Swing to INC from CPI		Swing		

=== 1962 ===
1962 Indian general election: Tripura West
Party	Candidate	Votes	%	±%
CPI	Biren Dutta	86,084	52.12	
INC	Sukhamoy Sen Gupta	69,095	41.83	
PSP	Narayan Chandra Dey	6,302	3.82	
EIT (Note: Eastern Indian Tribal Union)	Sneha Kumar Chakma	3,687	2.23	
Majority		16,989	10.29	
Turnout		168,981	70.09	
CPI hold		Swing		

=== 1957 ===
In 1957, there was only one constituency named Tripura, and it was a double-member seat representing a single constituency.

1957 Indian general election: Tripura (2 seats)
Party	Candidate	Votes	%	±%
INC	Barma Deb Bangshi	133,078	24.18	
CPI	Dasarath Deb	128,624	23.37	
INC	Umesh Lal Singh	120,163	21.83	
CPI	Biren Dutta	119,798	21.77	
IND	3 Independent Candidates	48,675	8.84	
Majority		4,454	0.81	
Turnout		550,338	63.56	
CPI hold		Swing		
INC win (new seat)				

=== 1952 ===
1951–52 Indian general election: Tripura West
Party	Candidate	Votes	%	±%
CPI	Biren Dutta	53,592	68.84	
IND	M. K. Durjoykishore Dev Barman	10,987	14.11	
INC	Sukumar Chakraborty	10,613	13.63	
ABJS	Benoy Ganguly	2,659	3.42	
Majority		42,605	54.73	
Turnout		77,851	51.83	
CPI win (new seat)				

== See also ==
- List of constituencies of the Lok Sabha
- Tripura East (Lok Sabha constituency)
