= List of deputy chief ministers of Tripura =

Tripura Cabinet's deputy leader

Deputy Chief Minister of Tripura
- Emblem of Tripura
- Incumbent; Vacant since 2 March 2023
- Tripura Legislative Assembly
- Abbreviation: DCM
- Member of: Tripura Legislative Assembly; Cabinet of Tripura
- Nominator: Chief Minister of Tripura
- Appointer: Governor of Tripura
- Inaugural holder: Dasarath Deb

The deputy chief minister of Tripura is a member of the Cabinet of Tripura Government in the Government of Tripura. Not a constitutional office, it seldom carries any specific powers.In the parliamentary system of government, the chief minister is treated as the "first among equals" in the cabinet; the position of deputy chief minister is used to bring political stability and strength within a coalition government. The position of deputy chief minister is not explicitly defined or mentioned in the Constitution of India. However, the Supreme Court of India has stated that the appointment of deputy chief ministers is not unconstitutional. The court has clarified that a deputy chief minister, for all practical purposes, remains a minister in the council of ministers headed by the chief minister and does not draw a higher salary or perks compared to other ministers.During the absence of the chief minister, the deputy-chief minister may chair cabinet meetings and lead the assembly majority. Various deputy chief ministers have also taken the oath of secrecy in line with the one that chief minister takes. This oath has also sparked controversies.

== List of deputy chief ministers ==
Sr. No.	Name	Portrait	Constituency	Term of office			Political party	Chief Minister	Ref
1	Dasarath Deb		Ramchandraghat	1 May 1983	5 February 1988	4 years, 280 days	Communist Party of India (Marxist)	Nripen Chakraborty	
2	Baidyanath Majumder		Chandipur	1993	1997		Communist Party of India (Marxist)	Dasarath Deb	
3	Jishnu Dev Varma		Charilam	9 March 2018	2 March 2023	4 years, 358 days	Bharatiya Janata Party	Biplab Kumar Deb; Manik Saha	

== Oath as the state deputy chief minister ==
The deputy chief minister serves five years in the office. The following is the oath of the Deputy chief minister of state:

I, <Name of Deputy Chief Minister>, do swear in the name of God/solemnly affirm that I will bear true faith and allegiance to the Constitution of India as by law established, that I will uphold the sovereignty and integrity of India, that I will faithfully and conscientiously discharge my duties as a Minister for the State of () and that I will do right to all manner of people in accordance with the Constitution and the law without fear or favour, affection or ill-will.

Oath of Secrecy

"I, [Name], do swear in the name of God / solemnly affirm that I will not directly or indirectly communicate or reveal to any person or persons any matter which shall be brought under my consideration or shall become known to me as a Minister for the State of [Name of State] except as may be required for the due discharge of my duties as such Minister.Benglish: "Ami, [Name], Ishwarer name shapath koritechhi / driptobhabe ghoshona koritechhi je, ami biniyomito bhabe sthapito Bharat-er Shongbidhaner proti prokrito bishwash o anugotto poshwan koribo; ami Bharat-er sharbovoumotto o akhandata rakhya koribo; ami [State Name] rajyer montri hishebe amar kortobbyo nishtha o bibek-er shathe palon koribo; ebong ami bhoy ba pokkhopat, anurag ba birag-er urdhw-e uthiya, Shongbidhan o ain onujayi shob prokarer manusher proti naybichar koribo.""Ami, [Name], Ishwarer name shapath koritechhi / driptobhabe ghoshona koritechhi je, [State Name] rajyer montri hishebe amar bibechanar jonne jaha ona hobe ba jaha amar gochor hobe, taha ami protyokkho ba porokkhobhabe konobyakti ba byaktiborgoke janatbo na ba prokash koribo na; kebolmatro montri hishebe amar kortobbyo suthubhabe paloner jonne jodi taha proyojon hoy, tobei ami taha prokash koribo."==See also ==

- List of current Indian deputy chief ministers
