= Pabitra Kar =

Indian politician

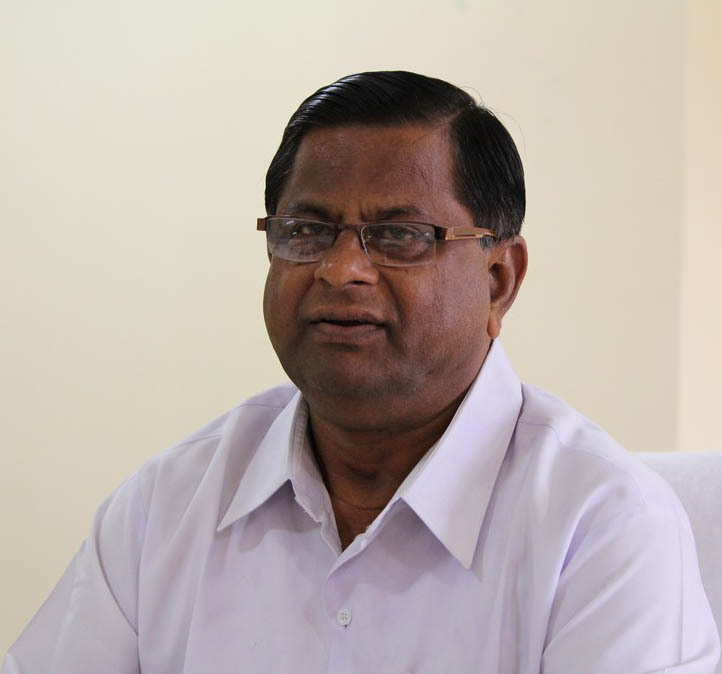

Deputy Speaker of Tripura Legislative Assembly
- In office 18 March 2013 – 8 March 2018
- Preceded by: Bhanu Lal Saha
- Succeeded by: Biswa Bandhu Sen

Chairman of Tripura Industrial Development Corporation
- In office 2008–2013

Minister of Industry
- In office 1998–2004

Member of Legislative Assembly, Tripura
- In office 1993–2018
- Preceded by: Ratan Lal Ghosh
- Succeeded by: Ratan Chakraborty
- Constituency: Khayerpur

Personal details
- Born: 17 June 1949 (age 77) Khayerpur, Tripura,India
- Party: Communist Party of India (Marxist)
- Spouse: Rama Das
- Children: 1 (Daughter)
- Parent(s): Pramode Chandra Kar(Father); Rajlaxmi Kar(Mother)
- Education: Maharaja Bir Bikram College
- Profession: Politician

Pabitra Kar (born 17 June 1949) is an Indian politician. He was the 11th deputy Speaker of the Tripura Legislative Assembly, from 18 March 2013 to 2018. In a political career spanning five decades, Kar was a senior leader of the Communist Party of India (Marxist) and occupied several portfolios in the Government of Tripura. Prior to his election as Deputy Speaker, Kar was Industry Minister of Tripura from 1998 to 2004. He was Chairman (2008–2013) of the Tripura Industrial Development Corporation. He describes himself as a politician, social worker and farmer.

== Early life and career ==
Kar was born to a Bengali family. His father was Promode Chandra Kar and mother Rajlaxmi Kar. He attended the MBB College in Agartala, then affiliated to University of Calcutta, and earned a BSc in Pure Science with distinction in 1971. Kar is married to Rama Das and the two have a daughter who is a qualified engineer. In 2013, he won re-election by just 1000 votes. The next time it was expected that he would face tough competition there. He was succeeded as deputy speaker by Shri Biswa Bandhu Sen, 21 June 2018. He was member of the Tripura Legislative Assembly from the Khayerpur constituency from 1993 to 2018. In the 2018 Tripura Legislative Assembly election he was defeated by the Bharatiya Janata Party candidate Ratan Chakrabarty.

== See also ==
- Manik Sarkar
- Manik Dey
- Badal Chowdhury
