= TIDC =

TIDC may refer to:

- Tripura Industrial Development Corporation
- tumour-infiltrating dendritic cells
