= Agartala Assembly constituency =

Constituency of the Tripura legislative assembly in India

Coordinates: 23.847°N 91.289°E

Agartala
- Constituency No. 6 for the Tripura Legislative Assembly

Constituency details
- Country: India
- Region: Northeast India
- State: Tripura
- District: West Tripura
- Established: 1972
- Total electors: 52,849
- Reservation: None

Member of Legislative Assembly
- 13th Tripura Legislative Assembly
- Incumbent Sudip Roy Barman
- Party: INC
- Elected year: 2023

Agartala Vidhan Sabha constituency is one of the 60 assembly constituencies of Tripura, a northeastern state of India. It is a part of Tripura West Lok Sabha constituency.

== Members of the Legislative Assembly ==
Year	Name	Party
1977	Ajoy Biswas	Independent politician
1983	Manik Sarkar	Communist Party of India (Marxist)
1988	Maharani Bibhu Kumari Devi	Indian National Congress
1993	Nripen Chakraborty	Communist Party of India (Marxist)
1998	Sudip Roy Barman	Indian National Congress
2003	Sudip Roy Barman	Indian National Congress
2008	Sudip Roy Barman	Indian National Congress
2013	Sudip Roy Barman	Indian National Congress
2018	Sudip Roy Barman	Bharatiya Janata Party
2022 by-election	Sudip Roy Barman	Indian National Congress
2023	Sudip Roy Barman	Indian National Congress

== Election results ==
=== 2023 Assembly election ===
2023 Tripura Legislative Assembly election: Agartala
Party	Candidate	Votes	%	±%
INC	Sudip Roy Barman	26,435	57.35	▲13.45
BJP	Papia Dutta	18,273	39.64	▲3.71
NOTA	None of the Above	562	1.22	▲0.18
Margin of victory		8,162	17.71	▲9.74
Turnout		46,092	87.60	▲10.74
INC hold		Swing	▲13.45	

=== 2022 Assembly by-election ===
2022 Tripura Legislative Assembly by-election: Agartala
Party	Candidate	Votes	%	±%
INC	Sudip Roy Barman	17,431	43.91%	▲42.49
BJP	Ashok Sinha	14,268	35.94%	▼19.53
CPI(M)	Krishna Majumder	6,808	17.15%	New
AITC	Panna Deb	842	2.12%	▲1.46
NOTA	None of the Above	411	1.04%	New
Margin of victory		3,163	7.97%	▼8.26
Turnout		39,700	76.29%	▼15.93
Registered electors		51,913		▲5.44
INC gain from BJP		Swing	▼11.56	

=== 2018 Assembly election ===
2018 Tripura Legislative Assembly election: Agartala
Party	Candidate	Votes	%	±%
BJP	Sudip Roy Barman	25,234	55.47%	▲53.52
CPI(M)	Krishna Majumder	17,852	39.24%	▼6.53
INC	Prashanta Sen Chowdhury	646	1.42%	▼50.87
NOTA	None of the Above	344	0.76%	New
AITC	Panna Deb	302	0.66%	New
Margin of victory		7,382	16.23%	▲9.71
Turnout		45,494	90.73%	▲0.77
Registered electors		49,233		
BJP gain from INC		Swing	▲3.18	

=== 2013 Assembly election ===
2013 Tripura Legislative Assembly election: Agartala
Party	Candidate	Votes	%	±%
INC	Sudip Roy Barman	22,160	52.29%	▲1.47
CPI(M)	Sankar Prasad Datta	19,398	45.77%	▼0.64
BJP	Sushil Roy	823	1.94%	▲0.67
Margin of victory		2,762	6.52%	▲2.10
Turnout		42,381	92.14%	▲4.38
Registered electors		46,252		
INC hold		Swing		

=== 2008 Assembly election ===
2008 Tripura Legislative Assembly election: Agartala
Party	Candidate	Votes	%	±%
INC	Sudip Roy Barman	21,019	50.82%	▼1.43
CPI(M)	Bikash Roy	19,194	46.41%	▲1.47
BJP	Milan Chakraborty	528	1.28%	▲0.21
Independent	Shibani Bhowmik	389	0.94%	New
AITC	Lalit Mohan Goswami	231	0.56%	▲0.02
Margin of victory		1,825	4.41%	▼2.90
Turnout		41,361	88.15%	▲11.60
Registered electors		47,407		▲0.42
INC hold		Swing	▼1.43	

=== 2003 Assembly election ===
2003 Tripura Legislative Assembly election: Agartala
Party	Candidate	Votes	%	±%
INC	Sudip Roy Barman	18,656	52.24%	▲3.24
CPI(M)	Sankar Das	16,046	44.94%	▲2.21
BJP	Nilmani Deb	381	1.07%	▼7.07
Independent	Surendra Debnath	239	0.67%	New
AITC	Dulal Das	194	0.54%	New
Independent	Shibani Bhowmik	193	0.54%	New
Margin of victory		2,610	7.31%	▲1.03
Turnout		35,709	75.88%	▼1.15
Registered electors		47,207		▲10.35
INC hold		Swing	▲3.24	

=== 1998 Assembly election ===
1998 Tripura Legislative Assembly election : Agartala
Party	Candidate	Votes	%	±%
INC	Sudip Roy Barman	16,098	49.00%	▲6.56
CPI(M)	Krishna Rakshit (Datta)	14,036	42.72%	▼9.38
BJP	Sujit Kumar Datta	2,672	8.13%	▲4.53
Margin of victory		2,062	6.28%	▼3.39
Turnout		32,852	78.65%	▼0.06
Registered electors		42,781		▲8.48
INC gain from CPI(M)		Swing		

=== 1993 Assembly election ===
1993 Tripura Legislative Assembly election: Agartala
Party	Candidate	Votes	%	±%
CPI(M)	Nripen Chakraborty	15,792	52.11%	▲2.70
INC	Sudip Roy Barman	12,863	42.44%	▼7.28
BJP	Ajit Bardhan	1,092	3.60%	New
Independent	Gouri Bhattachaerjee	285	0.94%	New
Margin of victory		2,929	9.66%	▲9.35
Turnout		30,307	77.73%	▼4.01
Registered electors		39,438		▲24.10
CPI(M) gain from INC		Swing	▲2.39	

=== 1988 Assembly election ===
1988 Tripura Legislative Assembly election: Agartala
Party	Candidate	Votes	%	±%
INC	Maharani Bidhu Kumari Debi	12,776	49.72%	▲3.13
CPI(M)	Manik Sarkar	12,695	49.40%	▼2.77
Margin of victory		81	0.32%	▼5.27
Turnout		25,696	82.00%	▲1.51
Registered electors		31,780		▲23.86
INC gain from CPI(M)		Swing		

=== 1983 Assembly election ===
1983 Tripura Legislative Assembly election: Agartala
Party	Candidate	Votes	%	±%
CPI(M)	Manik Sarkar	10,623	52.18%	New
INC	Promode Ranjandas Gupta	9,485	46.59%	▲38.41
Independent	Bhupesh Chandra Debnath	132	0.65%	New
Independent	Krishna Debbarma	120	0.59%	New
Margin of victory		1,138	5.59%	▼49.71
Turnout		20,360	80.44%	▲2.48
Registered electors		25,659		▲25.93
CPI(M) gain from Independent		Swing	▼16.03	

=== 1977 Assembly election ===
1977 Tripura Legislative Assembly election: Agartala
Party	Candidate	Votes	%	±%
Independent	Ajoy Biswas	10,682	68.20%	New
TPCC	Kamal Kumar Singha	2,021	12.90%	New
JP	Brajesh Chakraborty	1,501	9.58%	New
INC	Baby Gupta	1,281	8.18%	New
Independent	Satya Ranjan Chakraborty	177	1.13%	New
Margin of victory		8,661	55.30%	
Turnout		15,662	78.14%	
Registered electors		20,375		
Independent win (new seat)				

== See also ==
- Agartala
- List of constituencies of Tripura Legislative Assembly
- West Tripura district
