= 1984 Indian general election in Tripura =

The 1984 Indian general election in Tripura was held to elect representatives of the 2 seats in the Lok Sabha.

The Indian National Congress won all the two seats of Tripura and won two-thirds of the votes.

== Results by Party ==
Party Name	Popular vote			Seats		
Party Name	Votes	%	±pp	Contested	Won	+/−
CPI(M)	4,63,362	50.47		2	2	
INC	4,18,779	45.61		2	0	
BJP	7,070	0.77		1	0	
IND	28,949	3.15		5	0	Steady
Total	9,18,160	100%	-	10	2	-

== Elected MPs ==
Constituency		Winner			Runner-up			Margin
No.	Name	Candidate	Party	Votes	Candidate	Party	Votes	Margin
1	Tripura West	Ajoy Biswas	CPI(M)	232,339	Sudhir Ranjan Majumder	INC	228,819	3,520
2	Tripura East (ST)	Baju Ban Riyan	CPI(M)	231,023	Kirit Bikram Kishore Debbarman	INC	189,960	41,063
