= Boxanagar Assembly constituency =

Legislative Assembly constituency in Tripura State, India

Coordinates: 23.63°N 91.17°E

Boxanagar
- Constituency No. 20 for the Tripura Legislative Assembly

Constituency details
- Country: India
- Region: Northeast India
- State: Tripura
- District: Sipahijala
- Lok Sabha constituency: Tripura West
- Established: 1972
- Total electors: 43,145
- Reservation: None

Member of Legislative Assembly
- 13th Tripura Legislative Assembly
- Incumbent Tafajjal Hossain
- Party: Bharatiya Janata Party
- Elected year: 2023

Boxanagar is one of the 60 Legislative Assembly constituencies of Tripura state in India. It is in Sipahijala district and is a part of West Tripura Lok Sabha constituency.

== Members of the Legislative Assembly ==
Election	Member	Party
1972	Munsur Ali	Indian National Congress
1977	Arabar Rahaman	Communist Party of India
1983	Araber Rahaman	Communist Party of India
1988	Billal Miah	Indian National Congress
1993	Sahid Chowdhury	Communist Party of India
1998	Billal Miah	Indian National Congress
2003	Sahid Chowdhury	Communist Party of India
2008	Sahid Chowdhury	Communist Party of India
2013	Sahid Chowdhury	Communist Party of India
2018	Sahid Chowdhury	Communist Party of India
2023	Samsul Haque	Communist Party of India
2023 by-election	Tafajjal Hossain	Bharatiya Janata Party

== Election results ==
=== 2023 Assembly by-election ===
Tafajjal Hossain became the first Muslim MLA from Bharatiya Janata Party in Tripura Legislative Assembly. He defeated Mizan Hossain of Communist Party of India (Marxist) by a margin of 30,237 votes. It's the highest margin in Tripura history.

2023 Tripura Legislative Assembly by-election: Boxanagar
Party	Candidate	Votes	%	±%
BJP	Tafajjal Hossain	34,146	88.97%	▲51.21
CPI(M)	Mizan Hussain	3,909	10.18%	▼40.16
NOTA	None of the Above	434	1.13%	▲0.24
Margin of victory		30,237	78.78%	▲66.20
Turnout		38,380	89.86%	▼0.54
Registered electors		43,225		▲0.19
BJP gain from CPI(M)		Swing	▲38.62	

=== 2023 Assembly election ===
2023 Tripura Legislative Assembly election: Boxanagar
Party	Candidate	Votes	%	±%
CPI(M)	Samsul Haque	19,404	50.34%	▼7.35
BJP	Tafajjal Hossain	14,555	37.76%	▲3.35
TMP	Abu Khayer Miah	3,010	7.81%	New
AITC	Joydal Hossain	916	2.38%	▲1.33
NOTA	None of the Above	342	0.89%	New
Independent	Safiqul Islam	316	0.82%	New
Margin of victory		4,849	12.58%	▼10.70
Turnout		38,543	89.39%	▼1.60
Registered electors		43,145		▲13.97
CPI(M) hold		Swing		

=== 2018 Assembly election ===
2018 Tripura Legislative Assembly election: Boxanagar
Party	Candidate	Votes	%	±%
CPI(M)	Sahid Chowdhury	19,862	57.69%	▲4.49
BJP	Baharul Islam Majumder	11,847	34.41%	▲32.98
INC	Billal Miah	1,866	5.42%	▼39.94
NOTA	None of the Above	453	1.32%	New
AITC	Najir Islam	359	1.04%	New
Margin of victory		8,015	23.28%	▲15.44
Turnout		34,426	90.85%	▼4.86
Registered electors		37,857		
CPI(M) hold		Swing	▲4.49	

=== 2013 Assembly election ===
2013 Tripura Legislative Assembly election: Boxanagar
Party	Candidate	Votes	%	±%
CPI(M)	Sahid Chowdhury	17,100	53.21%	▲3.66
INC	Billal Miah	14,579	45.36%	▼1.70
BJP	Mantu Sarkar	460	1.43%	▲0.25
Margin of victory		2,521	7.84%	▲5.36
Turnout		32,139	96.30%	▲1.85
Registered electors		33,550		
CPI(M) hold		Swing		

=== 2008 Assembly election ===
2008 Tripura Legislative Assembly election: Boxanagar
Party	Candidate	Votes	%	±%
CPI(M)	Sahid Chowdhury	13,791	49.55%	▼3.95
INC	Billal Miah	13,099	47.06%	▲3.06
BJP	Gopal Chandra Das	330	1.19%	New
CPI(ML)L	Chale Ahammed	309	1.11%	New
Independent	Bahar Mia Khandakar	303	1.09%	New
Margin of victory		692	2.49%	▼7.01
Turnout		27,832	94.46%	▲7.82
Registered electors		29,627		▲4.60
CPI(M) hold		Swing	▼3.95	

=== 2003 Assembly election ===
2003 Tripura Legislative Assembly election: Boxanagar
Party	Candidate	Votes	%	±%
CPI(M)	Sahid Chowdhury	13,051	53.50%	▲5.57
INC	Billal Miah	10,735	44.01%	▼6.11
Independent	Anich Ahamed Chowdhury	343	1.41%	New
AITC	Dipak Das	265	1.09%	New
Margin of victory		2,316	9.49%	▲7.31
Turnout		24,394	86.20%	▼1.48
Registered electors		28,324		▲16.82
CPI(M) gain from INC		Swing	▲3.39	

=== 1998 Assembly election ===
1998 Tripura Legislative Assembly election: Boxanagar
Party	Candidate	Votes	%	±%
INC	Billal Miah	10,645	50.12%	▲15.27
CPI(M)	Sahid Chowdhury	10,182	47.94%	▼8.77
BJP	Harun Miah	397	1.87%	▼0.23
Margin of victory		463	2.18%	▼19.68
Turnout		21,241	89.12%	▲4.10
Registered electors		24,245		▲2.88
INC gain from CPI(M)		Swing		

=== 1993 Assembly election ===
1993 Tripura Legislative Assembly election: Boxanagar
Party	Candidate	Votes	%	±%
CPI(M)	Sahid Chowdhury	11,161	56.71%	▲8.42
INC	Tahera Begum	6,858	34.85%	▼16.62
Independent	Nurul Haque Maisan	1,095	5.56%	New
BJP	Sadhan Debnath	414	2.10%	New
Independent	Bijoy Dey	113	0.57%	New
Margin of victory		4,303	21.86%	▲18.69
Turnout		19,681	84.48%	▼6.65
Registered electors		23,566		▲26.85
CPI(M) gain from INC		Swing	▲5.24	

=== 1988 Assembly election ===
1988 Tripura Legislative Assembly election: Boxanagar
Party	Candidate	Votes	%	±%
INC	Billal Miah	8,621	51.47%	▲2.98
CPI(M)	Araber Rahaman	8,089	48.29%	▼2.92
Margin of victory		532	3.18%	▲0.45
Turnout		16,750	91.32%	▲2.71
Registered electors		18,578		▲18.49
INC gain from CPI(M)		Swing		

=== 1983 Assembly election ===
1983 Tripura Legislative Assembly election: Boxanagar
Party	Candidate	Votes	%	±%
CPI(M)	Araber Rahaman	7,022	51.21%	▲4.11
INC	Munsur Ali	6,648	48.49%	▲11.61
Margin of victory		374	2.73%	▼7.50
Turnout		13,711	88.79%	▲4.41
Registered electors		15,679		▲16.71
CPI(M) hold		Swing	▲4.11	

=== 1977 Assembly election ===
1977 Tripura Legislative Assembly election: Boxanagar
Party	Candidate	Votes	%	±%
CPI(M)	Arabar Rahaman	5,255	47.10%	▲16.82
INC	Munsur Ali	4,114	36.88%	▼17.82
TPCC	Sultan Mia	1,206	10.81%	New
JP	Himangshu Debnath	581	5.21%	New
Margin of victory		1,141	10.23%	▼14.18
Turnout		11,156	84.81%	▲11.82
Registered electors		13,434		▲38.20
CPI(M) gain from INC		Swing	▼7.59	

=== 1972 Assembly election ===
1972 Tripura Legislative Assembly election: Boxanagar
Party	Candidate	Votes	%	±%
INC	Munsur Ali	3,787	54.69%	New
CPI(M)	Phani Bhushan Bhakta	2,097	30.29%	New
Independent	Amrita Kumar Roy	1,040	15.02%	New
Margin of victory		1,690	24.41%	
Turnout		6,924	74.34%	
Registered electors		9,721		
INC win (new seat)				

== See also ==
- List of constituencies of the Tripura Legislative Assembly
- Sipahijala district
- Tripura West (Lok Sabha constituency)
