= Khayerpur Assembly constituency =

Legislative Assembly constituency in Tripura State, India

Coordinates: 23.85°N 91.34°E

Khayerpur
- Constituency No. 5 for the Tripura Legislative Assembly

Constituency details
- Country: India
- Region: Northeast India
- State: Tripura
- District: West Tripura
- Lok Sabha constituency: Tripura West
- Established: 1977
- Total electors: 51,278
- Reservation: None

Member of Legislative Assembly
- 13th Tripura Legislative Assembly
- Incumbent Ratan Chakraborty
- Party: Bharatiya Janata Party
- Elected year: 2023

Khayerpur is one of the 60 Legislative Assembly constituencies of Tripura state in India. It is in West Tripura district and a part of Tripura West (Lok Sabha constituency).

== Members of the Legislative Assembly ==
Election	Member	Party
1977	Akhil Debnath	Communist Party of India
1983	Sudhir Ranjan Majumder	Indian National Congress
1988	Ratan Lal Ghosh	Indian National Congress
1993	Pabitra Kar	Communist Party of India
1998	Pabitra Kar	Communist Party of India
2003	Pabitra Kar	Communist Party of India
2008	Pabitra Kar	Communist Party of India
2013	Pabitra Kar	Communist Party of India
2018	Ratan Chakraborty	Bharatiya Janata Party
2023	Ratan Chakraborty	Bharatiya Janata Party

== Election results ==
=== 2023 Assembly election ===
2023 Tripura Legislative Assembly election: Khayerpur
Party	Candidate	Votes	%	±%
BJP	Ratan Chakraborty	22,453	47.48	▼8.38
CPI(M)	Pabitra Kar	18,343	38.79	▼1.65
TMP	Lakshmi Nag (Barman)	5,147	10.88	New
AITC	Tejen Das	830	1.76	New
NOTA	None of the Above	520	1.10	▲0.36
Margin of victory		4,110	8.69	▼6.73
Turnout		47,293	92.35	▼3.40
Registered electors		51,278		▲7.44
BJP hold		Swing	▼8.38	

=== 2018 Assembly election ===
2018 Tripura Legislative Assembly election: Khayerpur
Party	Candidate	Votes	%	±%
BJP	Ratan Chakraborty	25,496	55.86	▲54.17
CPI(M)	Pabitra Kar	18,457	40.44	▼10.29
INC	Sukhamay Saha	482	1.06	▼46.53
NOTA	None of the Above	336	0.74	New
Independent	Ashim Sarkar	240	0.53	New
Margin of victory		7,039	15.42	▲12.28
Turnout		45,644	94.37	▲0.36
Registered electors		47,729		▲9.98
BJP gain from CPI(M)		Swing	▲5.13	

=== 2013 Assembly election ===
2013 Tripura Legislative Assembly election: Khayerpur
Party	Candidate	Votes	%	±%
CPI(M)	Pabitra Kar	20,972	50.72	▲1.06
INC	Baptu Chakraborty	19,675	47.59	▲0.56
BJP	Nilima Ghosh	698	1.69	▲0.00
Margin of victory		1,297	3.14	▲0.50
Turnout		41,345	95.37	▲2.95
Registered electors		43,397		
CPI(M) hold		Swing		

=== 2008 Assembly election ===
2008 Tripura Legislative Assembly election: Khayerpur
Party	Candidate	Votes	%	±%
CPI(M)	Pabitra Kar	18,833	49.67	▼7.34
INC	Ratan Chakraborty	17,832	47.03	▲4.03
BJP	Pranjit Banik	639	1.69	New
AITC	Putul Ghosh	615	1.62	New
Margin of victory		1,001	2.64	▼11.38
Turnout		37,919	92.35	▲12.92
Registered electors		41,072		
CPI(M) hold		Swing	▼7.34	

=== 2003 Assembly election ===
2003 Tripura Legislative Assembly election: Khayerpur
Party	Candidate	Votes	%	±%
CPI(M)	Pabitra Kar	16,429	57.01	▲7.91
INC	Lakhsmi Nag	12,390	42.99	▼4.32
Margin of victory		4,039	14.02	▲12.23
Turnout		28,819	79.50	▼2.99
Registered electors		36,296		▲11.01
CPI(M) hold		Swing		

=== 1998 Assembly election ===
1998 Tripura Legislative Assembly election: Khayerpur
Party	Candidate	Votes	%	±%
CPI(M)	Pabitra Kar	13,226	49.10	▼0.98
INC	Sudhir Ranjan Majumder	12,745	47.31	▼1.00
BJP	Pranjit Banik	910	3.38	▲2.55
Margin of victory		481	1.79	▲0.03
Turnout		26,937	84.11	▲0.31
Registered electors		32,696		▲3.20
CPI(M) hold		Swing		

=== 1993 Assembly election ===
1993 Tripura Legislative Assembly election: Khayerpur
Party	Candidate	Votes	%	±%
CPI(M)	Pabitra Kar	13,022	50.07	▲1.38
INC	Ratan Lal Ghosh	12,565	48.32	▼2.68
BJP	Harigopal Das	215	0.83	New
Margin of victory		457	1.76	▼0.54
Turnout		26,005	83.28	▼2.90
Registered electors		31,683		▲25.85
CPI(M) gain from INC		Swing		

=== 1988 Assembly election ===
1988 Tripura Legislative Assembly election: Khayerpur
Party	Candidate	Votes	%	±%
INC	Ratan Lal Ghosh	10,910	50.99	▼1.99
CPI(M)	Pabitra Kar	10,419	48.70	▲3.27
Margin of victory		491	2.29	▼5.26
Turnout		21,395	86.25	▲3.06
Registered electors		25,176		▲27.97
INC hold		Swing		

=== 1983 Assembly election ===
1983 Tripura Legislative Assembly election: Khayerpur
Party	Candidate	Votes	%	±%
INC	Sudhir Ranjan Majumder	8,539	52.98	▲36.11
CPI(M)	Akhil Debnath	7,321	45.43	▲0.03
Independent	Haripada Bhowmik	133	0.83	New
Independent	Nalini Parsad Dass	123	0.76	New
Margin of victory		1,218	7.56	▼20.97
Turnout		16,116	83.34	▲4.95
Registered electors		19,673		▲17.85
INC gain from CPI(M)		Swing	▲7.58	

=== 1977 Assembly election ===
1977 Tripura Legislative Assembly election: Khayerpur
Party	Candidate	Votes	%	±%
CPI(M)	Akhil Debnath	5,833	45.40	New
INC	Amar Ranjan Gupta	2,168	16.87	New
TPCC	Sachindra Lal Singha	2,161	16.82	New
JP	Naren Chandra Datta	1,479	11.51	New
TUS	Nil Kanta Debbarma	1,102	8.58	New
Independent	Sital Chandra Das	105	0.82	New
Margin of victory		3,665	28.53	
Turnout		12,848	78.93	
Registered electors		16,693		
CPI(M) win (new seat)				

== See also ==
- List of constituencies of the Tripura Legislative Assembly
- West Tripura district
