= Biren Dutta =

Indian politician

Birendra Chandra Dutta (1910 – 18 December 1992) was an Indian communist politician. He founded the communist movement in Tripura. Dutta was a member of the 1st Lok Sabha (lower house of the parliament of India, 1952–1957), the 3rd Lok Sabha (1962–1967) and the 5th Lok Sabha (1971–1977).

== Early life ==
Dutta was born in Agartala in 1910 to Jogneswar Dutta. He studied at Calcutta University. He was linked to the Anushilan Samiti revolutionary movement. He was arrested in 1933. Just before his arrest he had come into contact with the communist movement. Dutta was released from jail in May 1938, after which he travelled back to Tripura to build a branch of the Communist Party there. His work was conducted under the supervision of the Comilla Divisional Committee of the Communist Party. Dutta and his associated founded the Janamangal Samiti ('People's Welfare Association') in 1938. Dutta served as assistant secretary of Janamangal Samiti and was the editor/publisher of its publication Projar Katha.

When the Janshiksha Samiti ('People's Educational Association') was founded in 1945, Dutta played a key role as an organizer, despite not officially being part of the leadership of the movement. Dutta obtained full membership in the Communist Party of India just before the 2nd Party Congress held in Calcutta, which he attended. After the party congress, Dutta sought to build a movement amongst the tribal people of Tripura. But soon the Tripura Government began a crack-down against the nascent communist movement. Dutta left for the hills, where he began to build a revolutionary movement, the Mukti Parishad ('Liberation Council'). Whilst Dutta was a key organizer of the movement, he did not join the executive of the organization as it was an organization of tribal people. Dutta and others in the leadership were ultimately arrested.

== Political career ==
At the end of the armed struggle of Mukti Parishad, the ban on the Communist Party was lifted. Dutta was released from Tezpur Jail in 1950. The CPI fielded him as its candidate in the 1952 Indian general election for the Tripura West constituency. The CPI contested the elections in Tripura on a 4-point program: abolition of the Chief Commissioner's administration, rehabilitation schemes for both Bengali refugees and tribals, land reform and an end to repressive laws. He won the seat, obtaining 53,592 votes (68.84%).

By the 1957 Indian general election Tripura West and Tripura East had been merged to a two-seat constituency. Dutta lost his parliamentary seat, obtaining 119,798 votes.

Dutta returned to the Lok Sabha in the 1962 Indian general election, winning the Tripura West seat with 86,084 votes (52.12%).

Dutta lost the Tripura West seat in the 1967 Indian general election, now standing as a candidate of the Communist Party of India (Marxist). He finished in second place with 92,143 votes (42.25%). The result was challenged, with accusations of rigging, but the Supreme Court of India awarded the victory to the Indian National Congress candidate.

He returned to parliament in the 1971 Indian general election, obtaining 88,264 votes (45.18%).

Dutta contested the Ramnagar seat in the 1977 Tripura Legislative Assembly election. He won the seat with 8,420 votes (63.41%). After the election Dutta urged the party leadership to install tribal leader Dasarath Deb as Chief Minister. Instead the party selected Bengali Nripen Chakraborty, a move Dutta called 'a big mistake'. Dutta later argued that had the party selected a tribal Chief Minister at this juncture, the violent upheaval that Tripura experienced could have been avoided.

Dutta was a minister in the Tripura state government between 1978 and 1985. He retained the Ramnagar seat in the 1983 Tripura Legislative Assembly election, obtaining 8,026 votes (50.80%).

Dutta served as the state secretary of the Centre of Indian Trade Unions between 1970 and 1990.

== Personal life ==
Dutta married Saraju Dutta in 1945, and the couple had five children (three sons and two daughters). He served as commissioner of Agartala Municipality. Over the years he worked as editor of many newspapers, such as Tripura Rajaer Katha, Tripurar Katha, Desher Dak and Desher Katha.

In 1991 Dutta's health deteriorated and he was relieved of party duties. He died on 18 December 1992.
