= Town Bordowali Assembly constituency =

Legislative Assembly constituency in Tripura State, India

Coordinates: 23.82°N 91.27°E

Town Bordowali
- Constituency No. 08 for the Tripura Legislative Assembly

Constituency details
- Country: India
- Region: Northeast India
- State: Tripura
- District: West Tripura
- Lok Sabha constituency: Tripura West
- Established: 1977
- Total electors: 47,162
- Reservation: None

Member of Legislative Assembly
- 13th Tripura Legislative Assembly
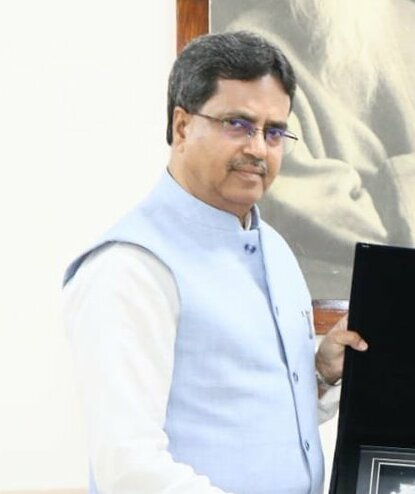
- Incumbent Manik Saha
- Party: Bharatiya Janata Party
- Elected year: 2023

Town Bordowali is one of the 60 Legislative Assembly constituencies of Tripura state in India. It is in West Tripura district and is part of Tripura West (Lok Sabha constituency).Chief minister of state represents this constituency.

== Members of the Legislative Assembly ==
Election	Member	Party
1977	Brajagopal Roy	All India Forward Bloc
1983	Ashok Kumar Bhattacharya	Indian National Congress
1988	Sudhir Ranjan Majumdar	Indian National Congress
1993	Brajagopal Roy	All India Forward Bloc
1998	Ashok Kumar Bhattacharya	Indian National Congress
2003	Ashok Kumar Bhattacharya	Indian National Congress
2008	Sudhir Ranjan Majumdar	Indian National Congress
2013	Ashish Kumar Saha	Indian National Congress
2018	Ashish Kumar Saha	Bharatiya Janata Party
2022 by-election	Manik Saha	Bharatiya Janata Party
2023	Manik Saha	Bharatiya Janata Party

== Election results ==
=== 2023 Assembly election ===
2023 Tripura Legislative Assembly election: Town Bordowali
Party	Candidate	Votes	%	±%
BJP	Manik Saha	19,586	49.77%	▼2.42
INC	Ashish Kumar Saha	18,329	46.58%	▲12.93
AITC	Ananta Banerjee	639	1.62%	▼1.37
NOTA	None of the Above	351	0.89%	▼0.20
Independent	Ramkrishna Debnath	198	0.50%	New
Margin of victory		1,257	3.19%	▼15.35
Turnout		39,350	83.65%	▲12.89
Registered electors		47,162		▲1.08
BJP hold		Swing	▼2.42	

=== 2022 Assembly by-election ===
2022 Tripura Legislative Assembly by-election: Town Bordowali
Party	Candidate	Votes	%	±%
BJP	Manik Saha	17,181	52.19%	▼8.14
INC	Ashish Kumar Saha	11,077	33.65%	▲30.42
AIFB	Raghunath Sarkar	3,376	10.26%	▼22.32
AITC	Sanhita Bhattacharya (Banerjee)	986	3.00%	New
NOTA	None of the Above	360	1.09%	New
Independent	Ramkrishna Debnath	165	0.50%	New
Margin of victory		6,104	18.54%	▼9.22
Turnout		32,917	70.12%	▼17.57
Registered electors		46,658		▲2.11
BJP hold		Swing	▼8.14	

=== 2018 Assembly election ===
2018 Tripura Legislative Assembly election: Town Bordowali
Party	Candidate	Votes	%	±%
BJP	Ashish Kumar Saha	24,293	60.33%	▲59.06
AIFB	Biswanath Saha	13,115	32.57%	▼6.83
INC	Ratna Datta	1,303	3.24%	▼54.22
NOTA	None of the Above	303	0.75%	New
SUCI(C)	Shibani Bhowmik	202	0.50%	New
Margin of victory		11,178	27.76%	▲9.71
Turnout		40,265	85.97%	▲1.33
Registered electors		45,696		
BJP gain from INC		Swing	▲2.88	

=== 2013 Assembly election ===
2013 Tripura Legislative Assembly election: Town Bordowali
Party	Candidate	Votes	%	±%
INC	Ashish Kumar Saha	22,474	57.45%	▲3.02
AIFB	Shyamal Roy	15,414	39.41%	▲38.09
BJP	Manoj Kanti Debroy	498	1.27%	▼0.20
Independent	Sujit Paul	354	0.91%	New
AMB	Debajit Roy	206	0.53%	New
Margin of victory		7,060	18.05%	▲5.68
Turnout		39,116	86.86%	▼2.23
Registered electors		45,070		
INC hold		Swing	▲3.02	

=== 2008 Assembly election ===
2008 Tripura Legislative Assembly election: Town Bordowali
Party	Candidate	Votes	%	±%
INC	Sudhir Ranjan Majumdar	14,190	54.43%	▲1.27
CPI(M)	Dr. Sudhir Chandra Majumder	10,965	42.06%	New
BJP	Rakhal Chakraborty	384	1.47%	New
AIFB	Maya Saha	344	1.32%	▼42.25
LJP	Papri Haldar	187	0.72%	▲0.05
Margin of victory		3,225	12.37%	▲2.78
Turnout		26,070	89.30%	▲15.50
Registered electors		29,287		▼4.71
INC hold		Swing	▲1.27	

=== 2003 Assembly election ===
2003 Tripura Legislative Assembly election: Town Bordowali
Party	Candidate	Votes	%	±%
INC	Ashok Kumar Bhattacharya	12,010	53.16%	▼1.55
AIFB	Brajagopal Roy	9,844	43.57%	▲6.65
Independent	Nisith Das	331	1.46%	New
AITC	Dilip Kumarr Paul	259	1.15%	New
LJP	Papri Haldar	150	0.66%	New
Margin of victory		2,166	9.59%	▼8.20
Turnout		22,594	73.74%	▼4.08
Registered electors		30,733		▲14.86
INC hold		Swing	▼1.55	

=== 1998 Assembly election ===
1998 Tripura Legislative Assembly election: Town Bordowali
Party	Candidate	Votes	%	±%
INC	Ashok Kumar Bhattacharya	11,357	54.70%	▲9.13
AIFB	Brajagopal Roy	7,665	36.92%	▼14.73
BJP	Arjun Chandra Das	1,662	8.01%	New
Margin of victory		3,692	17.78%	▲11.71
Turnout		20,761	79.22%	▲2.72
Registered electors		26,756		▼2.90
INC gain from AIFB		Swing		

=== 1993 Assembly election ===
1993 Tripura Legislative Assembly election: Town Bordowali
Party	Candidate	Votes	%	±%
AIFB	Brajagopal Roy	10,658	51.66%	▲9.44
INC	Purnima Bhattacharjee	9,404	45.58%	▼11.45
Independent	Ashok Kumar Bhattacharjee	195	0.95%	New
Independent	Uttam Chowdhury	120	0.58%	New
AMB	Mantu Paul	114	0.55%	New
Independent	Chandra Kumar Sutradhar	110	0.53%	New
Margin of victory		1,254	6.08%	▼8.73
Turnout		20,633	75.94%	▼5.43
Registered electors		27,556		▲22.43
AIFB gain from INC		Swing	▼5.37	

=== 1988 Assembly election ===
1988 Tripura Legislative Assembly election: Town Bordowali
Party	Candidate	Votes	%	±%
INC	Sudhir Ranjan Majumdar	10,308	57.03%	▲4.08
AIFB	Brajagopal Roy	7,631	42.22%	▼2.88
Margin of victory		2,677	14.81%	▲6.96
Turnout		18,076	81.35%	▲2.28
Registered electors		22,508		▲20.95
INC hold		Swing		

=== 1983 Assembly election ===
1983 Tripura Legislative Assembly election: Town Bordowali
Party	Candidate	Votes	%	±%
INC	Ashok Kumar Bhattacharya	7,689	52.95%	▲43.70
AIFB	Brajagopal Roy	6,549	45.10%	▼17.66
JP	Dulal Das Gupta	92	0.63%	▼15.73
IC(S)	Tapas Dey	92	0.63%	New
Independent	Pradipbikash Roy	77	0.53%	New
Margin of victory		1,140	7.85%	▼38.55
Turnout		14,522	79.31%	▲1.32
Registered electors		18,610		▲14.87
INC gain from AIFB		Swing	▼9.81	

=== 1977 Assembly election ===
1977 Tripura Legislative Assembly election: Town Bordowali
Party	Candidate	Votes	%	±%
AIFB	Brajagopal Roy	7,800	62.76%	New
JP	Dwijen Dey	2,034	16.37%	New
TPCC	Dilip Kumar Sarkar	1,343	10.81%	New
INC	Biswanath Chakraborty	1,149	9.25%	New
Independent	Uttam Kumar Das	102	0.82%	New
Margin of victory		5,766	46.40%	
Turnout		12,428	77.93%	
Registered electors		16,201		
AIFB win (new seat)				

== See also ==
- List of constituencies of the Tripura Legislative Assembly
- West Tripura district
