= Billal Miah =

Indian politician

Former Minister of the Tripura Legislative Assembly
- In office 1998–2003
- Preceded by: Sahil Chouwdhury
- Succeeded by: Sahil Chouwdhury
- Constituency: Boxanagar
- In office 1988–1993
- Preceded by: Arabar Rahman
- Succeeded by: Sahil Chouwdhury

President of Minority Morcha BJP, Tripura Pradesh
- Incumbent
- Assumed office Dec 2023

Former Working President of Tripura Pradesh Congress Committee
- In office Sep 2021 – Aug 2023

Chairman of Tripura Pradesh Congress Committee Minority Department
- In office Dec 2014 – Jan 2018

President of Tripura Pradesh Youth Congress Committee
- In office 1994–2002

Personal details
- Born: 15 May 1960 (age 66)
- Party: Bharatiya Janata Party
- Spouse: Nasreen Sultana
- Parent(s): Maharam Ali (Father); Sahara Begam (Mother)
- Education: Calcutta University; MBB College (B.A Political Science)
- Occupation: Politician

Billal Miah (born 15 May 1963) is an Indian politician from Tripura. He is a former member of the Tripura Legislative Assembly representing the Boxanagar constituency, serving from 1988 to 1993 and 1998 to 2003. He was the working President of the Tripura Pradesh Congress Committee before leaving INC to join the Bharatiya Janata Party on 24 August 2023.

== Personal life ==
Billal Miah was born on 15 May 1960 in Sonamura to Maharam Ali and Sahara Begam. He completed his schooling at NCI Institution, Sonamura, Tripura in 1981 and attended the University of Calcutta for further studies. He graduated in 1985 with a degree in political science from MBB College. Billal Miah married Nasreen Sultana on 16 December 1991. They have a son, Sabbir Ahammed Belali, and a daughter, Nusrat Jahan Sultana.

== Political career ==
Billal Miah entered politics in 1979, as NSUI General Secretary, Sonamura Sub division. He became Tripura Pradesh Youth Congress President, Sonamura Sub Division in 1983, and State Youth Congress secretary 1985. In 1988 Billa Miah was elected to the Tripura Legislative Assembly from the Boxanagar constituency,. He was appointed Minister of State for Agriculture, Fishery and Animal Resources, Planning Coordination, and Flood Control. In 1991 he was appointed Cabinet Minister for Animal Resources, Labour and Employment Statistics.

In 1998, he was again elected as MLA from Boxanagar.

From 1998 to Aug 2023, the positions held by him in the Tripura Pradesh Congress Committee included:

- Working President of the Tripura Pradesh Congress Committee.
- Former President of the Tripura Pradesh Youth Congress Committee
- Former General Secretary of the Tripura Pradesh Congress Committee
- Former Vice President of the Tripura Pradesh Congress Committee
- Former Chairman of the Tripura Pradesh Congress Committee Minority Department, 2014.
- Former Sonamura District Congress President, Tripura Pradesh Congress Committee

On 25 August 2023 he was welcomed into the BJP by Chief Minister Manik Saha. On 30 December 2023, he was appointed as the State President of the Minority Morcha BJP, Tripura Pradesh.
