= Sudip Roy Barman =

Indian politician from Tripura

Member of the Tripura Legislative Assembly
- Incumbent
- Assumed office 1998
- Constituency: Agartala

Cabinet Minister, Government of Tripura
- In office March 2018 – June 2019
- Governor: Tathagata Roy
- Chief Minister: Biplab Kumar Deb
- Ministry and Departments: Health & Family Welfare; PWD (Including DWS); Industries & Commerce (Including IT); Science, Technology & Environment
- Succeeded by: Biplab Kumar Deb; Jishnu Dev Varma

Vice President, Tripura Youth Congress
- In office 1994–1996

General Secretary, Tripura Youth Congress
- In office 1991–1993

Personal details
- Born: 4 February 1966 (age 60) Agartala, Tripura, India
- Party: Indian National Congress (1986–2016, 2022–present)
- Spouse: Pinaki Ganguli
- Parent: Samir Ranjan Barman (father)
- Education: NIT Agartala (B.Tech); University of Calcutta (B.E); Tripura University (LLB)
- Occupation: Politician; Businessman

Sudip Roy Barman is an Indian politician from Tripura. He served as MLA of the Tripura Legislative Assembly from the Agartala constituency which he held since 1998 by winning four elections consecutively on the INC ticket. In 2018, he contested from the Agartala constituency and won on the BJP ticket. On 7 February 2022, he quit the BJP and resigned from his MLA post. On 8 February he rejoined the Indian National Congress in Delhi. On 23 June 2022, he again contested the Agartala constituency and won on the INC ticket defeating his nearest rival of the BJP by more than 3500 votes.

== Early life and education ==
Sudip Roy Barman was born in Agartala to Samir Ranjan Barman & Maya Roy Barman. His father Samir Barman served as the Chief Minister of Tripura from 1992 to 1993. Barman holds a degree in Mechanical Engineering from Calcutta University and a Law degree from the Tripura Government Law College. During his college days, Barman was actively involved with NSUI, the student wing of the Indian National Congress. In 1986 he was elected as the General Secretary of the NSUI. In the early '90s, Barman emerged as a prominent INC youth leader. He was appointed the General Secretary of the Tripura Youth Congress in 1991 which he held up to 1994 before getting appointed the Vice President. In 1997 Barman was voted as a member of the Tripura Pradesh Congress Committee & later appointed the vice president of the Tripura Pradesh Congress Committee in 2001.

== Personal life ==
Barman is actively involved in the anti-dowry movement, and he is a well-known figure in Tripura for his active participation in blood donation camps. Approximately 200 units of blood have been donated by the Tripura Youth Congress. He participated in the National Seminar on the prevention of AIDS held in New Delhi in 2002. Every year he distributes books to down-trodden students.

== Political career ==
Barman contested an assembly election for the first time in 1993 from the Agartala constituency against former CPI(M) Chief Minister Nripen Chakraborty and lost. Later, in 1998 Barman contested the same constituency & defeated CPI(M) leader Krishna Rakshit by a margin of 2062 votes. He won 5 consecutiveassembly elections since 1998 defeating prominent Communist leaders Dr. Bikash Roy, Sankar Prasad Datta, and Krishna Rakshit respectively. In 2016, he was one of the six MLAs from Indian National Congress who joined the All India Trinamool Congress, due to various perceived inconsistencies with the Indian National Congress allying with the Communist Party of India (Marxist) in the 2016 West Bengal Legislative Assembly election. On 7 August 2017, he along with 5 other AITC MLAs of the Tripura Legislative Assembly joined the BJP in the presence of Himanta Biswa Sarma and Dharmendra Pradhan after they voted against party lines in the 2017 Indian presidential election. In March 2018, Barman was appointed Health Minister designated with other portfolios at the Biplab Deb Cabinet, but was removed shortly after due to his anti-party activities. On 7 February 2022, he and MLA Ashish Kumar Saha resigned from their MLA post and quit the BJP. On 8 February, Barman, along with his supporters, rejoined the INC.

== Controversy ==
- On 19 December 2016, Barman snatched the silver mace belonging to the Speaker of the Legislative Assembly and ran off with it while INC and AITC MLAs were criticizing Forest Minister Naresh Jamatia over womanizing.
- On 2012, he and his brother Sandip beat an on-duty Army Officer in front of the media linked to a dispute over a refund at Tata Docomo, a store franchise owned by the Barman family in Agartala.
