= Tripura Pradesh Congress Committee =

- President: Ashish Kumar Saha
- Chairman: Birajit Sinha
- Headquarters: Congress Bhawan, P.O. Chowmuhani, Agartala-799001, Tripura
- Student wing: NSUI Tripura
- Youth wing: Tripura Youth Congress
- Women's wing: Tripura Pradesh Mahila Congress Committee
- Ideology: Populism; Social liberalism; Democratic socialism; Social democracy; Secularism
- ECI status: A State Unit of Indian National Congress
- Alliance: Indian National Developmental Inclusive Alliance (2023-present); Secular Democratic Forces (2023-present)
- Seats in Rajya Sabha: 0 / 1
- Seats in Lok Sabha: 0 / 2
- Seats in Tripura Legislative Assembly: 3 / 60
- Seats in Tripura Tribal Areas Autonomous District Council: 0 / 30

Election symbol

The Tripura Pradesh Congress Committee (or TPCC) is the unit of the Indian National Congress for the state of Tripura. It is responsible for organizing and coordinating the party's activities and campaigns within the state, as well as selecting candidates for local, state, and national elections. The president of the Tripura Congress is Birajit Sinha. The head office of the organization is Congress Bhawan, situated in Agartala.

== List of presidents ==
S.no	President	Portrait	Term		Duration
1.	Surajit Datta		5 February 2010	21 April 2012	2 years, 76 days
2.	Sudip Roy Barman		21 April 2012	28 June 2013	1 year, 68 days
3.	Diba Chandra Hrangkhawl		28 June 2013	9 January 2015	1 year, 195 days
4.	Birajit Sinha		9 January 2015	22 March 2019	4 years, 72 days
5.	Kirit Pradyot Debberman		22 March 2019	24 September 2019	186 days
6.	Pijush Kanti Biswas		24 September 2019	24 September 2021	2 years, 0 days
(4).	Birajit Sinha		24 September 2021	17 June 2023	1 year, 266 days
7.	Ashish Kumar Saha		17 June 2023	Present	3 years, 142 days

== Tripura Legislative Assembly election ==
Year	Party leader	Seats won	Change in seats	Outcome
1967	Sachindra Lal Singh	27 / 30	▲ New	Government
1972	Sukhamoy Sen Gupta	41 / 60	▲14	Government
1977	Sukhamoy Sen Gupta	0 / 60	▼41	Opposition
1983	Sudhir Ranjan Majumdar	12 / 60	▲12	Opposition
1988	Sudhir Ranjan Majumdar	25 / 60	▲13	Government
1993	Samir Ranjan Barman	10 / 60	▼15	Opposition
1998	Gopal Chandra Roy	13 / 60	▼3	Opposition
2003	Birajit Sinha	13 / 60	Steady	Opposition
2008	Samir Ranjan Barman	10 / 60	▼3	Opposition
2013	Sudip Roy Barman	10 / 60	Steady	Opposition
2018	Birajit Sinha	0 / 60	▼10	Opposition
2023	Birajit Sinha	3 / 60	▲1	Opposition

Tripura Congress Legislative Assembly seat count

== Performance in Lok Sabha ==
Lok Sabha Elections
Year	Lok Sabha	Seats contested	Seats won	Change in seats	% of votes	Vote swing	Popular vote	Outcome
1951	1st	2	0 / 2	New	25.58%	New	40,263	Government
1957	2nd	2	1 / 2	▲1	46.02%	▲20.44	2,53,241	Government
1962	3rd	2	0 / 2	▼2	42.81%	▼3.21	1,36,586	Government
1967	4th	2	2 / 2	▲2	58.25%	▲15.44	2,55,583	Government
1971	5th	2	0 / 2	▼2	36.30%	▼21.95	1,49,776	Government
1977	6th	2	1 / 2	▲1	39.74%	▲3.44	2,33,718	Opposition
1980	7th	2	0 / 2	▼1	22.61%	▼17.13	1,87,809	Government
1984	8th	2	0 / 2	Steady	45.61%	▲23.00	4,18,779	Government
1989	9th	2	2 / 2	▲2	55.50%	▲9.89	7,03,094	Opposition
1991	10th	2	2 / 2	Steady	82.83%	▲27.33	8,42,179	Government
1996	11th	2	0 / 2	▼2	34.13%	▼48.70	4,39,206	Opposition
1998	12th	2	0 / 2	Steady	42.12%	▲7.99	5,77,174	Opposition
1999	13th	2	0 / 2	Steady	13.88%	▼28.24	1,67,173	Opposition
2004	14th	2	0 / 2	Steady	14.28%	▲0.40	1,89,134	Government
2009	15th	2	0 / 2	Steady	30.75%	▲16.47	5,40,753	Government
2014	16th	2	0 / 2	Steady	15.20%	▼15.55	3,07,592	Opposition
2019	17th	2	0 / 2	Steady	25.34%	▲10.14	5,45,679	Opposition
2024	18th	1	0 / 2	Steady	11.51%	▼13.83	2,69,763	Opposition

== Structure and composition ==
S.No.	Name	Designation	Incharge
01	Ashish Kumar Saha	President	Tripura Pradesh Congress
02	Suman Laskar	Working President	Tripura Pradesh Congress
03	Manik Deb	Working President	Tripura Pradesh Congress
04	Sushanta Chakrabarty	Working President	Tripura Pradesh Congress
05	Pradeep Bardhan	Working President	Tripura Pradesh Congress

== List of current members in Tripura Legislative Assembly ==
Constituency		Party	MLA
No.	Name	Party	MLA
West Tripura district
6	Agartala	Indian National Congress	Sudip Roy Barman
9	Banamalipur	Indian National Congress	Gopal Chandra Roy
Unakoti district
53	Kailashahar	Indian National Congress	Birajit Sinha

== See also ==
- Communist Party of India (Marxist), Tripura
- Indian National Congress
- Congress Working Committee
- All India Congress Committee
- Pradesh Congress Committee
