= Samar Chowdhury =

Indian politician

Cabinet Minister of Tripura
- In office 1983–1998

Member of Tripura Legislative Assembly
- In office 1972–1998

Member of the Indian Parliament
- In office 1998–2001
- Constituency: Tripura West

Personal details
- Born: 1929 or 1930
- Died: September 10, 2001 (aged 71) New Delhi

Samar Choudhury (1929/1930 – 10 September 2001 in New Delhi) was a member of the Indian Parliament representing the Tripura West constituency of Tripura. He died 10 September 2001 at the age of 71. He was a member of the Tripura Legislative Assembly for five terms from 1972 to 1998 and was minister of Industries, Health, Labour and Animal Resource Development from 1986 to 1988 and Minister of Home Affairs and Revenue from 1993 to 1998 in the Government of Tripura.
