= Banamalipur Assembly constituency =

Legislative Assembly constituency in Tripura State, India

Coordinates: 23.84°N 91.29°E

Banamalipur
- Constituency No. 9 for the Tripura Legislative Assembly

Constituency details
- Country: India
- Region: Northeast India
- State: Tripura
- District: West Tripura
- Lok Sabha constituency: Tripura West
- Established: 1977
- Total electors: 41,466
- Reservation: None

Member of Legislative Assembly
- 13th Tripura Legislative Assembly
- Incumbent Gopal Chandra Roy
- Party: Indian National Congress
- Elected year: 2023

Banamalipur is one of the 60 Legislative Assembly constituencies of Tripura state in India. It is part of West Tripura district and a part of Tripura West (Lok Sabha constituency).

== Members of the Legislative Assembly ==
Election	Member	Party
1977	Bibekananda Bhowmik	Independent politician
1983	Sukhamoy Sen Gupta	Indian National Congress
1988	Ratan Chakraborty	Indian National Congress
1993	Ratan Chakraborty	Indian National Congress
1998	Madhu Sudhan Saha	Indian National Congress
2003	Gopal Chandra Roy	Indian National Congress
2008	Gopal Chandra Roy	Indian National Congress
2013	Gopal Chandra Roy	Indian National Congress
2018	Biplab Kumar Deb	Bharatiya Janata Party
2023	Gopal Chandra Roy	Indian National Congress

== Election results ==
=== 2023 Assembly election ===
2023 Tripura Legislative Assembly election: Banamalipur
Party	Candidate	Votes	%	±%
INC	Gopal Chandra Roy	17,128	49.58%	▲47.29
BJP	Rajib Bhattacharjee	15,759	45.61%	▼14.27
AITC	Santanu Saha	732	2.12%	New
NOTA	None of the Above	479	1.39%	▲0.92
Independent	Sujata Datta	288	0.83%	New
Margin of victory		1,369	3.96%	▼22.32
Turnout		34,548	83.47%	▼6.43
Registered electors		41,466		▲2.44
INC gain from BJP		Swing	▼10.31	

=== 2018 Assembly election ===
2018 Tripura Legislative Assembly election: Banamalipur
Party	Candidate	Votes	%	±%
BJP	Biplab Kumar Deb	21,755	59.89%	▲58.59
CPI(M)	Amal Chakraborty	12,206	33.60%	New
INC	Gopal Chandra Roy	832	2.29%	▼54.99
NOTA	None of the Above	169	0.47%	New
Margin of victory		9,549	26.29%	▲9.33
Turnout		36,327	87.37%	▲3.02
Registered electors		40,478		▲3.31
BJP gain from INC		Swing	▲2.61	

=== 2013 Assembly election ===
2013 Tripura Legislative Assembly election: Banamalipur
Party	Candidate	Votes	%	±%
INC	Gopal Chandra Roy	19,464	57.28%	▲2.60
CPI	Yudhisthir Das	13,702	40.32%	▼1.93
BJP	Gita Roy	441	1.30%	▼0.32
AMB	Dulal Chandra Talapatra	194	0.57%	New
SUCI(C)	Subrata Chakraborty	180	0.53%	New
Margin of victory		5,762	16.96%	▲4.53
Turnout		33,981	86.78%	▼0.33
Registered electors		39,182		
INC hold		Swing	▲2.60	

=== 2008 Assembly election ===
2008 Tripura Legislative Assembly election: Banamalipur
Party	Candidate	Votes	%	±%
INC	Gopal Chandra Roy	12,354	54.68%	▲2.64
CPI	Prasanta Kapali	9,546	42.25%	▼2.16
BJP	Sudhindra Chandra Dasgupta	365	1.62%	New
Independent	Nishith Das	206	0.91%	New
Margin of victory		2,808	12.43%	▲4.80
Turnout		22,595	87.44%	▲13.91
Registered electors		25,956		
INC hold		Swing	▲2.64	

=== 2003 Assembly election ===
2003 Tripura Legislative Assembly election: Banamalipur
Party	Candidate	Votes	%	±%
INC	Gopal Chandra Roy	10,437	52.03%	▼2.26
CPI	Prashanta Kapali	8,907	44.40%	▲7.57
AITC	Radhashyam Saha	464	2.31%	New
Independent	Sudhindra Dasgupta	150	0.75%	New
Margin of victory		1,530	7.63%	▼9.83
Turnout		20,059	73.40%	▼4.90
Registered electors		27,424		▲15.62
INC hold		Swing	▼2.26	

=== 1998 Assembly election ===
1998 Tripura Legislative Assembly election: Banamalipur
Party	Candidate	Votes	%	±%
INC	Madhu Sudhan Saha	10,051	54.29%	▲5.12
CPI	Prasanta Kapali	6,819	36.84%	New
BJP	Narayan Chandra Ghosh	1,440	7.78%	▲2.46
Margin of victory		3,232	17.46%	▲11.24
Turnout		18,512	79.54%	▲4.41
Registered electors		23,720		▲0.06
INC hold		Swing		

=== 1993 Assembly election ===
1993 Tripura Legislative Assembly election: Banamalipur
Party	Candidate	Votes	%	±%
INC	Ratan Chakraborty	8,583	49.17%	▼7.08
JD	Dulal Das Gupta	7,498	42.96%	New
BJP	Sankar Paul	928	5.32%	New
Independent	Nikhil Debnath	253	1.45%	New
Margin of victory		1,085	6.22%	▼7.00
Turnout		17,454	74.66%	▼7.70
Registered electors		23,705		▲25.50
INC hold		Swing	▼7.08	

=== 1988 Assembly election ===
1988 Tripura Legislative Assembly election: Banamalipur
Party	Candidate	Votes	%	±%
INC	Ratan Chakraborty	8,642	56.26%	▲3.83
CPI(M)	Bibekananda Bhowmik	6,612	43.04%	▼2.00
Margin of victory		2,030	13.22%	▲5.83
Turnout		15,361	82.43%	▼0.68
Registered electors		18,888		▲17.99
INC hold		Swing		

=== 1983 Assembly election ===
1983 Tripura Legislative Assembly election: Banamalipur
Party	Candidate	Votes	%	±%
INC	Sukhamoy Sen Gupta	6,883	52.43%	▲37.98
CPI(M)	Bibekananda Bhowmik	5,913	45.04%	New
Independent	Subrata Bhowmik	224	1.71%	New
Independent	Polin Chandra Debnath	107	0.82%	New
Margin of victory		970	7.39%	▼40.35
Turnout		13,127	82.11%	▲3.89
Registered electors		16,008		▲19.64
INC gain from Independent		Swing	▼12.00	

=== 1977 Assembly election ===
1977 Tripura Legislative Assembly election: Banamalipur
Party	Candidate	Votes	%	±%
Independent	Bibekananda Bhowmik	6,734	64.43%	New
TPCC	Priya Lal Paul	1,745	16.70%	New
INC	Tarit Mohan Dasgupta	1,511	14.46%	New
JP	Jitendra Chandra Paul	461	4.41%	New
Margin of victory		4,989	47.74%	
Turnout		10,451	79.01%	
Registered electors		13,380		
Independent win (new seat)				

== See also ==
- List of constituencies of the Tripura Legislative Assembly
- West Tripura district
