= Brajagopal Roy =

Indian politician (died 2022)

Brajagopal Roy (1935/1936 – 31 July 2022) was an Indian politician. Roy was the main leader of the All India Forward Bloc in the North-Eastern state of Tripura. He was President of the AIFB Tripura State Committee and a member of the All India Secretariat of the party.

Roy was a member of the legislative assembly of Tripura from 1978 to 1983 and from 1993 to 1998, representing the Town Bordowali constituency. In the 1998 election he lost his seat, coming second with 7665 votes (36.92%).

Roy stood as the Left Front candidate in Town Bardowali in the 2003 state legislative assembly elections. Among others, he had to face dissident Forward Bloc candidate Nitish Das. Roy came second with 9844 votes (43,57%). Das came third with 331 votes (1,46%).
