= Chief Minister of Tripura =

Leader of the executive branch of Government of Tripura

- Emblem of Tripura

- Flag of India

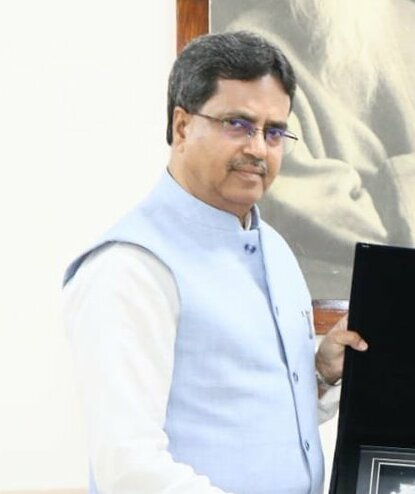
- Incumbent; Manik Saha since 15 May 2022
- Chief Minister's Office; Government of Tripura
- Style: The Honourable (formal); Mr. Chief Minister (informal)
- Type: Leader of the Executive
- Status: Head of government
- Abbreviation: CMoTripura
- Member of: Legislative Assembly; State Cabinet
- Reports to: Governor of Tripura; Tripura Legislative Assembly
- Seat: Agartala
- Appointer: Governor of Tripura; by convention based on appointees ability to command confidence in the Legislative Assembly
- Term length: At the confidence of the assembly; Chief minister's term is for five years and is subject to no term limits.
- Inaugural holder: Sachindra Lal Singh
- Formation: 1 July 1963 (63 years ago)
- Deputy: Deputy Chief Minister of Tripura
- Salary: ₹105,000 (US$1,100)
- Website: https://tripura.gov.in/chief-minister-profile

The chief minister of Tripura, an Indian state, is the head of the Government of Tripura. As per the Constitution of India, the Governor of Tripura is the state's de jure head, but de facto executive authority rests with the chief minister. Following elections to the Tripura Legislative Assembly, the governor usually invites the party (or coalition) with a majority of seats to form the government. The governor appoints the chief minister, whose council of ministers are collectively responsible to the assembly. Given that he has the confidence of the assembly, the chief minister's term is for five years and is subject to no term limits.Chief Minister also serves as Leader of the House in the Legislative Assembly.

Since 1963, Tripura has had eleven chief ministers. The first was Sachindra Lal Singh of the Indian National Congress. Manik Sarkar of the Communist Party of India (Marxist) served as chief minister of Tripura from 1998 to 2018; his reign was the longest in the state's history. The incumbent is Manik Saha, who succeeded Biplab Kumar Deb both are from Bharatiya Janata Party. First non-INC associated Nripen Chakraborty

== Oath as the state chief minister ==
The chief minister serves five years in the office. The following is the oath of the chief minister of state:

I, <Name of Chief Minister>, do swear in the name of God/solemnly affirm that I will bear true faith and allegiance to the Constitution of India as by law established, that I will uphold the sovereignty and integrity of India, that I will faithfully and conscientiously discharge my duties as a Minister for the State of () and that I will do right to all manner of people in accordance with the Constitution and the law without fear or favour, affection or ill-will.

Benglish:

"Ami, [Name], Ishwarer name shapath koritechhi / driptobhabe ghoshona koritechhi je, ami biniyomito bhabe sthapito Bharat-er Shongbidhaner proti prokrito bishwash o anugotto poshwan koribo; ami Bharat-er sharbovoumotto o akhandata rakhya koribo; ami [State Name] rajyer montri hishebe amar kortobbyo nishtha o bibek-er shathe palon koribo; ebong ami bhoy ba pokkhopat, anurag ba birag-er urdhw-e uthiya, Shongbidhan o ain onujayi shob prokarer manusher proti naybichar koribo.""Ami, [Name], Ishwarer name shapath koritechhi / driptobhabe ghoshona koritechhi je, [State Name] rajyer montri hishebe amar bibechanar jonne jaha ona hobe ba jaha amar gochor hobe, taha ami protyokkho ba porokkhobhabe konobyakti ba byaktiborgoke janatbo na ba prokash koribo na; kebolmatro montri hishebe amar kortobbyo suthubhabe paloner jonne jodi taha proyojon hoy, tobei ami taha prokash koribo."

== Chief Ministers of Tripura (1963–present) ==
- ^{†} Died in office
- ^{§} Returned to office after a previous non-consecutive term

| # | Portrait | Minister (Birth-Death) Constituency | Election | Term of office | | | Political party |
| # | Portrait | Minister (Birth-Death) Constituency | Election | From | To | Period | Political party |
Union territory of Tripura (1956–1972) (Note: After India’s independence, Tripura was a princely state under a regency following the death of Maharaja Bir Bikram Kishore Manikya in 1947. In 1949, Maharani Kanchan Prava Devi, acting as regent, signed the Tripura Merger Agreement with India, and Tripura became part of the Indian Union on 15 October 1949. Initially, it was administered as a Part C State and later became a Union Territory on 1 November 1956. It remained a Union Territory until attaining full statehood on 21 January 1972.)
| 1 | | Sachindra Lal Singh (1907–2000); MLA for Agartala Sadar II | 1963 (1st) (Note: On 1 July 1963, the Territorial Council of Union Territory of Tripura was dissolved and the first Legislative Assembly of the Union Territory of Tripura was constituted. Members of the dissolved Territorial Council became members of the first assembly and permitted to continue for the remainder of their original five year term.) | 1 July 1963 | 1 November 1971 | 8 years, 123 days | Indian National Congress |
| 1 | | Sachindra Lal Singh (1907–2000); MLA for Agartala Sadar II | 1967 (2nd) | 1 July 1963 | 1 November 1971 | 8 years, 123 days | Indian National Congress |
Position vacant (1 November 1971 – 20 January 1972); President's rule was imposed during this period (Note: President's rule may be imposed when the "government in a state is not able to function as per the Constitution", which often happens because no party or coalition has a majority in the assembly. When President's rule is in force in a state, its council of ministers stands dissolved. The office of chief minister thus lies vacant, and the administration is taken over by the governor, who functions on behalf of the central government. At times, the legislative assembly also stands dissolved.)
State of Tripura (1972–present) (Note: Tripura became a full state of India on 21 January 1972 under the North-Eastern Areas (Reorganisation) Act, 1971. After attaining statehood, Tripura received its own elected government and greater administrative powers within the Indian Union.)
Position vacant (21 January–20 March 1972) (Note: Continued since 1 November 1971. Statehood granted on 21 January 1972.); President's rule was imposed during this period
| 2 | | Sukhamoy Sen Gupta (1919–1995); MLA for Agartala Town III | 1972 (3rd) | 20 March 1972 | 1 April 1977 | 5 years, 12 days | Indian National Congress |
| 3 | | Prafulla Kumar Das (1930–?); MLA for Bamutia | 1972 (3rd) | 1 April 1977 | 26 July 1977 | 116 days | Congress for Democracy |
| 4 | | Radhika Ranjan Gupta (?–1998); MLA for Fatikroy | 1972 (3rd) | 26 July 1977 | 4 November 1977 | 101 days | Janata Party |
Position vacant (5 November 1977–5 January 1978); President's rule was imposed during this period
| 5 | | Nripen Chakraborty (1905–2004); MLA for Pramodnagar | 1977 (4th) | 5 January 1978 | 5 February 1988 | 10 years, 31 days | Communist Party of India (Marxist) |
| 5 | | Nripen Chakraborty (1905–2004); MLA for Pramodnagar | 1983 (5th) | 5 January 1978 | 5 February 1988 | 10 years, 31 days | Communist Party of India (Marxist) |
| 6 | | Sudhir Ranjan Majumdar (1939–2009); MLA for Town Bordowali | 1988 (6th) | 5 February 1988 | 19 February 1992 | 4 years, 14 days | Indian National Congress |
| 7 | | Samir Ranjan Barman (born 1942); MLA for Bishalgarh | 1988 (6th) | 19 February 1992 | 10 March 1993 | 1 year, 19 days | Indian National Congress |
Position vacant (11 March–10 April 1993); President's rule was imposed during this period
| 8 | | Dasarath Deb (1916–1998); MLA for Ramchandraghat | 1993 (7th) | 10 April 1993 | 11 March 1998 | 4 years, 335 days | Communist Party of India (Marxist) |
| 9 | | Manik Sarkar (born 1949); MLA for Dhanpur | 1998 (8th) | 11 March 1998 | 9 March 2018 | 19 years, 363 days | Communist Party of India (Marxist) |
| 9 | | Manik Sarkar (born 1949); MLA for Dhanpur | 2003 (9th) | 11 March 1998 | 9 March 2018 | 19 years, 363 days | Communist Party of India (Marxist) |
| 9 | | Manik Sarkar (born 1949); MLA for Dhanpur | 2008 (10th) | 11 March 1998 | 9 March 2018 | 19 years, 363 days | Communist Party of India (Marxist) |
| 9 | | Manik Sarkar (born 1949); MLA for Dhanpur | 2013 (11th) | 11 March 1998 | 9 March 2018 | 19 years, 363 days | Communist Party of India (Marxist) |
| 10 | | Biplab Kumar Deb (born 1971); MLA for Banamalipur | 2018 (12th) | 9 March 2018 | 15 May 2022 | 4 years, 67 days | Bharatiya Janata Party |
| 11 | | Manik Saha (born 1953); MLA for Town Bordowali | 2018 (12th) | 15 May 2022 | Incumbent | 4 years, 169 days | Bharatiya Janata Party |
| 11 | | Manik Saha (born 1953); MLA for Town Bordowali | 2023 (13th) | 15 May 2022 | Incumbent | 4 years, 169 days | Bharatiya Janata Party |

== Statistics ==
=== List by chief minister ===
Time held in office by party (as of 23 August 2026)
1. Communist Party of India (Marxist) (55.4%)
2. Indian National Congress (29.2%)
3. Bharatiya Janata Party (13.4%)
4. Janata Party (0.44%)
5. Congress for Democracy (0.50%)
6. President's Rule (1.01%)

| # | Chief Minister | Party | Term of office | |
| # | Chief Minister | Party | Longest term | Total duration |
|---|---|---|---|---|
| 1 | Manik Sarkar | CPI(M) | 19 years, 363 days | 19 years, 363 days |
| 2 | Nripen Chakraborty | CPI(M) | 10 years, 31 days | 10 years, 31 days |
| 3 | Sachindra Lal Singh | INC | 8 years, 123 days | 8 years, 123 days |
| 4 | Sukhamoy Sen Gupta | INC | 5 years, 12 days | 5 years, 12 days |
| 5 | Dasarath Deb | CPI(M) | 4 years, 335 days | 4 years, 335 days |
| 6 | Manik Saha* | BJP* | 4 years, 169 days* | 4 years, 169 days* |
| 7 | Biplab Kumar Deb | BJP | 4 years, 67 days | 4 years, 67 days |
| 8 | Sudhir Ranjan Majumdar | INC(I) | 4 years, 14 days | 4 years, 14 days |
| 9 | Samir Ranjan Barman | INC(I) | 1 year, 19 days | 1 year, 19 days |
| 10 | Prafulla Kumar Das | CFD | 116 days | 116 days |
| 11 | Radhika Ranjan Gupta | JP | 101 days | 101 days |

== See also ==
- List of Tripura ministries
