= Prafulla Kumar Das =

Indian politician

3rd Chief Minister of Tripura
- In office 1 April 1977 – 25 July 1977
- Preceded by: Sukhamoy Sen Gupta
- Succeeded by: Radhika Ranjan Gupta

Personal details
- Born: 1930 (age 95–96)
- Party: Congress for Democracy

Prafullah Kumar Das (born c. 1930) served as the Chief Minister of Tripura from 1 April 1977 to 25 July 1977.
