= Congress for Democracy =

- Leader: Jagjivan Ram; Kadidal Manjappa; Hemvati Nandan Bahuguna
- Founder: Jagjivan Ram
- Founded: 2 February 1977; 49 years ago
- Dissolved: 5 May 1977; 49 years ago
- Merged into: Janata Party

The Congress for Democracy (CFD) was an Indian political party founded in 1977 by Jagjivan Ram. It was formed after Jagjivan Ram, Hemvati Nandan Bahuguna, and Nandini Satpathy left the Indian National Congress of Indira Gandhi and denounced her rule during the Indian Emergency. The party contested the 1977 Indian general election with the Janata alliance and later merged with it.

== Formation ==
Jagjivan Ram was a senior politician within the Indian National Congress and had been a loyalist of Indira Gandhi. He had held various cabinet posts, and had served as India's defence minister during the Indo-Pakistani War of 1971. He was also the most prominent Scheduled Caste or Dalit politician in the nation.

Ram had stayed loyal to Indira after she imposed a state of emergency in 1975. However, the state of emergency had proven widely unpopular and upon calling elections in 1977, it became apparent that Indira's Indian National Congress could suffer defeat. Consequently, Ram and his supporters resigned from the government and the Indian National Congress in January 1977, denouncing Indira Gandhi and her Emergency rule.

The Congress for Democracy was launched on 2 February 1977. Jagjivan Ram became the president of the party and former Chief Minister of Uttar Pradesh Hemvati Nandan Bahuguna became the party general secretary. Other co-founders included the former Chief minister of Mysore (Now Karnataka) Kadidal Manjappa, who later became Party President, former Chief Minister of Tripura & former Member of Parliament lok sabha Sachindra Lal Singh, former Chief Minister of Orissa Nandini Satpathy, former Union Minister of State for Finance K. R. Ganesh, former M.P. Dwarka Nath Tiwary and Bihari politician Raj Mangal Pandey.

== 1977 election ==
Although the new party was mocked by Indira's Indian National Congress as the "Congress for Defectors" Jagjivan Ram's support was actively courted by the opposition Janata party alliance as he was the most influential Scheduled Caste leader in the country. While the Congress for Democracy agreed to jointly campaign and contest the election with the Janata party, it stated that it would maintain a separate organisation and identity.

In the 1977 elections, the Janata-CFD alliance won 298 seats, ousting the Indian National Congress from power for the first time in 30 years. The Congress for Democracy itself won only 28 seats, but its role in raising significant support for the Janata alliance amongst India's Scheduled Caste communities, formerly a loyal Congress base, earned it considerable influence in the formation of a new government.

== Merger with Janata ==
Along with Morarji Desai and Charan Singh, Jagjivan Ram was a leading candidate to become the new Prime Minister of India as head of the Janata-CFD coalition. Seeking to avoid a divisive contest, Janata leaders asked Jayaprakash Narayan (JP), who was seen as the spiritual leader of the party, to choose the leader, pledging to abide by his choice.

When JP chose Desai, the CFD expressed criticism at the un-democratic selection of the leader and hesitated about joining the government. However, JP and Desai coaxed Ram into joining the government as a Deputy Prime Minister of India and Minister of Defence. H. N. Bahuguna joined the Cabinet as Minister of Petroleum and Chemicals. On 5 May 1977 the Congress for Democracy announced its intention to merge its organisation with the Janata Party.

== Post-Janata ==
Despite joining the ranks of the Janata Party, CFD politicians remained specifically loyal to Jagjivan Ram. When Ram withdrew his support for the Desai government in 1979, he was supported by a significant number of former CFD MPs. With the fall of the Janata government in 1979-80, Ram and his supporters formed the Congress (J) - "J" standing for "Jagjivan", which maintained a small presence in the Indian Parliament.

Bahuguna rejoined the Congress (I) for a brief period before founding Socialist Democratic Front.

== See also ==
- Indian National Congress (Jagjivan)
- Janata Party
