= Sachindra Lal Singh =

Indian politician

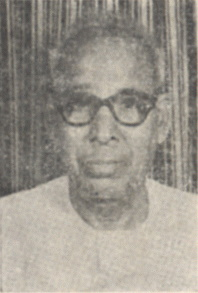
- Sachindra Lal Singh

1st Chief Minister of Tripura
- In office 1 July 1963 – 1 November 1971
- Preceded by: Office Established
- Succeeded by: President's rule Sukhamoy Sen Gupta

Member of Parliament, Lok Sabha from Tripura West
- In office 1977–1980
- Preceded by: Birendra Chandra Dutta
- Succeeded by: Ajoy Biswas

Personal details
- Born: 7 August 1907 Agartala, Kingdom of Tripura
- Died: 9 December 2000 (aged 93) New Delhi, India
- Party: Indian National Congress, Janata Party
- Spouse: Smti. Laxmi Singh

Sachindra Lal Singh (7 August 1907 – 9 December 2000) was a leader of the Indian National Congress and the first Chief Minister of Tripura state in northeastern India from 1 July 1963 to 1 November 1971. In 1977, he became the leader of the newly formed Congress for Democracy party. He was elected to the sixth Lok Sabha from Tripura West constituency as a member of the Congress for Democracy. Sachindralal Singh, the first Chief Minister of Tripura, was a highly popular leader of Tripura. He was fondly called “Sachin-da” and was highly admired for his simplicity and amiable nature.

== Family and early life ==
His father, Shri Deen Dayal Singh who hailed from Kashi (Varanasi), played a major role in the military establishment of the Kingdom of Tripura and settled at Agartala permanently. Sachin-da passed his academic term at Victoria College (British India), where he began his political activities as a member of “Bhatri Sangh”, an organisation of youths of Agartala. The members of the Sangh were linked to the Jugantar Party of Bengal from around the year 1920.

== Struggle for Indian independence (1924–1947) ==
There was no Congress organisation in the Princely States before India achieved independence. An organisation named Gana Parishad used to work in Hill Tripura as a substitute of Congress. It may be noted that in the pre-independent India Princely Tripura was known as “Hill Tripura” and there was also a Tipperah District of the then Bengal province adjacent to it. The people of Hill Tripura were also involved in the country's freedom movement and had close relations with their counterparts in British India. There was, however, no political agitation against the Maharaja of Tripura.

== Career ==
From 1946 Sachin-da extensively toured the Hills and dales of Tripura for organisational work. He had special love and care for the hills’ people. Sometime in 1950 he organised a Tribal Conference, inviting tribal leaders from all parts of Tripura to the village of Bagafa in the Belonia sub-division, which was inaugurated by the then Chief Commissioner, Mr. K K Hazra, ICS. About 200 Tribal people attended the conference. Deeply impressed and influenced by Mahatma Gandhi, he became a loyal follower, first of Gandhi and then of Jawaharlal Nehru. In 1953, at Sachin-da’s initiative, Tribal rehabilitation work, the first in Tripura. began at Bagafa with financial support from the Prime Minister’s Fund. In 1953, while he was an advisor to the Advisory Council of the Government of Tripura, Tripura welfare work was taken up by the Government. A Special Officer for Tribal Welfare was appointed and necessary funds were allotted for the purpose. When he became the first Chief Minister of Tripura, he made a special effort to upgrade the Tribal Welfare Office and give more attention to the Tribal Jhumia Settlement and other tribal welfare work.

In the General Election held in 1952 he was elected as a Member of the Tripura Electoral College. In 1956 he was elected as a Member of the Tripura Territorial Council and became its first Chairman. He was elected as a member of Tripura Territorial Council for the second time in 1967, which was subsequently converted into a Territorial Assembly to form the first government in Tripura. He was elected leader of the Congress party which held the majority in the Territorial Assembly, and formed the first democratically elected government in Tripura.

During his time in government as an advisor, as Chairman of the Territorial Council, and as Chief Minister he worked for the development of Tripura in agriculture, education, road communication and for the welfare of the people in general and Scheduled Tribes, Scheduled Castes and OBC in particular. He took care of refugees from East Pakistan for their rehabilitation. Sachin-da has been called the architect of democratic Tripura. In 1971, when he was a Chief Minister of Tripura, assisting Sheikh Mujibur Rahman and the peoples of Bangladesh in achieving their independence.

He was the first chairman of the Tripura Khadi & Village Industries Board, the Harijan Sevak Sangh, Tripura Board, Kamraj Foundation, New Delhi and chairman of Freedom Fighters Committee of the Ministry of Home Affairs Government of India, member of Telecommunication Committee etc.

== Later life and death ==
In the last phase of his life, circumstances compelled him to leave the Tripura State Congress which he had formed, and he joined the Congress For Democracy of Babu Jagjiwan Ram. In the 1977 General Election he was elected Member of the Lok Sabha from the Tripura West Lok Sabha Constituency as a candidate of the Janata Party into which the Congress for Democracy had merged. But in 1982 Prime Minister Rajiv Gandhi invite him into his family, and he rejoined the Indian National Congress. In 1982, he served as chairman of the Election Committee, Tripura Pradesh Congress Committee, and in charge of North Eastern states. He was close to H.N. Bahuguna, Smt. Nandini Satpathy, Santosh Mohan Dev, Gopinath Bardoloi, K. Kamraaj, Dr. B.C. Roy, Mohan Lal Sukhadiya and others.

Since 1977 he was living in New Delhi with his wife and children (Ashish Lal Singh, Nandita Singh, Debashish Lal Singh, Namita Singh), and died there on 9 December 2000. His body was brought to Agartala by the Government and cremated at Dashami Ghat cremation ground, Agartala, with full State Honour. He was awarded "Friends of Liberation War Honour" posthumously in 2012 by Bangladesh for his outstanding contributions in the Bangladesh Liberation War.
