= Ajoy Biswas =

Indian politician

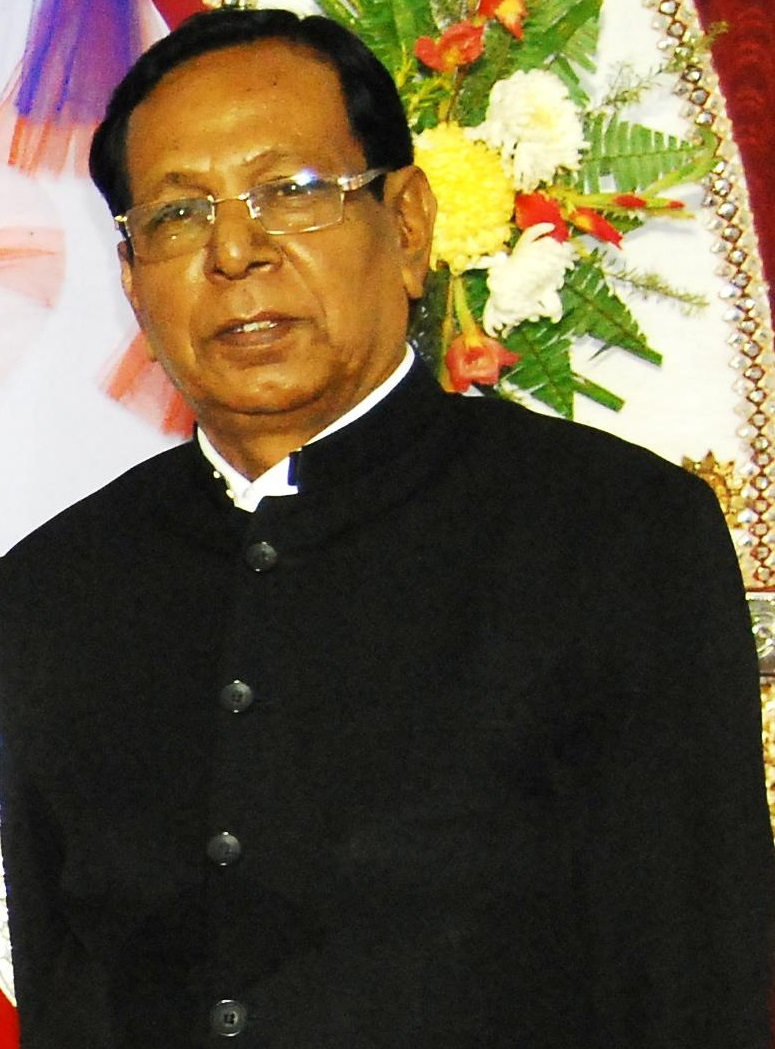
- Biswas in 2012

Member of Parliament 7th Lok Sabha, 8th Lok Sabha
- In office 1980–1989
- Preceded by: Sachindra Lal Singh, Tripura West, 1977
- Succeeded by: Santosh Mohan Dev, Tripura West, 1989
- Constituency: Agartala

Member Of Tripura Legislative Assembly
- In office 1972–1980

All India General Secretary & State President Indian Confederation Of Labor
- In office 2004–2013

Personal details
- Born: Garifa, India
- Party: Communist Party of India (Marxist), Independent
- Children: 2
- Education: Rishi Bankim Chandra Colleges
- Profession: Politician, writer, social worker

Ajoy Biswas is an Indian politician from Tripura and former member of the Communist Party of India (Marxist) (CPI(M)).

== Political career ==
Biswas started in politics by becoming an independent Member of the Legislative Assembly (MLA) in the Indian National Congress in 1972. He was elected as a MLA in Tripura, defeating the incumbent in the elections of 1977. Biswas was elected as a member of the Indian Parliament's 7th and 8th Lok Sabha from 1980 to 1989. Biswas was a trade union leader and activist in Tripura and founded several trade unions there, including the Tripura Employees Coordination Committee, and the Tripura branches of the AITUC and the DYFI. He also held important positions in several workers' unions in the state.

After the split of the Communist Party of India (CPI) in 1964, the CPI(M) came to be known as the party of the tribals in the state of Tripura. Until the early 1970s the CPI(M) was not popular in the Bengali community of the state. Biswas played an important role in building the party organisation among the Bengalis of Tripura. With this mass movement, he was able to help defeat the locally strong Indian National Congress in the elections of 1977. This played a pivotal role in bringing the CPI(M) to power in 1978.

During the 8th Lok Sabha, he took part in a debate on 31 August 1987 with the then Defence Minister K. C. Pant, in what became known in the national press as the "Bofors debate".

Biswas was a trade union leader and social worker, and several trade and workers' unions in the state were formed under his leadership. He was arrested in connection with political activities in 1966, 1969, 1971 and 1977.

== Ideological differences and formation of People's Democratic Front ==
In late 1980s Biswas became vocal against then Tripura's Chief Minister and CPI(M) president Nripen Chakraborty's style of leadership. The ideological objection was regarding Chakraborty's way of governance and non-compliance with section 112 of CPI(M) working principle, which emphasizes "more power to people" rather than government.

This ideological difference widened and led to several CPI(M) national and politburo meetings, eventually leading Biswas to quit the party and form Janganotantrik Morcha.

A number of supporters of Biswas' ideology also followed him, including the Tripura Employees Coordination Committee (TECC), originally founded by Biswas in 1968. The TECC comprises 13 unions, with the TGTA and TTA being the largest. As a result of this split Biswas retained control over the TECC unions. This eventually led to the loss of CPI(M) in the elections of 1988.

Biswas continues to campaign for Tripura employees’ demands and welfare.
