= Gopal Chandra Roy =

Indian politician

Member of the Tripura Legislative Assembly
- Incumbent
- Assumed office 2023
- Preceded by: Biplab Deb
- Constituency: Banamalipur
- In office 2003–2018
- Preceded by: Madhusudan Saha
- Succeeded by: Biplab Deb
- Constituency: Banamalipur

Personal details
- Born: Tripura, India
- Party: Indian National Congress
- Spouse: Sikha roy
- Children: Papiya Roy, Pinakshi Roy, Rumki Roy, Dipraj Roy

Gopal Chandra Roy is an Indian politician from Tripura. He serves as a member of the Tripura Legislative Assembly representing Banamalipur. He belongs to the Indian National Congress.
