= Tripura Industrial Development Corporation =

Government agency in Tripura, India

- Formation: 1974; 52 years ago
- Type: State owned
- Coordinates: 23.863006°N 91.283041°E
- Region served: Tripura
- Owner: Government of Tripura
- Chairman: Nabadal Banik
- Website: tidc.tripura.gov.in

Tripura Industrial Development Corporation or TIDC is a state governmental Industrial Development Corporation in the state of Tripura, India. It is responsible for the development and maintenance of industries in the state. Deepak Kumar an IAS is the current managing director of the corporation.

== History ==
The Tripura Industrial Development Corporation Limited (TIDC) was established in 1974 as a Private Limited Company under the company's act 1956. On top of that, provisions of State Financial Corporations Act 1951 have been extended to TIDC as well. This leads to TIDC performing the twin role of the State Industrial Development Corporation and State Financial Corporation. TIDC is a profit making PSU.
