= Ratan Chakraborty =

Indian politician

Speaker of the Tripura Legislative Assembly
- In office 2021–2023
- Preceded by: Rebati Mohan Das
- Succeeded by: Biswa Bandhu Sen
- Constituency: Khayerpur

Member of Tripura Legislative Assembly
- Incumbent
- Assumed office 2018
- Preceded by: Pabitra Kar
- Constituency: Khayerpur

Personal details
- Born: Ratan Chakraborty; 17 July 1951 (age 74) Agartala, Tripura
- Party: Bharatiya Janata Party

Ratan Chakraborty (born 17 July 1951) is an Indian politician and a member of the Tripura Legislative Assembly from the Khayerpur Assembly constituency. He is a former Speaker of the Tripura Legislative Assembly, serving between 2021 and 2023.

== Personal life ==
He was born on 17 July 1951 in Agartala, Tripura. He is married to Sharmila Debbarma and they have three daughters.
