= Samir Ranjan Barman =

Indian politician

7th Chief Minister of Tripura
- In office 19 February 1992 – 10 March 1993
- Preceded by: Sudhir Ranjan Majumdar
- Succeeded by: President's rule

Member of the Tipura Legislative Assembly
- In office 1988–2008
- Preceded by: Bhanu Lal Saha
- Succeeded by: Bhanu Lal Saha
- Constituency: Bishalgarh

Cabinet Minister, Government of Tripura
- In office 5 February 1988 – 12 February 1992
- Governor: K. V. Krishna Rao; Sultan Singh; K. V. Raghunatha Reddy
- Chief Minister: Sudhir Ranjan Majumdar

Personal details
- Born: 28 April 1940 (age 86) Kishoreganj, Mymensingh, Bengal Presidency, British India (now in Bangladesh)
- Party: Indian National Congress
- Spouse: Maya Barman
- Children: 4

Samir Ranjan Barman is an Indian politician. He served as Chief Minister of Tripura from 19 February 1992 to 10 March 1993 as a member of the Indian National Congress. He is the father of the current legislator from the Agartala constituency and Indian National Congress leader Sudip Roy Barman. He contested the Bishalgarh constituency in the Assembly elections 9 consecutive times from 1972 to 2013, being elected in the 1972 election, as well as from 1988 to 2008. He was the leader of opposition in the Tripura Legislative Assembly from 1993 to 1998. He is also the former president of the Tripura Pradesh Congress Committee.
