= Manik Sarkar =

Indian politician

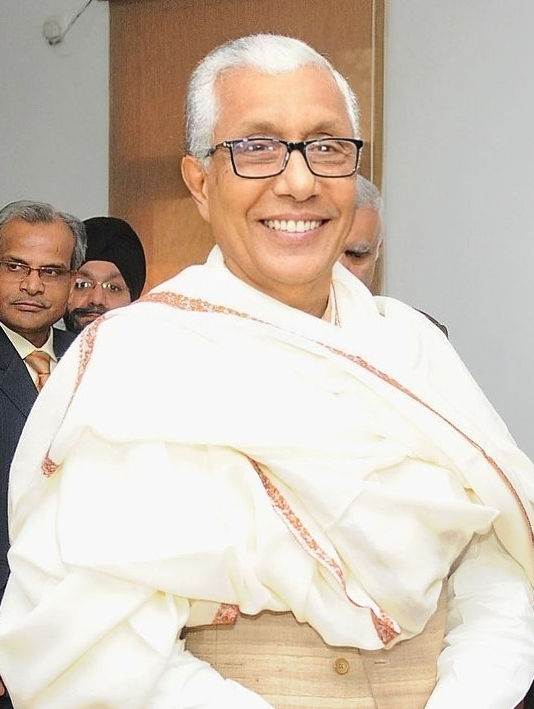

Member of Polit Bureau, Communist Party of India (Marxist)
- In office 11 October 1998 – 6 April 2025

Leader of the Opposition in Tripura
- In office 9 March 2018 – 2 March 2023
- Governor: Satyadev Narayan Arya; Ramesh Bais; Kaptan Singh Solanki; Tathagata Roy
- Preceded by: Ratan Lal Nath
- Succeeded by: Animesh Debbarma

Chief Minister of Tripura
- In office 11 March 1998 – 8 March 2018
- Governor: List: Siddheswar Prasad Krishna Mohan Seth Dinesh Nandan Sahay Kamla Beniwal D. Y. Patil Devanand Konwar Vakkom Purushothaman Padmanabha Acharya Tathagata Roy
- Preceded by: Dasarath Deb
- Succeeded by: Biplab Kumar Deb

Tripura State Secretary of the CPI(M)
- In office 1993–1998

Member of Legislative Assembly, Tripura
- In office March 1998 – 2 March 2023
- Preceded by: Samar Choudhury
- Succeeded by: Pratima Bhowmik
- Constituency: Dhanpur
- In office 1983–1988
- Preceded by: Ajoy Biswas
- Succeeded by: Bibhu Kumari Devi
- Constituency: Agartala

Personal details
- Born: 22 January 1949 (age 77) Udaipur, Tripura State, India (now Tripura, India)
- Party: Communist Party of India (Marxist)
- Spouse: Panchali Bhattacharya
- Cabinet: Fourth Manik Sarkar ministry

Manik Sarkar (born 22 January 1949) is an Indian communist politician who served as the Chief Minister of Tripura from March 1998 to March 2018. He was a member of the Politburo of the Communist Party of India (Marxist). In March 2008, he was sworn in as leader of the Left Front, the Tripura coalition government. Following the 2013 Legislative Assembly elections, he became the chief minister for the fourth consecutive time. He served as the Leader of the Opposition in the Tripura Legislative Assembly from 2018 to 2023.

== Early life and background ==
Manik Sarkar was born into a middle-class Bengali family. His father, Amulya Sarkar, worked as a tailor, while his mother, Anjali Sarkar, was a State and later Provincial government employee. Sarkar became active in student movements in his student days, and in 1968, at the age of 19, he became a member of the Communist Party of India (Marxist). He was a candidate of the Students' Federation of India throughout his academic life at MBB College, from where he graduated with a B. Com. degree. During his first year at the college there came the turbulent times of the food movement of 1967, campaigning against the policy of the then Congress government of Tripura, and Sarkar threw himself headlong into the related student struggle. His vigorous role in this mass movement led him to join the Communists. Due to his early political exposure, he also became the General Secretary of the MBB College Student Union and was also made the Vice President of the Students' Federation of India. In 1972, at the early age of 23, he joined the State Committee of the Communist Party of India (Marxist).

== Political career ==
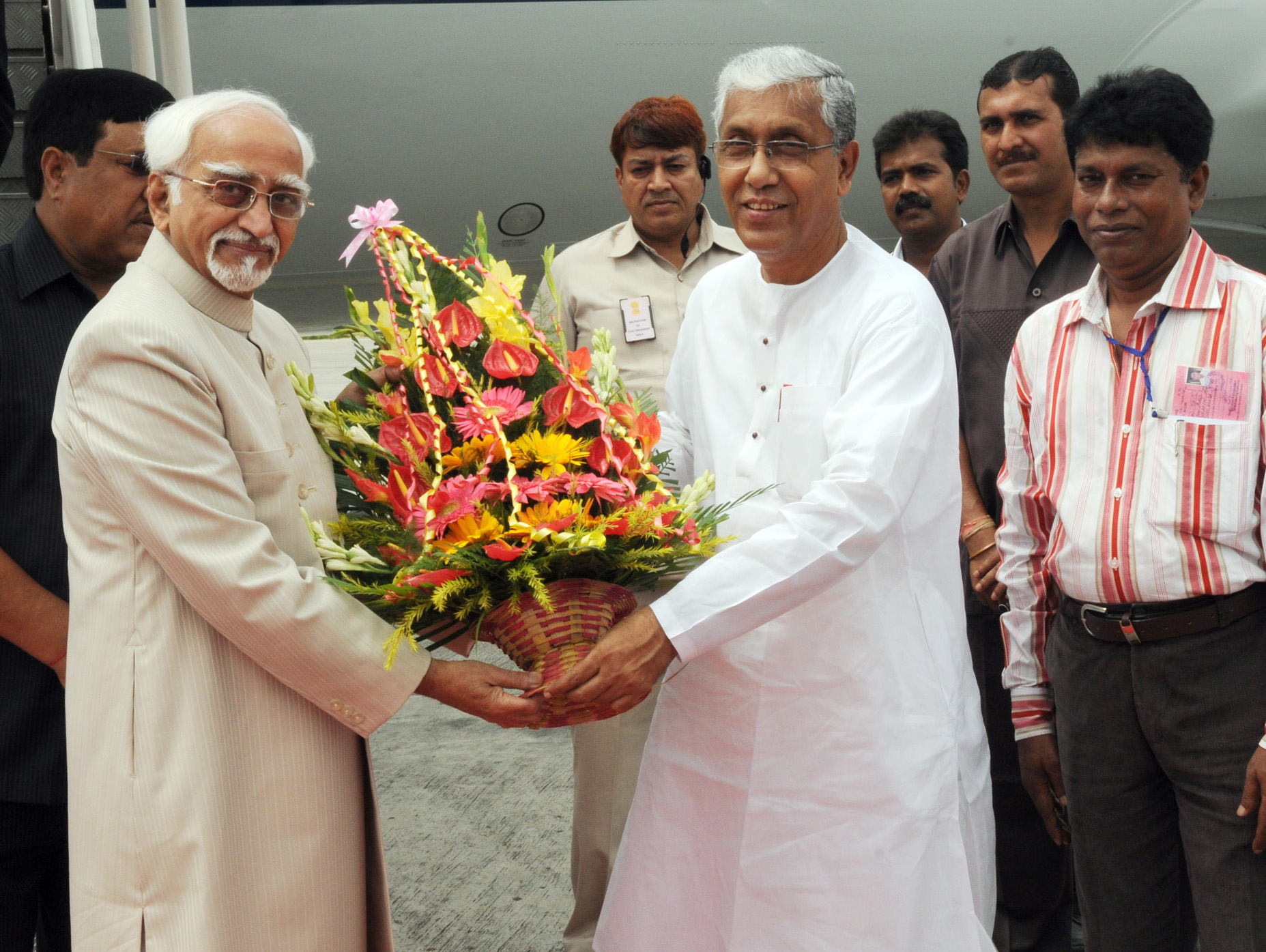
The Vice President, Shri Mohd. Hamid Ansari being received by the Chief Minister of Tripura, Shri Manik Sarkar, on his arrival at Agartala Airport, in Agartala, Tripura on 25 September 2013

In 1978, six years after being selected in the CPI (M) State Committee, Sarkar was included in the party state secretariat. This was also the year when the first Left Front government had taken control in Tripura.

In 1980, at the age of 31, he was elected as the Member of the Legislative Assembly from the Agartala constituency. This was the start of Manik Sarkar's leadership in his state. Around the same time, he was appointed the Chief Whip of the CPI (M). In 1983, he was again elected to the Assembly as MLA from Krishnanagar, Agartala. When the Left Front government took control in 1993, Sarkar was appointed the State Secretary of the CPI (M).

His biggest success would come in 1998, when ar the age of 49, he became a member of the Politburo of the CPI (M), the principal policy-making and executive committee in a Communist party. In the same year, he became the Chief Minister of the state of Tripura. Since then, he was elected to the same position four consecutive times in 20 years. He is one of the very few chief Ministers in India who was in the office for so long. His party lost majority in the 2018 elections and he had to step down as a result.

It was noted that Sarkar did not contest the 2023 elections. He revealed that he had done so in order to pave the way for younger leadership.

== Personal life ==
Sarkar is married to Panchali Bhattacharya, who was employed with the Central Social Welfare Board till she retired in 2011. He chooses to live in an old and a very small house that belonged to his great grandfather. He used to donate his entire salary that he received as Chief Minister to his party and in return received ₹ 5,000 per month as an allowance.

== Election contested ==
=== Tripura Legislative Assembly ===
Year	Constituency	Party	Votes	%	Opponent	Opponent Party	Opponent Votes	%	Result	Margin	%
2018	Dhanpur	CPI(M)	22,176	54.43	Pratima Bhoumik	BJP	16,735	41.08	Won	5,441	13.35
2013	Dhanpur	CPI(M)	21,286	57.1	Shah Alam	INC	15,269	40.96	Won	6,017	16.14
2008	Dhanpur	CPI(M)	17,992	52.91	Shah Alam	INC	15,074	44.32	Won	2,918	8.59
2003	Dhanpur	CPI(M)	15,613	55.85	Dipak Chakraborty	INC	11,111	39.74	Won	4,502	16.11
1998	Dhanpur	CPI(M)	12,771	53.9	Majibur Islam Majumder	INC	9,668	40.81	Won	3,103	13.09
1988	Agartala	CPI(M)	12,695	49.4	Bibhu Kumari Devi	INC	12,776	49.72	Lost	-81	-0.32
1983	Agartala	CPI(M)	10,623	52.18	Promode Ranjandas Gupta	INC	9,485	46.59	Won	1,138	5.59

Political offices
Preceded by Dasarath Deb	Chief Minister of Tripura; 12 December 1998 – 9 March 2018	Succeeded by Biplab Kumar Deb
