= Sukhamoy Sen Gupta =

Indian politician

2nd Chief Minister of Tripura
- In office 20 March 1972 – 31 March 1977
- Preceded by: President's rule Sachindra Lal Singh
- Succeeded by: Prafulla Kumar Das

Personal details
- Born: September 1919
- Died: 18 May 1995
- Party: Indian National Congress

Sukhamoy Sen Gupta (September 1919 – 18 May 1995), also known as Sukhamoy Sengupta, was an Indian politician. He was the second Chief Minister of Tripura in India from 1972 to 1977 as a member of the Indian National Congress.
