= Dasarath Deb =

Indian politician

Dasarath Debbarma

8th Chief Minister of Tripura
- In office 10 April 1993 – 11 March 1998
- Preceded by: Samir Ranjan Barman
- Succeeded by: Manik Sarkar

Member of parliament, Lok Sabha
- In office 1952–1967, 1971–1977
- Constituency: Tripura East

Member of Tripura Legislative Assembly
- In office 1977–1998
- Constituency: Ramchandraghat

1st Deputy Chief Minister of Tripura
- In office 1983-1988

Minister of Education and Tribal Welfare
- In office 1977-1983

Personal details
- Born: 2 February 1916 Boltali Kami, Tripura, British India
- Died: 14 October 1998 (aged 82) Agartala, Tripura, India
- Party: Communist Party of India (Marxist)
- Education: Brindaban Government College; University of Calcutta

Dasarth Debbarma (2 February 1916 – 14 October 1998) was an Indian Communist politician in the Indian state of Tripura. He was chief minister of Tripura from 1993 to 1998. He was a leader of the Ganamukti Parishad (Tripura State Indigenous People's Liberation Council) and the Communist Party of India (Marxist). He was also the vice-president of All India Kisan Sabha and the first and thus far only Tiprasa chief minister of Tripura.

== Early life ==
Dasaratha Debbarma, a legendary leader of the Indian Communist movement, was born on 2 February 1916 into a poor peasant family in the remote Boltali village in the present day Khowai district of Tripura. Since childhood, Dasaratha was very eager to obtain education but his poor family could not afford to send him to town for education. Due to his indomitable eagerness, he was later admitted to the Khowai primary school. After he passed the matriculation examinations, he was admitted to the Brindaban College of Habiganj of Sylhet District in erstwhile East Bengal, as Tripura had no college then. After obtaining his Intermediate and B.A. degree, Debbarma got admitted in Calcutta University for his M.A, while he simultaneously pursued a law degree.

In 1940, the CPI Comilla District Committee working under the Bengal Provincial Committee initiated the formation of a Party unit in Tripura. The first unit of the Party in Agartala was formed with some local youths including Comrade Biren Datta who, besides Debbarma, was elected to the first Lok Sabha from Tripura. The Agartala Branch of CPI first started building up mass organisations with the working people of Agartala, mostly Bengalis. It was decided that an organisation would be formed with the core objective of spreading education among the tribal people. Dasarath Debbarma was contacted in Kolkata and apprised of the mission. Soon, he came to Tripura, leaving his post-graduate studies never to return.

== Political career ==
In 1948, he formed the Ganamukti Parishad, which was engaged in an armed struggle from 1948 to 1950. In 1950, he along with his followers, joined the Communist Party of India. He became a member of the central committee of the party in 1951. After the party split in 1964, he joined the Communist Party of India (Marxist). In 1964, he founded the Tripura Rajya Upajati Ganamukti Parishad, a CPI (M) front organization. In the heady days of the 1930s and 40s, Deb had completed his education from Sylhet and later Calcutta. He took to spreading education among tribal through the Janasikhya Samiti.

He was elected to the Lok Sabha in 1952, 1957, 1962 and 1971 from the Tripura East constituency. In 1978, he was elected for the first time to the Tripura Vidhan Sabha from the Ramchandraghat constituency and became the Minister for Education in the first Left Front government. He was the deputy chief minister in the second Left Front government from 1983 to 1988. In 1988, he became secretary of the state unit of the CPI(M). After the defeat of the Left Front in the 1988 elections, he became the leader of the opposition in the Tripura Vidhan Sabha from 1988 to 1993.

On 10 April 1993 he became the chief minister of the third Left Front government. He was in office till 11 March 1998. He declined to contest the Vidhan Sabha election in 1998 on health grounds, and died seven months after leaving office.

== Bibliography ==
- Mukti Parishader Itikatha
- Samantatantrik Byabasthar Biruddhe Mukti Parishader Sangram
- Aamar Srmtite Tripurer Gana Andolan’ (The History of Mass Movement in my Memory)
- Kokborok lekhar pothrekha
