= Radhika Ranjan Gupta =

Indian politician

4th Chief Minister of Tripura
- In office 26 July 1977 – 4 November 1977
- Preceded by: Prafulla Kumar Das
- Succeeded by: President's rule
- Constituency: Fatikroy

Personal details
- Died: Agartala
- Party: Janata Party

Radhika Ranjan Gupta (died 15 May 1998) was an Indian politician. He was Chief Minister of Tripura in India from 26 July 1977 to 4 November 1977. At that time the socio-international situation was unfavourable. On 26 July 1977, Gupta, as the leader of a short-lived coalition between the Janata Party and the left, became the fourth Chief Minister of the state.
