= Sudhir Ranjan Majumdar =

Indian politician

- Sudhir Ranjan Majumdar

6th Chief Minister of Tripura
- In office 5 February 1988 – 19 February 1992
- Preceded by: Nripen Chakraborty
- Succeeded by: Samir Ranjan Barman

Member of Parliament, Rajya Sabha
- In office 1992-1998
- Constituency: Tripura

Personal details
- Born: 18 May 1939 Gangra, Bengal Presidency, British India (now in Bangladesh)
- Died: 4 January 2009 (aged 69) Agartala, Tripura, India
- Party: Indian National Congress
- Other political affiliations: All India Trinamool Congress
- Spouse: Milan Prava Majumdar

Sudhir Ranjan Majumdar (18 May 1939 – 4 January 2009) was the Chief Minister of Tripura in India from 5 February 1988 to 19 February 1992. He was a school teacher before entering politics. He was also a member of the Upper House of Indian parliament the Rajya Sabha as a member of the Indian National Congress representing Tripura. He was a member of the Maulika Kayastha family.
