= Nripen Chakraborty =

Indian Communist politician (1905-2004)

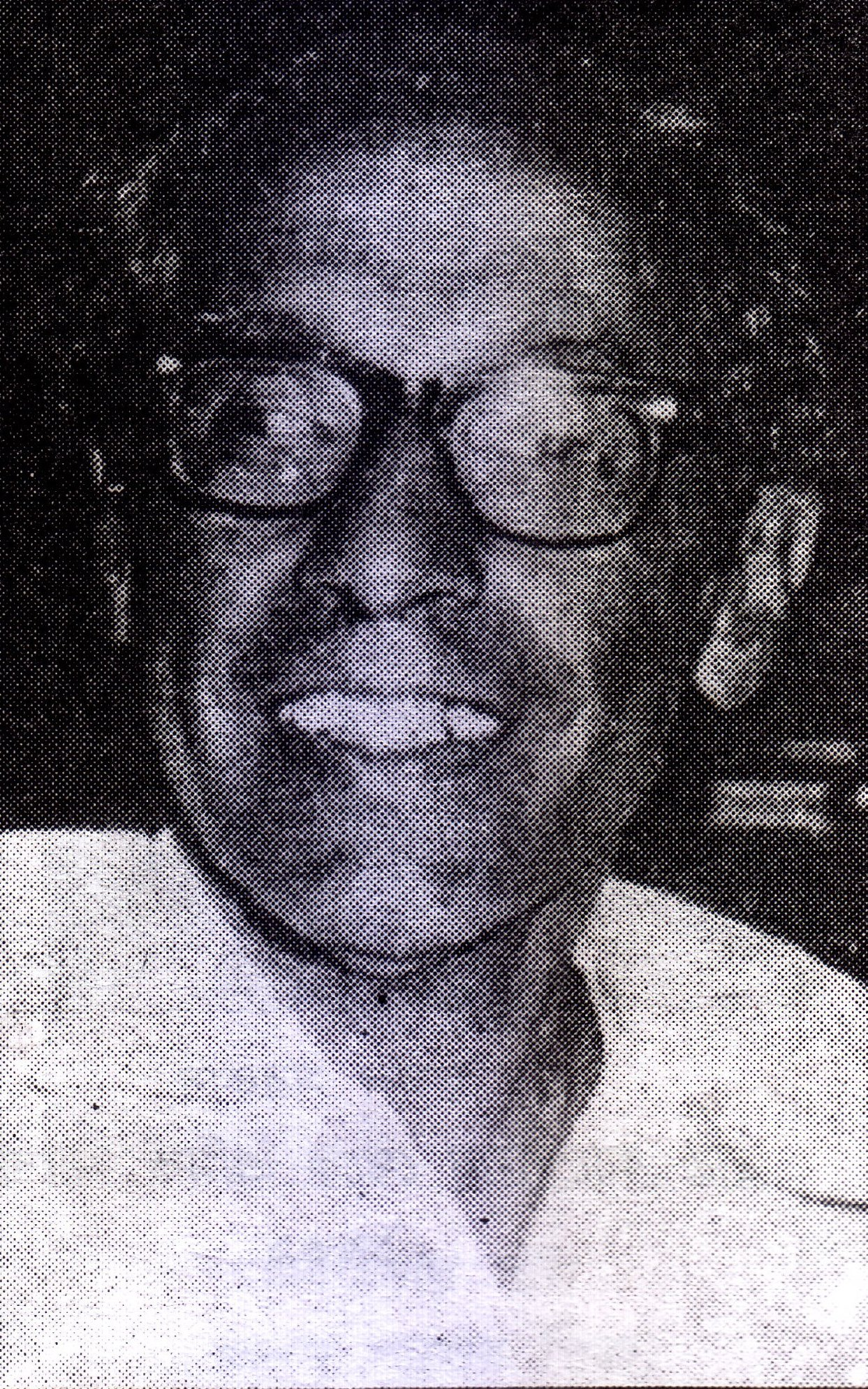

5th Chief Minister of Tripura
- In office 5 January 1978 – 5 February 1988
- Preceded by: Radhika Ranjan Gupta
- Succeeded by: Sudhir Ranjan Majumdar

Opposition Leader of Tripura Legislative Assembly
- In office 7 February 1988 - 18 February 1992
- Preceded by: Sudhir Ranjan Majumdar
- Succeeded by: Dasarath Deb
- In office 29 March 1972 - 31 March 1977
- Preceded by: (President's rule); Bidya Debbarma
- Succeeded by: Munsur Ali (Tripura politician)
- In office 1964-1967
- Preceded by: Aghore Debbarma
- Succeeded by: Bidya Debbarma

Personal details
- Born: 4 April 1905 Bikrampur, Bengal Presidency, British India (present-day Bangladesh)
- Died: 25 December 2004 (aged 99) Kolkata, West Bengal, India
- Party: Communist Party of India (Marxist)
- Education: University of Dhaka

Nripen Chakraborty (4 April 1905 – 25 December 2004) was an Indian Communist politician who served as the Chief minister of Tripura from 1978 to 1988. Nripen Chakraborty was involved in the Communist movement in India for six decades.

== Life ==
He was born at Bikrampur in Dhaka District of Bengal province of British India (present-day Bangladesh). He was the ninth child of Rajkumar and Uttamsunadari Chakraborty. He passed the entrance examination from Outsahi High School in 1925. He left his studies at Dhaka University to join the Indian freedom movement. In 1931, he took part in the civil disobedience movement. He joined the Communist Party of India in 1934. He was elected secretary of the Bengal unit of the party in 1937. In 1950, he was sent to Tripura by the party, and became an important organizer there. After the split in the CPI in 1964, he joined the Communist Party of India (Marxist). He became the secretary of the state unit of CPI(M) in 1967. He was elected to the Central Committee of the CPI(M) in 1972 and to its Politburo in June 1984.

=== In Tripura ===
Nripen Chakraborty was elected to the Tripura Territorial Council in 1957, and became the leader of the opposition in 1962. After Tripura's attainment of full statehood, he became a member of the state's Vidhan Sabha in 1972. In 1977, he was a minister in two successive short-lived coalition governments, first between the Left parties and the Congress for Democracy (CFD) and then between the Left and the Janata Party. When the Left Front won the elections on 31 December 1977, he became the chief minister and continued in office till 1988. After the defeat of the Left Front in 1988 elections, he became the leader of the opposition in Tripura Vidhan Sabha from 1988 to 1993. In 1993 elections, the Left Front again returned to power in Tripura and he became the chairman of the State Planning Board. In 1995 he was expelled from the CPI(M), but he remained a member of the Vidhan Sabha until 1998.

=== As a journalist ===
During 1939–41, he worked as a sub-editor in the Ananda Bazar Patrika. He was also the co-editor of Swadhinata, the CPI organ in Bengali. Later, he was a regular columnist in the daily Desher Katha, the mouthpiece of the CPI(M) Tripura state unit, often under his pen-name, Arup Roy till 1995.

=== The last days ===
In December 2004 he became seriously ill and was brought to IPGMER and SSKM Hospital in Kolkata. On 24 December 2004, the Politburo of the CPI(M) decided to readmit him. He died on 25 December 2004, following a cardiac arrest.
