= Saha (surname) =

- Language: Bengali

Origin
- Origin: Bengali
- Derivation: sādhu (virtuous/righteous)
- Meaning: honest or respected person
- Region of origin: Bangladesh; India (West Bengal, Assam and Tripura)

Other names
- Variant forms: Shaha, Poddar

Saha (Bengali: সাহা), occasionally also spelt Shaha, is a Bengali surname, commonly used by the Bengali Hindus in the Indian states of West Bengal, Assam, and Tripura, and in Bangladesh. The surname is commonly found among the Baishya Saha, Shunri, Karmakar, Subarna Banik, Gandhabanik, Namasudra, Baishya Kapali, Tili and some other castes of Bengal.

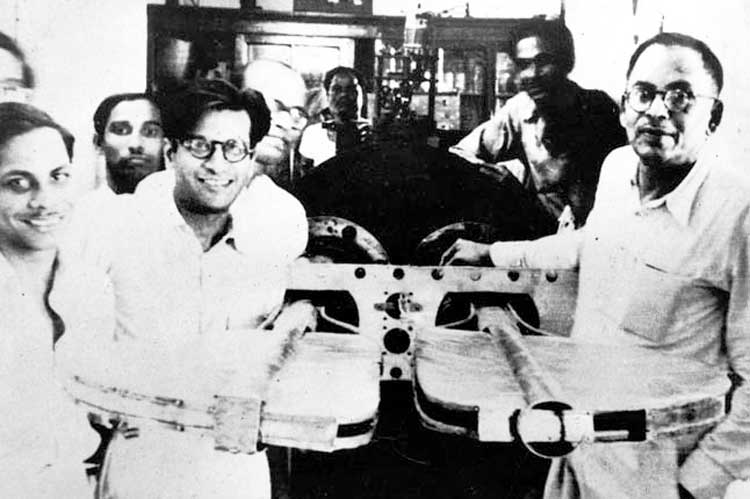
Meghnad Saha, an Indian astrophysicist and politician

== Origin ==
In early twelfth century the Chandimau image inscription of the time of Rāmapāla, year 42, mentions a donor vanika (lit. merchant) sādhu Saharaņa, the son of sādhu Bhādulva originating from Rājagrha and residing in Etrahāgrāma.

== History ==
Traditionally, Bengali Hindu society was divided into two broad varnas, Brahmin and Shudra. According to traditional social classifications, the Sahas were placed among the Jal-achal Shudra groups, whose water was considered unacceptable to the higher castes within the orthodox caste hierarchy.

The Saha community emerged as a distinct sub-caste in Bengal during the mid-nineteenth century. Traditionally associated with trade and commerce, the Sahas are mostly regarded as a merchant community. Though some of them claim to be Aryan Vaishyas, the evidence of history, literature and scriptures suggests nothing of the kind.

While they occupied a relatively low position in the ritual hierarchy, the community attained comparatively high levels of literacy and enjoyed a favourable secular status within Bengali society.

Sahas were included in the list of 177 "backward classes" for the state of West Bengal by the Mandal Commission.

== Notable people ==
=== Artists and performers ===
- Aindrila Saha, an Indian Bengali model and television actress. She mainly acts in Bengali-language TV serials.
- Arun Saha, Bangladeshi actor and musician
- Ashim Saha, Bangladeshi poet and recipient of the Ekushey Padak
- Bidya Sinha Saha Mim, Bangladeshi actress
- Debattama Saha, Indian actress
- Debojit Saha, Indian singer
- Emon Saha, a Bangladeshi composer, musician and singer. He earned 7 Bangladesh National Film Awards for his music composition and direction.
- Ena Saha, Indian actress and producer
- Ishaa Saha, Indian actress
- Karuna Shaha, Indian artist
- Mahadev Saha, a Bangladeshi poet. He was awarded the Ekushey Padak in 2001 and the Independence Day Award in 2021 by the government of Bangladesh.
- Mousumi Saha, an Indian actress.
- Pankaj Saha, A renowned Indian Bengali poet, writer, playwright and prominent television personality from eastern India.
- Pijush Saha, Indian film director
- Sajeeb Saha, a Bangladeshi producer.
- Satya Saha, Bangladeshi music director and recipient of the Independence Day Award (posthumous)
- Shithi Saha, Bangladeshi singer and four-time recipient of the national award for best Tagore singer
- Suman Saha, a Bangladeshi film actor. He won the Bangladesh National Film Award for Best Child Artist for the film Ashikkhito (1978)
- Surjit Saha, Indian actor, model, and social media influencer
- Swapan Saha, Indian film director
- Trina Saha, Indian actress

=== Politicians ===
- Ashish Kumar Saha, an Indian politician from Tripura, India. He is currently serving as President of the Tripura Pradesh Congress Committee.
- Bhanu Lal Saha, former Finance Minister of Tripura
- Dhirendra Nath Saha, a Bangladesh Nationalist Party politician and a member of parliament from Narail-1.
- Dhruba Saha, an Indian politician from West Bengal. He is a member of the West Bengal Legislative Assembly representing Rampurhat.
- Dilip Saha, an Indian politician from West Bengal. He is a member of the West Bengal Legislative Assembly from Nabagram (SC).
- Dipali Saha, an Indian politician belonging to the All India Trinamool Congress. She was elected as a legislator of the West Bengal Legislative Assembly from Sonamukhi in 2011.
- Gadadhar Saha, an Indian politician belonging to the Communist Party of India (Marxist).
- Gopal Chandra Saha, an Indian politician from the Bharatiya Janata Party. In May 2021, he was elected as a member of the West Bengal Legislative Assembly from Maldaha (constituency).
- Krishna Kanta Saha, an Indian politician from West Bengal. He is a member of the West Bengal Legislative Assembly from the Sainthia Assembly constituency.
- Mala Saha, an Indian politician from West Bengal. She is a former two-time member of the West Bengal Legislative Assembly from the Kashipur Belgachia Assembly constituency.
- Manabendranath Saha, an Indian teacher and politician belonging to the Communist Party of India (Marxist). He was a member of the West Bengal Legislative Assembly.
- Manik Saha, Chief Minister of Tripura since 2022.
- Namita Saha, an Indian politician, was elected to the West Bengal Legislative Assembly from Magrahat East as a member of the Trinamool Congress.
- Nilabati Saha, an Indian politician. She was elected to the West Bengal Legislative Assembly from Sainthia.
- Nirad Kumar Saha, an Indian politician, belonging to the Indian National Congress. He was elected to the Joynagar seat of the West Bengal Legislative Assembly in a by-election held on 6 June 1972.
- Pundarikakshya Saha, an Indian politician from West Bengal. He has been a member of the West Bengal Legislative Assembly from the Nabadwip constituency since 2001.
- Sandipan Saha, an Indian Politician and Member of the Legislative Assembly from the Entally Assembly constituency.
- Seuli Saha, an Indian politician and member of the All India Trinamool Congress. She is an MLA, elected from the Keshpur constituency in the 2016 West Bengal state assembly election. In the 2021 assembly election, she was re-elected from the same constituency.
- Subrata Saha, an eminent Indian politician who served as Minister of State for Public Works in the Government of West Bengal.
- Swarna Kamal Saha, an Indian politician and member of the All India Trinamool Congress. He is an MLA, elected from the Entally constituency in the 2011 West Bengal state assembly election. In the 2016 and 2021 assembly elections, he was re-elected from the same constituency.
- Tapas Kumar Saha, an Indian politician from West Bengal. He was a member of the West Bengal Legislative Assembly from the Tehatta Assembly constituency in Nadia district.

=== Scientists and academics ===
- Abhinandan Chandra Saha, a Bangladeshi academic. He is the Vice-Chancellor of The Millennium University, a private university located in Dhaka.
- Arunoday Saha, an Indian academic, politician and writer from Tripura. He served as the first vice-chancellor of Tripura University after it was elevated to a central university in 2007.
- Barna Saha, Indian-American computer scientist.
- Bhaskar Saha, Indian biologist and recipient of the Shanti Swarup Bhatnagar Prize.
- Chandrima Shaha, Indian biologist and recipient of the Shanti Swarup Bhatnagar Prize.
- Dhananjay Saha, a Bangladeshi-born American research scientist. He is best known for a research technique called the Saha Method.
- Kanak Saha, Indian astrophysicist and recipient of the Shanti Swarup Bhatnagar Prize.
- Meghnad Saha, Indian astrophysicist, developer of the Saha ionization equation.
- Samir Kumar Saha, Bangladeshi scientist and recipient of the Ekushey Padak.
- Saurabh Saha, an American biotech entrepreneur.
- Senjuti Saha, Bangladeshi scientist.
- Sanat Kumar Saha, Bangladeshi economist and recipient of the Ekushey Padak.

=== Sportspeople ===
- Aniruddha Saha, an Indian first-class cricketer who plays for Tripura.[1] He made his first-class debut for Tripura in the 2016-17 Ranji Trophy.
- Arati Saha, the first Asian woman to swim across the English Channel and the first Indian woman sportsperson to receive the Padma Shri award
- Bhavendramohan Saha, an Indian wrestler and weightlifter. He was also known as Bhim Bhavani or Bhimmurti.
- Nandita Saha, an Indian table-tennis player, Commonwealth bronze medalist (2006)
- Nilamber Saha, an Indian former cricketer. He played two first-class matches for Bengal between 1998 and 2000.
- Proloy Saha, an Indian footballer who played for East Bengal and the national team as a defender.
- Sanjit Saha, a Bangladeshi cricketer who plays for Rangpur Division. He made his first-class debut on 8 February 2015 in the National Cricket League
- Saraswati Saha, an Indian former sprinter. She won the 200 m gold medal at the 2002 Asian Games. She was honoured with the Arjuna Award in 2002.
- Subhajit Saha, Indian table tennis player, Commonwealth gold medalist
- Sudhir Saha, a wrestler, coach and wrestling administrator in India.
- Sumon Saha, a first-class cricketer from Bangladesh.
- Viki Saha, an Indian first-class cricketer who plays for Tripura.
- Wriddhiman Saha, Indian cricketer

=== Social workers and reformers ===
- Bhagirathi Saha, a fearless freedom fighter who was martyred in the 1971 Liberation War. A two-kilometre road in Pirojpur city was stained with her blood.
- Bhupesh Saha, a leading figure in the anti-British independence movement of the Indian subcontinent and a revolutionary. He was convicted three times in the Civil Disobedience Movement of 1930.
- Chittaranjan Saha, Bangladeshi educationist, publisher, and social worker, recipient of the Ekushey Padak
- Durgadas Saha, a physics professor and martyred intellectual. He was martyred in 1971 and was recognized as an intellectual in 2024.
- Gopinath Saha, Bengali activist and Indian independence movement member
- Gour Gopal Saha, a retired Justice of the High Court Division of the Bangladesh Supreme Court and a Hindu community activist.
- Hrishikesh Saha, a revolutionary in the anti-British independence movement of the Indian subcontinent. On 15 August 1942, revolutionaries attacked the General Post Office in Dhaka.
- Mahadev Prasad Saha, a member of a family that participated in the Sepoy Mutiny of 1857 in the Awadh region, and he himself was imprisoned for practising Satyagraha as a Congress worker during his student life.
- Nityanand Saha, Indian revolutionist
- Nityanand Saha, a freedom fighter of the Bangladesh Liberation War, the designer of the national monogram or seal of the Mujibnagar government and the current Bangladesh.
- Rakhal Chandra Saha, a prominent educationist and social worker. He was the first to introduce the education system in Savar, near Dhaka, the capital of Bangladesh.
- Rai Bahadur Ranada Prasad Saha, Bangladeshi businessman, philanthropist, and recipient of the Independence Day Award (posthumous)
- Shambhunath Saha, a leading figure in the anti-British independence movement of the Indian subcontinent and a revolutionary of the Age of Fire.

=== Others ===
- Manik Chandra Saha, a Bangladeshi journalist. He was awarded the Ekushey Padak, the second-highest civilian award of Bangladesh, in 2009 by the Government of Bangladesh.
- Munni Saha, a Bangladeshi journalist and television host.

== Families ==
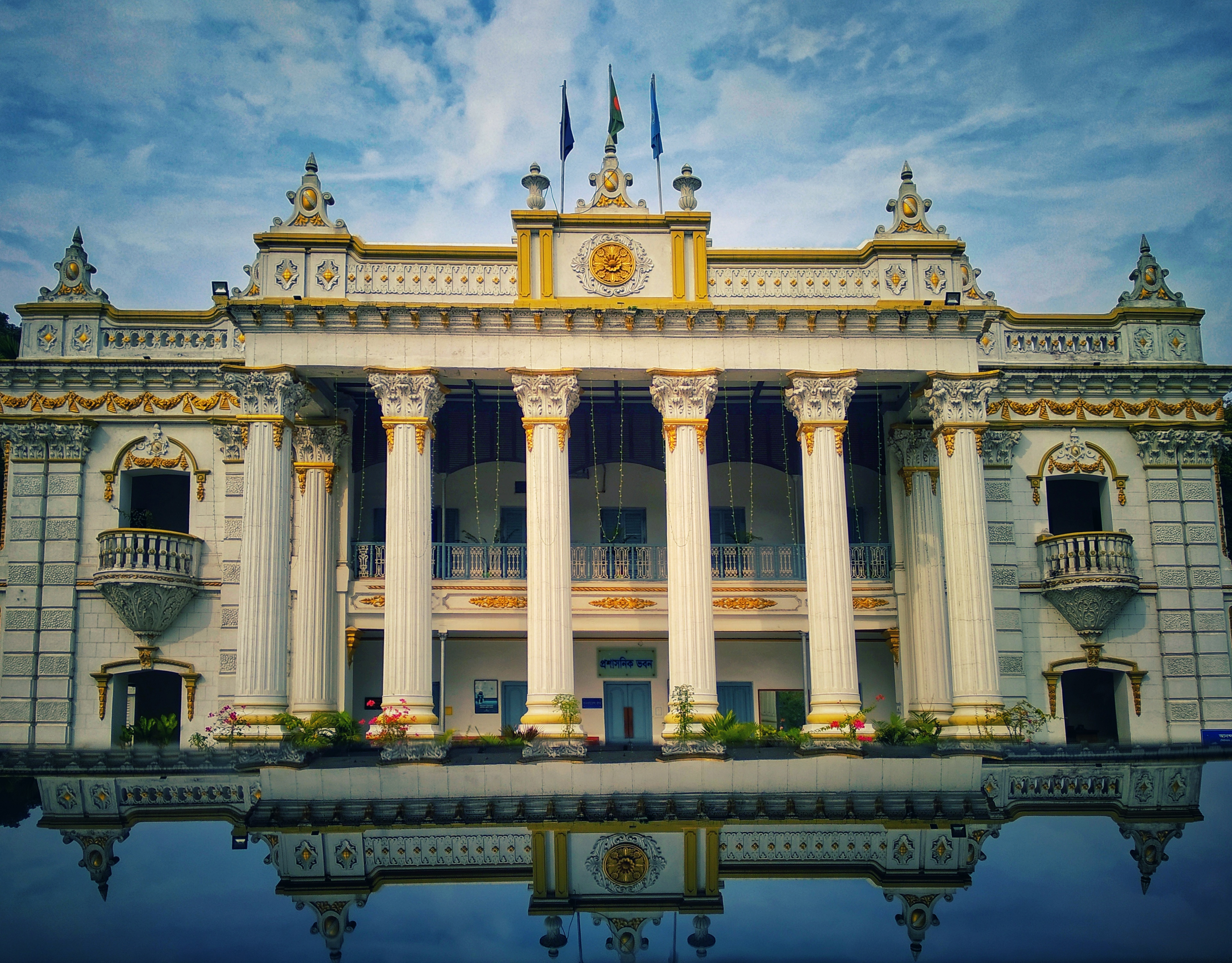
Mohera Jamidarbari

- Bhajahari Lodge, a protected early 20th-century mansion on Tipu Sultan Road, Dhaka, Bangladesh. It was built by Bhajahari Saha Banik around 1925.
- Saha zamindar bari in Danga
- Kumari Saha Zamindar's house, a historic landlord's house located in the village of Kumari, Alamdanga Upazila, Chuadanga District, Bangladesh.
- Mohera Zamindar Bari, a 19th-century Zamidari palace in Mirzapur, Tangail District, Bangladesh. The estate was established by a prominent zamindar family who settled in the area prior to the 1890s.
- R.N. Saha House, an archaeological site in Bangladesh. It is located beside the Ichamati River.
- Shankhanidhi House, A century-old building located on Tipu Sultan Road in Old Dhaka. This building is included in the list of 32 heritage buildings of the Department of Archaeology. Lalmohan Saha built Shankhanidhi House in 1921.

== Others ==
- R. P. Shaha University, a private university in Narayanganj, Bangladesh.
- Saha Institute of Nuclear Physics, an institution of basic research and training in physical and biophysical sciences located in Bidhannagar, Kolkata, India.
- Dr. Meghnad Saha College, which is located in Gaur town of North Dinajpur district. This college or university was established in 2000.
- Saha (crater), a lunar impact crater on the far side of the Moon.
- Saha ionization equation, relating the densities of atoms/ions/electrons in a plasma; also known as the Saha-Langmuir equation.
- Chittaranjan Saha Memorial Award, an award instituted in 2010 in the name of Chittaranjan Saha, a pioneer of the publishing industry in Bangladesh and the founder of the Amar Ekushey Book Fair.

== See also ==
- Shunri, Bengali vintner caste
- Saha for other uses
