= Bagepalli Ramachandrachar =

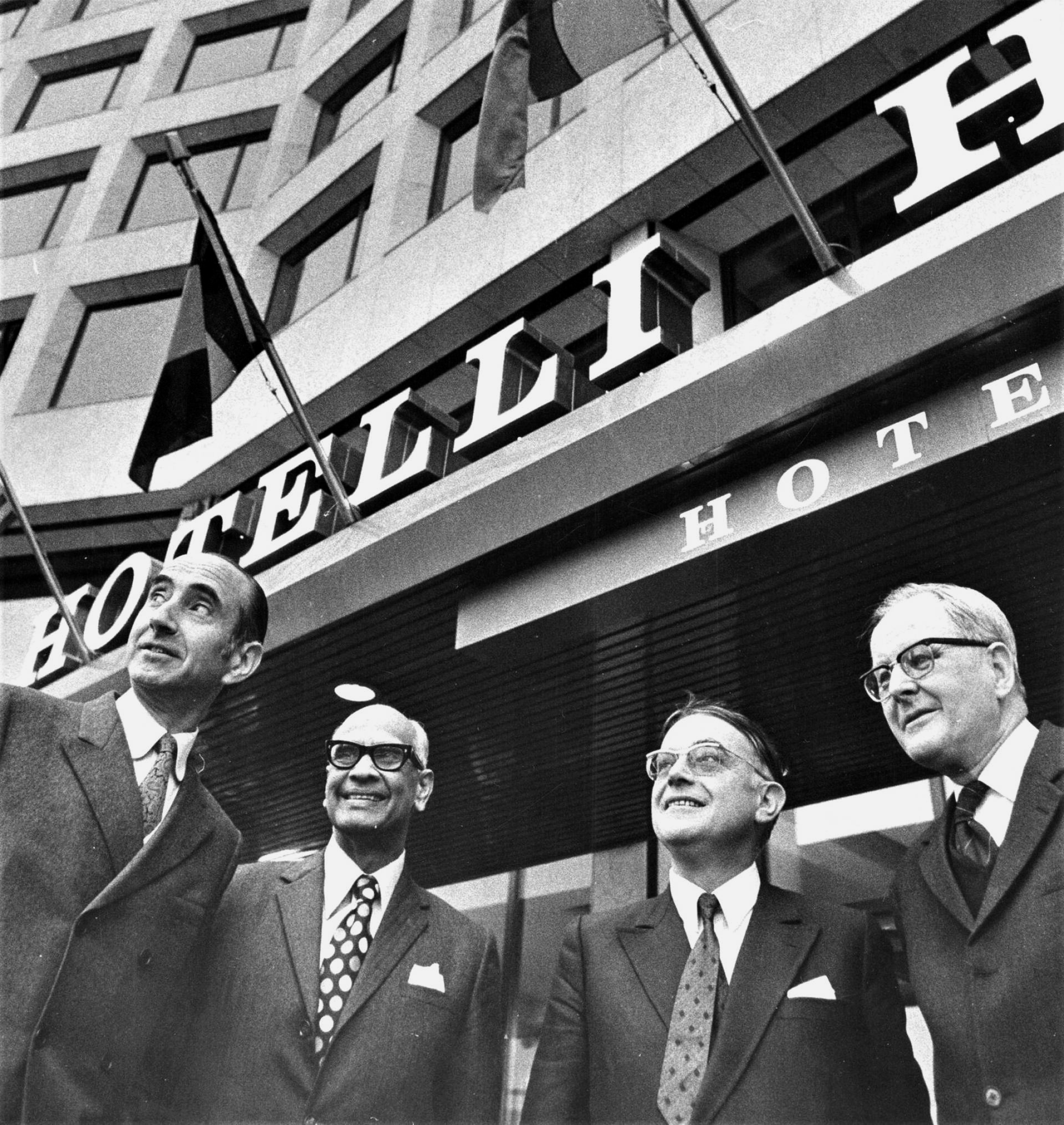
B. R. Seshachar (2nd from the left) with other scientists in Helsinki, Finland, 1972.

Bagepalli Ramachandrachar Seshachar (9 January 1908 – 25 January 1994) was a renowned zoologist and the President of Indian National Science Academy from 1971–72.

He joined the University of Mysore in 1926 as a demonstrator in Zoology and was a tenured professor until his retirement in 1960. Post-retirement, he was invited by V. K. R. Varadaraja Rao, the then vice-chancellor of Delhi University, to head the Zoology department where he served until 1971. Raorchestes charius and Gegeneophis seshachari are named after him and the etymology noted his pioneering studies concerning the cytogenetics, reproductive biology, and natural history of Indian caecilians.
