= Sundhi =

Indian caste

- Classification: SC in West Bengal; OBC in Bihar, Jharkhand and Odisha
- Religions: Hinduism

Sundhi also known as Sodhi or Sundi or Sudi or Sudhi or Shoundika, is an Indian caste whose traditional occupation has been brewing of alcoholic drinks. The Sundhis are included in the Other Backward Class category in the states of Bihar, Jharkhand and Odisha, though according to Suratha Kumar Malik, Sundhis of Koraput district of Odisha belong to the Dalit community, who are hooch traders and do small businesses. They are considered as Scheduled Caste in West Bengal, where they are also known as Shunri (except Saha).
