= Sudhir Saha =

Indian wrestler and coach (1918–1998)

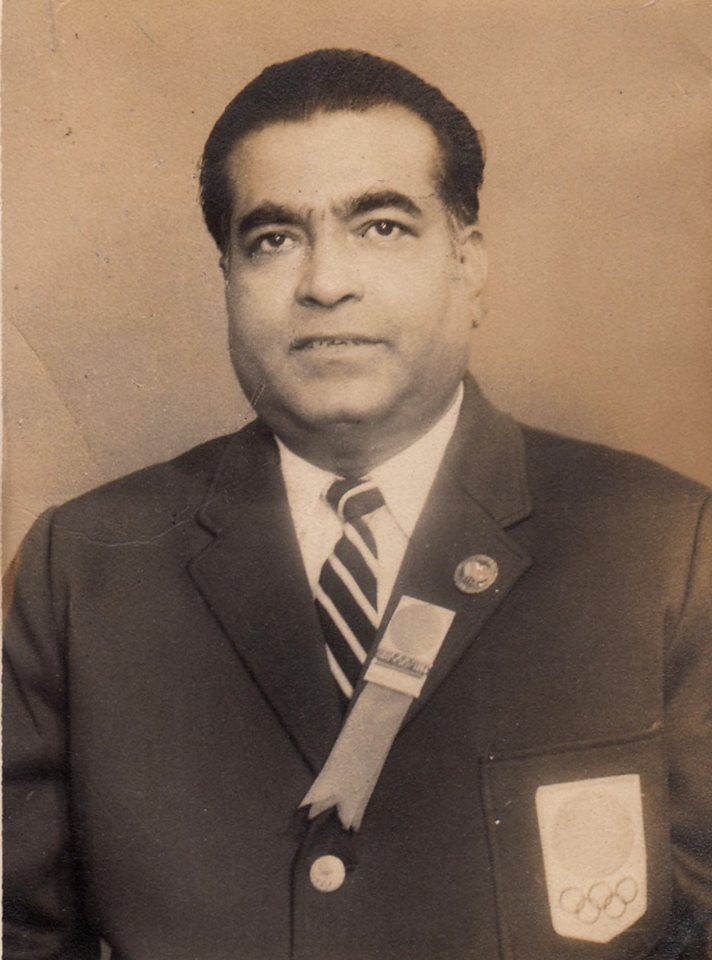
Sudhir Saha before leaving for the 1964 Olympic Games.

Sudhir Saha (1918–1998) was a wrestler, coach and wrestling administrator in India. He introduced Greco-Roman wrestling in India.

Sudhir Saha was the youngest son of Nandalal Saha and started wrestling at the age of six. Sudhir Saha was trained by his father, Nandalal Saha, and subsequently by Ustad (meaning 'expert' in Hindi, a title commonly given to coaches) Majid Palwan from Lahore. Sudhir won the West Bengal State Wrestling Championship from 1935 to 1944 in the freestyle wrestling category. In the 1940 Senior National Wrestling Championship, Sudhir placed first in the middleweight category. After his wrestling career, Sudhir devoted his time to coaching and judge/refereeing.

During his early coaching career, K.P. Rai and Nirmal Bose, from Panchanan Bayam Samity, one of India's oldest wrestling clubs, represented India in the 1948 London Olympics. Four years later, the 1952 Helsinki Olympic training camp was held at Panchanan Bayam Samity. Two of Sudhir's trainees, Nirmal Bose and Niranjan Das, from Panchanan Bayam Samity represented India in the 1952 Helsinki Olympics. One of Sudhir's trainees, K.D. Jadhav, won the bronze medal in the Bantamweight Category in the 1952 Helsinki Olympics. This was independent India's first individual Olympic medal.

In 1957, Sudhir Saha attended the first Fédération Internationale des Luttes Associées (FILA) Judge/Referee clinic for technical officials in Paris, with the aim of officials coming together to discuss theory and practicals on wrestling techniques and minute details of officiating. This is where he obtained his international judge/referee license. In 1961, Sudhir Saha completed his International Coaching degree from Japan. He was also the Joint Secretary and Vice President of Wrestling Federation of India; General Secretary, West Bengal Wrestling Federation; and he was responsible for technical positions such as Mat Chairman, Member of the Selection Committee, Chairman of the Greco-Roman Style in India, and the Judge/Referee Association of India. He started his refereeing career in 1953, supervising more than 1500 wrestling bouts. In the 1964 Summer Olympics held in Tokyo, Japan, Sudhir represented India as a wrestling judge/referee.

== Greco-Roman Style Wrestling in India ==
Under his supervision, the first Greco-Roman style wrestling competition was held in Calcutta at Panchanan Bayam Samity, one of India's oldest wrestling clubs. In 1965, at his initiative, the Greco-Roman wrestling style was introduced in the National Championship by the All India Wrestling Federation.

== Achievements ==
During Sudhir's coaching tenure, the following wrestlers received the following medals in International and World Championships, including 12 medals in the 1962 Asian Games (3 Gold, 6 Silver and 3 Bronze medals) and winning the team championship in the 1966 Commonwealth Games, with all seven Indian wrestlers winning medals (3 Gold, 2 Silver and 2 Bronze).

Below is a list of wrestlers and their achievements during Sudhir's coaching career.

| Year | Place | Name | Competition | Style | Weight | Rank |
|---|---|---|---|---|---|---|
| 1974 | Christchurch | Sudesh Kumar | Commonwealth Games | Freestyle | 52 | 1 |
| 1974 | Christchurch | Premnath | Commonwealth Games | Freestyle | 57 | 1 |
| 1974 | Christchurch | Jagrup | Commonwealth Games | Freestyle | 68 | 1 |
| 1974 | Christchurch | Raghunath Pawar | Commonwealth Games | Freestyle | 74 | 1 |
| 1970 | Bangkok | Chandagi Ram | Asian Games | Freestyle | 100 | 1 |
| 1970 | Edinburgh | Ved Prakash | Commonwealth Games | Freestyle | 48 | 1 |
| 1970 | Edinburgh | Sudesh Kumar | Commonwealth Games | Freestyle | 52 | 1 |
| 1970 | Edinburgh | Udey Chand | Commonwealth Games | Freestyle | 68 | 1 |
| 1970 | Edinburgh | Mukhtiar Singh | Commonwealth Games | Freestyle | 74 | 1 |
| 1970 | Edinburgh | Harish Chandra | Commonwealth Games | Freestyle | 82 | 1 |
| 1966 | Kingston | Bishmbar Singh | Commonwealth Games | Freestyle | 57 | 1 |
| 1966 | Kingston | Mukhtiar Singh | Commonwealth Games | Freestyle | 70 | 1 |
| 1966 | Kingston | Bishmbar Singh | Commonwealth Games | Freestyle | +97 | 1 |
| 1962 | Jakarta | Maruti Mane | Asian Games | Freestyle | 97 | 1 |
| 1962 | Jakarta | Malwa | Asian Games | Greco-Roman | 52 | 1 |
| 1962 | Jakarta | Ganpat Andalkar | Asian Games | Greco-Roman | +97 | 1 |
| 1974 | Christchurch | Shivaji Chingle | Commonwealth Games | Freestyle | 62 | 2 |
| 1974 | Christchurch | Satpal Singh | Commonwealth Games | Freestyle | 82 | 2 |
| 1974 | Christchurch | Netar Pal | Commonwealth Games | Freestyle | 90 | 2 |
| 1974 | Christchurch | Dadu Chogule | Commonwealth Games | Freestyle | 100 | 2 |
| 1974 | Christchurch | Viswanath Singh | Commonwealth Games | Freestyle | +100 | 2 |
| 1970 | Bangkok | Jit Singh | Asian Games | Freestyle | 90 | 2 |
| 1970 | Edinburgh | Sajjan singh | Commonwealth Games | Freestyle | 90 | 2 |
| 1970 | Edinburgh | Viswanath Singh | Commonwealth Games | Freestyle | 100 | 2 |
| 1970 | Edinburgh | Maruti Mane | Commonwealth Games | Freestyle | +100 | 2 |
| 1967 | New Delhi | Bishwambar Singh | World Championship | Freestyle | 57 | 2 |
| 1966 | Bangkok | Biswanath Singh | Asian Games | Freestyle | 97 | 2 |
| 1966 | Kingston | Shyamrao Sable | Commonwealth Games | Freestyle | 57 | 2 |
| 1966 | Kingston | Randhawa Singh | Commonwealth Games | Freestyle | 63 | 2 |
| 1962 | Jakarta | Udey Chand | Asian Games | Freestyle | 70 | 2 |
| 1962 | Jakarta | Sajjan Singh | Asian Games | Freestyle | 87 | 2 |
| 1962 | Jakarta | Ganpat Andalkar | Asian Games | Freestyle | +97 | 2 |
| 1962 | Jakarta | Udey Chand | Asian Games | Greco-Roman | 70 | 2 |
| 1962 | Jakarta | Sajjan Singh | Asian Games | Greco-Roman | 87 | 2 |
| 1962 | Jakarta | Maruti Mane | Asian Games | Greco-Roman | 97 | 2 |
| 1974 | Tehran | Satbir | Asian Games | Freestyle | 57 | 3 |
| 1974 | Tehran | Satpal Singh | Asian Games | Freestyle | 82 | 3 |
| 1974 | Tehran | Sukhchain | Asian Games | Freestyle | 100 | 3 |
| 1974 | Tehran | Sukhchain | Asian Games | Greco-Roman | 100 | 3 |
| 1974 | Christchurch | Radhey Shyam | Commonwealth Games | Freestyle | 48 | 3 |
| 1970 | Bangkok | Om Prakash | Asian Games | Freestyle | 68 | 3 |
| 1970 | Bangkok | Mukhtiar Singh | Asian Games | Freestyle | 74 | 3 |
| 1970 | Bangkok | Netar Pal | Asian Games | Freestyle | 82 | 3 |
| 1970 | Edinburgh | Randhawa Singh | Commonwealth Games | Freestyle | 62 | 3 |
| 1966 | Bangkok | Shamrao Sable | Asian Games | Freestyle | 52 | 3 |
| 1966 | Bangkok | Bishambar Singh | Asian Games | Freestyle | 57 | 3 |
| 1966 | Bangkok | V.Chad | Asian Games | Freestyle | 70 | 3 |
| 1966 | Bangkok | S.Singh | Asian Games | Freestyle | 87 | 3 |
| 1966 | Bangkok | Bhim Singh | Asian Games | Freestyle | +97 | 3 |
| 1966 | Kingston | Hukum Singh | Commonwealth Games | Freestyle | 78 | 3 |
| 1966 | Kingston | Bishwanath Singh | Commonwealth Games | Freestyle | 97 | 3 |
| 1962 | Jakarta | Malwa | Asian Games | Freestyle | 52 | 3 |
| 1962 | Jakarta | Lakshmi Chand Gandey | Asian Games | Freestyle | 78 | 3 |
| 1962 | Jakarta | Narin Ghume | Asian Games | Greco-Roman | 57 | 3 |
| 1961 | Yokohama | Udey Chand | World Championship | Freestyle | 67 | 3 |
| 1972 | Munich | Sudesh Kumar | Olympic Games | Freestyle | 52 | 4 |
| 1972 | Munich | Premnath | Olympic Games | Freestyle | 57 | 4 |
| 1965 | Manchester | Bishamber Singh | World Championship | Freestyle | 57 | 4 |

During Sudhir's coaching career, wrestlers and officials from Panchanan Bayam Samity represented the State of West Bengal and India in International Championships.

Some Wrestlers and Officials are listed below -

| Name | Achievements |
|---|---|
| Nirmal Bose | 1948 and 1952 Olympics |
| K.P. Rai | 1948 Olympics |
| Niranjan Das | 1952 Olympics |
| Shyam Sundar Chaterjee | 1953 World Youth festival Games/ Gold- Indo/Japan Games 1953 |
| Yogeswar Singh | 1954 Asian Games - 5th |
| Robin Hazra | Gold - Indo -Ceylon meet - 1958 |
| Tarkeswar Pandey | 1956 Olympics |
| Dhanraj Misra | National Champion - 1950 |
| Hiralal Shaw | National Champion - 1953 |
| Sachidanandan Singh | National Champion - 1970 |
| Gupteshwar Misra | International Judge/Referee |
| Asit Kumar Saha | International Judge/Referee |

As a coach, judge and referee, Sudhir represented India at different International Championships. Below are some of Sudhir's achievements -

| Year | Championship |
|---|---|
| 1961 | World Wrestling Championship, Yokohama, Japan |
| 1963 | India-USSR Meet, Moscow, USSR |
| 1964 | Olympic Games, Tokyo, Japan |
| 1966 | Commonwealth Games, Kingston, Jamaica |
| 1966 | India-Mexico Meet, Mexico City, Mexico |
| 1966 | India-England Meet, London, England |
| 1967 | World Wrestling Championship, Delhi, India |
| 1971 | Junior World Wrestling Championship, Tokyo, Japan |

== Mithun Chakraborty ==
Actor, Mithun Chakraborty, learnt the art of wrestling under the supervision of Sudhir Saha at Panchanan Bayam Samity, Jorabagan Park, Kolkata.
