= Kailashahar Assembly constituency =

Legislative Assembly constituency in Tripura State, India

Coordinates: 24.32°N 92.01°E

Kailashahar
- Constituency No. 53 for the Tripura Legislative Assembly

Constituency details
- Country: India
- Region: Northeast India
- State: Tripura
- District: Unakoti
- Lok Sabha constituency: Tripura East
- Established: 1967
- Total electors: 51,000
- Reservation: None

Member of Legislative Assembly
- 13th Tripura Legislative Assembly
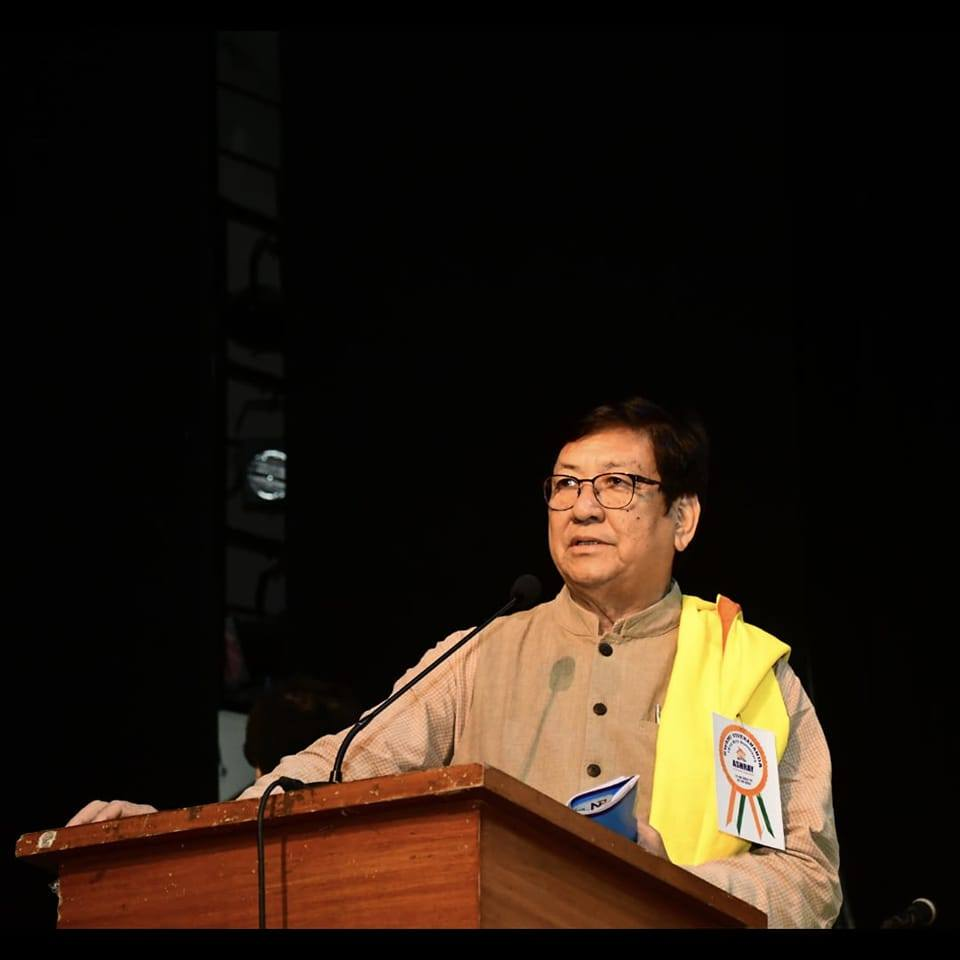
- Incumbent Birajit Sinha
- Party: Indian National Congress
- Elected year: 2023

Kailashahar Legislative Assembly constituency is one of the 60 Legislative Assembly constituencies of Tripura state in India.

It is part of Unakoti district. As of 2023, it is represented by Birajit Sinha of the Indian National Congress party.

== Members of the Legislative Assembly ==
| Election | Member | Party |
|---|---|---|
| 1967 | M. L. Bhowmik | Indian National Congress |
| 1972 | Moulana Abdul Ratif | Indian National Congress |
| 1977 | Tapan Chakraborty | Communist Party of India |
| 1983 | Syed Basit Ali | Indian National Congress |
| 1988 | Birajit Sinha | Indian National Congress |
| 1993 | Tapan Chakraborty | Communist Party of India |
| 1998 | Birajit Sinha | Indian National Congress |
| 2003 | Birajit Sinha | Indian National Congress |
| 2008 | Birajit Sinha | Indian National Congress |
| 2013 | Birajit Sinha | Indian National Congress |
| 2018 | Moboshar Ali | Communist Party of India |
| 2023 | Birajit Sinha | Indian National Congress |

== Election results ==
=== 2023 Assembly election ===
2023 Tripura Legislative Assembly election: Kailashahar
| Party | Candidate | Votes | % | ±% |
|---|---|---|---|---|
| INC | Birajit Sinha | 25,300 | 59.62 | ▲40.25 |
| BJP | Moboshar Ali | 15,614 | 36.80 | ▲3.81 |
| AITC | Md. Abdul Matin | 696 | 1.64 | ▲1.10 |
| NOTA | None of the Above | 537 | 1.27 | ▲0.20 |
| Margin of victory | | 9,686 | 22.83 | ▲10.80 |
| Turnout | | 42,433 | 83.28 | ▼4.01 |
| Registered electors | | 51,000 | | ▲10.67 |
| INC gain from CPI(M) | | Swing | ▲14.61 | |

=== 2018 Assembly election ===
2018 Tripura Legislative Assembly election: Kailashahar
| Party | Candidate | Votes | % | ±% |
|---|---|---|---|---|
| CPI(M) | Moboshar Ali | 18,093 | 45.02 | ▼3.26 |
| BJP | Nitish De | 13,259 | 32.99 | ▲31.91 |
| INC | Birajit Sinha | 7,787 | 19.37 | ▼30.18 |
| NOTA | None of the Above | 430 | 1.07 | New |
| AITC | Narasingha Das | 218 | 0.54 | New |
| Margin of victory | | 4,834 | 12.03 | ▲10.75 |
| Turnout | | 40,192 | 86.39 | ▼3.99 |
| Registered electors | | 46,083 | | ▲10.45 |
| CPI(M) gain from INC | | Swing | ▼4.54 | |

=== 2013 Assembly election ===
2013 Tripura Legislative Assembly election: Kailashahar
| Party | Candidate | Votes | % | ±% |
|---|---|---|---|---|
| INC | Birajit Sinha | 18,857 | 49.55 | ▼0.30 |
| CPI(M) | Moboshar Ali | 18,372 | 48.28 | ▲1.15 |
| BJP | Durga Charan Deb | 412 | 1.08 | ▼0.22 |
| Independent | Md Taybur Rahman | 251 | 0.66 | New |
| Margin of victory | | 485 | 1.27 | ▼1.45 |
| Turnout | | 38,054 | 91.27 | ▼0.51 |
| Registered electors | | 41,722 | | |
| INC hold | | Swing | ▼0.30 | |

=== 2008 Assembly election ===
2008 Tripura Legislative Assembly election: Kailashahar
| Party | Candidate | Votes | % | ±% |
|---|---|---|---|---|
| INC | Birajit Sinha | 17,019 | 49.86 | ▼2.64 |
| CPI(M) | Jayanta Chakraborty | 16,088 | 47.13 | ▲1.75 |
| BJP | Santosh Debroy | 446 | 1.31 | New |
| Independent | Samsar Ali | 343 | 1.00 | New |
| Margin of victory | | 931 | 2.73 | ▼4.39 |
| Turnout | | 34,136 | 91.83 | ▲11.27 |
| Registered electors | | 37,219 | | |
| INC hold | | Swing | ▼2.64 | |

=== 2003 Assembly election ===
2003 Tripura Legislative Assembly election: Kailashahar
| Party | Candidate | Votes | % | ±% |
|---|---|---|---|---|
| INC | Birajit Sinha | 14,751 | 52.50 | ▲3.38 |
| CPI(M) | Inuch Mia Khadim | 12,750 | 45.38 | ▲0.34 |
| AITC | Bijoy Bhattacharjee | 184 | 0.65 | New |
| Margin of victory | | 2,001 | 7.12 | ▲3.04 |
| Turnout | | 28,099 | 80.57 | ▼0.93 |
| Registered electors | | 34,930 | | ▲12.97 |
| INC hold | | Swing | | |

=== 1998 Assembly election ===
1998 Tripura Legislative Assembly election: Kailashahar
| Party | Candidate | Votes | % | ±% |
|---|---|---|---|---|
| INC | Birajit Sinha | 12,360 | 49.12 | ▲2.09 |
| CPI(M) | Tapan Chakraborty | 11,333 | 45.04 | ▼3.96 |
| BJP | Bidhan Das | 1,442 | 5.73 | ▲2.59 |
| Margin of victory | | 1,027 | 4.08 | ▲2.11 |
| Turnout | | 25,163 | 82.63 | ▼1.10 |
| Registered electors | | 30,921 | | ▲7.80 |
| INC gain from CPI(M) | | Swing | | |

=== 1993 Assembly election ===
1993 Tripura Legislative Assembly election: Kailashahar
| Party | Candidate | Votes | % | ±% |
|---|---|---|---|---|
| CPI(M) | Tapan Chakraborty | 11,592 | 49.00 | ▲2.06 |
| INC | Birajit Sinha | 11,126 | 47.03 | ▼3.86 |
| BJP | Bidhan Das | 742 | 3.14 | ▲1.70 |
| Margin of victory | | 466 | 1.97 | ▼1.98 |
| Turnout | | 23,659 | 83.61 | ▼4.32 |
| Registered electors | | 28,684 | | ▲33.10 |
| CPI(M) gain from INC | | Swing | | |

=== 1988 Assembly election ===
1988 Tripura Legislative Assembly election: Kailashahar
| Party | Candidate | Votes | % | ±% |
|---|---|---|---|---|
| INC | Birajit Sinha | 9,519 | 50.88 | ▲0.06 |
| CPI(M) | Tapan Chakraborty | 8,780 | 46.93 | ▲0.05 |
| BJP | Bidhan Das | 268 | 1.43 | New |
| Margin of victory | | 739 | 3.95 | ▲0.01 |
| Turnout | | 18,707 | 87.72 | ▲4.11 |
| Registered electors | | 21,551 | | ▲11.59 |
| INC hold | | Swing | | |

=== 1983 Assembly election ===
1983 Tripura Legislative Assembly election: Kailashahar
| Party | Candidate | Votes | % | ±% |
|---|---|---|---|---|
| INC | Syed Basit Ali | 8,116 | 50.82 | ▲21.15 |
| CPI(M) | Tapan Chakraborty | 7,487 | 46.88 | ▼6.48 |
| Independent | Rabindra Kumar Das | 196 | 1.23 | New |
| Independent | Kanai Lal Datta | 102 | 0.64 | New |
| Margin of victory | | 629 | 3.94 | ▼19.75 |
| Turnout | | 15,970 | 83.90 | ▲5.17 |
| Registered electors | | 19,313 | | ▲12.34 |
| INC gain from CPI(M) | | Swing | ▼2.54 | |

=== 1977 Assembly election ===
1977 Tripura Legislative Assembly election: Kailashahar
| Party | Candidate | Votes | % | ±% |
|---|---|---|---|---|
| CPI(M) | Tapan Chakraborty | 7,111 | 53.36 | New |
| INC | Abdul Shahid | 3,954 | 29.67 | ▼25.76 |
| JP | Moulana Abdul Ratif | 2,074 | 15.56 | New |
| TPCC | Debabrata Sinha Roy | 187 | 1.40 | New |
| Margin of victory | | 3,157 | 23.69 | ▼9.56 |
| Turnout | | 13,326 | 78.54 | ▲8.63 |
| Registered electors | | 17,191 | | ▲52.69 |
| CPI(M) gain from INC | | Swing | ▼2.07 | |

=== 1972 Assembly election ===
1972 Tripura Legislative Assembly election: Kailashahar
| Party | Candidate | Votes | % | ±% |
|---|---|---|---|---|
| INC | Moulana Abdul Ratif | 4,299 | 55.43 | ▲4.34 |
| Independent | Bonode Dey | 1,720 | 22.18 | New |
| Independent | Ajoy Chakraborty | 1,448 | 18.67 | New |
| Independent | Dwijendra Chandramalakar | 289 | 3.73 | New |
| Margin of victory | | 2,579 | 33.25 | ▲31.07 |
| Turnout | | 7,756 | 70.73 | ▼11.09 |
| Registered electors | | 11,259 | | ▼43.83 |
| INC hold | | Swing | ▲4.34 | |

=== 1967 Assembly election ===
1967 Tripura Legislative Assembly election: Kailashahar
| Party | Candidate | Votes | % | ±% |
|---|---|---|---|---|
| INC | M. L. Bhowmik | 8,190 | 51.09 | New |
| CPI(M) | B. Majumder | 7,841 | 48.91 | New |
| Margin of victory | | 349 | 2.18 | |
| Turnout | | 16,031 | 81.63 | |
| Registered electors | | 20,045 | | |
| INC win (new seat) | | | | |

== See also ==
- List of constituencies of the Tripura Legislative Assembly
- Unakoti district
