= Indian National Science Academy =

National academy in New Delhi

- Established: 7 January 1935; 91 years ago
- Founder: Lewis Leigh Fermor
- Location: Bahadur Shah Zafar Marg, New Delhi, India
- Coordinates: 28°37′44″N 77°14′27″E
- President: Shekhar C. Mande
- Website: www.insaindia.res.in

The Indian National Science Academy (INSA) is a national academy in New Delhi for Indian scientists in all branches of science and technology.

In 2015, INSA constituted a junior wing for young scientists in the country named Indian National Young Academy of Sciences (INYAS) in line with other national young academies. INYAS is the academy for young scientists in India as a national young academy and is affiliated with Global Young Academy. INYAS is also a signatory of the declaration on the Core Values of Young Academies, adopted at the World Science Forum, Budapest, on 20 November 2019. Prof.Shekhar C. Mande is the serving president (2026-present).

== History ==
The origins of INSA can be traced back to the founding of the National Institute of Sciences in India (NISI) in the year 1935 in Calcutta (now Kolkata). The basic objective was, and continues to be, to promote, nurture and safeguard the interests of science and scientists. The NISI was recognised by the Government of India as a Premier National Scientific Society. NISI moved to its present premises in Delhi in 1951. A Government of India decision in 1968 mandated INSA to represent India in all the international science fora. In 1970, NISI was given a new name- Indian National Science Academy (INSA). Its campus at Bahadur Shah Zafar Marg came into being in 1951, with a major expansion during the late 80's-mid 90's. Today the main INSA building stands out at Bahadur Shah Zafar Marg as a seven-storied, beautifully shaped Golden Jubilee Building, completed in 1996.

== Overview ==
The Academy consists of Foundation fellows, Fellows (FNA) and Foreign Fellows. Election to the Academy is only by nomination. The objectives of the academy encompass promotion of science in India including its application to national welfare, safeguarding the interests of the scientists, establishing linkages with international bodies to foster collaboration and expressing considered opinion on national issues.

It plays a role in promoting, recognising and rewarding excellence in scientific research. With a view to promoting the pursuit of excellence in the field of 'Science and Technology', the academy has instituted 59 awards, placed in 4 categories, viz International Awards, General Medal & Lecture Awards, Subjectwise Medals/Lectures and Awards for Young Scientists. It also publishes journals, organises scientific discussions and brings out proceedings and monographs.

It is a signatory to the Berlin Declaration on Open Access to Knowledge in the Sciences and Humanities in 2004.

== Presidents ==
The list of presidents of the society.

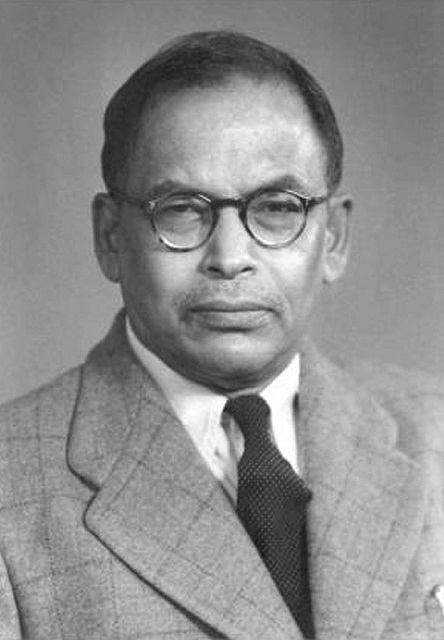
Meghnad Saha

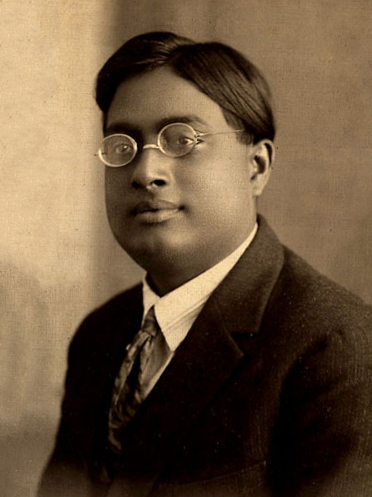
Satyendra Nath Bose

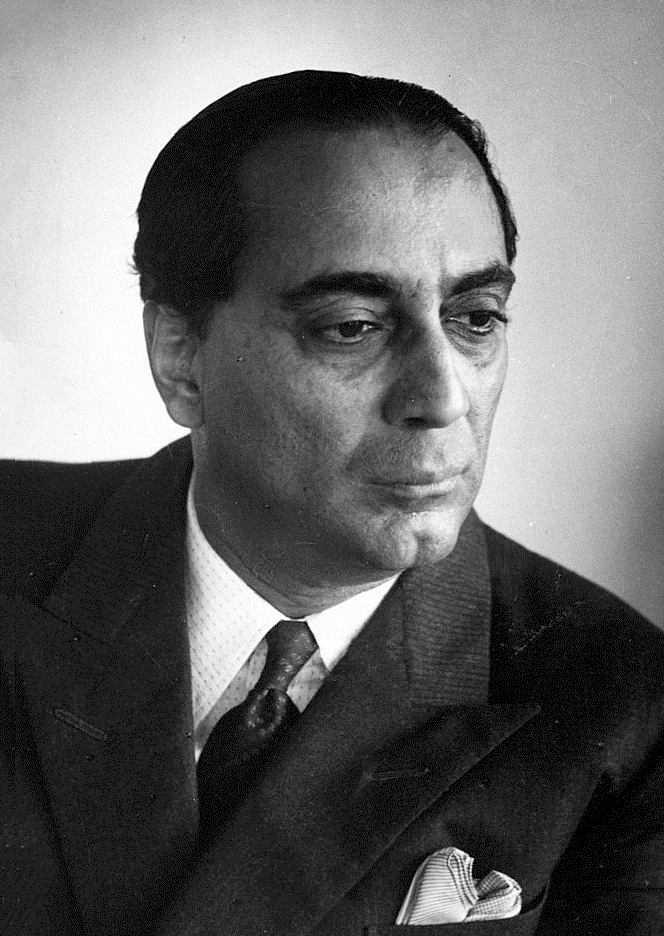
Homi J. Bhabha

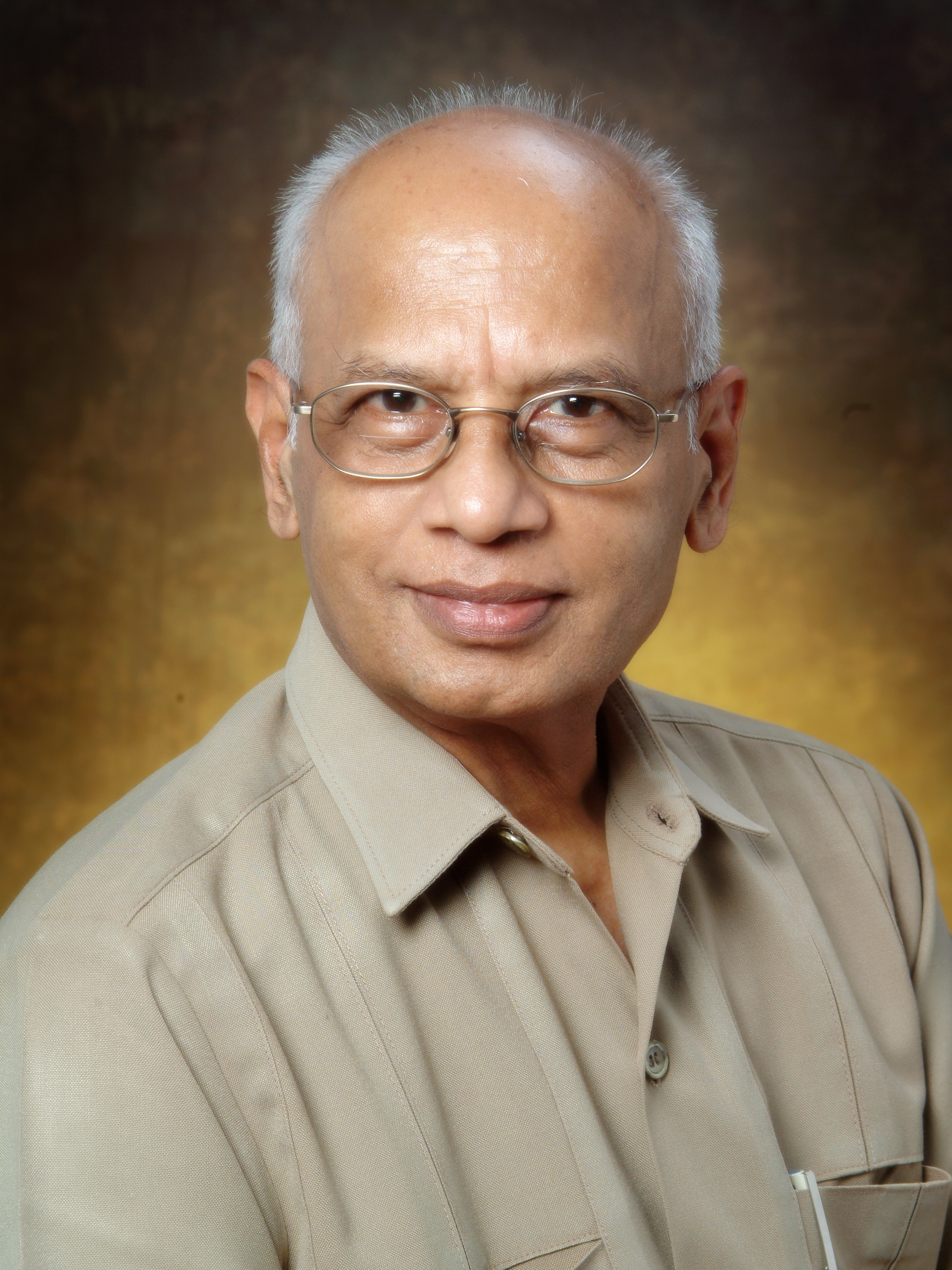
M. S. Valiathan

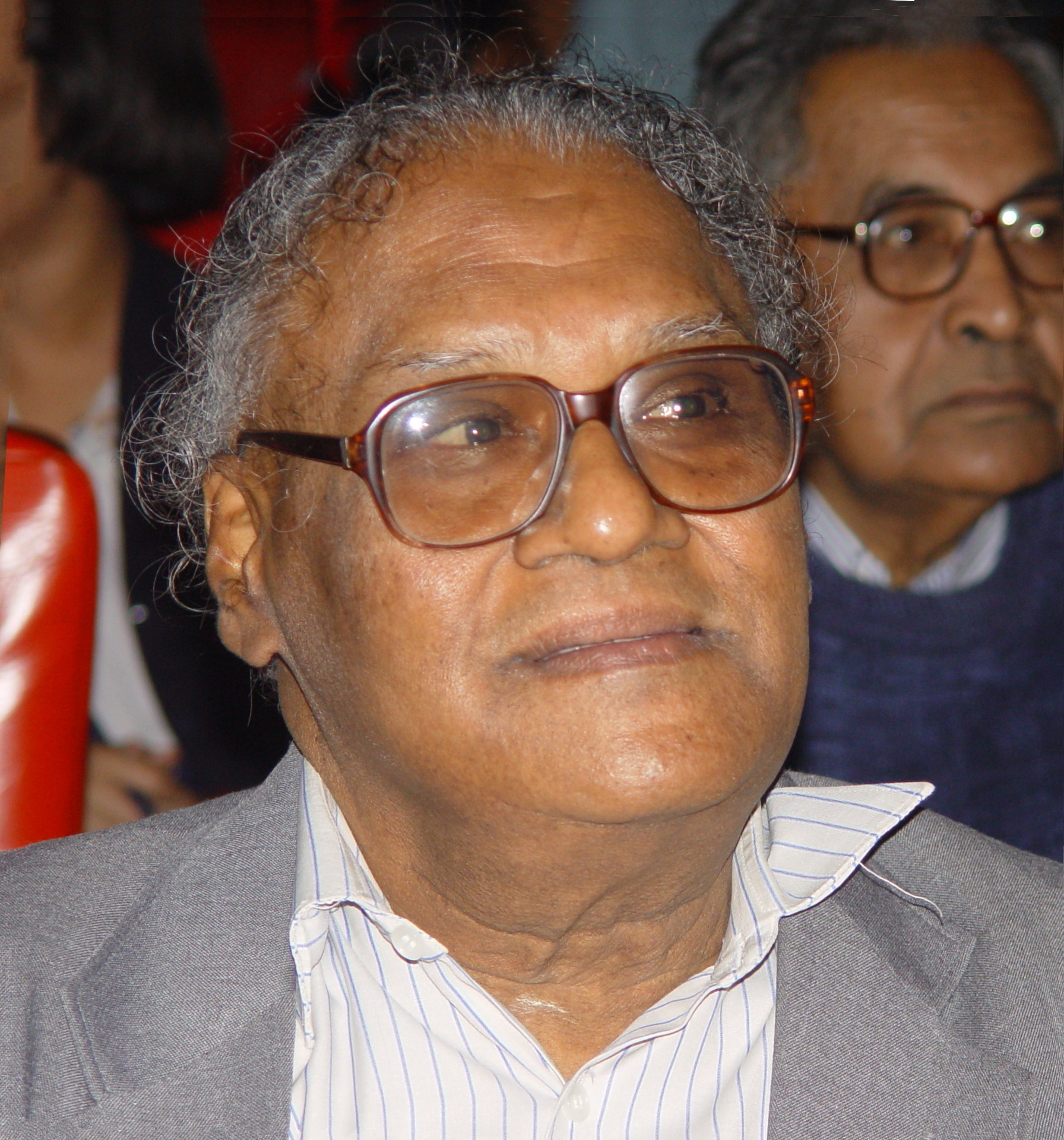
C. N. R. Rao

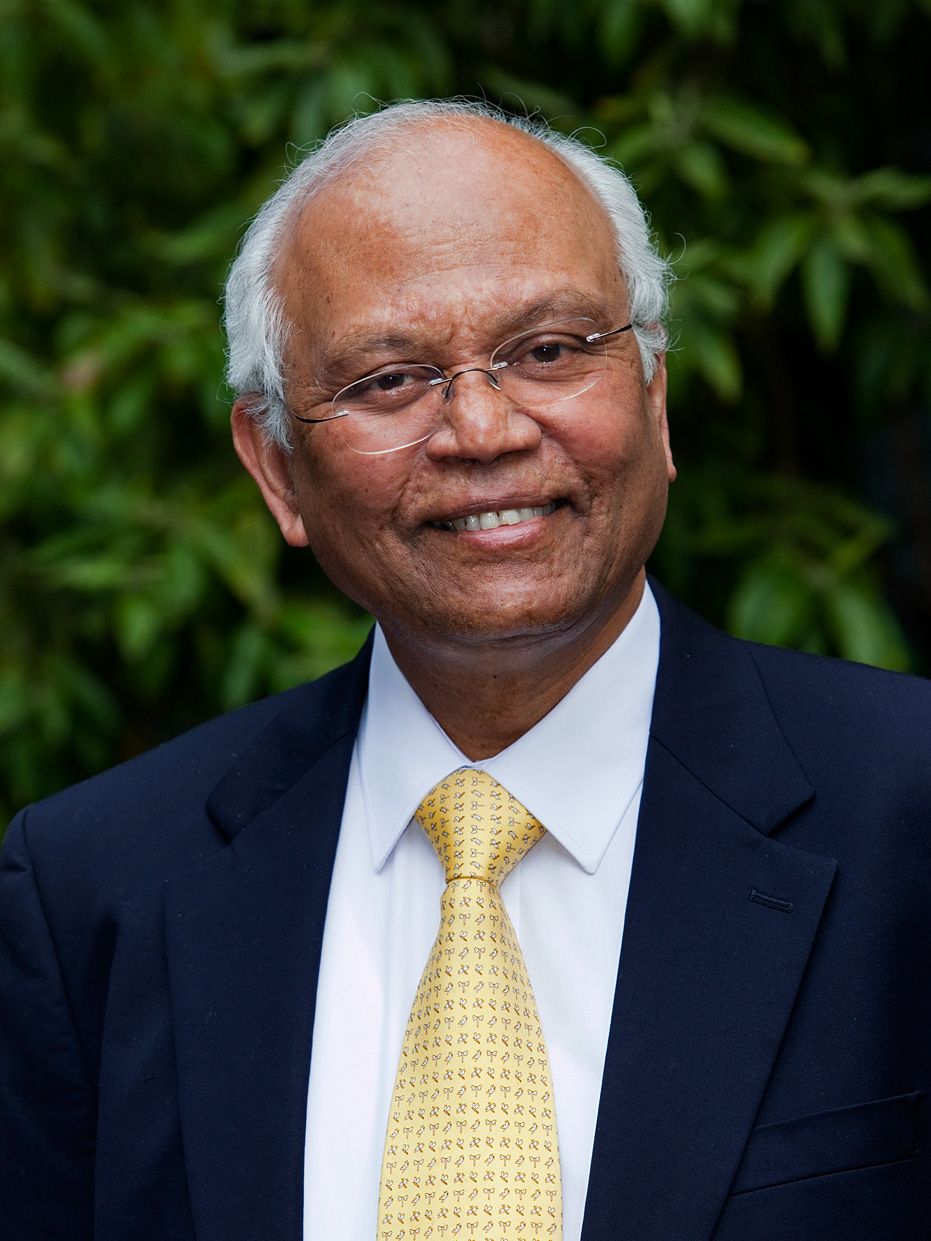
Raghunath Anant Mashelkar

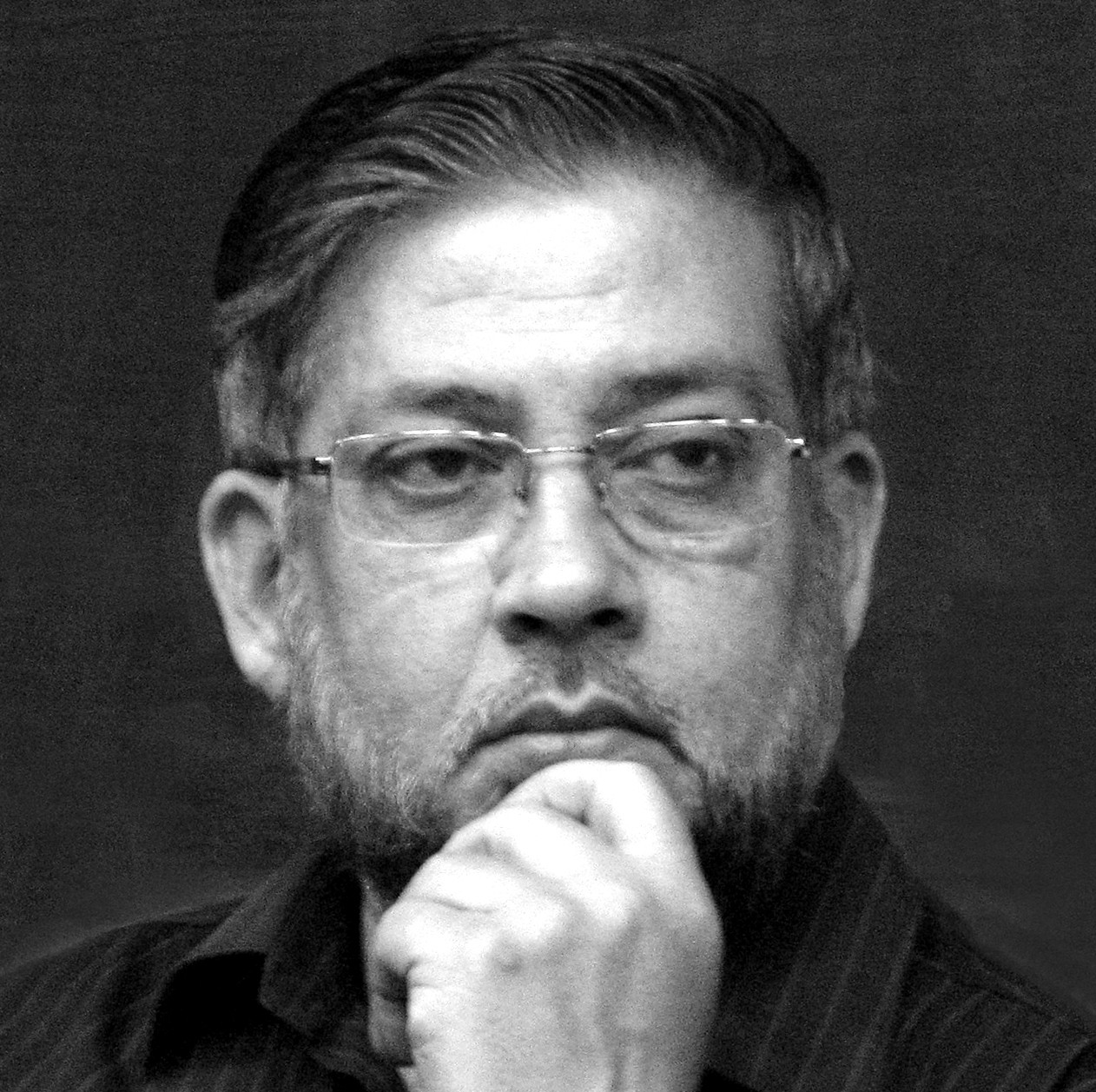
Raghavendra Gadagkar

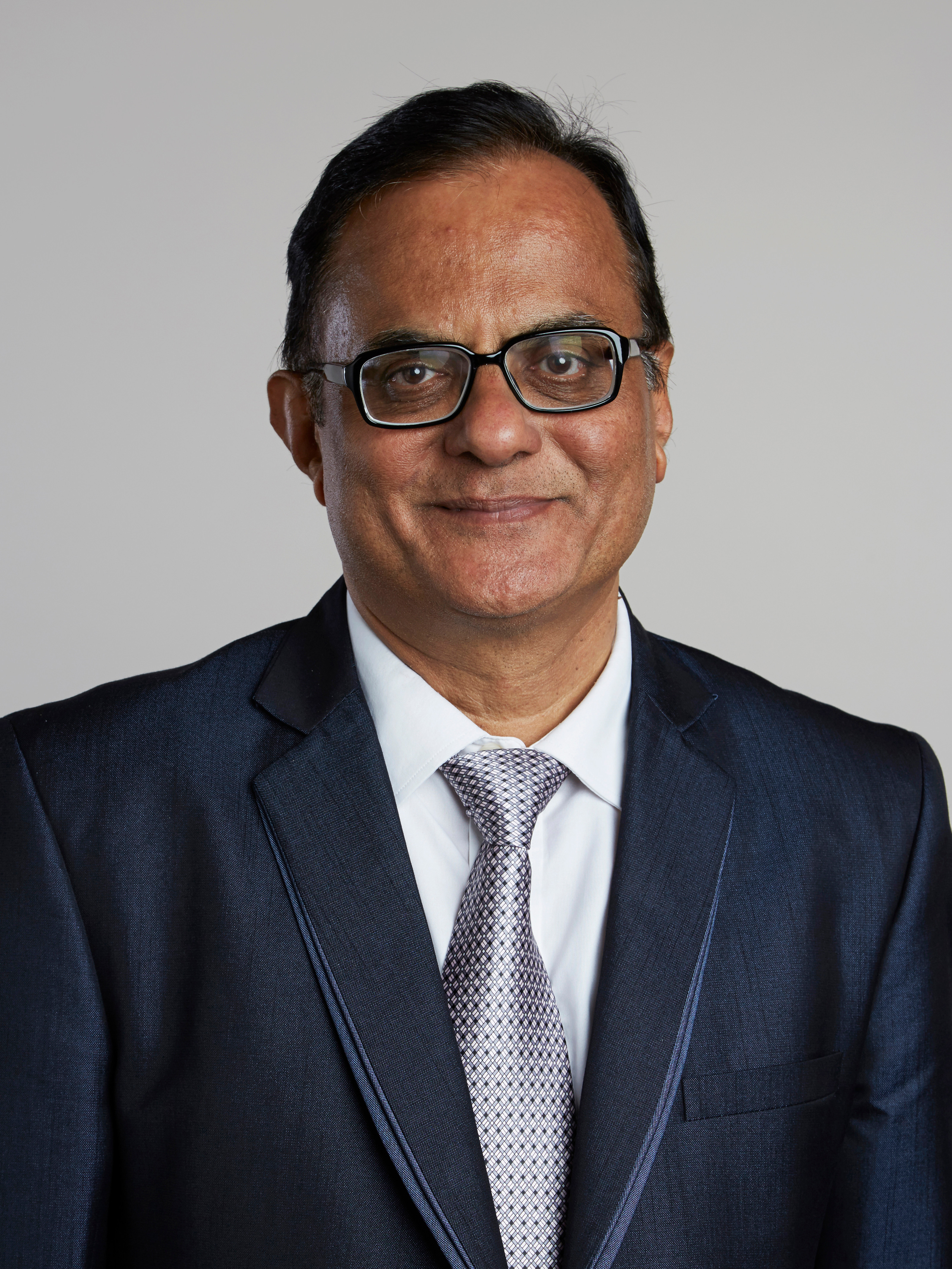
Ajay K. Sood

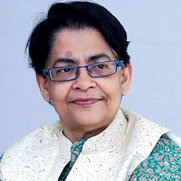
Chandrima Shaha

President	From	To
Lewis Leigh Fermor	1935	1936
Meghnad Saha	1937	1938
Ram Nath Chopra	1939	1940
Baini Prashad	1941	1942
Jnan Chandra Ghosh	1943	1944
Darashaw Nosherwan Wadia	1945	1946
Shanti Swaroop Bhatnagar	1947	1948
Satyendra Nath Bose	1949	1950
Sunder Lal Hora	1951	1952
Kariamanickam Srinivasa Krishnan	1953	1954
Amulya Chandra Ukil	1955	1956
Prasanta Chandra Mahalanobis	1957	1958
Sisir Kumar Mitra	1959	1960
Ajudhiya Nath Khosla	1961	1962
Homi Jehangir Bhabha	1963	1964
Vasant Ramji Khanolkar	1965	1966
Thiruvengadam Rajendram Seshadri	1967	1968
Atma Ram	1969	1970
Bagepalli Ramachandrachar Seshachar	1971	1972
Daulat Singh Kothari	1973	1974
Benjamin Peary Pal	1975	1976
Raja Ramanna	1977	1978
Vulimiri Ramalingaswami	1979	1980
Mambillikalathil Govind Kumar Menon	1981	1982
Arun Kumar Sharma	1983	1984
Chintamani Nagesa Ramachandra Rao	1985	1986
Autar Singh Paintal	1987	1988
Man Mohan Sharma	1989	1990
Prakash Narain Tandon	1991	1992
Shri Krishna Joshi	1993	1995
Srinivasan Varadarajan	1996	1998
Goverdhan Mehta	1999	2001
Marthanda Varma Sankaran Valiathan	2002	2004
Raghunath Anant Mashelkar	2005	2007
Mamannamana Vijayan	2008	2010
Krishan Lal	2011	2013
Raghavendra Gadagkar	2014	2016
Ajay K. Sood	2017	2019
Chandrima Shaha	2020	2022
Ashutosh Sharma	2023	2025
Shekhar C. Mande	2026	Incumbent

== Publications ==
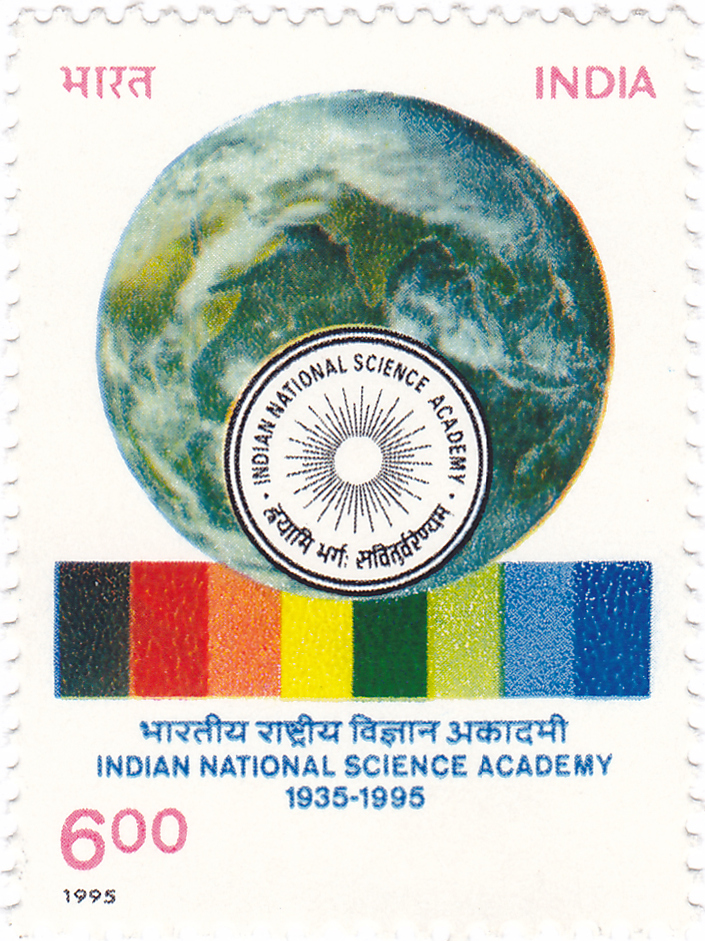
Indian National Science Academy 1995 stamp of India

The academy publishes three peer-reviewed journals

- Proceedings of the Indian National Science Academy (formerly Proceedings of the National Institute of Sciences of India)
- Indian Journal of Pure and Applied Mathematics
- Indian Journal of History of Science

It also publishes a yearbook, annual reports, INSA News, biographical memoirs, special publications and the proceedings of INSA seminars and symposia.

== See also ==
- Indian Academy of Sciences
- Indian National Academy of Engineering
- National Academy of Sciences, India
