= Shekhar C. Mande =

Indian biologist (born 1962)

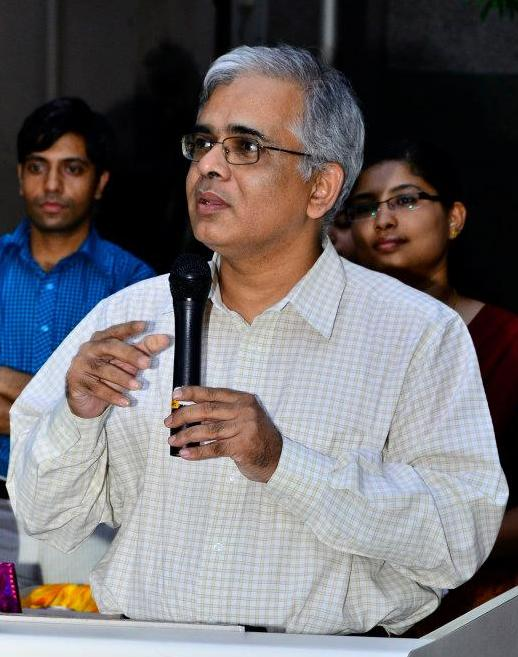
- Born: 5 April 1962 (age 64); Pune, India
- Education: University of Nagpur; Indian Institute of Science; Rijksuniversiteit Groningen
- Children: Nikhil S. Mande
- Scientific career
- Fields: Biology
- Workplaces: National Centre for Cell Science
- Website: CSIR Profile

Shekhar C. Mande (born 5 April 1962) is Structural and Computational Biologist. He was the Director General of the Council of Scientific and Industrial Research (CSIR), India, and the Secretary of the Department of Scientific and Industrial Research (DSIR), Ministry of Science and Technology. Prior to this, he was the Director of National Centre for Cell Science, Pune.

He was awarded in 2005 the Shanti Swarup Bhatnagar Prize for Science and Technology, the highest science award in India, in the Biological sciences category.

== Early life and education ==
Mande completed his M.Sc. in Physics from University of Nagpur in 1984. In 1991, he earned his PhD in Molecular Biophysics, from the Indian Institute of Science, Bangalore working under the supervision of M. Vijayan. Following his PhD, he joined Wim G. J. Hol as Postdoctoral researcher at Rijksuniversiteit Groningen in the Netherlands.

== Career ==
Mande began his career at Dec 1995 at the Institute of Microbial Technology in Chandigarh. In September 2001, he moved to Centre for DNA Fingerprinting and Diagnostics in Hyderabad as a senior staff scientist. Between September 2011 and September 2018 He served as director at National Centre for Cell Science in Pune, India.

He has served on many national and international committees including the scientific advisory committee of the International Centre for Genetic Engineering and Biotechnology, Trieste, Italy; Management Council of the Tata Institute of Fundamental Research (TIFR), Mumbai, Member of the Council of Indian Institute of Science, Bangalore; member of the Management Councils of the Solapur University and the Savitribai Phule Pune University; member of the Governing Body of the Indo-French Centre for Promotion of Advanced Research (CEFIPRA), etc. Currently he chairs the Governing Board of the National Council of Science Museums. He is also the National President of Vijnana Bharati, a large voluntary science movement in India with Swadeshi spirit.

Prior to moving to Delhi in October 2018 to handle Ministry of Science and Technology portfolios, Mande served on many advisory committees in Government Departments.

Until December 2019, he served as the chair the National Committee for the International Union of Crystallography for the Indian National Science Academy, New Delhi. He is serving as President of Indian National Science Academy from 2026 onwards.

== Research highlights ==
- Structural Biologist and X-ray Crystallographer
- Structural characterization of Mycobacterium tuberculosis proteins
- Computational analysis of genome-wide protein:protein interactions.

== Prizes and honours ==
- B M Birla Young Scientist Award (1999)
- Wellcome Trust International Senior Fellow, 2003–08
- Shanti Swarup Bhatnagar Prize for Science and Technology (2005)
- Fellow, Indian National Science Academy New Delhi, Elected 2010
- Fellow, National Academy of Sciences, Allahabad, India, Elected 2003
- Fellow, Indian Academy of Sciences, Bangalore, Elected 2003
- BC Guha Memorial Lecture of the Indian National Science Academy, 2017
- BK Bachhawat Memorial Lecture of the National Academy of Science, India, 2017
- Bharat Asmita Award of MIT-World Peace University, Pune (2019)
- HK Firodia Vijnan Bhushan Award (2020)
- Aryabhatta Medal of the Indian National Science Academy, 2021
