= Baishya Kapali =

Bengali Hindu agricultural caste

Baishya Kapali (Bengali: বৈশ্য কাপালি) is a Bengali Hindu agricultural caste found in the Indian state of West Bengal and in Bangladesh. From the 1960s, a section of the Kapali caste embraced 'Baishya Kapali' as their caste name, which remains a matter of dispute to date. The Kapalis have excelled in cultivating jute and the manufacture of ropes and gunny bags. Baishya Kapalis or Kapalis are listed as Other Backward Classes in West Bengal.

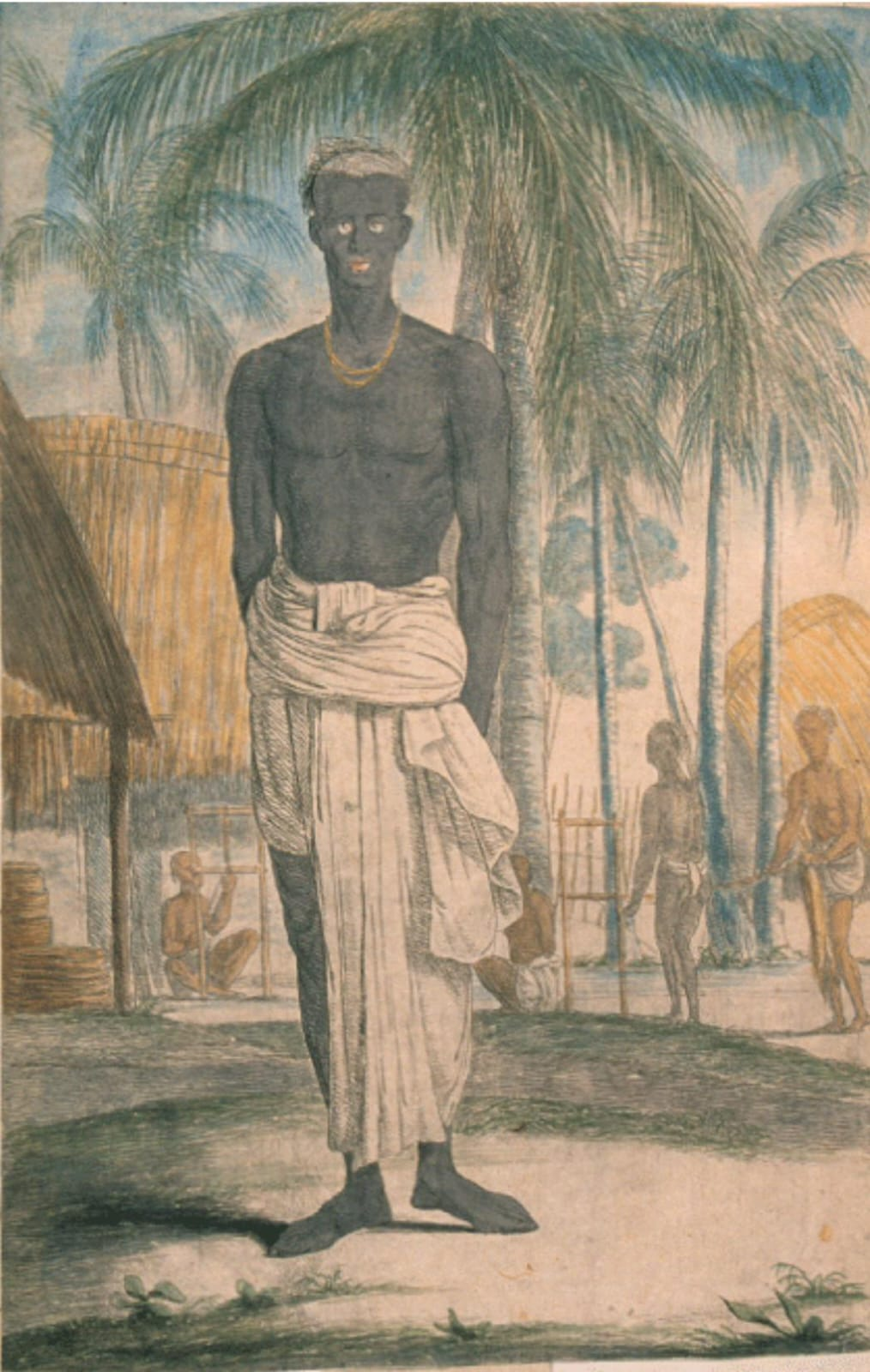
Kapali rope maker, from a 1799 collection of etchings

== Mythology ==
The ninth of the eleven Rudras of the thirty-three crore gods of Hindu pantheon is known as Kapali. According to Vamana Purana the Rudras were the sons of Kashyap and Aditi, while Matsya Purana mentions them as the offspring of the union between Brahma and Surabhi. The Harivamsa, an appendix to the Mahabharata mentions the Rudras as the children of Kashyap and Surabhi. The Adiparva of Mahabharata states that Kapali married the daughter of a sage and begot a son. According to Shourindra Kumar Ghosh, the progeny of their offspring came to be known as the Kapalis.

== History ==
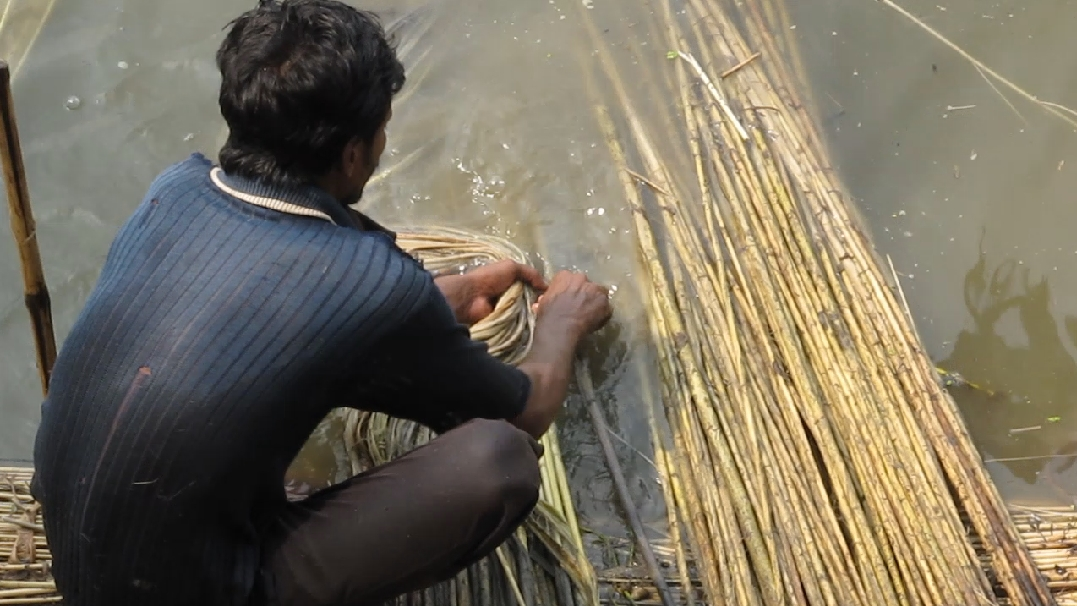
Extraction of jute fibre.

The Dom, Chandal, Savar, and Kapali were the cluster conferred as tribes during the Pala regime. According to Sarma, this caste was higher in status than the Dom and the so-called Chandal.

The caste claims to be of higher rank than the Bhūinmāli, Chandāl, or Sáha, and being descended from clean Südras the pure Dhobi and Nápit work for them. They adopted "Vaishya Kapali" caste name, to put forward the vaishya varna affiliation. The Purohit, who is distinct from that of the Kawāli, is a Patit Brähman. Their only gotra is Kasyapa; and the caste Panchäft is presided overby a headman, called Mu'tabar. Previously the community used the 'Kapali' surname extensively. The titles (surnames) found among the Kapális are Manjhi, Mandal, Shikdar, Mala, and Haldar; the families with the first three patronymics being regarded as higher than the others, while a larger sum is paid for their daughters. Subsequently, they adopted socially more dignified titles such as Das, Roy, Sarkar, Basu, Mitra, Ghose, Biswas. According to Sarkar, the Kapalis were arranged horizontally into elucidated and organised classes; the custom of kulinism was also exercised by them.

After the demotion in the social strata, the Kapalis took to agriculture, dairy farming and business. The Kapalis excelled in the cultivation of jute and the preparation of gunny bags from jute. Gradually they became prosperous and some of them even became wealthy landowners. During the reign of Maharaja Pratapaditya, many Kapalis were employed in the government as well as in the army. The Kapalis do not work as labourers, servants or domestic helps.

== Ethnology ==
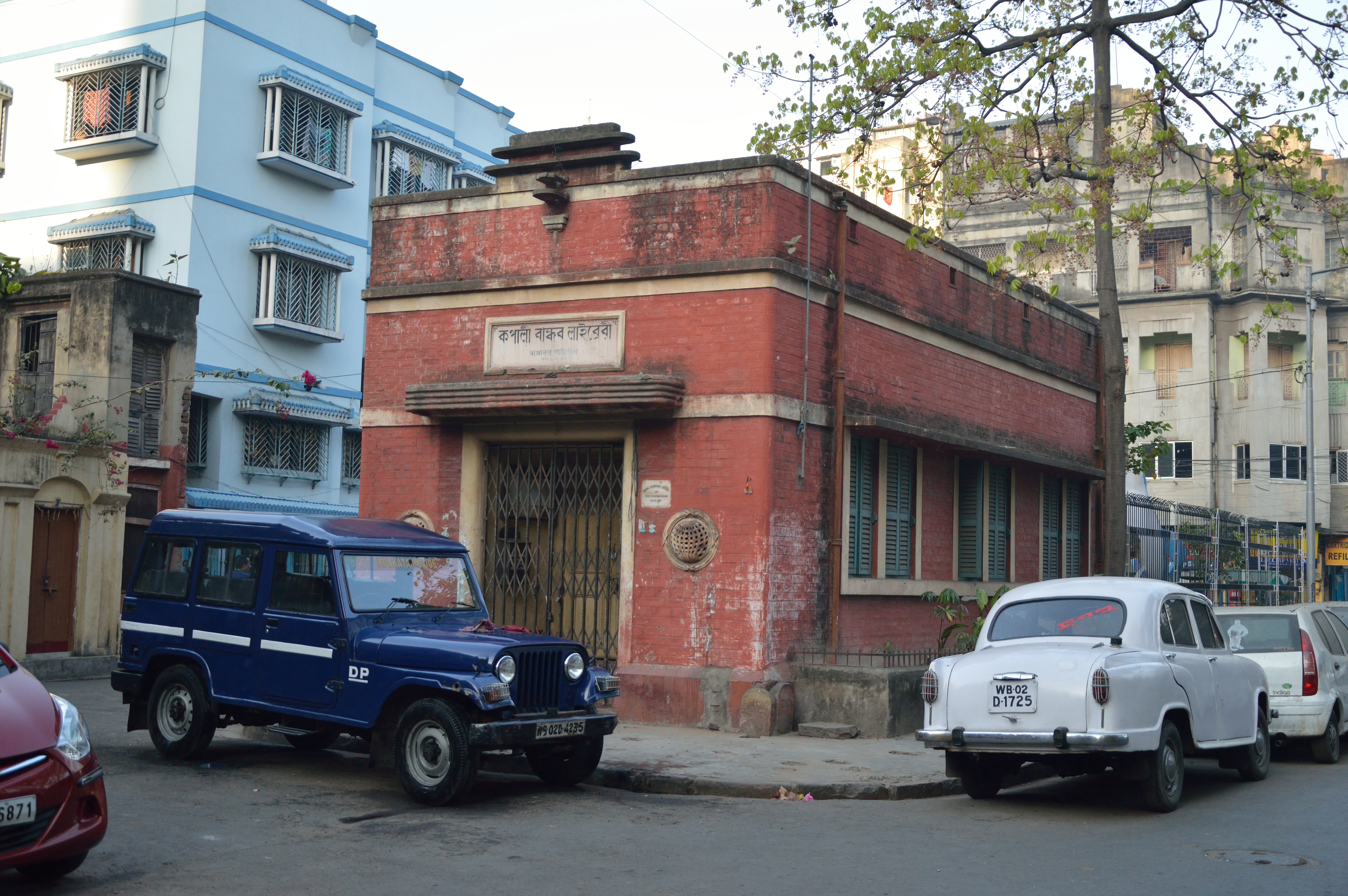
Kapali Bandhab Library in Kapalitola, Kolkata

The Kapalis usually have two gotras - Kashyap and Shiva. However Santosh Kumar Kundu mentions three gotras namely, Kashyap, Alambayana and Moudgalya. Some Kapalis still use Kapali as their surname.

== Religion ==
The Kapalis were originally Shaivites belonging to the school of Kashmir Shaivism, but later they embraced Buddhism. After the Bhakti movement, the Kapalis became Vaishnavas. In the present day, the majority of the Kapalis are Vaishnavas with a minority being Shaktas. The Kapalis follow the religious rituals with great devotion and piety. The Kapalis have separate Brahmins known as Goswamis. Satish Chandra Mitra too mentions that the Kapalis have separate Brahmins to serve them.
