= Shunri =

Bengali Hindu caste

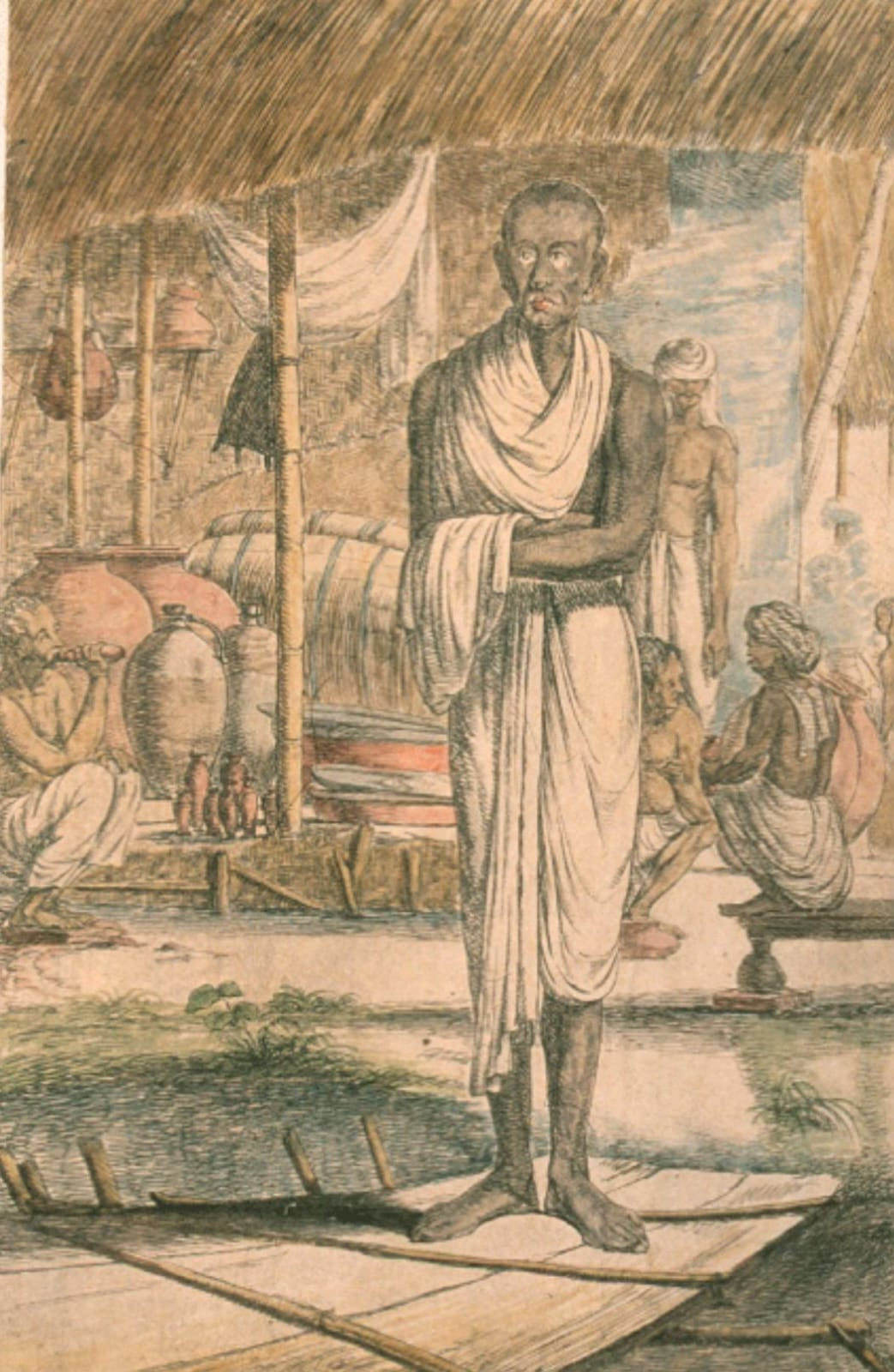
- Shunri wine maker, from a 1799 collection of etchings
- Kuladevi (female): Lakshmi
- Religions: Hinduism
- Languages: Bengali
- Populated states: West Bengal, Assam, Tripura, Bangladesh
- Population: 317,543 (West Bengal, 2001 census)
- Related groups: Sundhi

Shunri (Bengali: শুঁড়ি) is a Bengali Hindu caste whose traditional occupation is the distillation and selling of country wine.

== Population ==
In the census of 2001, the Shunris numbered 317,543 in West Bengal, consisting of 1.7% of the total Scheduled Caste population of the state.

== Religion ==
The Shunris are predominantly Vaishnavas. Lakshmi is their titular deity. Thursday being the weekly day of worship of Lakshmi, they used to keep their liquor shops closed. Even today, both the foreign and country liquor shops remain closed on Thursday. On the first day of Magh, they worship Bair Lakshmi with much pomp and grandeur. In the month of Kartik, they worship Kartik. The Shunris keep pigeons as pets, because they believe the flapping of their wings bring good luck to them.

== See also ==
- Saha (surname)
- Baishya Saha
