= Asit Kumar Saha =

Indian wrestler (born 1950)

Asit Kumar Saha (born 1950) is a former National level wrestler. He is now a wrestling coach in the State of West Bengal, India and the General Secretary of West Bengal Wrestling Association. Asit was trained by his father Sudhir Saha, International coach, from a very young age at Panchanan Bayam Samity, Kolkata. Asit was a State Champion from (1965-1973) in both Freestyle and Greco-Roman wrestling. He won the bronze medal in the Senior National Wrestling Championship, 1969. In 1978, he obtained his International FILA wrestling coaching license from Iran. Asit managed the Indian wrestling team for the 1982 Asian Games held in Delhi. India won 1 gold, 1 silver and 3 bronze medals. Asit also managed the Indian Wrestling team at the 1987 South Asian Games held in Kolkata, India. India won 7 out of 9 gold medals in the Championship. Further to this, he has managed the Indian wrestling team in several International Championships including World Championship. In 1987, Asit obtained his FILA Judge-Referee license at the Asian Wrestling Championships in Mumbai.

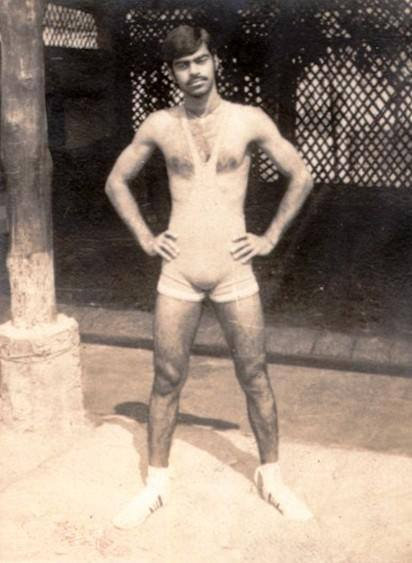
Asit Saha at Panchanan Bayam Samity, 1969

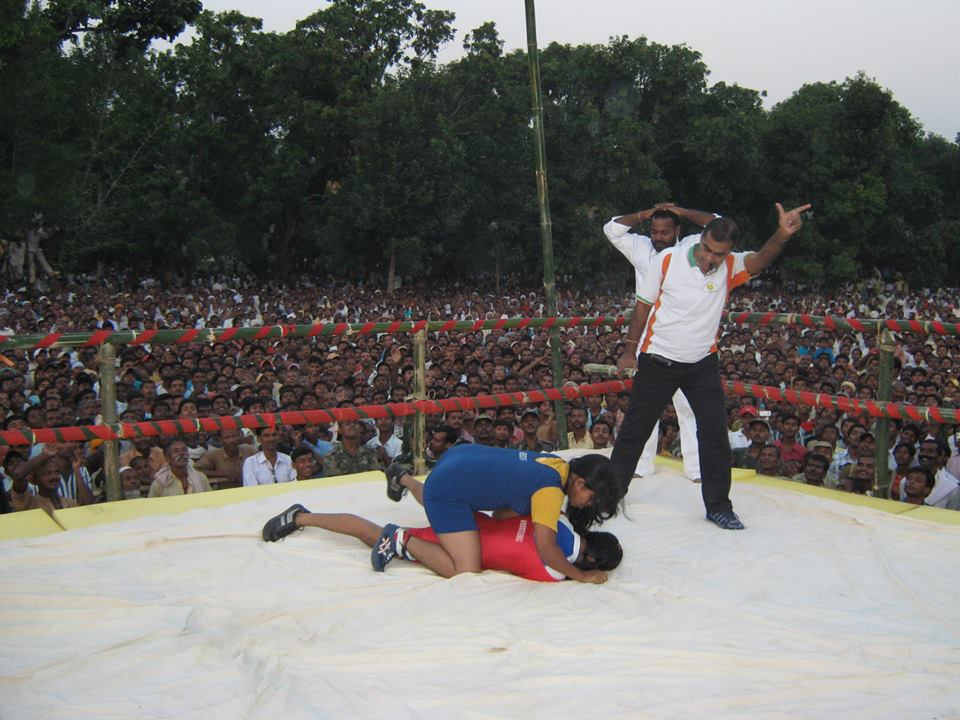
Asit Saha refereeing at an All India level tournament in Bihar

Below are some of his achievements.

Year	Championship
1987	Manager,3rd British World Wrestling Championship, Manchester, England
1987	Judge/Referee, Asian Wrestling Championships, Bombay
1991	Judge/Referee, Asian Wrestling Championships, Delhi
2007	Observer, 2nd Indo-Bangladesh Bangla Games, Dhaka, Bangladesh
2008	Director, Bangla–Bangladesh Wrestling Championship, Kolkata
2008	Director, Bangladesh-Bangla Wrestling Tournament, Dhaka, Bangladesh
2009	Judge/Referee, Bhagat Singh International Wrestling Tournament, Jallandhar
2009	Judge/Referee, Commonwealth Wrestling Tournament, Jallandhar
2010	Judge/Referee, Commonwealth Games, Delhi

Currently, Asit Kumar Saha holds the following positions listed below -

- General Secretary, West Bengal Wrestling Association
- Vice President, Wrestling Federation of India
- Vice President, Bengal Olympic Association

Asit started Women's Wrestling in West Bengal. His trainee Runu Ghoroi is the first National Institute of Sports wrestling coach in the State of West Bengal. In the Bangla - Bangladesh tournament 2011 held at Barasat, West Bengal won 6 out of 8 gold medals in women's wrestling. Under his leadership, the 58th Senior National Wrestling Championship was held in Kolkata, India from 14 to 17 November 2013 at the Netaji Indoor Stadium after 75 years.
