= Birajit Sinha =

Indian politician

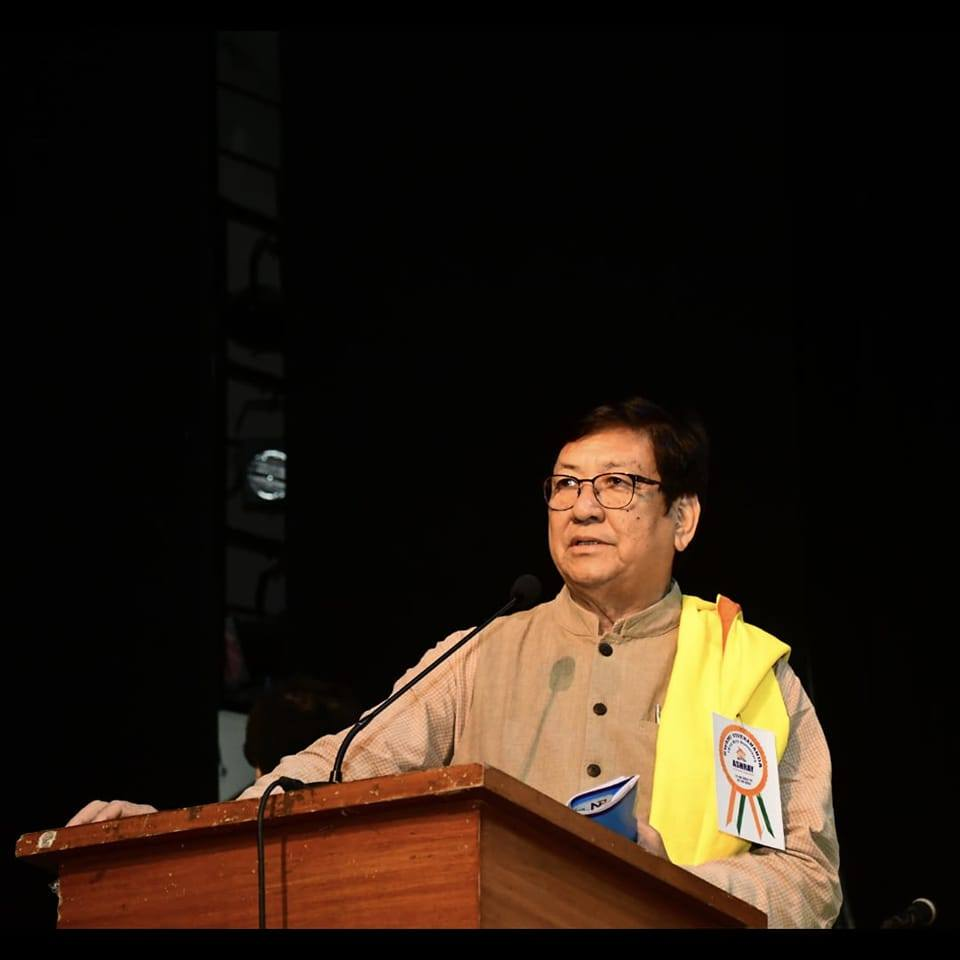
- Sinha in 2023

President of Tripura Pradesh Congress Committee
- In office 24 September 2021 – 17 June 2023
- Preceded by: Pijus Kanti Biswas
- Succeeded by: Ashish Kumar Saha
- In office 9 January 2015 – 22 March 2019
- Preceded by: Diba Chandra Hrangkhawl
- Succeeded by: Kirit Pradyot Debbarman

Cabinet Minister, Government of Tripura
- In office 5 February 1988 – 10 March 1993
- Governor: K. V. Krishna Rao; Sultan Singh; K. V. Raghunatha Reddy
- Chief Minister: Sudhir Ranjan Majumdar; Samir Ranjan Barman
- Succeeded by: Tapan Chakraborty

Member of the Tripura Legislative Assembly
- Incumbent
- Assumed office 2 March 2023
- Preceded by: Moboshar Ali
- Constituency: Kailashahar
- In office 1998–2018
- Preceded by: Tapan Chakraborty
- Succeeded by: Moboshar Ali

Personal details
- Party: Indian National Congress
- Spouse: Kanchan Sinha
- Children: Vishal Sinha, Rishiraj Sinha

Birajit Sinha is the Indian National Congress Legislative Party Leader of the Tripura Legislative Assembly, and a well known politician from Tripura, India representing Kailashahar as an MLA for his 6th term.

== Early life and career ==
Birajit Sinha joined student politics at the age of 17 in 1969, and has been an active member of the Indian National Congress since 1972. He was appointed president of the Tripura State Youth Congress in 1978 and continued in the role until 1990. He visited Oman in 1983 and China in 1985 as a member of Indian delegations to international youth festivals.

He also held a number of leadership roles in the INC, including membership of the National Council of the Indian Youth Congress and the All India Congress Committee.

He was first elected as a member of the Tripura Legislative Assembly in 1988 and served as cabinet minister from 1988 to 1993. He was again elected in 1998 and was Deputy Leader of Opposition in the Tripura Legislative Assembly from 1998 to 2000. In the 2003 Legislative Assembly elections he was the State Congress President and the chief ministerial candidate of INC, but while he was re-elected his party did not get a majority of seats.

In the 2008 and 2013 Legislative Assembly elections, he was re-elected to represent the Kailashahar constituency. He was appointed the President of the Tripura Pradesh Congress Committee on 9 January 2015.

He was again appointed as the President of the Tripura Pradesh Congress Committee in 2021, becoming the only state leader to be chosen as President of the Tripura Pradesh Congress Committee for a third term.

In 2023 Legislative Assembly elections he contested the Kailashahar constituency and won with 9686 votes against his BJP rival, securing the highest margin ever recorded from the constituency. He is currently representing Kailashahar for the 6th term, which is also highest number of terms served in that constituency by a single individual.

On 6 May 2025, he was appointed as the Congress Legislative Party Leader of Tripura Legislative Assembly. He is also the member of the Business Advisory Committee in Tripura Legislative Assembly.

=== Tripura Legislative Assembly elections ===
Year	Party	Constituency	Opponent		Result	Margin
1988	Indian National Congress)	Kailashahar	Communist Party of India (Marxist	Tapan Chakraborty	won	739
1998	Indian National Congress)	Kailashahar	Communist Party of India (Marxist	Tapan Chakrabarty	Won	1,027
2003	Indian National Congress)	Kailashahar	Communist Party of India (Marxist	Muhammad Khadim	Won	2,001
2008	Indian National Congress)	Kailashahar	Communist Party of India (Marxist	Jayanta Chakrabarty	Won	931
2013	Indian National Congress)	Kailashahar	Communist Party of India (Marxist	Mabashar Ali	Won	485
2023	Indian National Congress)	Kailashahar	BJP	Mabashar Ali	Won	9,686

== Other activities ==
Birajit Sinha is engaged in various social activities. He is the founding president of ASHRAY – a registered social voluntary organisation working in the areas of healthcare, welfare and national development. He is also involved with health camps and blood donation camps in rural and remote tribal areas. He is the Vice President of the Committee for National Integration, a national-based organisation that promotes national integration and communal harmony. He was awarded the Rashtriya Ekta Puraskar in 2000 for outstanding contributions to communal harmony in Tripura.

On several occasions, Birajit Sinha has demanded a railway station in Kailashahar as well as the reopening of the airport in Kailashahar. He has constantly raised matters of his constituency in and outside the Assembly.

Birajit Sinha has raised many corruption issues in Tripura. In October 2014, he held a daylong siege around the NRHM office in Kailasahar after irregularities of 32 crores were unearthed.

In early 2025, Birajit Sinha raised the issue of illegal embankments built by Bangladesh around the borders of Tripura in the Tripura Legislative Assembly after which the central and state government stepped in to take action. His initiative as an MLA was crucial in handling the international border matter.

In December 2025, an FIR was registered against Tripura Cabinet Minister Tinku Roy who was alleged to have forged his educational qualifications and hid his criminal cases in his election affidavit in 2023.
