= Karuna Shaha =

Indian artist (1921–1996)

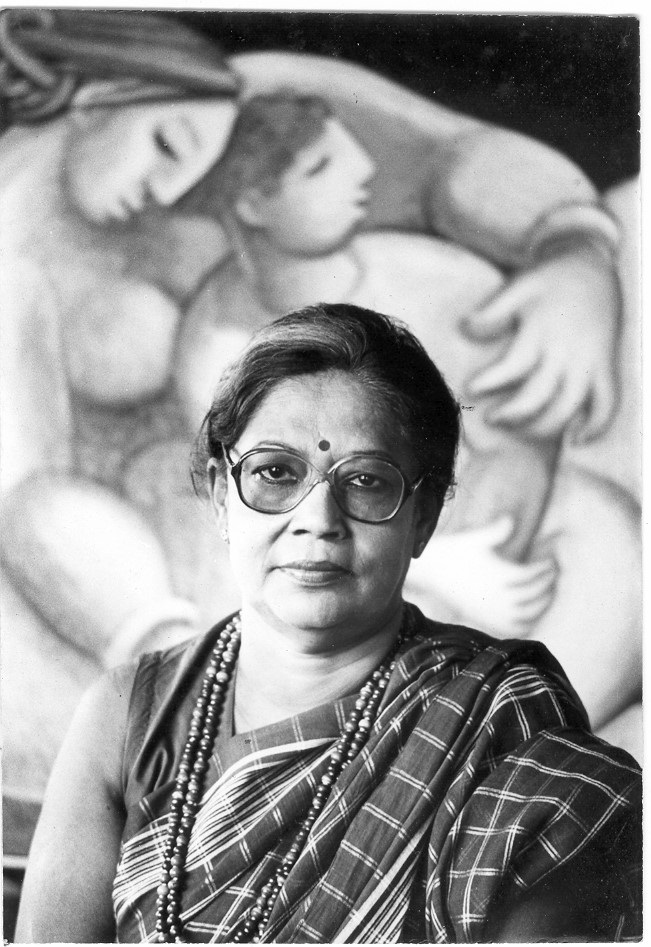
- Born: Karuna Ghosh; 1 January 1921; Calcutta, Bengal Presidency (now Kolkata, West Bengal)
- Died: 5 May 1996 (aged 75)
- Education: Government College of Art & Craft
- Spouse: Shambhu Shaha (m. 1946; died 1988)
- Children: Chandrima Shaha

Karuna Shaha (née Ghosh; 1 January 1921 – 5 May 1996) was an Indian artist. She was among the first few women to study at the Government School of Art in Calcutta. Shaha is well known for her nude studies in various media.

== Early life and education ==
Karuna was born on 1 January 1921 in Calcutta, Bengal Presidency (now Kolkata, West Bengal). From a very young age, she was trained in painting and singing at home by art and music tutors. One of her art teachers was O. C. Gangoly, who informed her parents about the new opening for girls in Government School of Art (now the Government College of Art & Craft). He further insisted that she pursue a formal art course if she wanted to become an artist. Subsequently, Karuna joined the art school after completing her matriculation from Beltala Girls' School in 1939. As a result, she was among the first group of women students to join the Government School of Art, Calcutta, from where she graduated in 1949.

== Career ==
=== Art ===
==== Early years ====
In 1948, Karuna won her first award at the annual student exhibition of the Government School of Art organized at the Academy of Fine Arts, Kolkata. The following year, her postage stamp design of the gateway of the Sanchi Stupa was selected and awarded in a pan-India competition. She also received several accolades for her poster, book cover and letter design at the 'Art in Industry' exhibition. A major assignment came her way in 1950 when she was asked to design a special nine feet-long alpana for the sets of the Jean Renoir film, The River. In the 50s, Karuna continued to work mainly on head and figure studies in various mediums, which was to become her forte.

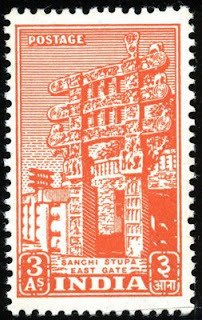
The 1949 postage stamp for which Karuna received an award

==== Studies in Italy ====
Shaha visited Florence, Italy after she received a scholarship from the Italian government. She studied at the Accademia di Belle Arti di Firenze from 1959 to 1962 and received a diploma in fresco and mural painting. During this time, she also got a chance to visit several other galleries and museums across Europe. Her studio training at the academy, as well as studies of European masters, further developed her interest in human figures, especially the nude. Back from Italy in 1962, Shaha gained a reputation in Calcutta as 'the lady who paints nudes'.

==== Later years ====
Following her return from Italy, Shaha tried her hand at some commercial art ventures. In partnership with another artist, she began her own commercial art agency, called Unit 62, which folded up soon after. Her stint in another advertising agency was short lived as well. Later, she found a stable career option in school teaching. In 1964, she joined the newly opened Modern High School for Girls, where she taught full-time until her retirement in 1988. With a plan to build a community for women artists of the time, Shaha spearheaded the formation of The Group, an artist collective which initially included Meera Mukherjee, Shanu Lahiri, Santosh Rohatgi and Shyamasree Basu. Their inaugural show was held in 1983 at the Academy of Fine Arts, Kolkata. The Group continued to exhibit in Kolkata, Delhi and Mumbai in the subsequent years. By the 1990s, Shaha's compositions became more surrealistic and largely depicted social symbolism.

=== Music ===
Along with her studies at the art school, Karuna had become an accomplished classical vocalist while training under teachers like Hirendra Goswami and Sachin Das Motilal. This was followed by playback singing for Bengali movies. Between 1944 and 1946, her singing ventures also brought her into contact with the Indian People's Theatre Association. She toured and performed in different areas with this troupe. Over time, she also became a regular participant in the All India Radio programmes, and two of her Rabindra Sangeet records were released by His Master's Voice.

== Personal life ==
In 1946, Karuna married Shambhu Shaha, a photographer known for his photos of Rabindranath Tagore and Santiniketan. They had one daughter, Chandrima Shaha who is a renowned biologist.

== Death and legacy ==
Shaha died on 5 May 1996. A retrospective of her works was organized at the Art Heritage Gallery, New Delhi, in 1996–97. Introducing Karuna in the exhibition catalogue, art critic Prasant Daw wrote, 'No discussion of contemporary art in India would be complete without reference to the valuable contribution made by Karuna Shaha, one of the most forthright and fearless women artists of Bengal.'
