= Chandrima Shaha =

Indian biologist (born 1952)

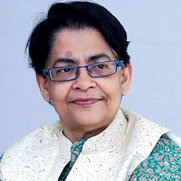
- Shaha in January 2020
- Born: 14 October 1952 (age 73); Calcutta, West Bengal, India
- Education: University of Calcutta (B.Sc.); University of Calcutta (M.Sc.); University of Calcutta (Ph.D); Post doctoral; University of Kansas Medical Centre (1980–1982) Population Council, New York City (1983–1984)
- Alma mater: University of Calcutta
- Known for: Mechanisms of cellular defense from oxidative stress and modalities of cell death in a multicellular model of mammalian germ cells and a unicellular model of a protozoan parasite.
- Parent: Karuna Shaha (mother)
- Scientific career
- Fields: Biology
- Institutions: Currently JC Bose Chair Distinguished Professor of National Academy of Sciences at Indian Institute of Chemical Biology, Kolkata; Indian National Science Academy (President); National Institute of Immunology (Former Director and Prof. of Eminence)
- Thesis: Antifertility and related studies on the extractives of aristolochia indica LINN (1979)
- Doctoral advisor: Dr A Pakrashi
- Website: website

Chandrima Shaha (born 14 October 1952) is an Indian biologist. As of September 2021, she is the J. C. Bose Chair Distinguished Professor at the Indian Institute of Chemical Biology, Kolkata. She is the former Director and former Professor of Eminence at the National Institute of Immunology. She was the President of Indian National Science Academy (2020–22) and the Vice President (International Affairs) of the same academy (2016–2018). She is an elected fellow of the World Academy of Sciences, Indian National Science Academy, Indian Academy of Sciences, National Academy of Sciences and the West Bengal Academy of Science and Technology.

== Education ==
Shaha graduated from the University of Calcutta and completed her doctoral research in 1980 from the Indian Institute of Chemical Biology and holds a Ph.D. from the University of Calcutta. For her post doctoral work, she was at the University of Kansas Medical Centre from 1980 to 1982 and then from 1983 to 1984 at the Population Council, New York City.

== Professional life ==
Shaha has served as Council Member for the National Academy of Sciences, Allahabad (2016–2017), Indian Academy of Sciences, Bangalore (2013–2015) and also as Council member of the Indian National Science Academy, New Delhi (2015–18). She was a member of the editorial board of ‘Scientific Reports’ of Nature Publishing Group, London:‘Spermatogenesis’, Landes Bioscience, Texas and editorial board member of ‘Molecular and Cellular Endocrinology’ of Elsevier, PA, Austin. During her career, she was a member of the Steering Committee for the Task Force on Regulation of Male Fertility of the World Health Organization, Geneva (1990–1992), Switzerland and International Consortium on Male Contraception, New York (1993–1997). She was the Chair of the DBT Task Force on Biotechnology Based Programme for Women (2012–2014), member of Task Force on Human Genetics and Genome Analysis, Task Force on Basic Research in Modern Biology (2015–2017), Department of Biotechnology. She was Member of the Scientific Advisory Board, Indian Council of Medical Research (2013–2016). She is currently the Governing Council member of IIT Gandhinagar and a member of 2018 leadership conclave. She is currently serving as the Member of the Governing Council- ICMR: Executive Council – University of Hyderabad: Governing Council – InStem, Bangalore: Scientific Advisory Group – ICMR: Scientific Advisory Committee – National Institute of Animal Biotechnology: Scientific Advisory Committee – Rajiv Gandhi Center for Biotechnology, Trivandrum. She served on the Scientific Advisory Committee, Life Science Research Board, DRDO (2012–2016).

== Research interests ==
Shaha's research programme is geared towards the understanding of cell death pathways and cellular defense processes in unicellular and multicellular organisms that have important bearing on designing of therapies for various diseases. Kala-azar, a neglected tropical disease remains a huge problem being endemic in certain parts of the country and is caused by the Leishmania parasite. Understanding of how parasite death occurs is important as successful killing of the parasite would reduce disease burden. The research demonstrated the ability of the Leishmania parasite to execute death phenotypes similar to metazoans and experimental evidence demonstrated the involvement of the single mitochondrion in apoptosis like death in one of the earliest eukaryotes. Host-parasite interaction studies show the involvement of Bcl-2 proteins in parasite survival. Other studies with cells having high division index like cancer cells and mammalian germ cells provides insight into the various pathways that are triggered by stress and their functional relevance in cell survival.

== Awards and honors ==
- Dr. SP Ray-Chaudhuri Memorial Lecture Award India (2023)
- Dr. SP Ray-Chaudhuri endowment Award Lecture, Society of Cell Biology, India for 2020 (2021).
- Biopharma Awards, Lifetime Achievement Award, 2021
- D.P. Burma Memorial Lecture Award - 2019
- Shanti Swarup Bhatnagar Medal, INSA, 2019
- Sectional President, Biological Sciences, National Academy of Sciences, 2017
- Elected Council Member, National Academy of Sciences, Allahabad, 2016
- Elected, Vice-president of the Indian National Science Academy, 2016
- Sunday Standard Devi Award for Excellence in the field of science, 2015
- Om Prakash Bhasin Award, 2015
- Elected Fellow, The World Academy of Sciences (TWAS), Trieste, Italy, 2014
- 14th Pushpa Sriramachari Foundation Day Oration Award, ICMR, 2014
- Prof. (Mrs.) Archana Sharma Memorial Award, National Academy of Sciences, 2013
- Chandrakala Hora Memorial Medal, Indian National Science Academy, 2013
- Elected, Fellow of West Bengal Academy of Science and Technology, 2011
- Ranbaxy Science Foundation Award for Basic Medical Research 2010
- Dr. Darshan Ranganathan Memorial Award, Indian National Science Academy, 2010
- J.C. Bose National Fellowship, Dept. of Science and Technology, 2009
- Elected Fellow, Indian National Science Academy, Delhi, 2008
- Elected Fellow, Indian Academy of Sciences, Bangalore, 2004
- Department of Biotechnology 'Special Award' on the occasion of DNA discovery, 2003
- Elected Fellow, The National Academy of Sciences, Allahabad, India 1999
- Shakuntala Amirchand Award of Indian Council of Medical Research, New Delhi, 1992

== Selected publications ==
=== Book ===
- Captured Moments: A Life of Shambhu Shaha by Chandrima Shaha, Seagull Publishers, Calcutta (2000).
