= Gupteshwar Misra =

Gupteshwar Misra was a wrestler and coach from India. He had a brilliant career in wrestling from 1938-1952. During this time, he won the Bengal State Wrestling Championship in light and feather weight classes. He won the National Wrestling Championship in 1938 and 1940 in lightweight category. After 1952, he devoted all his time to coaching, including training the Indian wrestling team for International Championships.

He became International/Judge referee in 1960. He was an active member of West Bengal Wrestling Federation from 1963. He was also the Joint Secretary of Referee/Judges Association of India. He was the chief wrestling coach of the Indian wrestling team for the 1967 World Wrestling Championships, New Delhi, India., where Bishamber Singh won the silver medal in the 57 kg weight category.
