= Nityanand Saha =

Indian revolutionary (1933–1955)

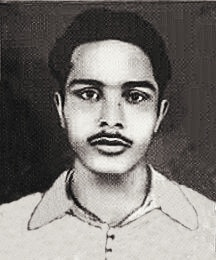
- Sketch of Saha
- Born: 2 March 1933; Tangail, Bengal Presidency, British India
- Died: 13 August 1955 (aged 22); Vengurla, Bombay State, India
- Occupation: Revolutionary
- Organization: Janata Seva Sangh
- Movement: Goan independence movement

Nityanand Saha (2 March 1933 – 3 August 1955) was an Indian revolutionary, known mainly for his involvement in the Satyagraha movement against the Portuguese government, to free Goa from Portuguese rule, under socialist leader Ram Manohar Lohia. He was an active member of Janata Seva Sangh in Payradanga, Nadia, Bengal Presidency, and on 13 August 1955, he was shot dead by the Portuguese government, along with his associates Baburao Thorat and Karnail Singh.

== Early life and career ==
Nityanand Saha was born on 2 March 1933 in Porabari village, Tangail District of Bengal Presidency. He received his education at Thatya Jaburi College and passed his matriculation exam in 1949. After the partition of India, he left his homeland and settled in the Preetinagar division of Payradanga. He joined the Janata Seva Sangh of Payradanga at a young age, under Kitish Mohan Babu.

== Death ==
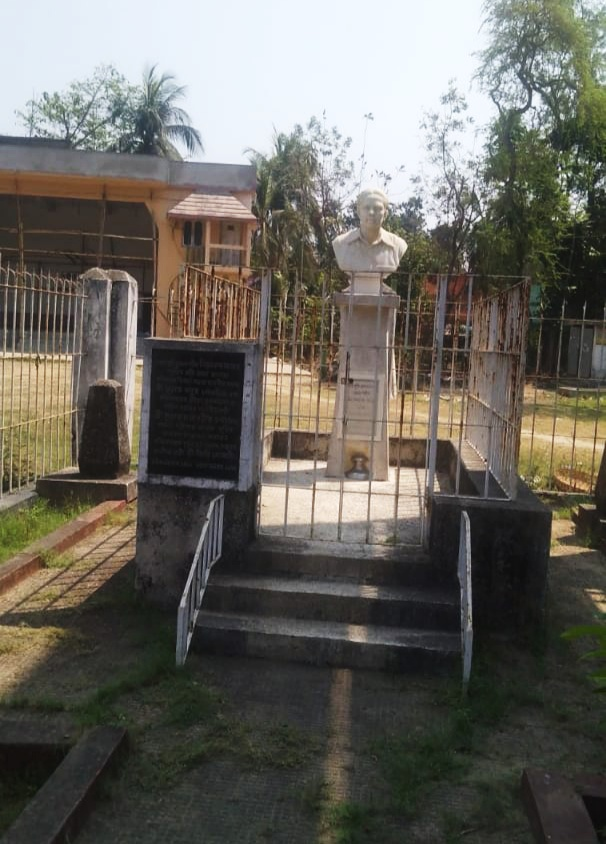
Memorial of Saha, near Payradanga Railway Station, West Bengal.

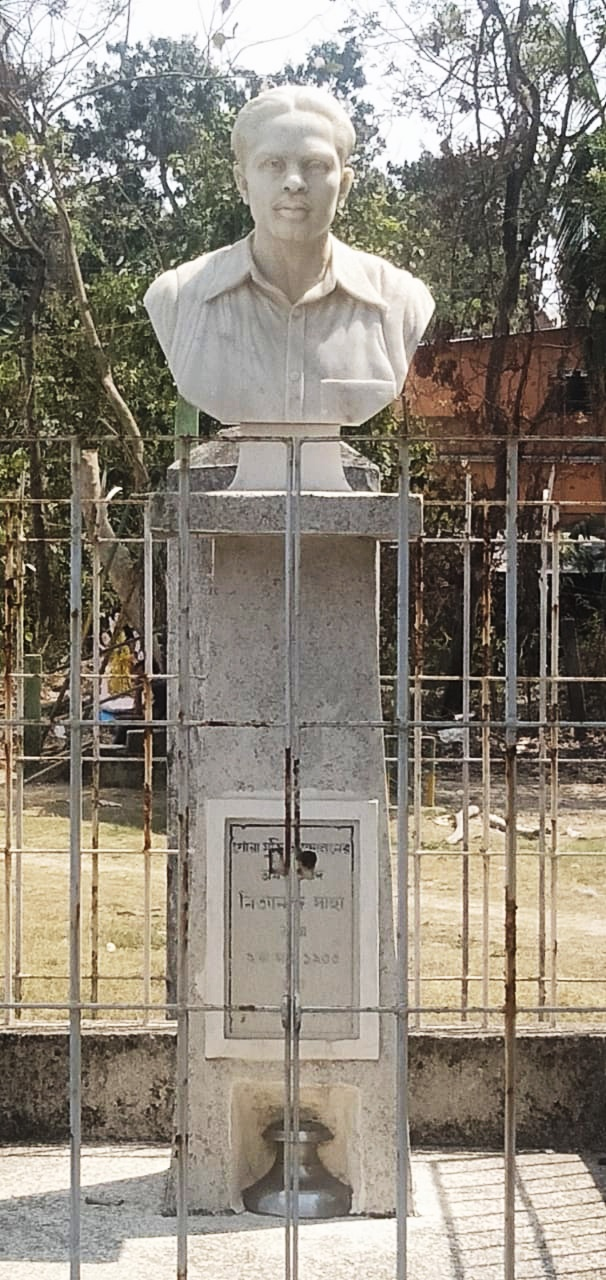
Bust of Saha along with his ashes below his bust, Payradanga, West Bengal.

He always wanted to be a martyr for his country's freedom, but after India became independent in 1947, he gave up his hope to be a martyr. He was inspired by Mahatma Gandhi's nonviolence ideas and his determination to do something for his country. He joined the Satyagraha movement in Goa in 1955 to fight against the fascism of the Portuguese government in Goa. Many satyagrahis came from other parts of India to join the Goan independence movement. On 13 August 1955, a non-violent satyagraha movement started by Nityanand, with two of his associates, Baburao Thorat of Maharastra, and Karnail Singh of Punjab. But the Portuguese police couldn't tolerate this movement and shot the three of them: Nityanand, Karnail Singh and Baburao Thorat. Nityanand succumbed to his injuries, and on the same day, 13 August 1955, he died in Vengurla Hospital.

== Legacy ==
The Paryadanga Smriti Sangh built a memorial in his memory in 1994, near the Payradanga railway station, which still stands today. Portuguese Church Street in Kolkata was renamed as Saheed Nityananda Saha Sarani.
