= Ashish Kumar Saha =

Indian politician

Ashish Saha

President Tripura Pradesh Congress Committee
- Incumbent
- Assumed office 17 June 2023
- Preceded by: Birajit Sinha

Member of the Tripura Legislative Assembly
- In office 2009–2022
- Preceded by: Sudhir Ranjan Majumdar
- Succeeded by: Manik Saha
- Constituency: Town Bordowali

Personal details
- Born: 2 January 1960 (age 66)
- Party: Indian National Congress

Ashish Kumar Saha is an Indian politician from Tripura, India. He is currently serving as President of the Tripura Pradesh Congress Committee.

In the 2018 assembly elections, he was elected from the Town Bardowali constituency in West Tripura in Tripura Legislative Assembly.

== Political career ==
In 2016, he was one of six MLAs from the Indian National Congress who joined Trinamool Congress, due to dissatisfaction over the INC allying with the Communist Party of India (Marxist) in the 2016 West Bengal Legislative Assembly election.

On 23 December 2016, Saha demanded that Tripura Forest and Rural development Minister Naresh Jamatia (CPI-M) be removed over a sex scandal that Jamatia was allegedly involved in.

In August 2017, he was one of the six MLAs from the Trinamool Congress who joined the Bharatiya Janata Party. In 2022 he rejoined the Indian National Congress.
