= Baishya Saha =

Bengali Hindu trading caste

Baishya Saha (Bengali: বৈশ্য সাহা), or Saha, is a Bengali Hindu trading caste traditionally known to have the occupation of grocers, shopkeepers, dealers, moneylenders, and farmers.

== Origin ==
Śauṇḍik (vintner) finds mention in one image inscription of Pāla period along with some other occupational groups. The Upapuranas played a significant role in creating the caste origin and hierarchy in Bengal. The name Śauṇḍik (Madhyamsamkar, lit. middle mixed) is found in 13th-century work Brihaddharma Purana. According to Hitesranjan Sanyal, Saha is a dissident group of Śauṇḍik or Shunri.

== History ==
According to historian Jyotirmoyee Sarma, before the seventh or the eighth centuries A.D. when historical evidence indicates that the society was based largely on trade and commerce, the merchant classes had a notably high position in society. The low rank experienced by the trading communities including Shunri (winemakers and sellers), possibly indicates that the primary economic activities of the Bengali society shifted from trade and capital producing devices to cottage industries and agriculture. The caste ranks of the merchant classes became more and more lowered and reached a decidedly low stage at the beginning of the Sena and Varman periods.

Saha as a distinct sub-caste did not flourish in Bengal before the mid-nineteenth century. Saha is a merchant caste, which has a low ritual rank, but notably good literacy and secular rank.

Sahas were included in the list of 177 "backward classes" for the state of West Bengal by Mandal Commission, but the state government hasn't yet recognised Saha as such, and they still belong to General category.

== Varna status ==
Traditionally the Bengal society is divided into two varnas, Brahmin and Shudra. The Sahas belong to the Jal-achal Shudra category, whose water was not accepted by the upper castes. Sahas started to claim Vaishya status in the 1931 censuses report, but the evidence of history, literature, and scriptures suggest nothing in favour of their claim.

== See also ==
- Saha (surname)
