= 1983 Tripura Legislative Assembly election =

State assembly election in India

- 1 May 1983

60 seats in the Assembly 31 seats needed for a majority
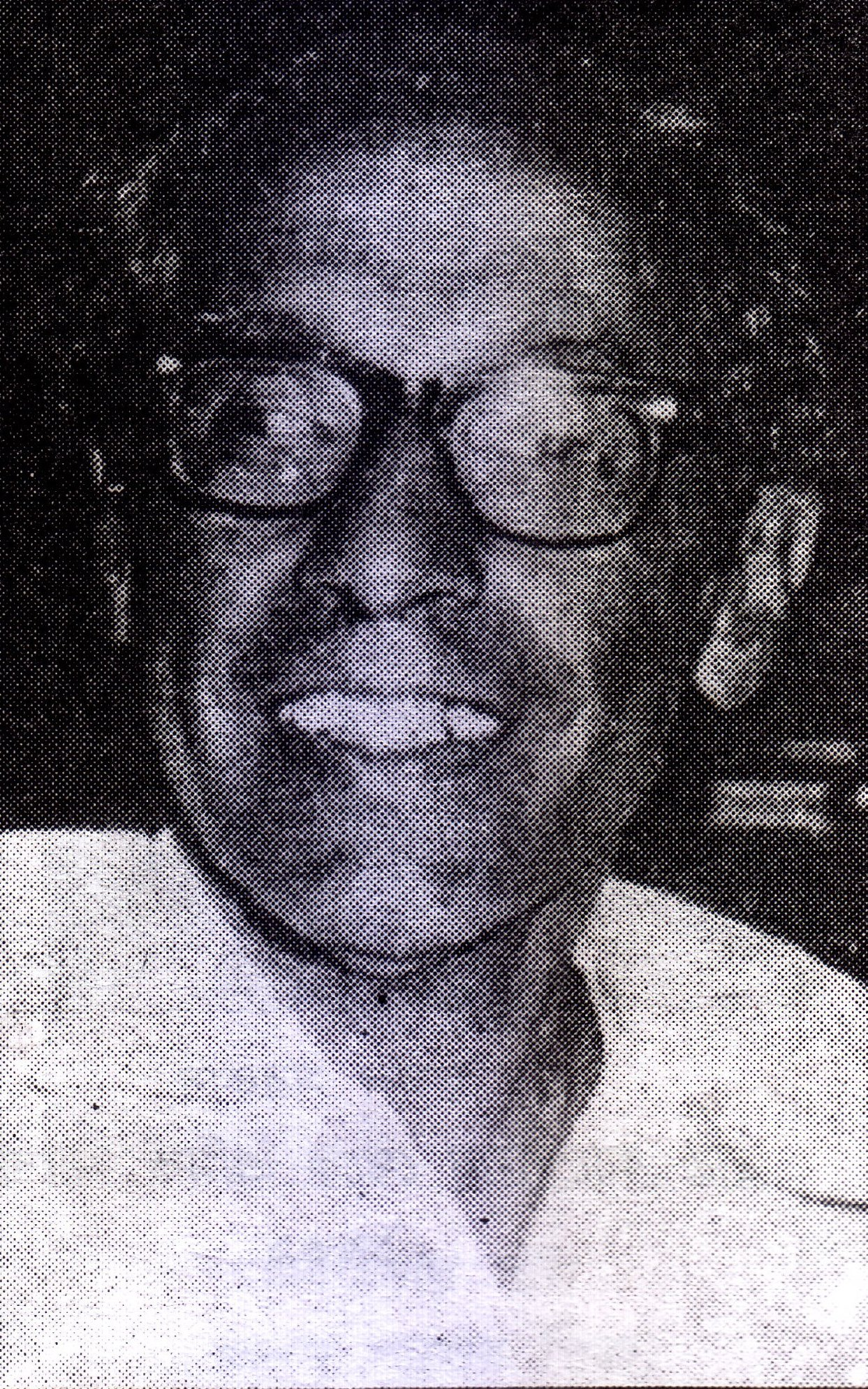

	First party	Second party	Third party
			TUS
Leader	Nripen Chakraborty	-	-
Party	CPI(M)	INC	TUS
Leader's seat	Pramodenagar	-	-
Last election	51	0	4
Seats won	37	12	6
Seat change	▼14	▲12	▲2
Popular vote	433,608	282,859	97,039
Percentage	46.78%	30.51%	10.47%
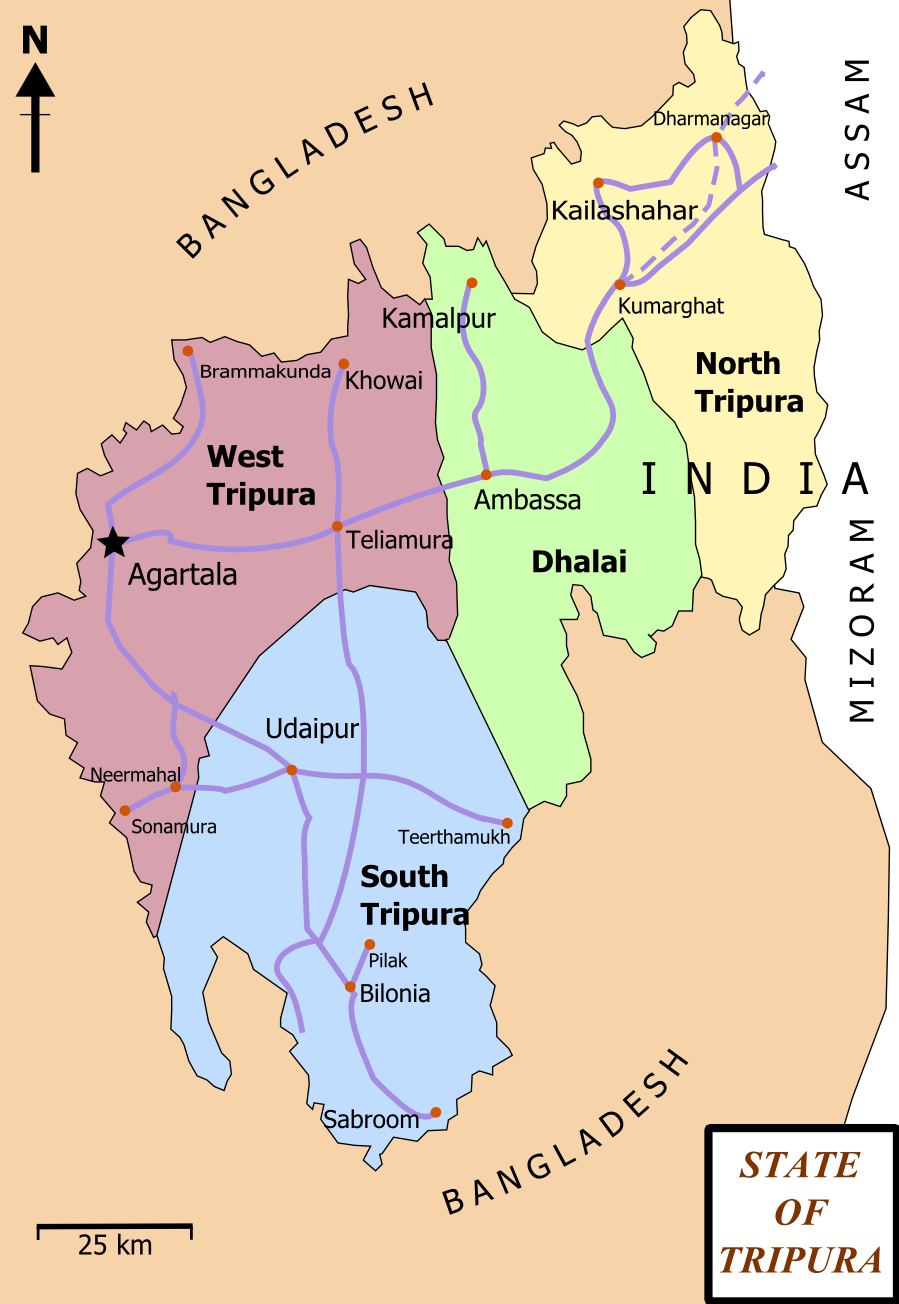
- Tripura district map
Chief Minister before election
Nripen Chakraborty
CPI(M)
Elected Chief Minister
Nripen Chakraborty
CPI(M)

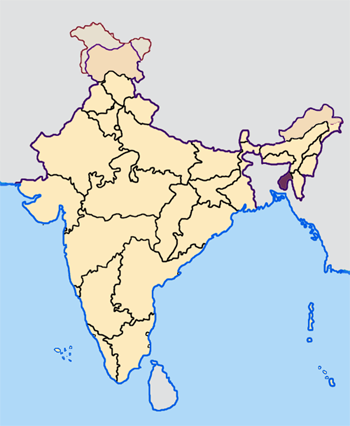
Tripura

The 1983 Tripura Legislative Assembly election took place on 1 May 1983, to elect the Members of the Legislative Assembly (MLAs) from each of the 60 Assembly constituencies in Tripura, India.

The Communist Party of India (Marxist) (CPI(M)), led by Nripen Chakraborty, won 37 seats and formed the Government in Tripura.

== Highlights ==
Election for all 60 assembly constituencies of the Tripura Legislative Assembly were conducted in a single phase, on February 15, 1993.

=== Participating Political Parties ===
Partytype Abbreviation	Party	
National Parties
1	BJP	Bhartiya Janta Party
2	CPI	Communist Party of India
3	CPM	Communist Party of India (Marxist)
4	ICS	Indian Congress (Socialist)
5	INC	Indian National Congress
6	JNP	Janata Party
State Parties
7	FBL	All India Forward BlocK
8	RSP	Revolutionary Socialist Party
9	TUS	Tripura Upajati Zuba Samiti
Independents
10	IND	Independent

=== No. of Constituencies ===
Type of Constituencies	GEN	SC	ST	Total
No. of Constituencies	33	7	20	60

=== Electors ===
	Men	Women	Total
No.of Electors	579,123	555,134	1,134,257
No.of Electors who Voted	495,281	446,504	941,785
Polling Percentage	85.52%	80.43%	83.03%

=== Performance of Women Candidates ===
	Men	Women	Total
No.of Contestants	195	11	206
Elected	56	04	60

== Result ==
=== Results by party ===
Party	Seats contested	Seats won	No. of votes	% of votes	1977 Seats
Communist Party of India (Marxist)	56	37	433,608	46.78%	51
Indian National Congress	45	12	282,859	30.51%	0
Tripura Upajati Juba Samiti	14	6	97,039	10.47%	4
Revolutionary Socialist Party	2	2	15,218	1.64%	2
Communist Party of India	1	0	7,657	0.83%	0
All India Forward Block	1	0	6,549	0.71%	1
Bharatiya Janata Party	4	0	578	0.06%	-
Indian Congress Secular	3	0	540	0.06%	-
Janata Party	5	0	515	0.06%	0
Independents	75	3	82,443	8.89%	2
Total	206	60	927,006		
Source: ECI

=== Results by constituency ===
Winner, runner-up, voter turnout, and victory margin in every constituency
Assembly Constituency		Turnout	Winner				Runner Up				Margin
#k	Names	%	Candidate	Party	Votes	%	Candidate	Party	Votes	%	Margin
1	Simna	83.41%	Abhiram Debbarma	CPI(M)	9,206	65.23%	Kripa Rani Debbarma	TUS	4,828	34.21%	4,378
2	Mohanpur	80.89%	Dhirendra Chandra Debnath	INC	6,568	45.07%	Radharaman Debnath	CPI(M)	5,953	40.85%	615
3	Bamutia	85.47%	Haricharan Sarkar	CPI(M)	7,417	50.79%	Prafulla Kumar Das	INC	7,023	48.09%	394
4	Barjala	83.66%	Gouri Bhattacharjee	CPI(M)	8,160	49.3%	Basana Chakraborty	Independent	4,904	29.63%	3,256
5	Khayerpur	83.34%	Sudhir Ranjan Majumder	INC	8,539	52.98%	Akhil Debnath	CPI(M)	7,321	45.43%	1,218
6	Agartala	80.44%	Manik Sarkar	CPI(M)	10,623	52.18%	Promode Ranjandas Gupta	INC	9,485	46.59%	1,138
7	Ramnagar	80.24%	Biren Dutta	CPI(M)	8,026	50.8%	Amar Ranjan Gupta	INC	7,640	48.35%	386
8	Town Bordowali	79.31%	Ashok Kumar Bhattacharya	INC	7,689	52.95%	Brajagopal Roy	AIFB	6,549	45.1%	1,140
9	Banamalipur	82.11%	Sukhamoy Sen Gupta	INC	6,883	52.43%	Bibekananda Bhowmik	CPI(M)	5,913	45.04%	970
10	Majlishpur	83.16%	Khagen Das	CPI(M)	6,397	44.21%	Ranjit Saha	INC	4,901	33.87%	1,496
11	Mandaibazar	81.%	Rashiram Debbarma	CPI(M)	9,861	56.04%	Amiya Kumar Debbarma	TUS	7,594	43.16%	2,267
12	Takarjala	79.35%	Sudhanwa Debbarma	CPI(M)	9,029	59.83%	Suriya Kumar Debbarma	TUS	5,930	39.29%	3,099
13	Pratapgarh	85.63%	Anil Sarkar	CPI(M)	12,736	58.4%	Monomohan Das	INC	8,758	40.16%	3,978
14	Badharghat	82.65%	Jadab Majumder	CPI(M)	11,244	56.37%	Niranjan Paul	INC	8,551	42.87%	2,693
15	Kamalasagar	84.88%	Matilal Sarkar	CPI(M)	7,601	50.85%	Monoranjan Laskar	INC	7,170	47.97%	431
16	Bishalgarh	84.65%	Bhanu Lal Saha	CPI(M)	7,340	51.54%	Samir Ranjan Barman	INC	6,900	48.46%	440
17	Golaghati	81.76%	Budha Debbarma	TUS	8,011	50.18%	Niranjan Debbarma	CPI(M)	7,198	45.09%	813
18	Charilam	83.44%	Parimal Chandra Saha	INC	8,528	52.7%	Braja Gopal Bhowmik	CPI(M)	7,302	45.12%	1,226
19	Boxanagar	88.79%	Araber Rahaman	CPI(M)	7,022	51.21%	Munsur Ali	INC	6,648	48.49%	374
20	Nalchar	89.03%	Narayan Das	INC	7,420	49.94%	Sumanta Kumar Das	CPI(M)	7,210	48.53%	210
21	Sonamura	87.97%	Rashik Lal Roy	INC	7,264	51.55%	Subal Rudra	CPI(M)	6,623	47.%	641
22	Dhanpur	89.26%	Samar Chowdhury	CPI(M)	8,795	54.02%	Brajendra Kumar Ghosh	INC	7,487	45.98%	1,308
23	Ramchandraghat	87.55%	Dasarath Deb	CPI(M)	11,451	86.89%	Bathsailyamani Jamatia	TUS	1,728	13.11%	9,723
24	Khowai	88.15%	Samir Deb Sarkar	CPI(M)	5,777	45.18%	Sukhamoy Kar	INC	3,587	28.05%	2,190
25	Asharambari	85.91%	Bidya Chandra Debbarma	CPI(M)	11,360	79.67%	Kishalaya Kanti Debbarma	INC	1,591	11.16%	9,769
26	Pramodenagar	87.6%	Nripen Chakraborty	CPI(M)	10,845	60.87%	Siromani Roy	Independent	5,212	29.25%	5,633
27	Kalyanpur	84.93%	Makhan Lal Chakraborty	CPI(M)	7,064	49.%	Debabrata Datta	Independent	4,566	31.67%	2,498
28	Krishnapur	71.86%	Kali Kumar Debbarma	CPI(M)	7,267	54.29%	Maharaja Kumar Sahadeb Bikaram Kishore Debbarma	INC	5,059	37.8%	2,208
29	Teliamura	83.15%	Gita Chowdhury	INC	6,835	42.48%	Jitendra Sarkar	CPI(M)	5,984	37.19%	851
30	Bagma	81.6%	Rati Mohan Jamaitia	TUS	10,157	62.93%	Gunapada Jamatia	CPI(M)	5,506	34.11%	4,651
31	Salgarh	87.11%	Gopal Chandra Das	RSP	8,148	53.21%	Kamini Kumar Das	INC	7,032	45.92%	1,116
32	Radhakishorpur	84.17%	Jogesh Chakraborty	RSP	7,070	51.44%	Bhanu Gopal Baisnab	INC	6,590	47.95%	480
33	Matarbari	86.26%	Maharani Bibhu Kumari Devi	INC	9,195	57.41%	Madhab Saha	CPI(M)	6,625	41.36%	2,570
34	Kakraban	87.28%	Keshab Chandra Majumder	CPI(M)	8,256	52.%	Nanik Chandra Das	INC	7,521	47.37%	735
35	Rajnagar	87.29%	Nakul Das	CPI(M)	10,144	54.83%	Bhuban Mohan Das	INC	7,951	42.98%	2,193
36	Belonia	87.18%	Manoranjan Majumder	Independent	8,081	50.75%	Jitendra Lal Das	CPI	7,657	48.08%	424
37	Santirbazar	83.85%	Shyama Charan Tripura	TUS	10,478	55.63%	Narayan Chandra Kar	CPI(M)	7,759	41.19%	2,719
38	Hrishyamukh	90.43%	Badal Chowdhury	CPI(M)	9,204	53.87%	Amal Mallik	INC	7,703	45.08%	1,501
39	Jolaibari	83.61%	Kashi Ram Reang	INC	6,718	51.9%	Brajamohan Jamatia	CPI(M)	6,227	48.1%	491
40	Manu	83.5%	Angju Mog	INC	10,304	55.2%	Jitendra Kumar Chowdhury	CPI(M)	8,362	44.8%	1,942
41	Sabroom	87.5%	Sunil Kumar Chowdhury	CPI(M)	9,118	52.55%	Adhir Chandra Bhaumik	INC	7,981	46.%	1,137
42	Ampinagar	75.29%	Nagendra Jamatia	TUS	9,449	58.99%	Madhu Sudan Kalai	CPI(M)	4,941	30.84%	4,508
43	Birganj	79.77%	Jawhar Saha	Independent	8,747	48.54%	Syjmal Kanti Saha	CPI(M)	6,352	35.25%	2,395
44	Raima Valley	71.66%	Rabindra Debbarma	TUS	7,772	51.82%	Anand Mohan Reaja	CPI(M)	7,225	48.18%	547
45	Kamalpur	89.17%	Bimal Singha	CPI(M)	7,674	59.48%	Kanak Ranjan Ghosh	INC	5,161	40.%	2,513
46	Surma	86.82%	Rudreswar Das	CPI(M)	7,763	51.45%	Harendra Chandra Das	INC	6,215	41.19%	1,548
47	Salema	84.5%	Dinesh Debbarma	CPI(M)	8,032	51.65%	Bijoy Kumar Jamatia	TUS	6,761	43.48%	1,271
48	Kulai	78.96%	Diba Chandra Harangkhal	TUS	8,419	50.78%	Kamini Debbarma	CPI(M)	7,480	45.12%	939
49	Chawamanu	75.94%	Purna Mohan Tripura	CPI(M)	6,662	50.24%	Jadumohan Tripura	TUS	6,598	49.76%	64
50	Pabiachhara	81.19%	Bidhu Bhusan Malakar	CPI(M)	7,544	50.6%	Subal Chandra Biswas	INC	6,413	43.02%	1,131
51	Fatikroy	86.31%	Tarani Mohan Singha	CPI(M)	7,580	51.65%	Radhika Ranjan Gupta	INC	5,898	40.19%	1,682
52	Chandipur	88.38%	Baidyanath Majumdar	CPI(M)	9,066	54.64%	Birajit Sinha	INC	7,398	44.59%	1,668
53	Kailashahar	83.9%	Syed Basit Ali	INC	8,116	50.82%	Tapan Chakraborty	CPI(M)	7,487	46.88%	629
54	Kurti	79.5%	Faizur Rahaman	CPI(M)	7,738	57.78%	Abdul Razak Bisharad	INC	4,794	35.79%	2,944
55	Kadamtala	76.63%	Samir Kumar Nath	CPI(M)	5,061	40.81%	Jyotirmoy Nath	INC	4,727	38.11%	334
56	Dharmanagar	79.09%	Amarendra Sarma	CPI(M)	7,309	51.59%	Binay Bhushan Ray	INC	5,570	39.31%	1,739
57	Jubarajnagar	84.5%	Ram Kumar Nath	CPI(M)	6,074	45.23%	Prasanna Kumar Nath	Independent	4,225	31.46%	1,849
58	Pencharthal	77.93%	Ratna Prava Das	Independent	5,343	34.84%	Mohan Lal Chakma	CPI(M)	5,000	32.6%	343
59	Panisagar	79.32%	Subodh Chandra Das	CPI(M)	6,642	53.45%	Bibekananda Chakraborty	Independent	3,047	24.52%	3,595
60	Kanchanpur	72.88%	Len Prasad Malsai	CPI(M)	6,052	43.21%	Drao Kumar Reang	TUS	4,321	30.85%	1,731

== Government Formation ==
The Communist Party of India (Marxist) (CPI(M)) won 37 out of 60 seats in the 60-seat Legislative Assembly. The Indian National Congress (INC) won 12 seats in the Legislative Assembly. Nripen Chakraborty of the CPI-M formed a government as Chief Minister.
