= 1988 Tripura Legislative Assembly election =

Indian state election

- 2 Feb 1988

60 seats in the Assembly 31 seats needed for a majority

	First party	Second party	Third party
Leader	Sudhir Ranjan Majumdar	-	-
Party	INC	CPI(M)	TUS
Leader's seat	Town Bordowali	-	-
Last election	12	37	6
Seats won	25	26	7
Seat change	▲13	▼11	▲1
Popular vote	424,241	520,697	119,599
Percentage	37.33%	45.82%	10.52%
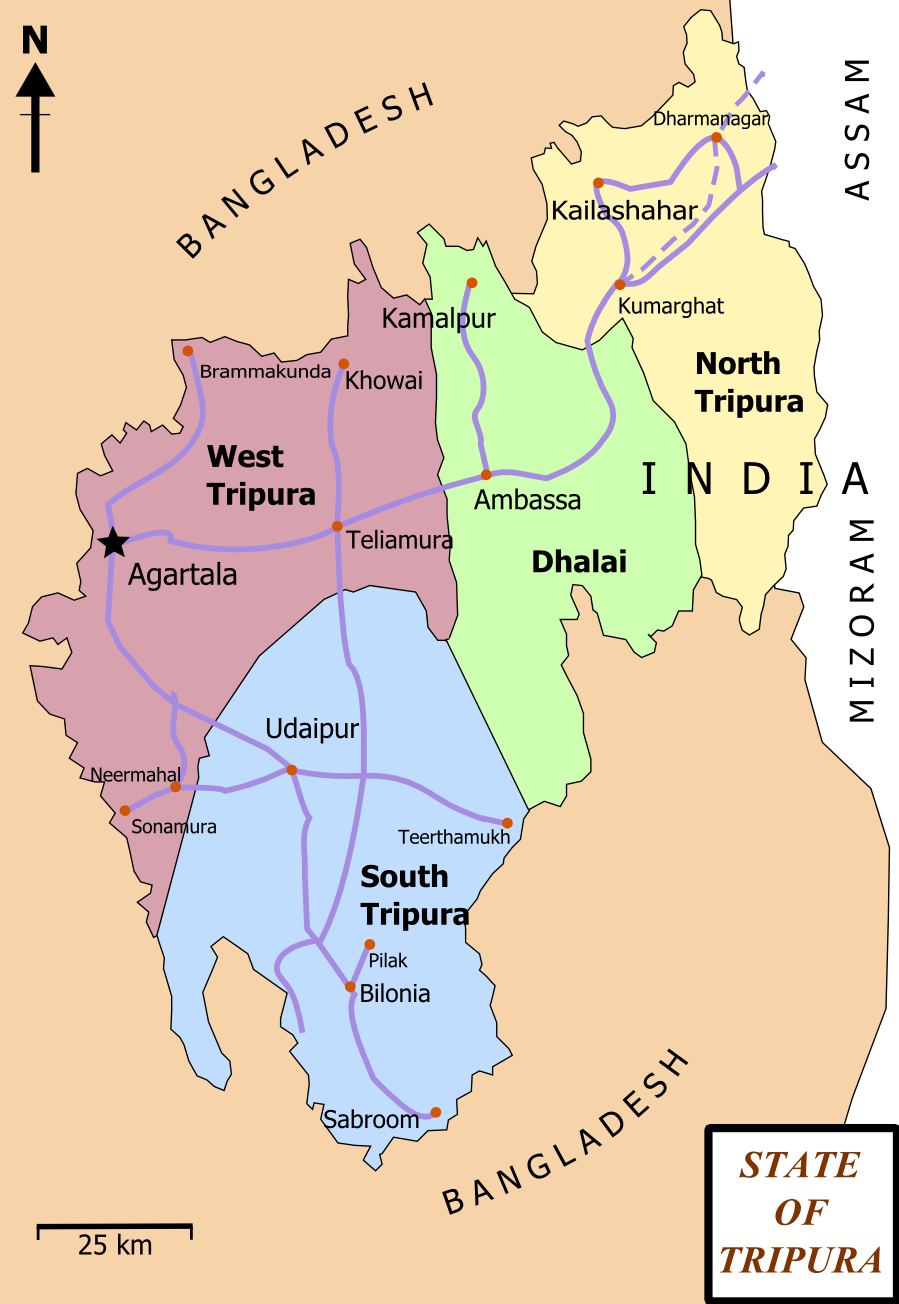
- Tripura District Map
Chief Minister before election
Nripen Chakraborty
CPI(M)
Elected Chief Minister
Sudhir Ranjan Majumdar
INC(I)

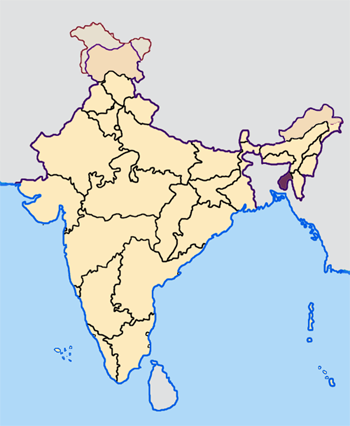
Tripura

The 1988 Tripura Legislative Assembly election took place in a single phase on 2 February 1988 to elect the Members of the Legislative Assembly (MLA) from each of the 60 Assembly Constituencies (ACs) in Tripura, India. More than 100 individuals were killed in election-related violence in the state of Tripura. Government and TNV representatives agreed to a cessation of military hostilities on August 12, 1988. Several thousand individuals were killed, and some 200,000 individuals were displaced during the conflict.

== Contesting parties ==
271 candidates registered to contest the election.

Party	Symbol	Alliance	Seats contested
Communist Party of India (Marxist) (CPI(M))		Left Front	55
Revolutionary Socialist Party (RSP)		Left Front	2
Communist Party of India (CPI)		Left Front	1
All India Forward Bloc (AIFB)		Left Front	1
Indian National Congress (INC)		Congress Alliance	46
Tripura Upajati Juba Samiti (TUJS)		Congress Alliance	14
Bharatiya Janata Party (BJP)			10
Janata Party			10
Independents (IND)			81
Total			271

== Highlights ==
Election to the Tripura Legislative Assembly were held on February 2, 1988. The election were held in a single phase for all the 60 assembly constituencies.

=== Participating Political Parties ===
==== National Parties ====
- BJP (Bharatiya Janata Party)
- CPI (Communist Party of India)
- CPM (Communist Party of India (Marxist))
- INC (Indian National Congress (I))
- JNP (Janata Party)

==== State Parties ====
- FBL (All India Forward Bloc)
- RSP (Revolutionary Socialist Party)
- TUS (Tripura Upajati Juba Samiti)

=== No. of constituencies ===
Type of Constituencies	GEN	SC	ST	Total
No. of Constituencies	36	7	17	60

=== Electors ===
	Men	Women	Total
No.of Electors	684,596	658,470	1,343,066
No.of Electors who Voted	590,887	560,771	1,151,658
Polling Percentage	86.31%	85.16%	85.75%

=== Performance of women candidates ===
	Men	Women	Total
No.of Contestants	268	3	271
Elected	58	02	60

== Result ==
=== Results by party ===
Party	Seats contested	Seats won	No. of votes	% of votes	1983 Seats
Communist Party of India (Marxist)	55	26	520,697	45.82%	37
Indian National Congress	46	25	424,241	37.33%	12
Tripura Upajati Juba Samiti	14	7	119,599	10.52%	6
Revolutionary Socialist Party	2	2	18,182	1.60%	2
Communist Party of India	1	0	9,314	0.82%	0
All India Forward Block	1	0	7,631	0.67%	0
Bharatiya Janata Party	10	0	1,757	0.15%	0
Janata Party	10	0	1,138	0.10%	0
Independents	81	0	33,846	2.98%	3
Total	220	60	1,136,405		
Source: ECI

=== Results by constituency ===
Winner, runner-up, voter turnout, and victory margin in every constituency
Assembly Constituency		Turnout	Winner				Runner Up				Margin
#k	Names	%	Candidate	Party	Votes	%	Candidate	Party	Votes	%	Margin
1	Simna	86.04%	Abhiram Debbarma	CPI(M)	10,318	60.67%	Rabindra Debbarma	TUS	6,605	38.84%	3,713
2	Mohanpur	84.32%	Dhirendra Chandra Debnath	INC	8,810	51.05%	Radharaman Debnath	CPI(M)	7,469	43.28%	1,341
3	Bamutia	86.75%	Prakash Chandra Das	INC	9,109	51.1%	Dilip Kumar Das	CPI(M)	8,636	48.45%	473
4	Barjala	85.85%	Dipak Kumar Roy	INC	11,889	53.53%	Gouri Bhattacharjee	CPI(M)	10,020	45.11%	1,869
5	Khayerpur	86.25%	Ratan Lal Ghosh	INC	10,910	50.99%	Pabitra Kar	CPI(M)	10,419	48.7%	491
6	Agartala	82.%	Maharani Bibhu Kumari Devi	INC	12,776	49.72%	Manik Sarkar	CPI(M)	12,695	49.4%	81
7	Ramnagar	83.8%	Surajit Datta	INC	10,663	51.79%	Khagen Das	CPI(M)	9,802	47.61%	861
8	Town Bordowali	81.35%	Sudhir Ranjan Majumdar	INC	10,308	57.03%	Brajagopal Roy	AIFB	7,631	42.22%	2,677
9	Banamalipur	82.43%	Ratan Chakraborty	INC	8,642	56.26%	Bibekananda Bhowmik	CPI(M)	6,612	43.04%	2,030
10	Majlishpur	86.34%	Dipak Nag	INC	9,493	50.61%	Manik Dey	CPI(M)	9,187	48.98%	306
11	Mandaibazar	79.65%	Rashiram Debbarma	CPI(M)	10,768	51.59%	Chandrodoy Rupini	TUS	9,898	47.42%	870
12	Takarjala	85.14%	Tarani Debbarma	CPI(M)	9,719	52.8%	Surya Kumar Debbarma	TUS	8,483	46.09%	1,236
13	Pratapgarh	85.36%	Anil Sarkar	CPI(M)	15,778	53.42%	Madhusudan Das	INC	13,492	45.68%	2,286
14	Badharghat	84.04%	Dilip Sarkar	INC	13,923	50.15%	Ila Bhattacharjee	CPI(M)	13,597	48.98%	326
15	Kamalasagar	87.31%	Matilal Sarkar	CPI(M)	9,487	51.51%	Deba Prasad Chowdhury	INC	8,702	47.25%	785
16	Bishalgarh	87.97%	Samir Ranjan Barman	INC	10,068	54.98%	Bhanu Lal Saha	CPI(M)	8,186	44.7%	1,882
17	Golaghati	83.65%	Budha Debbarma	TUS	9,141	48.58%	Niranjan Debbarma	CPI(M)	9,132	48.53%	9
18	Charilam	84.01%	Matilal Saha	INC	9,680	51.54%	Brajgopal Bhowmic	CPI(M)	8,772	46.71%	908
19	Boxanagar	91.32%	Billal Miah	INC	8,621	51.47%	Araber Rahaman	CPI(M)	8,089	48.29%	532
20	Nalchar	89.92%	Sukumar Barman	CPI(M)	9,420	52.73%	Narayan Das	INC	8,254	46.2%	1,166
21	Sonamura	89.29%	Rashik Lal Roy	INC	8,900	51.32%	Subal Rudra	CPI(M)	8,403	48.45%	497
22	Dhanpur	91.09%	Samar Chowdhury	CPI(M)	10,809	54.45%	Prabir Kumar Pul	INC	8,843	44.54%	1,966
23	Ramchandraghat	88.4%	Dasarath Deb	CPI(M)	11,306	78.18%	Sashi Kumar Debbarma	TUS	3,048	21.08%	8,258
24	Khowai	89.7%	Arun Kumar Kar	INC	7,657	49.67%	Samir Deb Sarkar	CPI(M)	7,544	48.93%	113
25	Asharambari	85.21%	Bidya Chandra Debbarma	CPI(M)	12,597	77.2%	Arun Kumar Debbarma	INC	3,211	19.68%	9,386
26	Pramodenagar	89.9%	Nirpen Chakraborty	CPI(M)	12,828	61.83%	Pradip Kumar Roy	INC	7,209	34.75%	5,619
27	Kalyanpur	87.64%	Makhan Lal Chakraborty	CPI(M)	8,275	49.65%	Kajal Chandra Das	INC	7,528	45.16%	747
28	Krishnapur	81.76%	Khagendra Jamatia	CPI(M)	9,861	57.78%	Karna Singh Jamatia	TUS	6,922	40.56%	2,939
29	Teliamura	84.44%	Jitendra Sarkar	CPI(M)	9,502	48.77%	Ashok Kumar Baidya	INC	9,111	46.77%	391
30	Bagma	86.86%	Rati Mohan Jamaitia	TUS	10,309	55.74%	Gunapada Jamatia	CPI(M)	8,046	43.51%	2,263
31	Salgarh	88.54%	Gopal Chandra Das	RSP	9,578	51.27%	Kamini Kumar Das	INC	9,064	48.52%	514
32	Radhakishorpur	86.13%	Chitta Ranjan Saha	RSP	8,604	50.97%	Ranajit Singha Roy	INC	7,971	47.22%	633
33	Matarbari	87.29%	Kashiram Reang	INC	9,514	49.65%	Madhab Chandra Saha	CPI(M)	9,506	49.61%	8
34	Kakraban	88.21%	Kashab Chandra Majumder	CPI(M)	10,372	57.01%	Subrata Dhar	INC	7,670	42.16%	2,702
35	Rajnagar	90.58%	Nakul Das	CPI(M)	12,813	54.99%	Jogendra Das	INC	10,393	44.6%	2,420
36	Belonia	88.52%	Amal Mallik	INC	10,227	51.96%	Jitendra Lal Das	CPI	9,314	47.32%	913
37	Santirbazar	84.96%	Gouri Sankar Reang	TUS	11,582	51.88%	Manik Majumder	CPI(M)	10,470	46.9%	1,112
38	Hrishyamukh	90.83%	Badal Chowdhury	CPI(M)	11,479	54.46%	Debabrata Baidya	INC	9,539	45.26%	1,940
39	Jolaibari	87.08%	Brajamohan Jamatia	CPI(M)	7,800	49.75%	Brajamohan Tripura	INC	7,682	49.%	118
40	Manu	89.39%	Angju Mog	INC	11,832	50.12%	Jitendra Kumar Chowdhury	CPI(M)	11,663	49.4%	169
41	Sabroom	89.39%	Sunil Kumar Chowdhury	CPI(M)	10,605	51.05%	Manoranjan Debnath	INC	10,109	48.67%	496
42	Ampinagar	83.16%	Nagendra Jamatia	TUS	10,882	54.61%	Debabrata Koloy	Independent	8,792	44.12%	2,090
43	Birganj	83.42%	Jawhar Shaha	INC	11,801	53.41%	Shyamal Saha	CPI(M)	10,007	45.29%	1,794
44	Raima Valley	82.29%	Rabindra Debbarma	TUS	10,640	50.99%	Ram Kumar Debbarma	CPI(M)	10,225	49.01%	415
45	Kamalpur	89.82%	Bimal Singha	CPI(M)	8,021	52.88%	Saroj Kumar Chakraborty	INC	7,063	46.57%	958
46	Surma	88.35%	Rudreswar Das	CPI(M)	8,941	50.93%	Harendra Chandra Das	INC	8,152	46.44%	789
47	Salema	87.34%	Dinesh Debbarma	CPI(M)	9,047	49.59%	Mangal Prasad Debbarma	TUS	8,428	46.19%	619
48	Kulai	82.98%	Diba Chandra Hrangkhowl	TUS	10,047	50.34%	Subindra Debbarma	CPI(M)	9,584	48.02%	463
49	Chawamanu	82.27%	Purna Mohan Tripura	CPI(M)	9,323	56.57%	Shyama Charan Tripura	TUS	7,157	43.43%	2,166
50	Pabiachhara	85.47%	Bidhu Bhusan Malakar	CPI(M)	9,388	50.34%	Jyotirmoy Malakar	INC	8,832	47.36%	556
51	Fatikroy	87.6%	Sunil Chandra Das	INC	12,288	72.14%	Bhudeb Bhattacharya	CPI(M)	4,299	25.24%	7,989
52	Chandipur	91.75%	Baidyanath Majumdar	CPI(M)	10,128	53.38%	Debasish Sen	INC	8,516	44.89%	1,612
53	Kailashahar	87.72%	Birajit Sinha	INC	9,519	50.88%	Tapan Chakraborty	CPI(M)	8,780	46.93%	739
54	Kurti	84.43%	Faizur Rahaman	CPI(M)	8,405	50.38%	Abdul Matin Chowdhury	INC	7,576	45.41%	829
55	Kadamtala	81.8%	Jyotirmoy Nath	INC	6,759	42.49%	Samir Kumar Nath	CPI(M)	6,317	39.71%	442
56	Dharmanagar	83.1%	Kalidas Dutta	INC	9,505	52.89%	Amarendra Sarma	CPI(M)	8,283	46.09%	1,222
57	Jubarajnagar	86.31%	Biva Rani Nath	INC	7,591	46.95%	Ram Kumar Nath	CPI(M)	7,400	45.77%	191
58	Pencharthal	79.89%	Sushil Kumar Chakma	INC	8,348	43.51%	Malendhan Chakma	CPI(M)	6,527	34.02%	1,821
59	Panisagar	81.07%	Subodh Chandra Das	CPI(M)	7,774	49.94%	Ashutosh Das	INC	6,491	41.69%	1,283
60	Kanchanpur	75.72%	Drao Kumar Reang	TUS	6,457	39.44%	Len Prasad Malsai	CPI(M)	6,263	38.25%	194

== Government formation ==
Indian National Congress (INC) – Tripura Upajati Juba Samiti (TUJS) coalition won 30 out of 60 seats in the Legislative Assembly. The CPI-M won 28 seats in the Legislative Assembly. Sudhir Ranjan Majumdar formed a INC-TUJS coalition government on February 5, 1988.

On February 17, 1992, the eight members of the Tripura Tribal Youth League (Tripura Upajati Juba Samiti-TUJS), who were part of the governing coalition in the 60-seat Legislative Assembly, resigned in protest over more than 500 starvation deaths in tribal areas in recent months. Chief Minister Sudhir Ranjan Majumdar resigned on February 19, 1992, and Samir Ranjan Barman was sworn in as Chief Minister of an INC-TUJS coalition government on February 20, 1992.

Chief Minister Samir Ranjan Barman resigned on February 27, 1993, and the state of Tripura was placed under president's rule from March 11, 1993 to April 10, 1993.
