= Kalyanpur, Tripura Assembly constituency =

Constituency of the Tripura legislative assembly in India

Kalyanpur
- Former constituency for the Tripura Legislative Assembly

Constituency details
- Country: India
- Region: Northeast India
- State: Tripura
- Established: 1963
- Abolished: 2008
- Total electors: 27,009

Kalyanpur Assembly constituency was an assembly constituency in the Indian state of Tripura.

== Members of the Legislative Assembly ==
Election	Member	Party
1967	Bidya Chandra Debbarma	Communist Party of India
1972	Bidya Chandra Debbarma	Communist Party of India
1977	Makhan Lal Chakraborty	Communist Party of India
1983	Makhan Lal Chakraborty	Communist Party of India
1988	Makhan Lal Chakraborty	Communist Party of India
1993	Makhan Lal Chakraborty	Communist Party of India
1998	Kajal Chandra Das	Independent politician
2003	Kajal Chandra Das	Indian National Congress
2008	Manindra Chandra Das	Communist Party of India

== Election results ==
=== Assembly Election 2008 ===
2008 Tripura Legislative Assembly election : Kalyanpur
Party	Candidate	Votes	%	±%
CPI(M)	Manindra Chandra Das	12,653	50.13%	▲5.30
INC	Kajal Chandra Das	11,791	46.72%	▼3.92
BJP	Harishankar Paul	311	1.23%	New
Independent	Manindra Das	243	0.96%	New
AMB	Subal Deb	240	0.95%	▼2.42
Margin of victory		862	3.42%	▼2.39
Turnout		25,238	93.75%	▲17.12
Registered electors		27,009		▲1.46
CPI(M) gain from INC		Swing	▼0.51	

=== Assembly Election 2003 ===
2003 Tripura Legislative Assembly election : Kalyanpur
Party	Candidate	Votes	%	±%
INC	Kajal Chandra Das	10,290	50.64%	▲47.71
CPI(M)	Manindra Chandra Das	9,110	44.83%	▲4.27
AMB	Keshab Majumder	684	3.37%	▲1.46
Independent	Bidhan Das	235	1.16%	New
Margin of victory		1,180	5.81%	▼5.14
Turnout		20,319	76.43%	▼3.11
Registered electors		26,621		▲9.52
INC gain from Independent		Swing	▼0.87	

=== Assembly Election 1998 ===
1998 Tripura Legislative Assembly election : Kalyanpur
Party	Candidate	Votes	%	±%
Independent	Kajal Chandra Das	9,946	51.51%	New
CPI(M)	Makhan Lal Chakraborty	7,832	40.56%	▼8.67
BJP	Rabindra Deb Nath	587	3.04%	New
INC	Dashu Ranjan Paul	567	2.94%	▼40.60
AMB	Keshab Majumder	369	1.91%	▼4.73
Margin of victory		2,114	10.95%	▲5.26
Turnout		19,309	81.35%	▼2.57
Registered electors		24,308		
Independent gain from CPI(M)		Swing	▲2.28	

=== Assembly Election 1993 ===
1993 Tripura Legislative Assembly election : Kalyanpur
Party	Candidate	Votes	%	±%
CPI(M)	Makhan Lal Chakraborty	9,832	49.23%	▼0.42
INC	Kajal Chandra Das	8,695	43.54%	▼1.63
AMB	Keshab Majumder	1,327	6.64%	New
Margin of victory		1,137	5.69%	▲1.21
Turnout		19,972	82.90%	▼4.67
Registered electors		24,354		
CPI(M) hold		Swing		

=== Assembly Election 1988 ===
1988 Tripura Legislative Assembly election : Kalyanpur
Party	Candidate	Votes	%	±%
CPI(M)	Makhan Lal Chakraborty	8,275	49.65%	▲0.65
INC	Kajal Chandra Das	7,528	45.16%	▲25.83
Independent	Keshav Majumder	865	5.19%	New
Margin of victory		747	4.48%	▼12.85
Turnout		16,668	87.64%	▲2.86
Registered electors		19,231		▲11.80
CPI(M) hold		Swing		

=== Assembly Election 1983 ===
1983 Tripura Legislative Assembly election : Kalyanpur
Party	Candidate	Votes	%	±%
CPI(M)	Makhan Lal Chakraborty	7,064	49.00%	▲7.73
Independent	Debabrata Datta	4,566	31.67%	New
INC	Suni Kishore Roy	2,787	19.33%	▼3.18
Margin of victory		2,498	17.33%	▼1.44
Turnout		14,417	84.93%	▲1.01
Registered electors		17,201		▲12.82
CPI(M) hold		Swing		

=== Assembly Election 1977 ===
1977 Tripura Legislative Assembly election : Kalyanpur
Party	Candidate	Votes	%	±%
CPI(M)	Makhan Lal Chakraborty	5,211	41.27%	▼36.09
INC	Ashoke Kumar Bhattacharya	2,842	22.51%	▼0.13
TPCC	Dhananjoy Singha	1,355	10.73%	New
TUS	Nilmani Singha	1,087	8.61%	New
Independent	Anil Chandra Roy	864	6.84%	New
Independent	Suresh Chandra Debnath	802	6.35%	New
Proutist Bloc, India	Bhupesh Chandra Debnath	243	1.92%	New
JP	Rajkumar Kamaljit Singh	168	1.33%	New
Margin of victory		2,369	18.76%	▼35.96
Turnout		12,626	83.94%	▼0.05
Registered electors		15,247		▼4.85
CPI(M) hold		Swing	▼36.09	

=== Assembly Election 1972 ===
1972 Tripura Legislative Assembly election : Kalyanpur
Party	Candidate	Votes	%	±%
CPI(M)	Bidya Chandra Debbarma	10,273	77.36%	▲14.79
INC	Krishna Kumar Debbarma	3,006	22.64%	▼14.79
Margin of victory		7,267	54.73%	▲29.58
Turnout		13,279	84.55%	▼4.68
Registered electors		16,025		▼38.74
CPI(M) hold		Swing		

=== Assembly Election 1967 ===
1967 Tripura Legislative Assembly election : Kalyanpur
Party	Candidate	Votes	%	±%
CPI(M)	Bidya Chandra Debbarma	14,330	62.57%	New
INC	N. K. D. Barma	8,572	37.43%	New
Margin of victory		5,758	25.14%	
Turnout		22,902	89.71%	
Registered electors		26,161		
CPI(M) win (new seat)				
