= Kurti Assembly constituency =

Constituency of the Tripura legislative assembly in India

Kurti
- Former constituency for the Tripura Legislative Assembly

Constituency details
- Country: India
- Region: Northeast India
- State: Tripura
- Established: 1977
- Abolished: 2008
- Total electors: 32,164

Kurti Assembly constituency was an assembly constituency in the Indian state of Tripura.

== Members of the Legislative Assembly ==
Election	Member	Party
1977	Faizur Rahaman	Communist Party of India
1983	Faizur Rahaman	Communist Party of India
1988	Faizur Rahaman	Communist Party of India
1993	Faizur Rahaman	Communist Party of India
1998	Faizur Rahaman	Communist Party of India
2003	Faizur Rahaman	Communist Party of India
2008	Faizur Rahaman	Communist Party of India

== Election results ==
=== Assembly Election 2008 ===
2008 Tripura Legislative Assembly election : Kurti
Party	Candidate	Votes	%	±%
CPI(M)	Faizur Rahaman	14,337	49.79%	▼0.62
Independent	Abdul Matin Chowdhury	11,109	38.58%	New
INC	Nurul Haque	1,796	6.24%	▼40.09
Independent	Md. Abdul Rob	544	1.89%	New
BJP	Sankar Kodal	527	1.83%	New
CPI(ML)L	Nikhil Roy	318	1.10%	▲0.41
AITC	Md. Farman Ali	164	0.57%	▼0.36
Margin of victory		3,228	11.21%	▲7.13
Turnout		28,795	89.58%	▲8.21
Registered electors		32,164		▲5.51
CPI(M) hold		Swing	▼0.62	

=== Assembly Election 2003 ===
2003 Tripura Legislative Assembly election : Kurti
Party	Candidate	Votes	%	±%
CPI(M)	Faizur Rahaman	12,495	50.41%	▲6.22
INC	Abdul Matin Chowdhury	11,484	46.33%	▲2.98
JD(U)	Abdul Rup	406	1.64%	New
AITC	Murtaza Uddin Chowdhury	231	0.93%	New
CPI(ML)L	Arabinda Teli	171	0.69%	▲0.13
Margin of victory		1,011	4.08%	▲3.25
Turnout		24,787	81.37%	▲1.27
Registered electors		30,483		▲13.51
CPI(M) hold		Swing	▲6.22	

=== Assembly Election 1998 ===
1998 Tripura Legislative Assembly election : Kurti
Party	Candidate	Votes	%	±%
CPI(M)	Faizur Rahaman	9,498	44.19%	▼8.70
INC	Abdul Matin Chowdhury	9,319	43.35%	▲18.17
BJP	Nikhil Chandra Das	2,558	11.90%	▼6.42
CPI(ML)L	Himani Nath	120	0.56%	New
Margin of victory		179	0.83%	▼26.87
Turnout		21,495	81.59%	▲4.82
Registered electors		26,854		
CPI(M) hold		Swing	▼8.70	

=== Assembly Election 1993 ===
1993 Tripura Legislative Assembly election : Kurti
Party	Candidate	Votes	%	±%
CPI(M)	Faizur Rahaman	10,352	52.89%	▲2.51
INC	Abdul Rokib	4,929	25.18%	▼20.23
BJP	Nikihil Das	3,586	18.32%	New
IPF	Man Kumar Singha	387	1.98%	New
Independent	Abdul Rafique	139	0.71%	New
Margin of victory		5,423	27.71%	▲22.74
Turnout		19,573	76.31%	▼7.86
Registered electors		26,020		
CPI(M) hold		Swing	▲2.51	

=== Assembly Election 1988 ===
1988 Tripura Legislative Assembly election : Kurti
Party	Candidate	Votes	%	±%
CPI(M)	Faizur Rahaman	8,405	50.38%	▼7.40
INC	Abdul Matin Chowdhury	7,576	45.41%	▲9.62
Independent	Man Kumar Singha	524	3.14%	New
Independent	Dhirendra Kumar Dey	178	1.07%	New
Margin of victory		829	4.97%	▼17.01
Turnout		16,683	84.43%	▲4.93
Registered electors		20,080		▲17.17
CPI(M) hold		Swing	▼7.40	

=== Assembly Election 1983 ===
1983 Tripura Legislative Assembly election : Kurti
Party	Candidate	Votes	%	±%
CPI(M)	Faizur Rahaman	7,738	57.78%	▲9.49
INC	Abdul Razak Bisharad	4,794	35.79%	▲27.52
Independent	Abdul Wazid	641	4.79%	New
BJP	Ardhendu Nag	179	1.34%	New
Margin of victory		2,944	21.98%	▼15.48
Turnout		13,393	79.50%	▲3.28
Registered electors		17,137		▲12.64
CPI(M) hold		Swing	▲9.49	

=== Assembly Election 1977 ===
1977 Tripura Legislative Assembly election : Kurti
Party	Candidate	Votes	%	±%
CPI(M)	Faizur Rahaman	5,500	48.28%	New
JP	Gopendra Kumar Das	1,233	10.82%	New
Independent	Lonath Tantubay	1,169	10.26%	New
Independent	Ramtanu Bhattacharjee	1,155	10.14%	New
INC	Abdul Rahim	943	8.28%	New
Independent	Charitra Mohan Sarkar	834	7.32%	New
TPCC	Benoy Bhushan Banerjee	284	2.49%	New
Independent	Sashi Kumar Singha	273	2.40%	New
Margin of victory		4,267	37.46%	
Turnout		11,391	76.51%	
Registered electors		15,214		
CPI(M) win (new seat)				
