= Kulai Assembly constituency =

Constituency of the Tripura legislative assembly in India

Kulai
- Former constituency for the Tripura Legislative Assembly

Constituency details
- Country: India
- Region: Northeast India
- State: Tripura
- Established: 1977
- Abolished: 2008
- Total electors: 35,209

Kulai Assembly constituency was an assembly constituency in the India state of Tripura.

== Members of the Legislative Assembly ==
Election	Member	Party
1977	Kamini Debbarma	Communist Party of India
1983	Diba Chandra Harangkhal	Tripura Upajati Juba Samiti
1988	Diba Chandra Hrangkhowl	Tripura Upajati Juba Samiti
1993	Hasmai Reang	Communist Party of India
1998	Bijoy Kumar Hrangkhawl	Independent politician
2003	Bijoy Kumar Hrangkhawl	Indigenous Nationalist Party of Twipra
2008	Bijoy Kumar Harngkhawl	Indigenous Nationalist Party of Twipra

== Election results ==
=== Assembly Election 2008 ===
2008 Tripura Legislative Assembly election : Kulai
Party	Candidate	Votes	%	±%
INPT	Bijoy Kumar Harngkhawl	14,944	46.87%	▼8.20
CPI(M)	Sabitri Debbarma	14,829	46.51%	▲8.60
BJP	Kalpa Mohan Tripura	877	2.75%	▼2.13
Independent	Rajyaram Tripura	761	2.39%	New
LJP	Padhya Kumar Debbarma	472	1.48%	New
Margin of victory		115	0.36%	▼16.80
Turnout		31,883	90.72%	▲19.10
Registered electors		35,209		▲8.48
INPT hold		Swing	▼8.20	

=== Assembly Election 2003 ===
2003 Tripura Legislative Assembly election : Kulai
Party	Candidate	Votes	%	±%
INPT	Bijoy Kumar Hrangkhawl	12,772	55.07%	New
CPI(M)	Bijoy Kumar Debbarma	8,792	37.91%	▼2.01
BJP	Jogendra Debbarma	1,132	4.88%	▼3.63
NCP	Basistha Debbarma	495	2.13%	New
Margin of victory		3,980	17.16%	▲6.90
Turnout		23,191	71.53%	▼0.75
Registered electors		32,456		▲13.31
INPT gain from Independent		Swing	▲4.89	

=== Assembly Election 1998 ===
1998 Tripura Legislative Assembly election : Kulai
Party	Candidate	Votes	%	±%
Independent	Bijoy Kumar Hrangkhawl	10,377	50.18%	New
CPI(M)	Gitya Kumar Reang	8,255	39.92%	▼17.70
BJP	Chenjakdhan Tripura	1,760	8.51%	▲6.77
AMB	Chandramani Debbarma	288	1.39%	▲0.11
Margin of victory		2,122	10.26%	▼14.94
Turnout		20,680	74.72%	▼4.65
Registered electors		28,643		
Independent gain from CPI(M)		Swing	▼7.44	

=== Assembly Election 1993 ===
1993 Tripura Legislative Assembly election : Kulai
Party	Candidate	Votes	%	±%
CPI(M)	Hasmai Reang	13,010	57.61%	▲9.59
TUS	Diba Chandra Hiangkhwal	7,319	32.41%	▼17.93
Independent	Kartik Kumar Kalai	1,347	5.97%	New
BJP	Kamana Tripura	393	1.74%	New
AMB	Chandramani Debbarma	289	1.28%	New
Independent	Santan Malsom	223	0.99%	New
Margin of victory		5,691	25.20%	▲22.88
Turnout		22,581	78.17%	▼4.75
Registered electors		29,384		
CPI(M) gain from TUS		Swing	▲7.27	

=== Assembly Election 1988 ===
1988 Tripura Legislative Assembly election : Kulai
Party	Candidate	Votes	%	±%
TUS	Diba Chandra Hrangkhowl	10,047	50.34%	▼0.44
CPI(M)	Subindra Debbarma	9,584	48.02%	▲2.91
Independent	Parimal Chowdhury	231	1.16%	New
Margin of victory		463	2.32%	▼3.34
Turnout		19,957	82.98%	▲3.94
Registered electors		24,458		▲14.56
TUS hold		Swing		

=== Assembly Election 1983 ===
1983 Tripura Legislative Assembly election : Kulai
Party	Candidate	Votes	%	±%
TUS	Diba Chandra Harangkhal	8,419	50.78%	▲32.89
CPI(M)	Kamini Debbarma	7,480	45.12%	▼1.23
Independent	Ratna Prava Das	680	4.10%	New
Margin of victory		939	5.66%	▼20.27
Turnout		16,579	78.96%	▲2.52
Registered electors		21,349		▲22.87
TUS gain from CPI(M)		Swing		

=== Assembly Election 1977 ===
1977 Tripura Legislative Assembly election : Kulai
Party	Candidate	Votes	%	±%
CPI(M)	Kamini Debbarma	6,050	46.34%	New
INC	Prafulla Roaja	2,664	20.41%	New
TUS	Bijoy Kumar Hrangkhal	2,336	17.89%	New
JP	Gopinath Tripura	1,277	9.78%	New
TPCC	Padma Kumar Rankhal	728	5.58%	New
Margin of victory		3,386	25.94%	
Turnout		13,055	76.70%	
Registered electors		17,375		
CPI(M) win (new seat)				
