= Birganj Assembly constituency =

Constituency of the Tripura legislative assembly in India

Birganj
- Former constituency for the Tripura Legislative Assembly

Constituency details
- Country: India
- Region: Northeast India
- State: Tripura
- Established: 1963
- Abolished: 2008
- Total electors: 36,751

Birganj Assembly constituency was an assembly constituency in the Indian state of Tripura.

== Members of the Legislative Assembly ==
Election	Member	Party
1967	B. B. Riyan	Indian National Congress
1972	Sushil Ranjan Saha	Indian National Congress
1977	Syamal Saha	Communist Party of India
1983	Jawhar Saha	Independent politician
1988	Jawhar Shaha	Indian National Congress
1993	Ranjit Debnath	Communist Party of India
1998	Jawahar Shaha	Indian National Congress
2003	Ranjit Debnath	Communist Party of India
2008	Manoranjan Acharjee	Communist Party of India

== Election results ==
=== Assembly Election 2008 ===
2008 Tripura Legislative Assembly election : Birganj
Party	Candidate	Votes	%	±%
CPI(M)	Manoranjan Acharjee	18,262	52.05%	▼2.54
INC	Jawhar Saha	15,607	44.48%	▲0.74
Independent	Hemanto Uchoi	514	1.46%	New
BJP	Haradhan Saha	420	1.20%	New
CPI(ML)L	Rajjab Ali	283	0.81%	New
Margin of victory		2,655	7.57%	▼3.28
Turnout		35,086	95.62%	▲11.96
Registered electors		36,751		▲2.72
CPI(M) hold		Swing	▼2.54	

=== Assembly Election 2003 ===
2003 Tripura Legislative Assembly election : Birganj
Party	Candidate	Votes	%	±%
CPI(M)	Ranjit Debnath	16,310	54.59%	▲6.34
INC	Jawhar Shaha	13,070	43.74%	▼6.20
AMB	Ratan Roy	499	1.67%	New
Margin of victory		3,240	10.84%	▲9.15
Turnout		29,879	83.67%	▲1.47
Registered electors		35,779		▲8.25
CPI(M) gain from INC		Swing	▲4.64	

=== Assembly Election 1998 ===
1998 Tripura Legislative Assembly election : Birganj
Party	Candidate	Votes	%	±%
INC	Jawahar Shaha	13,543	49.94%	▲7.66
CPI(M)	Ranjit Debnath	13,084	48.25%	▼0.39
BJP	Ajoy Kanti Saha	418	1.54%	▲0.22
Margin of victory		459	1.69%	▼4.65
Turnout		27,117	83.42%	▼2.43
Registered electors		33,053		
INC gain from CPI(M)		Swing		

=== Assembly Election 1993 ===
1993 Tripura Legislative Assembly election : Birganj
Party	Candidate	Votes	%	±%
CPI(M)	Ranjit Debnath	12,704	48.64%	▲3.34
INC	Jawhar Shaha	11,046	42.29%	▼11.12
Independent	Prabodh Bhattacharjee	1,367	5.23%	New
BJP	Dilip Barman	344	1.32%	New
AMB	Gourisankar Nandy	240	0.92%	New
Independent	Dhirendra Chandra Das	187	0.72%	New
Independent	Talkudar Reang	141	0.54%	New
Margin of victory		1,658	6.35%	▼1.77
Turnout		26,121	85.51%	▲2.15
Registered electors		30,924		
CPI(M) gain from INC		Swing	▼4.78	

=== Assembly Election 1988 ===
1988 Tripura Legislative Assembly election : Birganj
Party	Candidate	Votes	%	±%
INC	Jawhar Shaha	11,801	53.41%	▲51.21
CPI(M)	Shyamal Saha	10,007	45.29%	▲10.04
Independent	Narayan Paul	286	1.29%	New
Margin of victory		1,794	8.12%	▼5.17
Turnout		22,094	83.42%	▲3.72
Registered electors		26,841		▲17.07
INC gain from Independent		Swing		

=== Assembly Election 1983 ===
1983 Tripura Legislative Assembly election : Birganj
Party	Candidate	Votes	%	±%
Independent	Jawhar Saha	8,747	48.54%	New
CPI(M)	Syjmal Kanti Saha	6,352	35.25%	▼4.24
Independent	Anil Devnath	2,523	14.00%	New
INC	Lal Mohan Ghosh	397	2.20%	▼26.75
Margin of victory		2,395	13.29%	▲2.75
Turnout		18,019	79.77%	▲2.41
Registered electors		22,927		▲20.08
Independent gain from CPI(M)		Swing	▲9.05	

=== Assembly Election 1977 ===
1977 Tripura Legislative Assembly election : Birganj
Party	Candidate	Votes	%	±%
CPI(M)	Syamal Saha	5,745	39.50%	▼0.68
INC	Kanai Lal Sarkar	4,212	28.96%	▼17.65
TUS	Dusmanta Reang	3,300	22.69%	New
JP	Susil Ranjan Saha	1,103	7.58%	New
TPCC	Benoy Bhushan Ray	126	0.87%	New
Margin of victory		1,533	10.54%	▲4.11
Turnout		14,546	77.90%	▲12.14
Registered electors		19,093		▲56.35
CPI(M) gain from INC		Swing	▼7.11	

=== Assembly Election 1972 ===
1972 Tripura Legislative Assembly election : Birganj
Party	Candidate	Votes	%	±%
INC	Sushil Ranjan Saha	3,645	46.61%	▼8.88
CPI(M)	Syamal Kantisaha	3,142	40.17%	▲0.96
Independent	Anil Chandra Dhar Roy	943	12.06%	New
Independent	Murari Mohan Das	91	1.16%	New
Margin of victory		503	6.43%	▼9.84
Turnout		7,821	66.57%	▲2.68
Registered electors		12,212		▼32.41
INC hold		Swing	▼8.88	

=== Assembly Election 1967 ===
1967 Tripura Legislative Assembly election : Birganj
Party	Candidate	Votes	%	±%
INC	B. B. Riyan	6,152	55.49%	New
CPI(M)	R. K. D. Barma	4,348	39.22%	New
ABJS	R. L. D. Barma	587	5.29%	New
Margin of victory		1,804	16.27%	
Turnout		11,087	64.36%	
Registered electors		18,068		
INC win (new seat)				
