= Salema Assembly constituency =

Constituency of the Tripura legislative assembly in India

Coordinates: 24.01°N 91.83°E

Salema
- Former constituency for the Tripura Legislative Assembly

Constituency details
- Country: India
- Region: Northeast India
- State: Tripura
- Established: 1977
- Abolished: 2008
- Total electors: 29,114

Salema was an assembly constituency in the Indian state of Tripura.

== Members of the Legislative Assembly ==
Election	Member	Party
1977	Dinesh Debbarma	Communist Party of India
1983	Dinesh Debbarma	Communist Party of India
1988	Dinesh Debbarma	Communist Party of India
1993	Prasanta Debbarma	Communist Party of India
1998	Prasanta Debbarma	Communist Party of India
2003	Prasanta Debbarma	Communist Party of India
2008	Prasanta Debbarma	Communist Party of India

== Election results ==
=== Assembly Election 2008 ===
2008 Tripura Legislative Assembly election : Salema
Party	Candidate	Votes	%	±%
CPI(M)	Prasanta Debbarma	14,354	54.17%	▼4.85
INC	Jadu Mohan Tripura	10,559	39.85%	New
BJP	Mahendra Debbarma	605	2.28%	New
Independent	Radha Charan Debbarma	595	2.25%	New
AIFB	Bipul Debbarma	222	0.84%	New
LJP	Bishu Debbarma	164	0.62%	New
Margin of victory		3,795	14.32%	▼7.11
Turnout		26,499	91.28%	▲10.48
Registered electors		29,114		▲6.40
CPI(M) hold		Swing	▼4.85	

=== Assembly Election 2003 ===
2003 Tripura Legislative Assembly election : Salema
Party	Candidate	Votes	%	±%
CPI(M)	Prasanta Debbarma	13,007	59.02%	▲6.45
INPT	Ajit Debbarma	8,285	37.59%	New
AMB	Jyotsnamoy Dewan	746	3.39%	▲2.29
Margin of victory		4,722	21.43%	▲8.85
Turnout		22,038	80.71%	▲1.83
Registered electors		27,362		▲13.27
CPI(M) hold		Swing	▲6.45	

=== Assembly Election 1998 ===
1998 Tripura Legislative Assembly election : Salema
Party	Candidate	Votes	%	±%
CPI(M)	Prasanta Debbarma	9,996	52.57%	▼9.33
TUS	Sachindra Debbarma	7,604	39.99%	▲10.03
BJP	Haimanti Debbarma	1,205	6.34%	New
AMB	Ranita Sangma	209	1.10%	▼3.61
Margin of victory		2,392	12.58%	▼19.37
Turnout		19,014	80.99%	▼2.38
Registered electors		24,156		
CPI(M) hold		Swing	▼9.33	

=== Assembly Election 1993 ===
1993 Tripura Legislative Assembly election : Salema
Party	Candidate	Votes	%	±%
CPI(M)	Prasanta Debbarma	12,683	61.90%	▲12.32
TUS	Mangal Prasad Debbarma	6,138	29.96%	▼16.23
AMB	Ranita Sangma	965	4.71%	New
Independent	Gupta Narayan Debbarma	626	3.06%	New
Margin of victory		6,545	31.95%	▲28.55
Turnout		20,488	81.98%	▼5.20
Registered electors		25,264		
CPI(M) hold		Swing	▲12.32	

=== Assembly Election 1988 ===
1988 Tripura Legislative Assembly election : Salema
Party	Candidate	Votes	%	±%
CPI(M)	Dinesh Debbarma	9,047	49.59%	▼2.06
TUS	Mangal Prasad Debbarma	8,428	46.19%	▲2.72
Independent	Parimal Chowdhury	729	4.00%	New
Margin of victory		619	3.39%	▼4.78
Turnout		18,245	87.34%	▲2.95
Registered electors		21,142		▲13.31
CPI(M) hold		Swing		

=== Assembly Election 1983 ===
1983 Tripura Legislative Assembly election : Salema
Party	Candidate	Votes	%	±%
CPI(M)	Dinesh Debbarma	8,032	51.65%	▼1.59
TUS	Bijoy Kumar Jamatia	6,761	43.48%	New
Independent	Ratna Prava Das	758	4.87%	New
Margin of victory		1,271	8.17%	▼19.55
Turnout		15,551	84.50%	▲3.94
Registered electors		18,659		▲14.49
CPI(M) hold		Swing		

=== Assembly Election 1977 ===
1977 Tripura Legislative Assembly election : Salema
Party	Candidate	Votes	%	±%
CPI(M)	Dinesh Debbarma	6,890	53.24%	New
INC	Madan Mohan Debbarma	3,302	25.52%	New
TPCC	Binanda Kishore Debbarma	1,567	12.11%	New
CPI	Dharmaroy Debbarma	871	6.73%	New
JP	Mangal Chandra Debbarma	241	1.86%	New
Independent	Himangshu Daring	70	0.54%	New
Margin of victory		3,588	27.73%	
Turnout		12,941	81.29%	
Registered electors		16,297		
CPI(M) win (new seat)				
