= Salgarh Assembly constituency =

Constituency of the Tripura legislative assembly in India

Salgarh
- Former constituency for the Tripura Legislative Assembly

Constituency details
- Country: India
- Region: Northeast India
- State: Tripura
- Established: 1963
- Abolished: 2008
- Total electors: 32,822

Salgarh Assembly constituency was an assembly constituency in the Indian state of Tripura.

== Members of the Legislative Assembly ==
Election	Member	Party
1967	E. A. Chowdhury	Indian National Congress
1972	Tapash Dey	Indian National Congress
1977	Gopal Chandra Das	Revolutionary Socialist Party
1983	Gopal Chandra Das	Revolutionary Socialist Party
1988	Gopal Chandra Das	Revolutionary Socialist Party
1993	Gopal Chandra Das	Revolutionary Socialist Party
1998	Gopal Chandra Das	Revolutionary Socialist Party
2003	Gopal Chandra Das	Revolutionary Socialist Party
2008	Partha Das	Revolutionary Socialist Party

== Election results ==
=== Assembly Election 2008 ===
2008 Tripura Legislative Assembly election : Salgarh
Party	Candidate	Votes	%	±%
RSP	Partha Das	17,235	55.60%	▼2.70
INC	Mira Das	12,284	39.63%	▲0.25
CPI(ML)L	Sukhen Chandra Sarkar	626	2.02%	▲0.95
BJP	Rabindra Kumar Das	530	1.71%	New
NCP	Uttam Das	322	1.04%	New
Margin of victory		4,951	15.97%	▼2.95
Turnout		30,997	94.62%	▲10.21
Registered electors		32,822		▲2.30
RSP hold		Swing	▼2.70	

=== Assembly Election 2003 ===
2003 Tripura Legislative Assembly election : Salgarh
Party	Candidate	Votes	%	±%
RSP	Gopal Chandra Das	15,756	58.30%	▲5.30
INC	Mira Das	10,643	39.38%	▼4.38
CPI(ML)L	Narayan Das (Murapara)	288	1.07%	New
Independent	Narayan Das (Palatana)	233	0.86%	New
Margin of victory		5,113	18.92%	▲9.69
Turnout		27,024	84.27%	▲1.66
Registered electors		32,085		▲14.73
RSP hold		Swing	▲5.30	

=== Assembly Election 1998 ===
1998 Tripura Legislative Assembly election : Salgarh
Party	Candidate	Votes	%	±%
RSP	Gopal Chandra Das	12,238	53.00%	▲2.03
INC	Chandra Mohan Biswas	10,106	43.77%	▼1.76
BJP	Rabindra Kumar Das	703	3.04%	▲0.07
Margin of victory		2,132	9.23%	▲3.79
Turnout		23,090	84.28%	▼1.15
Registered electors		27,965		
RSP hold		Swing		

=== Assembly Election 1993 ===
1993 Tripura Legislative Assembly election : Salgarh
Party	Candidate	Votes	%	±%
RSP	Gopal Chandra Das	11,286	50.97%	▼0.30
INC	Kamini Kumar Das	10,080	45.52%	▼3.00
BJP	Rabindra Kumar Das	658	2.97%	New
Margin of victory		1,206	5.45%	▲2.70
Turnout		22,142	84.74%	▼3.85
Registered electors		26,448		
RSP hold		Swing		

=== Assembly Election 1988 ===
1988 Tripura Legislative Assembly election : Salgarh
Party	Candidate	Votes	%	±%
RSP	Gopal Chandra Das	9,578	51.27%	▼1.94
INC	Kamini Kumar Das	9,064	48.52%	▲2.60
Margin of victory		514	2.75%	▼4.54
Turnout		18,680	88.54%	▲1.77
Registered electors		21,331		▲19.53
RSP hold		Swing		

=== Assembly Election 1983 ===
1983 Tripura Legislative Assembly election : Salgarh
Party	Candidate	Votes	%	±%
RSP	Gopal Chandra Das	8,148	53.21%	▼7.11
INC	Kamini Kumar Das	7,032	45.92%	▲31.90
Margin of victory		1,116	7.29%	▼39.01
Turnout		15,312	87.11%	▲4.95
Registered electors		17,846		▲24.90
RSP hold		Swing		

=== Assembly Election 1977 ===
1977 Tripura Legislative Assembly election : Salgarh
Party	Candidate	Votes	%	±%
RSP	Gopal Chandra Das	6,968	60.32%	New
INC	Jitendra Chandra Das	1,620	14.02%	▼34.65
TPCC	Kamini Kumar Das	1,478	12.79%	New
Independent	Sailesh Chandra Majumdar	1,119	9.69%	New
JP	Gobinda Roy Chowdhury	217	1.88%	New
Independent	Maran Chandra Das	150	1.30%	New
Margin of victory		5,348	46.30%	▲33.30
Turnout		11,552	82.49%	▲14.04
Registered electors		14,288		▲17.14
RSP gain from INC		Swing	▲11.65	

=== Assembly Election 1972 ===
1972 Tripura Legislative Assembly election : Salgarh
Party	Candidate	Votes	%	±%
INC	Tapash Dey	3,966	48.67%	▼22.42
CPI(M)	Abani Mohan Bhowmik	2,907	35.67%	▲15.97
Independent	Biswambar Debnath	1,276	15.66%	New
Margin of victory		1,059	13.00%	▼38.39
Turnout		8,149	69.29%	▼5.76
Registered electors		12,197		▼25.30
INC hold		Swing		

=== Assembly Election 1967 ===
1967 Tripura Legislative Assembly election : Salgarh
Party	Candidate	Votes	%	±%
INC	E. A. Chowdhury	8,424	71.09%	New
CPI(M)	N. C. Ghose	2,335	19.70%	New
Independent	N. R. Chanda	1,091	9.21%	New
Margin of victory		6,089	51.38%	
Turnout		11,850	74.80%	
Registered electors		16,329		
INC win (new seat)				
