= 2008 Tripura Legislative Assembly election =

Indian state assembly election

- 23 Feb 2008

60 seats in the Assembly 31 seats needed for a majority
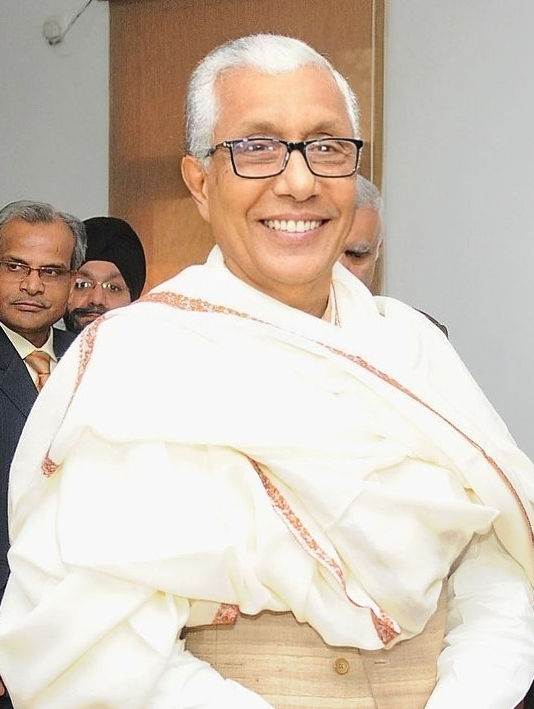

	First party	Second party
Leader	Manik Sarkar	Samir Ranjan Barman
Party	CPI(M)	INC
Leader's seat	Dhanpur	Bishalgarh
Seats before	38	13
Seats won	46	10
Seat change	▲8	▼3
Popular vote	903,009	684,207
Percentage	48.01%	36.38%
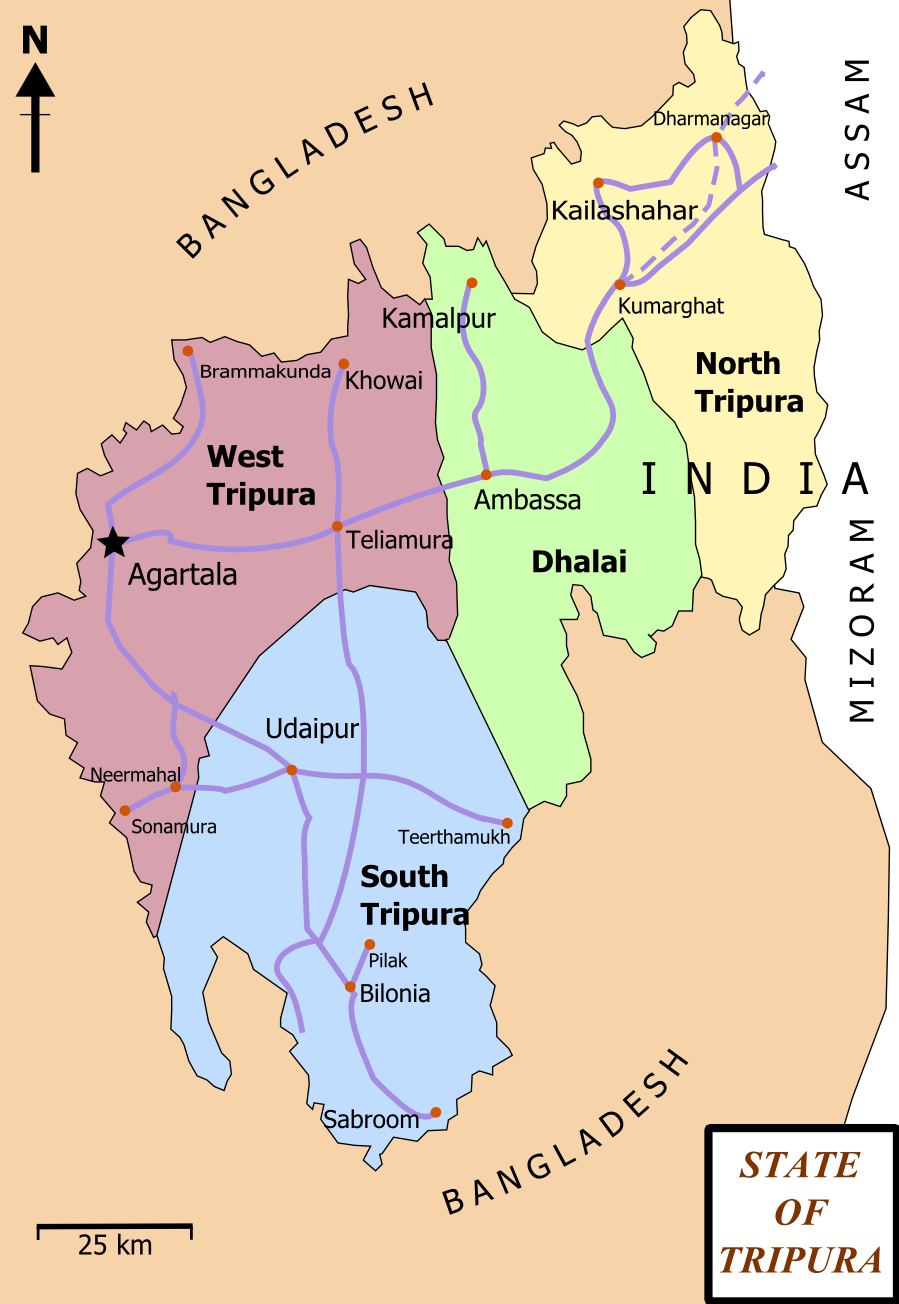
- Tripura District Map
Chief Minister before election
Manik Sarkar
CPI(M)
Elected Chief Minister
Manik Sarkar
CPI(M)

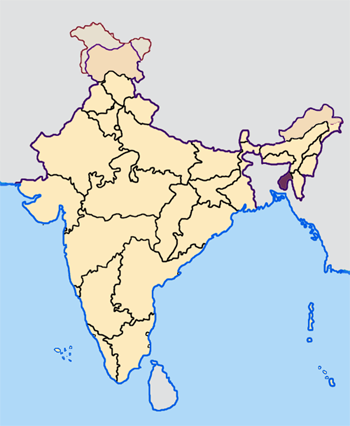
Tripura

The 2008 Tripura Legislative Assembly election took place in a single phase on 23 February to elect the Members of the Legislative Assembly (MLA) from each of the 60 Assembly Constituencies in Tripura, India. The votes were counted on 7 March 2008, with the use of electronic voting machines (EVMs). The results were ready within the day.

The Communist Party of India (Marxist) (CPI(M))-led alliance, the Left Front, retained control of the Assembly by winning 49 seats and securing a more than a two-thirds majority. This provided the CPI(M) with a fourth consecutive governing term.

CPI(M) leader Manik Sarkar was sworn in as the Chief Minister of Tripura for the fourth time on 10 March 2008 along with 11 cabinet Ministers.

== Contesting parties ==
312 candidates registered to contest the election.

Party	Symbol	Alliance	Seats contested
Communist Party of India (Marxist) (CPI(M))		Left Front	56
Communist Party of India (CPI)		Left Front	2
Revolutionary Socialist Party (RSP)		Left Front	2
All India Forward Bloc (AIFB)		Left Front (contested alone)	12
Indian National Congress (INC)		UPA	48
Bharatiya Janata Party (BJP)		NDA	49
All India Trinamool Congress			22
Amra Bangali			19
Communist Party of India (Marxist–Leninist) Liberation			14
Indigenous Nationalist Party of Twipra (INPT)			11
Lok Janshakti Party		UPA	8
Nationalist Congress Party		UPA	5
Janata Dal (United)		NDA	2
Party of Democratic Socialism (India)		Left Front (contested alone)	1
Independents (IND)			62
Total			313

== Highlights ==
Election to the Tripura Legislative Assembly were held on February 23, 2008. The election were held in a single phase for all the 60 assembly constituencies.

=== Participating Political Parties ===
#	Partytype Abbreviation	Party
National Parties
1	BJP	Bhartiya Janta Party
2	CPI	COMMUNIST PARTY OF INDIA
3	CPM	Communist Party of India (Marxist)
4	INC	Indian National Congress
5	NCP	Nationalist Congress Party
State Parties
6	INPT	Indigenous Nationalist Party of Twipra
State parties – other states
7	AIFB	All India Forward Bloc
8	AITC	All India Trinamool Congress
9	CPI(ML)(L)	Communist Party of India (Marxist-Leninist) (Liberation)
10	JD(U)	Janata Dal (United)
11	LJP	Lok Jan Shakti Party
12	RSP	Revolutionary Socialist Party
Registered (Unrecognised) Parties
13	AMB	Amra Bangalee
14	PDS	Party For Democratic Socialism
Independents
15	IND	Independent

=== No. of Constituencies ===
Type of Constituencies	GEN	SC	ST	Total
No. of Constituencies	33	7	20	60

=== Electors ===
	Men	Women	Total
No.of Electors	1,038,782	999,219	2,038,001
No.of Electors who Voted	942,604	916,518	1,859,122
Polling Percentage	90.74%	91.72%	91.22%

=== Performance of Women Candidates ===
	Men	Women	Total
No.of Contestants	282	31	313
Elected	57	03	60

== List of Candidates ==
=== Candidates from Prominent Parties/Alliance ===
Constituency							
Constituency		LFT		UPA		BJP	
1	Simna (ST)	CPI(M)	Pranab Debbarma	INPT	Rabindra Debbarma	Did not contest	
2	Mohanpur	CPI(M)	Subhas Chandra Debnath	INC	Ratan Lal Nath	BJP	Dhirendra Debnath
3	Bamutia (SC)	CPI(M)	Haricharan Sarkar	INC	Prakash Chandra Das	BJP	Samir Biswas
4	Barjala	CPI(M)	Sankar Prasad Datta	INC	Dipak Kumar Roy	BJP	Pulak Kumar Debnath
5	Khayerpur	CPI(M)	Pabitra Kar	INC	Ratan Chakraborty	BJP	Pranjit Banik
6	Agartala	CPI(M)	Bikash Roy	INC	Sudip Roy Barman	BJP	Milan Chakraborty
7	Ramnagar	CPI(M)	Ratan Das	INC	Surajit Datta	BJP	Nilima Ghosh
8	Town Bordowali	CPI(M)	Dr. Sudhir Chandra Majumder	INC	Sudhir Ranjan Majumdar	BJP	Rakhal Chakraborty
9	Banamalipur	CPI	Prasanta Kapali	INC	Gopal Chandra Roy	BJP	Sudhindra Chandra Dasgupta
10	Majlishpur	CPI(M)	Manik Dey	INC	Dipak Nag	BJP	Paresh Chandra Saha
11	Mandaibazar (ST)	CPI(M)	Monoranjan Debbarma	INPT	Jagadish Debbarma	Did not contest	
12	Takarjala (ST)	CPI(M)	Niranjan Debbarma	INPT	Rajeshwar Debbarma	Did not contest	
13	Pratapgarh (SC)	CPI(M)	Anil Sarkar	INC	Bimal Chandra Barman	BJP	Arjun Ch. Das
14	Badharghat	CPI(M)	Subrata Chakraborty	INC	Dilip Sarkar	BJP	Rama Prasad Paul
15	Kamalasagar	CPI(M)	Narayan Chandra Choudhuri	INC	Matilal Saha	BJP	Tulsi Banik
16	Bishalgarh	CPI(M)	Bhanulal Saha	INC	Samir Ranjan Barman	BJP	Subrata Sarkar
17	Golaghati (ST)	CPI(M)	Kesab Debbarma	INC	Ashok Debbarma	Did not contest	
18	Charilam (ST)	CPI(M)	Narayan Rupini	INPT	Narendra Chandra Debbarma	Did not contest	
19	Boxanagar	CPI(M)	Sahid Choudhuri	INC	Billal Mia	BJP	Gopal Chandra Das
20	Nalchar (SC)	CPI(M)	Sukumar Barman	INC	Sukla Das	BJP	Sujit Das
21	Sonamura	CPI(M)	Subal Rudra	INC	Subal Bhowmik	BJP	Swapan Chandra Saha
22	Dhanpur	CPI(M)	Manik Sarkar	INC	Shah Alam	Did not contest	
23	Ramchandraghat (ST)	CPI(M)	Padma Kumar Debbarma	INPT	Ananta Debbarma	Did not contest	
24	Khowai	CPI(M)	Samir Deb Sarkar	INC	Arun Kumar Kar	BJP	Dhananjoy Debnath
25	Asharambari (ST)	CPI(M)	Sachindra Debbarma	INPT	Amiya Kumar Debbarma	BJP	Dhanbhakti Jamatia
26	Pramodenagar (ST)	CPI(M)	Aghore Debbarma	INPT	Bidyut Debbarma	Did not contest	
27	Kalyanpur	CPI(M)	Manindra Chandra Das	INC	Kajal Chandra Das	BJP	Harishankar Paul
28	Krishnapur (ST)	CPI(M)	Khagendra Jamatia	INC	Sabda Kumar Jamatia	BJP	Mania Debbarma
29	Teliamura	CPI(M)	Gouri Das	INC	Ashok Kumar Baidya	BJP	Laxmi Kanta Sarkar
30	Bagma (ST)	CPI(M)	Naresh Chandra Jamatia	INC	Rati Mohan Jamatia	BJP	Raj Kumar Jamatia
31	Salgarh (SC)	RSP	Partha Das	INC	Mira Das	BJP	Rabindra Kumar Das
32	Radhakishorepur	RSP	Joygobinda Deb Roy	INC	Pranajit Singha Roy	BJP	Swapan Adhikari
33	Matarbari	CPI(M)	Madhab Chandra Saha	INC	Bibhu Kumari Devi	BJP	Madhu Sudhan Bhattacharjee
34	Kakraban	CPI(M)	Keshab Majumder	INC	Rajib Samaddar	BJP	Basana Adhikari
35	Rajnagar (SC)	CPI(M)	Sudhan Das	INC	Bikash Chandra Das	BJP	Radha Rani Das (Bhowmik)
36	Belonia	CPI(M)	Basu Dev Majumder	INC	Amal Mallik	BJP	Keshab Chandra Sarkar
37	Santirbazar (ST)	CPI	Manindra Reang	INC	Gouri Sankar Reang	BJP	Parikshit Debbarma
38	Hrishyamukh	CPI(M)	Badal Choudhury	INC	Dilip Choudhury	BJP	Sudharshan Majumder
39	Jolaibari (ST)	CPI(M)	Jashabir Tripura	INC	Brajendra Mog Chaudhuri	Did not contest	
40	Manu (ST)	CPI(M)	Jitendra Choudhury	INC	Thaikhai Mog	BJP	Mrathaiong Mog
41	Sabroom	CPI(M)	Rita Kar (Majumder)	Did not contest		BJP	Ranjit Roy Chowdhury
42	Ampinagar (ST)	CPI(M)	Daniel Jamatia	INPT	Nagendra Jamatia	Did not contest	
43	Birganj	CPI(M)	Manoranjan Acharjee	INC	Jawhar Saha	BJP	Haradhan Saha
44	Raima Valley (ST)	CPI(M)	Sri Lalit Mohan Tripura	INPT	Sri Rabindra Debbarma	Did not contest	
45	Kamalpur	CPI(M)	Smt Bijoy Lakshmi Singha	INC	Sri Manoj Kanti Deb	BJP	Sri Uma Kanta Debnath
46	Surma (SC)	CPI(M)	Sri Sudir Das	INC	Sri Sukha Ranjan Das	BJP	Sri Nishi Kanta Sarkar
47	Salema (ST)	CPI(M)	Prasanta Debbarma	INC	Jadu Mohan Tripura	BJP	Mahendra Debbarma
48	Kulai (ST)	CPI(M)	Smt. Sabitri Debbarma	INPT	Bijoy Kumar Hrangkhawl	BJP	Sri Kalpa Mohan Tripura
49	Chhawmanu (ST)	CPI(M)	Nirajoy Tripura	INPT	Shyama Charan Tripura	BJP	Sri Jagat Jyoti Chakma
50	Pabiachhara (SC)	CPI(M)	Bidhu Bhusan Malakar	INC	Phanindra Das	BJP	Bhagaban Das
51	Fatikroy	CPI(M)	Bijoy Roy	INC	Sunil Chandra Das	BJP	Bireswar Singha
52	Chandipur	CPI(M)	Tapan Chakraborty	INC	Rudrendu Bhattacharjee	BJP	Kaberi Sinha
53	Kailasahar	CPI(M)	Jayanta Chakraborty	INC	Birajit Sinha	BJP	Santosh Debroy
54	Kurti	CPI(M)	Fayzur Rahman	INC	Nurul Haque	BJP	Sankar Kodal
55	Kadamtala	CPI(M)	Bijita Nath	INC	Jyotirmoy Nath	BJP	Sukanta Nath
56	Dharmanagar	CPI(M)	Amitabha Datta	INC	Biswa Bandhu Sen	BJP	Tamal Kanti Deb
57	Jubarajnagar	CPI(M)	Ramendra Chandra Debnath	INC	Biva Rani Nath	BJP	Pijush Nath
58	Pencharthal (ST)	CPI(M)	Arun Kumar Chakma	INC	Sushil Kumar Chakma	BJP	Manishankar Chakma
59	Panisagar	CPI(M)	Subodh Das	INC	Radhika Ranjan Das	BJP	Dhananjay Debnath
60	Kanchanpur (ST)	CPI(M)	Rajendra Reang	INC	Sanjit Kumar Reang	BJP	Upendra Reang

== Background ==
Except for a one term period of Congress government between 1988 and 1993, the CPI(M) was the dominant governing party in the state since 1978.

The previous elections to the 9th Tripura Legislative Assembly was held in 2003 and the term for this Assembly was set to expire on 19 March 2008. The Election Commission of India (ECI) announced fresh elections for the 10th Tripura Legislative Assembly on 14 January 2008. Of the 60 constituencies for the 2008 election, 20 were reserved for Scheduled Tribes and seven reserved for Scheduled Castes. Elections in all polling stations were held using electronic voting machines.

The CPI(M), headed by Manik Sarkar, had formed the Government in the 9th Tripura Assembly after being re-elected in 2003. The Left Front had won 41 of the 60 seats.

== Campaign ==
A total of 313 candidates contested this election.

== Election Day ==
Election Day (23 Feb 2008) was peaceful and passed without any incidents of violence in this state that has traditionally faced insurgency from militant outfits. Unprecedented security arrangements were in place for this election - 20,000 paramilitary personnel from the Border Security Force, Indo-Tibetan Border Police and Central Reserve Police Force supported by air surveillance.

Voter turnout across the state was over 90%, a record high for any state in India. This beat the previous record of around 86% set in Sikkim during the Assembly Elections in 2002.

== Results ==
=== Results by alliance and party ===
Party	Seats contested	Seats won	No. of votes	% of votes	% in Seats contested	Seats Forfeited	2003 Seats
Communist Party of India (Marxist)	56	46	903,009	48.01%	51.21%	0	38
Revolutionary Socialist Party	2	2	31,717	1.69%	52.58%	0	2
Communist Party of India	2	1	27,891	1.48%	48.65%	0	1
Total	60	49	926,617	51.18%		0	41
Indian National Congress	48	10	684,207	36.38%	44.38%	1	13
Indigenous Nationalist Party of Twipra	11	1	116,761	6.21%	38.23%	2	6
Bharatiya Janata Party	49	0	28,102	1.49%	1.79%	49	0
Nationalist Congress Party	5	0	1,882	0.10%	0.92%	5	0
All India Trinamool Congress	22	0	6,620	0.35%	0.92%	22	0
Communist Party of India (Marxist-Leninist) Liberation	14	0	5,261	0.28%	1.11%	14	0
All India Forward Bloc	12	0	2,961	0.16%	0.74%	12	0
Janata Dal (United)	2	0	1,081	0.06%	1.74%	2	0
Lok Janshakti Party	8	0	2,738	0.15%	1.07%	8	0
Amra Bangalee	19	0	5,532	0.29%	0.96%	19	0
Party of Democratic Socialism	1	0	2,062	0.11%	6.13%	1	0
Independents	62	0	61,010	3.24%	4.94%	58	0
Total	313	60	1,880,834			193	
Source: ECI

=== Results by constituency ===
Constituency			Winner				Runner Up				Margin	%
#	Name	Poll %	Candidate	Party	Votes	%	Candidate	Party	Votes	%	Margin	%
1	Simna (ST)	92.69	Pranab Debbarma	CPM	14,439	54.86	Rabindra Debbarma	INPT	11,108	42.20	3,331	12.66
2	Mohanpur	92.73	Ratan Lal Nath	INC	14,349	50.74	Subhas Chandra Debnath	CPM	12,993	45.95	1,356	4.79
3	Bamutia (SC)	93.73	Haricharan Sarkar	CPM	17,324	52.07	Prakash Chandra Das	INC	14,944	44.91	2,380	7.16
4	Barjala	93.25	Sankar Prasad Datta	CPM	24,853	48.93	Dipak Kumar Roy	INC	24,255	47.76	598	1.17
5	Khayerpur	92.32	Pabitra Kar	CPM	18,833	49.67	Ratan Chakraborti	INC	17,832	47.03	1,001	2.64
6	Agartala	87.25	Sudip Roy Barman	INC	21,019	50.82	Bikash Roy	CPM	19,194	46.41	1,825	4.41
7	Ramnagar	89.09	Surajit Datta	INC	16,569	52.22	Ratan Das	CPM	14,198	44.74	2,371	7.48
8	Town Bordowali	89.02	Sudhir Ranjan Majumder	INC	14,190	54.43	Sudhir Ch. Majumder	CPM	10,965	42.06	3,225	12.37
9	Banamalipur	87.05	Gopal Chandra Roy	INC	12,354	54.68	Prasanta Kapali	CPI	9,546	42.25	2,808	12.43
10	Majlishpur	93.70	Manik Dey	CPM	17,745	50.88	Dipak Nag	INC	16,497	47.30	1,248	3.58
11	Mandaibazar (ST)	90.65	Monoranjan Debbarma	CPM	16,605	49.44	Jagadish Debbarma	INPT	15,638	46.56	967	2.88
12	Takarjala (ST)	90.76	Niranjan Debbarma	CPM	12,470	50.90	Rajeshwar Debbarma	INPT	11,008	44.93	1,462	5.97
13	Pratapgarh (SC)	92.30	Anil Sarkar	CPM	32,105	53.79	Bimal Chandra Barman	INC	25,055	41.97	7,050	11.82
14	Badharghat	92.78	Dilip Sarkar	INC	29,724	48.43	Subrata Chakraborty	CPM	29,349	47.82	375	0.61
15	Kamalasagar	93.80	Narayan Ch. Choudhuri	CPM	17,042	52.52	Matilal Saha	INC	14,209	43.79	2,833	8.73
16	Bishalgarh	94.33	Bhanulal Saha	CPM	15,457	50.50	Samir Ranjan Barman	INC	14,543	47.51	914	2.99
17	Golaghati (ST)	93.06	Kesab Debbarma	CPM	13,990	54.04	Ashok Debbarma	INC	11,003	42.51	2,987	11.53
18	Charilam (ST)	91.99	Narayan Rupini	CPM	14,216	49.44	N. C. Debbarma	INPT	13,729	47.75	487	1.69
19	Boxanagar	93.94	Sahid Choudhuri	CPM	13,791	49.55	Billal Mia	INC	13,099	47.06	692	2.49
20	Nalchar (SC)	94.46	Sukumar Barman	CPM	14,748	52.40	Sukla Das	INC	12,216	43.40	2,532	9.00
21	Sonamura	94.79	Subal Bhowmik	INC	14,837	50.24	Subal Rudra	CPM	14,008	47.43	829	2.81
22	Dhanpur	94.64	Manik Sarkar	CPM	17,992	52.91	Shah Alam	INC	15,074	44.32	2,918	8.59
23	Ramchandraghat (ST)	91.76	Padma Kumar Debbarma	CPM	11,611	59.22	Animesh Debbarma	IND	5,108	26.05	6,503	33.17
24	Khowai	95.81	Samir Deb Sarkar	CPM	15,385	54.33	Arun Kumar Kar	INC	12,062	42.59	3,323	11.74
25	Asharambari (ST)	92.44	Sachindra Debbarma	CPM	13,765	56.78	Amiya Kumar Debbarma	INPT	9,234	38.09	4,531	18.69
26	Pramodenagar (ST)	93.10	Aghore Debbarma	CPM	14,972	54.00	Animesh Debbarma	IND	10,153	36.62	4,819	17.38
27	Kalyanpur	93.44	Manindra Chandra Das	CPM	12,653	50.13	Kajal Chandra Das	INC	11,791	46.72	862	3.41
28	Krishnapur (ST)	90.25	Khagendra Jamatia	CPM	13,325	51.57	Sabda Kumar Jamatia	INC	11,508	44.54	1,817	7.03
29	Teliamura	92.42	Gouri Das	CPM	14,816	50.10	Ashok Kumar Baidya	INC	13,647	46.15	1,169	3.95
30	Bagma (ST)	93.05	Naresh Chandra Jamatia	CPM	14,979	52.05	Rati Mohan Jamatia	INC	13,064	45.39	1,915	6.66
31	Salgarh (SC)	94.44	Partha Das	RSP	17,235	55.60	Mira Das	INC	12,284	39.63	4,951	15.97
32	Radhakishorepur	94.61	Joygobinda Deb Roy	RSP	14,482	49.39	Pranajit Singha Roy	INC	14,015	47.80	467	1.59
33	Matarbari	95.29	Madhab Chandra Saha	CPM	15,601	50.18	Bibhu Kumari Devi	INC	14,381	46.26	1,220	3.92
34	Kakraban	93.69	Keshab Majumder	CPM	16,659	58.87	Rajib Samaddar	INC	10,638	37.60	6,021	21.27
35	Rajnagar (SC)	94.07	Sudhan Das	CPM	22,111	56.58	Bikash Chandra Das	INC	14,843	37.98	7,268	18.60
36	Belonia	95.08	Basu Dev Majumder	CPM	15,971	50.47	Amal Mallik	INC	14,652	46.30	1,319	4.17
37	Santirbazar (ST)	93.54	Manindra Reang	CPI	18,345	52.81	Gouri Sankar Reang	INC	15,562	44.80	2,783	8.01
38	Hrishyamukh	95.22	Badal Choudhury	CPM	19,610	60.16	Dilip Choudhury	INC	11,849	36.35	7,761	23.81
39	Jolaibari (ST)	92.89	Jashabir Tripura	CPM	13,864	59.44	Brajendra Mog Chaudhuri	INC	8,356	35.82	5,508	23.62
40	Manu (ST)	94.07	Jitendra Choudhury	CPM	21,100	56.07	Thaikhai Mog	INC	14,940	39.70	6,160	16.37
41	Sabroom	93.61	Rita Kar (Majumder)	CPM	19,181	57.05	Premtosh Nath	IND	10,874	32.34	8,307	24.71
42	Ampinagar (ST)	91.19	Daniel Jamatia	CPM	14,284	53.26	Nagendra Jamatia	INPT	11,340	42.28	2,944	10.98
43	Birganj	95.47	Manoranjan Acharjee	CPM	18,262	52.05	Jawhar Saha	INC	15,607	44.48	2,655	7.57
44	Raima Valley (ST)	92.29	Sri Lalit Mohan Tripura	CPM	19,120	52.58	Sri Rabindra Debbarma	INPT	15,256	41.95	3,864	10.63
45	Kamalpur	92.98	Sri Manoj Kanti Deb	INC	11,839	48.20	Smt Bijoy Lakshmi Singha	CPM	11,704	47.65	135	0.55
46	Surma (SC)	91.38	Sri Sudir Das	CPM	14,359	51.88	Sri Sukha Ranjan Das	INC	11,711	42.31	2,648	9.57
47	Salema (ST)	91.02	Prasanta Debbarma	CPM	14,354	54.17	Jadu Mohan Tripura	INC	10,559	39.85	3,795	14.32
48	Kulai (ST)	90.55	Bijoy Hrangkhawl	INPT	14,944	46.87	Smt. Sabitri Debbarma	CPM	14,829	46.51	115	0.36
49	Chhawmanu (ST)	87.88	Sri Nirajoy Tripura	CPM	12,329	48.17	Shyama Charan Tripura	INPT	11,228	43.86	1,101	4.31
50	Pabiachhara (SC)	92.00	Bidhu Bhusan Malakar	CPM	17,354	51.10	Phanindra Das	INC	14,888	43.84	2,466	7.26
51	Fatikroy	92.37	Bijoy Roy	CPM	14,457	51.04	Sunil Chandra Das	INC	12,144	42.88	2,313	8.16
52	Chandipur	92.25	Tapan Chakraborty	CPM	17,565	56.44	Rudrendu Bhattacharjee	INC	11,531	37.05	6,034	19.39
53	Kailasahar	91.72	Birajit Sinha	INC	17,019	49.86	Jayanta Chakraborty	CPM	16,088	47.13	931	2.73
54	Kurti	89.53	Fayzur Rahman	CPM	14,337	49.79	Abdul Matin Choudhury	IND	11,109	38.58	3,228	11.21
55	Kadamtala	87.99	Bijita Nath	CPM	12,656	45.16	Jyotirmoy Nath	INC	12,528	44.70	128	0.46
56	Dharmanagar	89.93	Biswa Bandhu Sen	INC	15,987	51.65	Amitabha Datta	CPM	13,577	43.86	2,410	7.79
57	Jubarajnagar	92.95	Ramendra Debnath	CPM	14,710	51.22	Biva Rani Nath	INC	13,094	45.59	1,616	5.63
58	Pencharthal (ST)	89.78	Arun Kumar Chakma	CPM	17,210	50.54	Sushil Kumar Chakma	INC	14,460	42.47	2,750	8.07
59	Panisagar	89.14	Subodh Das	CPM	13,942	49.80	Radhika Ranjan Das	INC	12,234	43.70	1,708	6.10
60	Kanchanpur (ST)	88.49	Rajendra Reang	CPM	13,952	48.06	Sanjit Kumar Reang	INC	13,449	46.33	503	1.73
