= Kakraban Assembly constituency =

Constituency of the Tripura legislative assembly in India

Kakraban
- Former constituency for the Tripura Legislative Assembly

Constituency details
- Country: India
- Region: Northeast India
- State: Tripura
- Established: 1971
- Abolished: 2008
- Total electors: 30,203

Kakraban Assembly constituency was an assembly constituency in the Indian state of Tripura.

== Members of the Legislative Assembly ==
Election	Member	Party
1972	Ajit Ranjan Ghosh	Indian National Congress
1977	Kashab Chandra Majumder	Communist Party of India
1983	Kashab Chandra Majumder	Communist Party of India
1988	Kashab Chandra Majumder	Communist Party of India
1993	Kashab Chandra Majumder	Communist Party of India
1998	Kashab Chandra Majumder	Communist Party of India
2003	Kashab Chandra Majumder	Communist Party of India
2008	Kashab Chandra Majumder	Communist Party of India

== Election results ==
=== Assembly Election 2008 ===
2008 Tripura Legislative Assembly election : Kakraban
Party	Candidate	Votes	%	±%
CPI(M)	Kashab Chandra Majumder	16,659	58.87%	▼3.93
INC	Rajib Samaddar	10,638	37.60%	▲3.38
Independent	Uttam Deb	521	1.84%	New
BJP	Basana Adhikari	478	1.69%	New
Margin of victory		6,021	21.28%	▼7.31
Turnout		28,296	93.81%	▲9.51
Registered electors		30,203		▲1.46
CPI(M) hold		Swing	▼3.93	

=== Assembly Election 2003 ===
2003 Tripura Legislative Assembly election : Kakraban
Party	Candidate	Votes	%	±%
CPI(M)	Kashab Chandra Majumder	15,736	62.80%	▲6.76
INC	Rajib Samaddar	8,573	34.21%	▼4.96
NCP	Barun Kumar Jamatia	297	1.19%	New
Independent	Rati Ranjan Das	256	1.02%	New
Independent	Dilip Debnath	195	0.78%	New
Margin of victory		7,163	28.59%	▲11.72
Turnout		25,057	84.21%	▲2.69
Registered electors		29,768		▲12.38
CPI(M) hold		Swing	▲6.76	

=== Assembly Election 1998 ===
1998 Tripura Legislative Assembly election : Kakraban
Party	Candidate	Votes	%	±%
CPI(M)	Kashab Chandra Majumder	12,096	56.04%	▲1.94
INC	Gouranga Dhar	8,455	39.17%	▲11.25
BJP	Hirudhan Deb	746	3.46%	▲2.29
Independent	Manindra Murasingh	127	0.59%	New
Margin of victory		3,641	16.87%	▼9.31
Turnout		21,584	82.94%	▼0.43
Registered electors		26,489		
CPI(M) hold		Swing	▲1.94	

=== Assembly Election 1993 ===
1993 Tripura Legislative Assembly election : Kakraban
Party	Candidate	Votes	%	±%
CPI(M)	Kashab Chandra Majumder	11,202	54.10%	▼2.91
INC	Subrata Dhar	5,782	27.93%	▼14.24
Independent	Lakshmi Nag (Bagman)	3,193	15.42%	New
BJP	Hirudhan Deb	241	1.16%	New
Independent	Jitendra Majumder	126	0.61%	New
Margin of victory		5,420	26.18%	▲11.32
Turnout		20,705	83.02%	▼5.16
Registered electors		25,276		
CPI(M) hold		Swing	▼2.91	

=== Assembly Election 1988 ===
1988 Tripura Legislative Assembly election : Kakraban
Party	Candidate	Votes	%	±%
CPI(M)	Kashab Chandra Majumder	10,372	57.01%	▲5.01
INC	Subrata Dhar	7,670	42.16%	▼5.21
Independent	Lalit Dutta	150	0.82%	New
Margin of victory		2,702	14.85%	▲10.22
Turnout		18,192	88.21%	▲1.07
Registered electors		20,893		▲13.18
CPI(M) hold		Swing		

=== Assembly Election 1983 ===
1983 Tripura Legislative Assembly election : Kakraban
Party	Candidate	Votes	%	±%
CPI(M)	Kashab Chandra Majumder	8,256	52.00%	▼1.70
INC	Nanik Chandra Das	7,521	47.37%	▲23.57
Independent	Shibu Chandra Debnath	99	0.62%	New
Margin of victory		735	4.63%	▼25.26
Turnout		15,876	87.28%	▲5.29
Registered electors		18,460		▲17.99
CPI(M) hold		Swing		

=== Assembly Election 1977 ===
1977 Tripura Legislative Assembly election : Kakraban
Party	Candidate	Votes	%	±%
CPI(M)	Kashab Chandra Majumder	6,781	53.70%	▲17.37
INC	Ajit Ranjan Ghosh	3,006	23.80%	▼19.39
TPCC	Tapan Kumar Sarkar	1,087	8.61%	New
TUS	Gajendra Mura Sing	1,036	8.20%	New
JP	Amalendu Majumder	718	5.69%	New
Margin of victory		3,775	29.89%	▲23.03
Turnout		12,628	82.71%	▲13.81
Registered electors		15,646		▲33.48
CPI(M) gain from INC		Swing	▲10.51	

=== Assembly Election 1972 ===
1972 Tripura Legislative Assembly election : Kakraban
Party	Candidate	Votes	%	±%
INC	Ajit Ranjan Ghosh	3,387	43.19%	New
CPI(M)	Kashab Chandra Majumder	2,849	36.33%	New
Independent	Kamini Kumar Das	861	10.98%	New
Independent	Manik Chandra Das	745	9.50%	New
Margin of victory		538	6.86%	
Turnout		7,842	69.40%	
Registered electors		11,722		
INC win (new seat)				
