= 1977 Tripura Legislative Assembly election =

Indian state election

- 31 December 1977

60 seats in the Assembly 31 seats needed for a majority
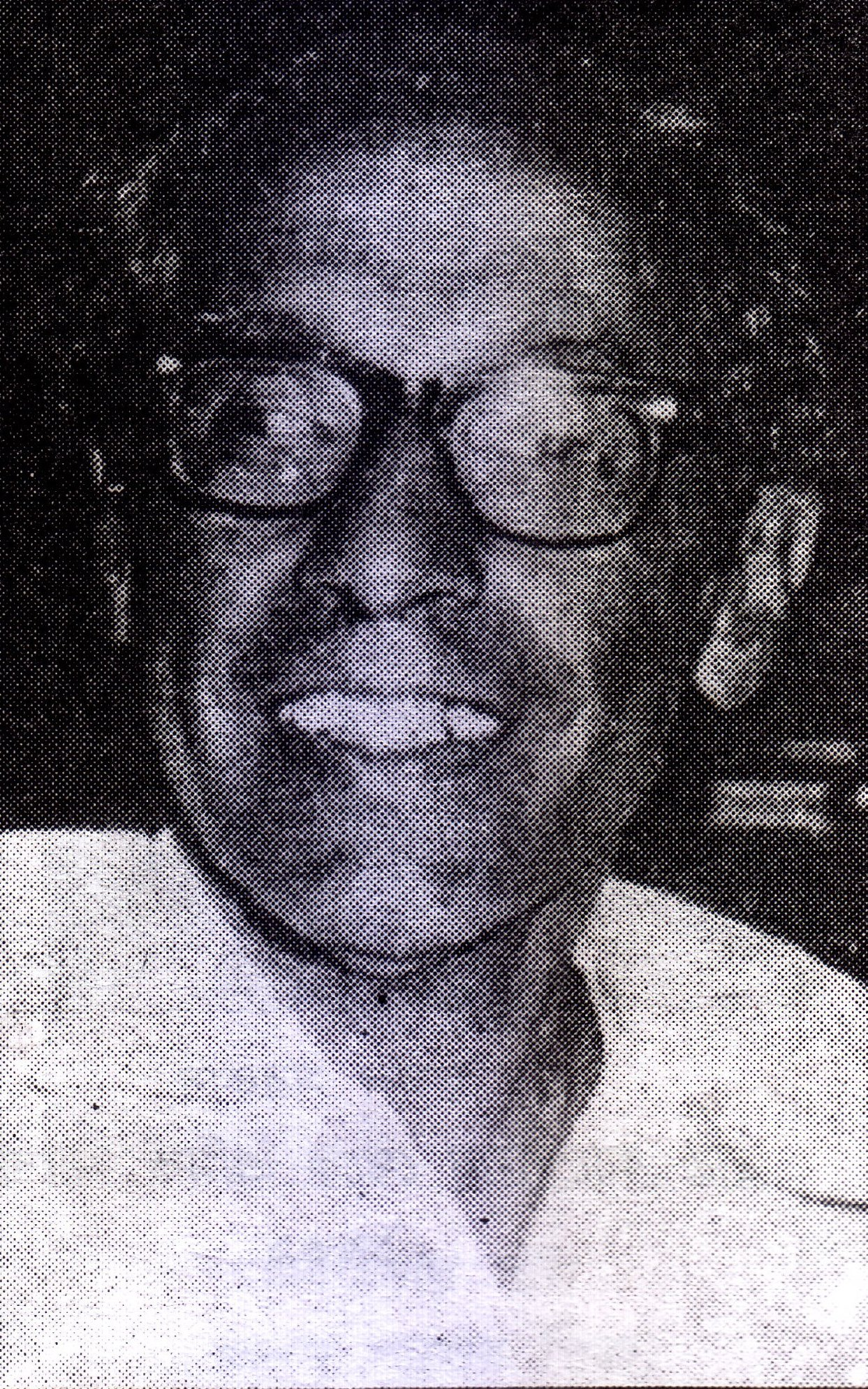
	First party
Leader	Nripen Chakraborty
Party	CPI(M)
Leader's seat	Pramodenagar
Last election	16
Seats won	51
Seat change	▲35
Popular vote	352,652
Percentage	47.00%
Alliance seats	56
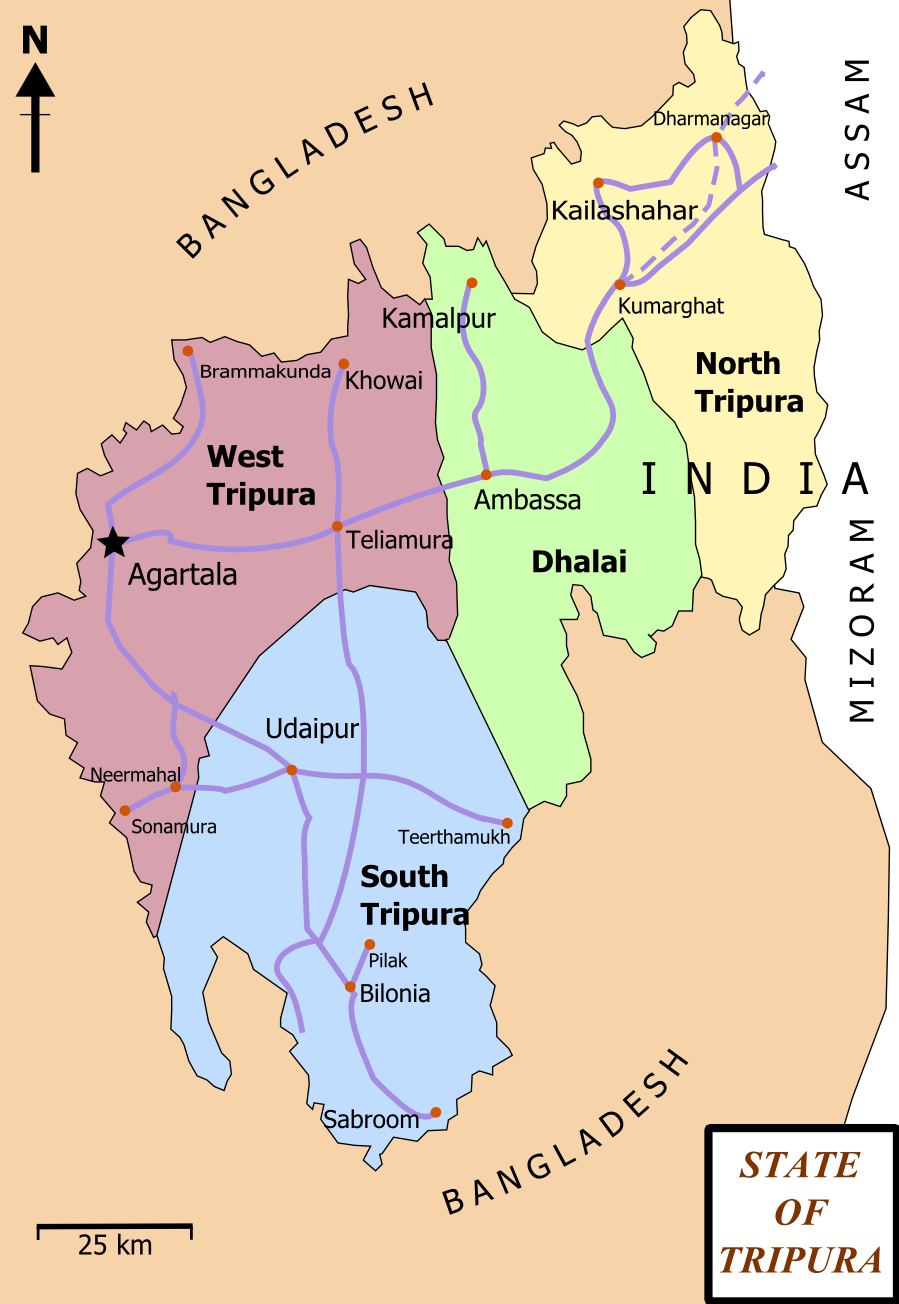
- Tripura District Map
Chief Minister before election
President's rule
Elected Chief Minister
Nripen Chakraborty
CPI(M)

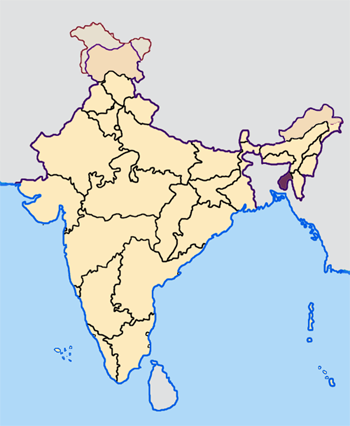
Tripura

The 1977 Tripura Legislative Assembly election took place in a single phase on 31 December 1977 to elect the Members of the Legislative Assembly (MLAs) from each of the 60 Assembly Constituencies in Tripura, India.

The Communist Party of India (Marxist) (CPI(M)), led Left Front won the election by 56 seats and formed a Government in Tripura.

== Highlights ==
Election to the Tripura Legislative Assembly were held on December 31, 1977. The election were held in a single phase for all the 60 assembly constituencies.

=== Participating Political Parties ===
Partytype Abbreviation	Party	
National Parties
1	CPI	Communist Party of India
2	CPI-M	Communist Party of India (Marxist)
3	INC	Indian National Congress
4	JNP	Janata Party
State Parties
5	FBL	All India Forward Bloc
6	RSP	Revolutionary Socialist Party
Registered (Unrecognised ) Parties
7	PBI	Proutist Bloc of India
8	TCD	Congress for Democracy
9	TUS	Tripura Upajati Zuba Samiti
Independents
10	IND	IndependentS

=== No. of Constituencies ===
Type of Constituencies	GEN	SC	ST	Total
No. of Constituencies	34	7	19	60

=== Electors ===
	Men	Women	Total
No.of Electors	495,342	466,656	961,998
No.of Electors who Voted	406,052	358,878	764,930
Polling Percentage	81.97%	76.90%	79.51%

=== Performance of Women Candidates ===
	Men	Women	Total
No.of Contestants	322	06	328
Elected	59	01	60

== Result ==
=== Results by party ===
Party	Seats contested	Seats won	No. of votes	% of votes	1972 Seats
Communist Party of India (Marxist)	55	51	352,652	47.00%	16
Tripura Upajati Juba Samiti	28	4	59,474	7.93%	0
Revolutionary Socialist Party	2	2	12,446	1.66%	-
All India Forward Bloc	1	1	7,800	1.04%	0
Indian National Congress	60	0	133,240	17.76%	41
Janata Party	59	0	78,479	10.46%	-
Congress for Democracy	59	0	66,913	9.08%	-
Communist Party of India	10	0	6,266	0.84%	1
Proutist Bloc of India	6	0	2,139	0.29%	-
Independents	48	2	30,862	4.11%	2
Total	328	60	750,271		
Source: ECI

=== Results by constituency ===
Winner, runner-up, voter turnout, and victory margin in every constituency
Assembly Constituency		Turnout	Winner				Runner Up				Margin
#k	Names	%	Candidate	Party	Votes	%	Candidate	Party	Votes	%	Margin
1	Simna	83.98%	Abhiram Debbarma	CPI(M)	6,800	54.13%	Maharajkumar Sahadev Bikram Kishore Dev Barman	JP	2,739	21.8%	4,061
2	Mohanpur	81.74%	Radharaman Debnath	CPI(M)	4,599	36.51%	Ambika Deb	CFD	2,797	22.21%	1,802
3	Bamutia	83.52%	Haricharan Sarkar	CPI(M)	6,195	49.7%	Parfulla Kumar Das	CFD	5,276	42.33%	919
4	Barjala	82.1%	Gouri Bhattacharjee	CPI(M)	8,178	58.79%	Reserwar Datta	CFD	3,317	23.84%	4,861
5	Khayerpur	78.93%	Akhil Debnath	CPI(M)	5,833	45.4%	Amar Ranjan Gupta	INC	2,168	16.87%	3,665
6	Agartala	78.14%	Ajoy Biswas	Independent	10,682	68.2%	Kamal Kumar Singha	CFD	2,021	12.9%	8,661
7	Ramnagar	78.72%	Biren Datta	CPI(M)	8,420	63.41%	Apanshu Mohan Lodh	INC	2,553	19.23%	5,867
8	Town Bordowali	77.93%	Brajagopal Roy	AIFB	7,800	62.76%	Dwijen Dey	JP	2,034	16.37%	5,766
9	Banamalipur	79.01%	Bibekananda Bhowmik	Independent	6,734	64.43%	Priya Lal Paul	CFD	1,745	16.7%	4,989
10	Majlishpur	84.67%	Khagen Das	CPI(M)	4,437	37.07%	Jatindra Kumar Majumdar	CFD	2,425	20.26%	2,012
11	Mandaibazar	78.24%	Rashiram Debbarma	CPI(M)	6,915	50.72%	Kshirode Debbarma	TUS	3,606	26.45%	3,309
12	Takarjala	76.36%	Sudhanwa Debbarma	CPI(M)	5,358	41.5%	Biswa Kumar Debbarma	TUS	4,075	31.56%	1,283
13	Pratapgarh	82.27%	Anil Sarkar	CPI(M)	10,869	66.44%	Madhusudan Das	INC	3,397	20.76%	7,472
14	Badharghat	80.06%	Jadab Majumder	CPI(M)	10,816	74.83%	Sachindra Lal Singha	CFD	1,844	12.76%	8,972
15	Kamalasagar	79.99%	Matilal Sarkar	CPI(M)	7,041	58.12%	Manoranjan Laskar	JP	2,451	20.23%	4,590
16	Bishalgarh	81.89%	Gautam Prasad Dutta	CPI(M)	5,384	45.47%	Samir Ranjan Barman	JP	3,546	29.95%	1,838
17	Golaghati	80.92%	Niranjan Debbarma	CPI(M)	4,254	31.85%	Budha Debbarma	TUS	3,171	23.74%	1,083
18	Charilam	79.78%	Harinath Debbarma	TUS	4,259	33.2%	Durga Prasad Sikdar	CPI(M)	3,231	25.18%	1,028
19	Boxanagar	84.81%	Arabar Rahaman	CPI(M)	5,255	47.1%	Munsur Ali	INC	4,114	36.88%	1,141
20	Nalchar	83.37%	Sumanta Kumar Das	CPI(M)	6,433	52.69%	Bir Chandra Barman	INC	2,945	24.12%	3,488
21	Sonamura	84.%	Subal Rudra	CPI(M)	6,469	53.88%	Debendra Kishore Chowdhury	INC	4,389	36.55%	2,080
22	Dhanpur	83.08%	Samar Chowdhury	CPI(M)	6,244	48.79%	Brojendra Ghosh	JP	3,100	24.22%	3,144
23	Ramchandraghat	89.22%	Dasarath Deb	CPI(M)	9,585	81.57%	Nand Kumar Debbarma	JP	1,166	9.92%	8,419
24	Khowai	84.66%	Swaraijam Kamini Thakur Singha	CPI(M)	5,715	51.25%	Arun Kar	CFD	3,215	28.83%	2,500
25	Asharambari	82.94%	Bidya Chandra Debbarma	CPI(M)	9,506	77.7%	Dayanand Debbarma	INC	1,125	9.19%	8,381
26	Pramodenagar	82.3%	Nirpen Chakraborty	CPI(M)	8,786	57.53%	Upendra Chandra Debnath	INC	2,565	16.79%	6,221
27	Kalyanpur	83.94%	Makhan Lal Chakraborty	CPI(M)	5,211	41.27%	Ashoke Kumar Bhattacharya	INC	2,842	22.51%	2,369
28	Krishnapur	67.32%	Manindra Debbarma	CPI(M)	6,116	57.3%	Maharajkumar Nakshatra Bikram	INC	1,703	15.95%	4,413
29	Teliamura	78.97%	Jitendra Sarkar	CPI(M)	5,769	42.31%	Ratan Chakraborty	INC	3,387	24.84%	2,382
30	Bagma	79.66%	Rati Mohan Jamaitia	TUS	5,652	45.26%	Ganapada Jamatia	CPI(M)	5,194	41.59%	458
31	Salgarh	82.49%	Gopal Chandra Das	RSP	6,968	60.32%	Jitendra Chandra Das	INC	1,620	14.02%	5,348
32	Radhakishorpur	80.8%	Jogesh Chakraborty	RSP	5,478	54.62%	Usha Ranjan Sen	INC	1,755	17.5%	3,723
33	Matarbari	82.2%	Naresh Chandra Ghosh	CPI(M)	6,372	50.91%	Anil Sarkar	INC	2,418	19.32%	3,954
34	Kakraban	82.71%	Kashab Chandra Majumder	CPI(M)	6,781	53.7%	Ajit Ranjan Ghosh	INC	3,006	23.8%	3,775
35	Rajnagar	78.8%	Nakul Das	CPI(M)	7,828	55.49%	Upendra Kumar Das	INC	5,100	36.15%	2,728
36	Belonia	81.72%	Jyotirmoy Das	CPI(M)	5,460	41.65%	Manoranjan Majumder	INC	5,341	40.74%	119
37	Santirbazar	78.29%	Drao Kumar Reang	TUS	4,397	30.08%	Subodh Chandra Nath	CPI(M)	3,902	26.69%	495
38	Hrishyamukh	83.22%	Badal Chowdhury	CPI(M)	7,552	56.01%	Arun Chandra Bhowmik	INC	5,209	38.63%	2,343
39	Jolaibari	76.69%	Brajamohan Jamatia	CPI(M)	3,603	36.57%	Kashi Ram Reang	INC	3,071	31.17%	532
40	Manu	78.9%	Matahari Chowdhury	CPI(M)	6,292	42.65%	Angju Mog	INC	5,098	34.56%	1,194
41	Sabroom	83.94%	Sunil Kumar Chowdhury	CPI(M)	6,537	46.94%	Rabindra Kumar Patari	INC	3,712	26.66%	2,825
42	Ampinagar	73.6%	Nagendra Jamatia	TUS	5,744	45.17%	Madhu Sudan Kalai	CPI(M)	4,814	37.86%	930
43	Birganj	77.9%	Syamal Saha	CPI(M)	5,745	39.5%	Kanai Lal Sarkar	INC	4,212	28.96%	1,533
44	Raima Valley	67.65%	Baju Ban Riyan	CPI(M)	7,661	72.65%	Monojay Roaja	TUS	1,588	15.06%	6,073
45	Kamalpur	84.04%	Bimal Singha	CPI(M)	7,634	70.06%	Brajakishore Singha	INC	1,156	10.61%	6,478
46	Surma	83.58%	Rudrewar Das	CPI(M)	7,403	57.83%	Jogendra Das	INC	2,096	16.37%	5,307
47	Salema	81.29%	Dinesh Debbarma	CPI(M)	6,890	53.24%	Madan Mohan Debbarma	INC	3,302	25.52%	3,588
48	Kulai	76.7%	Kamini Debbarma	CPI(M)	6,050	46.34%	Prafulla Roaja	INC	2,664	20.41%	3,386
49	Chawamanu	68.48%	Purna Mohan Tripura	CPI(M)	4,613	49.9%	Shyama Charan Tripura	TUS	1,587	17.17%	3,026
50	Pabiachhara	75.96%	Bidhu Bhusan Malakar	CPI(M)	6,270	53.84%	Brajendra Das	INC	2,778	23.85%	3,492
51	Fatikroy	82.67%	Tarani Mohan Singha	CPI(M)	6,057	44.21%	Gopesh Ranjan Deb	INC	3,365	24.56%	2,692
52	Chandipur	82.56%	Baidyanath Majumdar	CPI(M)	9,197	64.38%	Manindralal Bhowmik	INC	3,260	22.82%	5,937
53	Kailashahar	78.54%	Tapan Chakraborty	CPI(M)	7,111	53.36%	Abdul Shahid	INC	3,954	29.67%	3,157
54	Kurti	76.51%	Faizur Rahaman	CPI(M)	5,500	48.28%	Gopendra Kumar Das	JP	1,233	10.82%	4,267
55	Kadamtala	73.02%	Umesh Chandra Nath	CPI(M)	5,575	56.06%	Luthfur Rahaman Chowdhury	JP	1,731	17.41%	3,844
56	Dharmanagar	79.12%	Amarendra Sarma	CPI(M)	6,640	53.94%	Debiprasad Purkayastha	INC	2,963	24.07%	3,677
57	Jubarajnagar	80.62%	Ram Kumar Nath	CPI(M)	6,379	56.21%	Manoranjan Nath	CFD	2,255	19.87%	4,124
58	Pencharthal	70.29%	Mohan Lal Chakma	CPI(M)	4,977	42.47%	Sushil Kumar Chakma	INC	2,966	25.31%	2,011
59	Panisagar	75.21%	Subodh Chandra Das	CPI(M)	5,588	58.4%	Debendra Chandra Nath	Independent	781	8.16%	4,807
60	Kanchanpur	65.06%	Mandida Reang	CPI(M)	5,608	55.81%	Sukadayal Jamatia	TUS	2,012	20.02%	3,596

== Government Formation ==
The Left Front won a majority of the 60 seats in the Legislative Assembly. The LF was an alliance of left-wing political parties, including the Communist Party of India (Marxist) (CPI-M). Nripen Chakraborty of the CPI-M formed a government as Chief Minister on January 5, 1978.
