= Kadamtala Assembly constituency =

Constituency of the Tripura legislative assembly in India

Kadamtala
- Former constituency for the Tripura Legislative Assembly

Constituency details
- Country: India
- Region: Northeast India
- State: Tripura
- Established: 1963
- Abolished: 2008
- Total electors: 31,852

Kadamtala Assembly constituency was an assembly constituency in the Indian state of Tripura.

== Members of the Legislative Assembly ==
Election	Member	Party
1967	A. Wazid	Indian National Congress
1972	Benoy Bhushan Banerjee	Indian National Congress
1977	Umesh Chandra Nath	Communist Party of India
1983	Samir Kumar Nath	Communist Party of India
1988	Jyotirmoy Nath	Indian National Congress
1993	Umesh Chandra Nath	Communist Party of India
1998	Umesh Chandra Nath	Communist Party of India
2003	Jyotirmoy Nath	Indian National Congress
2008	Bijita Nath	Communist Party of India

== Election results ==
=== Assembly Election 2008 ===
2008 Tripura Legislative Assembly election : Kadamtala
Party	Candidate	Votes	%	±%
CPI(M)	Bijita Nath	12,656	45.16%	▲2.92
INC	Jyotirmoy Nath	12,528	44.70%	▲2.24
BJP	Sukanta Nath	1,044	3.72%	▼9.71
JD(U)	Abdul Hachib	985	3.51%	New
Independent	Apurba Nath	322	1.15%	New
LJP	Fazlur Rahaman	264	0.94%	New
AIFB	Mozir Uddin	228	0.81%	New
Margin of victory		128	0.46%	▲0.23
Turnout		28,027	88.07%	▲10.19
Registered electors		31,852		▲6.86
CPI(M) gain from INC		Swing	▲2.69	

=== Assembly Election 2003 ===
2003 Tripura Legislative Assembly election : Kadamtala
Party	Candidate	Votes	%	±%
INC	Jyotirmoy Nath	9,847	42.46%	▲10.28
CPI(M)	Subodh Nath	9,795	42.24%	▲6.26
BJP	Ranajoy Kumar Deb	3,115	13.43%	▼2.77
Independent	Abdul Rafik	237	1.02%	New
CPI(ML)L	Subirjit Sinha	196	0.85%	New
Margin of victory		52	0.22%	▼3.57
Turnout		23,190	77.89%	▲0.93
Registered electors		29,807		▲14.38
INC gain from CPI(M)		Swing	▲6.49	

=== Assembly Election 1998 ===
1998 Tripura Legislative Assembly election : Kadamtala
Party	Candidate	Votes	%	±%
CPI(M)	Umesh Chandra Nath	7,207	35.98%	▲0.77
INC	Jyotirmoy Nath	6,447	32.18%	▲6.74
BJP	Ronajoy Kumar Deb	3,246	16.20%	▲3.18
JD	Md. Fakaruddin	3,083	15.39%	New
Margin of victory		760	3.79%	▼5.97
Turnout		20,033	78.91%	▲2.57
Registered electors		26,060		
CPI(M) hold		Swing	▲0.77	

=== Assembly Election 1993 ===
1993 Tripura Legislative Assembly election : Kadamtala
Party	Candidate	Votes	%	±%
CPI(M)	Umesh Chandra Nath	6,792	35.20%	▼4.51
INC	Jyotirmoy Nath	4,909	25.44%	▼17.05
Independent	Fazlur Rahaman	3,814	19.77%	New
BJP	Ranajoy Kumar Deb	2,512	13.02%	▲11.45
Independent	Sundar Mukherjee	850	4.41%	New
Independent	Subirjit Sinha	221	1.15%	New
AMB	Gopal Krishna Deb	97	0.50%	New
Margin of victory		1,883	9.76%	▲6.98
Turnout		19,294	75.37%	▼6.22
Registered electors		25,968		
CPI(M) gain from INC		Swing	▼7.29	

=== Assembly Election 1988 ===
1988 Tripura Legislative Assembly election : Kadamtala
Party	Candidate	Votes	%	±%
INC	Jyotirmoy Nath	6,759	42.49%	▲4.38
CPI(M)	Samir Kumar Nath	6,317	39.71%	▼1.09
Independent	Sundar Mukharjee	2,414	15.18%	New
BJP	Ranajoy Kumar Deb	249	1.57%	New
Independent	Kantilal Majumder	167	1.05%	New
Margin of victory		442	2.78%	▲0.09
Turnout		15,906	81.80%	▲5.34
Registered electors		19,754		▲19.74
INC gain from CPI(M)		Swing	▲1.69	

=== Assembly Election 1983 ===
1983 Tripura Legislative Assembly election : Kadamtala
Party	Candidate	Votes	%	±%
CPI(M)	Samir Kumar Nath	5,061	40.81%	▼15.25
INC	Jyotirmoy Nath	4,727	38.11%	▲31.88
Independent	Sundar Mukherjee	1,967	15.86%	New
Independent	Moulana Abdur Rahim	487	3.93%	New
Independent	Kumud Ranajan Nath	160	1.29%	New
Margin of victory		334	2.69%	▼35.96
Turnout		12,402	76.63%	▲3.76
Registered electors		16,497		▲18.47
CPI(M) hold		Swing	▼15.25	

=== Assembly Election 1977 ===
1977 Tripura Legislative Assembly election : Kadamtala
Party	Candidate	Votes	%	±%
CPI(M)	Umesh Chandra Nath	5,575	56.06%	▲36.26
JP	Luthfur Rahaman Chowdhury	1,731	17.41%	New
TPCC	Abdul Wazid	1,325	13.32%	New
Independent	Sundar Mukherjee	694	6.98%	New
INC	Radha Raman Nath	620	6.23%	▼34.51
Margin of victory		3,844	38.65%	▲23.97
Turnout		9,945	73.02%	▲11.20
Registered electors		13,925		▲27.29
CPI(M) gain from INC		Swing	▲15.32	

=== Assembly Election 1972 ===
1972 Tripura Legislative Assembly election : Kadamtala
Party	Candidate	Votes	%	±%
INC	Benoy Bhushan Banerjee	2,684	40.74%	▼6.61
Independent	Abdul Rup	1,717	26.06%	New
CPI(M)	Umesh Chandra Nath	1,304	19.79%	▼27.28
Independent	Anil Krishna Sarma	591	8.97%	New
AIFB	Arun Kanti Nath	292	4.43%	New
Margin of victory		967	14.68%	▲14.40
Turnout		6,588	61.99%	▼5.78
Registered electors		10,940		▼41.95
INC hold		Swing	▼6.61	

=== Assembly Election 1967 ===
1967 Tripura Legislative Assembly election : Kadamtala
Party	Candidate	Votes	%	±%
INC	A. Wazid	5,890	47.35%	New
CPI(M)	S. D. Nath	5,856	47.08%	New
Independent	K. R. Nath	693	5.57%	New
Margin of victory		34	0.27%	
Turnout		12,439	68.91%	
Registered electors		18,847		
INC win (new seat)				
