= 1993 Tripura Legislative Assembly election =

Indian regional election

- 15 February 1993

60 seats in the Assembly 31 seats needed for a majority
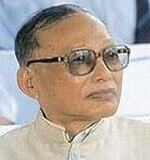

	First party	Second party
Leader	Dasarath Deb	-
Party	CPI(M)	INC
Leader's seat	Ramchandraghat	-
Last election	26	25
Seats won	44	10
Seat change	▲18	▼15
Popular vote	599,943	438,561
Percentage	44.78%	32.73%
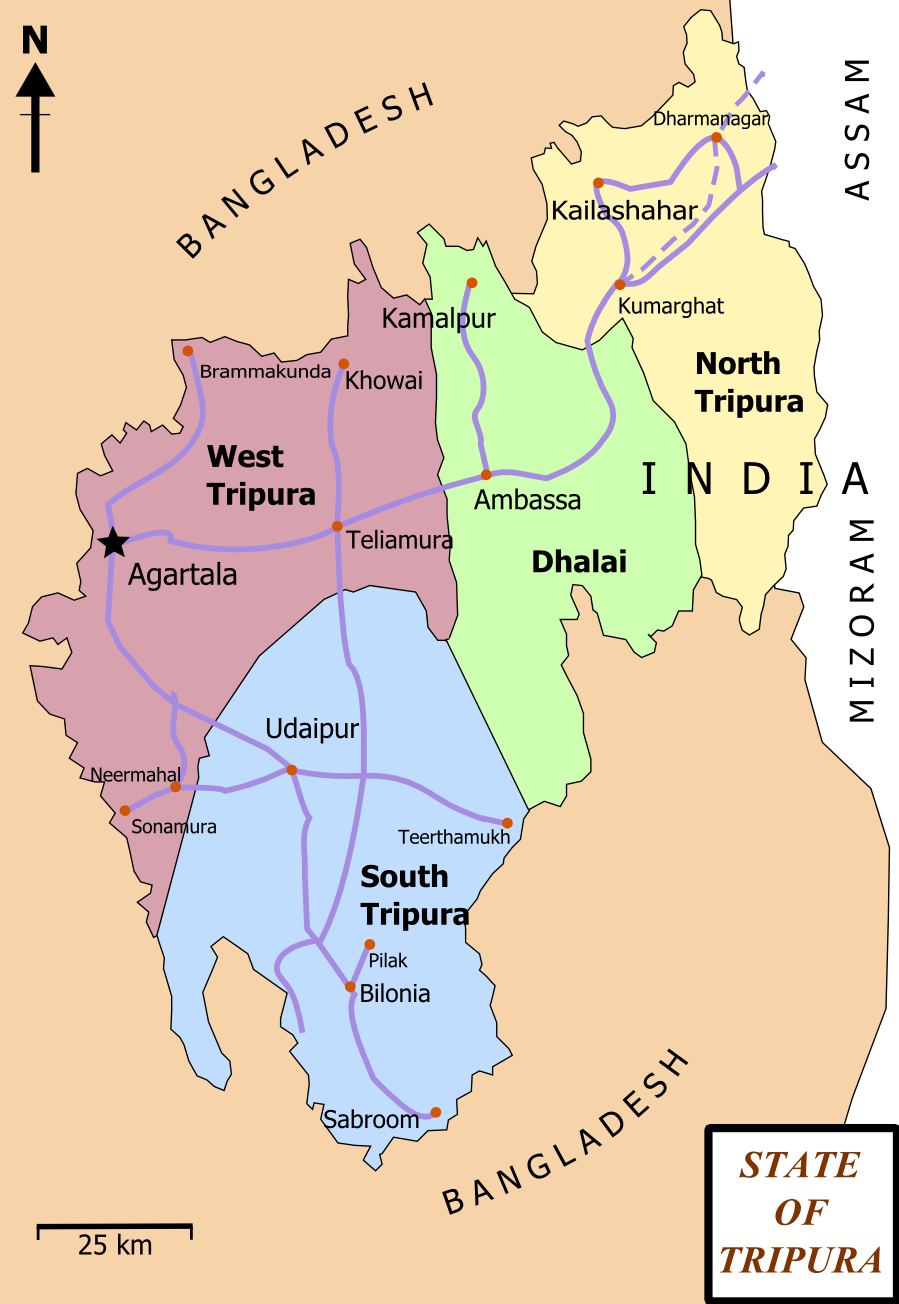
- Tripura District Map
Chief Minister before election
President's rule
Elected Chief Minister
Dasarath Deb
CPI(M)

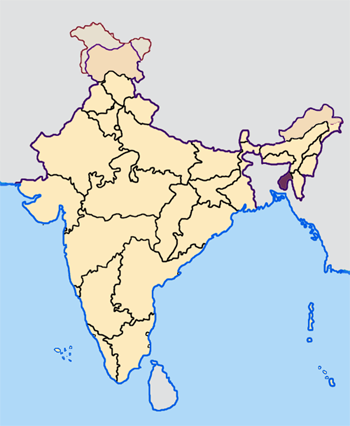
Tripura

The 1993 Tripura Legislative Assembly election took place in a single phase on 15 February 1993 to elect the Members of the Legislative Assembly (MLA) from each of the 60 Assembly Constituencies (ACs) in Tripura, India.

The Communist Party of India (Marxist) (CPI(M)), led by Dasarath Deb, won 44 seats and formed a Government in Tripura

== Contesting parties ==
407 candidates registered to contest the election.

Party	Symbol	Alliance	Seats contested
Communist Party of India (Marxist) (CPI(M))		Left Front	51
Communist Party of India (CPI)		Left Front	2
Revolutionary Socialist Party (RSP)		Left Front	2
All India Forward Bloc (AIFB)		Left Front	1
Indian National Congress (INC)		Congress Alliance	46
Tripura Upajati Juba Samiti (TUJS)		Congress Alliance	14
Amra Bangali			42
Bharatiya Janata Party (BJP)			38
Janata Dal (B)			2
Indian People's Front			2
Independents (IND)			207
Total			407

== Highlights ==
Election to the Tripura Legislative Assembly were held on February 15, 1993. The election were held in a single phase for all the 60 assembly constituencies.

=== Participating Political Parties ===
==== National Parties ====
- BJP (Bharatiya Janata Party)
- CPI (Communist Party of India)
- CPM (Communist Party of India (Marxist))
- INC (Indian National Congress)
- JD(B) (Janata Dal(B))

==== State Parties ====
- FBL (All India Forward Bloc)
- RSP (Revolutionary Socialist Party)
- TUS (Tripura Upajati Juba Samiti)

=== No. of constituencies ===
Type of Constituencies	GEN	SC	ST	Total
No. of Constituencies	33	7	20	60

=== Electors ===
	Men	Women	Total
No.of Electors	855,052	817,976	1,673,028
No.of Electors who Voted	707,725	650,519	1,358,244
Polling Percentage	82.77%	79.53%	81.18%

=== Performance of women candidates ===
	Men	Women	Total
No.of Contestants	393	14	407
Elected	59	01	60

== Result ==
Party	Seats contested	Seats won	No. of votes	% of votes	1988 Seats
Communist Party of India (Marxist)	51	44	599,943	44.78%	26
Indian National Congress	46	10	438,561	32.73%	25
Revolutionary Socialist Party	2	2	21,235	1.58%	2
Tripura Upajati Juba Samiti	14	1	100,742	7.52%	-
Janata Dal(B)	2	1	20,981	1.57%	-
All India Forward Block	1	1	10,658	0.80%	0
Bharatiya Janata Party	38	0	27,078	2.02%	0
Amra Bangali	42	0	19,592	1.46%	-
Communist Party of India	2	0	18,058	1.35%	0
Independents	207	1	82,541	6.16%	0
Total	407	60	1,339,838		
Source: ECI

=== Results by constituency ===
Winner, runner-up, voter turnout, and victory margin in every constituency
Assembly Constituency		Turnout	Winner				Runner Up				Margin
#k	Names	%	Candidate	Party	Votes	%	Candidate	Party	Votes	%	Margin
1	Simna	81.26%	Pranab Debbarma	CPI(M)	12,156	63.56%	Rabindra Debbarma	TUS	6,274	32.81%	5,882
2	Mohanpur	81.41%	Ratan Lal Nath	INC	9,717	46.25%	Akhil Chandra Debnath	CPI(M)	9,657	45.96%	60
3	Bamutia	83.61%	Haricharan Sarkar	CPI(M)	11,683	51.28%	Prakash Chandra Das	INC	10,645	46.73%	1,038
4	Barjala	78.26%	Arun Bhowmik	JD	13,483	43.98%	Dipak Kumar Roy	INC	10,709	34.93%	2,774
5	Khayerpur	83.28%	Pabitra Kar	CPI(M)	13,022	50.07%	Ratan Lal Ghosh	INC	12,565	48.32%	457
6	Agartala	77.73%	Nripen Chakraborty	CPI(M)	15,792	52.11%	Sudip Roy Barman	INC	12,863	42.44%	2,929
7	Ramnagar	77.52%	Surajit Datta	INC	12,862	53.67%	Chhaya Baul	CPI(M)	10,018	41.8%	2,844
8	Town Bordowali	75.94%	Brajagopal Roy	AIFB	10,658	51.66%	Purnima Bhattacharjee	INC	9,404	45.58%	1,254
9	Banamalipur	74.66%	Ratan Chakraborty	INC	8,583	49.17%	Dulal Das Gupta	JD	7,498	42.96%	1,085
10	Majlishpur	81.52%	Dipak Nag	INC	11,729	50.7%	Manik Dey	CPI(M)	11,018	47.62%	711
11	Mandaibazar	75.79%	Rashiram Debbarma	CPI(M)	14,142	61.52%	Shyama Charan Tripura	TUS	7,471	32.5%	6,671
12	Takarjala	79.44%	Kartik Kanya Debbarma	CPI(M)	10,783	51.42%	Sukhendu Debbarma	TUS	5,715	27.25%	5,068
13	Pratapgarh	81.32%	Anil Sarkar	CPI(M)	21,629	57.45%	Madhusudan Das	INC	14,581	38.73%	7,048
14	Badharghat	80.62%	Jadab Majumder	CPI(M)	19,563	51.55%	Dilip Sarkar	INC	17,096	45.05%	2,467
15	Kamalasagar	80.16%	Matilal Sarkar	INC	10,813	52.53%	Narayan Chandra Chowdhury	CPI(M)	9,339	45.37%	1,474
16	Bishalgarh	85.25%	Samir Ranjan Barman	INC	16,404	74.83%	Bhanu Lal Saha	CPI(M)	4,634	21.14%	11,770
17	Golaghati	77.87%	Niranjan Debbarma	CPI(M)	10,465	50.29%	Budha Debbarma	TUS	7,251	34.85%	3,214
18	Charilam	76.84%	Ahok Debbarma	INC	10,292	47.09%	Aghore Debbarma	CPI	9,628	44.05%	664
19	Boxanagar	84.48%	Sahid Chowdhury	CPI(M)	11,161	56.71%	Tahera Begum	INC	6,858	34.85%	4,303
20	Nalchar	85.31%	Sukumar Barman	CPI(M)	10,526	52.65%	Narayan Das	INC	9,108	45.56%	1,418
21	Sonamura	85.55%	Subal Rudra	CPI(M)	11,181	54.22%	Rashik Lal Roy	INC	8,218	39.85%	2,963
22	Dhanpur	84.55%	Samar Chowdhury	CPI(M)	13,327	58.43%	Gopal Chandra Roy	INC	9,212	40.39%	4,115
23	Ramchandraghat	84.22%	Dasarath Deb	CPI(M)	12,790	78.54%	Dinesh Debbarma	TUS	2,374	14.58%	10,416
24	Khowai	88.54%	Samir Deb Sarkar	CPI(M)	9,579	49.97%	Sukhamoy Kar	INC	8,986	46.88%	593
25	Asharambari	81.43%	Bidya Chandra Debbarma	CPI(M)	14,820	80.26%	Sudhir Debbarma	INC	2,407	13.04%	12,413
26	Pramodenagar	82.77%	Aghore Debbarma	CPI(M)	15,013	65.75%	Biswajit Deb Rankhal	INC	7,569	33.15%	7,444
27	Kalyanpur	82.9%	Makhan Lal Chakraborty	CPI(M)	9,832	49.23%	Kajal Chandra Das	INC	8,695	43.54%	1,137
28	Krishnapur	78.12%	Khagendra Jamatia	CPI(M)	13,850	70.38%	Karna Singh Jamatia	TUS	5,051	25.67%	8,799
29	Teliamura	81.45%	Jitendra Sarkar	CPI(M)	11,028	49.91%	Ashok Kumar Baidya	INC	7,092	32.1%	3,936
30	Bagma	84.33%	Rati Mohan Jamaitia	TUS	9,899	45.65%	Saral Pada Jamatia	Independent	9,056	41.76%	843
31	Salgarh	84.74%	Gopal Chandra Das	RSP	11,286	50.97%	Kamini Kumar Das	INC	10,080	45.52%	1,206
32	Radhakishorpur	82.41%	Pannalal Ghosh	RSP	9,949	49.15%	Ranjit Singha Roy	Independent	5,573	27.53%	4,376
33	Matarbari	86.34%	Madhab Chandra Saha	CPI(M)	11,566	49.94%	Kashiram Reang	INC	10,247	44.25%	1,319
34	Kakraban	83.02%	Kashab Chandra Majumder	CPI(M)	11,202	54.1%	Subrata Dhar	INC	5,782	27.93%	5,420
35	Rajnagar	86.1%	Sudhan Das	CPI(M)	14,964	54.57%	Sefali Das	INC	12,067	44.%	2,897
36	Belonia	86.92%	Amal Mallik	INC	14,985	62.3%	Sunil Baran Das Gupta	CPI	8,430	35.05%	6,555
37	Santirbazar	82.16%	Baju Ban Riyan	CPI(M)	13,242	50.46%	Gouri Sankar Reang	TUS	12,879	49.07%	363
38	Hrishyamukh	86.16%	Dilip Chowdhury	INC	15,420	64.26%	Badal Chowdhury	CPI(M)	8,422	35.1%	6,998
39	Jolaibari	82.45%	Brajendra Mog Chowdhury	INC	9,385	51.9%	Gitamohan Tripura	CPI(M)	8,357	46.21%	1,028
40	Manu	85.01%	Jitendra Chaudhury	CPI(M)	14,886	54.93%	Angju Mog	INC	12,212	45.07%	2,674
41	Sabroom	86.5%	Sunil Kumar Chowdhury	CPI(M)	12,714	52.%	Parimal Nandy	INC	11,451	46.83%	1,263
42	Ampinagar	79.67%	Debabrata Koloy	Independent	11,488	53.19%	Nagendra Jamatia	TUS	9,060	41.95%	2,428
43	Birganj	85.51%	Ranjit Debnath	CPI(M)	12,704	48.64%	Jawhar Shaha	INC	11,046	42.29%	1,658
44	Raima Valley	80.5%	Ananda Mohan Roaja	CPI(M)	13,426	54.22%	Rabindra Debbarma	TUS	11,134	44.97%	2,292
45	Kamalpur	87.58%	Bimal Singha	CPI(M)	10,100	55.74%	Saroj Kumar Charkaborty	INC	7,159	39.51%	2,941
46	Surma	84.25%	Sudhir Das	CPI(M)	11,477	56.64%	Sushendra Malakar	INC	7,901	38.99%	3,576
47	Salema	81.98%	Prasanta Debbarma	CPI(M)	12,683	61.9%	Mangal Prasad Debbarma	TUS	6,138	29.96%	6,545
48	Kulai	78.17%	Hasmai Reang	CPI(M)	13,010	57.61%	Diba Chandra Hiangkhwal	TUS	7,319	32.41%	5,691
49	Chawamanu	74.65%	Purna Mohan Tripura	CPI(M)	10,442	60.87%	Shyama Charan Tripura	TUS	4,428	25.81%	6,014
50	Pabiachhara	75.51%	Bidhu Bhusan Malakar	CPI(M)	13,322	59.78%	Brajendra Das	INC	8,102	36.36%	5,220
51	Fatikroy	81.96%	Bhudeb Bhattacharya	CPI(M)	11,742	57.61%	Sunil Chandra Das	INC	6,706	32.9%	5,036
52	Chandipur	83.41%	Baidyanath Majumdar	CPI(M)	12,656	58.43%	Nirode Baran Das	INC	7,662	35.38%	4,994
53	Kailashahar	83.61%	Tapan Chakraborty	CPI(M)	11,592	49.%	Birajit Sinha	INC	11,126	47.03%	466
54	Kurti	76.31%	Faizur Rahaman	CPI(M)	10,352	52.89%	Abdul Rokib	INC	4,929	25.18%	5,423
55	Kadamtala	75.37%	Umesh Chandra Nath	CPI(M)	6,792	35.2%	Jyotirmoy Nath	INC	4,909	25.44%	1,883
56	Dharmanagar	77.35%	Amitabha Datta	CPI(M)	10,310	46.37%	Kalidas Dutta	INC	7,745	34.83%	2,565
57	Jubarajnagar	82.79%	Ramendra Chandra Debnath	CPI(M)	10,228	51.24%	Biva Nath	INC	7,732	38.74%	2,496
58	Pencharthal	73.35%	Anil Chakma	CPI(M)	8,990	41.76%	Sushil Kumar Chakma	INC	5,110	23.74%	3,880
59	Panisagar	74.27%	Subodh Chandra Das	CPI(M)	8,528	47.82%	Ashutosh Das	INC	6,643	37.25%	1,885
60	Kanchanpur	73.79%	Len Prasad Malsai	CPI(M)	9,228	46.95%	Drao Kumar Reang	TUS	5,749	29.25%	3,479

== Government formation ==
The Communist Party of India (Marxist) (CPI(M)), led by Dasarath Deb, won 44 seats and formed a Government in Tripura.
