= Jitendra Lal Das =

Indian politician

Member of the Tripura Legislative Assembly
- In office 1972–1977
- Preceded by: U. K. Roy
- Succeeded by: Jyotirmoy Das
- Constituency: Belonia

Personal details
- Party: Communist Party of India

Jitendra Lal Das popularly known as Junu Das was an Indian politician and a leader of the Communist Party of India. He was a member of the Tripura Legislative Assembly, representing the Belonia constituency from 1972 to 1977. He was one of the founding members of the AISF. He was elected as Secretary of the CPI Tripura State Council in the year 1972, a post which he held until his death in 1992.
