= 2026 Tripura Tribal Areas Autonomous District Council election =

2026 election in TTAADC

- 12 April 2026

28 out of 30 seats in the Tripura Tribal Areas Autonomous District Council 15 seats needed for a majority
- Registered: 9,62,697 (▲11.29%)
- Turnout: 83.52% (▼4.38 pp)
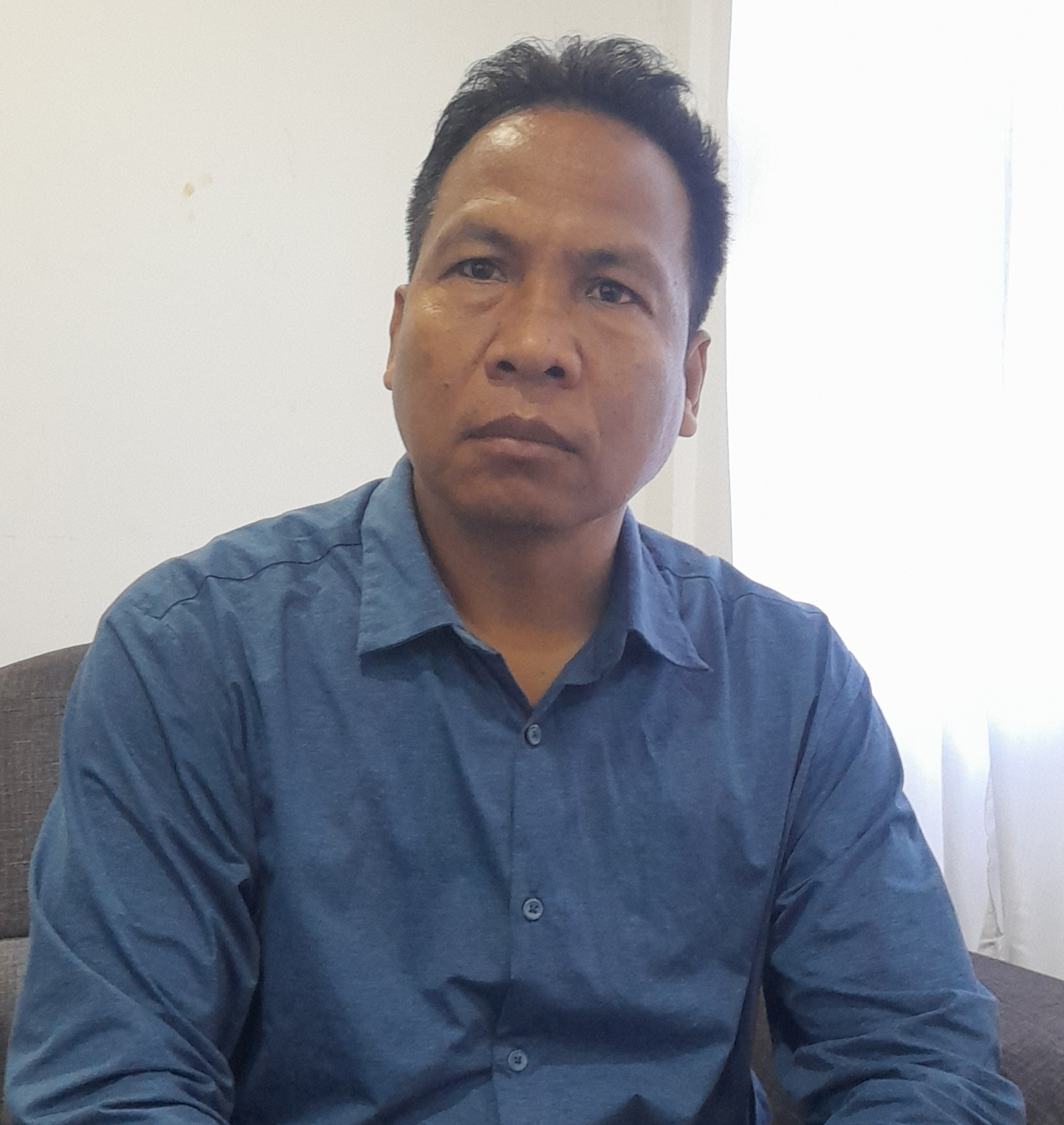

	Majority party	Minority party
Leader	Purna Chandra Jamatia	Bipin Debbarma
Party	TMP	BJP
Leader since	2021	2021
Leader's seat	Killa–Bagma	Demchhara–Kachuchhara (lost)
Last election	46.73%, 18 seats	18.72%, 9 seats
Seats won	24	4
Seat change	▲6	▼5
party vote	457,943	218,072
Percentage	57.62%	27.44%
Swing	▲10.89 pp	▲8.72 pp
Chief Executive Member before election
Purna Chandra Jamatia
TMP
Elected Chief Executive Member
Runiel Debbarma
TMP

The District Council elections were held in TTAADC on 12 April 2026 to elect all 28 members of the Tripura Tribal Areas Autonomous District Council. 25 of the 28 elected seats in the Autonomous District Council are reserved for Scheduled Tribes. The votes were counted and the results were declared on 17 April 2026.

The election resulted in a landslide victory for the Tipra Motha Party, which secured 24 of the 28 elected seats and secured 57.62% of the total votes polled. Despite being ally of the Bharatiya Janata Party in the state and national elections, it decided to contest on its own in the district council polls. The Bharatiya Janata Party won the remaining 4 seats and increased its vote share by 8 percent to 27.44% but its number of seats decreased.

The Left Front which had ruled the council for many years, drew a blank for a second consecutive time. The alliance could not even secure 10% of the votes polled and did even come second in any seat.

== Background ==
The tenure of Tripura Tribal Areas Autonomous District Council is scheduled to end on 18 April 2026. The previous elections were held on 6 April 2021. After the election Tipra Motha Party formed the government and Purna Chandra Jamatia sworn in as the chief executive member. The 15 year ruling CPI(M) led Left Front were wiped out in the previous election. The Bharatiya Janata Party had emerged as the second largest party.

On 24 March 2026, the current Executive member Ananta Debbarma and seating MDC Sadagar Kalai left Tipra Motha Party and joined Bharatiya Janata Party.

== Schedule ==
The State Election Commission of Tripura announced the schedule for the election on 17 March 2026.

Poll event	Schedule
Notification date	18 March 2026
Last date for filing nomination	25 March 2026
Scrutiny of nomination	26 March 2026
Last date for withdrawal of nomination	28 March 2026
Date of poll	12 April 2026
Date of counting of votes	17 April 2026
Deadline for the completion of election process	18 April 2026

== Voter statistics ==
According to the State Election Commission of Tripura, 9,62,697 voters were eligible to vote in the district council elections in TTAADC. This includes 4,82,025 male, 4,80,666 female, and 6 third gender voters.

== Parties and alliances ==
=== Tipra Motha Party ===
Despite its alliance with the Bharatiya Janata Party in the state, the Tipra Motha Party decided to contest the election independently after seat-sharing negotiations failed.

Tipra Motha Party
Party	Flag	Symbol	Leader	Seats contested
Tipra Motha Party			Pradyot Bikram Manikya Deb Barma	28

=== National Democratic Alliance ===
The Tipra Motha Party and Indigenous People's Front of Tripura left the Bharatiya Janata Party led National Democratic Alliance following unsuccessful seat-sharing talks and BJP announced to contest solo. However, they are still alliance in Legislative Assembly.

Party	Flag	Symbol	Leader	Seats contested
Bharatiya Janata Party			Manik Saha	28
Total				28

=== Left Front ===
Left Front
Party	Flag	Symbol	Leader	Seats contested
Communist Party of India (Marxist)			Jitendra Chaudhury	25
All India Forward Bloc			Paresh Chandra Sarkar	1
Communist Party of India			Milan Baidya	1
Revolutionary Socialist Party (India)			Dipak Deb	1
Total				28

=== Indian National Congress ===
Party	Flag	Symbol	Leader	Seats contested
Indian National Congress			Ashish Kumar Saha	28

=== Others ===
Party	Flag	Symbol	Leader	Seats contested
Indigenous People's Front of Tripura			Prem Kumar Reang	26

== Candidates ==
The Bharatiya Janata Party released its 28 candidates list on 24 March 2026.

The Tipra Motha Party released the list of 28 candidates on 24 March 2026.

The Left Front released 27 candidates on 9 March 2026, 25 are from CPI(M), 1 each from RSP and CPI the second list of 1 candidate for All India Forward Bloc on 18 March.

The Indigenous People's Front of Tripura released the first list of 9 candidates on 22 March 2026. The second list of 17 candidates released on 25 March 2026.

The Indian National Congress released a list of 28 candidates on 23 March 2026, including one seat allocated to its ally party Tripura Peoples Party.

No.	Constituency	Reservation	TMP		BJP		Left Front		INC	
No.	Constituency	Reservation	Party	Candidate	Party	Candidate	Party	Candidate	Party	Candidate
1	Damchharra–Jampui	ST	TMP	Bhaba Ranjan Reang	BJP	Rabindra Reang	CPI(M)	Barendra Reang	INC	Ramanjay Reang
2	Machmara	None	TMP	Swapan Kumar Chakma	BJP	Manju Rani Sarkar	AIFB	Paresh Chandra Sarkar	INC	Arjun Roy
3	Dasda–Kanchanpur	None	TMP	Umasankar Reang	BJP	Sailendra Nath	CPI(M)	Ramakanta Nath	INC	Jatibrata Deb
4	Karamchhara	ST	TMP	Ratish Tripura	BJP	Bimal Kanti Chakma	CPI(M)	Sadhan Chakma	INC	Dhirendra Debbarma
5	Chhawmanu	ST	TMP	Hangsa Kumar Tripura	BJP	Esmel Joy Tripura	CPI(M)	Khusiram Tripura	INC	Surjalal Chakma
6	Manu–Chailengta	None	TMP	Hollywood Chakma	BJP	Sukesh Datta Barua	CPI(M)	Rahul Das	INC	Ratan Paul
7	Demchhara–Kachuchhara	ST	TMP	Dhirendra Debbarma	BJP	Bipin Debbarma	CPI(M)	Badarbhum Halam	INC	Harinath Debbarma
8	Ganganagar–Gandachhara	ST	TMP	Khtrojoy Reang	BJP	Bhumika Nanda Reang	CPI(M)	Dhanchamani Reang	INC	Dinaram Reang
9	Halahali–Asharambari	ST	TMP	Prasmit Debbarma	BJP	Ananta Debbarma	CPI(M)	Karim Debbarma	INC	Pranab Debbarma
10	Kulai–Champahour	ST	TMP	Rajeswar Debbarma	BJP	Bimal Debbarma	CPI(M)	Atul Debbarma	INC	Kamendra Reang
11	Maharanipur–Teliamura	ST	TMP	Utpal Debbarma (Uomthai)	BJP	Billow Jamatia	CPI(M)	Ratan Kishore Jamatia	INC	Shyamal Debbarma
12	Ramchandraghat	ST	TMP	James Debbarma	BJP	Devid Debbarma	CPI(M)	Samaresh Debbarma	INC	Amalen Debbarma
13	Simna–Tamakari	ST	TMP	Rabindra Debbarma	BJP	Indrajit Debbarma	CPI(M)	Amulya Debbarma	TPP	Ananta Orang
14	Bodhjungnagar–Wakkinagar	ST	TMP	Runiel Debbarma	BJP	Ranabir Debbarma	CPI(M)	Sanjit Debbarma	INC	Tapan Debbarma
15	Jirania	ST	TMP	Jagadish Debbarma	BJP	Abhijit Debbarma	CPI(M)	Radhacharan Debbarma	INC	Champa Debbarma
16	Mandainagar–Pulinpur	ST	TMP	Jiten Debbarma	BJP	Rajesh Debbarma	CPI(M)	Surjya Debbarma	INC	Bikash Debbarma
17	Pekuarjala–Janmejoynagar	ST	TMP	Gita Debbarma	BJP	Majee Debbarma	CPI(M)	Brajalal Debbarma	INC	Dinesh Debbarma
18	Takarjala–Jampaijala	ST	TMP	Suraj Debbarma	BJP	Nirmal Debbarma	CPI(M)	Benilal Debbarma	INC	Binod Debbarma
19	Amtali–Golaghati	ST	TMP	Buddha Kumar Debbarma	BJP	Kanuraj Debbarma	CPI(M)	Brinda Debbarma	INC	Kesharam Debbarma
20	Killa–Bagma	ST	TMP	Purna Chandra Jamatia	BJP	Amar Jamatia	CPI(M)	Amrita Sadhan Jamatia	INC	Arat Bahadur Molsom
21	Maharani–Chelagang	ST	TMP	Chandra Kumar Jamatia	BJP	Samrat Jamatia	RSP	Haradhan Jamatia	INC	Sadhan Jamatia
22	Kathalia–Mirja–Rajapur	ST	TMP	David Murasing	BJP	Padma Lochan Tripura	CPI(M)	Parikshit Murasing	INC	Bhuiya Lila Noatia
23	Ampinagar	ST	TMP	Kamal Kalai	BJP	Sadagar Kalai	CPI(M)	Prithwiraj Koloi	INC	Falindra Jamatia
24	Raima Valley	ST	TMP	Dhananjoy Tripura	BJP	Samir Ranjan Tripura	CPI(M)	Sumati Ranjan Chakma	INC	Suresh Tripura
25	Nutanbazar–Malbasa	ST	TMP	Sujoy Uchoi	BJP	Abindra Reang	CPI(M)	Magendra Reang	INC	Jitendra Reang
26	Birchandranagar–Kalashi	ST	TMP	Kenaram Reang	BJP	Sanjib Reang	CPI	Narendra Reang	INC	Abraham Reang
27	Purba Muhuripur–Buratali	ST	TMP	Debajit Tripura	BJP	Abhijit Tripura	CPI(M)	Barjung Tripura	INC	Bihan Tripura
28	Silachhari–Manubankul	ST	TMP	Manindra Tripura	BJP	Kanijaong Mog	CPI(M)	Uchathoi Mog	INC	Kejari Mog

== Voting Turnout ==
According to the State Election Commission of Tripura, voting turnout was 83.74% for male voters, 83.30% for female voters, and 16.67% for third gender voters. Total voter turnout was 83.52%.

By constituency
DC Constituency	Vote %
Damchharra-Jampui (ST)	69.09%
Machmara	80.98%
Dasda-Kanchanpur	79.46%
Karamchhara (ST)	81.36%
Chhawmanu (ST)	82.83%
Manu-Chailengta	83.62%
Demchara-Kachuchharra (ST)	83.05%
Ganganagar-Gandachharra (ST)	81.36%
Halahali-Asharambari (ST)	80.54%
Kulai-Champahour (ST)	83.16%
Maharanipur-Teliamura (ST)	83.77%
Ramchandraghat (ST)	84.46%
Simna-Tamakari (ST)	85.31%
Bodhjung Nagar-Wakkinagar (ST)	87.66%
Jirania (ST)	85.77%
Mandainagar-Pulinpur (ST)	83.81%
Pekuarjala-Janmayjaynagar (ST)	87.65%
Takarjala-Jampuijala (ST)	83.50%
Amtali-Golaghati (ST)	85.56%
Killa-Bangma (ST)	84.91%
Maharani-Chellagang (ST)	86.01%
Kathalia-Mirja-Rajapur (ST)	84.66%
Ampinagar (ST)	82.42%
Raima Valley (ST)	85.74%
Natunbazar-Malbasa (ST)	85.89%
Birchandranagar-Kalashi (ST)	85.23%
Purba Mahuripur-Buratali (ST)	89.91%
Silachari-Manubankul (ST)	87.82%
Total	83.52%

== Results ==
=== Result by party ===
Party	TMP	NDA	Nom
Seats	24	4	2

Vote Share by alliance
1. TMP (57.6%)
2. NDA (27.4%)
3. LF (9.91%)
4. UPA (1.93%)
5. IPFT (2.22%)
6. Other (0.88%)

Alliance/ Party		Popular vote			Seats		
Alliance/ Party		Vote	%	±pp	Contested	Won	+/-
Tipra Motha Party		457,943	57.62	▲20.19	28	24	▲8
Bharatiya Janata Party		218,072	27.44	▲8.72	28	4	▼5
Left Front (Tripura)	Communist Party of India (Marxist)	72,335	9.10	▼3.36	25	0	Steady
Left Front (Tripura)	Communist Party of India	3,701	0.47	▼0.20	1	0	Steady
Left Front (Tripura)	All India Forward Bloc	1,522	0.19		1	0	Steady
Left Front (Tripura)	Revolutionary Socialist Party	1,167	0.15		1	0	Steady
Total		78,725	9.91	▼3.32	28	0	Steady
Indigenous People's Front of Tripura		17,664	2.22	▼8.40	26	0	Steady
Indian National Congress	Indian National Congress	15,180	1.91	▼0.33	27	0	Steady
Indian National Congress	Tripura Peoples Party	181	0.02	▲0.02	1	0	Steady
Total		15,361	1.93	▼0.31	28	0	Steady
Independents						0	▼1
NOTA		6,022	0.76	▼0.24			
Total		794,779	100%	—		28	—

=== Constituency wise results ===
Constituency		Winner				Runner Up				Margin
No	Name	Candidate	Party	Votes	%	Candidate	Party	Votes	%	Margin
1	Damchharra-Jampui (ST)	Bhaba Ranjan Reang	TMP	12,836	37.43%	Rabindra Reang	BJP	9,022	26.31%	3,814
2	Machmara	Manju Rani Sarkar	BJP	13,700	48.36%	Swapan Kumar Chakma	TMP	8,981	31.70%	4,719
3	Dasda-Kanchanpur	Shailendra Nath	BJP	13,467	46.46%	Umashankar Reang	TMP	8,482	29.26%	4,985
4	Karamchhara (ST)	Ratish Tripura	TMP	14,348	41.18%	Bimal Kanti Chakma	BJP	12,543	36.00%	1,805
5	Chhawmanu (ST)	Esmel Joy Tripura	BJP	12,789	46.11%	Hangsa Kumar Tripura	TMP	11,091	39.98%	1,698
6	Manu-Chailengta	Hollywood Chakma	TMP	10,809	39.06%	Sukesh Datta Barua	BJP	10,347	37.39%	462
7	Demchara-Kachuchharra (ST)	Dhirendra Debbarma	TMP	17,726	59.72%	Bipin Debbarma	BJP	8,824	29.73%	8,902
8	Ganganagar-Gandachharra (ST)	Khotrojoy Reang	TMP	11,264	44.70%	Bhumikananda Reang	BJP	9,294	36.88%	1,970
9	Halahali-Asharambari (ST)	Prasmit Debbarma	TMP	17,796	63.73%	Ananta Debbarma	BJP	6,136	21.97%	11,660
10	Kulai-Champahour (ST)	Rajeshwar Debbarma	TMP	19,536	68.65%	Bimal Debbarma	BJP	5,542	19.47%	13,994
11	Maharanipur-Teliamura (ST)	Utpal Debbarma	TMP	19,393	72.98%	Billow Jamatia	BJP	5,577	20.99%	13,816
12	Ramchandraghat (ST)	James Debbarma	TMP	20,837	81.57%	Devid Debbarma	BJP	2,650	10.37%	18,187
13	Simna-Tamakari (ST)	Rabindra Debbarma	TMP	17,862	79.82%	Indrajit Debbarma	BJP	2,314	10.34%	15,548
14	Bodhjung Nagar-Wakkinagar (ST)	Runeil Debbarma	TMP	20,055	80.22%	Ranabir Debbarma	BJP	3,985	15.94%	16,070
15	Jirania (ST)	Jagadish Debbarma	TMP	21,500	80.42%	Abhijit Debbarma	BJP	3,066	11.47%	18,434
16	Mandainagar-Pulinpur (ST)	Jitendra Debbarma	TMP	19,033	78.47%	Rajesh Debbarma	BJP	3,294	13.58%	15,739
17	Pekuarjala-Janmayjaynagar (ST)	Gita Debbarma	TMP	22,707	87.87%	Majee Debbarma	BJP	1,884	7.29%	20,823
18	Takarjala-Jampuijala (ST)	Suraj Debbarma	TMP	16,055	89.03%	Nirmal Debbarma	BJP	1,210	6.71%	14,845
19	Amtali-Golaghati (ST)	Buddha Kumar Debbarma	TMP	29,794	85.49%	Kanuraj Debbarma	BJP	2,828	8.12%	26,966
20	Killa-Bangma (ST)	Purna Chandra Jamatia	TMP	17,082	61.73%	Amar Jamatia	BJP	8,174	29.54%	8,908
21	Maharani-Chellagang (ST)	Chandra Kumar Jamatia	TMP	10,329	48.65%	Samrat Jamatia	BJP	8,050	37.92%	2,279
22	Kathalia-Mirja-Rajapur (ST)	David Murasing	TMP	21,608	56.44%	Padma lochan Tripura	BJP	10,954	28.61%	10,654
23	Ampinagar (ST)	Kamal Kalai	TMP	15,278	58.39%	Sadagar Kalai	BJP	4,488	17.15%	10,790
24	Raima Valley (ST)	Dhananjoy Tripura	TMP	11,065	39.21%	Samir Ranjan Tripura	BJP	9,654	34.21%	1,411
25	Natunbazar-Malbasa (ST)	Sujoy Uchoi	TMP	17,284	46.54%	Abindra Reang	BJP	13,088	35.24%	4,196
26	Birchandranagar-Kalashi (ST)	Kenaram Reang	TMP	14,937	46.73%	Sanjib Reang	BJP	11,237	35.16%	3,700
27	Purba Mahuripur-Buratali (ST)	Debajit Tripura	TMP	16,781	48.89%	Abhijit Tripura	BJP	9,990	29.10%	6,791
28	Silachari-Manubankul (ST)	Kangjaong Mog	BJP	13,965	37.98%	Manindra Tripura	TMP	13,474	36.65%	491

== Reactions and aftermath ==
The BJP Tripura claimed, hundreds of its party workers were homeless in post poll violence. However, the Tipra Motha Party has denied any link to the violence.

Just days after the election result Ananta Debbarma rejoined Tipra Motha Party on 21 April 2026, who was left the party before the election and contested against Tipra Motha Party with BJP ticket.

Tipra Motha Party MLA Swapna Debbarma who was among a group of legislators who were reportedly in talks with the BJP ahead of the TTAADC polls. However, prior to the polls, she met party supremo Pradyot Bikram Manikya Deb Barma in Shillong and expressed regret over the developments.

On 27 April 2026, the oath taking ceremony of newly elected members of TTAADC took place at Khumulwng. But the BJP boycotted the oath taking ceremony alleging irregularities in recruitment in the TTAADC. According to the statement of former Lok Sabha MP Rebati Tripura, approximately 120 appointments were made without public notification or adherence to established procedures, and some appointees had already joined their posts.
