= Prasmit Debbarma =

Indian politician

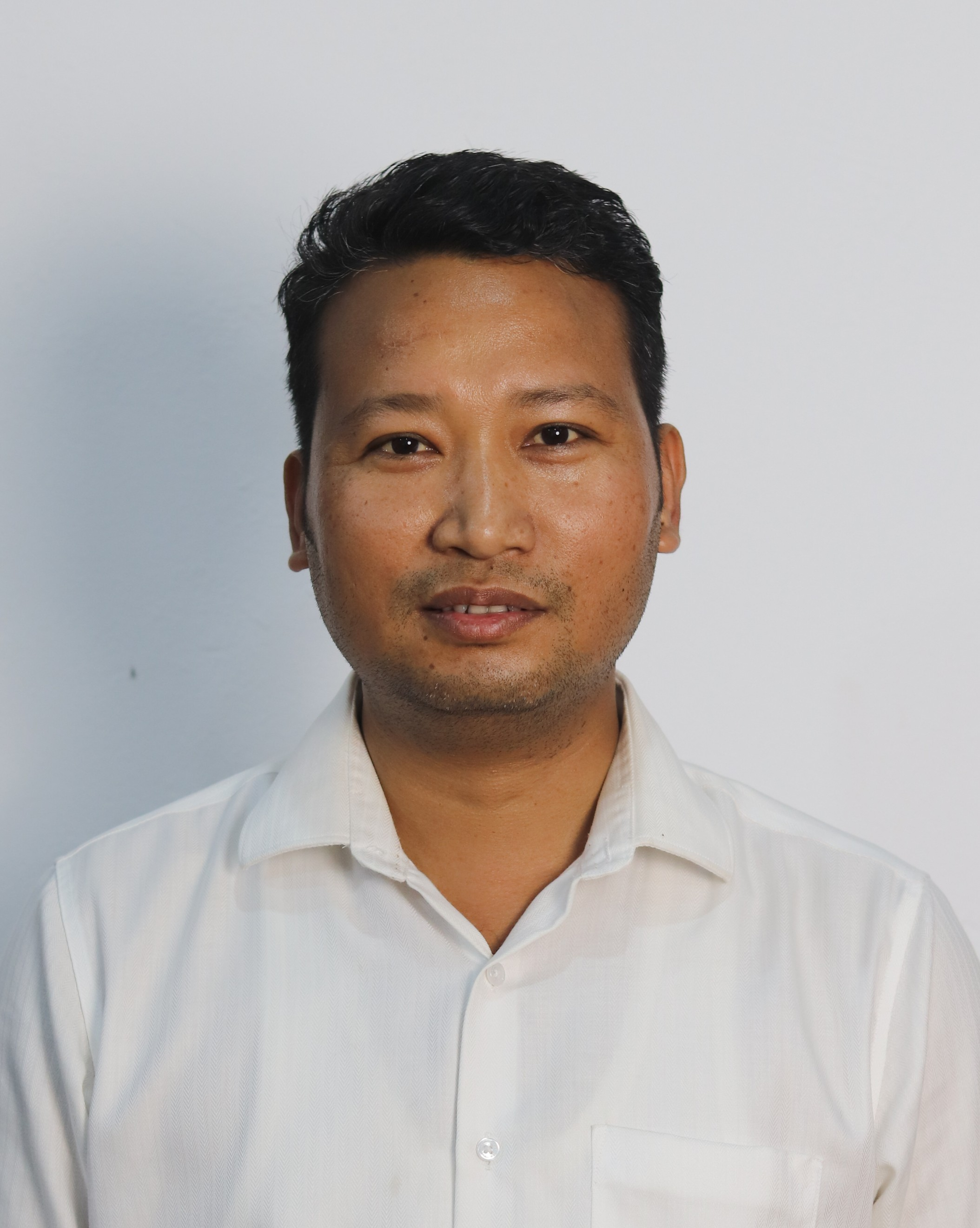

Member of Tripura Tribal Areas Autonomous District Council
- Incumbent
- Assumed office 27 April 2026
- Preceded by: Ananta Debbarma
- Constituency: Halahali-Ashrambari

Personal details
- Born: 5 July 1984 (age 42) Idangkur Shikari, Khowai
- Party: Tipra Motha Party
- Education: Tripura University (MA, M.Com.)
- Occupation: Politician; Teacher

Prasmit Debbarma (born 5 July 1984) is an Indian politician from Tripura. He is a Member of Tripura Tribal Areas Autonomous District Council. He was elected from the Halahali-Ashrambari in the 2026 Tripura Tribal Areas Autonomous District Council election representing the Tipra Motha Party.

== Career ==
Prasmit Debbarma was the working president of Tipra Motha Party youth front Youth Tipra Federation (YTF) and is currently the president of its Khowai District unit. Prior to being elected as Member of District Council of TTAADC, Debbarma worked as at Mare Haduk School from 2010 to 2020.

In the 2026 General Election of TTAADC, Prasmit Debbarma defeated Bharatiya Janata Party candidate Ananta Debbarma by a margin of 11,660 securing 63.73% of the total votes.
