= Rabindra Debbarma =

Indian politician

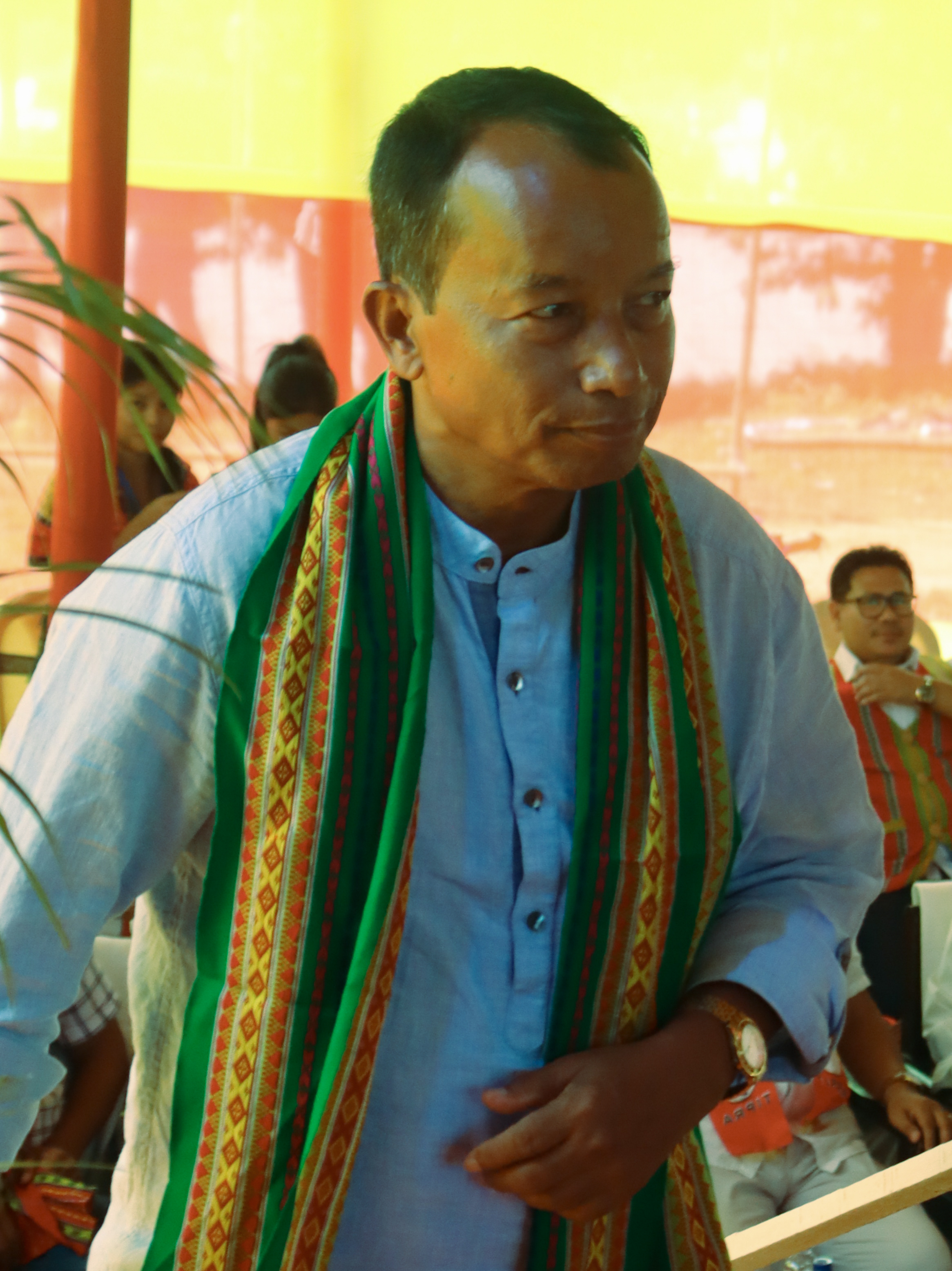
- Rabindra Debbarma in plenary session at Khumulwng on 15 July 2023

Executive Member of Tripura Tribal Areas Autonomous District Council
- In office 19 April 2021 – 6 May 2026
- Departments: Education; Kokborok & Other Indigenous Languages Department.
- Preceded by: Kumodh Debbarma
- Succeeded by: Chandra Kumar Jamatia

Member of District Council Tripura Tribal Areas Autonomous District Council
- Incumbent
- Assumed office 19 April 2021
- Preceded by: Ranabir Debbarma
- Constituency: 13- Simna-Tamakari (ST)

Member of Tripura Legislative Assembly
- In office 1989–1992
- Preceded by: Abhiram Debbarma
- Succeeded by: Pranab Debbarma
- Constituency: Simna

Personal details
- Born: 12 January 1965 (age 61) Boiragi Kami, Sumli Hathai, West Tripura
- Party: TIPRA Motha Party
- Other political affiliations: Indigenous Nationalist Party of Twipra (formerly)
- Spouse: Smt. Kamala Debbarma
- Children: 1

Rabindra Debbarma (born 12 January 1965) is an Indian Tiprasa politician from Tripura who is a former Executive Member of Tripura Tribal Areas Autonomous District Council (TTAADC) from the 13- Simna-Tamakari (ST) constituency. And former Member of Tripura Legislative Assembly. Currently he is also Member of District Council of Tripura Tribal Areas Autonomous District Council from 19 April 2021 and he is currently serves as the Chief Whip of TIPRA Motha Party in the TTAADC.

== Political career ==
Rabindra Debbarma started his political journey as a student leader associated with the Twipra Students' Federation (TSF).

=== Tripura State Legislature ===
He contested the 1988 Tripura Legislative Assembly Election from the Simna Assembly constituency in which he was defeated by CPI (M) candidate Abhiram Debbarma. After Abhiram Debbarma died in 1989, he won the by-election on a TUJS ticket.

Debbarma joined the Indigenous Nationalist Party of Twipra (INPT) after a split in the TUJS. He served as the assistant general secretary of the INPT until it was merged with TIPRA in 2021.

=== Autonomous District Council ===
Rabindra Debbarma contested the 2021 TTAADC election as a TIPRA Motha candidate and won from the Simna-Tamakari constituency. He was appointed as the chief whip of the TTAADC. He was sworn in as an executive member of the TTAADC Government on 18 May 2023.

== Positions held ==
- Chief whip of TTAADC, 2021–till date
- Assistant general secretary, Indigenous Nationalist Party of Twipra till 2021
