= Esmel Joy Tripura =

Indian politician

Member of the Tripura Tribal Areas Autonomous District Council
- Incumbent
- Assumed office 2026
- Constituency: Chhawmanu

Personal details
- Party: Bharatiya Janata Party

Esmel Joy Tripura is an Indian politician from Tripura, India. He is a member of the Tripura Tribal Areas Autonomous District Council (TTAADC) representing the Chhawmanu constituency. He was elected in the 2026 TTAADC election as a candidate of the Bharatiya Janata Party.

== Political career ==
Esmel Joy Tripura contested the 2026 Tripura Tribal Areas Autonomous District Council election from the Chhawmanu constituency as a candidate of the Bharatiya Janata Party and won the seat.

His victory was recorded in the constituency-wise results of the 2026 TTAADC election.

== See also ==
- Tripura Tribal Areas Autonomous District Council
- 2026 Tripura Tribal Areas Autonomous District Council election
- Bharatiya Janata Party
