= Chandra Kumar Jamatia =

Indian Administrative Service officer (born 1965)

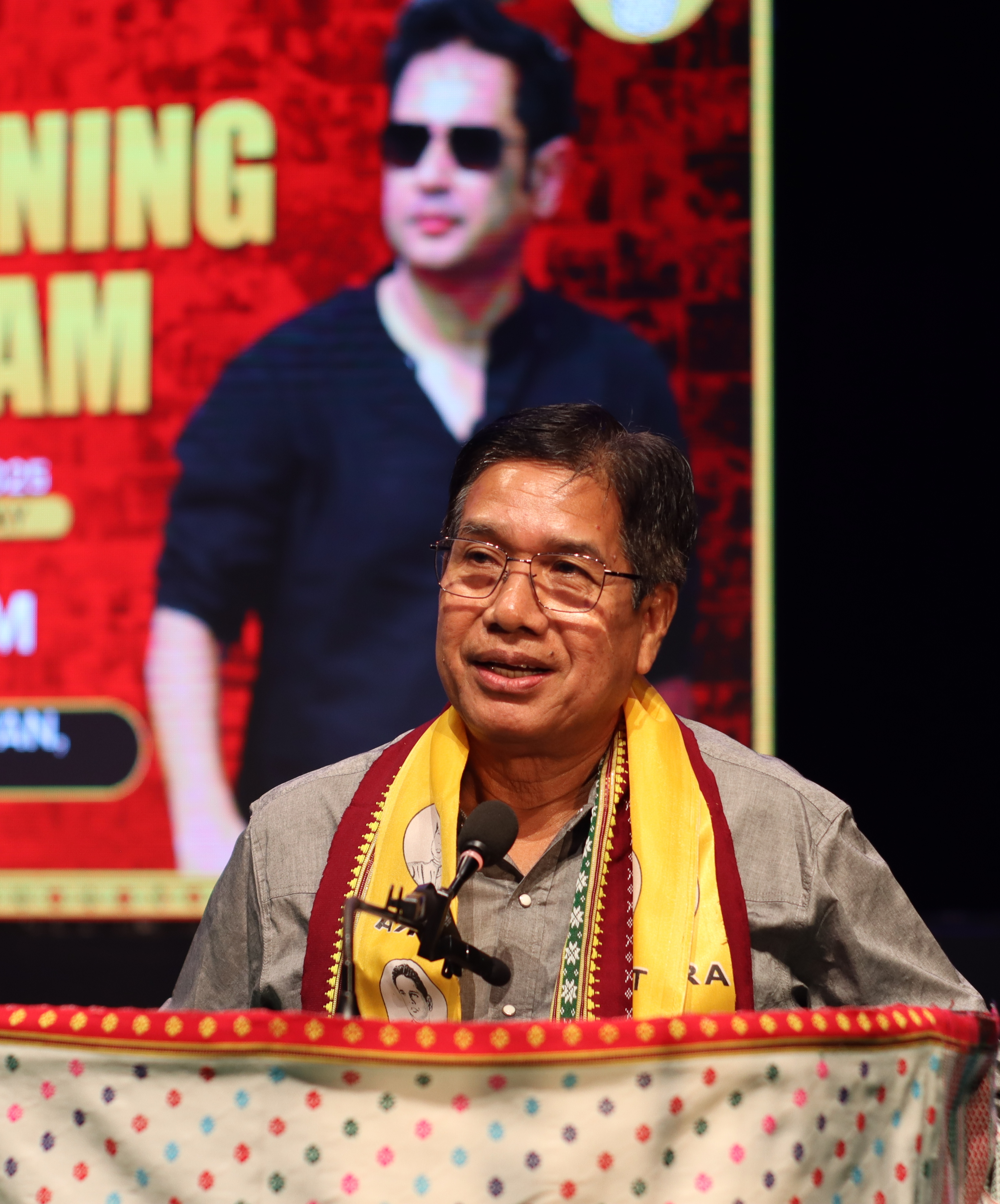
- Jamatia in 2025

Executive Member of Tripura Tribal Areas Autonomous District Council
- Incumbent
- Assumed office 6 May 2026
- Portfolio: Education; Social Welfare & Social Education; Tourism; Kokborok Department & Other Languages
- Preceded by: Rabindra Debbarma

Member of District Council, Tripura Tribal Areas Autonomous District Council
- Incumbent
- Assumed office 27 April 2026
- Preceded by: Samrat Jamatia
- Constituency: 21- Maharani-Chelagang (ST)

Member, Administrative Reforms Committee of Tripura Tribal Areas Autonomous District Council
- Incumbent
- Assumed office 25 July 2025

Personal details
- Born: May 5, 1965 (age 61) Tripura
- Party: Tipra Motha Party
- Education: North-Eastern Hill University (NEHU) (B.A., M.A.)
- Occupation: Politician
- Profession: Former IAS officer

Chandra Kumar Jamatia also known as C. K Jamatia (born 5 May 1965), is an Indian Tiprasa political activist and an Executive Member of TTAADC since 2026. He is a former civil servant Indian Administrative Service officer from Tripura who was the Chief Executive Officer of TTAADC till 2025. He is also the first IAS from the Tiprasa Jamatia people. At present, he is a member of the Administrative Reforms Committee of TTAADC and senior spokesperson of the Tipra Motha Party (TMP).

== Education ==
Jamatia finished his school education in Tripura and later completed his B.A. and M.A. in political science at the North-Eastern Hill University, Shillong, Meghalaya in 1988. He is also known to be the first IAS officer among the Jamatia people of Tripura.

== Career ==
Chandra Kumar Jamatia initially joined the Tripura Civil Service (TCS) and was later promoted to Indian Administrative Service (IAS) 2006 batch. Jamatia was the Director of Tribal Welfare Department, District Magistrate and Collector of several districts like Sepahijala, South Tripura and North Tripura, and Secretary of the General Administration (Printing & Stationery) Department and of the Agriculture and Farmers' Welfare Department, Govt. of Tripura. He retired in May 2025 while CEO of TTAADC from 2021 and Secretary of Transport Department, Government of Tripura.

Jamatia joined the Tipra Motha Party (TMP) in 2025 and was appointed as spokesperson for the party in the same year.

== Political career ==
Chandra Kumar Jamatia was elected from Maharani-Chellagang constituency in the 2026 TTAADC General election.
