= Lalit Mohan Tripura =

Indian politician

Member of Tripura Legislative Assembly
- In office 2008–2018
- Preceded by: Rabindra Debbarma
- Succeeded by: Dhananjoy Tripura
- Constituency: Raima Valley

Personal details
- Born: 1 January 1958 (age 68) Gandachera
- Party: Communist Party of India (Marxist)
- Spouse: Smt. Suyendri Tripura

Lalit Mohan Tripura is an Indian politician and a former member of the Tripura Legislative Assembly for two consecutive terms from 2008 to 2018. He has been a member of Communist Party of India (Marxist) since 1982. In the 2018 Tripura Legislative Assembly election he was defeated by the Indigenous Peoples Front of Tripura candidate Dhananjoy Tripura by a margin of 1,922 votes.
