= Chief Executive Member of the Tripura Tribal Areas Autonomous District Council =

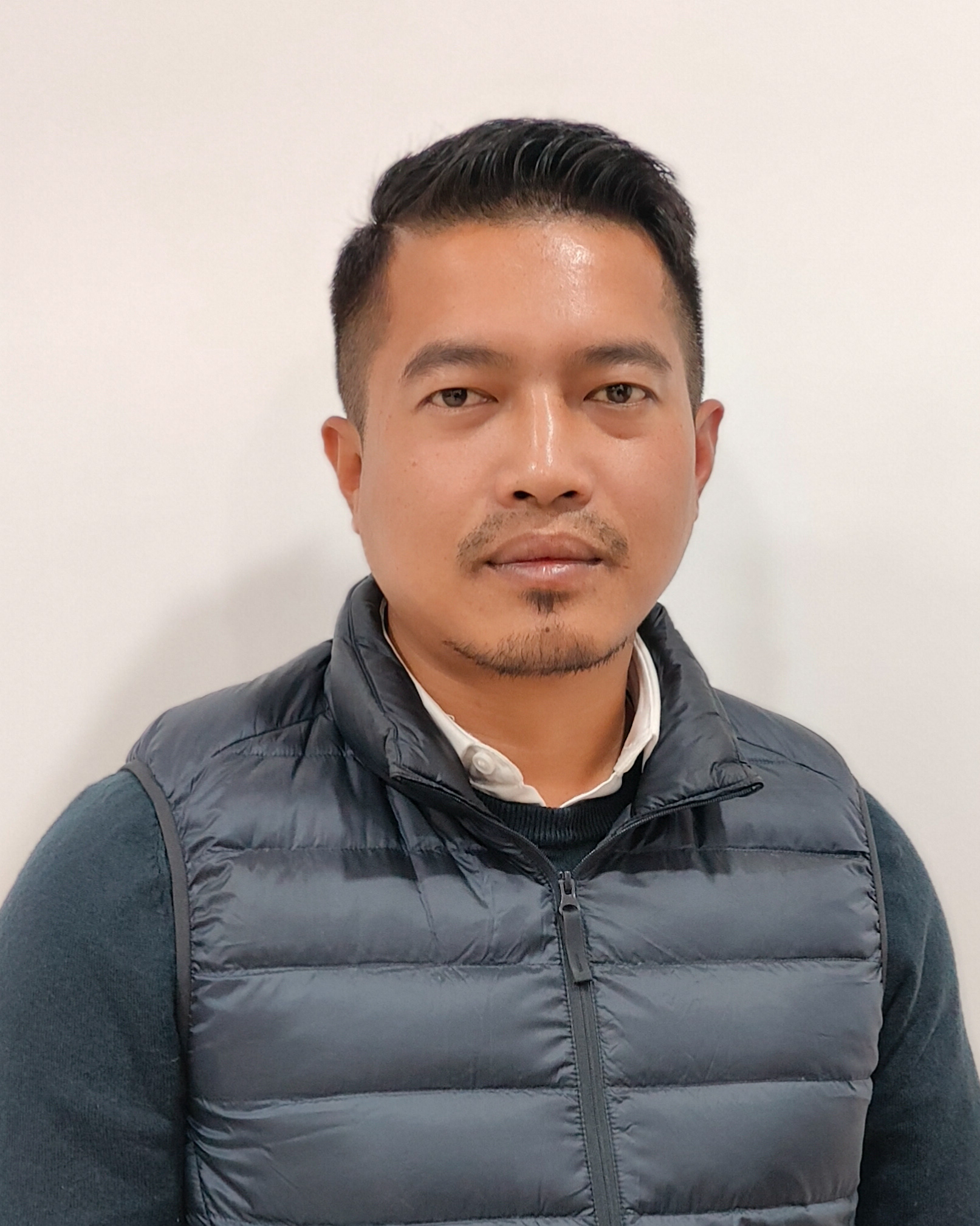
- Incumbent; Runiel Debbarma since 5 May 2026
- Style: The Honourable (formal); Mr. Chief Executive Member (informal)
- Type: Leader of the Executive
- Abbreviation: CEM
- Member of: Tripura Tribal Areas Autonomous District Council; TTAADC Executive Council
- Reports to: Governor of Tripura; Tripura Tribal Areas Autonomous District Council
- Residence: Khumulwng
- Appointer: by convention based on appointees ability to command confidence in the District Council
- Term length: 5 Years
- Inaugural holder: Aghore Debbarma
- Formation: 18 January 1982 (44 years ago)
- Website: https://ttaadc.gov.in/

This is a list of Chief Executive Members of the Tripura Tribal Areas Autonomous District Council, the leader of the Tripura Tribal Areas Autonomous District Council, the autonomous district council in Tripura, India.

The Chief Executive Member is the leader of the TTAADC who presides over the executive committee. He is also the leader of the council. Runiel Debbarma is the incumbent Chief Executive Member of the Tripura Tribal Areas Autonomous District Council.

== Chief Executive Members of TTAADC ==
S. No.	Portrait	Name	Term start	Term end	Party
1		Aghore Debbarma	1985	1990	Communist Party of India (Marxist)
2		Harinath Debbarma	1990	1995	Tripura Upajati Juba Samiti
3			1995	2000	Communist Party of India (Marxist)
4		Debabrata Koloi	3 May 2000	17 August 2002	Indigenous People's Front of Tripura
5		Kripamohan Reang	17 August 2002	21 May 2003	Indigenous People's Front of Tripura
6	N/A	Hirendra Kumar Tripura	2004	2004	Indigenous People's Front of Tripura
7		Buddha Debbarma	2004	5 March 2005	Indigenous People's Front of Tripura
(1)		Aghore Debbarma	5 March 2005	3 May 2008	Communist Party of India (Marxist)
8		Ranjit Debbarma	5 March 2008	3 May 2010	Communist Party of India (Marxist)
8		Ranjit Debbarma	3 May 2010	4 May 2015	Communist Party of India (Marxist)
9		Radhacharan Debbarma	4 May 2015	5 May 2020	Communist Party of India (Marxist)
–		Vacant (Governor's Rule)	5 May 2020	18 April 2021	
10		Purna Chandra Jamatia	19 April 2021	5 May 2026	Tipra Motha Party
11		Runiel Debbarma	5 May 2026	Incumbent	Tipra Motha Party
