= Runiel Debbarma =

Indian politician

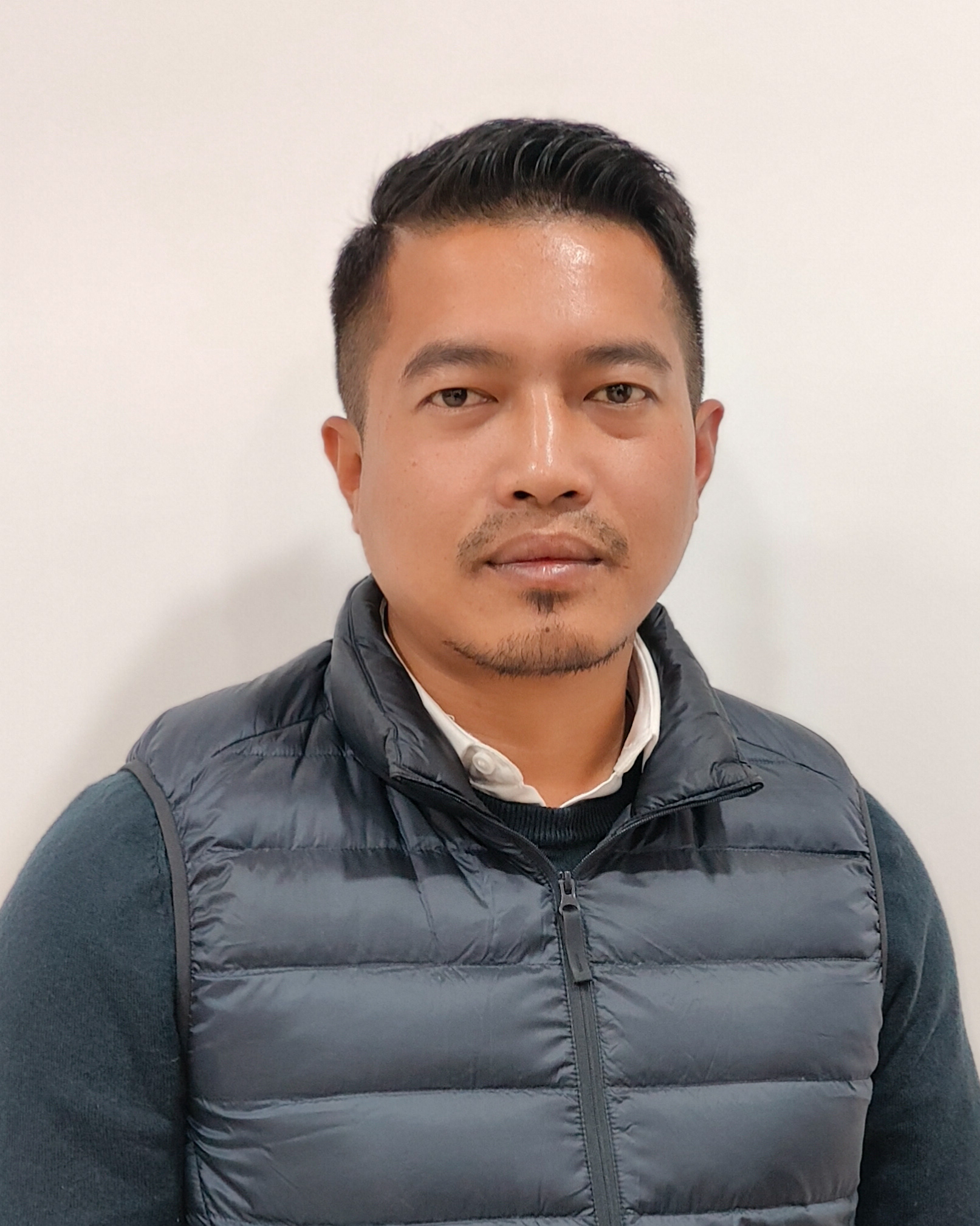
- Debbarma official potrait

Chief Executive Member of the Tripura Tribal Areas Autonomous District Council
- Incumbent
- Assumed office 6 May 2026
- Governor: Indrasena Reddy
- Ministry & Departments: General Administration (including Appointment and Services); Finance; Law; Planning; Village Committee; Industries & Commerce; Tribal Welfare; Agriculture & Horticulture; Forests; Health & Family Welfare; Public Works Department; Rural Development; Co-operatives; LRS; ARDD; Fisheries; Sports and Youth Affairs; Information and Cultural Affairs; Science, Technology & Environment; All policies and any other Department(s) which are allocated to any other Members
- Preceded by: Purna Chandra Jamatia

Executive Member of Tripura Tribal Areas Autonomous District Council
- In office 18 May 2023 – 5 May 2026
- Portfolio: Public Works Department (PWD); Rural Development (RD)

Member of District Council Tripura Tribal Areas Autonomous District Council
- Incumbent
- Assumed office 19 April 2021
- Preceded by: Jahar Debbarma
- Constituency: 14- Bodhjungnagar-Wakkinagar, (ST)

Personal details
- Born: 19 January 1989 (age 37)
- Party: Tipra Motha Party
- Education: Tripura Institute of Technology

Runiel Debbarma (born 19 January 1989) is an Indian Tiprasa politician and the current Chief Executive Member of the Tripura Tribal Areas Autonomous District Council (TTAADC) since 2026. He is a member of the Tipra Motha Party. He was elected from the Budhjungnagar-Wakkinagar District Council constituency since 2021.

== Political career ==
Debbarma was started his political career as a student activist of the Twipra Students Federation. In 2019 Pradyot Bikram Manikya Deb Barma formed a social organisation TIPRA, he was also the founding member of the organisation. In 2021 the organisation became a political party and he won the 2021 Tripura Tribal Areas Autonomous District Council election with the ticket of Tipra Motha Party. In 2023 May 18, he was appointed as Executive member of the TTAADC. Previously he also served as the Youth Tipra Federation president from 2021 to 2024. In 2026 Tripura Tribal Areas Autonomous District Council election he again won with margin of 16,070 votes against BJP candidate.

== Chief Executive Member ==
=== Appointment ===
On 4 May 2026, the Tipra Motha Party held a meeting in Ujjayanta Palace and the elected MDCs of the party unanimously proposed Debbarma as the new CEM.

On 06 May 2026, Debbarma sworn in as Chief Executive Member of Tripura Tribal Areas Autonomous District Council, succeeding Purna Chandra Jamatia.
