= Youth Tipra Federation =

- Abbreviation: YTF
- Formation: 3rd May 2021
- Founded at: Agartala
- Type: Youth wing
- Legal status: Active
- Headquarters: Andhar Mahal, Palace Compound, Agartala
- Region served: India
- President: Suraj Debbarma

Youth Tipra Federation (YTF) is a youth organisation in India. It was founded in 3rd May 2021 by Tipra Motha Party as a youth wing of the party.

== List of Leaders ==
Sl No.	Portrait	President	Duration	
1		Runiel Debbarma	2021	27 July 2024
2		Suraj Debbarma	27 July 2024	present

== Activities ==
- In 20 September 2024, YTF organised a protest demonstration against the attacks on minority and tribal communities in Bangladesh in Agartala.
- As per the article of Northeast Today: In 19 June 2025, the organisation submit memorandum to take action against illegal Bangladeshi in Tripura.
