= Tripura Tribal Areas Autonomous District Council =

Autonomous area in India

Type
- Type: Autonomous District Council
- Term limits: 5 years

Leadership
- Chair: Bhaba Ranjan Reang, TMP
- Chief Executive Member: Runiel Debbarma, TMP
- Deputy Chief Executive Member: Vacant, TMP

Structure
- Seats: 30 MDCs
- Political groups: Government (28): TMP (24); BJP (4); Nominated (2): NOM (2)

Elections
- Voting system: 28 Plurality Voting; 2 nominated by governor of Tripura
- Last election: 12 April 2026
- Next election: April 2031

Meeting place
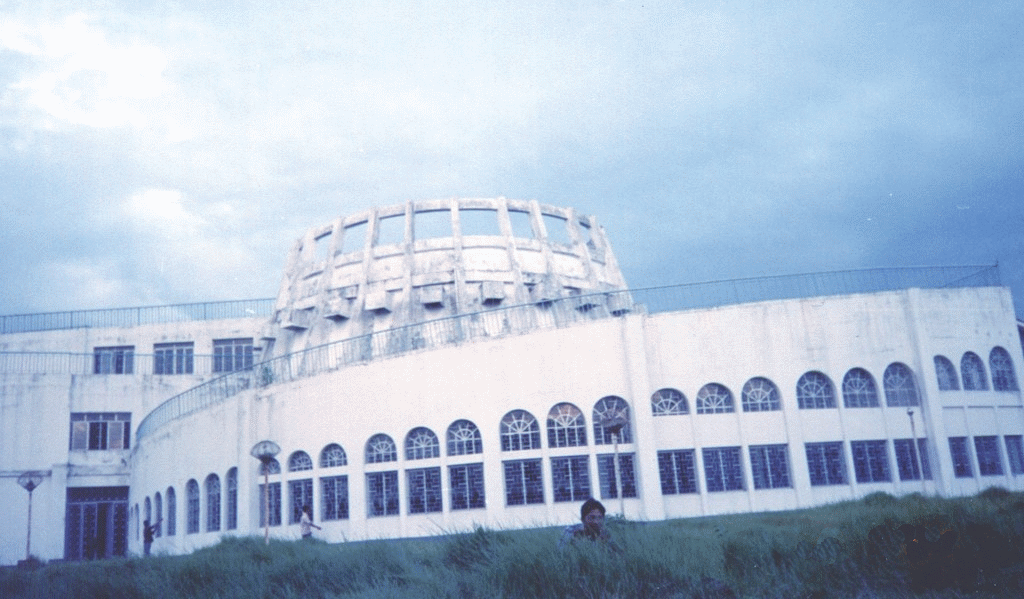
- Council Headquarters, Khumulwng

Website
- ttaadc.gov.in

The Tripura Tribal Areas Autonomous District Council (TTAADC) is an autonomous district council administering the Tiprasa-dominated areas of the state of Tripura, India. Its council and assembly are situated in Khumulwng, a town 26 km away from Agartala, the state capital comprising 68% of the total geographical area of Tripura State. It is a constitutional body under the Sixth schedule of the Indian Constitution.

== History ==
Autonomous District Councils of Northeast India

The Tripura Tribal Areas Autonomous District Council (TTAADC) Act 1979 was passed by the Indian parliament after a series of democratic movements launched by the Indigenous people of Tripura, under the provision of the 6th scheduled of the Indian constitution. The principal objective behind setting up the autonomous district council is to empower the Indigenous people to govern themselves and also to bring all round developments of the backward people so as to protect and preserve their culture, customs, and traditions. But it actually came into being on 15 January 1982 and elected members were sworn in on 18 January 1982. Later, it was upgraded under the provision of the 6th schedule of the Indian constitution by the 49th constitution (Amendment) act, 1984; with effect from 1 April 1985.

== Total area ==
The total area of the TTAADC is 7,132.56 km^{2}., which covers about 68% of the total area (10,491 km^{2}) of the state.

About 70% of land under TTAADC is covered by hilly forest, whereas all the plain cultivable land including all the districts and sub-divisional headquarters are outside the purview of.

== Population ==
The population of the TTAADC area is 12,16,465 out of which the Scheduled Tribes are 10,21,560, i.e. 83.4% of the population in the TTAADC area.

In the total population of 3,673,917 of Tripura (as per 2011 census) the total population of Scheduled Tribes is 1,166,813 (31.76%). Therefore, the number of Scheduled Tribes of the state who reside in the TTAADC area is 87.55% of the total Indigenous population of Tripura.

== Executive branch ==
=== Executive Committeee ===
TTAADC has a regular administrative structure. The Executive committee composed of 10 members and chief executive officer (CEO) is the head of the Administration. The executive powers are vested with the executive committee, which is headed by the Chief Executive Member (CEM), who is elected from among the Treasury Bench members.

The Sixth Schedule to the Constitution of India provides ample powers to the district council for self-Governance of the Indigenous Tipra population of the state. The district council has its own powers to appoint its own staff in terms of requirement and appointment rules. The council administration is headed by the chief executive officer and a deputy chief executive officer of TCS Grade-I and 6 executive officers, for executive departments such as Administration, Finance, Rural Development, Planning and Coordination etc.

The Executive committee of the TTAADC was formed by notification of the CEO on 23 April 2021 by TIPRA, the winning party alliance after getting elected and installed by the Governor of the state. The list of the Executive members are as follows:

S.No	Name	Constituency	Portfolios	Party
Chief Executive Member
1.	Runiel Debbarma	Bodhjungnagar-Wakhinagar	General Administration (including Appointment and service); Finance; Planning; Public Works Department (PWD); Rural Development (RD); Information and Cultural Affairs (ICA); All policies and any other Department(s) which are not allocated to any members.	TMP
Executive Members
2.	Chandra Kumar Jamatia	Maharani-Chellagang	Education; Law; Tribal Welfare; Tourism	TMP
3.	Kamal Kalai	Ampinagar	Agriculture; Horticulture; Village Committee; Kokborok Department & OML	TMP
4.	Rajeshwar Debbarma	Kulai-Champahour	Health; Land Records & Settlement (LRS)	TMP
5.	Kenaram Reang	Birchandranagar-Kalashi	Industry	TMP
6.	Kangjaong Mog	Silachari-Manubankul	Forest; Cooperation	BJP
7.	Debajit Tripura	Purba Mahuripur-Buratali	Sports and Youth Affairs	TMP
8.	Hollywood Chakma	Manu-Chailengta	Fisheries; Social Welfare & Social Education; Purba Mahuripur-Buratali	TMP
9.	David Murasing	Kathalia-Mirja-Rajapur	Animal Resources Development Department; Science & Technology	TMP

=== Administrative structure ===
Administration of TTAADC and its subordinate offices are managed from its headquarters in Khumulwng, West Tripura. Chief Executive Officer, TTAADC is responsible for day to day administrative functions who is further supported by Addl CEO, Dy CEO and a number of Principal Officers and Executive Officers. At grassroots level, there are 527 Village Committees functioning as primary units as institutions of local self governance similar to Gram Panchayats in Non- ADC areas. For administrative supervision, the TTAADC has following field offices as indicated in Table below.

Sl. No.	Institution	Numbers
1.	Zonal Development Office	10
2.	Sub Zonal Development Office	44
3.	Engineering Division Office	11
4.	Engineering Sub-Division	22
5.	School Inspectorate Office	25
6.	Inspectorate of Social Education	04
7.	Education Sector Offices	34
8.	Village Committees	587

=== Departments ===
There are different departments headed by a Principal Officer as the departmental head . The departments are:

1. Agriculture & Horticulture
2. Animal Resources Development Department (ARDD)
3. Co-Operatives
4. Education
5. Finance
6. Fisheries
7. Forests
8. General Administration
9. Health and Family Welfare (H&FW)
10. Industries
11. Kokborok and other Indigenous Department
12. Land Records and Settlement (LRS)
13. Law
14. Sports & Youth Programme (S&YP)
15. Tribal Welfare (TW)
16. Village Committee
17. Planning
18. Public Works Department (PWD)
19. Information and Cultural Affairs & Tourism (ICAT)
20. Rural Development (RD)
21. Social Welfare & Social Education (SW&SE)
22. Science, Technology, and Environment

==== Zonal Development Office ====
There are eight Zonal Development Offices along with 44 Sub-Zonal Development Offices for the development works of Tripura Tribal Areas Autonomous District Council areas. There are also Zonal Advisory Committee having one chairman and eight Committee Members in each zone.

Sl. No.	Name of Zone	Headquarter
1.	West Zone	Khumulwng, West Tripura
2.	South Zone	Birchandra Manu, South Tripura
3.	Dhalai Zone	Sikari, Dhalai, Tripura
4.	North Zone	Kanchanpur, North Tripura
5.	Khowai Zone	West Tripura
6.	Gomati Zone	Killa, Gomati Tripura
7.	Unokoti Zone	Rajkandi, Unokoti Tripura
8.	SipahijalaI Zone	Takarjala, Sipahijala Tripura

==== Sub-Zonal Development Office ====
The Sub-Zonal Development Offices are as follows :

1. Khumulwng
2. Belbari
3. Sumili
4. Dakdu Twisa
5. Hezamara
6. Abhicharan
7. Mandwi
8. Baijalbari
9. Mungiakami
10. Twimadhu
11. Bachaibari
12. Tulasikok
13. Duski
14. Mohanbhog
15. Bishramganj
16. Promodh Nagar
17. Jampuijala
18. Gabordi
19. BC Manu
20. Kaladepa
21. Manubankul
22. Ratanpur
23. Kalsimukh
24. Dalak
25. Gurakappa
26. Killa
27. Ampi
28. Garjee
29. Marandi
30. Gandacharra
31. Raisyabari
32. Gonganagar
33. Sikaribari
34. Ambasa
35. Chawmanu
36. Manu
37. Maharani
38. Dumacharra
39. Vangmun
40. Dasda
41. Noagang
42. Laljuri
43. Rajkandi
44. Machmara

== Legislative branch ==
The TTAADC is governed by a council which has 30 members. Out of 30 members, 28 members are elected through adult suffrage, while 2 members are nominated by the governor of Tripura. Out of 28 elected seats, 25 are reserved for Scheduled Tribes who are the Indigenous Tipra-people of Tripura.

The Legislative Department of the district council is headed by the chairman, who summons the meeting of the council from time to time in connection with approval of budget, discussion on bills, rules and regulations submitted by the treasury bench and passing of the same thereof.

The council consists of 30 members, out of which 28 members are elected by adult franchise and 2 members are nominated by the governor of Tripura.

The chairman has his own secretariat headed by the secretary to the district council.

=== Elections ===
The details of various elections are as follows:

- 1985 TTAADC Election
- 1990 TTAADC Election
- 1995 TTAADC Election
- 2000 TTAADC Election
- 2005 TTAADC Election
- 2010 TTAADC Election
- 2015 TTAADC Election
- 2021 TTAADC Election
- 2026 TTAADC Election

=== Constituencies ===
The name of the constituencies i.e. total 30 members out of which are elected by adult franchise and 2 members are as follows.

No.	Constituency	Category	Elected MDCs	Party	Remarks
1	Damchharra-Jampui	ST	Bhaba Ranjan Reang	TMP	
2	Machmara	Unreserved	Manju Rani Sarkar	BJP	
3	Dasda-Kanchanpur	Unreserved	Shailendra Nath	BJP	
4	Karamchharra	ST	Ratish Tripura	TMP	
5	Chhawmanu	ST	Esmel Joy Tripura	BJP	
6	Manu-Chailengta	Unreserved	Hollywood Chakma	TMP	
7	Demchara-Kachucharra	ST	Dhirendra Debbarma	TMP	
8	Ganganagar-Gandachharra	ST	Khotrojoy Reang	TMP	
9	Hala Hali-Asharambari	ST	Prasmit Debbarma	TMP	
10	Kulai-Champahour	ST	Rajeshwar Debbarma	TMP	
11	Maharanipur-Teliamura	ST	Utpal Debbarma	TMP	
12	Ramchandra Ghat	ST	James Debbarma	TMP	
13	Simna-Tamakari	ST	Rabindra Debbarma	TMP	
14	Budhjung Nagar-Wakkinagar	ST	Runiel Debbarma	TMP	
15	Jirania	ST	Jagadish Debbarma	TMP	
r16	Mandainagar-Pulinpur	ST	Jiten Debbarma	TMP	
17	Pekuarjala-Janmejaynagar	ST	Gita Debbarma	TMP	
18	Takarjala-Jampuijala	ST	Suraj Debbarma	TMP	
19	Amtali-Golaghati	ST	Buddha Kumar Debbarma	TMP	
20	Killa-Bagma	ST	Purna Chandra Jamatia	TMP	
21	Maharani-Chellagang	ST	Chandra Kumar Jamatia	TMP	
22	Kathalia-Mirja-Rajapur	ST	David Murasing	TMP	
23	Ampinagar	ST	Kamal Kalai	TMP	
24	Raima Valley	ST	Dhananjoy Tripura	TMP	
25	Natunbazar-Malbasa	ST	Sujoy Uchoi	TMP	
26	Birchandranagar-Kalashi	ST	Kenaram Reang	TMP	
27	Purba Mahuripur-Buratali	ST	Debajit Tripura	TMP	
28	Silachari-Manubankul	ST	Kangjaong Mog	BJP	
29	Nominated Member			Nominated	
30	Nominated Member			Nominated	

== Judicial branch ==
Paragraph 4 and 5 of the Sixth Schedule provides for administration of justice in Autonomous areas. Under the above paragraphs, the ADCs are empowered to constitute Courts for trials of cases between parties belonging to Scheduled Tribe Communities.

== General Powers ==
=== Administrative ===
A) The following matters are under the exclusive control and administration of the council:

1. Allotment, occupation, use or using a part of land other than reserved forests
2. Management of forests not being reserved forest
3. Use of canal water & water course for agriculture
4. Jhum
5. Village committee
6. Any other matter relating to administration including public health and sanitation

B) The Council may establish or manage:

1. Primary schools
2. Dispensaries
3. Markets
4. Cattle pounds
5. Fisheries
6. Ferries
7. Roads
8. Road transport and waterways

C) The Government may entrust functions relating to the following matters to the Council:

1. Agriculture
2. Animal Resource Development
3. Community Projects
4. Co-operative Societies
5. Social Welfare
6. Village Planning
7. Fisheries
8. Plantations
9. Any other matter to which the executive power of the state extends

=== Legal ===
A) The council has Powers to frame laws in the following matters with the approval of Governor:

1. Inheritance of property of schedule tribes
2. Marriage and divorce where any party belongs to a schedule tribes
3. Social customs of schedule tribes
4. Allotment, occupation, use or setting apart of all lands other than reserve forests
5. Management of forest other than reserve forest
6. Use of canal or water courses for purposes of agriculture
7. Jhum
8. Village committees
9. Any other matter relating to administration including public health and sanitation

B) The Council may regulate and control:

1. Money lending
2. Trade

C) The Council may, with previous approval of the Government make regulation for administration and control of:

1. Primary schools
2. Dispensaries
3. Markets
4. Cattle pounds
5. Ferries
6. Fisheries
7. Roads
8. Road transport and waterways

=== Financial ===
A) The Council shall get a share of:

1. Forest royalties
2. Royalties accruing each year from licensing or lease for the purpose of projecting for, or the extraction of minerals granted by the state government

B) The Council shall have the powers to levy and collect the taxes:

1. For maintenance of schools, dispensaries or roads
2. On entry of goods into markets and tolls on passengers and goods carried in ferries
3. On animals, vehicles and boats
4. On professional trades, callings and employments

== Relationship with panchayats ==
Before the establishment of the district council, villages included in its jurisdiction had Gram panchayats like the rest of the state. Following the establishment of the council, Tripura Panchayat Raj Act ceased to operate in that area and there was no village level body- elected or otherwise. In 2006, the State Government decided to hold elections to the Village Councils by treating them on par with village Panchayats in other parts of the State taking the view that nothing in Sixth Schedule precludes such a course of action. The Autonomous Council is, however, as of 2009, yet to transfer any functions to these newly established Councils.

== Rural Development Blocks within TTAADC ==
West Tripura district

- Lefunga
- Hezamara
- Jampuijola
- Mandwi
- Belbari
- Mungiakami
- Padmabil
- Tulashikhor
- Bishramganj Amtali/Gulaghati

North Tripura district

- Damcherra
- Jampui Hill
- Pecharthal^{[†]}
- Dasda

South Tripura district

- Ompinagar
- Killa
- Karbook
- Rupaichhori

Dhalai district

- Chhawmanu
- Manu
- Dumburnagar
- Salema
- Ambassa
- Ganganagar
- Raisyabari

^†(Pecharthal RD Block was created bifurcating the Dasda RD Block on 28 November 1994. At that time this block consisted of 22 (Twenty Two) Nos. ADC Villages. On 1 April 1999, this block was again bifurcated and Damcherra RD Block was created comprising 9 (Nine) Nos. ADC Villages. Thereafter, Pecharthal RD Block consisted of 13 Nos. ADC Villages and again 1 (One) ADC Village namely Joymanipara ADC Village has been excluded from Pecharthal RD Block in recent re-organization of District and Sub-Divisions. At present, Pecharthal RD Block consists of 12 (Twelve) Nos. of ADC Villages under Kumarghat Sub-Division, Unakoti District (w.e.f. 01-01-2012 ). The Block area is mainly dominated by Chakma Tribes, other Sub-Tribes found in this Block area are Reang, Tripuri and Darlong community.)

== Election ==
Presently, with the result of 2026 ADC election held at 12 April, Tipra Motha Party has emerged as the majority with 24 seats. This is the second consecutive win of the Tipra Motha Party which was formed by former Tripura Civil Services Officer & Presently Member Tripura State Legislative Assembly Chitta Ranjan Debbarma from Ambassa (ST) Assembly Constituency. The Chairman of Tipra Motha Party, Pradyot Bikram Manikya was speculated to become the CEM in 2021 of the newly elected Council. However, Purna Chandra Jamatia was chosen as the Chief Executive Member of the Tripura Tribal Areas Autonomous District Council for the first time in 2021 and re-elected in 2026.

In the 2005 elections to the TTAADC the Left Front won 24 seats out of the 28 elected seats and the Indigenous Nationalist Party of Twipra four. The Left Front and INPT had contested within the framework of an electoral understanding.

The term of the previous council ended on 17 May 2020 and following the postponement of elections for a result of the global COVID-19 pandemic, TTAADC was put under Governor's rule until a new council can be elected. However, in the 2021 ADC election the Left Front has drawn blank failing to win a single seat. Tipra Motha Party (TMP) was formed in 2023 just one month before the state assembly elections of Tripura won 18 seats. The BJP won 9 seats. Ref. Election commission of India.

In 2026 elections, Tipra Motha Party (TMP) won 24 of 28 seats and BJP won remaining 4.

The TTAADC is set to be renamed the Tipra Territorial Council (TTC), as part of a general reorganization which will also expand the council's powers and increase the number of seats on it from 28 elected and 2 appointed to 44 elected and 6 appointed.

== See also ==
- 2026 Tripura Tribal Areas Autonomous District Council election
- 2021 Tripura Tribal Areas Autonomous District Council election
- Kokborok
- Tripuri Dances
- Tripuri people
- North Eastern Council
- Hill tribes of Northeast India
