= Nandita Debbarma =

Member of 13th Tripura Assembly

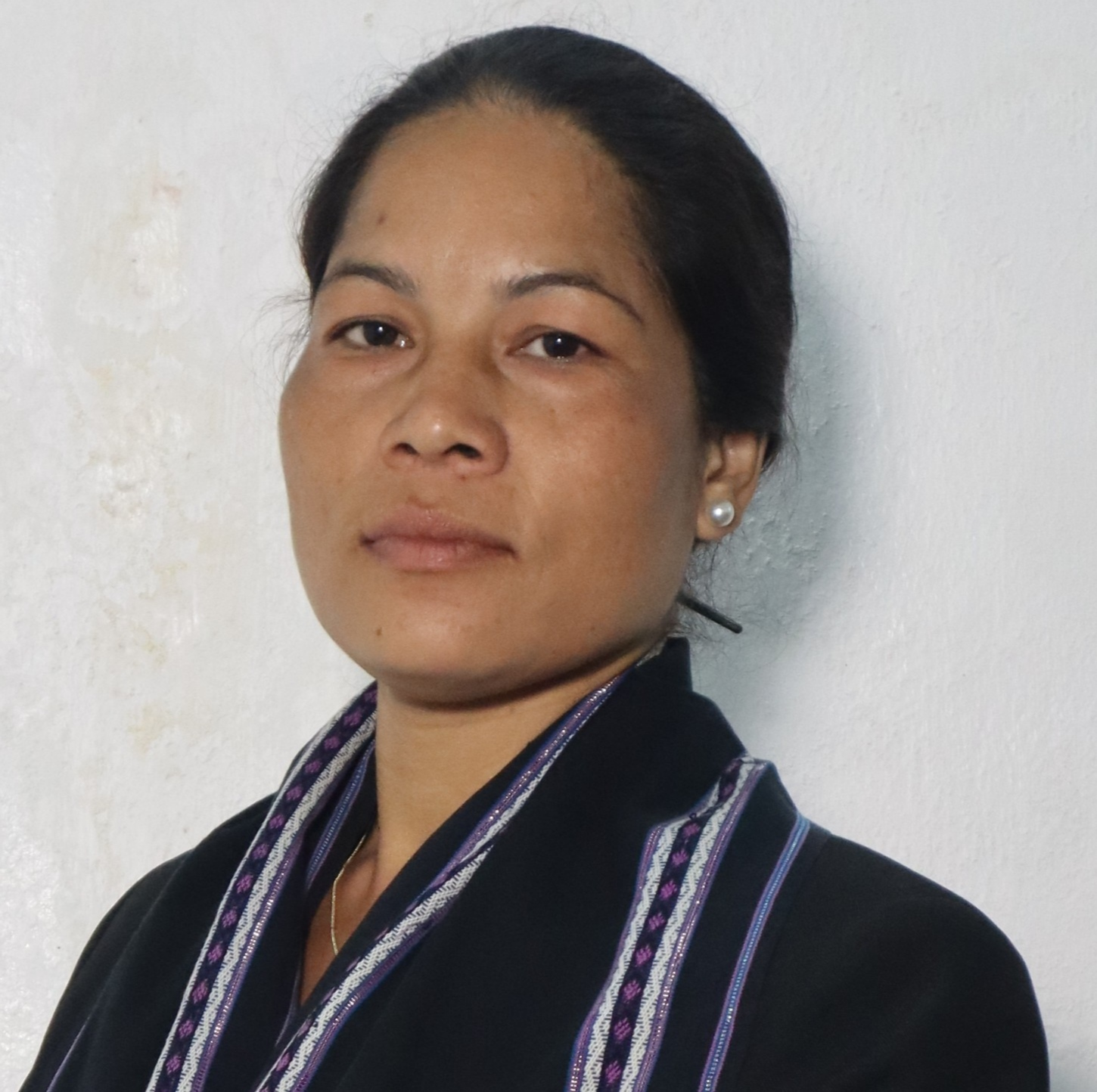
- Nandita Debbarma Reang in 2023

Member of the Tripura Legislative Assembly
- Incumbent
- Assumed office 2023
- Constituency: Raima Valley

Personal details
- Born: 6 December 1983 (age 42)
- Citizenship: Indian
- Party: Tipra Motha Party
- Occupation: Housewife
- Profession: Politician

Nandita Debbarma Reang is an Indian politician of the Tipra Motha Party. She is a member of the 2023 Tripura Legislative Assembly, representing the Raima Valley Assembly constituency.

== Political career ==
Nandita Debbarma Reang became the first woman legislator from the Raima Valley constituency. On July 7, 2023, Nandita was suspended from a Tripura Legislative Assembly budget session along with 5 others after staging a protest.
