= Raima Valley Assembly constituency =

Legislative Assembly constituency in Tripura State, India

Coordinates: 23.81°N 91.28°E

Raima Valley
- Constituency No. 44 for the Tripura Legislative Assembly

Constituency details
- Country: India
- Region: Northeast India
- State: Tripura
- District: Dhalai
- Lok Sabha constituency: Tripura East
- Established: 1977
- Total electors: 53,421
- Reservation: ST

Member of Legislative Assembly
- 13th Tripura Legislative Assembly
- Incumbent Nandita Debbarma
- Party: TMP
- Alliance: NDA
- Elected year: 2023

Raima Valley is one of the 60 Legislative Assembly constituencies of Tripura state in India.

It is part of Dhalai district and is reserved for candidates belonging to the Scheduled Tribes.

== Members of the Legislative Assembly ==
Election	Member	Party
1977	Baju Ban Riyan	Communist Party of India
1983	Rabindra Debbarma	Tripura Upajati Juba Samiti
1988	Rabindra Debbarma	Tripura Upajati Juba Samiti
1993	Ananda Mohan Roaja	Communist Party of India
1998	Rabindra Debbarma	Tripura Upajati Juba Samiti
2003	Rabindra Debbarma	Indigenous Nationalist Party of Twipra
2008	Lalit Mohan Tripura	Communist Party of India
2013	Lalit Mohan Tripura	Communist Party of India
2018	Dhananjoy Tripura	Indigenous People's Front of Tripura
2023	Nandita Debbarma	Tipra Motha Party

== Election results ==
=== 2023 Assembly election ===
2023 Tripura Legislative Assembly election: Raima Valley
Party	Candidate	Votes	%	±%
TMP	Nandita Debbarma	19,269	40.66%	New
BJP	Bikash Chakma	15,827	33.40%	New
CPI(M)	Pabin Tripura	11,339	23.93%	▼18.17
NOTA	None of the Above	958	2.02%	▲0.55
Margin of victory		3,442	7.26%	▲2.43
Turnout		47,393	90.11%	▼2.91
Registered electors		53,421		▲23.00
TMP gain from IPFT		Swing	▼6.27	

=== 2018 Assembly election ===
2018 Tripura Legislative Assembly election: Raima Valley
Party	Candidate	Votes	%	±%
IPFT	Dhananjoy Tripura	18,673	46.93%	▲45.07
CPI(M)	Lalit Mohan Tripura	16,751	42.10%	▼9.89
INPT	Shib Chandra Debbarma	1,815	4.56%	▼39.36
Tripura Peoples Party	Khagendra Reang	840	2.11%	New
NOTA	None of the Above	584	1.47%	New
INC	Bakul Bikash Chakma	476	1.20%	New
Tipraland State Party	Nakendra Chakma	377	0.95%	New
Margin of victory		1,922	4.83%	▼3.24
Turnout		39,793	91.07%	▼0.72
Registered electors		43,430		▲12.54
IPFT gain from CPI(M)		Swing	▼5.06	

=== 2013 Assembly election ===
2013 Tripura Legislative Assembly election: Raima Valley
Party	Candidate	Votes	%	±%
CPI(M)	Lalit Mohan Tripura	18,527	51.99%	▼0.59
INPT	Nakshatra Jamatia	15,651	43.92%	▲1.97
Independent	Bugerai Reang	798	2.24%	New
IPFT	Rajendra Reang	662	1.86%	New
Margin of victory		2,876	8.07%	▼2.55
Turnout		35,638	92.51%	▲0.05
Registered electors		38,592		
CPI(M) hold		Swing	▼0.59	

=== 2008 Assembly election ===
2008 Tripura Legislative Assembly election: Raima Valley
Party	Candidate	Votes	%	±%
CPI(M)	Lalit Mohan Tripura	19,120	52.58%	▲5.13
INPT	Rabindra Debbarma	15,256	41.95%	▼6.03
Independent	Sindhu Mani Tripura	649	1.78%	New
NCP	Nalini Bhagya Chakma	474	1.30%	▼0.58
LJP	Achai Khasrang Jamatia	362	1.00%	New
CPI(ML)L	Falguni Tripura	273	0.75%	▼1.95
Independent	Prabir Kumar Kalai	233	0.64%	New
Margin of victory		3,864	10.63%	▲10.09
Turnout		36,367	92.39%	▲18.18
Registered electors		39,404		
CPI(M) gain from INPT		Swing	▲4.60	

=== 2003 Assembly election ===
2003 Tripura Legislative Assembly election: Raima Valley
Party	Candidate	Votes	%	±%
INPT	Rabindra Debbarma	13,483	47.98%	New
CPI(M)	Lalit Mohan Tripura	13,334	47.45%	▲3.74
CPI(ML)L	Sumanta Mohan Tripura	758	2.70%	New
NCP	Pakhi Tripura	529	1.88%	New
Margin of victory		149	0.53%	▼9.15
Turnout		28,104	74.13%	▲0.32
Registered electors		37,921		▲15.03
INPT gain from TUS		Swing	▼5.41	

=== 1998 Assembly election ===
1998 Tripura Legislative Assembly election: Raima Valley
Party	Candidate	Votes	%	±%
TUS	Rabindra Debbarma	12,987	53.39%	▲8.42
CPI(M)	Ananda Mohan Roaja	10,631	43.70%	▼10.52
BJP	Ashok Mitra Chakma	340	1.40%	New
Independent	Pakhi Tripura	286	1.18%	New
Margin of victory		2,356	9.68%	▲0.43
Turnout		24,327	75.73%	▼5.56
Registered electors		32,967		▲5.66
TUS gain from CPI(M)		Swing	▼0.84	

=== 1993 Assembly election ===
1993 Tripura Legislative Assembly election: Raima Valley
Party	Candidate	Votes	%	±%
CPI(M)	Ananda Mohan Roaja	13,426	54.22%	▲5.22
TUS	Rabindra Debbarma	11,134	44.97%	▼6.03
Margin of victory		2,292	9.26%	▲7.27
Turnout		24,760	80.50%	▼1.53
Registered electors		31,202		▲20.96
CPI(M) gain from TUS		Swing		

=== 1988 Assembly election ===
1988 Tripura Legislative Assembly election: Raima Valley
Party	Candidate	Votes	%	±%
TUS	Rabindra Debbarma	10,640	50.99%	▼0.83
CPI(M)	Ram Kumar Debbarma	10,225	49.01%	▲0.83
Margin of victory		415	1.99%	▼1.66
Turnout		20,865	82.29%	▲10.67
Registered electors		25,795		▲20.77
TUS hold		Swing		

=== 1983 Assembly election ===
1983 Tripura Legislative Assembly election: Raima Valley
Party	Candidate	Votes	%	±%
TUS	Rabindra Debbarma	7,772	51.82%	▲36.76
CPI(M)	Anand Mohan Reaja	7,225	48.18%	▼24.47
Margin of victory		547	3.65%	▼53.94
Turnout		14,997	71.66%	▲4.66
Registered electors		21,358		▲32.78
TUS gain from CPI(M)		Swing		

=== 1977 Assembly election ===
1977 Tripura Legislative Assembly election: Raima Valley
Party	Candidate	Votes	%	±%
CPI(M)	Baju Ban Riyan	7,661	72.65%	New
TUS	Monojay Roaja	1,588	15.06%	New
INC	Dinesh Chandra Debbarma	890	8.44%	New
TPCC	Panji Ham Reang	212	2.01%	New
JP	Chandra Kumar Reang	194	1.84%	New
Margin of victory		6,073	57.59%	
Turnout		10,545	67.65%	
Registered electors		16,085		
CPI(M) win (new seat)				

== See also ==
- List of constituencies of the Tripura Legislative Assembly
- Dhalai district
