= Brishaketu Debbarma =

Indian politician (born 1977)

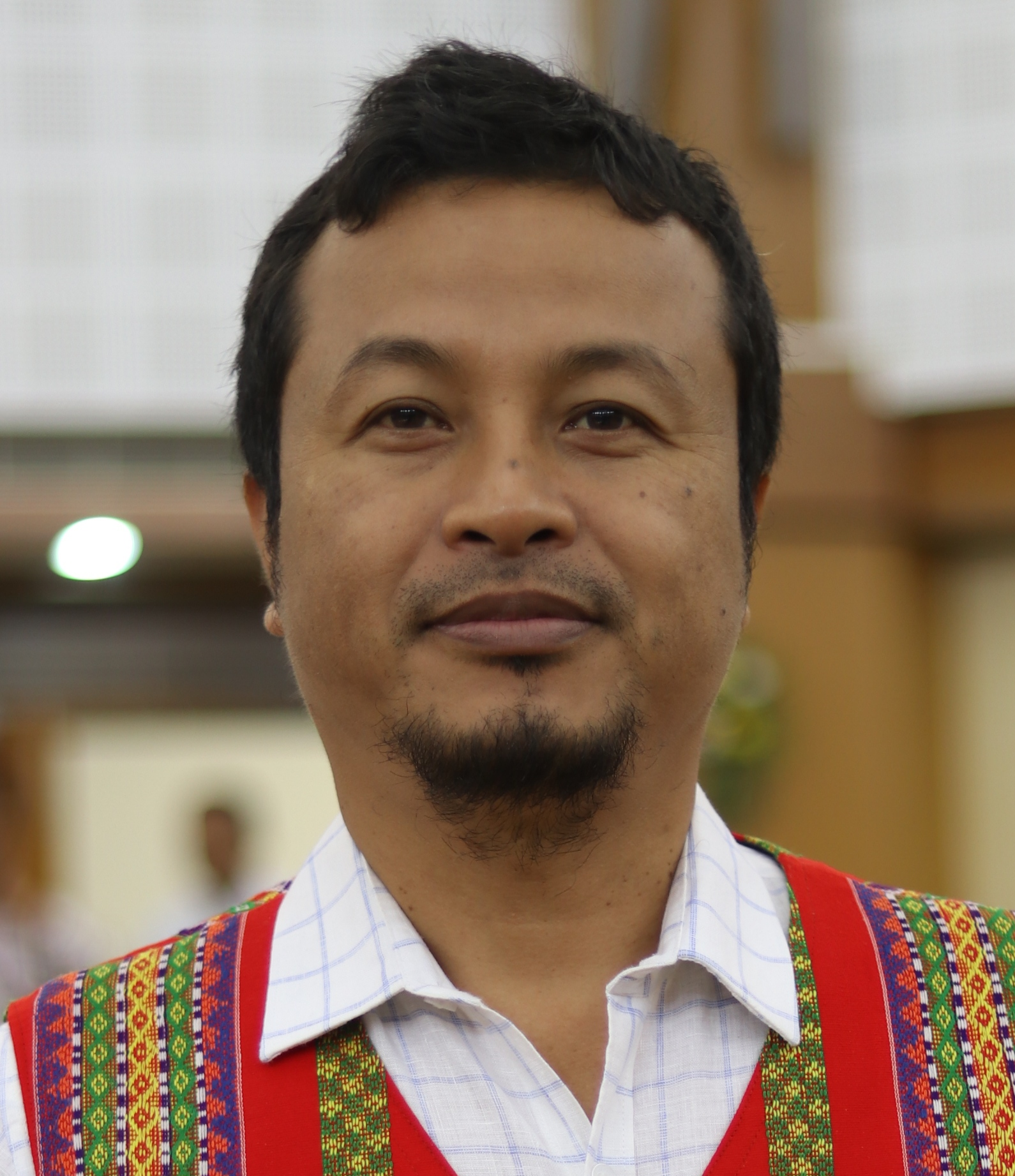
- Brishaketu Debbarma in 2023

Minister of State, Government of Tripura
- Incumbent
- Assumed office March 7, 2024
- Departments: Industries and Commerce

Member of the Tripura Legislative Assembly
- Incumbent
- Assumed office 2018
- Preceded by: Pranab Debbarma
- Constituency: Simna

Personal details
- Born: 17 May 1977 (age 49) Simna, West Tripura
- Party: TIPRA (2021–Present)
- Other political affiliations: IPFT (2017–2021)
- Children: 1
- Education: B.A., LL.B
- Alma mater: Tripura Government Law College, Maharaja Bir Bikram University
- Occupation: Politician
- Profession: Advocate
- Committees: •Chairman, Public Accounts Committee, Tripura Legislative Assembly (2023–2024) •Chairman, House Committee, Tripura Legislative Assembly (2021–2022)

Brishaketu Debbarma (born May 17, 1977) is a politician from Tripura, India. He was a member of 12th Tripura Legislative Assembly. He was elected to the Assembly in 2018, representing the Simna constituency) as a member of the Indigenous People's Front of Tripura. He resigned from the Legislative Assembly on 29 June 2021 and joined the Tipraha Indigenous Progressive Regional Alliance (TIPRA) on 9 July 2021.

== Early life and career ==
Debbarma was born in Simna, West Tripura on 1 January 1977 to a Tripuri family. He attended the local government school till his matriculation and later attended a school in Agartala for his higher secondary studies. He studied at The Tripura Government Law College which was under Tripura University then and holds a B.A. LL.B or Law Degree.

After completing his B.A. LLB Degree, Brishaketu Debbarma briefly worked as an advocate in and around Agartala. He along with fellow advocates actively engaged in filing petitions in Tripura High Court on several issues like malaria deaths in Tripura and others related to public well-being.

== Political career ==
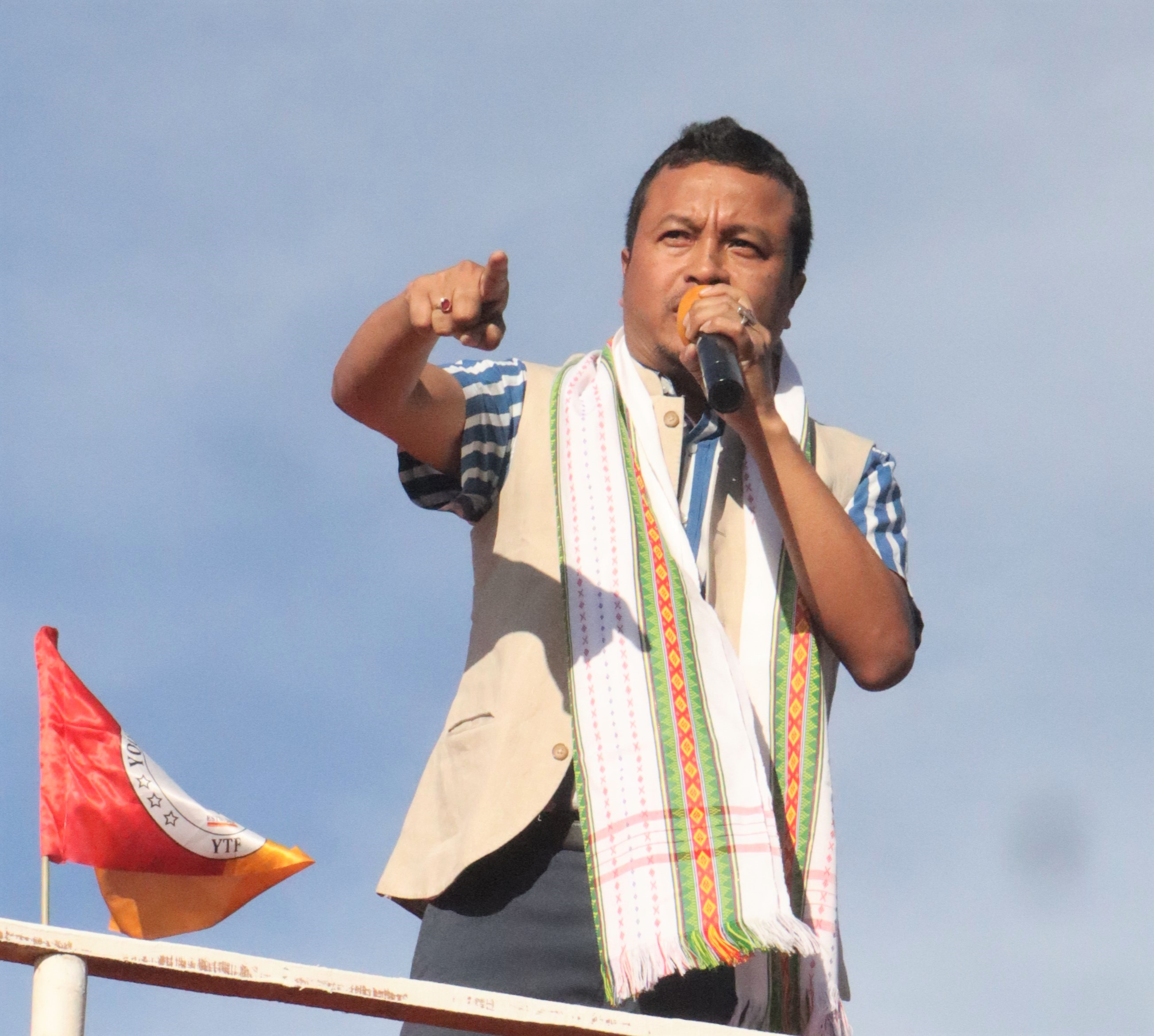
Brishaketu Debbarma speaking at a political event in 2022

=== Minister of State ===
Brishaketu Debbarma was sworn in as Minister of State on March 7, 2024.

=== Tripura State Legislature ===
In 2018, Brishaketu was picked by the Indigenous People's Front of Tripura as its candidate from the 1 Simna Assembly Constituency. He defeated the five-time CPI (M) MLA Pranab Debbarma by 1,963 votes, securing 48.37% of the total votes.

In 2018, Brishaketu was picked by the Indigenous People's Front of Tripura as its candidate from the 1 Simna Assembly Constituency. He defeated the five-time CPI (M) MLA Pranab Debbarma by 1,963 votes, securing 48.37% of the total votes.

After being a legislator for four years of the IPFT-BJP coalition government, Brishaketu resigned in 2021 citing personal reasons. He then joined the TIPRA Motha in 2021 and is known to be close to its chairman Pradyot Manikya.

== Political positions ==
According to political commentators, Brishaketu is perceived as a nationalist and social activist who approaches issues from a perspective of advocacy.

=== Tipraland Demand ===
He has been an "ardent" supporter of the proposed state of Tipraland and took some key decisions in politics in line with it. In 2021, Brishaketu Debbarma left the IPFT due to its neglect of the statehood demand after it came to power.

=== Kokborok Language ===
According to Homchang, Brishaketu Debbarma has been an active advocate for the use of the Kokborok language in Tripura Legislative Assembly sessions and proceedings.
