= Debajit Tripura =

Tripura politician

Member Tripura Tribal Areas Autonomous District Council
- Incumbent
- Assumed office 2021
- Constituency: Purba Muhuripur Bhuratali constituency

Personal details
- Citizenship: India
- Party: The Indigenous Progressive Regional Alliance

Debajit Tripura is an Indian politician and elected member of the Tripura Tribal Areas Autonomous District Council (TTAADC). He was elected from the Purba Muhuripur Bhuratali constituency.

Debajit Tripura is the zonal chairman of Tripura Tribal Areas Autonomous District Council from south zone.
