= Dhananjoy Tripura =

Indian politician and social activist

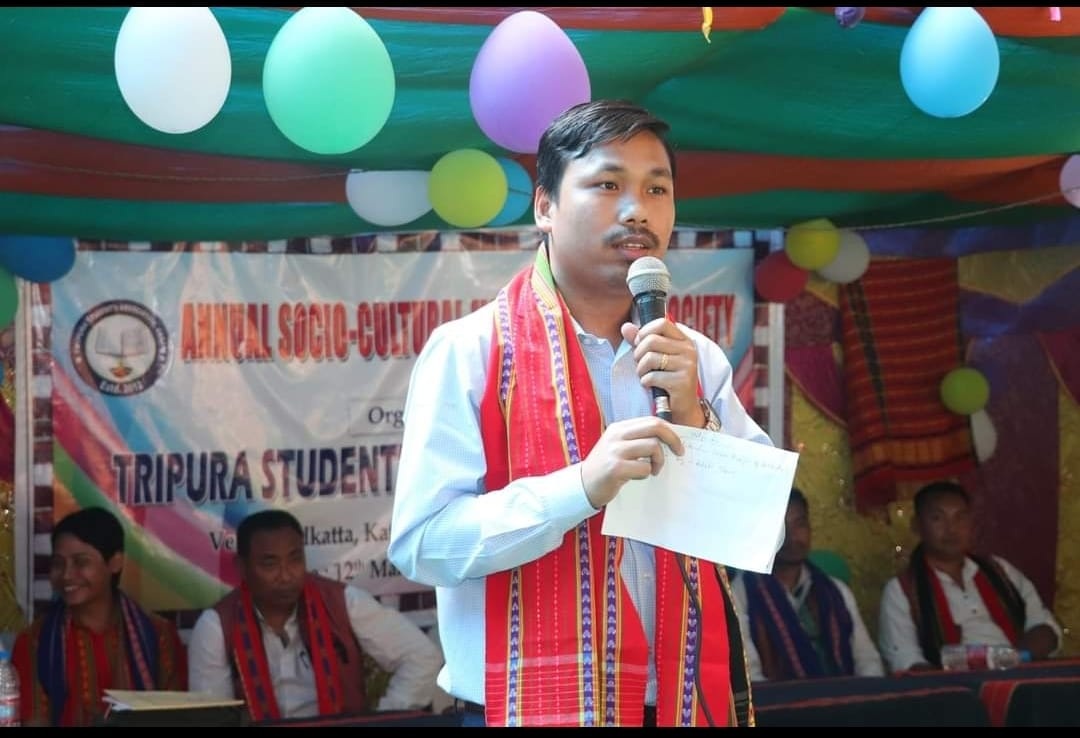

Member of the Tripura Tribal Areas Autonomous District Council
- Incumbent
- Assumed office 2026
- Constituency: 24 Raima Valley (ST)

Member of the Tripura Legislative Assembly
- In office 9 March 2018 – 2023
- Constituency: Raima Valley

Personal details
- Born: Dhananjoy Tripura Tripura, India
- Party: Tipra Motha Party
- Other political affiliations: Indigenous Peoples Front of Tripura (former)
- Education: Assam University

Dhananjoy Tripura is an Indian politician and social activist from the state of Tripura. He served as a member of the Tripura Legislative Assembly representing the Raima Valley constituency from 2018 to 2023. In 2026, he was elected as a Member of District Council (MDC) in the Tripura Tribal Areas Autonomous District Council (TTAADC).

He was elected to the Tripura Legislative Assembly in the 2018 Tripura Legislative Assembly election as a candidate of the Indigenous Peoples Front of Tripura (IPFT).

In 2022, he left the IPFT and joined the Tipra Motha Party.

In the 2026 TTAADC election, he was elected as MDC from his constituency as a candidate of the Tipra Motha Party.
