= Pranab Debbarma =

Indian politician (born 1962)

Member of Legislative Assembly, Tripura
- In office 1993–2018
- Preceded by: Abhiram Debbarma
- Succeeded by: Brishaketu Debbarma
- Constituency: Simna ST

Personal details
- Born: 21 December 1962 (age 63) Simna, Tripura
- Party: Communist Party of India (Marxist)
- Spouse: Smt. Manju Debbarma
- Education: Maharaja Bir Bikram College

Pranab Debbarma (born 21 December 1962) is an Indian politician and member of the Communist Party of India (Marxist). He is a former member of the Tripura Legislative Assembly, serving from 1993 to 2018 representing the Simna constituency. In the 2018 Tripura Legislative Assembly election he was defeated by the IPFT candidate Brishaketu Debbarma.

== Early life ==
Debbarma was born on 21 December 1962 in Ishanpur, Sidhai Tripura, India. He involved himself in the student movement from 1978 to 1988 under the banner of the SFI TSU. He graduated from Maharaja Bir Bikram College. After his graduation he joined the Youth Organisation to gain deeper insights into actual youth problems. In 1996, he was kidnapped by the All Tripura Tiger Force and he was taken to Bangladesh, where he spent 11 months in their confinement.

== Political career ==
He started his political career as a student activist in 1978. Later he joined the Tribal Youth Federation, a tribal youth wing of the CPI(M). In the 1993 Tripura Legislative Assembly election he became Member of Legislative Assembly from the Simna constituency, serving until 2018. He is a member of CPI(M) Tripura state committee and a member of the Central Committee of Ganamukti Parishad.

== Further link ==
- "Tripura: from militancy to peace". South Asia Views. 26 February 2017.
- "TRIPURA'S FIRST CALL CENTER ..." tripurainfo.com.
- "16 Tripura MLAs never raised a question in five years: Report". Hindustan Times. 26 January 2018.
