= Simna Assembly constituency =

Constituency of the Tripura legislative assembly in India

Coordinates: 24.1°N 91.41°E

Simna
- Constituency No. 1 for the Tripura Legislative Assembly

Constituency details
- Country: India
- Region: Northeast India
- State: Tripura
- District: West Tripura
- Lok Sabha constituency: Tripura West
- Established: 1972
- Total electors: 38,536
- Reservation: ST

Member of Legislative Assembly
- 13th Tripura Legislative Assembly
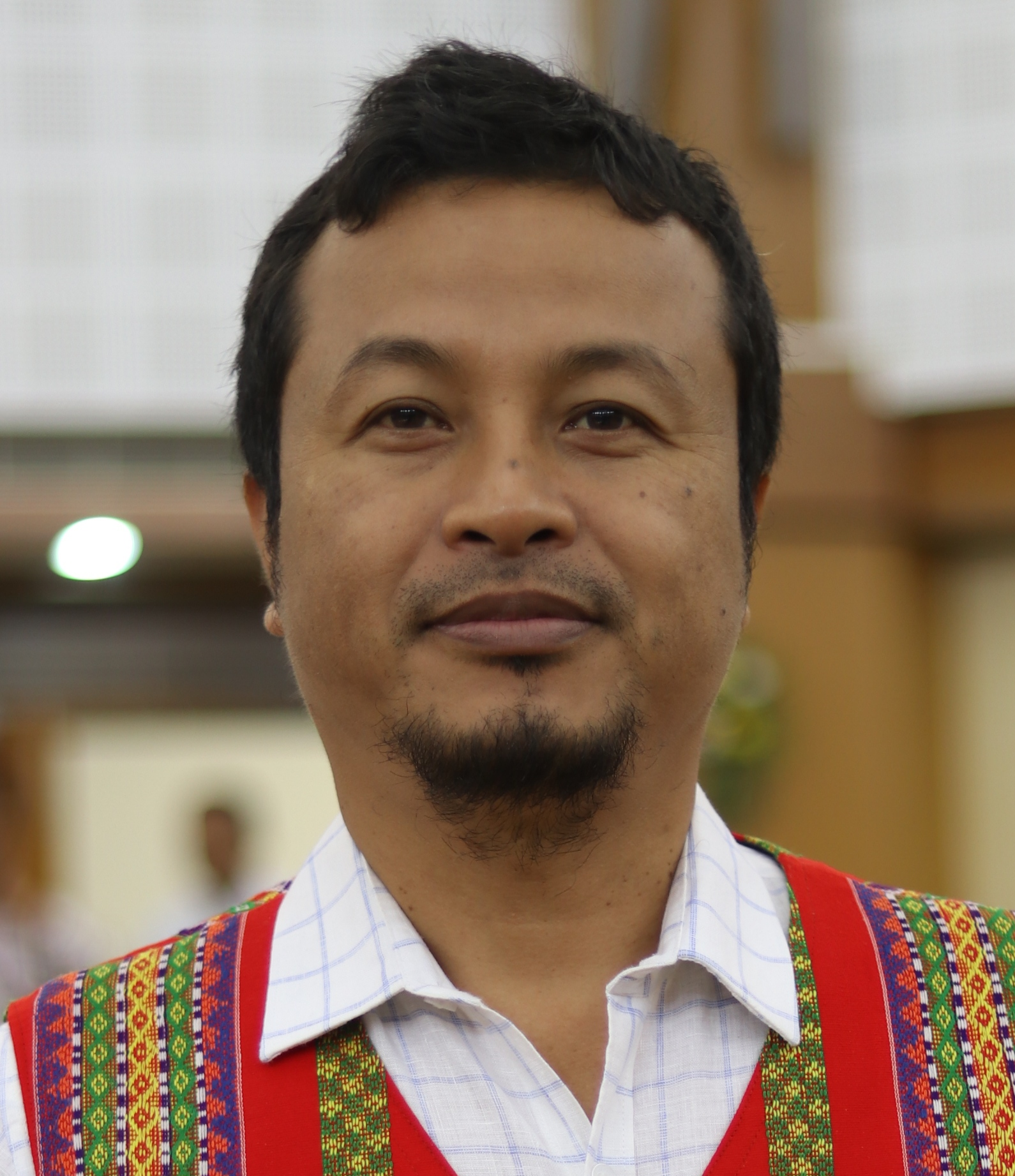
- Incumbent Brishaketu Debbarma
- Party: TMP
- Alliance: NDA
- Elected year: 2023

Simna is one of the 60 Legislative Assembly constituencies of Tripura state in India. It is in West Tripura district and is reserved for candidates belonging to the Scheduled Tribes. It is also part of the Tripura West Lok Sabha constituency.

== Members of Legislative Assembly ==
Year	Name	Party
1972	Bhadramani Debbarma	Communist Party of India (Marxist)
1977	Abhiram Debbarma	Communist Party of India (Marxist)
1983	Abhiram Debbarma	Communist Party of India (Marxist)
1988	Abhiram Debbarma	Communist Party of India (Marxist)
1993	Pranab Debbarma	Communist Party of India (Marxist)
1998	Pranab Debbarma	Communist Party of India (Marxist)
2003	Pranab Debbarma	Communist Party of India (Marxist)
2008	Pranab Debbarma	Communist Party of India (Marxist)
2013	Pranab Debbarma	Communist Party of India (Marxist)
2018	Brishaketu Debbarma	Indigenous People's Front of Tripura
2023	Brishaketu Debbarma	Tipra Motha Party

== Election results ==
=== 2023 Assembly election ===
2023 Tripura Legislative Assembly election: Simna
Party	Candidate	Votes	%	±%
TMP	Brishaketu Debbarma	22,757	64.89	New
CPI(M)	Kumodh Debbarma	5,811	16.57	▼25.66
BJP	Binod Debbarma	5,663	16.15	New
NOTA	None of the Above	422	1.20	▲0.05
Independent	Jiten Debbarma	418	1.19	New
Margin of victory		16,946	48.32%	▲42.40
Turnout		35,071	91.13%	▼1.26
Registered electors		38,536		▲7.14
TMP gain from IPFT		Swing	▲16.74	

=== 2018 Assembly election ===
2018 Tripura Legislative Assembly election: Simna
Party	Candidate	Votes	%	±%
IPFT	Brishaketu Debbarma	15,977	48.15%	▲46.13
CPI(M)	Pranab Debbarma	14,014	42.23%	▼12.13
INPT	Rabindra Debbarma	1,628	4.91%	▼37.29
INC	Phani Lal Debbarma	495	1.49%	New
Tripura Peoples Party	Ananta Urang	388	1.17%	New
NOTA	None of the Above	382	1.15%	New
Margin of victory		1,963	5.92%	▼6.25
Turnout		33,185	91.92%	▼1.17
Registered electors		35,967		▲7.07
IPFT gain from CPI(M)		Swing	▼6.21	

=== 2013 Assembly election ===
2013 Tripura Legislative Assembly election: Simna
Party	Candidate	Votes	%	±%
CPI(M)	Pranab Debbarma	17,063	54.36%	▼0.50
INPT	Rabindra Debbarma	13,244	42.19%	▼0.01
IPFT	Subodh Debbarma	632	2.01%	New
BJP	Hiramuni Debbarma	450	1.43%	New
Margin of victory		3,819	12.17%	▼0.49
Turnout		31,389	93.65%	▲0.75
Registered electors		33,593		
CPI(M) hold		Swing	▼0.50	

=== 2008 Assembly election ===
2008 Tripura Legislative Assembly election: Simna
Party	Candidate	Votes	%	±%
CPI(M)	Pranab Debbarma	14,439	54.86%	▲3.54
INPT	Rabindra Debbarma	11,108	42.20%	▼4.22
Independent	Rabindra Kishore Debbarma	517	1.96%	New
AITC	Rita Rani Debbarma	257	0.98%	New
Margin of victory		3,331	12.66%	▲7.76
Turnout		26,321	92.82%	▲18.81
Registered electors		28,397		
CPI(M) hold		Swing	▲3.54	

=== 2003 Assembly election ===
2003 Tripura Legislative Assembly election: Simna
Party	Candidate	Votes	%	±%
CPI(M)	Pranab Debbarma	10,686	51.32%	▼1.55
INPT	Rabindra Debbarma	9,666	46.42%	New
LJP	Rabindra Debbarma	472	2.27%	New
Margin of victory		1,020	4.90%	▼3.53
Turnout		20,824	73.91%	▲1.07
Registered electors		28,185		▲12.52
CPI(M) hold		Swing		

=== 1998 Assembly election ===
1998 Tripura Legislative Assembly election: Simna
Party	Candidate	Votes	%	±%
CPI(M)	Pranab Debbarma	9,641	52.86%	▼10.70
TUS	Rabindra Debbarma	8,104	44.43%	▲11.63
BJP	Daballa Debbarma	408	2.24%	▲1.56
Margin of victory		1,537	8.43%	▼22.33
Turnout		18,238	75.10%	▼7.17
Registered electors		25,049		▲4.76
CPI(M) hold		Swing		

=== 1993 Assembly election ===
1993 Tripura Legislative Assembly election: Simna
Party	Candidate	Votes	%	±%
CPI(M)	Pranab Debbarma	12,156	63.56%	▲2.89
TUS	Rabindra Debbarma	6,274	32.81%	▼6.03
Independent	Sukram Debbarma	523	2.73%	New
BJP	Biney Debbarma	129	0.67%	New
Margin of victory		5,882	30.76%	▲8.92
Turnout		19,124	81.26%	▼4.80
Registered electors		23,910		▲19.19
CPI(M) hold		Swing	▲2.89	

=== 1988 Assembly election ===
1988 Tripura Legislative Assembly election: Simna
Party	Candidate	Votes	%	±%
CPI(M)	Abhiram Debbarma	10,318	60.67%	▼4.56
TUS	Rabindra Debbarma	6,605	38.84%	▲4.63
Margin of victory		3,713	21.83%	▼9.19
Turnout		17,007	86.04%	▲2.70
Registered electors		20,060		▲16.66
CPI(M) hold		Swing		

=== 1983 Assembly election ===
1983 Tripura Legislative Assembly election: Simna
Party	Candidate	Votes	%	±%
CPI(M)	Abhiram Debbarma	9,206	65.23%	▲11.09
TUS	Kripa Rani Debbarma	4,828	34.21%	▲25.38
Independent	Pabitra Mohan Laskar	80	0.57%	New
Margin of victory		4,378	31.02%	▼1.31
Turnout		14,114	83.41%	▼0.01
Registered electors		17,195		▲12.36
CPI(M) hold		Swing		

=== 1977 Assembly election ===
1977 Tripura Legislative Assembly election: Simna
Party	Candidate	Votes	%	±%
CPI(M)	Abhiram Debbarma	6,800	54.13%	▲1.11
JP	Maharajkumar Sahadev Bikram Kishore Dev Barman	2,739	21.80%	New
TPCC	Mahendra Debbarma	1,493	11.89%	New
TUS	Subodh Debbarma	1,109	8.83%	New
INC	Brishaketu Debbarma	421	3.35%	▼38.85
Margin of victory		4,061	32.33%	▲21.50
Turnout		12,562	83.98%	▲8.04
Registered electors		15,303		▲30.78
CPI(M) hold		Swing	▲1.11	

=== 1972 Assembly election ===
1972 Tripura Legislative Assembly election: Simna
Party	Candidate	Votes	%	±%
CPI(M)	Bhadramani Debbarma	4,594	53.02%	New
INC	S. B. Kishore Debbarman	3,656	42.20%	New
CPI	Bimal Chandra Debbarma	414	4.78%	New
Margin of victory		938	10.83%	
Turnout		8,664	75.04%	
Registered electors		11,701		
CPI(M) win (new seat)				

== See also ==
- List of constituencies of the Tripura Legislative Assembly
- Tripura Legislative Assembly
- Mandaibazar (Vidhan Sabha constituency)
