= Purna Chandra Jamatia =

Tripura politician

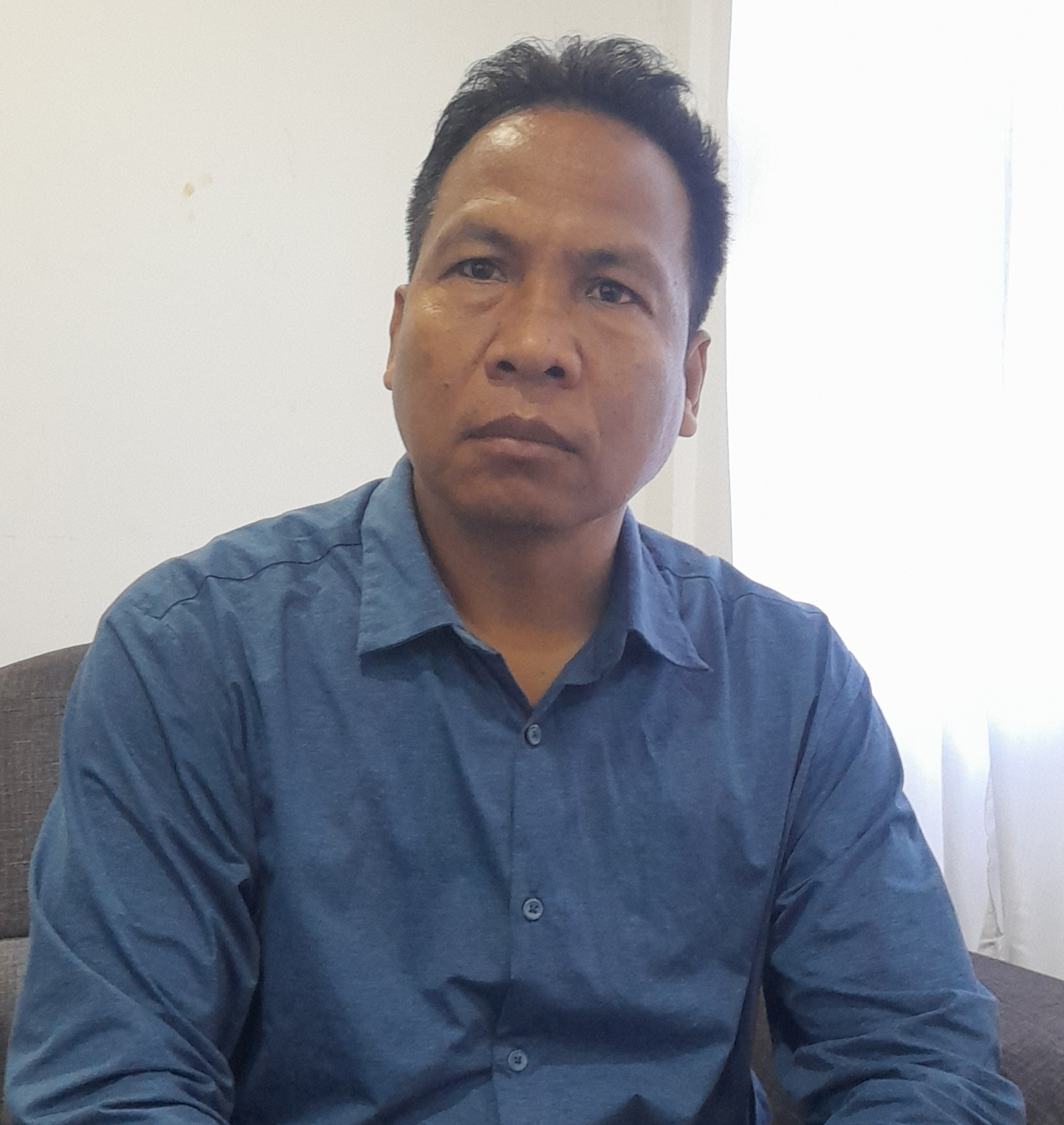
- Jamatia official portrait

Chief Executive Member of Tripura Tribal Areas Autonomous District Council
- In office 20 April 2021 – 5 May 2026
- Preceded by: Radhacharan Debbarma
- Succeeded by: Runiel Debbarma

Member of District Council Tripura Tribal Areas Autonomous District Council
- Incumbent
- Assumed office 19 April 2021
- Preceded by: Joy Kishore Jamatia
- Constituency: Killa-Bagma

Personal details
- Born: 7 November 1977 (age 48)
- Party: TIPRA Motha Party
- Children: 2
- Education: B.A. (Political Science), Maharaja Bir Bikram University

Purna Chandra Jamatia (born 7 November 1977), is an Indian social political activist and elected former Chief Executive Member of the Tripura Tribal Areas Autonomous District Council (TTAADC) for the first time and he is also the Member of District Council since 2021 (TTAADC). Purna Chandra Jamatia was elected from the Killa Bagma Assembly constituency.

== Early life and education ==
Jamatia was born on 7 November 1977 in Killa, Tripura. His father is Ananda Pada Jamatia and mother Radha Kumari Jamatia. Being the eldest son, he has three sisters and two brother.

Jamatia attended the Kirit Bikram School until the year 2000. From 2000 to 2004, Jamatia attended Bir Bikram Memorial College in Agartala. He completed his B.A. in political science.

== Political career ==
Jamatia after attaining a degree in political science had spent a significant amount of time working with the Nationalist and Regional Political Party, the Indigenous Nationalist Party of Twipra (INPT), its Youth wing organisation President of IYFT i.e. The Indigenous Youth Federation of Twipra before joining the Tipra Motha Party.

Jamatia contested the 2010 Tripura Tribal Areas Autonomous District Council election with a ticket from INPT but lose to CPIM candidate Joy Kishore Jamatia.

Later in 2018, Jamatia joined Congress and eventually to Tipra Motha Party with the emerging leadership of Pradyot Bikram Manikya Deb Barma.

== Positions held ==
2003-2006: Twipra Students' Federation (TSF) College Committee Member.

2004-2006: Udaipur Divisional TSF Secreatary.

2006-2013: Divisional secretary of INPT.

2016-2018: State Youth President of INPT.

2018 bisini paithago bubagra bai yak romkha, congress than TIPRA

20.04.2021: Elected 14th CEM

== Chief Executive Member ==
In May 2021, Jamatia was announced as the Chief Executive Member of Tripura Tribal Areas Autonomous District Council. This announcement came following the landslide victory by Tipra Motha Party in 2021.

== Activities ==
The Greater Tipraland resolution was passed on June 26, 2021 at the TTAADC Council after Tipra Motha Party came to power.

In August 2021, a delegation led by Tripura Royal Head Pradyot Manikya and CEM of TTAADC, Purna Chandra Jamatia meet Brazilian Ambassadors

The TTAADC government on November 8, 2024 signed an Memorandum of Understanding (MoU) with TATA Group to establish Skill Training Institute at Khumulwng.
