= Tipra Motha Party =

Indian political party

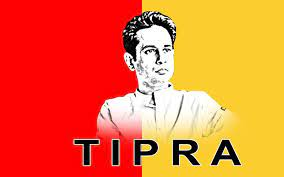
- Abbreviation: TIPRA / TMP
- Leader: Pradyot Bikram Manikya Deb Barma
- President: Bijoy Kumar Hrangkhawl
- General Secretary: Brishaketu Debbarma
- Presidium: Central Working Committee
- Treasurer: Dr. Sunil Kalai
- Founder: Pradyot Bikram Manikya Deb Barma
- Founded: 2019
- Headquarters: Manikya Dynasty Heritage Residential House, Ujjayanta Palace, Palace Compound, Agartala, Tripura; 799001
- Student wing: Tipra Indigenous Student's Federation (TISF)
- Youth wing: Youth Tipra Federation (YTF)
- Women's wing: Tipra Women Federation (TWF)
- Ideology: Tripuri nationalism
- Colours: Red and Yellow
- ECI status: State Party (Tripura)
- Alliance: NDA (2024-Present); NEDA (2024-Present)
- Seats in Tripura Legislative Assembly: 13 / 60
- Seats in Tripura Tribal Areas Autonomous District Council: 24 / 30

Election symbol
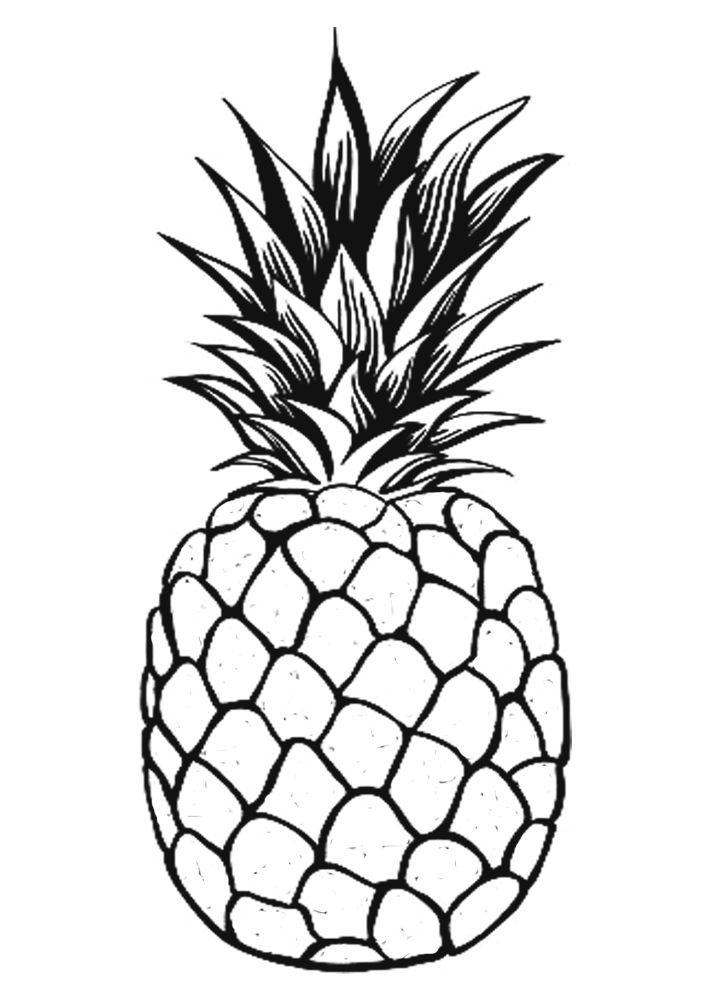
- Pineapple

Party flag
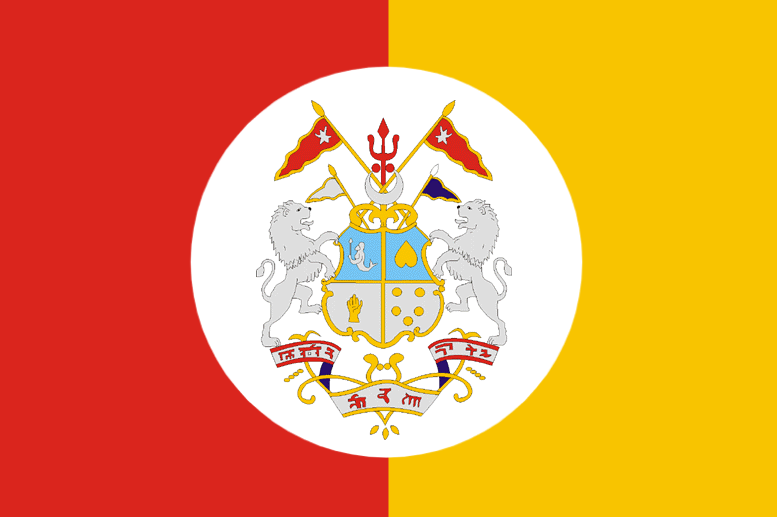

The Tipra Motha Party (TMP), also known as the Tipraha Indigenous Progressive Regional Alliance, is a regional political party and previously a social organisation in Tripura, India. The TIPRA is led by Pradyot Bikram Manikya Deb Barma. It is currently the second largest party in Tripura Legislative Assembly.

== History ==
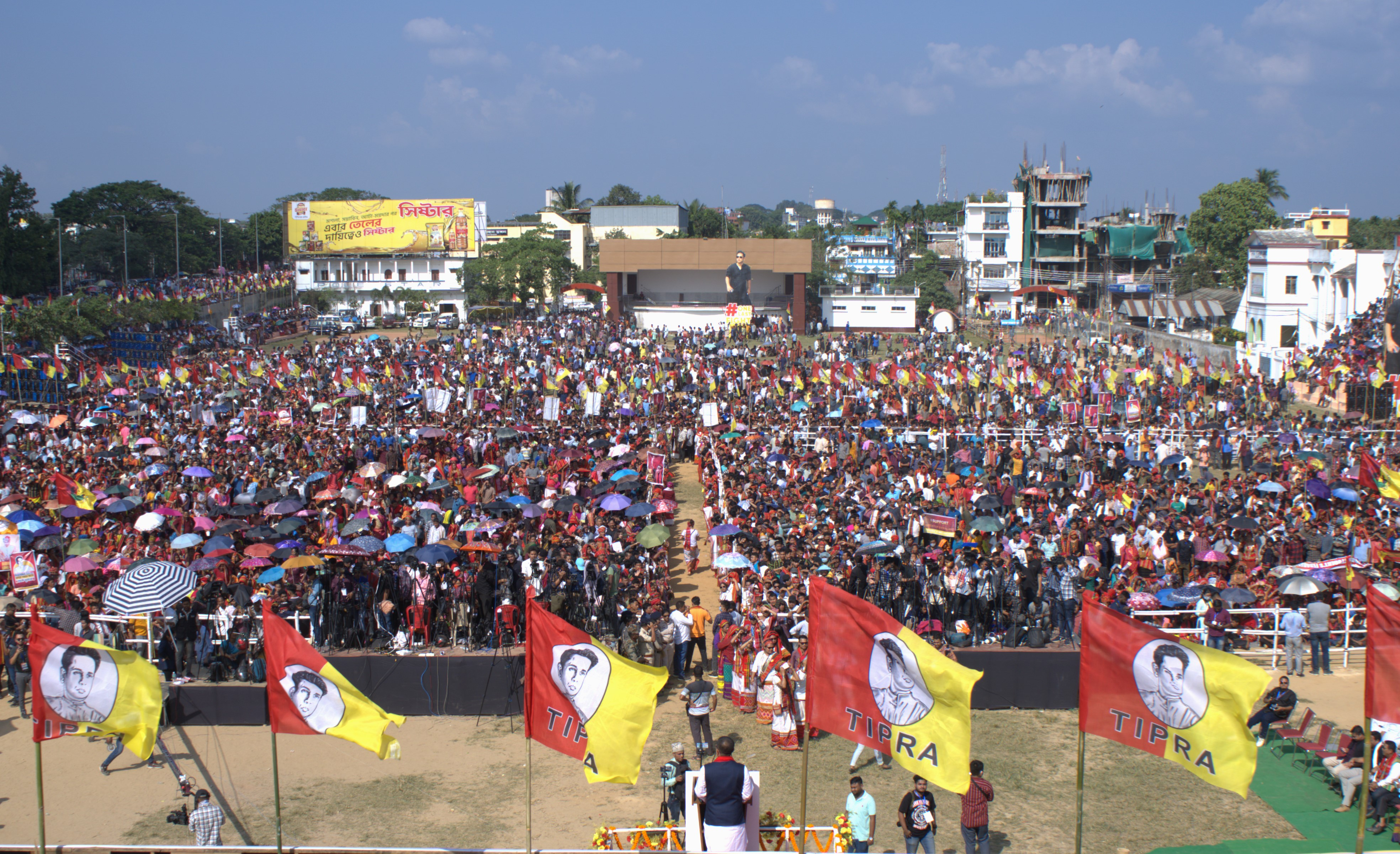
Tipra Motha Party flags at a rally in Agartala in 2022.

On 25 Feb 2019, Pradyot Bikram Manikya Deb Barma was appointed the President of Tripura Pradesh Congress Committee. Within a few months, Deb Barma resigned from the Pradesh Congress President post, accusing the Congress high command of pressuring him to accommodate 'corrupt people'. Almost three months later, he formed a social organisation to work for the rights of the indigenous people.

On 5 February 2021, Deb Barma announced that his organisation had become a political party and would contest the 2021 Tripura Tribal Areas Autonomous District Council election.

The Indigenous Nationalist Party of Twipra (INPT), Tipraland State Party (TSP) and IPFT (Tipraha) merged with the TIPRA in 2021.

In the 2023 Tripura Legislative Assembly Election, TIPRA Motha fielded over 42 candidates in different constituencies. The party won 13 seats and became the first regional party in Tripura to become the main opposition.

In March 2024, Tipra Motha joined Manik Saha-led Tripura government and Animesh Debbarma and Brishaketu Debbarma were sworn in as minister and Minister of State.

== Ideological positions ==
TIPRA's main objective is the creation of a new state called 'Greater Tipraland' under Articles 2 & 3 of the Constitution of India. The Motha emphasises Tipra nationalism, using the slogans "Puila Jati, Ulobo Jati" and "Puila Jati, Ulo Party" (Community first, party later). It aims to first empower and emancipate the Tiprasa people before anything else. The party sees its activities as a peoples' movement rather than a political one.

In 2023, Union Home Minister Amit Shah accused Tipra Motha of being allied with Congress and the CPI (M). This was denied by Deb Barma, who claimed he could not be a communist ally due to his royal ancestry, being the son of the last King of Tripura.

== Members of Parliament ==
Year	Map	Lok Sabha	Portrait	Member of Parliament	Constituency	Margin
2024		18th Lok Sabha		Kriti Singh Debbarma	Tripura East Lok Sabha constituency	

== List of Ministers ==
Cabinet Minister

Sr.no.	Portrait	Minister	Ministry	Duration	Ministry	Constituency
1.		Animesh Debbarma	Forests; General Administration (Printing & Stationery); Science, Technology, and Environment	7 March 2024- Incumbent	Second Saha ministry	Asharambari

Minister of State(MoS)

Sr.no.	Portrait	Minister	Ministry	Duration	Ministry	Constituency
1.		Brishaketu Debbarma	Industries and Commerce	7 March 2024- Incumbent	Second Saha ministry	Simna

== Elected Representatives ==
List of Chief Executive Member (CEM)

Year	Assembly		Portrait	Leader of Opposition	Duration	Constituency
2021	2021 Tripura Tribal Areas Autonomous District Council election	1.		Purna Chandra Jamatia	20 May 2021 – 17 April 2026	Killa-Bagma
2026	2026 Tripura Tribal Areas Autonomous District Council election	2.		Runiel Debbarma	5 May 2026 – present	Bodhjungnagar-Wakkinagar

List of Leader of Opposition

Year	Assembly		Portrait	Leader of Opposition	Duration	Constituency
2023	13th Tripura Assembly	1.		Animesh Debbarma	24 March 2023 – 7 March 2024	Asharambari

List of Members of Legislative Assembly

Year	Assembly		Portrait	MLA	Constituency
2023	13th Tripura Assembly	1.		Animesh Debbarma	Asharambari
2023	13th Tripura Assembly	2.		Brishaketu Debbarma	Simna
2023	13th Tripura Assembly	3.		Swapna Debbarma	Mandaibazar
2023	13th Tripura Assembly	4.		Biswajit Kalai	Takarjala Assembly
2023	13th Tripura Assembly	5.		Ranjit Debbarma	Ramchandraghat
2023	13th Tripura Assembly	6.		Philip Kumar Reang	Kanchanpur
2023	13th Tripura Assembly	7.		Manav Debbarma	Golaghati
2023	13th Tripura Assembly	8.		Subodh Deb Barma	Charilam
2023	13th Tripura Assembly	9.		Pathan Lal Jamatia	Ampinagar
2023	13th Tripura Assembly	10.		Sanjoy Manik Tripura	Karbook
2023	13th Tripura Assembly	11.		Nandita Debbarma (Reang)	Raima Valley
2023	13th Tripura Assembly	12.		Chitta Ranjan Debbarma	Ambassa
2023	13th Tripura Assembly	13.		Paul Dangshu	Karamcherra

== Electoral history ==
In 2021, the Tipra Motha Party secured a majority in the 28-member Tripura Tribal Areas Autonomous District Council elections along with its ally the Indigenous Nationalist Party of Twipra (INPT). TIPRA won 16 seats while the INPT won two seats.

The result not only ended the Left Front’s 15-year rule of the council but also became the only regional party to come into power in the council without an alliance with a national party.

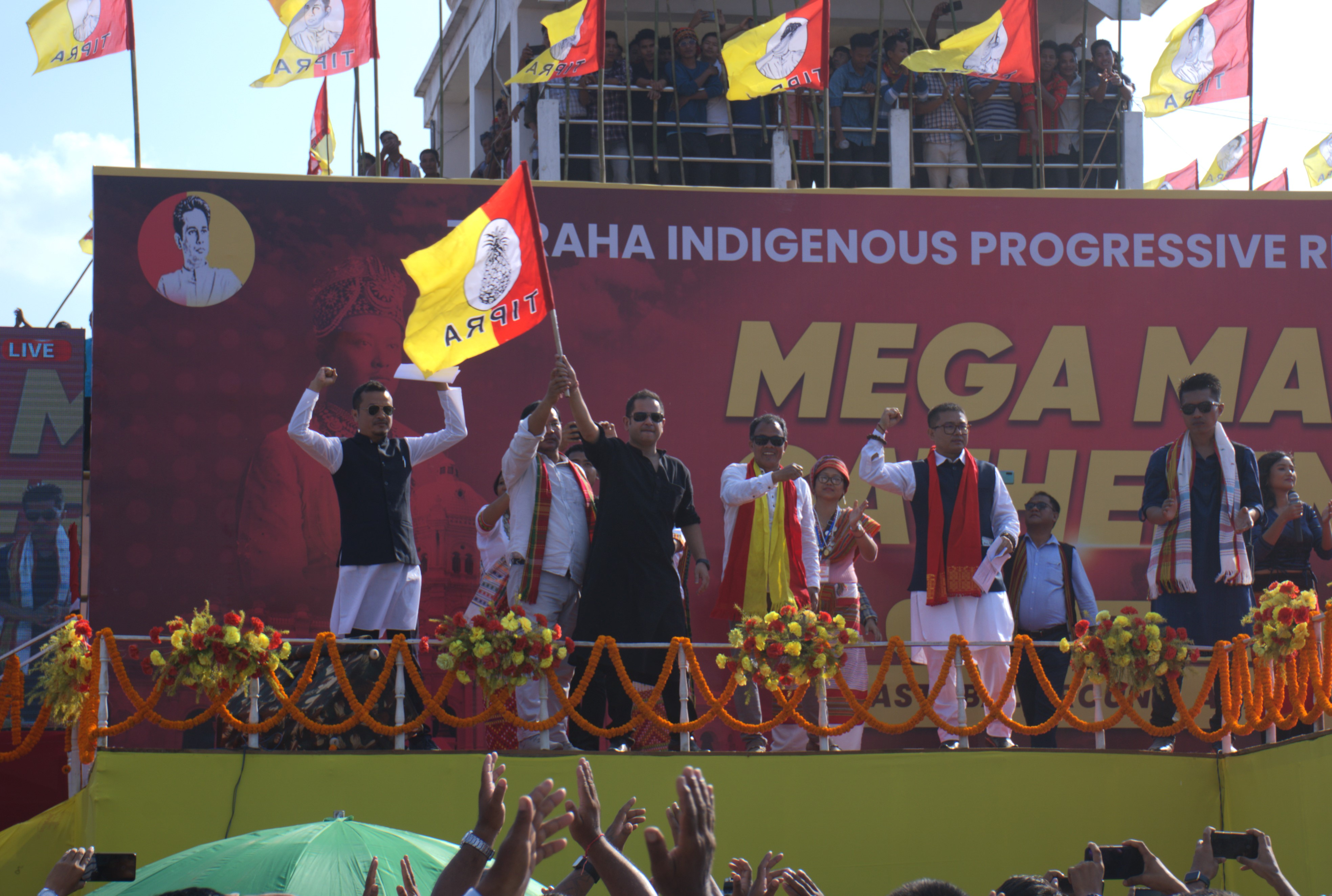
Deb Barma and other party leaders addressing the crowd at a rally in 2022.

Deb Barma reaffirmed his earlier claim that the demand for Greater Tipraland would not be compromised at any cost and issued a stern call for victory in 2023. A massive gathering of thousands of indigenous people who travelled from all over the state to the Swami Vivekananda Stadium (Astabal Ground) complemented the term "Thansa." "Bubagra is not looking to argue. We abhor all forms of violence. We never oppose any group or faith. Our movement is to demand the rights that the Indian Constitution grants us, and we will succeed in our objectives, he continued.

=== Legislative Assembly elections ===
Election Year	Overall votes	% of overall votes	seats contested	seats won	+/- in seats	+/- in vote share	Sitting side
Tripura Legislative Assembly
2023	498,182	19.69	42	13	-	-	Opposition Later Government

In 2026 TTAADC General Election, Tipra Motha Party secured a landslide victory winning 24 out of the total 28 seats. It defeated BJP and retained its rule in the Tripura Tribal Autonomous Areas District Council for the second time which no other regional parties of Tripura have done before.

=== Tripura Tribal Areas Autonomous District Council (TTAADC) ===
Election Year	Overall votes	% of overall votes	seats contested	seats won	+/- in seats	+/- in vote share	Sitting side
Tripura Tribal Areas Autonomous District Council
2021	2,74,565	37.43%	23	16	-	-	Government
2026	4,57,943	57.62%	28	24	▲8	▲20.19	Government

== Key Leaders ==
Member	Portrait	Current/ Previous Position	Party Position
Pradyot Bikram Manikya Deb Barma		Titular King of Tripura (2006–Present); MDC - Jampuijala-Takarjala (2021–2026); Chairman of Administrative Reforms Committee, TTAADC (2021–present); Former President of Tripura Pradesh Congress Committee	Chairperson
Bijoy Kumar Hrangkhawl		Member of Administrative Reforms Committee, TTAADC (2021–Present); MLA - Kulai, Tripura (1998 - 2013); Former President of INPT	National President, Central Working Committee Member
Brishaketu Debbarma		Minister of State (MoS) for Industries and Commerce, Tripura Government (7 March 2024 – present); Deputy Leader of Opposition - Tripura Legislative Assembly (2023 - 2024); MLA - Simna (2018–Present); Chairperson, Public Accounts Committee (2023–2024)	General Secretary (I/C), Organisation, Central Working Committee Member
Jagadish Debbarma		Member of District Council of TTAADC, (2026–present); Chairman (Speaker)-Tripura Tribal Areas Autonomous District Council (2021–2026); MLA- Mandwi Bazar, (1988–1993)	Central Working Committee Member
Bhaba Ranjan Reang		Chairman (Speaker)- Tripura Tribal Areas Autonomous District Council (2026–present); Member of District Council of TTAADC, (2021–present); Executive Member- Agriculture and Land Records & Settlement (2021–2026)	Central Working Committee Member
Rajeshwar Debbarma		Member of District Council of TTAADC, (2026–present); Member of Tripura Legislative Assembly, Takarjala Assembly constituency (2008 - 2014)	National Political Secretary and Spokesperson, Central Working Committee Member
Animesh Debbarma		Cabinet Minister of Tripura Government (7 March 2024–present); Leader of the Opposition - Tripura Legislative Assembly (2023 - 2024); Former Deputy CEM of TTAADC (2021 - 2023); Executive Member-Industries, Cooperative, Agriculture, and Tribal Welfare (2021–2023); Former MLA, Kalyanpur-Pramodenagar Assembly constituency (2003 - 2008)	Central Working Committee Member
Purna Chandra Jamatia		Chief Executive Member (CEM)- Tripura Tribal Areas Autonomous District Council (2021–2026); MDC Killa-Bagma (2021–Present)	Central Working Committee Member
Runiel Debbarma		Chief Executive Member (CEM)- Tripura Tribal Areas Autonomous District Council (TTAADC), (2026–present); Executive Member, TTAADC- Public Works and Rural Development (2023–2026)	TTAADC Legislative Leader
Mevar Kumar Jamatia		Minister of Tribal Welfare, Industries and Commerce, and Fisheries (2018–2022); MLA, Ashrambari (2018–2023)	Central Working Committee Member

== See also ==
- List of political parties in India
- Tripura Tribal Areas Autonomous District Council
