= Communist Party of India (Marxist) – Tripura =

Communist Party of India (Marxist), Tripura
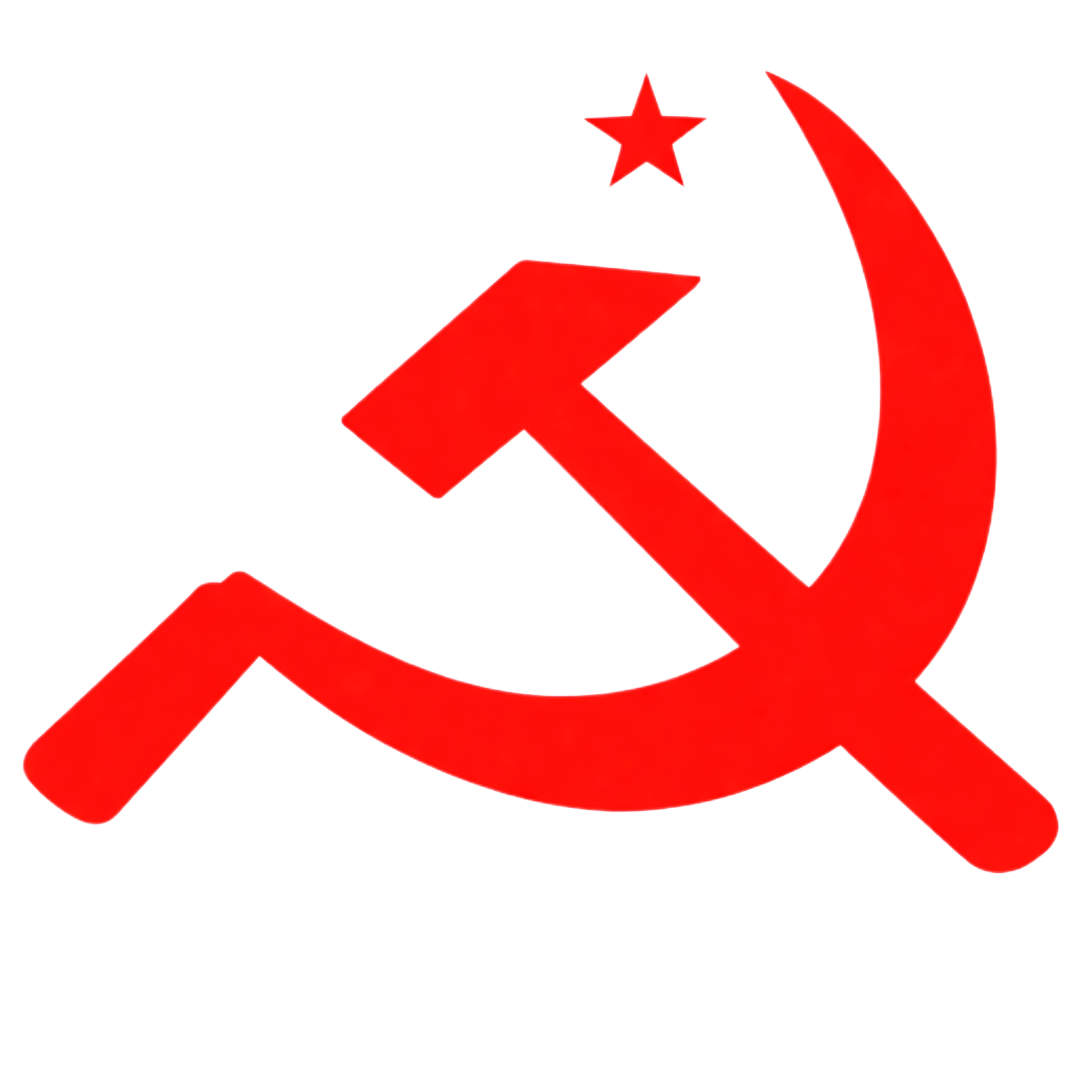
- General Secretary: Jitendra Chaudhury
- Headquarters: Melarmath, Agartala
- Newspaper: Daily Desher Katha
- Student wing: Students' Federation of India; Tribal Students’ Union
- Youth wing: Democratic Youth Federation of India; Tribal Youth Federation
- Women's wing: All India Democratic Women's Association
- Labour wing: Centre of Indian Trade Unions
- Peasant's wing: All India Kisan Sabha; All India Agricultural Workers Union
- Ideology: Communism
- Political position: Left-wing
- Alliance: Left Front (Tripura); Secular Democratic Front (SDF) (Tripura); I.N.D.I.A. (National)
- Seats in Rajya Sabha: 0 / 2
- Seats in Lok Sabha: 0 / 2
- Seats in Tripura Legislative Assembly: 10 / 60
- Seats in Tripura Tribal Areas Autonomous District Council: 0 / 30

Election symbol
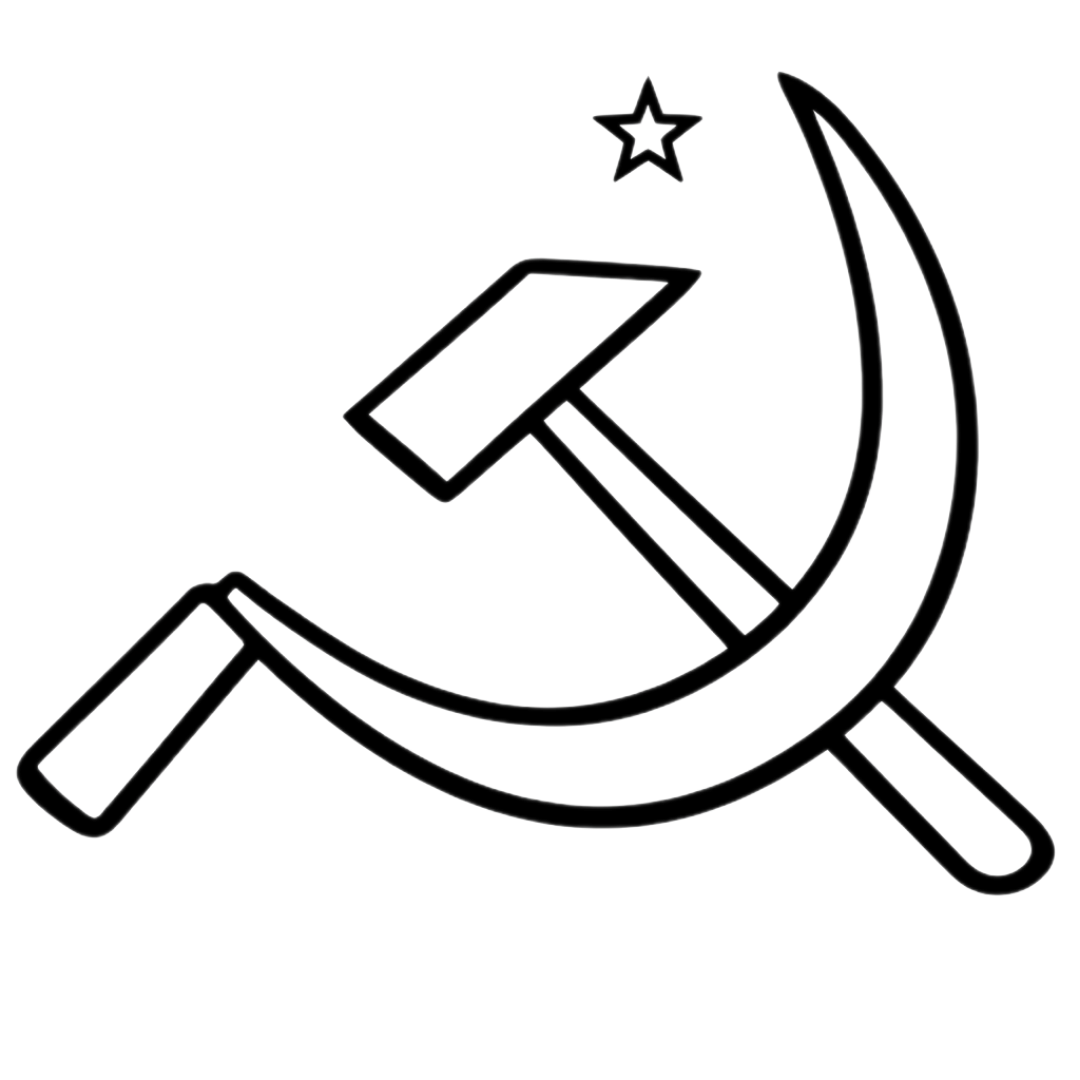

Party flag

Website
- cpim.org

The Communist Party of India (Marxist), or simply, CPI(M) Tripura; is the state unit of the Communist Party of India (Marxist) of the Tripura. Its head office is situated at Melarmath, Agartala. The current secretary of the Communist Party of India (Marxist) Tripura State Committee is Jitendra Chaudhury.

== Election results ==
=== Tripura Legislative Assembly election ===
| Year | Party leader | Seats won | Change in seats | Outcome |
|---|---|---|---|---|
| 1967 | | 2 / 30 | ▲ New | Opposition |
| 1972 | | 16 / 60 | ▲14 | Opposition |
| 1977 | Nripen Chakraborty | 51 / 60 | ▲35 | Government |
| 1983 | Nripen Chakraborty | 37 / 60 | ▼14 | Government |
| 1988 | | 26 / 60 | 11 | Opposition |
| 1993 | Dasarath Deb | 44 / 60 | ▲18 | Government |
| 1998 | Manik Sarkar | 38 / 60 | ▼6 | Government |
| 2003 | Manik Sarkar | 38 / 60 | Steady | Government |
| 2008 | Manik Sarkar | 46 / 60 | ▲8 | Government |
| 2013 | Manik Sarkar | 49 / 60 | ▲3 | Government |
| 2018 | Manik Sarkar | 16 / 60 | ▼33 | Opposition |
| 2023 | Jitendra Chaudhury | 11 / 60 | ▼5 | Opposition |

=== Lok Sabha ===
| Year | Party leader | Seats won | Change in seats | Outcome |
|---|---|---|---|---|
| 1967 | Puchalapalli Sundarayya | 0 / 2 | New | Opposition |
| 1971 | Puchalapalli Sundarayya | 2 / 2 | ▲2 | Opposition |
| 1977 | Puchalapalli Sundarayya | 0 / 2 | ▼2 | Government |
| 1980 | E. M. S. Namboodiripad | 2 / 2 | ▲2 | Opposition |
| 1984 | E. M. S. Namboodiripad | 2 / 2 | Steady | Opposition |
| 1989 | E. M. S. Namboodiripad | 0 / 2 | ▼2 | Outside support to National Front government |
| 1991 | E. M. S. Namboodiripad | 0 / 2 | Steady | Opposition |
| 1996 | Harkishan Singh Surjeet | 2 / 2 | ▲2 | Opposition, later government |
| 1998 | Harkishan Singh Surjeet | 2 / 2 | Steady | Opposition |
| 1999 | Harkishan Singh Surjeet | 2 / 2 | Steady | Opposition |
| 2004 | Harkishan Singh Surjeet | 2 / 2 | Steady | Outside support to UPA government |
| 2009 | Prakash Karat | 2 / 2 | Steady | Opposition |
| 2014 | Prakash Karat | 2 / 2 | Steady | Opposition |
| 2019 | Sitaram Yechury | 0 / 2 | ▼2 | Opposition |
| 2024 | Sitaram Yechury | 0 / 2 | Steady | Opposition |

== List of Chief ministers of Tripura from CPI(M) ==
| Name | Portrait | Term(s) | Tenure(s) |
|---|---|---|---|
| Nripen Chakraborty | | 2 | 5 January 1978 – 5 February 1988 (10 years, 31 days) |
| Dasarath Deb | | 1 | 10 April 1993 – 11 March 1998 (4 years, 335 days) |
| Manik Sarkar | A photograph of Manik Sarkar | 4 | 11 March 1998 – 9 March 2018 (19 years, 363 days) |

== State Secretary List ==
- Jithendra Chowdhary : 2021-incumbent
- Goutham Das : 2018–2021
- Bijen Dhar : 2008–2018
- Baidhyanath Manjumdhar : 1998–2008
- Manik Sarkar : 1993–1998
- Desarath Deb : 1988–1993

== List of Current Members in Tripura Legislative Assembly ==
| No. | Constituency | Name | Party | Win Margin |
|---|---|---|---|---|
| 3 | Bamutia (SC) | Nayan Sarkar | Communist Party of India (Marxist) | 2,026 |
| 4 | Barjala (SC) | Sudip Sarkar | Communist Party of India (Marxist) | 1,789 |
| 13 | Pratapgarh (SC) | Ramu Das | Communist Party of India (Marxist) | 2,086 |
| 22 | Sonamura | Shyamal Chakraborty | Communist Party of India (Marxist) | 2,415 |
| 25 | Khowai | Nirmal Biswas | Communist Party of India (Marxist) | 1,040 |
| 35 | Belonia | Dipankar Sen | Communist Party of India (Marxist) | 403 |
| 37 | Hrishyamukh | Asoke Chandra Mitra | Communist Party of India (Marxist) | 1,418 |
| 40 | Sabroom | Jitendra Chaudhury | Communist Party of India (Marxist) | 396 |
| 54 | Kadamtala-Kurti | Islam Uddin | Communist Party of India (Marxist) | 1,892 |
| 57 | Jubarajnagar | Sailendra Chandra Nath | Communist Party of India (Marxist) | 296 |

== See also ==
- Communist Party of India (Marxist), Kerala
- Communist Party of India (Marxist), West Bengal
- Communist Party of India (Marxist), Tamil Nadu
