= Protests against the death of Anish Khan =

2022 protests in India

- Date: February 18, 2022 – March 2022
- Location: West Bengal and abroad
- Caused by: Murder of Anish Khan
- Methods: Protests, sit-ins, demonstrations, clashes with police
- Status: Ongoing
- Result: Government-ordered SIT probe; arrests made
- Concessions: SIT investigation ordered by the government

Parties
Protesters students]]: Civilians and Students; ' Aliah University' General students; Student organizations; SFI; AISF; PSU; AISB; Other left student organizations; Youth organizations; DYFI; AIYF; AIYL; Other left youth organizations; Political parties; CPI(M); CPI; AIFB; RSP; Other left parties; Other support; INC; Others	Government of West Bengal: Department of Home and Hill Affairs; West Bengal Police; Kolkata Police; Supported by; Trinamool Congress; Trinamool Chhatra Parishad

Lead figures
Md Irfan Sadique; Mansur Habibulla; Sajidur Rahman; Mirajul Islam; Hasan Midya; Masudur Rahman; Nasim Nawaz; Minakshi Mukherjee; Srijan Bhattacharyya; Mohammed Salim; Others	Mamata Banerjee (Chief Minister, Home Minister); Vineet Kumar Goyal (Commissioner, KP, until 2024); Manoj Kumar Verma (Commissioner, KP, Incumbent; Manoj Malaviya (DGP, WBP until 2023); Rajeev Kumar (DGP, WBP Incumbent)

Number
Lakhs of protesters across the state	Police and security forces

Casualties
- Injuries: 200+ protesters injured in clashes
- Arrested: 350+ protesters detained

The protest against the death of Anish Khan, also known as the justice for Anish Khan protest, began on 18 February 2022 after the death of Students' Federation of India activist Anish Khan. SFI, AISF and other organizations organised protests, including rallies, human chains and demonstrations.

The protests began in Jadavpur and Park Circus, initiated by students at Aliah University, led by Md Irfan, Habibulla, Sajidur Rahman, Mirajul Islam. Irfan Sadique stated that Anish Khan had repeatedly lodged serious complaints regarding threats from local TMCP leaders and police, but no security measures were provided. Within six months, Anish Khan was killed inside his residence at night. According to reports, police did not arrest the alleged main culprits. A Special Investigation Team (SIT) later stated that Khan had died after slipping from a pipe, a conclusion that was rejected by his family members and protesters; day after day protest rapidly spread across the state of West Bengal and throughout India.

== Background ==
Anish Khan (25 July 1993 – 18 February 2022) was a student at Aliah University. At midnight on 18 February 2022, Khan was allegedly killed by four people dressed as police officers. Three police officers who influenced the case were suspended by the government of West Bengal. A special investigation team (SIT) named Debabrata Chakraborty, Sourav Kanrar, Pritam Bhattacharjee, Nirmal Das and Kashinath Bera as conspirators and killers in its charge sheet.

== Protests ==
- On 18 February, Aliah University students of held a rally in Park Circus. Two policemen and one student were seriously injured. And then protest spread across the State.
- On 21 February, Students Against Fascism, the SFI and AISA organised a rally in Kolkata from Esplanade to M.G. Road.
- On 22 February, SFI and AISA called a bandh at Jadavpur University demanding justice for Anish Khan. Two SFI members and one AISA activist were injured.
- On 22 February, Aliah University students organised a rally at Mahakaran Avijan. A number of students were seriously injured in a lathi charge by the Kolkata Police, and 49 students (including two AISA activists) were arrested.
- On 22 February, the Howrah district committee of the CPIML Liberation and the AISA, AIPWA, and AIARLA organised a large rally in Uluberia. CPIML Liberation, AISA and AIARLA sent delegations to the Uluberia DM's office.
- On 23 February, the CPIM West Bengal state committee organised a rally in Siliguri.
- On 26 February, the party's West Bengal state committee organised a rally in Panchla. Several activists and leaders, including Minakshi Mukherjee, were seriously injured in a lathi charge by West Bengal Police and civilian volunteers. Seventeen SFI and Democratic Youth Federation of India protesters were arrested by Howrah City Police. Mukherjee and fifteen other CPIM activists were arrested in the protest, and thirteen police officers were seriously injured by CPIM activists.
- On 1 March, the SFI, AISF, PSU, AISB and AISA organised a march from Sealdah to College Street in Kolkata. The DYFI, RYA, and AIYF also joined the protest.
- ISF West Bengal state committee organised a rally from Sealdah to Esplanade in Kolkata in which seven to eight thousand people participated.
- On 1 March, the AILAJ, AILU, and LSJHR organised a rally as Lawyers For Democracy from the Calcutta High Court to Esplanade. AILAJ leader Dibakar Bhattacharya and AILU leader Bikash Ranjan Bhattacharya led the rally.
- On 2 March, AIDSO West Bengal organised a rally in Lalbazar in the demands of Justice for Anish Khan. Several AIDSO activists were injured by Kolkata police.
- On 4 March, the CPIML Liberation Darjeeling district committee organised a rally in Siliguri, from Kanchenjunga Stadium to Airview Road.
- On 10 March, the SFI organised a rally from College Street to MD Ali Park in Kolkata.

== Counter-protest ==
On 28 February, 10 days after Khan's death, Trinamool Chaatra Parishad organised a rally from Moulali to Esplanade in Kolkata. Hundreds of people attended.

== International protest ==
On 4 March, the Bangladesh Students Union held a protest in Dhaka and expressed solidarity with the Indian protests.
