= Sankar Gupta =

Indian politician

- Born: 9 September 1940; Kolkata
- Died: 22 January 1983 (aged 42); Kolkata
- Education: Jadavpur University
- Occupation: Politician
- Spouse: Shyamali Gupta

MLA
- In office 1982–1983
- Preceded by: Dinesh Majumdar
- Succeeded by: Ashok Mitra
- Constituency: Jadavpur

Sankar Gupta (1940 - 1983) was an Indian Communist leader. He was a member of the Communist Party of India (Marxist). He was elected as a Member of the Legislative Assembly of West Bengal from Jadavpur constituency in 1982.

== Political career ==
=== Student Movement ===
During the turbulent sixties, when the hatred and terror against the Communists reigned supreme, Field Marshal K. M. Cariappa was launching an anti-Communist propaganda in a speech at the Jadavpur University campus, where he was intent to prove the Communists as seditious. Then Field Marshal K. M. Cariappa had asked "Is there a Communist in this room?" The student who could stand up bravely and proudly "Yes sir. Here is one. I am Sankar Gupta, I am a Communist" - a statement which later became legendary among the leftist student leaders in the years to follow.

One of the prime organisers of the Bengal Provincial Committee of the All India Students Federation, which split later in 1964 following ideological battle against revisionism, he along with the major fraction of the Bengal Provincial Committee took a leftist stand and the fraction came to be known as the BPSF (Left) or SF(Left). He married fellow SF(Left) leader Shyamali, who later became a member of CPI(M) Central Committee, and the All-India President of the All India Democratic Women's Association. As BPSF leaders, they took active role in organizing protest rallies against the Vietnam War in the sixties, and expressed solidarity with the Vietnamese people's struggle for liberty and socialism.

=== Education Movement ===
As his comrades Shyamal Chakraborty, Biman Bose, Subhas Chakraborty became wholetimers of the CPI(M), Sankar could not turn out to be one as he had to look after his family being the eldest son. He took a job in the Burul High School (near Nodakhali in South 24 Parganas district). He continued to instill fervour in the Students' Movement. In March 1967, he took a job as an assistant professor in the University of North Bengal. In the same year, he married Shyamali as she was released from prison. Even during the times of Naxal terror, he remained in Siliguri and continued to inspire the students, and organized the university teachers' movement. He was also a member of the West Bengal State Committee of the Democratic Youth Federation (which later merged into the Democratic Youth Federation of India).

=== Wholetime Political Worker ===
As Shyamali Gupta got a job in the Bankura College, he instantaneously decided to leave his job to be a full-time CPI(M) worker in the early seventies. In 1977, when Jyoti Basu became the Chief Minister of the 1st Left Front Government, Sankar Gupta was asked to be his Political Secretary. In 1982 assembly elections, Sankar Gupta contested and won from Jadavpur. He was made the Minister of Power in the 2nd Left Front Government. In 1983, he became the member of the CPI(M) West Bengal State Committee. He along with Shyamal Chakraborty met with a severe accident as they were heading towards Santaldih from Durgapur to stop the closure of the Santaldih Thermal Power Station. Even with ailing health as he hopped between hospitals for treatment, he continued his work to increase power generation.

== Death ==
He died at the age of 43, just one year into his tenure as a minister and as an MLA.
