= Rajeev Kumar =

Rajeev Kumar may refer to:

- Prof. Rajeev Kumar, Indian professor and activist
- Rajeev Kumar (Indian politician) (born 1956), former Director General of Police of the state of Jharkhand
- Rajeev Kumar (IPS) (born 1966), Indian Police Service officer
- Rajeev Kumar, Indian singer who competed on Sa Re Ga Ma Pa Challenge 2005

== See also ==
- Rajeev Kumar Singh (disambiguation)
- Rajeev Kumar Varshney (born 1973), Indian agriculture scientist
- Rajiv Kumar (disambiguation)
- T. K. Rajeev Kumar (born 1961), Indian Malayalam-language film director
