= Ganamukti Parishad =

Political party in India

- Ganamukti Parishad flag
- Abbreviation: GMP
- Formation: 1948; 78 years ago
- Founder: Dasarath Debbarma
- Legal status: Active
- Headquarters: Agartala
- Region served: Tripura
- General Secretary: Radhacharan Debbarma
- President: Naresh Jamatia
- Affiliations: Adivasi Adhikar Rashtriya Manch

Ganamukti Parishad (Bengali for 'Tripura State Indigenous People's Liberation Council') is a left-wing movement working amongst the Tripuri peoples of Tripura, in north-eastern India. It is affiliated with Communist Party of India (Marxist) as its tribal wing.

== Split ==
In March 1967, the party split into two factions:

- Tripura Rajya Ganamukti Parishad, attached to Communist Party of India
- Tripura Rajaer Upajati Ganamukti Parishad, attached to Communist Party of India (Marxist)

== Origins ==
During the 1940s the royal house of Tripura tried its best to maintain its political rule over the state. However, monarchy was challenged by movements that were influenced by the Indian National Congress and the Communist Party of India. These associations proposed democratic reforms, but were met with stern resistance from the royal house. In 1946 members of Janamangal Samiti (People's Welfare Association), Janasiksha Samiti (People's Educational Association), the local cell of the Communist Party and individual left-wingers got together to form the Tripura Rajya Prajamandal (Tripura State Popular Assembly). Prajamandal proposed a form of constitutional monarchy for the state.

The Prajamandal included both communists and non-communists. In 1948 a ban on the organisation was proposed, on the ground that the organisation was under the influence of communists in East Pakistan. This spurred the non-communist leaders of Prajamandal to try to expel the communists. However, the ban was enforced before the expulsion had taken place. Leaders of Prajamandal were arrested, and many cadres went into hiding. By not differentiating between communists and non-communists in repressing Prajamandal, the royal government indirectly contributed to increasing the support for the communist within the organisation. On Independence Day Prajamandal took out a militant manifestation in Agartala. Simultaneously, the movement started activating itself in the struggle for Tiprasas land rights. Following the Partition of India, a major wave of Bengali Hindus migrated to Tripura from East Pakistan. On the Tripura countryside Bengali money-lenders started to take over agricultural land from indebted Tiprasas. Prajamandal organised resistance, a struggle that radicalized the movement.

On several sites the movement resulted in clashes with the state forces. In October police firing in Bishalgarh killed nine Tiprasa and injured twenty more. The military set up camps in the tribal areas, with the objective of rooting out Prajamandal. The Prajamandal leadership considered that it had no possibility to cope with the increasing repression, and decided to dissolve the association.

In the void that emerged after the disappearance of Prajamandal, Tiprasa leaders founded the Tripura Rajaer Mukti Parishad (Tripura State Liberation Council, generally called Mukti Parishad). Mukti Parishad raised demands of withdrawal of the DIR and freedom of expression and association. The slogan of the movement was 'Democratic Rights for the People of Tripura'.

== Armed struggle ==
As Tripura was put under military rule in March 1949, the leadership of the Mukti Parishad went underground to escape arrests. In the tribal belts of the state armed resistance was organized by the GMP. Inspired by the advances of the Chinese People's Liberation Army, the Mukti Parishad set up the Shanti Sena (Peace Army), which routed out the troops of the administration from the tribal belt. In the ‘liberated areas’ people's government was in command, with the Village Committees of GMP managing the everyday affairs. The tribals didn't have to pay any taxes to the state, nor would they turn to the courts of the state to express their queries. At the same time, a cultural revolution took place within the tribal society as abolition of child marriages, forced labour, excessive alcohol consumption, oppression of women, etc. were outlawed by the GMP.

== Entry into mainstream politics ==
Armed resistance lasted until 1951. Then the strategies changed as a result of the changes in the political climate of the state. The Communist Party had begun to operate over-ground. In the end of 1949 the leaders of GMP had joined CPI. Now the struggle of the GMP was to be taken overground, in cooperation with CPI. In the first parliamentary elections of India in 1952 both seats of the Lok Sabha (2nd chamber of the Indian parliament) were won by the CPI. Both of the elected MPs, Biren Dutta and Dasarth Deb, were stalwarts of the GMP. Deb, the president of GMP, was at the time of election still considered as a guerrilla leader on the run by the police. The cases against him were not dropped until he was pardoned by the Prime Minister Jawaharlal Nehru himself after having reached the parliament premises incognito for his first session.

== 1967 conference ==
GMP-TYF election poster in favour of Communist Party of India (Marxist)

It should be mentioned that although the bulk of the leadership as well as the common members of the GMP were tribals, the GMP was not an exclusively Tiprasa organization at this time (Biren Dutta, for example was a Bengali). After the end of the armed struggle, an intense debate surged within the CPI concerning the future role of the GMP. Some considered that the GMP, whose membership was overwhelmingly agrarian, should be integrated into the peasant mass organization of the party, AIKS, and that Tiprasas and Bengali peasants should fight together since their class interests were the same. Other, such as Deb, considered that the tribals were not merely peasants but also constituted a separate sub-national entity and that the GMP should be a Tiprasa organization articulating the sub-nationalist consciousness of the tribal community.

In the beginning of the 1960s CPI suffered a severe internal division. The party was split into two camps on issues such as the relationship to the Congress party and the Sino-Soviet polemic. In 1964 the split was a fact, as two separate party congresses were held, one by CPI and the other by Communist Party of India (Marxist). The split also came to divide the Tripura unit of the CPI, with the CPI(M) soon having outmanovered the CPI in Tripura. Initially both factions agreed that the GMP ought to stay intact and that it would be spared from the split for the sake of unity of the mass organization movement, but soon competition over control over the organization started. At the GMP conference of 1967 the split had also reached the GMP, and CPI(M) formed Tripura Rajaer Upajati Ganamukti Parishad and its leader within the GMP, Deb, who were able to gather the support of the broad majority of the organization. At the same conference the GMP was re-christened as the Upajati (i.e., Tribal) Ganamukti Parishad. Subsequently, non-tribals were no longer able to obtain GMP membership. Thus Deb's thesis that Tiprasa constituted as separate subnationalist entity and needed a mass organization of their own had been implemented in the organizational practice.

Following the 1967 conference CPI formed Tripura Rajya Ganamukti Parishad, led by Aghore Debbarma.

== ATPLO merger ==
In 1983 the All Tripura Peoples Liberation Organization of Binanda Jamatya gave up their arms and were integrated into the Ganamukti Parishad. ATPLO had surged as a splinter group of the Tripura National Volunteers, and a turf war between the TNV soon turned into a bloody fight. In the end, ATPLO found no other viable solution than to align with their former enemies and thus merge into GMP.

== The organisation today ==
Today the Tripura Rajaer Upajati Ganamukti Parishad is affiliated with the All India Kisan Sabha, the peasant mass-organization of the Communist Party of India (Marxist) (CPI(M)). GMP does, however, maintain its own organizational character as an entirely tribal organization. Similarly, as the GMP is an affiliate to the AIKS, the Tribal Youth Federation is affiliated to the Democratic Youth Federation of India and the Tribal Students Union is affiliated to the Students Federation of India. However at the same time as these organizations belong to different all India structures, they are organizationally interlinked. The general secretary and president of TYF are by tradition elected as members of the secretariat of the GMP. The GMP, TYF and TSU use other flags, symbols and publications than their all India bodies. The leadership of these three organizations are referred to as Central Committees, whereas the state leaderships of the AIKS, DYFI and SFI are referred to as State Committees.

By 2000 it claimed a membership of 70 000. It president is Naresh Jamatia and its general secretary is Radhacharan Debbarma.

== Bibliography ==
- Basu, Pradip Kumar; The Communist Movement in Tripura, Calcutta: Progressive Publishers, 1996
- Deb, Dasarath; Mukti Parishader Itikatha, Kolkata: National Book Agency, 1999
