= Dinesh Majumdar =

Indian politician (1937-1980)

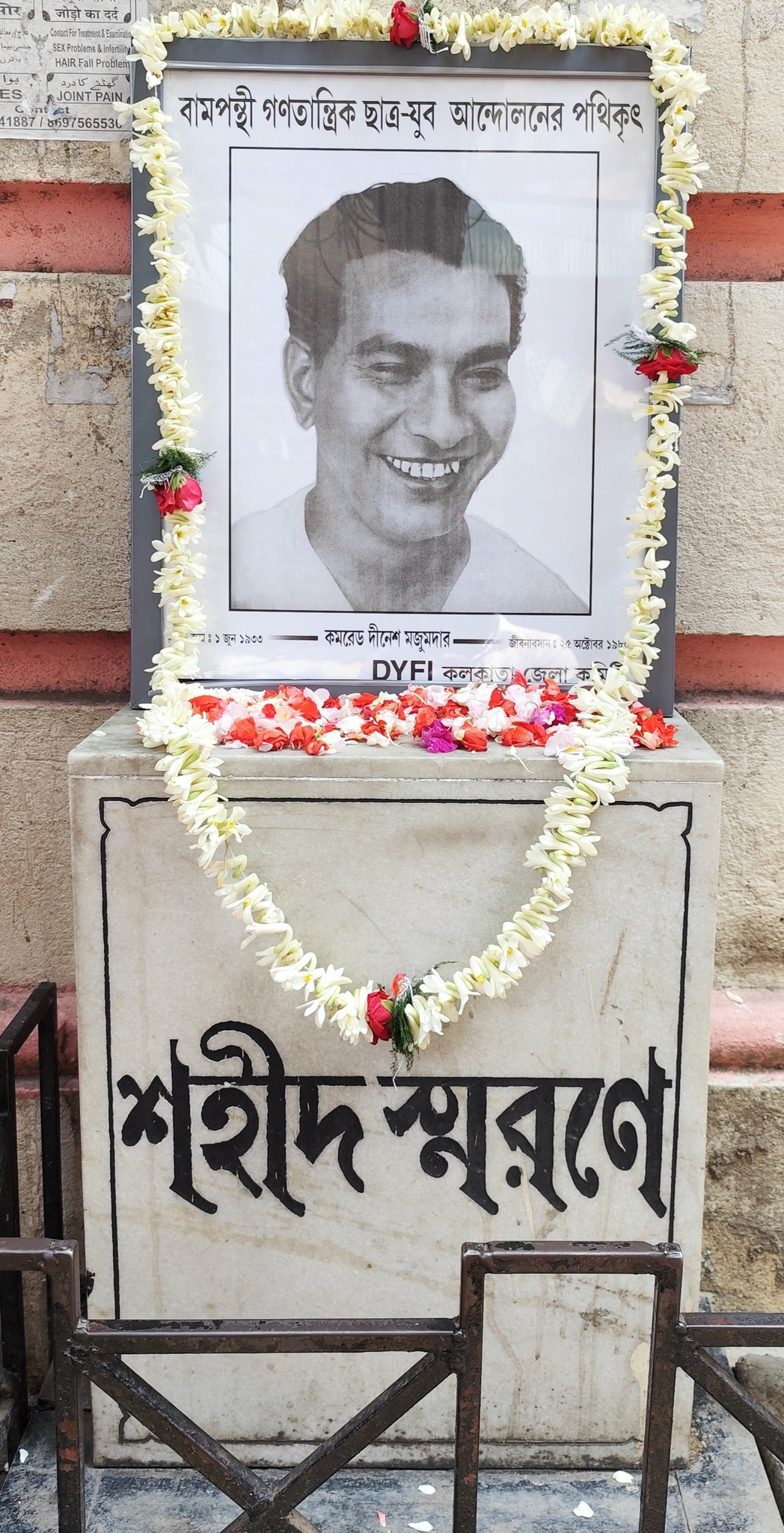

Member of West Bengal Legislative Assembly
- In office 1971–1982
- Preceded by: Bikash Chandra Guha
- Succeeded by: Sankar Gupta
- Constituency: Jadavpur

Chief Government Whip, West Bengal Legislative Assembly
- In office 1977–1980
- Preceded by: Gyan Singh Sohanpal
- Succeeded by: Ashoke Kumar Bose

President of Democratic Youth Federation of India
- In office 1968–1979
- Preceded by: Position established
- Succeeded by: Amitabha Basu

Personal details
- Born: 1 June 1937 Dhaka District, Bengal Presidency, British India
- Died: 25 October 1980 (aged 43) Kolkata, West Bengal, India
- Spouse: Jyotshna Majumdar

Dinesh Majumdar was a Marxist visionary and youth communist leader. A legendary student leader of the 1950s to the 1970s and a pioneer of the youth movement from the mid-1960s. He was a three-term member of the West Bengal Legislative Assembly between 1971 and 1980.

== Early life ==
Dinesh Majumdar was born on 1 June 1937 in Galimpur village of Nawabganj police station of Sadar sub-division of Dhaka district. After the partition of India, his family moved first to Howrah, then to Rupasreepalli, near Ranaghat, West Bengal.

He graduated from Rishi Bankim Chandra College in Naihati and Bangabasi College in Calcutta, both under the University of Calcutta.

== Political career ==
He gradually became a student leader of the All India Students' Federation and later Bengal Provincial Students' Federation in the 1950s and 1960s.

He sided with Communist Party of India (Marxist) after it split from the Communist Party of India in 1964.

In 1968, when the Democratic Youth Federation was established in West Bengal as the youth association of CPI(M), he was elected as its founding president. He continued in that position till 1979. Buddhadeb Bhattacharjee was elected along with him as the secretary of DYF.

He was elected to the West Bengal Legislative Assembly in 1971. He was re-elected in 1972, despite rampant rigging and violence on election day by Congress hoodlums.

Majumdar is remembered for his work towards eradicating unemployment. He also led a rally to declare 28 March as anti-employment day in West Bengal.

He was one of the few CPI(M) candidates elected in the 1972 West Bengal Legislative Assembly election. He was again elected in 1977.

After the Left Front government was formed in West Bengal after the 1977 West Bengal Legislative Assembly election, Majumdar was appointed as the Chief Government Whip.

He continued to serve as an MLA and Chief Government Whip till his death in 1980.

== Personal life ==
He married Jyotsna Roy. The couple had one daughter. He died on 25 October 1980.

== Legacy ==
The building housing the DYFI West Bengal State headquarters and the Students' Federation of India is named after him as Dinesh Majumdar Bhawan.

The Left Front government had also named a library in central Kolkata as Dinesh Majumdar State Youth Library on 16 February 1983.
