= Minakshi Mukherjee =

Indian politician

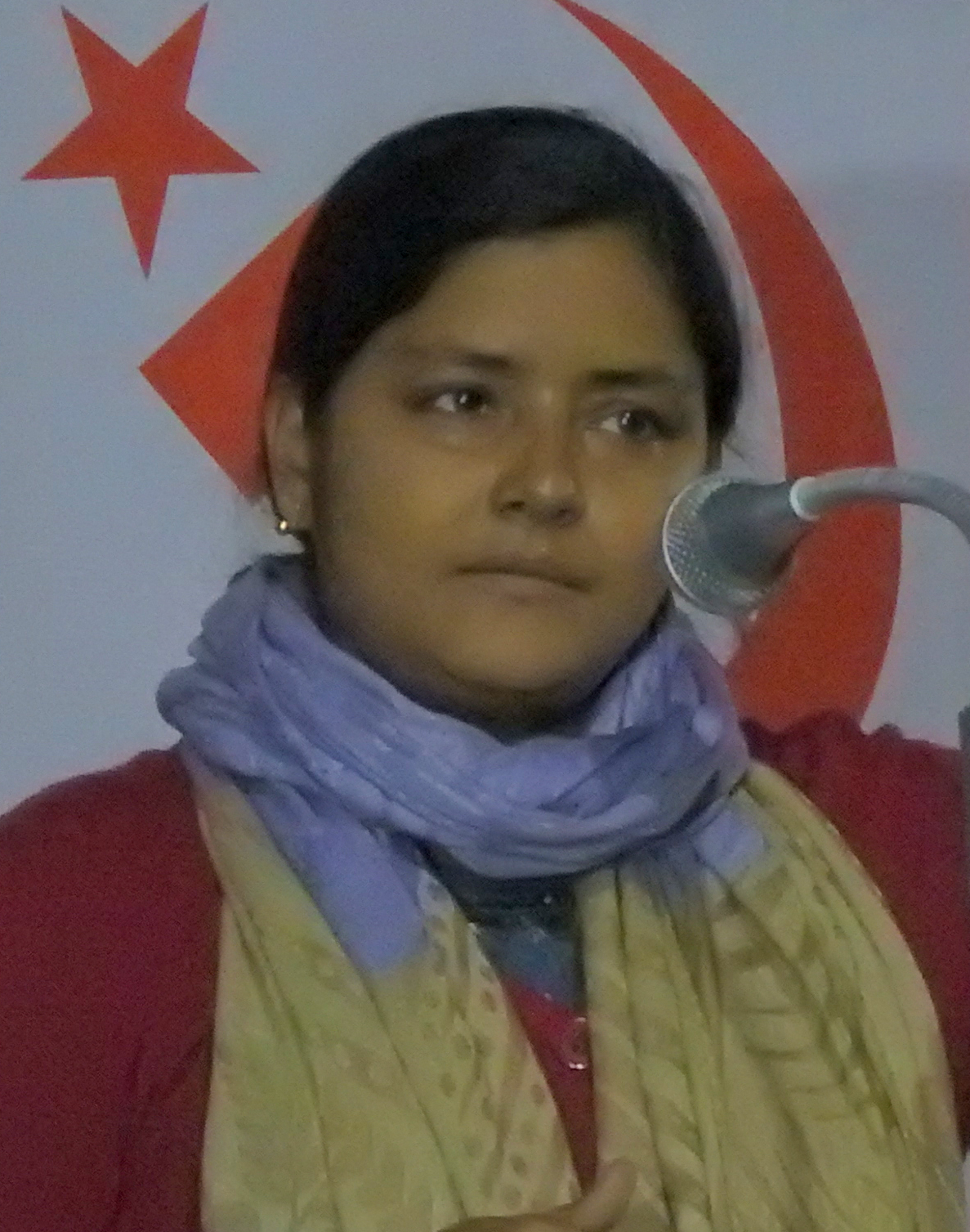

CPIM Central Committee
- Incumbent
- Assumed office 2025

West Bengal State Secretary, Democratic Youth Federation of India
- In office 2021–2025
- Preceded by: Sayandeep Mitra
- Succeeded by: Dhrubajyoti Saha

West Bengal State President Democratic Youth Federation of India
- In office 2018–2021
- Preceded by: Sayandeep Mitra
- Succeeded by: Dhrubajyoti Saha

Personal details
- Born: 1984 or 1985 (age 41–42) Kulti, West Bengal, India
- Party: Communist Party of India (Marxist)
- Education: M.A. in Political Science, Burdwan University
- Occupation: Politician

Minakshi Mukherjee is an Indian politician who is currently a member of Central committee in Communist Party of India (Marxist) and was formerly the state secretary of the Democratic Youth Federation of India, the youth wing of the Communist Party of India (Marxist). She contested as a Left Front candidate in the 2026 West Bengal Legislative Assembly Election from Uttarpara Assembly constituency.

== Early life and education ==
Minakshi was born in Kulti, West Bengal. She completed schooling at Jaladhi Kumari Devi Uchcha Balika Vidyalaya in Kulti. Her graduation was from Banwarilal Bhalotia College in Asansol and she later completed a master's degree in political science from Burdwan University.

== Political career ==
Minakshi Mukherjee started her activism through Students' Federation of India in her college days. She was later inducted into the Democratic Youth Federation of India (DYFI) local committee in 2008. Her leadership and public speaking skills helped her rise within DYFI, and by 2018, she became the state president of DYFI in West Bengal. In the same year, she also joined the state committee of the Communist Party of India (Marxist) in West Bengal.

In the 2021 West Bengal Legislative Assembly Election, she contested as the CPI(M) candidate in the high-profile constituency Nandigram, against the Trinamool Congress supremo Mamata Banerjee (the West Bengal Chief Minister) and the BJP candidate Suvendu Adhikari. Minakshi represented the Left-Congress-ISF alliance (Sanjukta Morcha) in Vidhan Sabha election.

On 11 February 2021, she participated in the 2021 Nabanna Abhijan from College Street to protest for jobs that was intended to present a list of demands to chief minister Mamata Banerjee at Nabanna, which ended with conflicting claims of how many protesters were hospitalized after the police responded, and prompted a 12-hour strike by the Left Front against police brutality. The injuries of the Nabanna protestors became a political issue in the upcoming election, and Mukherjee continued to emphasize the need for jobs in her campaign. However, she did not win the election.

On 5 October 2021, she became the first woman to serve as the state secretary of the Democratic Youth Federation of India.

In 2022, Mukherjee was prominent in the protest against the death of Anish Khan and briefly incarcerated. In 2024, she participated in the Left Front Grand Brigade Rally in Kolkata.
