= Manish Gupta =

Manish Gupta may refer to:

- Manish Gupta (director) (born 1975), Indian director and writer
- Manish Gupta (politician) (born 1942), Indian politician
