= Dyfi =

DYFI or Dyfi may refer to:

- River Dyfi, in Wales
- Democratic Youth Federation of India
- Did You Feel It? (DYFI), a community-science system for reporting earthquakes
