= Sujan Chakraborty =

Indian politician (born 1959)

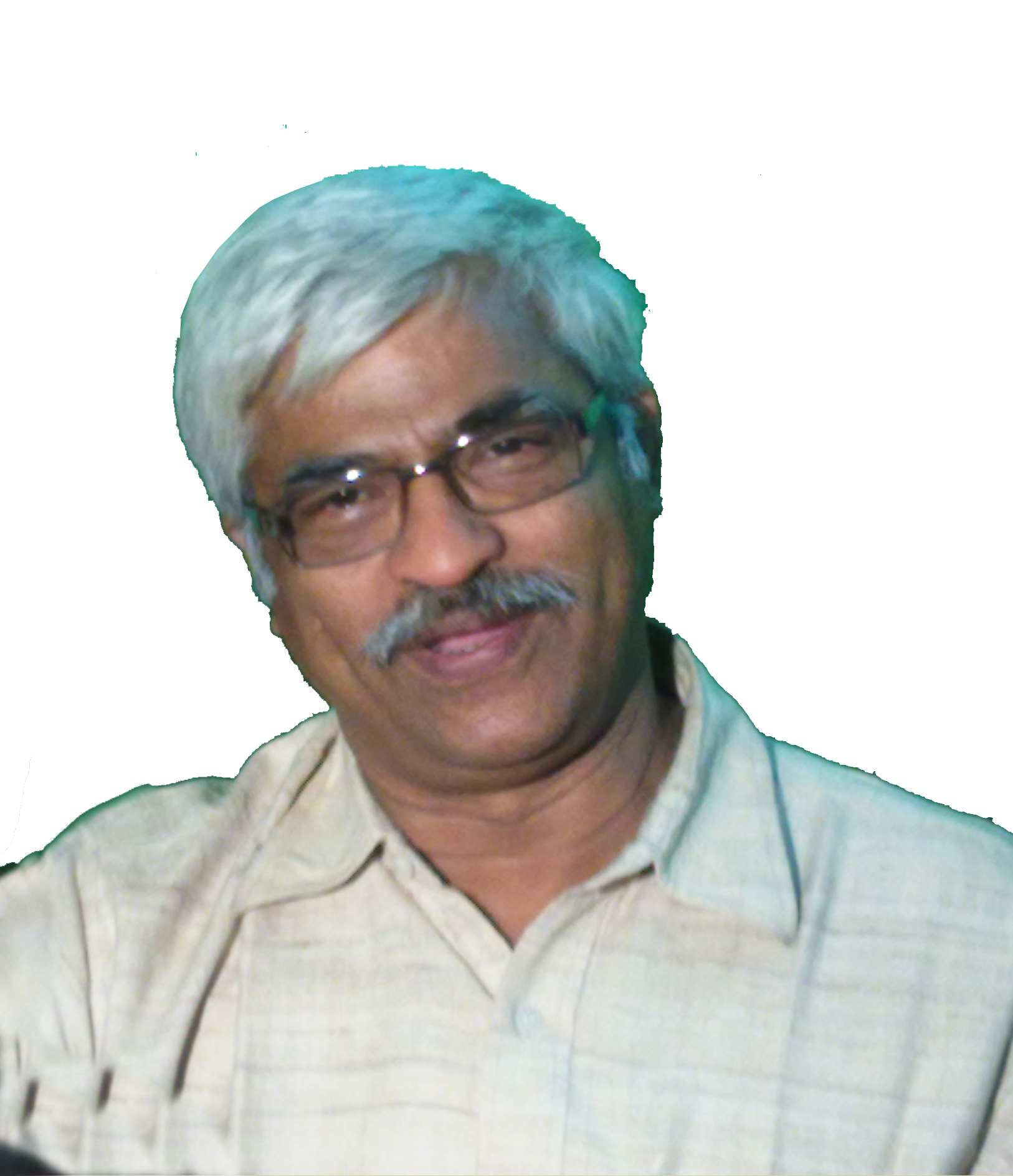

Member of West Bengal Legislative Assembly
- In office 19 May 2016 – 2 May 2021
- Preceded by: Manish Gupta
- Succeeded by: Debabrata Majumdar
- Constituency: Jadavpur
- In office 1998–2001
- Preceded by: Sovandeb Chattopadhyay
- Succeeded by: Arup Bhadra
- Constituency: Baruipur

Member of Parliament, Lok Sabha
- In office 13 May 2004 – 16 May 2009
- Preceded by: Krishna Bose
- Succeeded by: Kabir Suman
- Constituency: Jadavpur
- Majority: 89,668

Leader of Left Front in West Bengal Legislative Assembly
- In office May 2016 – May 2021
- Deputy: Narmada Chandra Roy

National Secretary of Communist Party of India (Marxist)
- Incumbent
- Assumed office 2015

Personal details
- Born: 16 March 1959 (age 67) Kalikapur, West Bengal, India
- Party: Communist Party of India (Marxist)
- Spouse: Mili Chakraborty
- Education: Jadavpur University

Sujan Chakraborty (born 16 March 1959) is an Indian politician and a member of the Communist Party of India (Marxist). He was the MLA of Jadavpur (Vidhan Sabha constituency) from 2016 to 2021. In the 2016 West Bengal Assembly elections, he defeated his nearest rival, Minister for Power in the Government of West Bengal, Manish Gupta of the Trinamool Congress. In 2021 he was defeated by Moloy Majumdar of AITC by a margin of 38869 votes. He was a member of the 14th Lok Sabha representing Jadavpur constituency in West Bengal state.

Chakraborty was the editor of Chhatra Sangram (Students' Struggle), the Bengali organ of the state unit of the Students Federation of India from 1986 to 1988. He was the Secretary of the state unit of the organisation from 1988 to 1993 and the General Secretary of its central body from 1993 to 1994. From 1996 to 2000 Chakraborty was a member of the state unit of the Centre of Indian Trade Unions. Later, he became a member of the General Council of the Centre of Indian Trade Unions. Member, (i) Indian Science Congress Association; (ii) Indian Pharmaceutical Association, (iii) Pharmacy Council of India, and (iv) West Bengal State Council of Technical Education; Written several articles on student movement, political and contemporary issues; presented research papers in various International Scientific Conferences in India and abroad. West Bengal State Committee (1988–93), West Bengal Pharmaceutical & Photochemical Development Corporation Ltd., 1996–2001; Infusion India Ltd., 1998–1999; West Bengal Rural Energy Development Corporation Ltd., 1999–2004.
