= Tribal Students Union =

Student Organisation

- Abbreviation: TSU
- Formation: August 19, 1978; 48 years ago
- Founder: Aghore Debbarma Rabindra Kishore Debbarma
- Founded at: Khowai
- Type: Student wing
- Legal status: Active
- Headquarters: Chhatra-Juva Bhawan, Melarmath, Agartala, Tripura
- Origins: Tripura
- Region served: India
- President: Dipshanu Debbarma
- General Secretary: Sujit Tripura
- Parent organization: Tribal Youth Federation
- Affiliations: Students' Federation of India

Tribal Students Union or TSU is a Student organisation of Tripura, it is affiliated to Students' Federation of India. The TSU is the student wing of the Communist Party of India (Marxist) in Tripura.

== History ==
Tribal Students' Union was founded by Aghore Debbarma on 19 and 20 August 1978 in a 2 days conference at Khowai Town Hall with 400 tribal delegates of the state. The founder President and General Secretary was Aghore Debbarma and Rabindra Kishore Debbarma (prominent Kokborok writer).

== Flag ==
On a white background, there will be a five-pointed green star in the middle of flag, to the left of the star will be written transversely TSU in green. The width and height ratio of the flag is 3:2.

== Foundation day ==
The Foundation day is celebrated on 19 August every year with due dignity and pays tribute to the martyrs.

== Activities ==
- 12 Sept 2014: TSU strongly opposed the Tipraland, the separate state demanded by Indigenous People's Front of Tripura.
- 12 Sept 2017: TSU and SFI together win the college council election in all 22 general degree colleges and secured 751 seats out of 778 seats.
- 20 Dec 2019: TSU protest against CAA at Melarmath, Agartala.
- 6 Jan 2020: TSU held demonstration to protest against the violence in Jawaharlal Nehru University and demanded the resignation of Home Minister Amit Shah for “failing to protect” students.
- 3 Aug 2022: TSU held a protest by blocking the road of Agartala city demanding the deployment of adequate teachers in all the schools across the state.

== See also ==
- Tribal Youth Federation
- Tripuri people
- Dasarath Deb
- Aghore Debbarma
- Tripura Janasiksha Samiti
- Ganamukti Parishad
