= Red Volunteers =

- Established: 22 April 2021; 5 years ago
- Type: Nonprofit; Politically funded Voluntary
- Legal status: Active
- Headquarters: Kolkata
- Region served: India (mainly in West Bengal, also active in Kerala, Rajasthan, Tamil Nadu, Punjab, Assam, Bihar Telangana, New Delhi and Tripura)
- Members: More than 1.5 Lakhs
- Parent organization: Communist Party of India (Marxist)
- Volunteers: ~ 1 lakh (in West Bengal)
- Website: https://www.redvolunteers.org/ (West Bengal)

Red Volunteers is an Indian left-wing non-profit political, beneficiary and voluntary organization founded by the Democratic Youth Federation of India and the Students Federation of India.

== Background ==
Red volunteers was founded as a voluntary organisation amid the COVID-19 and oxygen crisis in West Bengal. The 2021 West Bengal Assembly elections were held amid the COVID-19 pandemic. Election rallies and campaigns were done, triggering the pandemic more stronger. Soon, people face severe oxygen shortages because of surging COVID-19 cases and low vaccination rates. Red Volunteers was launched in Kolkata with just 83 members, to deliver medical and social help to the distressed and sick people in spite of its parent party CPI(M) getting no seats in the last assembly election.

The Red Volunteers Facebook group has over 1.3 Lakh members as of August 2021, and is flooded with distress requests, around 3,000 each day.

The name "Red Volunteers" was suggested by CPI(M) leader Samik Lahiri.

== Works ==
=== Medical wellbeing ===
Red Volunteers is involved in numerous social activities like delivering oxygen, food, medicines to the needy patients. Also they conduct door to door RT-PCR in many areas. The each district group mainly functions through four or five team. One team looks after the oxygen needs. Another group arranges food, groceries, medicines for patients or families who cannot go out. Another team keeps database of beds available at hospitals and nursing homes. One of the team keeps in touch with COVID-19 patients whose oxygen saturation level is low or until the patient recovers. Also a team coordinates the entire operations.

According to Arnab Das, an SFI state committee member and representative of Red Volunteers in Konnagar, on an average Red Volunteers got at least 8 requests per day only in the Uttarpara Assembly. Akash Kar, an SFI member activist and a member of the Red Volunteers Ashoknagar group, said his team attends to at least 150 to 200 distress calls every day.

Even other party MLAs have kept faith on them. BJP MLA Parthasarathi Chatterjee who was effected by Corona and needed of Oxygen, Red Volunteers delivered them Oxygen even being politically opposite. Red Volunteers sanitized many places including the other party offices.

=== Other activities ===
Along with medical wellbeing, these volunteers are also keeping track of the social development of the people living in remote areas of the state as they are left untouched by the urban areas due to lack of proper infrastructure. Red Volunteers of CPIM joined hands with the villagers to repair rural roads at Pakuria village in Khejuri, as the roads had become unmotorable and couldn't be used for walking with the arrival of the monsoon. As, the local Panchayat was taking no action after several requests, Red Volunteers went down to roads to help.

Red Volunteers also run Red Canteens and Red kitchens for faster and low price food deliveries.

They also provide Red Ambulance services with CITU for faster patient delivery help.

== Reception ==
Red Volunteers have got great positive response, with nearly no complaints. Popular celebrities like Sourav Ganguly, Sreelekha Mitra, Badshah Moitra, Kamaleshwar Mukherjee, Rahul Banerjee etc. have praised Red Volunteers massively. Actress Sreelekha Mitra has termed them as "Oxygen of Bengal". One user wrote on the Red Volunteers’ Facebook page that she has always been "a TMC supporter". But she lavished praise on the Red Volunteers. "Apart from helping the people they've kept in touch with the patients...I bow down to these boys and girls today." Appreciating the role of the Red Volunteers, a man from Khejuri praised them and said: "We are thankful that at least these youths are by our side in such difficult times."

=== Notable donations ===
Red Volunteers received a large number of donations for their good voluntary work. Popular celebrities like Sourav Ganguly, Sreelekha Mitra, Badshah Moitra, Kamaleshwar Mukherjee, Rahul Banerjee etc. have donated to them too. BCCI President and former Cricketer "Dada" Sourav Ganguly donated two Oxygen Concentrators.

The alumni association of BE college has decided to medically insure about 159 frontline Red Volunteers spanning the major districts. Under the scheme each volunteer has been insured for Rs two lakhs if needed.

The alumni association of the Scottish Church College Kolkata formed a corpus of Rs eight lakh for helping people, in which they decided to donated Rs 25,000 to the volunteers. They have also reached out to the 48 Red Volunteers' groups across the state.

National Medical College alumni donated Rs 75,000 to the SFI for the volunteers' programme in West Bengal . The AIDWA gifted an oxygen cylinder to the Volunteers as well. Even many leaders of other parties like BJP MLA Suman Kanjilal, TMC leader Avijit Roy have donated their whole salary to help the Red Volunteers.

=== Reaction of state government ===
Despite Red Volunteers' massive volunteery work, the state Government refused to support them. They did not accept them as front-line workers and denied Vaccine.

According to Srijan Bhattacharya, a SFI activist and Red Volunteer, "Many volunteers have been attacked by Trinamul goons after 2 May. Female members have been abused over phone. Some of our own party members asked us to withdraw the service. But an overwhelming majority of volunteers decided to carry on,". DYFI's Kolkata head Kalatan Dasgupta alleged the Government and said that while civil society came forward to help the volunteers, the state government is unable to think outside political machinations and come to the people's aid during a pandemic.

== See also ==
- Sramajibi Canteen
- Communist Party of India (Marxist)
