= Sramajibi Canteen =

Community kitchen chain in India

- শ্রমজীবী ক্যান্টিন
- Established: April 2020
- Founded at: Jadavpur
- Legal status: Active
- Region served: West Bengal
- Parent organization: Communist Party of India (Marxist)

Sramajibi Canteen is a community kitchen chain in India, mainly active in West Bengal, run by Communist Party of India (Marxist), a national political party in India. Sramajibi Canteen has seen a good involvement of youths from SFI, DYFI and from the society. Along with CPI(M) workers, who run it, people from the civil society, film industry, educational institutes etc. have taken part in this. The Jadavpur Sramajibi Canteen is the state's longest-running community kitchen in West Bengal till now. As of July 2021, more than 20 Sramajibi Canteens are functioning in the whole state of West Bengal.

The daily cost of running the kitchens vary between ₹10,000-20,000 and the money comes entirely from party fund and donations.

== Formation ==
During the COVID-19 pandemic in West Bengal, the CPI(M) local committee in Jadavpur started feeding economically weak people in local. Gradually it became the community kitchen named "Sramajibi Canteen", which means Canteen for working class. The concept came from Sudip Sengupta, a CPI(M) Kolkata district committee member. During lockdown, it distributed food to thousands of poor people. After the lockdown ended, the kitchen started offering cooked food at Rs 20 a packet which includes 2-3 items such as chicken, egg, fish or paneer curry besides rice. On some days people get sweets too.

== Branches ==
Sramajibi Canteen has branches in Jadavpur, Raiganj, Fairlie, New Alipore, Bally, Jhargram and many other places in West Bengal.

Jadavpur Sramajibi Canteen was the first to be set up as a community kitchen in Jadavpur in south Kolkata to offer cooked lunch free or in very less price to poor people. It became so popular that around a thousand people visited it every day at the height of the lockdown. It is considered as the oldest community kitchen in West Bengal.

Raiganj Sramajibi Canteen was the first to be set up outside Kolkata. The canteen started from 1 September, near the NH-34, feeding 150-200 people on first day.

== Reception ==
Sramajibi Canteen received positive responses from the Civil society and specially from the working-class people.

Film director Anik Dutta, actor Badshah Moitra, film director Srijit Mukherjee, actor Rwitobroto Mukherjee, social activist Joyraj Bhattachadya, actor Anirban Bhattacharya, dancer Srabanti Bhattacharya, and others have praised the activity and donated to provide affordable meal parcels to poor people.

Impressed by the service, many eminent people such as doctors, actors, singers have been celebrating their birthdays or anniversaries by donating money for the food and physically serving the packets. Even people from outside states have donated for this cause.

Even a drama was performed in USA regarding the social service of Sramajibi Canteen.

== See also ==
- Red Volunteers
- Communist Party of India (Marxist)
