= TYF =

TYF may refer to:

- Ten Yard Fight
- Tribal Youth Federation (A left wing youth organisation in Tripura)
- Turkish Sailing Federation (Türkiye Yelken Federasyonu)
- Turkish Swimming Federation (Türkiye Yüzme Federasyonu)
