= SFI Rajasthan =

SFI jaipur rajasthan
- SFI Flag
- Formation: 30 December 1970; 55 years ago
- Type: Student organization
- Legal status: Active
- Purpose: Unite & Fight To Save Education, Save Nation & Defeat Communalism
- Headquarters: jaipur Rajasthan
- Members: 5.5k
- President: pradeep mandota
- Secretary: rajkumar varma
- Website: SFI Rajasthan

SFI Rajasthan is the State Committee (state wing) of the Students' Federation of India

(SFI) serves in the state of Rajasthan.
