= Sarbori Mukherjee =

Indian politician (born 1970)

Member of the West Bengal Legislative Assembly
- Incumbent
- Assumed office 4 May 2026
- Preceded by: Debabrata Majumdar
- Constituency: Jadavpur

Personal details
- Born: August 8, 1970 (age 56) Calcutta, West Bengal, India
- Party: Bharatiya Janata Party
- Occupation: Actress, Politician
- Profession: Politician

Sarbori Mukherjee (born 8 August, 1970) is an Indian actress and politician from West Bengal. She is a member of the West Bengal Legislative Assembly from Jadavpur Assembly constituency in South 24 Parganas district, representing the Bharatiya Janata Party.

Mukherjee is from Tollyganj, West Bengal. She married Manoj Kumar Saha, a artiste. She did her Bachelor of Arts at a college affiliated with Burdwan University in 1991. She declared assets worth Rs.86 lakhs in her affidavit to the Election Commission of India.

She won the Jadavpur Assembly constituency representing the Bharatiya Janata Party in the 2026 West Bengal Legislative Assembly election. She polled 1,06,199 votes and defeated her nearest rival, Debabrata Majumdar of the Trinamool Congress, by a margin of 27,716 votes.

== See also ==
- 2026 West Bengal Legislative Assembly election
- List of chief ministers of West Bengal
- West Bengal Legislative Assembly
- 18th West Bengal Assembly
