= Rajiv Kumar =

Rajiv Kumar may refer to:

- Jaani (songwriter) (born Rajiv Kumar, 1989), Indian songwriter and music composer
- Rajiv Kumar (civil servant) (born 1960), 25th Chief Election Commissioner of India
- Rajiv Kumar (economist) (born 1951), Indian economist
- Rajiv Kumar (cricketer) (born 1976), Indian cricketer
- Rajiv Kumar (Social & Political Leader), Founder and National Secretary General Garhpura Namak Satyagrah Gaurav Yatra Samiti, Founder and General Secretary of ECR Rail Yatri Sangh and Rail Road Yatri Sangh

== See also ==
- Rajeev Kumar (disambiguation)
- Rajive Kumar (born 1958), Indian Administrative Service officer
