= Shyamal Chakraborty =

Indian politician from West Bengal, India (1944–2020)

Member of Parliament, Rajya Sabha
- In office 2008–2014
- Preceded by: Sheikh Khabir Uddin Ahmed
- Succeeded by: Ritabrata Banerjee
- Constituency: West Bengal

Minister of Transport, Government of West Bengal
- In office 1982–1996
- Preceded by: Mohammed Amin
- Succeeded by: Subhas Chakraborty

Member of West Bengal Legislative Assembly
- In office 1981–1996
- Preceded by: Suhrid Mullick Chowdhury
- Succeeded by: Paresh Paul
- Constituency: Maniktala

Personal details
- Born: 5 February 1944 Khulna, Bengal Presidency, British India
- Died: 6 August 2020 (aged 76) Kolkata, West Bengal, India
- Party: Communist Party of India (Marxist) (from 1964)
- Other political affiliations: Communist Party of India (till 1964)
- Children: Ushasie Chakraborty
- Education: University of Calcutta
- Profession: Politician, columnist

Shyamal Chakraborty (5 February 1944 – 6 August 2020) was an Indian politician and trade unionist, who was a member of the Rajya Sabha from 2008 to 2014 from West Bengal. He was also a member of West Bengal Legislative Assembly and a minister in the government of West Bengal.

== Early life ==
Chakraborty was born to Sushil Chakraborty and Anupama Devi on 5 February 1944. He was born in Shivpur village in Khulna district in present day Bangladesh.

After partition, his family moved to West Bengal and settled in Motijheel refugee colony in Dumdum.

He did his schooling in Baidyanath Institution in Dumdum and graduated from Dumdum Motijheel College and Vidyasagar College.

== Early political life ==
Chakraborty became a member of undivided Communist Party of India in 1960 and joined the Communist Party of India (Marxist) after the split in 1964.

He was a leading organisor in students' movements in West Bengal, particularly in Kolkata.

He was also the President of the Students' Federation of India West Bengal State Committee from 1973 to 1979 and All India Joint Secretary.

He was jailed for a period of a year and stayed underground for six months.

== Political career ==
He was elected to the West Bengal Legislative Assembly in 1981 in a byelection from Maniktala (Vidhan Sabha constituency). He remained a member till 1996, when he lost.

He was elected to the state Committee of the Party in 1978 and the Central Committee in 2002.

He was the Transport Minister of West Bengal from 1982 to 1996.

After losing the election, he gradually moved to the labour movement in the state. He led the West Bengal Centre of Indian Trade Unions as its state president for around two decades.

Com Shyamal Chakraborty was elected in the national secretariat of CITU in 1991 and was in that position as vice president till the 2017, and got voluntarily relieved from that position in the 16th conference of CITU held in 2020.

Rajya Sabha

He was elected to the Rajya Sabha in 2008 and served till 2014 from West Bengal. As a member of Rajya Sabha, he was associated with Committee on Petitions, Committee on Energy, Consultative Committee for the Ministry of Road Transport and Highways, Railway Convention Committee, Committee on Member of Parliament Local Area Development Scheme, and National Welfare Board for Seafarers.

He also visited Switzerland, U.S.S.R., China, Bangladesh, Sri Lanka, Cuba, Germany, Austria, U.K., U.S.A., France, Italy, Spain and Vietnam as member of different government delegations.

== Personal life ==
He was married to Shipra Bhoumick on 25 June 1971. The couple had a daughter, Ushashi Chakraborty. However, Shipra passed away a few years later and Chakraborty raised Ushashi as a single-father.

Ushashi is a successful actress in Bengali film and television.

He along with Sankar Gupta met with a severe accident as they were heading towards Santaldih from Durgapur to stop the closure of the Santaldih Thermal Power Station. The accident led to lifelong ailments.

== Death ==
He died on 6 August 2020, at age 76, from cardiac arrest after being diagnosed with COVID-19 during the COVID-19 pandemic in India.

== Published works ==
- সমাজতন্ত্র কী আবং কেন (What is Socialism and Why?), 1978,
- কাশ্মীর -অতীত, বর্তমান এবং ভবিষ্যৎ(Kashmir Past, Present and Future), 1998,
- তিন প্রসঙ্গ(Three Issues), 2001,
- গরু ও ত্রিশূল(Cow and Trident), 2001,
- আর্যরা কি ভারতের আদিম অধিবাসী (Whether Aryans are Aboriginal in India), 2002,
- ঝড়ের খেয়া (Boat in the Storm), 2008
- ছাত্র আন্দোলন ৬০:৭০ (Students' Movement 60:70), 2010;

Booklets

- Unorganised Worker in West Bengal, 2005
- On Retail Trade, 2007
