= Jadavpur Assembly constituency =

Legislative Assembly constituency in West Bengal, India

Jadavpur
- Constituency No. 150 for the West Bengal Legislative Assembly
- Interactive Map Outlining Jadavpur Assembly Constituency

Constituency details
- Country: India
- Region: East India
- State: West Bengal
- District: South 24 Parganas
- Lok Sabha constituency: Jadavpur
- Established: 1967
- Total electors: 299,710
- Reservation: None

Member of Legislative Assembly
- 18th West Bengal Legislative Assembly
- Incumbent Sarbori Mukherjee
- Party: BJP
- Alliance: NDA
- Elected year: 2026

Jadavpur Assembly constituency is a Legislative Assembly constituency of South 24 Parganas district in the Indian state of West Bengal.

The constituency is considered to be a bastion of Communist Party of India (Marxist), but the party lost it in 2021 West Bengal Legislative Assembly election. As the electoral constituency of former Chief minister Buddhadeb Bhattacharjee, it is one of the most prestigious seat in the state.

Most Successful parties from Jadavpur Vidhansabha
1. Communist Party of India (Marxist) (13 times) 86.67 (81.6%)
2. Trinamool Congress (2 times) 13.33 (12.5%)
3. Bharatiya Janata Party (1 time) 6.25 (5.88%)

== Overview ==
As per order of the Delimitation Commission in respect of the Delimitation of constituencies in the West Bengal, Jadavpur Assembly constituency is composed of the following:

- Ward Nos. 96, 99, 101, 102, 103, 104, 105, 106, 109 and 110 of Kolkata Municipal Corporation.

Borough	Ward No.	Councillor	2021 Winner
X	96	Vasundhara Goswami	Trinamool Congress
X	99	Mitali Banerjee	Trinamool Congress
XII	101	Bappaditya Dasgupta	Trinamool Congress
XII	102	Sima Ghosh	Trinamool Congress
XI	103	Nandita Roy	Communist Party of India (Marxist)
XI	104	Tarakeswar Chakraborty	Trinamool Congress
XII	105	Sushila Mondal	Trinamool Congress
XII	106	Arijit Das Thakur	Trinamool Congress
XII	109	Ananya Banerjee	Trinamool Congress
XI	110	Swaraj Kumar Mondal	Trinamool Congress

Jadavpur Assembly constituency is part of No. 22 Jadavpur Lok Sabha constituency. Earlier, before 2011, Jadavpur assembly constituency was consist of Ward Nos. 101, 102, 103, 104, 105, 106 107, 108, 109, 110, 111 112, 113, 114 of Kolkata Municipal Corporation.

== Members of the Legislative Assembly ==
Year	Name	Party
1967	Bikash Chandra Guha	Communist Party of India (Marxist)
1969	Bikash Chandra Guha	Communist Party of India (Marxist)
1971	Dinesh Majumdar	Communist Party of India (Marxist)
1972	Dinesh Majumdar	Communist Party of India (Marxist)
1977	Dinesh Majumdar	Communist Party of India (Marxist)
1982	Shankar Gupta	Communist Party of India (Marxist)
1983^	Ashok Mitra	Communist Party of India (Marxist)
1987	Buddhadeb Bhattacharjee	Communist Party of India (Marxist)
1991	Buddhadeb Bhattacharjee	Communist Party of India (Marxist)
1996	Buddhadeb Bhattacharjee	Communist Party of India (Marxist)
2001	Buddhadeb Bhattacharjee	Communist Party of India (Marxist)
2006	Buddhadeb Bhattacharjee	Communist Party of India (Marxist)
2011	Manish Gupta	Trinamool Congress
2016	Sujan Chakraborty	Communist Party of India (Marxist)
2021	Debabrata Majumdar	Trinamool Congress
2026	Sarbori Mukherjee	Bharatiya Janata Party

- ^ denotes by-election

== Election results ==
=== 2026 ===
2026 West Bengal Legislative Assembly election: Jadavpur
Party	Candidate	Votes	%	±%
BJP	Sarbori Mukherjee	106,199	45.96	▲21.29
AITC	Debabrata Majumdar	78,483	33.96	▼11.58
CPI(M)	Bikash Ranjan Bhattacharya	41,148	17.81	▼9.69
NOTA	None of the above	1,976	0.86	▼0.41
Majority		27,716	12.0	▼6.04
Turnout		231,075	88.56	▲16.71
BJP gain from AITC		Swing	32.87	

=== 2021 ===
2021 West Bengal Legislative Assembly election
Party	Candidate	Votes	%	±%
AITC	Debabrata Majumdar	98,100	45.54	
CPI(M)	Sujan Chakraborty	59,231	27.50	
BJP	Rinku Naskar	53,139	24.67	
NOTA	None of the above	2,730	1.27	
Majority		38,869	18.04	
Turnout		215,419	71.85	
AITC gain from CPI(M)		Swing	13.20	

=== 2016 ===
2016 West Bengal Legislative Assembly election: Jadavpur
Party	Candidate	Votes	%	±%
CPI(M)	Sujan Chakraborty	98,977	49.50	+4.74
AITC	Manish Gupta	84,035	41.15	−12.16
BJP	Mohit Kumar Ray	13,922	6.82	+5.41
NOTA	None of the above	4,093	2.00	+2.00
BSP	Subhas Chandra Naskar	803	0.39	
Majority		14,942	8.35	
Turnout		2,04,210	74.58	
CPI(M) gain from AITC		Swing	15.87	

=== 2011 ===
2011 West Bengal Legislative Assembly election: Jadavpur
Party	Candidate	Votes	%	±%
AITC	Manish Gupta	103,972	53.31	+16.08#
CPI(M)	Buddhadeb Bhattacharjee	87,288	44.76	−16.49
BJP	Dhananjay Mukherjee	2,749	1.39	
BSP	Rabindra Nath Choudhury	693	0.35	
IND	Siddartha Bhattacharya	678	0.34	
Majority		16,684	8.45	
Turnout		1,99,096	78.41	
AITC gain from CPI(M)		Swing		

=== 2006 ===
In the 2006, 2001, 1996, 1991 and 1987 state assembly elections Buddhadeb Bhattacharjee of CPI(M) won the Jadavpur assembly seat, defeating Dipak Kumar Ghosh of Trinamool Congress in 2006,Madhabi Mukherjee of Trinamool Congress in 2001, Kakoli Ghosh Dastidar of Congress in 1996, Jyoti Prasanna Das Thakur of Congress in 1991, and Probhat Chatterjee of Congress in 1987.Sankar Gupta of CPI(M) defeated Sachin Mukherjee of Congress in 1982. Dinesh Chandra Majumder of CPI(M) defeated Santimoy Chatterjee of Janata Party in 1977.

=== 2001 ===
In the 2001 elections, Buddhadeb Bhattacharjee of CPI(M) defeated his nearest rival Madhabi Mukherjee of AITC

West Bengal assembly elections, 2001: Jadavpur constituency
Party	Candidate	Votes	%	±%
CPI(M)	Buddhadeb Bhattacharjee	110,011	54.60	+16.08#
AITC	Madhabi Mukherjee	80,730	40.06	−16.49
BJP	Radhesyham Brahmachari	5,166	2.56	
PDS	Samir Putatundu	1,798	0.89	
NCP	Asim Datta	1,438	0.71	
Independent	Maya Saha	1,083	0.54	
Independent	Bhusan Mondal	753	0.37	
Independent	Babua Dutta	520	0.26	
Turnout		207,85	69.90	
CPI(M) hold		Swing		

=== 1996 ===
West Bengal assembly elections, 1996: Jadavpur constituency
Party	Candidate	Votes	%	±%
CPI(M)	Buddhadeb Bhattacharjee	108,549	55.58	+16.08#
INC	Kakoli Ghosh Dastidar	72,364	37.05	−16.49
BJP	Rajat Roy	11,531	5.90	
BSP	Sandhya Mandal	1,130	0.58	
CPI(ML)L	Dhiresh Goswami	740	0.38	
Independent	Bhusan Mondal	440	0.54	
Independent	Deboshmita Dey	344	0.37	
Independent	Haradhan Sarkar	221	0.26	
Turnout		207,85	80.77	
CPI(M) hold		Swing		

=== 1967-1977 ===
Dinesh Chandra Majumder of CPI(M) won in 1972 and 1971. Bikash Chandra Guha of CPI(M) won in 1969 and 1967. The Jadavpur seat did not exist prior to that.
