= Debabrata Majumdar =

Indian politician

Member of the West Bengal Legislative Assembly
- In office 7 May 2021 – 4 May 2026
- Preceded by: Sujan Chakraborty
- Succeeded by: Sarbori Mukherjee
- Constituency: Jadavpur, Kolkata
- Majority: 38,869

Member of the Mayor-in-Council, KMC
- Incumbent
- Assumed office 2010
- 2010–: Solid Waste Management
- Mayor: Sovan Chatterjee; Firhad Hakim
- Constituency: 97 (2010-2015),(2021–present); 96 (2000–2010),(2015-2021)
- 2012: Assessment and Collection

Personal details
- Born: Moloy Majumdar; 25 April 1964 (age 62) Bijoygarh, Jadavpur, West Bengal, India
- Party: Mamata All India Trinamool Congress (2026 - Present)
- Other political affiliations: All India Trinamool Congress (2009-2026) Bharatiya Janata Party (1990–2009)
- Education: Chartered Accountant, F.C.A
- Alma mater: Institute of Chartered Accountants; Calcutta University
- Occupation: Politician
- Profession: Accountant

Debabrata Majumdar, also known as Moloy (born 25 April 1964), is an Indian politician from West Bengal, who has been serving as a member of the West Bengal Assembly from the Jadavpur seat since 7 May 2021. A member of the Trinamool Congress, he is a sitting ward corporator of the Kolkata Municipal Corporation from Ward No. 97 (since 2021) and Ward No. 96 (2000–2021).

== Early life ==
Majumder was born on 25 April 1964 in Kolkata. His father was Keshab Majumdar. Before joining politics, he worked as a chartered accountant. He earned a B.Com (Hons) from the University of Calcutta in 1985 and completed his studies at the Institute of Chartered Accountants of India in 1990.

== Career ==
Majumder was a member of the Bharatiya Janata Party in the late 1990s. In 2000, he was elected as a corporator from Ward 96 and was re-elected in 2005 and 2015. He later joined the Trinamool Congress and was re-elected as a ward corporator in the 2021 Kolkata Municipal Corporation election. Since 2010, he has been a member of the Mayor-in-Council (MMiC) holding the charge of the Solid Waste Management department. From January to November 2012, he held additional responsibilities in the Assessment and Collection department.
