= Chhatra Sangram =

Bengali magazine

Chhatra Sangram (meaning Student's Struggle in English) is a Bengali magazine, the organ of the Students' Federation of India, West Bengal state committee. It has been published since 1964 and played a great role in developing the leftist student movement in West Bengal. Neo Prints is the publisher of the magazine. Its circulation in January–February 2011 was nearly 30,000 copies.

Anil Biswas is the founder editor of the magazine.

== See more ==
- Students Struggle
