= COVID-19 pandemic in West Bengal =

Ongoing COVID-19 viral pandemic in West Bengal, India

- Disease: COVID-19
- Pathogen: SARS-CoV-2
- Location: West Bengal, India
- First outbreak: Wuhan, Hubei, China
- Index case: Kolkata
- Arrival date: 18 March 2020 (6 years, 5 months and 4 days)
- Date: 1 November 2021
- Confirmed cases: 16,05,794
- Active cases: 8,027
- Recovered: 15,78,434
- Deaths: 19,333
- Fatality rate: 1.20%
- Territories: All 23 districts

Government website
- www.wbhealth.gov.in

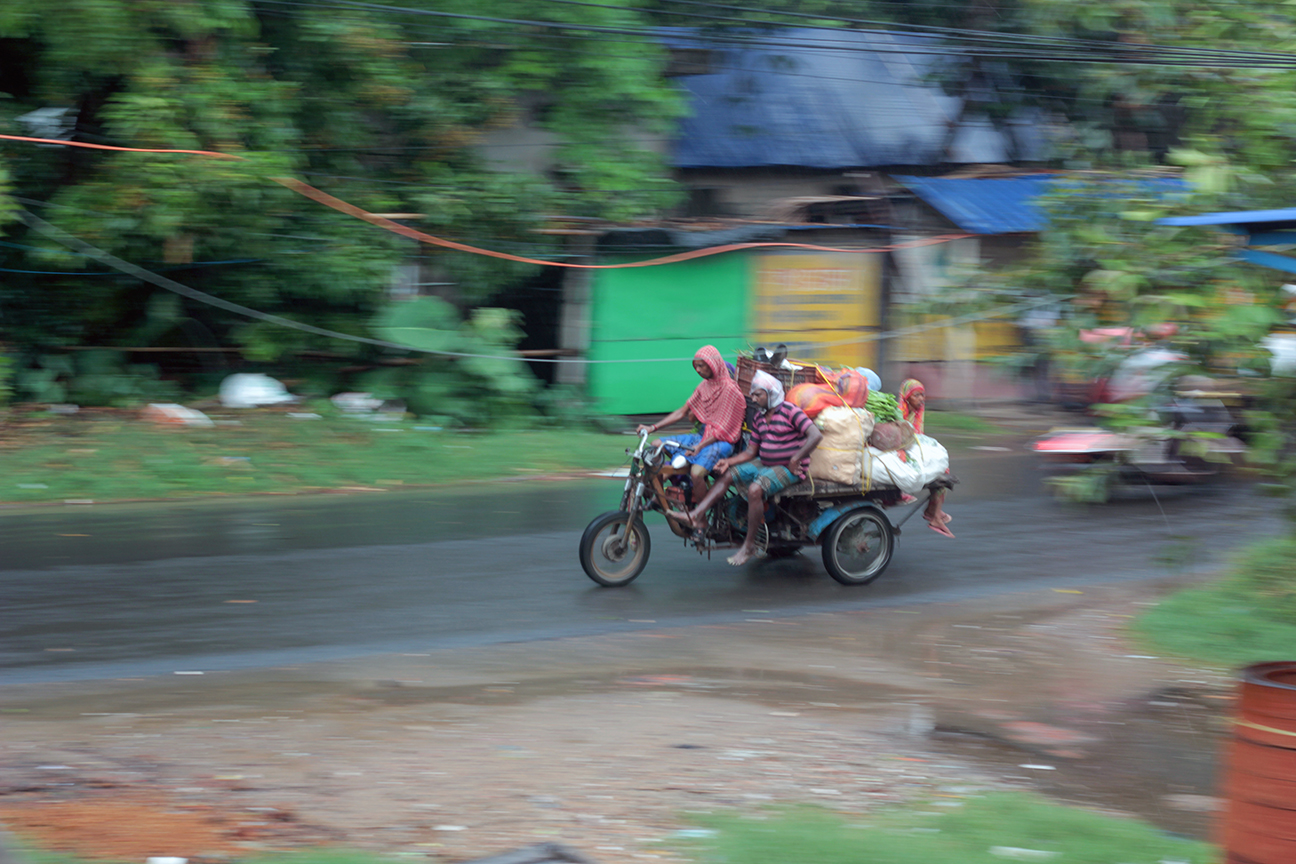
Panning of vegetable seller's alternative transportation in Sonarpur due to COVID-19 pandemic in West Bengal

The COVID-19 pandemic was first confirmed in the Indian state of West Bengal on 17 March 2020 in Kolkata. The Health and Family Welfare department of Government of West Bengal has confirmed a total of 13,43,442 COVID-19 positive cases, including 1,09,806 active cases, 15,120 deaths and 12,18,516 recoveries, as of 28 May 2021.

== Timeline ==
=== February ===
4 February: A Kolkata Airport passenger was kept under hospitalization. Later he was tested negative.

=== March ===
17 March: One male, aged 18 years who had returned from the UK on 15 March, was tested positive.

20 March: One male, aged 22 years who had returned from the UK on 13 March, was tested positive.

21 March: One female, aged 23 years who had returned from Scotland on 19 March, was tested positive.

22 March: One male, aged 57 years who was admitted to a private facility in North Kolkata, was tested positive.

23 March: First COVID-19 death was reported as the 57-year-old male patient expired at the private facility. He was a railway employee and recently came from Bilaspur. Two males (48 years and 20 years) and one female (47 years), who were in direct contacts of a positive case, were tested positive.

24 March: One 58-year-old male, who returned from Egypt and one 55-year-old female, who returned from the UK, were tested positive.

26 March: One male, aged 66 years who was admitted to a private facility in South Kolkata, was tested positive.

27 March: One male (aged 11 years) and four females (aged 27 years, 45 years, 6 years and 9 months), all belonging to a close group of siblings and relatives, were tested positive. They came in contact with a positive case in Delhi who came from the UK on 16 March.

28 March: Two females, aged 76 years and 56 years who both were kept under quarantine for coming in direct contact with one previously COVID-19 positive case, were tested positive. They came in contact with their close relatives who came from the US and Singapore.

29 March: One female of about 44 years who was admitted to a government hospital in Kalimpong on 28 March and had travel history to Thailand and Kerala, was found positive.

30 March: The female of 44 years from Kalimpong district expired at a government hospital in Siliguri. Another female of 48 years, who expired at a government hospital in Howrah with a case of Severe Acute Respiratory Illness, was later found COVID-19 positive.

31 March: One male, who was aged 57 years and had Severe Acute Respiratory Illness, expired at a private facility in Howrah. He was tested positive. Total death count at the end of this month is 4.

=== April ===
1 April: One male, aged 57 years having kidney failure and one male, aged 50 years having high blood pressure and other co-morbid conditions, expired early in the morning. Both of them were reportedly tested positive, which is a subject to confirmation.

=== July ===
15 July: Death toll reaches 1,000.

23 July: Total positive cases cross 50,000

== Testing ==
=== Facilities ===
As of 22 July, the state has 56 laboratories approved by Indian Council of Medical Research for testing. The total number of testing in West Bengal is still lagging in comparison with states with similar economic stature, for example, the state of Rajasthan has conducted more than 5 lakh tests as of 08/06/2020, whereas the state of West Bengal has done around 2.6 lakh tests until this date. To date, West Bengal has the capacity of testing little more than 9000 samples in a day whereas Rajasthan has built the capacity of testing ~12000 samples per day.

- Total Number of government hospitals treating COVID-19: 196
- Total Number of private hospitals treating COVID-19: 7

== Government Activities ==
Districts of West Bengal were classified as red, orange, or green zones, with red zones having the strictest regulations and green zones having the least strict regulations.

14 March: Government on Saturday announced that all schools, colleges and universities in the state will remain closed until 31 March, in the view of evolving situation on the spread of COVID-19.

17 March: State government stepped up its defence with chief minister Mamata Banerjee announcing the closure of educational institutions until 15 April. She said that even ICDS would be closed until 15 April and two kilograms of rice and potatoes would be sent to the children directly so that the meals can be cooked at home.

21 March: The government has mandated a partial work-from-home system for 7.9 crore people who get subsidized rations. The CM promised that government will give free ration to the poor until September.

23 March: West Bengal CM Mamata Banerjee announced Monday that the state government is creating a Rs 200 crore fund to deal with the impact of COVID-19.

24 March: Entire West Bengal was brought under lock down until 31 March.

25 March: West Bengal Government converts Medical College & Hospital, Kolkata, for isolation of people suspected with Coronavirus.

30 March: West Bengal government issues order to authorities of every districts to set up temporary arrangements of shelter and food to migrants and poor.

== Allegations against West Bengal Government ==
Chief Minister of West Bengal Mamata Banerjee and her government was widely criticised of the handling of the coronavirus pandemic and was accused of concealing facts by the opposition and critics. The opposition accused Mamata of playing "appeasement politics" amid the COVID-19 crisis. On 1 April, Banerjee claimed that the West Bengal Government have already traced 54 people who attended the Tablighi Jamaat religious gathering during the COVID-19 Outbreak, and 44 of them are foreigners. Although according to a report by central security agencies, 232 people had attended the Delhi's Tablighi Jamaat event from West Bengal. Of this, 123 are Indian nationals and 109 are foreigners. Sooner she clarified that her government has acted swiftly after the Nizamuddin area was declared as a hotspot where nearly 2,300 people were staying despite the lockdown. She further added that the government has quarantined 177 people, including 108 foreigners, who attended the Tablighi Jamaat congregation at the Nizamuddin Markaz.

The West Bengal Government has been also criticised for not sending enough samples to the National Institute of Cholera and Enteric Diseases (NICED) for testing. West Bengal test numbers saw some rise after talks between government and NICED. According to them, this will be scaled up further in coming days.

The West Bengal Government has also been recommended to ensure transparency, genuine and verifiable data of COVID-19 by the West Bengal Doctors Forum (WBDF), as doctors cannot afford to send wrong signals to the world. The doctors also hit out at the idea of the bureaucratic system to identify the death of COVID-19 patients. Their spokesperson claimed that every doctor is qualified enough and does not need a committee for such certification. On April 25, 2020, The WB Govt admitted that 57 COVID-19 patients died but also said that 39 from comorbidities, after Inter Ministerial Central Team (IMCT) seeks report. The IMCT also pointed out flaws of the Govt in their letter to the Chief Secretary Rajiva Sinha, in which the letter read:

There were a large number of patients in the isolation wards of Chittaranjan National Cancer Institute (CNCI) as well as MR Bangur hospitals awaiting COVID test results for five days or longer. Specifically at CNCI, there were four patients awaiting test result since April 16, 2020, two patients awaiting test result since April 17, 2020, and three since April 18, 2020. Some of the patients have tested negative. It is not clear why the test results should take such a long time and there is a danger of COVID-19 negative patient acquiring the infection in the hospital while awaiting test result

== Leakage Of Covid-19 Test Reports ==
On February 18, 2021, News18 reported that Sourajeet Majumder, an independent security researcher, had discovered that the official Government site of West Bengal Health & Family Welfare Department was leaking over 1 Lakh reports of COVID-19 tests done in the state. These reports contained sensitive information in them like patient's name, age, residence address, address of referring hospital (in some cases) and the exact date and time of testing which according to Sourajeet could be easily accessed by anyone and could contribute significantly to identity scams, cyber blackmail efforts and identity thefts.

Majumder reached out to CERT-In, who acknowledged the breach to Majumder. Sourajeet also claimed that he had reached out to the system coordinator, who manages the West Bengal State Health Department website. However, as per February 18, 2021, the concerned person issued no response.

== Emergency Relief Fund Appeal by the West Bengal Government ==
In the wake of the pandemic situation, the West Bengal Government appealed to contribute in the West Bengal State Emergency Relief Fund and assist the State in prevention and control of COVID-19 situation.

== Non Government Organization Efforts ==
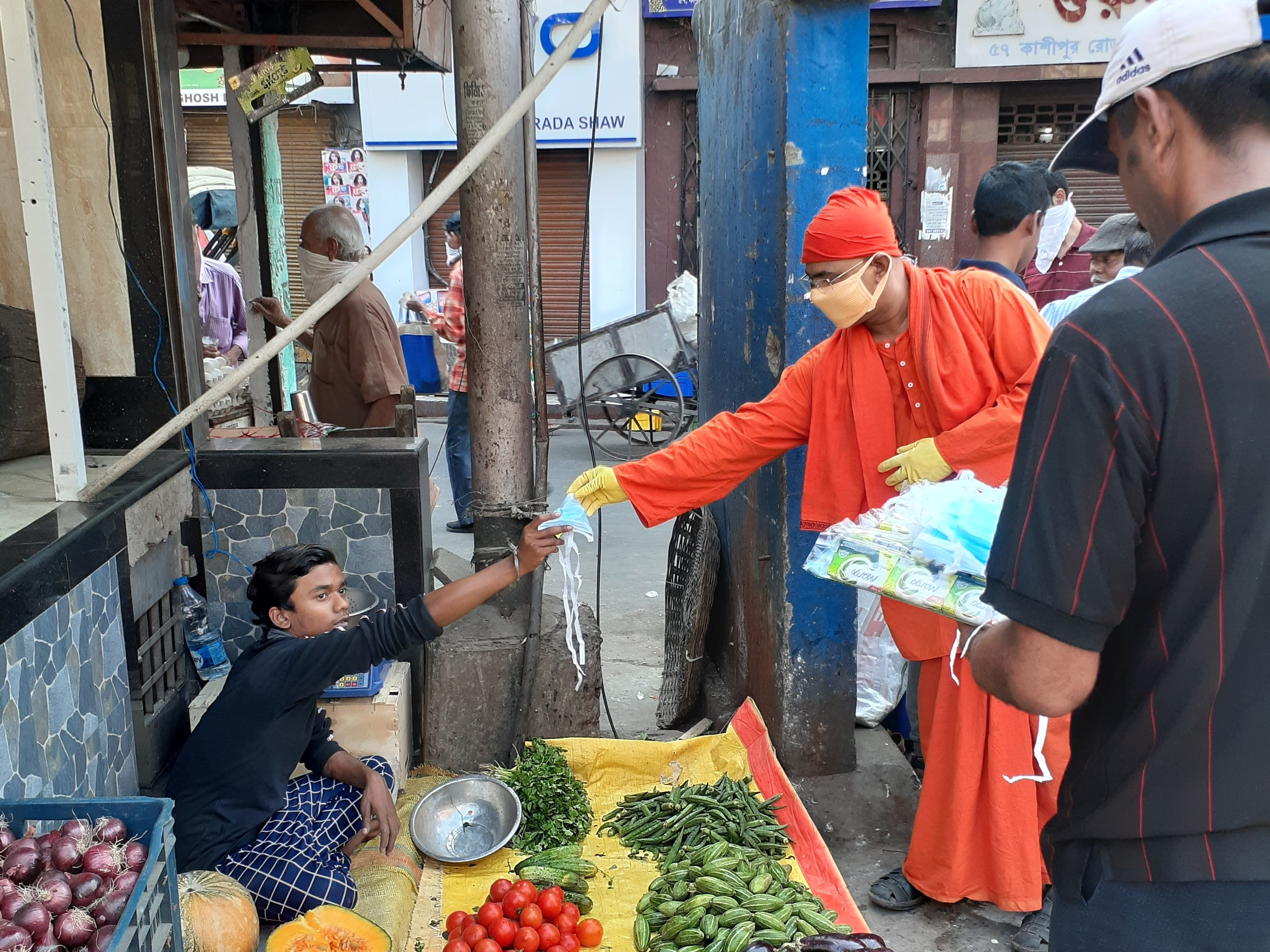
COVID-19 relief services by Baranagar Ramakrishna Mission during second wave of COVID-19 in 2021.

Many Non Government Organizations, Clubs, Religious Organizations, Political Parties, Persons and NRIs take part in COVID-19 Pandemic control besides Government Efforts.

Baranagore Ramakrishna Mission Ashrama High School was continuing the relief services to the families affected by the lockdown due to the COVID-19 pandemic during first wave of COVID-19. Ex-students of this school organised a COVID relief fund and delivered much-needed oxygen, food, and necessary things to COVID-19 affected patients and their families of Baranagar and neighborhood areas of North Kolkata during second wave of COVID-19.

Red Volunteers are providing ground level helps to COVID-19 affected citizens.

West Bengal Doctors Forum, a non-government organization of doctors joined hands with SwitchON to provide free telemedicine services.

In light of increased oxygen demand in second wave of COVID-19, a Kolkata-based non-government organization liver foundation in collaboration with the West Bengal government's health department started a project called 'Oxygen on Wheels' to provide free oxygen to those in need.

Doctors from R.G. Kar Medical College developed People Care Network App to organize COVID-19 related leads and resources to help citizens.

An NGO from West Bengal, working for underprivileged started locating people with COVID-19 Symptoms and providing medical help.

== See also ==
- COVID-19 pandemic in India
- Timeline of the COVID-19 pandemic in India
- COVID-19 pandemic by country and territory
- Misinformation related to the COVID-19 pandemic
- COVID-19 lockdown in India
