= Srijan Bhattacharya =

Indian political activist

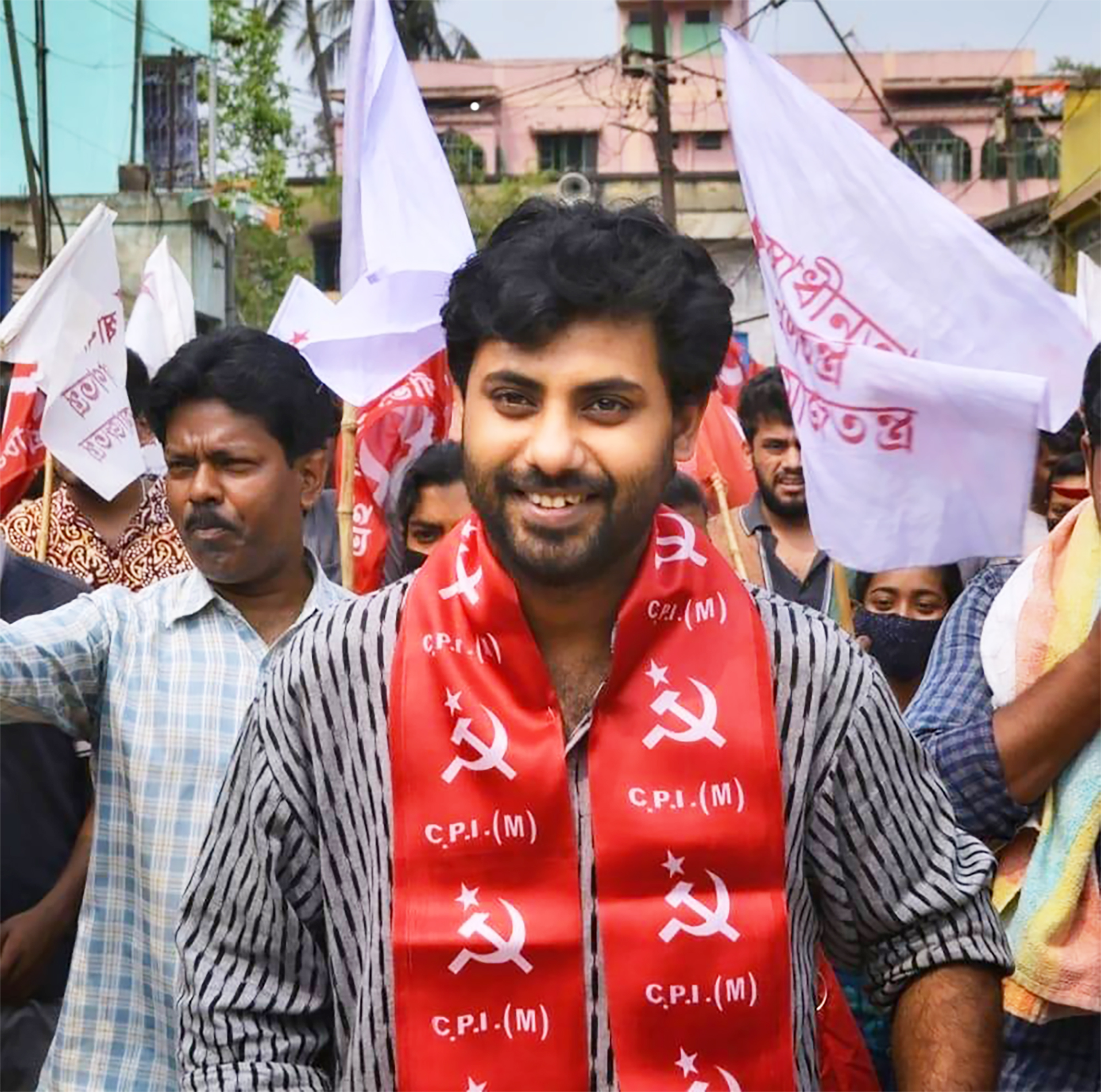

General Secretary of the Students' Federation of India
- Incumbent
- Assumed office 29 June 2025
- Preceded by: Mayukh Biswas

Secretary of the Students' Federation of India, West Bengal State Committee
- In office 18 December 2017 – 24 January 2024
- President: Pratik Ur Rahaman (2017–2024)
- Preceded by: Debajyoti Das
- Succeeded by: Debanjan Dey

Personal details
- Born: 12 May 1993 (age 33) Haltu, South 24 Parganas district, West Bengal, India
- Party: Communist Party of India (Marxist)
- Education: • South Point School • Nava Nalanda High School • Jadavpur University

Srijan Bhattacharyya (born 12 May 1993) is an Indian Marxist student leader and the current General Secretary of the Students’ Federation of India (SFI). Previously served as the SFI's West Bengal state secretary and as the SFI’s national joint secretary. He was Left Front candidate in the 2021 West Bengal Assembly election from Singur, and the 2024 Lok Sabha election from Jadavpur.

== Personal life ==
Srijan Bhattacharya, son of Dr. Arindam Bhattacharya and Lt. Suranjana Bhattacharya, is a leftist political activist coming from Kolkata, West Bengal. He was a student of South Point High School and Nava Nalanda High school. He completed his Bachelor and Masters degrees as a student of History from Jadavpur University (Batch of 2012–2017). Srijan's parents were both leftist student activists, and his grandfather Achintya Bhattacharya was a communist leader of Assam, one of the earliest Indian communists who left the CPI in order to form the CPI(M) during the CPI-CPI(M) split. Besides being a political activist, he has contributed as a songwriter and musician in a musical band called Ebong Koyekjon, who released an album with 9 original compositions in 2014. Apart from this, he has freelanced as a lyricist and composer in quite a few independent musical projects as well. 'পরিত্যক্ত ক্যারাভ্যানের গান' (Melodies of a Deserted Caravan), a book of poems and short stories written by Srijan was published by Shalidhan Prakashan in the International Kolkata Book Fair 2021. He has a lot of articles and poems published in different newspapers, magazines and books. He is passionate about football, and has interests in trekking and travelling.

== Political life ==
Srijan joined the SFI in 2007 as a school student and currently serving as the General Secretary of SFI. And a former State Secretary of SFI West Bengal State Committee (17 December 2017 – present) along with PratikUr Rahaman, the State President of SFI West Bengal State Committee. He was also the All India Joint Secretary of the SFI (2 November 2018 – 30 June 2025). He was elected as Asst. Secretary of the SFI Kolkata District Committee in 2015 and in the same year was elected as a member of the SFI West Bengal State Committee. In 2019, he became a member of the CPI(M) West Bengal State Committee. He was elected as the youngest delegate to participate in the 22nd Party Congress of the CPI(M) that was held at Hyderabad in April 2018.

He contested the West Bengal Legislative Assembly Elections 2021 from the high-profile Assembly Constituency of Singur (A.C. 188) as a candidate of the CPI(M) and lost to Becharam Manna of the AITC, ending up as third with 14.3% of the total vote shares. Srijan is a popular figure of the SFI and the CPI(M) of West Bengal in recent times. During his tenure as a student leader, he has led multiple movements against the TMC government in West Bengal and the BJP Government in Centre.

In 2018, a movement rejecting autocratic student councils and demanding revival of democratically elected student unions across Bengal's higher educational institutions was led by Srijan. In his tenure, SFI gained back student unions in both the prestigious universities of Jadavpur and Presidency after a decade. His role as a student leader in anti-NRC anti-CAA protests during the early 2020s was crucial in organising students throughout the state.

Throughout the Covid Pandemic and Lockdown, SFI under the leadership of PratikUr and Srijan was vocal on students' concerns like Digital Divide, and carried on a successful movement compelling the West Bengal government to reopen educational institutions in January 2022. He has been an active participant in the huge contingent of young Leftist covid volunteers, more popularly known as Red Volunteers.

He has been one of the major organisers in building student-youth movements against corruption in college admissions, recruitment scams of TMC Government and murder of student activist Anish Khan. During his term, SFI in West Bengal has carried on massive demonstrations against the National Education Policy 2020, and other education related issues like fee hikes, campus democracy, transport fares etc. He has acted as one of the brains behind formulating an Alternative Education Policy by SFI, as opposed to the NEP 2020.

== Electoral history ==
=== Lok Sabha ===
2024 Indian general elections: Jadavpur
Party	Candidate	Votes	%	±%
AITC	Saayoni Ghosh	7,17,899	45.83	
BJP	Anirban Ganguly	459,698	29.35	
CPI(M)	Srijan Bhattacharya	258,365	16.49	
Indian Secular Front	Nur Alam Khan	83,362	5.32	
Independent	Ranjit Kumar Mandal	13,030	0.83	
Independent	Hosen Gazi	4,927	0.31	
BSP	Sandip Nath	4,462	0.28	
SUCI(C)	Kalpana Naskar Datta	4,451	0.28	
Independent	Balaram Mandal	2,835	0.18	
Independent	Tanushree Mondal	2,427	0.15	
Independent	Shankar Mandal	1,442	0.09	
Mulnibasi Party of India	Sri Gopan Sardar	1,373	0.08	
Independent	Purnima Debnath	1,325	0.08	
Independent	Chandrachur Goswami	1,114	0.08	
Independent	Arun Sarkar	1,110	0.07	
Independent	Dipak Sardar	927	0.05	
None of the Above	None of the Above	7,415	0.47	
Majority		258,201	16.48	
Turnout		15,66,162	77.53	

== See also ==
- Communist Party of India (Marxist), West Bengal
