= Ashok Mitra =

Indian economist and Marxist politician

The Honourable Ashok Mitra MP

Member of Parliament, Rajya Sabha for West Bengal
- In office 19 August 1993 – 18 August 1999

Chief Economic Adviser to the Government of India
- In office 1970–1972
- Preceded by: VK Ramaswamy
- Succeeded by: Manmohan Singh

Finance Minister of West Bengal
- In office 1977–1987
- Preceded by: Shankar Ghosh
- Succeeded by: Asim Dasgupta

Member of West Bengal Legislative Assembly
- In office 1983–1987
- Preceded by: Dinesh Majumdar
- Succeeded by: Buddhadeb Bhattacharjee
- Constituency: Jadavpur
- In office 1977–1982
- Preceded by: Lakshmi Kanta Bose
- Succeeded by: Hoimi Basu
- Constituency: Rashbehari Avenue

Personal details
- Born: 10 April 1928 Dacca, East Bengal, British Raj
- Died: 1 May 2018 (aged 90) Kolkata, West Bengal, India
- Citizenship: Indian
- Education: University of Dacca; Banaras Hindu University; Delhi School of Economics; Erasmus University Rotterdam
- Awards: Sahitya Akademi Award (1996)

Ashok Mitra (10 April 1928 – 1 May 2018) was an Indian economist and Marxist politician. He was a chief economic adviser to the Government of India and later became finance minister of West Bengal and a member of the Rajya Sabha.

== Early life and education ==
After completing his graduation from the University of Dacca, he came to India following the partition of India in 1947. Although he attended postgraduate classes in economics at the University of Calcutta, he was refused admission there. He moved to Banaras Hindu University where he earned an M.A. in economics. He joined the newly established Delhi School of Economics in the early 1950s. Later, he attended the Institute of Social Studies in the Netherlands. Under the guidance of Professor Jan Tinbergen of the Erasmus University Rotterdam, he was awarded a doctorate in economics there in 1953.

== Career ==
=== Academic ===
Mitra taught as a lecturer in economics at the University of Lucknow for two years before proceeding to the Netherlands to complete his PhD thesis. He taught at the UN Economic Commission for Asia and the Far East in Bangkok, Thailand, before returning to Delhi in 1961. He joined the Economic Development Institute in Washington, D.C., as a faculty of economics during the early 1960s. He also worked for the World Bank in the 1960s. In the early-1990s he became the chairman of the Centre for Studies in Social Sciences, Calcutta.

=== Political ===
After returning to India he accepted the professorship in economics at the newly established Indian Institute of Management Calcutta. He was the chief economic adviser and later chairman of the Agricultural Prices Commission, both of the Government of India. He was finance minister of West Bengal from 1977–87. In the mid-1990s he became a member of the Rajya Sabha and was chairman of the Parliament's Standing Committee on Industry and Commerce.

== Scholarship ==
He authored the "Calcutta Diary" in Economic and Political Weekly and "Terms of Trade and Class Relations". He contributed articles regularly to the Calcutta-based national daily newspaper, The Telegraph. He also wrote short stories in Bengali. He was conferred the Sahitya Academi Award in 1996 for his Essays entitled Tal Betal. His publications include China-Issues in Development and From the Ramparts, Prattler's Tale: Recollections of a Contrary Marxist (which has also been published in Bengali as Apila Chapala).

He founded a journal entitled Arek Rakam.

== Death and family ==
Mitra was married to Gouri, who died aged 79 in May 2008. He died on 1 May 2018 at the age of 90. Ashok Mitra is survived by his only sibling, Sreelata Ghosh (née Mitra), sister.
