= Rajeev Kumar Singh =

Rajeev Kumar Singh may refer to

- Rajeev Kumar Singh Kushwaha
- Rajeev Kumar Singh (Dataganj politician)
- Rajeev Kumar Singh (Dariyabad politician), (1952–2022)
- Rajiv Kumar (civil servant)
