= Shyamali Gupta =

Indian politician

Shyamali Gupta (1 June 1945 − 25 November 2013) was an Indian politician and Central Committee member of the Communist Party of India (Marxist). She was former general secretary of its women's wing, the All India Democratic Women's Association (AIDWA).
