= Manish Gupta (politician) =

Indian politician (born 1941)

Manish Gupta IAS (Retd.)
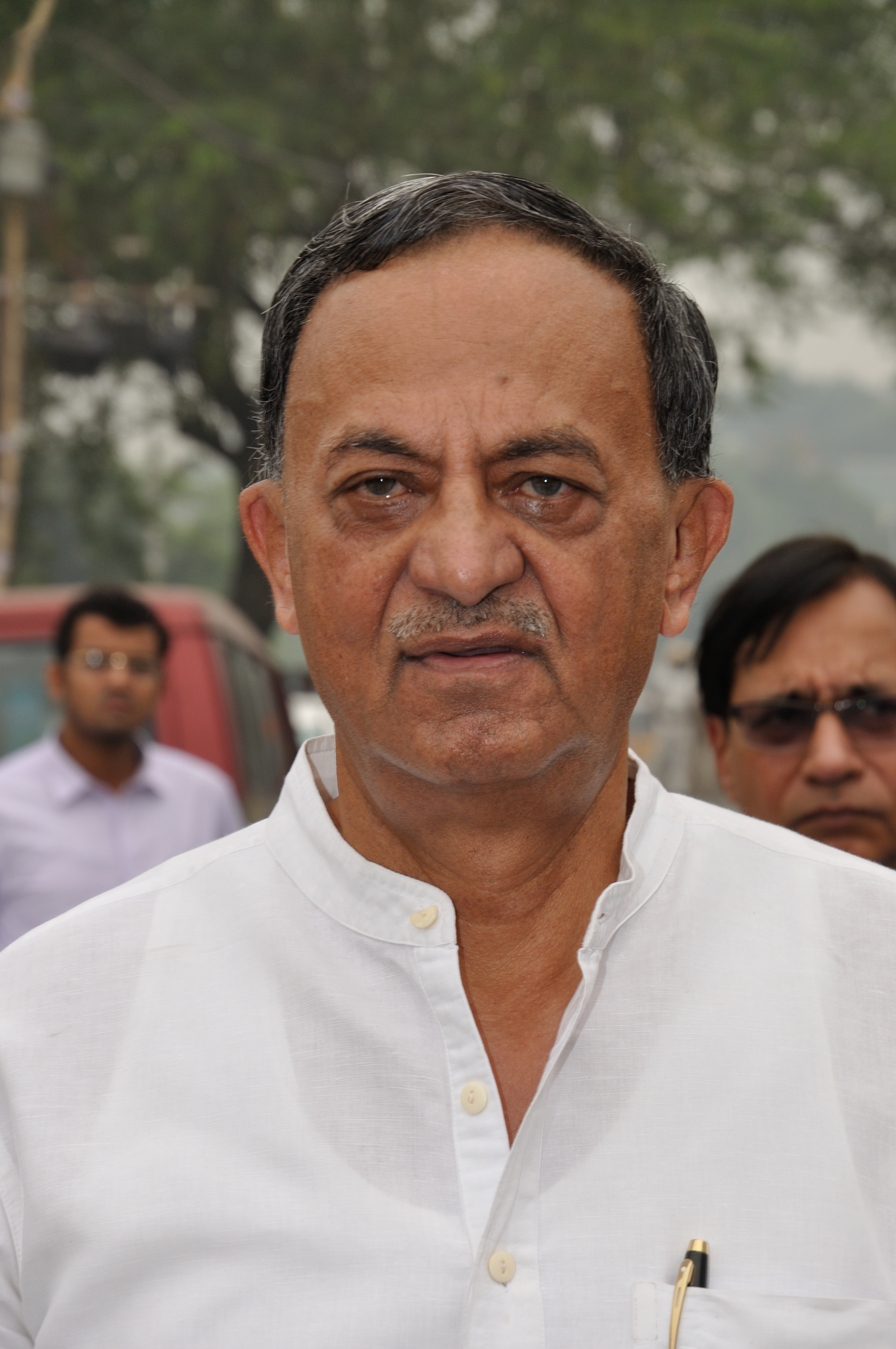
- Gupta in 2015

Member of Parliament, Rajya Sabha
- In office 14 March 2017 – 3 March 2020
- Preceded by: Mithun Chakraborty
- Succeeded by: Subrata Bakshi
- Constituency: West Bengal

Cabinet Minister, Government of West Bengal
- In office 21 May 2011 – 21 November 2012
- Chief Minister: Mamata Banerjee
- Department: Urban Development & Planning
- Preceded by: Buddhadeb Bhattacharjee
- Succeeded by: Rachhpal Singh
- In office 21 November 2012 – 19 May 2016
- Chief Minister: Mamata Banerjee
- Department: Power & Electrical Engineering
- Preceded by: Mrinal Banerjee
- Succeeded by: Sovandeb Chattopadhyay
- Constituency: Jadavpur

Member of West Bengal Legislative Assembly
- In office 13 May 2011 – 19 May 2016
- Preceded by: Buddhadeb Bhattacharjee
- Succeeded by: Dr. Sujan Chakraborty
- Constituency: Jadavpur

Chief Secretary, Government of West Bengal
- In office 1997–2001
- Born: 11 November 1941 (age 84)
- Education: University of Calcutta (B.Sc.)
- Political party: Trinamool Congress

Manish Gupta (born 11 November 1941) is an Indian politician who was the Minister for Power in the Government of West Bengal. He was a member of the West Bengal Legislative Assembly. In the 2011 Vidhan Sabha election of West Bengal he historically defeated his former boss- the then incumbent Chief Minister of West Bengal, Buddhadeb Bhattacharjee, who remained the MLA of this constituency for twenty-four years by a huge margin of 16,684 votes. He served under Buddhadeb Bhattacharjee as the Chief Secretary of West Bengal before he retired as an IAS officer. He also worked as the Chief Secretary of West Bengal under Chief Minister Jyoti Basu - a time when Buddhadeb Bhattacharjee was the Deputy Chief Minister.

On 10 March 2017, Manish Gupta was elected unopposed to the Rajya Sabha, after the seat had fallen vacant after the resignation of Mithun Chakraborty.
