= Rajeev Kumar (Indian politician) =

Indian police officer (born 1956)

Rajeev Kumar PPM IPS
- Born: July 30, 1956 (age 70)
- Education: University of Allahabad
- Police career
- Country: India
- Department: Police
- Service years: 1981–2016
- Rank: DGP
- Awards: PPM for Meritorious Services 1997; PPM for Distinguished services in 2014; Internal Security Medal in 2014; Police Medal (50th year of Independence) in 1997

Rajeev Kumar is a former Director General of Police of the state of Jharkhand. He held highly responsible positions during his career. He is a 1981 batch IPS officer. He was appointed as the DGP Jharkhand in the year 2013 and served for two years till February 2015. In the year 1997, he was awarded the President's Police Medal for Meritorious services and in the year 2014, he was also awarded the President's Police Medal for Distinguished services.

== Early life and education ==
Rajeev Kumar was born in Lucknow to Anant Ram and Sheela Rani. His father was a well known IAS officer as well as a freedom fighter. Kumar completed his graduation in the year 1975 from the Allahabad University. He joined the Indian Revenue Service (IRS) in the year 1979 and served for two years. As his temperament suited a police job, he switched to IPS.

== Career ==
Kumar joined IPS in 1981 and served for the country for 35 years. As an IPS officer he held the following charges in various capacities as : Superintendent of Police in Sahibganj, Hazaribagh, Purnia, Gaya, Darbhanga and Araria districts. Senior Superintendent of Police in Ranchi district. Superintendent Railway Police in Jamalpur. Superintendent of Police (C) in Criminal Investigation Department (CID), Bihar. Superintendent of Police (B) in Special Branch, Bihar. Commandant in Central Industrial Security Force (CISF). Deputy Inspector General of Police in CISF. Deputy Inspector General in Palamu Range, Jharkhand. Zonal Inspector General of Police (IG) in Ranchi and Bokaro Zones. Additional Director General in Special Branch, Jharkhand. Chief Vigilance Officer in EPFO, New Delhi. DGP of Jharkhand State. Chairman, Jharkhand Police Housing Corporation. DG – Homeguard and Fire Services, Jharkhand. He has held critical positions in the Police Department in various capacities having multifarious responsibilities.

== Achievements ==
In the year 2015, he released a movie, "PRATYAVARTAN - The Home Coming". Kumar was the only police officer of Jharkhand who made a full feature film highlighting the flawed Naxal ideology and the atrocities perpetrated by them and exhorting them to shun the path of violence and come back to the mainstream. The movie received critical acclaim for its remarkable exposition of perverted philosophy followed by the naxals. He commanded a force of 80,000 police personnel leading the State Police to unprecedented successes. The Lok Sabha & Vidhan Sabha Elections which were held in Jharkhand in 2014 were incident free, in spite of the looming Maoist threat & recorded a historic voter turnout. The State witnessed a considerable decline in naxal violence due to proactive operations during his period as the chief. Law and Order situation improved drastically. As a welfare measure for the constables, Kumar started Police Canteens in several districts of Jharkhand. A novel initiative, ‘DGP AapkeDwar’ was conceptualised wherein direct video conferencing was held by reaching out to the people having grievances relating to passport verification, character verification, crime against women and interacting with various District Chambers of Commerce to get a first-hand account of the problems of different sections of society and ensuring their prompt redressal. Kumar had applied for central deputation wherein, he was posted as Chief Vigilance Officer (CVO) in EPFO in the year 2009 to 2012, where a large scale systemic changes were affected by way of Rationalising & redesigning the reporting pattern within the Vigilance set up. Redesigning the Performa of Inspection Report, making it more transparent and elaborate. He organised regular surprise inspections of field offices identified for corrupt practices. Several cases involving PF evasion of hundreds of Crores were forwarded to CBI for causing investigation into the culpability / connivance of EPFO officers and employers. A large number of Departmental Proceedings, both for Major penalty & Minor penalty, were initiated which culminated in imposing appropriate penalty by the Disciplinary Authority.
