= All India Democratic Women's Association =

Indian women's organisation

All India Democratic Women's Association (AIDWA)
- Formation: 1981
- Type: Women's organisation
- Legal status: Active
- Headquarters: New Delhi, India
- General secretary: Mariam Dhawale
- President: P.K. Sreemathy
- Website: aidwaonline.org

All India Democratic Women's Association (AIDWA) is a women's organisation committed to achieving democracy, equality and women's emancipation. It has an organisational presence in 23 states in India, with a current membership of more than 11 million. About two-thirds of the organisation's strength is derived from poor rural and urban women. It was founded in 1981 as a national level mass organisation of women. Since its inception, the organisation has fought for women's equal rights to food, work, health, a safe environment, and education

== History ==
Pappa Umanath founded the Democratic Women's Association in Tamil Nadu in 1973, working for women's rights and for their education, employment and status, along with issues like casteism, communalism, child rights and disaster aid. Several other affiliated State-based organisations developed, and the unified All India Democratic Women's Association (AIDWA) was established in 1981.

AIDWA has an annual membership fee of one rupee, which allows it policy-independence from donor agencies and government. In 2007, it had over 10 million members, spread across 23 states.

== Activities ==
=== 2002 campaign against Hindustan Lever advertising ===
Subtle cultural norms can be easily transgressed. In 2002, widespread protests forced Hindustan Unilever Limited (the Indian subsidiary of London-based Unilever) to cancel a television ad campaign for its fairness cream because of its portrayal of women. The campaign was built around the theme of a father lamenting "If only I had a son" while showing his problem: a dark-skinned, unattractive daughter. She uses the Fair & Lovely skin whitening cream and becomes a light-skinned, successful, attractive woman. AIDWA lodged a complaint with the National Human Rights Commission in New Delhi. It argued endorsing the traditional preference for sons strengthens gender discrimination, which is a major problem in India. Furthermore, said AIDWA, the ad perpetuated a culture of discrimination in a society where "fair skin" is synonymous with "beautiful." The government's Ministry of Information and Broadcast sided with AIDWA and directed stations not to air the ads because they violated the Cable and Television Networks Act of 1995 which states that no advertisement shall be permitted which "derides any race, caste, color, creed and nationality" and furthermore states that, "Women must not be portrayed in a manner that emphasizes passive, submissive qualities and encourages them to play a subordinate secondary role in the family and society." The minister told Parliament that if broadcasters do not regulate ad content the government will be forced to do so. The Mumbai-based Advertising Standards Council of India (ASCI), a body of advertisers and media agencies, insisted that it should do the regulating not the government. ASCI had already told Hindustan Lever that its ad campaign was offensive and it was ended.

=== "India's Daughter" Ban ===
BBC 4 produced a documentary titled "India's Daughter" in 2015, focusing on the 2012 Delhi gang rape case, during which 22-year old Jyoti Singh, an Indian medical student was raped and murdered. The Indian government opted to ban the documentary. Activists from AIDWA strongly opposed the ban, releasing a press release that "this is a knee jerk reaction that constitutes an attack on the freedom of expression. Furthermore, the film reveals the reality of the brutality of rape without sensationalizing it." Contesting the ban, the Hyderabad office of AIDWA held a screening of the film for its members in the city.

=== Women's Reservation Bill (2011) ===
Activists from AIDWA advocated for the passing of the Women's Reservation Bill near parliament house in 2011. As of 2021, India ranked 148th out of 193 based on the percentage of elected women representatives in their national parliaments. Studies have agreed that a lack of political participation by women has an impact on policy making. The Bill, in its final version, was introduced in 2023 during a special session of Parliament and signed by President Droupadi Murmu.

=== BJP-RSS Rally (2023) ===
AIDWA organized a rally in October 2023 protesting the worsening socio-economic conditions under the government of Prime Minister Narendra Modi. The event was held under the banner, "BJP-RSS Hatao, Mahila Bachao, Desh Bachao!" or, translated to English, "Remove BJP-RSS, Save women, Save the country!". The slogan echoes Indira Gandhi's 1971 slogan "Garibi Hatao, Desh Bachao" or, translated to English, "Abolish Poverty, Rescue the Country".

=== Marital Rape Exception in India (2024) ===
India's government, in October 2024, formally opposed a call to criminalize marital rape. The government, under Prime Minister Modi, told its Supreme court that criminalizing marital rape would be "excessively harsh". Section 375 of the Indian Penal Code, in existence since 1860, exempts men from charges of rape against their wives unless the woman in question is a minor. Rape within a marriage is a crime in over 100 countries; however India, along with Afghanistan and Saudi Arabia, is one of the nations where it is not illegal. Various human rights organisations, including AIDWA, had been petitioning the Supreme Court to make it a criminal offence.

Mariam Dhawale, generale secretary of AIDWA, called the legal system "exploitative and unjust" toward Indian women, stating that "Women are just appendages - appendages of the father, then the husband, then the son." She further stated that sexual violence is normalized in India.

According to the National Crime Records Bureau in 2022, a rape is reported in India every 16 minutes. However, official data is scarce, and most activists estimate only a tiny fraction of women who experience sexual violence lodge an official complaint.

== National Conference of AIDWA ==
The first National Conference of AIDWA was held at Chennai in 1981, with delegates from 12 states representing 590,000 members. The eighth National Conference was held at Kolkata in 2007, with 951 delegates from 23 states, representing a membership of around 18,600,000. Former West Bengal Chief Minister Jyoti Basu addressed the inaugural session. The 9th National Conference of AIDWA, held at Moti Jheel, Kanpur from 9 to 12 November 2010, was the first conference to be held in the Northern Hindi belt. 753 delegates from 22 states and 20 special invitees took part in the four-day conference. Amidst slogans pledging to carry forward the struggle for women's equality and emancipation, legendary freedom fighter Capt. Lakshmi Sehgal, living symbol of women's fight against imperialism and emancipation, unfurled the AIDWA flag. Floral tributes were paid to martyrs who have laid down their lives in the struggle for equality, democracy and emancipation.

=== 10th National Conference ===
AIDWA's 10th National Conference was held in Bodh Gaya, Bihar, from 22 to 25 November 2013. It started with flag hoisting by AIDWA's national president Shyamali Gupta and homage to martyrs who sacrificed their lives for women's emancipation and social justice. The inaugural session featured a special session titled "Women against Violence: Fighting for Justice, Resisting Violence, Claiming Rights", wherein women from across the country who have been fighting the battle against violence, discrimination and social injustice in various forms which includes domestic and political violence, sexual assault, fight for land rights, fight against caste and communal discrimination and against terrorism spoke. The women who spoke included representative of the Vachathi tribal mass rape survivor from Tamil Nadu, Parandhayi, who stood up against her sexual assault by forest and police officials for 19 years and finally succeeded in getting justice.

=== 13th All India Conference ===
The 13th All India Conference of AIDWA was held in Thiruvananthapuram, Kerala, from 6–9 January 2023. 850 delegates from 25 states and territories participated. Special invitees included Teesta Setalvad, a civil rights activist and journalist, and Madhura Swaminathan, Head of the Economic Analysis Unit at the Indian Statistical Institute in Bangalore, chair of the M. S. Swaminathan Research Foundation, and member of the Council of Advisors for the World Food Prize Foundation.

== Office bearers ==
- President– P.K. Shreemathy
- General Secretary– Kaninika Ghosh Bose
- Treasurer- Tapasi Praharaj

== See also ==
- Krantikari Adivasi Mahila Sangathan
- Mahila Atma Raksha Samiti
- National Federation of Indian Women
