= Melarmath, Agartala =

Coordinates: 23°49′47″N 91°16′26″E

Melarmath is a locality in Agartala, Tripura, India.
