= Tribal Youth Federation =

- Upajati Juba Federation
- Abbreviation: TYF
- Formation: 1967
- Founded at: Jirania
- Type: Youth wing
- Legal status: Active
- Headquarters: Chhatra-Juva bhawan, Melarmath, Agartala
- Region served: India
- General Secretary: Kumudh Debbarma
- President: Kaushik Roy Debbarma
- Parent organization: Ganamukti Parishad
- Affiliations: Democratic Youth Federation of India

Tribal Youth Federation (in Bengali Upajati Juba Federation) is an organization affiliated to Democratic Youth Federation of India in Tripura. TYF organizes youth from the tribal populations of the state. TYF has a separate central committee and publishes Bini Kharad (Our Voice). The supreme body of TYF is the Central Conference.

TYF works in close coordination with Ganamukti Parishad and is often considered as the youth wing of GMP.

TYF was founded in 1967 to counter the influence of Tripura Upajati Juba Samiti.

== Activities ==
- 14 September 2014: TYF rejected IPFT's Demand separate state in a press conference.
- 13 August 2019: TYF organised a convention with 10 point demand in agartala Town Hall.
- 17 September 2019: Tribal Youth Federation demanding jobs for youth unemployment and address a massive rally in Tripura.
- 17 January 2020: Tribal Youth Federation (TYF) demand immediate release of former minister Badal Chowdhury.

== See also ==
- Democratic Youth Federation of India
- Ganamukti Parishad
- Communist Party of India (Marxist)
