= Students' Federation of India =

Leftist student organisation in India

- President: Adarsh M. Saji
- General Secretary: Srijan Bhattacharyya
- Founded: 30 December 1970; 55 years ago
- Headquarters: H K S Surjeet Bhawan 10 - 12, Indrajit Gupta Marg, Rouse Avenue, Mandi House, New Delhi, Delhi — 110002, India
- Membership: ▲4,300,405
- Ideology: Scientific socialism Anti-imperialism; Anti-colonialism
- Website: http://sficec.in/

The Students' Federation of India (SFI) is a left-wing student organisation in India. It is affiliated to the Communist Party of India (Marxist).

== History of the organisation ==
The organised Indian student movement traces to the founding of the All India Students' Federation (AISF) on 12 August 1936 in Lucknow. Following the Sino-Indian War of 1962, disputes over Marxist theory and Cold War alignment split the Communist Party of India in 1964, producing a breakaway Communist Party of India (Marxist). This party split carried directly into AISF, and student leaders who aligned with CPI(M) in the late 1960s began organising separate independent regional bodies. In 1970, delegates from ten such regional federations met in Thiruvananthapuram from 27 to 30 December and founded the Students' Federation of India as CPI(M)'s national student wing.

Former national office bearers
No.	Year	Place of conference	President	General secretary
1	1970	Thiruvananthapuram	C. Bhaskaran	Biman Bose
2	1973	Delhi (CEC Meeting)	Prakash Karat	Biman Bose
3	1974	Kolkata	Prakash Karat	Biman Bose
4	1976	Kolkata (CEC Meeting)	Prakash Karat	Subhas Chakraborty
5	1978	Patna	M. A. Baby	Nepaldev Bhattacharya
6	1981	Mumbai	M. A. Baby	Nepaldev Bhattacharya
7	1984	Dum Dum	Sitaram Yechury	Nepaldev Bhattacharya
8	1986	Vijayawada	A. Vijayaraghavan	Nilotpal Basu
9	1989	Kolkata	A. Vijayaraghavan	Nilotpal Basu
10	1993	Thiruvananthapuram	Y. B. Rao	Sujan Chakraborty
11	1997	Midnapore	K. N. Balagopal	Bratin Sengupta
12	2000	Chennai	P. Krishna Prasad	Samik Lahiri
13	2003	Kozhikode	K. K. Ragesh	Kallol Roy
14	2005	Hyderabad	R. Arun Kumar	K. K. Ragesh
15	2008	Bidhannagar	P. K. Biju	Ritabrata Banerjee
16	2012	Madurai	V. Sivadasan	Ritabrata Banerjee
17	2016	Sikar	V. P. Sanu	Vikram Singh
18	2018	Shimla	V. P. Sanu	Mayukh Biswas
19	2022	Hyderabad	V. P. Sanu	Mayukh Biswas
20	2025	Kozhikode	Adarsh M. Saji	Srijan Bhattacharya

== Presence and structure ==
The Students' Federation of India in 2024–25 has 24 functioning state committees. It started its first international unit in the United Kingdom in 2022. They are a major student force in Kerala and West Bengal. Currently, they also hold student unions in various universities across India, including Hyderabad Central University and Pondicherry University.

== SFI Central Executive Committee ==
SFI's 18th All India Conference was held from 27 June to 30 June 2025 at Kozhikode, Kerala. The Conference was Organized at Palestine Solidarity Nagar and Sitaram Yechury - Nepaldeb Bhattacharya Manch.

== Activism ==
=== Protest and demands ===
SFI has protested against the National Education Policy, 2019, hike in fees, and under-representation of reserved students in IITs.

SFI members took part and organised multiple Citizenship Amendment Act protests in 2019. The SFI marched to the Parliament in one such protest. Further, the SFI even approached the Supreme Court against the act.

During the COVID-19 lockdown in India, SFI distributed sanitary napkins to female students in West Bengal and demanded their inclusion in essential commodities in Himachal Pradesh. SFI set up COVID-19 helpline numbers in various states to help stranded students. To combat misinformation and reach out to the migrant labourers in various places, SFI launched a campaign named "My dear friend" where verified information from government sources are translated into various Indian languages and circulated through social media. Online art festivals, lecture series and online classes were also organised by various SFI committee's. SFI also produced face masks and hand sanitisers.

SFI had won court cases for regulating private coaching centres in India. They also had movements against the delay in fellowships and scholarships for university students.

SFI and DYFI activists jointly posted 1.5 lakh (150,000) letters to the Prime Minister's office after a first information report (FIR) for sedition was lodged against 49 celebrities who condemned lynchings of Muslims, Dalits, and other minorities in India.

SFI approached Supreme Court seeking directions to provide universal free vaccination to all citizens of India and to waive off the goods and service tax levied on the import of the oxygen concentrators used for personal use during the COVID-19 pandemic.

=== Red Volunteers and other social works ===
SFI along with DYFI, the youth wing of Communist Party of India (Marxist), runs Red Volunteers, Sramajibi Canteen and involves in various social works.

=== Women in SFI ===
From 27 to 29 January 2017, the 5th All India Girls Convention was held at Vijayawada, Andhra Pradesh and it elected a 23-member team of girls’ sub-committee.

==== Bleed Without Fear, Bleed Without Tax ====
Protesting against the imposition of 12% tax on sanitary napkins, the women sub-committee of SFI protested nationwide in July 2017. The campaign was named "Bleed Without Fear, Bleed Without Tax". Petitions were submitted to the Union Finance Minister Arun Jaitley for revoking the government decision. Thousands of girl students mailed sanitary napkins with protest slogans to Arun Jaitley's office. This campaign was similar to that of the Pink Chaddi Campaign in 2009. The campaign also demanded the installation of adequate sanitary napkin vending machines in schools and colleges and providing six packets of sanitary napkins for one rupee to the women below poverty line.

==== All-women panels ====
Female candidates of the SFI won all seats in a mixed college by fielding an all-women panel for students union elections in Sree Sankaracharya University of Sanskrit, Kalady in 2017. An SFI member became the first Dalit woman to be elected as the chairperson in Maharaja's College, Kochi in 2017.

In 2018, all-women SFI panels won in CMS College Kottayam and contested in Government Victoria College, Palakkad.

In 2019, SFI members were elected as the first female chairpersons in Sacred Heart College, Kochi, Kochi, and the College of Engineering, Trivandrum (CET). Earlier, the SFI had organised protests of the female hostelites of CET in February 2019 for extending the curfew timings for girls' hostels. This movement forced the government to accept the demands and Dr Usha Titus, the Higher Education Secretary of the Kerala Government issued orders to enforce them.

==== GSCASH ====
The idea of GSCASH (Gender Sensitisation Committee Against Sexual Harassment) was first experimented in Jawaharlal Nehru University by SFI's students union headed by Vijoo Krishnan in 1998–99. In September 2013, after the harassment of two women students of Pondicherry University, the SFI initiated a movement for GSCASH in the university and the activists approached Madras High Court for redressal. The movement later ended successfully with the High Court ordering university to constitute institutional mechanisms for grievances. In Assam, the Directorate of Higher Education (DHE) in 2018 ordered all colleges to set up GSCASH after the SFI's intervention.

=== LGBTQIA+ issues ===
SFI has actively supported LGBTQIA+ rights. SFI was the first student organization in India to nominate an openly gay person for a Student Union election as they nominated Gourab Ghosh for Jawaharlal Nehru University Student Union elections held in 2013 as its candidate for the General Secretary position. SFI has campaigned for LGBTQIA+ rights in college campuses, and has held conventions. In 2016, SFI decided to include the ‘others’ gender option in its membership forms. SFI has supported the scrapping of section 377 and opposes the Transgender Persons Act, 2019 commenting that the Act "infringes on the rights and dignity of transpersons". Prominent LGBTQIA+ persons in SFI include Apratim Roy (first trans SFI West Bengal State committee member), Nandhana (first Transgender member of Thrissur District committee, Kerala), Adam Harry (first trans man to become a pilot in India), Muhammed Zuhrabi (queer activist, ex-General Secretary, Pondicherry University Students' Council).

=== Hindu-symbolism disputes ===
In July 2025, Kerala's Governor displayed a portrait of Bharat Mata at an official university function, SFI treated this as a political overreach by the Governor into his role as a university Chancellor. SFI activists swarmed the Senate hall demanding the portrait's removal, threatening to block the Governor if it stayed, and the stand-off resulted in a clash with the organizers. The Kerala High Court later weighed in on the issue, with a judge questioning "How Bharat Mata could be classified as a religious symbol?"

=== Beef festival 2026 ===
In february 2026, the SFI organized 'beef festival' protests on Kerala college campuses against the film The Kerala Story 2: Goes Beyond, whose trailer depicts a character being force-fed beef. The Muslim Students Federation (MSF), the student wing of the Indian Union Muslim League (IUML), while itself calling for a boycott of the film, objected to the SFI's protest format calling it "provocative". MSF state general secretary C.K. Najaf said the beef festivals risked hurting the sentiments of Hindus who abstain from beef for religious reasons and are not affiliated with the RSS. He said that forcing beef consumption on others was as much a rights violation as banning it. The IUML also criticised the protest calling it a "cheap political gimmick" intended to attract Muslim voters ahead of Kerala state elections.

=== Violence ===
There have been cases of SFI cadres booked for anti-social activities in Thiruvananthapuram city. In 2017, T Vijayalakshmi, the Director-in-Charge of Students Services of Kerala University, went on indefinite leave, citing death threats received from SFI affiliated students. In 2019, retired judge PK Shamsudin conducted an informal personal probe in college campus politics; Shamsudin claimed anti-democratic activities of SFI in University College, Thiruvananthapuram and claimed presence of "torture rooms" run by SFI. That same year, SFI College Unit members were arrested for stabbing a student at University College. In 2022, videos of the office of an MP from Wayanad Rahul Gandhi being vandalised by SFI members were circulated on social media. The incident was condemned by Kerala Chief Minister Pinarayi Vijayan. In 2022, SFI activists were booked for assault on woman at Government Law College, Thiruvananthapuram. In 2023, SFI activists barged into the Asianet News media office in Ernakulam. The activists pushed aside the security guard and displayed banners against the news outlet. I

In 2023, SFI organised Pro-Palestine rallies across the country after 7 October attack by Hamas on Israel. At the Hyderabad rally, at least eight students were booked by the police for their involvement in a clash with right-wing students. At a similar protest outside Israel embassy in Delhi ended with SFI, AISA and allied groups detained by Delhi Police.

== See also ==
- Tribal Students Union
- Democratic Youth Federation of India
- Tribal Youth Federation
- All India Democratic Women's Association
- Communist Party of India (Marxist)
- All India Kisan Sabha (36 Canning Lane)
- Centre of Indian Trade Unions
