= Democratic Youth Federation of India =

Indian political organization

Democratic Youth Federation of India DYFI
- Abbreviation: DYFI
- Formation: 3 November 1980; 46 years ago
- Type: Youth Organisation
- Legal status: Federation
- Purpose: Build a broad based strong and united youth movement in India, embracing every young man and woman who is pledged to fight for the upliftment and betterment of our youth as a whole.
- Headquarters: Shaheed Bhagat Singh Bhavan,Daryaganj, Delhi- 110002,India
- Members: ▲9,839,216
- President: A. A. Rahim
- General Secretary: Himaghnaraj Bhattacharyya
- Website: www.dyfi.org.in

Democratic Youth Federation of India (DYFI) is a youth organisation in India. It was founded in its inaugural conference held from 1–3 November 1980 at Saraba village in Ludhiana, Punjab. DYFI was formed as an independent youth organization with ties to leftist ideologies. Over time, it has become the youth wing of the Communist Party of India (Marxist).

DYFI identifies itself to be an independent organisation. Former West Bengal chief minister Buddhadeb Bhattacharjee who was a former secretary of Bengal fraction, and a founder Central Committee member of DYFI, Manik Sarkar – the former chief minister of Tripura – was a vice president of the organisation, and M. Vijayakumar who was the speaker of Kerala legislative assembly was once former all-India president of DYFI. In 2021, M.B. Rajesh, a former all-India president of DYFI was elected as the Speaker of Kerala legislative assembly.

As of 2012, DYFI had a membership of 2.2 million which rose from 1.4 million in 2011. The annual membership fee of DYFI is a meager Rs. 2 and is open to all youth between the age 15 and 40 irrespective of their political ideology.

== Affiliations ==
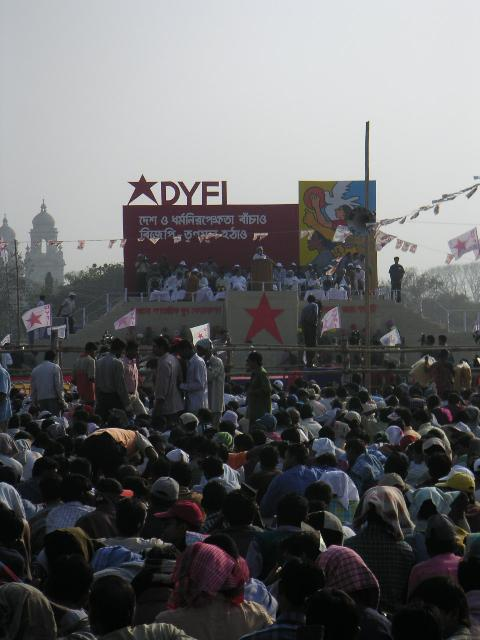
DYFI rally in Kolkata

DYFI is a member of World Federation of Democratic Youth. The DYFI affiliate in Jammu and Kashmir is called Jammu & Kashmir Democratic Youth Federation. In Tripura there is a separate body, affiliated to DYFI, called Tribal Youth Federation.

== History ==
The organisation was formed on 3 November 1980 from its inaugural conference held at Sarabha Village, Ludhiana, Punjab from 31 October to 3 November.

On 25 November 1994, five members of DYFI were killed after being shot by state police force during a protest against the commercialisation of higher education at Kuthuparamba in Kannur district, Kerala, while one was paralysed.

== Publications ==
At the national level, DYFI publishes the magazine Naujawan Drishti (Youth Vision). On the state level there are various publications, such as Jubashakti (Youth Power) in West Bengal, Yuvadhara (Youth Stream) in Kerala, Izhaingar Muzhakkam in Tamil Nadu, and Yuvasangharsh (Youth Struggle) in Maharashtra.

== See also ==
- Students' Federation of India
- All India Youth Federation
