= 2021 Tripura Tribal Areas Autonomous District Council election =

2021 election in Tripura Tribal Areas

- 6 April 2021

28 out of 30 seats in the Tripura Tribal Areas Autonomous District Council 15 seats needed for a majority
- Turnout: 85.74% ▲
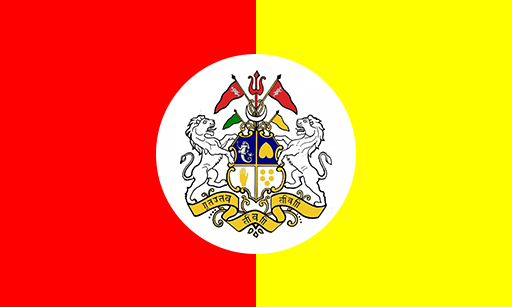

	First party	Second party	Third party
Party	TMP	BJP	INPT
Alliance	TMP+	NDA	TMP+
Seats won	16	9	2
Seat change	▲16	▲9	▲2
Popular vote	274,565	137,357	68,254
Percentage	37.43%	18.72%	9.30%
Swing	▲37.43%	▲10.85%	▼1.47%
	Fourth party	Fifth party	Sixth party
Party	CPI(M)	IPFT	INC
Alliance	Left Front	NDA	UPA
Seats won	0	0	0
Seat change	▼25	–	–
Popular vote	91,406	77,946	16,425
Percentage	12.46%	10.62%	2.24%
Swing	▼36.20%	▼7.44%	▼3.25%
Chief Executive Member before election
Radhacharan Debbarma
CPI(M)
Chief Executive Member
Purna Chandra Jamatia
TMP

Elections to the Tripura Tribal Areas Autonomous District Council (TTAADC) of India were held on 6 April 2021. 25 of the 28 elected seats in the Autonomous District Council are reserved for Scheduled Tribes.

There were 865,041 eligible voters in the elections. The votes were counted on 10 April 2021 with a victory for the TIPRA-INPT alliance. The TIPRA party led alliance won 18 seats in the election while the BJP led alliance won 9 seats. The Left Front was reduced to 0.

== Parties and alliances ==
=== Left Front ===
Party	Flag	Symbol	Seats contested
Communist Party of India (Marxist)			28

=== National Democratic Alliance ===
Party	Flag	Symbol	Seats contested
Indigenous People's Front of Tripura			18
Bharatiya Janata Party			12
Total			30 (Note: BJP and IPFT will have a friendly contest in two constituencies.)

=== Tipra Motha Party ===
Party	Flag	Symbol	Seats contested
Tipra Motha Party			23
Indigenous Nationalist Party of Twipra			5
Total			28

=== United Progressive Alliance ===
Party	Flag	Symbol	Seats contested
Indian National Congress			28

== Campaign ==
The Left Front consisting of the Communist Party of India (Marxist), Communist Party of India, All India Forward Bloc and RSP declared its candidates list for 28 seats on 6 March 2021. The Indigenous People's Front of Tripura (IPFT) announced it candidates list for 18 seats on 7 March 2021. The TIPRA of Maharaja Kirit Pradyot Deb Barman and its alliance party Indigenous Nationalist Party of Tripura (INPT) announced their first list of candidates for 17 seats and 5 seats respectively on 8 March 2021. The Indian National Congress (INC) also announced its list of candidates for all 28 seats on 8 March 2021.

== Candidates ==
District	Constituency	Reservation	Left Front		NDA		TMP–INPT	
District	Constituency	Reservation	Party	Candidate	Party	Candidate	Party	Candidate
1	Damchharra–Jampui	ST	CPI(M)	Rajendra Reang	IPFT	Jitendra Reang	TMP	Bhaba Ranjan Reang
2	Machmara	None	CPI(M)	Narayan Bhowmik	BJP	Swapna Rani Das	TMP	Sadhan Chakma
3	Dasda–Kanchanpur	None	CPI(M)	Lalit Debnath	BJP	Sailendra Nath	TMP	Hemanta Chakma
4	Karamchhara	ST	CPI(M)	Shantimani Chakma	BJP	Bimal Chakma	INPT	Bijoy Hrangkhawl
5	Chhawmanu	ST	CPI(M)	Champarai Aslong	BJP	Angsha Tripura	TMP	Ratanjoy Tripura
6	Manu–Chailengta	None	CPI(M)	Motilal Sukla Baidya	BJP	Sanjay Das	INPT	Ratish Tripura
7	Demchhara–Kachuchhara	ST	CPI(M)	Badarbul Halam	IPFT	Biresh Debbarma	TMP	Dhirendra Debbarma
8	Ganganagar–Gandachhara	ST	CPI(M)	Alendra Reang	IPFT	Jibanjoy Reang	TMP	Nakuljoy Reang
9	Halahali–Asharambari	ST	CPI(M)	Arun Debbarma	IPFT	Bhabesh Debbarma	TMP	Ananta Debbarma
10	Kulai–Champahour	ST	CPI(M)	Sukhamoy Debbarma	IPFT	Shyamal Debbarma	TMP	Animesh Debbarma
11	Maharanipur–Teliamura	ST	CPI(M)	Jharna Debbarma	IPFT	Gita Debbarma	TMP	Kamal Kalai
12	Ramchandraghat	ST	CPI(M)	Joyshree Debbarma	IPFT	Mintu Debbarma	TMP	Suhel Debbarma
13	Simna–Tamakari	ST	CPI(M)	Kumud Debbarma	IPFT	Mangal Debbarma	TMP	Rabindra Debbarma
14	Bodhjungnagar–Wakkinagar	ST	CPI(M)	Pradip Debbarma	BJP	Ranabir Debbarma	TMP	Runiel Debbarma
14	Bodhjungnagar–Wakkinagar	ST	CPI(M)	Pradip Debbarma	IPFT	Budha Debbarma	TMP	Runiel Debbarma
15	Jirania	ST	CPI(M)	Radhacharan Debbarma	IPFT	Ajit Debbarma	INPT	Jagadish Debbarma
16	Mandainagar–Pulinpur	ST	CPI(M)	Sukumar Debbarma	IPFT	Balaram Debbarma	TMP	Chitta Ranjan Debbarma
17	Pekuarjala–Janmejoynagar	ST	CPI(M)	Netaji Debbarma	IPFT	Prakash Debbarma	TMP	Ganesh Debbarma
18	Takarjala–Jampaijala	ST	CPI(M)	Anjana Kalai Debbarma	IPFT	Brajalal Debbarma	TMP	Pradyot Manikya Debbarma
19	Amtali–Golaghati	ST	CPI(M)	Mayarani Debbarma	BJP	Bishu Debbarma	INPT	Umashankar Debbarma
20	Killa–Bagma	ST	CPI(M)	Amrit Sadhan Jamatia	BJP	Joy Kishore Jamatia	TMP	Purna Chandra Jamatia
21	Maharani–Chelagang	ST	CPI(M)	Haradhan Jamatia	BJP	Samrat Jamatia	TMP	Sindhu Kanya Jamatia
22	Kathalia–Mirja–Rajapur	ST	CPI(M)	Parikshit Murasingh	BJP	Padma Luchan Tripura	TMP	David Murasingh
22	Kathalia–Mirja–Rajapur	ST	CPI(M)	Parikshit Murasingh	IPFT	Sukla Charan Noatia	TMP	David Murasingh
23	Ampinagar	ST	CPI(M)	Bhakta Kalai	IPFT	Janak Hari Jamatia	TMP	Sadagar Kalai
24	Raima Valley	ST	CPI(M)	Prabin Tripura	BJP	Ratiram Tripura	TMP	Rajesh Tripura
25	Nutanbazar–Malbasa	ST	CPI(M)	Magendra Reang	BJP	Matindra Reang	TMP	Dolly Reang
26	Birchandranagar–Kalashi	ST	CPI(M)	Satyajit Reang	BJP	Sanjit Reang	TMP	Harendra Reang
27	Purba Muhuripur–Buratali	ST	CPI(M)	Jogendra Tripura	IPFT	Dhananjoy Tripura	TMP	Debajit Tripura
28	Silachhari–Manubankul	ST	CPI(M)	Uchathoi Mog	BJP	Kangjaong Mog	INPT	Dhansen Tripura

== Incidents ==
The total voting process was peaceful. However there were reports of minor disturbances in two constituencies, namely Budhjung Nagar-Wakkinagar and Amtali-Golaghati. The TIPRA accused the ruling BJP for creating the disturbance.

== Results ==
The votes were scheduled to be counted on 10 April 2021 and in the counting the TIPRA party won 16 seats with its alliance partner INPT winning 2 seats in the election while the BJP won 9 seats with 1 seat going to an independent candidate.

=== Results by party and alliance ===
Party	TMP+	NDA	IND	Nom
Seats	18	9	1	2

Vote Share by alliance
1. TMP+ (46.7%)
2. NDA (29.3%)
3. LF (13.1%)
4. UPA (2.24%)
5. Independents (6.97%)
6. Other (1.59%)

Alliance	Party	Popular vote			Seats		
Alliance	Party	Vote	%	+/-	Contested	Won	+/-
TMP+	Tipra Motha Party	274,565	37.43	▲37.43	23	16	▲16
TMP+	Indigenous Nationalist Party of Twipra	68,254	9.30	▼1.47	5	2	▲2
Total		342,819	46.73	▲35.96	28	18	▲18
NDA	Bharatiya Janata Party	137,357	18.72	▲10.85	12	9	▲9
NDA	Indigenous People's Front of Tripura	77,946	10.62	▼7.44	16	0	Steady
Total		215,303	29.34	▲3.41	28	9	▲9
Left Front	Communist Party of India (Marxist)	91,406	12.46	▼36.20	25	0	▼25
Left Front	Communist Party of India	4,924	0.67	▼1.51	1	0	▼1
Left Front	All India Forward Bloc				1	0	▼1
Left Front	Revolutionary Socialist Party				1	0	▼1
Total		96,330	13.13	▼41.08	28	0	▼28
UPA	Indian National Congress	16,425	2.24	▼3.25	28	0	Steady
None	Independents	51,106	6.97	▲5.42	38	1	▲1
None	NOTA	7,327	1.00		N/A		
Total		733,629	100		28	28	

=== Winning Candidates ===
No.	Constituency	Winner	Party	Margin
1	Damchharra-Jampui	Bhaba Ranjan Reang	TIPRA	1,132
2	Machmara (UR)	Swapna Rani Das	BJP	1,563
3	Dasda-Kanchanpur (UR)	Sailendra Nath	BJP	1,495
4	Karamchharra	Bimal Kanti Chakma	BJP	375
5	Chhawmanu	Hongsha Kumar Tripura	BJP	5820
6	Manu-Chailengta (UR)	Sanjay Das	BJP	825
7	Demchara-Kachucharra	Dhirendra Debbarma	TIPRA	8,792
8	Ganganagar-Gandachharra	Bhumika Nanda Reang	Independent	66
9	Hala Hali-Asharambari	Ananta Debbarma	TIPRA	8,131
10	Kulai-Champahour	Animesh Debbarma	TIPRA	10,176
11	Maharanipur-Teliamura	Kamal Kalai	TIPRA	10,142
12	Ramchandra Ghat	Suhel Debbarma	TIPRA	13,417
13	Simna-Tamakari	Rabindra Debbarma	TIPRA	7,484
14	Bodhjung Nagar-Wakkinagar	Runiel Debbarma	TIPRA	10,401
15	Jirania	Jagdish Debbarma	TIPRA	12,240
16	Mandainagar-Pulinpur	Chitta Ranjan Debbarma	TIPRA	10,010
17	Pekuarjala-Janmejaynagar	Ganesh Debbarma	TIPRA	9,103
18	Takarjala-Jampuijala	Pradyot Kishore Deb Barman	TIPRA	10,194
19	Amtali-Golaghati	Umashankar Debbarma	TIPRA	14,715
20	Killa-Bagma	Purna Chandra Jamatia	TIPRA	7,703
21	Maharani-Chellagang	Samrat Jamatia	BJP	1,812
22	Kathalia-Mirja-Rajapur	Padmaluchan Tripura	BJP	352
23	Ampinagar	Sadagar Kalai	TIPRA	1,509
24	Raima Valley	Rajesh Tripura	TIPRA	1,009
25	Natunbazar-Malbasa	Dolly Reang	TIPRA	1,127
26	Birchandranagar-Kalashi	Sanjit Reang	BJP	1,183
27	Purba Mahuripur-Buratali	Debajit Tripura	TIPRA	3,037
28	Silachari-Manubankul	Kangjaong Mog	BJP	4,116

=== Constituency wise results ===
Constituency		TIPRA – INPT		BJP – IPFT		Left Front	
1	Damchharra-Jampui (ST)	Bhaba Ranjan Reang	8,178	Jitendra Reang	5,272	Rajendra Reang	7,046
2	Machmara	Sadhan Chakma	6,565	Swapna Rani Das	10,275	Narayan Bhowmick	8,712
3	Dasda-Kanchanpur	Hemanta Chakma	7,346	Sailendra Nath	8,841	Lalit Debnath	6,475
4	Karamchhara (ST)	Bijoy Kumar Hrangkhawl	11,198	Bimal Kanti Chakma	11,573	Shantimani Chakma	7,504
5	Chhawmanu (ST)	Ratanjoy Tripura	6,216	Hongsha Kumar Tripura	12,036	Champarai Aslong	4,478
6	Manu-Chailengta	Ratish Tripura	8,569	Sanjay Das	9,394	Motilal Shukla Baidya	5,346
7	Demchara-Kachuchharra (ST)	Dhirendra Debbarma	12,862	Biresh Debbarma	4,070	Badarbul Halam	3,217
8	Ganganagar-Gandachharra (ST)	Nakuljoy Reang	6,241	Jibanjoy Reang	3,552	Alendra Reang	4,166
9	Halahali-Asharambari (ST)	Ananta Debbarma	15,420	Bhabesh Debbarma	7,289	Arun Debbarma	3,320
10	Kulai-Champahour (ST)	Animesh Debbarma	16,158	Shyamal Debbarma	5,982	Sukhamoy Debbarma	2,741
11	Maharanipur-Teliamura (ST)	Kamal Kalai	16,100	Gita Debbarma	5,958	Jharna Debbarma	997
12	Ramchandraghat (ST)	Suhel Debbarma	18,154	Mintu Debbarma	4,987	Joyshree Debbarma	1,025
13	Simna-Tamakari (ST)	Rabindra Debbarma	13,578	Mangal Debbarma	6,094	Kumud Debbarma	
14	Bodhjung Nagar-Wakkinagar (ST)	Runeil Debbarma	15,728	Ranabir Debbarma	5,323	Pradip Debbarma	597
15	Jirania (ST)	Jagadish Debbarma	17,680	Ajit Debbarma	5,440	Radhacharan Debbarma	1,598
16	Mandainagar-Pulinpur (ST)	Chitta Ranjan Debbarma	15,558	Balaram Debbarma	5,548	Sukumar Debbarma	
17	Pekuarjala-Janmayjaynagar (ST)	Ganesh Debbarma	14,683	Prakash Debbarma	5,222	Netaji Debbarma	
18	Takarjala-Jampuijala (ST)	Pradyot Bikram Manikya	13,164	Brajlal Debbarma	2,786	Anjana Kalai Debbarma	419
19	Amtali-Golaghati (ST)	Umashankar Debbarma	22,088	Bishu Debbarma	7,363	Mayarani Debbarma	
20	Killa-Bangma (ST)	Purna Chandra Jamatia	14,880	Joy Kishore Jamatia	7,177	Amrit Sadhan Jamatia	
21	Maharani-Chellagang (ST)	Sindu Kanya Jamatia	5,873	Samrat Jamatia	7,685	Haradhan Jamatia	
22	Kathalia-Mirja-Rajapur (ST)	David Murasingh	13,568	Padmaluchan Tripura	13,920	Porikkhit Murasingh	
23	Ampinagar (ST)	Sadagar Kalai	9,048	Janak Hari Jamatia	7,539	Bhakta Kalai	
24	Raima Valley (ST)	Rajesh Tripura		Ratiram Tripura		Prabin Tripura	
25	Natunbazar-Malbasa (ST)	Dolly Reang	13,855	Matindra Reang	12,728	Magendra Reang	
26	Birchandranagar-Kalashi (ST)	Harendra Reang	10,897	Sanjit Reang	12,080	Satyajit Reang	
27	Purba Mahuripur-Buratali (ST)	Debajit Tripura	11,228	Dhananjoy Tripura		Jogendra Tripura	7,921
28	Silachari-Manubankul (ST)	Dhansen Tripura		Kangjaong Mog	13,572	Uchathoi Mog	9,465
	Total						

== Members of the Executive Committee ==
The Executive committee of the TTAADC was formed by notification of the CEO on 23 April 2021 by TIPRA, the winning party alliance after getting elected and installed by the Governor of the state. The list of the Executive members are as follows:

As in March 2024

S.No	Name	Constituency	Portfolios	Party
Chief Executive Member
1.	Purna Chandra Jamatia	Killa-Bagma	General Administration [including Appointment and Services]; Finance; Law; Planning; Industries; Village Committee, All policies and any other Department (s) which are not allocated to any Members	TMP
Executive Members
2.	Kamal Kalai	Maharanipur-Teliamura	Health; Tribal Welfare; Tourism	TMP
3.	Bhaba Ranjan Reang	Damchherra-Jampui	Agriculture & Horticulture; Forests; LRS	TMP
4.	Smt. Dolly Reang	Natunbazar-Malbasa	Social Welfare & Social Education	TMP
5.	Rajesh Tripura	Raima Valley	ARDD; Fisheries	TMP
6.	Suhel Debbarma	Ramchandra Ghat	Youth Affairs & Sports; ICA	TMP
7.	Ananta Debbarma	Halahali-Asharambari	Co-operatives; Science, Technology & Environment	TMP
8.	Rabindra Debbarma	Simna-Tamakari	Education; Kokborok Department	TMP
9.	Runeil Debbarma	Bodhjungnagar-Wakkinagar	Public Works Department; Rural Development (R.D)	TMP

== See also ==
- Tipraland
- 2015 Tripura Tribal Areas Autonomous District Council election
- 2010 Tripura Tribal Areas Autonomous District Council election
- 2005 Tripura Tribal Areas Autonomous District Council election
- 2000 Tripura Tribal Areas Autonomous District Council election
