= 2010 Tripura Tribal Areas Autonomous District Council election =

2010 election in Tripura Tribal Areas

- 3 May 2010

28 out of 30 seats in the Tripura Tribal Areas Autonomous District Council

	First party	Second party	Third party
Party	CPI(M)	INC	INPT
Alliance	Left Front (Tripura)	N/A	N/A
Seats won	25	0	0
Seat change	▲4	-	-
Popular vote	302,540	105,925	60,321
Chief Executive Member before election
Ranjit Debbarma
CPI(M)
Chief Executive Member
Ranjit Debbarma
CPI(M)

Elections to the Tripura Tribal Areas Autonomous District Council (TTAADC) were held on 3 May 2010. On that day elections were held for 27 of the 28 elected seats in the Autonomous District Council. In one seat (Maharani-Chellagong) the election was countermanded, following the death of Bharatiya Janata Party candidate Ranjit Jamatia. 25 of the 28 elected seats in the Autonomous District Council are reserved for Scheduled Tribes.

Security arrangements ahead of the election were tight. The Tripura Home Department had identified 91 polling stations as "hyper-sensitive" and 347 as "sensitive". Authorities in Tripura had asked the Indian government to provide an additional thirty paramilitary companies to ensure the electoral process.

There were 636,169 eligible voters. The electoral turnout stood at 83.69%. The votes were counted on 7–8 May 2010. The election result was a landslide victory for the Left Front. The Left Front, with 63.81% of the votes cast, won all 27 seats that were up for election. 25 seats went to the Communist Party of India (Marxist), one seat to the Communist Party of India and one seat to the All India Forward Bloc.

The Indian National Congress emerged as a second-largest party in the election. The party finished second in 18 seats. Amongst its candidates was Debabrata Koloi, former TTAADC Chief Executive Member. Other parties in the fray were the Indigenous Nationalist Party of Tripura, the Indigenous People's Front of Tripura (an INPT splinter-group, that campaigned for a separate TTAADC state), the National Socialist Party of Tripura, National Conference of Tripura, All India Trinamool Congress and BJP. NCT and Trinamool Congress contested in an alliance. 44 candidates were independents. In total 122 candidates had filed their nominations. The Left Front, Congress and INPT each contested all 28 seats.

== Results ==
=== Results by party ===
Party	Popular vote			Seats		
Party	Vote	%	+/-	Contested	Won	+/-
Communist Party of India (Marxist)	302,540	59.63	▲2.80	25	25	▲4
Communist Party of India	13,262	2.61	▼	1	1	Steady
All India Forward Bloc	7,939	1.56	▼	1	1	Steady
Revolutionary Socialist Party			▲	1	1	Steady
**Total**	323,741	63.81	▼8.20	28	28	Steady
Indigenous Nationalist Party of Twipra	60,321	11.89	▼1.3			Steady
Bharatiya Janata Party			▲			Steady
Indian National Congress	105,925	20.88	▲8.8			Steady
Independents			▲			Steady
**Total**	507,300	100		28	28	

=== Constituency wise results ===
Constituency		Left Front		Congress		INPT	
1	Damchharra-Jampui (ST)	**Rajendra Reang**	11777	Chandiram Reang	4766	Lal Rin Puia Molsoi	922
2	Machmara	**Paresh Chandra Sarkar** (AIFB)	7939	Ruhidas Chandra Sahaji	7589	Bimal Chakma	273
3	Dasda-Kanchanpur	**Lalit Debnath**	11163	Rabindra Kumar Kar	7355	Nepal Chandra Reang	945
4	Karamchhara (ST)	**Sanbdhya Rani Chakma**	13878	Raju Chakma	7258	Lura Darlong	769
5	Chhawmanu (ST)	**Gajendra Tripura**	9471	Mukal Kanti Chakma	3975	Subha Ranjan Chakma	1863
6	Manu-Chailengta	**Matilal Sukal Baidya**	10561	Basudeb Das	6771	Hapaiti Reang	1357
7	Damchara-Kachuchharra (ST)	**Sabitri Debbarma**	10975	Purana Mohan Tripura	5246	Naidhanjoy Halam	1960
8	Ganganagar-Gadachharra (ST)	**Judhisthir Reang**	8509	Shabda Rai Reang	2847	Amar Krishna Tripura	2462
9	Hala Hali-Asharambari (ST)	**Gurupada Debbarma**	14978	Rinku Debbarma	3009	Renu Kumar Debbarma	1306
10	Kulai-Champahour (ST)	**Madhumati Debbarma**	11472	Anita Debbarma	1601	Kartik Kalai	2716
11	Maharanipur-Teliamura (ST)	**Dhananjoy Debbarma**	11760	Rajendra Reang	1865	Surendra Mohan Jamatia	1353
12	Ramchandra Ghat (ST)	**Ranjit Debbarma**	13893	Kalyani Debbarma	259	Swapana Debbarma	1221
13	Simna-Tamakari (ST)	**Ranabir Debbarma**	10967	Amiya Debbarma	362	Shibanjali Debbarma	4408
14	Budhung Nagar-Wakkinagar (ST)	**Jahar Debbarma**	10204	Sachindra Debbarma	992	Rabindra Debbarma	6098
15	Jirania (ST)	**Radhacharan Debbarma**	12990	Jiten Debbarma	699	Jamu Debberma	5745
16	Mandainagar-Pulinpur (ST)	**Sukumar Debbarma**	10742	Chakra Dhar Debbarma	1386	Chandroday Rupini	4395
17	Pekuajala-Janmayjaynagar (ST)	**Santosh Debbarma**	12040	Balaram Debbarma	2265	Ramani Debbarma	3057
18	Takarjala-Jampuijala (ST)	**Ramendra Debbarma**	8099	Sridam Debbarma	680	Sindhukanya Jamatia	3704
19	Amtali-Golaghati (ST)	**Shyamlal Debbarma**	15576	Kamal Krishna Debbarma	4585	Rajesh Debberma	2229
20	Killa-Bangma (ST)	**Joykishore Jamatia**	10366	Rathindra Jamatia	5953	Purna Chandra Jamatia	2124
21	Maharani-Chellagong (ST)	Joy Bahadur Jamatia (RSP)	-	Pramod Reang	-	Samrat Jamatia	-
22	Kathalia-Mirja-Rajapur (ST)	**Parikshit Murashit Murasingh**	16912	Indramanik Jamatia	5953	Naidar Bashi Tripura	578
23	Ampinagar (ST)	**Alindra Debbarma**	11268	Manindra Kalai Singha	1697	Madhusudhan Kalai	4157
24	Raimavelly (ST)	**Patiram Tripura**	9864	Laljoy Chakma	3856	Dhirendra Tripura	2176
25	Natunbazar-Malbasa (ST)	**Shantanu Jamatia**	14934	Eradhan Uchui	6443	Krishna Mohan Jamatia	2298
26	Birchandranagar-Kalashi (ST)	**Dhirendra Reang** (CPI)	13262	Brighuram Reang	6048	Chandi Basi Murasing	694
27	Purba Mahuripur-Buratali (ST)	**Arun Tripura**	15305	Swapan Kr. Tripura	5175	Kriti Mohan Tripura	607
28	Silachari-Manubankul (ST)	**Mongsajal Mog**	14836	Kamal Dewan	7290	Dharjya Tripura	904

Source: '(ST)' indicates that the seat is reserved for Scheduled Tribes. Names of winning candidates in bold text. Left Front candidates are from CPI(M) unless stated otherwise. Only results of Left Front, Congress and INPT candidates are listed above. In the Ramchandra Ghat constituency, Saranjit Debbarma of the National Council of Tripura finished second with 2,158 votes.

== See also ==
- 2015 Tripura Tribal Areas Autonomous District Council election
- 2005 Tripura Tribal Areas Autonomous District Council election
- 2000 Tripura Tribal Areas Autonomous District Council election
