= 2000 Tripura Tribal Areas Autonomous District Council election =

2000 election in Tripura Tribal Areas

- 30 April 2000, 3 May 2000

28 out of 30 seats in the Tripura Tribal Areas Autonomous District Council

	First party	Second party
Party	Indigenous People's Front of Tripura (IPFT)	CPI(M)
Alliance		Left Front (Tripura)
Seats won	18	8
Seat change	▲18	▼	-
Popular vote	203,630	100,283
Chief Executive Member before election
CPI(M)
Chief Executive Member
Debabrata Koloi
IPFT

Elections to the Tripura Tribal Areas Autonomous District Council (TTAADC) were held on 30 April and 3 May 2000. The results were declared on 6 May 2000.

During the April–May 2000 TTAADC elections, several parties — including the BJP, Trinamool Congress, Nationalist Congress Party, Janata Dal (United), and especially the Tripura Upajati Juba Samity (TUJS) — chose to boycott the polls, citing the worsening insurgency situation in the state. However, the Congress(I), despite being associated with this broader understanding, decided at the last moment to contest the elections, resulting in a triangular contest between Congress(I), the Left Front, and the IPFT.

The election result was a victory for the Indigenous People's Front of Tripura (IPFT). The IPFT won 18 seats that were up for election. The Communist Party of India (Marxist) was the second largest party with 8 seats.

== Results ==
=== Results by party ===
Party	Popular vote			Seats		
Party	Vote	%	+/-	Contested	Won	+/-
Indigenous People's Front of Tripura	203,630	56.10		27	18	
Communist Party of India (Marxist)	100,283	27.58	▼	24	8	▼
Communist Party of India	10,952	3.01		2	1	
All India Forward Bloc	4,640	1.28		1	1	
Revolutionary Socialist Party	2,232	0.61		1	0	
Indian National Congress	34,899	9.61		19	0	
Total	363,541	100		28	28	

=== Constituency wise results ===
Constituency		Left Front	IPFT	Congress
1	Damchharra-Jampui (ST)	3,105	10,655	
2	Machmara	4,640 (AIFB)	3,635	2,468
3	Dasda-Kanchanpur	4,404	5,531	2,511
4	Karamchhara (ST)	5,338	9,587	2,132
5	Chhawmanu (ST)	1,968	10,574	444
6	Manu-Chailengta	3,465	6,715	2,226
7	Damchara-Kachuchharra (ST)	2,494	11,215	188
8	Ganganagar-Gadachharra (ST)	3,503	6,680	
9	Hala Hali-Asharambari (ST)	6,236	7,720	615
10	Kulai-Champahour (ST)	3,811	7,825	
11	Maharanipur-Teliamura (ST)	5,816	4,988	
12	Ramchandra Ghat (ST)	4,212	7,716	55
13	Simna-Tamakari (ST)	5,597	1,436	132
14	Budhung Nagar-Wakkinagar (ST)	5,525	3,113	1,904
15	Jirania (ST)	8,478	4,833	
16	Mandainagar-Pulinpur (ST)	2,049	10,906	29
17	Pekuajala-Janmayjaynagar (ST)	1,139	14,111	
18	Takarjala-Jampuijala (ST)	383	10,303	
19	Amtali-Golaghati (ST)	2,937 (CPI)	15,724	217
20	Killa-Bangma (ST)	3,327	7,183	162
21	Maharani-Chellagong (ST)	2,232 (RSP)	8,301	366
22	Kathalia-Mirja-Rajapur (ST)	14,314	1,563	4,652
23	Ampinagar (ST)	3,281	10,847	
24	Raima Valley (ST)	5,113	4,903	312
25	Natunbazar-Malbasa (ST)	5,598	8,256	2,464
26	Birchandranagar-Kalashi (ST)	8,015 (CPI)	7,401	669
27	Purba Mahuripur-Buratali (ST)	Uncontested (CPM)		
28	Silachari-Manubankul (ST)	10,065	180	5,705

== See also ==
- 2026 Tripura Tribal Areas Autonomous District Council election
- 2021 Tripura Tribal Areas Autonomous District Council election
- 2015 Tripura Tribal Areas Autonomous District Council election
- 2010 Tripura Tribal Areas Autonomous District Council election
- 2005 Tripura Tribal Areas Autonomous District Council election
