= 2015 Tripura Tribal Areas Autonomous District Council election =

2015 election in Tripura Tribal Areas

- 4 May 2015

28 out of 30 seats in the Tripura Tribal Areas Autonomous District Council

	First party	Second party	Third party
Party	CPI(M)	IPFT	INPT
Alliance	Left Front	-	-
Seats won	25	0	0
Seat change	-	-	-
Popular vote	311,852	115,252	68,694
Chief Executive Member before election
Ranjit Debbarma
CPI(M)
Chief Executive Member
Radha charan Debbarma
CPI(M)

Elections to the Tripura Tribal Areas Autonomous District Council (TTAADC) were held on 4 May 2015. 25 of the 28 elected seats in the Autonomous District Council are reserved for Scheduled Tribes.

There were 638,060 eligible votes cast in the elections. The electoral turnout stood at 83%. The votes were counted on 6 May 2015. The election result was a landslide victory for the Left Front. The Left Front, with 48.88% of the votes cast, won all 28 seats that were up for election. 25 seats went to the Communist Party of India (Marxist), one seat to the Communist Party of India, one seat to the RSP and one seat to the All India Forward Bloc.

The Indigenous People's Front of Tripura (IPFT) emerged as a second-largest party in the election. The party finished second in 17 seats. Other parties in the fray were the Indigenous Nationalist Party of Tripura, National Conference of Tripura, All India Trinamool Congress and BJP.

== Results ==
=== Results by party ===
Party	Popular vote			Seats		
Party	Vote	%	+/-	Contested	Won	+/-
Communist Party of India (Marxist)	311,852	48.88	▼	25	25	Steady
Communist Party of India	13,904	2.18	▼	1	1	Steady
All India Forward Bloc	11,066	1.73	▼	1	1	Steady
Revolutionary Socialist Party	9,054	1.42	▼	1	1	Steady
Total	345,876	54.21	▼9.6	28	28	Steady
Indigenous Nationalist Party of Twipra	68,694	10.77	▼0.56			Steady
Bharatiya Janata Party	50,245	7.87	▲			Steady
Indigenous People's Front of Tripura	115,252	18.06	▲			Steady
Indian National Congress	35,024	5.49	▼14.4			Steady
Independents	9,885	1.55	▲			Steady
NOTA	6,499	1.02				
Total	638,060	100		28	28	

=== Constituency wise results ===
Constituency		Left Front		IPFT		INPT	
1	Damchharra-Jampui (ST)	Rajendra Reang	13,259	Banaful Tripura	377	Dambajoy Reang	1,703
2	Machmara	Paresh Chandra Sarkar (AIFB)	11,066	N/A	N/A	Mahali Chakma	843
3	Dasda-Kanchanpur	Lalit Debnath	12,510	Pusparam Reang	311	Sindrai Reang	2,035
4	Karamchhara (ST)	Sandya Rani Chakma	14,150	Bidyut Debbarma	2,305	David Darlong	3,051
5	Chhawmanu (ST)	Champarai Aslong	10,284	Ganesh Debbarma	386	Shobha Ranjan Chakma	3,484
6	Manu-Chailengta	Matilala Suklabaidya	10,728	Sarajit Debbarma	1,448	Subodh Dangshu	5,418
7	Damchara-Kachuchharra (ST)	Badarbum Halam	10,868	Biresh Debbarma	3,366	Kartik Debbarma	5,569
8	Ganganagar-Gandachharra (ST)	Khagendra Kumar Reang	9,259	Prem Sadhan Tripura	311	Jiban Joy Reang	6,637
9	Hala Hali-Asharambari (ST)	Gurupada Debbarma	15,714	Rabindra Debbarma	4,347	Gaura Kishore Debbarma	1,219
10	Kulai-Champahour (ST)	Madhumati Debbarma	11,758	Jiban Debbarma	2,178	Bisanjay Reang	5,045
11	Maharanipur-Teliamura (ST)	Dhananjoy Debbarma	11,818	Mevar Kumar Jamatia	5,553	Jakta Dayal Jamatia	1,339
12	Ramchandra Ghat (ST)	Ranjit Debbarma	12,036	Chitta Ranjan Debbarma	6,402	Shibchandra Debbarma	594
13	Simna-Tamakari (ST)	Ranabir Debbarma	7,905	Mangal Debbarma	7,396	Pritilata Debbarma	2,837
14	Budhjung Nagar-Wakkinagar (ST)	Jahar Debbarma	9,921	Rajendra Debbarma	4,580	Pradip Debbarma	5,421
15	Jirania (ST)	Radhacharan Debbarma	13,151	Briha Debbarma	4,250	Jamu Debbarma	4,238
16	Mandainagar-Pulinpur (ST)	Sukumar Debbarma	10,782	Balaram Debbarma	7,416	Uttam Kumar Debbarma	1,397
17	Pekuarjala-Janmayjaynagar (ST)	Santosh Debbarma	12,204	Bikash Debbarma	6,078	Haratosh Debbarma	1,862
18	Takarjala-Jampuijala (ST)	Ramendra Debbarma	8,557	Sona Charan Debbarma	4,254	Sarna Kumar Kalai	1,313
19	Amtali-Golaghati (ST)	Maya Rani Debbarma	15,554	Ram Mohan Debbarma	9,998	Nani Gopal Debbarma	1,041
20	Killa-Bangma (ST)	Joy Kishore Jamatia	11,105	Krishna Kanta Jamatia	4,779	Krishna Sadhan Jamatia	2,498
21	Maharani-Chellagang (ST)	Joy Bahadur Jamatia (RSP)	9,054	Rana Kishore Reang	2,687	Samrat Jamatia	1,714
22	Kathalia-Mirja-Rajapur (ST)	Parikshit Murasingh	20,030	Sukla Charan Noatia	6,363	Maha Kumar Uchoi	538
23	Ampinagar (ST)	Bhakta Kalai	11,187	Sindhu Chandra Jamatia	4,165	Madhu Sudhan Jamatia	1,281
24	Raima Valley (ST)	Pratiram Tripura	10,941	Pradip Jamatia	1,003	Pramod Tripura	2,718
25	Natunbazar-Malbasa (ST)	Santanu Jamatia	16,837	Birbahadur Jamatia	4,215	Ram Krishna Jamatia	2,444
26	Birchandranagar-Kalashi (ST)	Dhirendra Reang (CPI)	13,904	Balindra Reang	5,482	Jitendra Reang	1,399
27	Purba Mahuripur-Buratali (ST)	Arun Tripura	15,502	Manu Tripura	9,015	Chandi Das Tripura	195
28	Silachari-Manubankul (ST)	Sathai Mog	15,892	Bolijoy Tripura	6,586	Kangchairi Mog	861
	Total	48.88%	311,852	18.06%	115,252	10.77%	68,694

== See also ==
- 2010 Tripura Tribal Areas Autonomous District Council election
- 2005 Tripura Tribal Areas Autonomous District Council election
- 2000 Tripura Tribal Areas Autonomous District Council election
