= Ambassa Assembly constituency =

Legislative Assembly constituency in Tripura State, India

Coordinates: 23.92°N 91.84°E

Ambassa
- Constituency No. 47 for the Tripura Legislative Assembly

Constituency details
- Country: India
- Region: Northeast India
- State: Tripura
- District: Dhalai
- Lok Sabha constituency: Tripura East
- Established: 2008
- Total electors: 51,296
- Reservation: ST
- Party: TMP
- Alliance: NDA
- Elected year: 2023

Ambassa is one of the 60 Legislative Assembly constituencies of Tripura state in India.

It is part of Dhalai district and is reserved for candidates belonging to the Scheduled Tribes.

== Members of the Legislative Assembly ==
Year	Member	Picture	Party
2013	Lalit Kumar Debbarma		Communist Party of India
2018	Parimal Debbarma		Bharatiya Janata Party
2023	Chitta Ranjan Debbarma		Tipra Motha Party

== Election results ==
=== 2023 Assembly election ===
2023 Tripura Legislative Assembly election: Ambassa
Party	Candidate	Votes	%	±%
TMP	Chitta Ranjan Debbarma	15,317	33.27%	New
BJP	Suchitra Debbarma	14,824	32.19%	▼17.22
CPI(M)	Amalendu Debbarma	13,373	29.04%	New
Independent	Karna Dhan Chakma	821	1.78%	New
AITC	Chandan Mog Chowdhury	751	1.63%	New
NOTA	None of the Above	583	1.27%	▲0.16
Independent	Krishna Kumar Debbarma	376	0.82%	New
Margin of victory		493	1.07%	▼7.43
Turnout		46,045	89.92%	▼2.26
Registered electors		51,296		▲11.92
TMP gain from BJP		Swing	▼16.15	

=== 2018 Assembly election ===
2018 Tripura Legislative Assembly election: Ambassa
Party	Candidate	Votes	%	±%
BJP	Parimal Debbarma	20,842	49.42%	▲47.70
CPI(M)	Bharat Reang	17,257	40.92%	▼8.19
INPT	Bijoy Kumar Hrangkhawl	2,184	5.18%	▼41.17
INC	Sachitra Debbarma	629	1.49%	New
NOTA	None of the Above	465	1.10%	New
Tripura Peoples Party	Parkaroy Reang	315	0.75%	New
Margin of victory		3,585	8.50%	▲5.74
Turnout		42,174	91.01%	▼0.67
Registered electors		45,832		▲11.23
BJP gain from CPI(M)		Swing	▲0.31	

=== 2013 Assembly election ===
2013 Tripura Legislative Assembly election: Ambassa
Party	Candidate	Votes	%	±%
CPI(M)	Lalit Kumar Debbarma	18,755	49.11%	New
INPT	Bijoy Kumar Hrangkhawl	17,701	46.35%	New
BJP	Pradip Debbarma	655	1.72%	New
Independent	Bimal Debbarma	598	1.57%	New
IPFT	Krishan Kumar Debbarma	481	1.26%	New
Margin of victory		1,054	2.76%	
Turnout		38,190	92.82%	
Registered electors		41,203		
CPI(M) win (new seat)				

== See also ==
- List of constituencies of the Tripura Legislative Assembly
- Dhalai district
