= Suhel Debbarma =

Indian politician

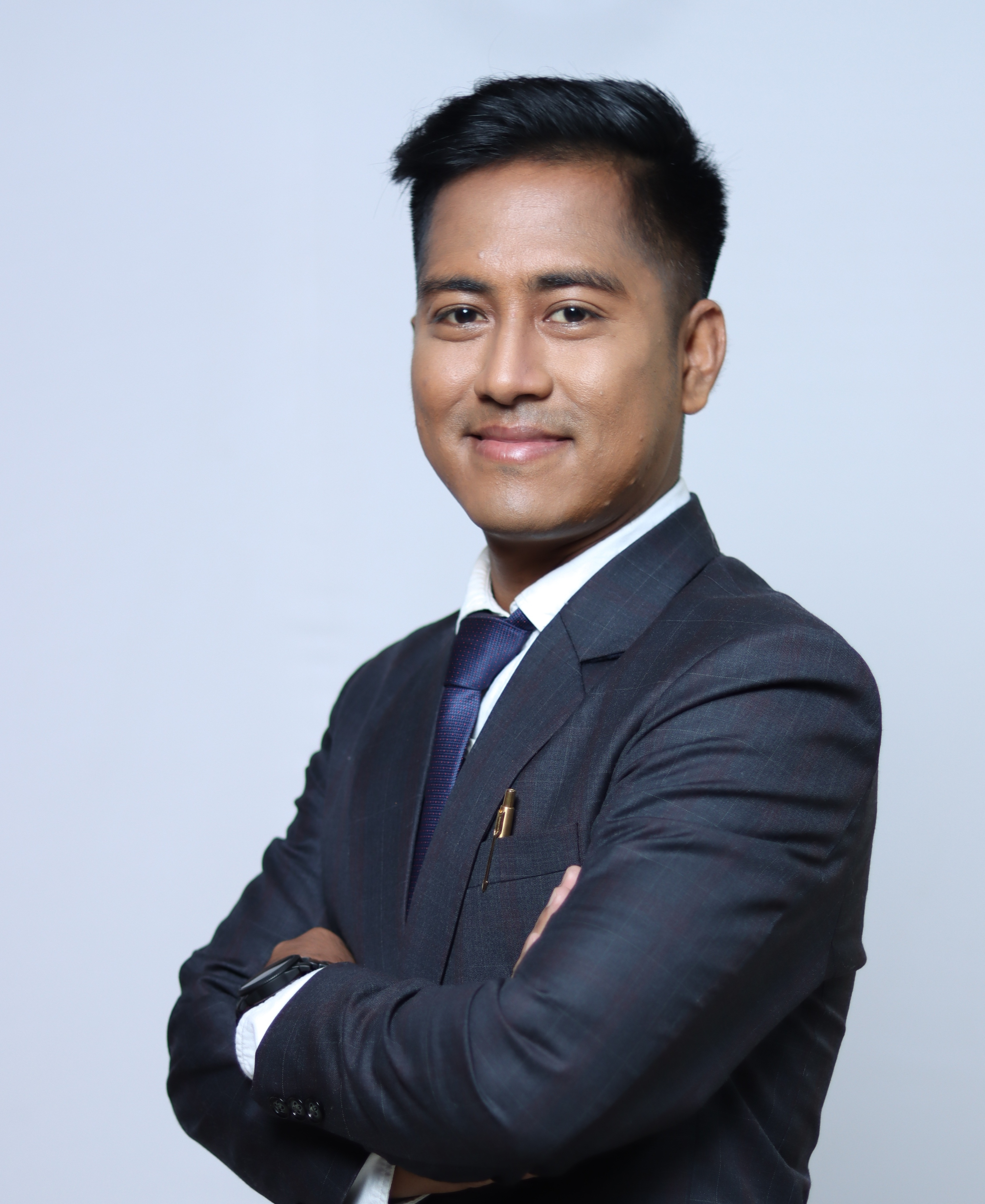
- Official portrait, 2023

Executive Member of Tripura Tribal Areas Autonomous District Council
- Incumbent
- Assumed office 19 April 2021
- Departments: Sports; Youth Affairs; Information and Cultural Affairs
- Preceded by: Ranjit Debbarma
- Constituency: Ramchandraghat

Personal details
- Born: 6 June 1989 (age 36) Langkapura, Khowai
- Party: TIPRA Motha Party
- Other political affiliations: Indigenous People's Front of Tripura (formerly)
- Education: B. Tech (Information Technology), LL.B
- Alma mater: RVS College of Engineering and Technology (Coimbatore), ICFAI University, Tripura
- Occupation: Politician; Lawyer

Suhel Debbarma (born 6 June 1989) is an Indian politician and executive member of the Tripura Tribal Areas Autonomous District Council (TTAADC). He is a youth leader of the TIPRA Motha Party.

== Education ==
After finishing his school education, Suhel studied B.Tech. (Information Technology) from RSV College of Engeenering and Technology, Anna University in Coimbatore.

Further, in 2021, he completed his law (LLB) degree from ICFAI University, Tripura.

== Politics ==
Suhel Debbarma joined Pradyot Bikram Manikya Deb Barma TIPRA Motha Party in 2019 as a youth leader. In 2021, he was selected as a candidate for the TTAADC election. He contested from the 12 Ramchandra Ghat constituency against the former CEM Ranjit Debbarma and won.

He was swore in as an Executive Member with portfolios of Sports and Youth Affairs Department of Tripura Tribal Autonomous District Council on 17 April 2021. He is also one of the youngest member to be an executive member of the council.

After the 2021 TTAADC Election, Debbarma became executive Member of TTAADC, Tripura from Ramchandra Ghat Constituency.

Debbarma also runs a drugs awareness campaign for Tripura youth.

== Music career ==
Debbarma have written and performed Kokborok song. He also released a rendition of Bimal Debbarma in 2023.
