= Chitta Ranjan Debbarma =

Indian politician

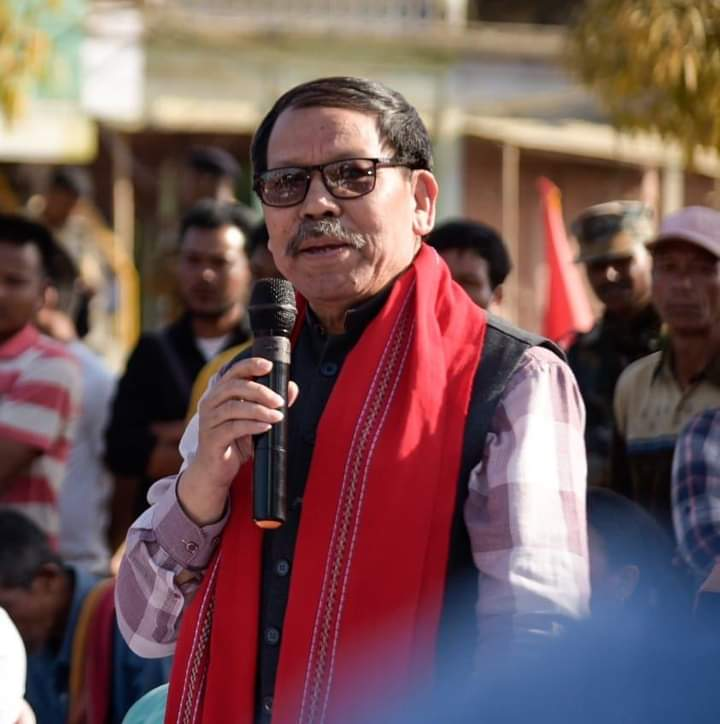

Member of the Tripura Legislative Assembly
- Incumbent
- Assumed office 17 March 2023
- Preceded by: Parimal Debbarma
- Constituency: Ambassa Assembly constituency

Executive Member of Tripura Tribal Areas Autonomous District Council
- In office 19 April 2021 – March 2024
- Constituency: Mandainagar-Pulinpur

Personal details
- Born: 22 January 1961 (age 65) Kamalpur, Dhalai, Tripura
- Party: Tipra Motha Party
- Other political affiliations: Indigenous People's Front of Tripura and Tipraland State Party
- Education: St. Anthony's College (BA) North Eastern Hill University (MA)
- Profession: Civil Servant, Lecturer, and Social Activist

Chitta Ranjan Debbarma (born 22 January 1961) is an Indian politician and a Member of Tripura Legislative Assembly who represents the Ambassa Assembly constituency. He is a Member of the Tipra Motha Party. He was the founder and president of the Tipraland State Party, which merged with the Tipraha Indigenous Progressive Regional Alliance (TIPRA) in 2021. The Tipra Motha Party was registered with the Election Commission of India in January 2023.

== Political career ==
Debbarma first joined the Indigenous People's Front of Tripura in April 2015; but left to found his own political party known as Tipraland State Party in October, 2015. He also started movements demanding the formation of a Tipraland State under Article 3 of the Constitution of India. His TSP merged with the Tipraha Indigenous Progressive Regional Alliance in February 2021.

== Early life and education ==
Debbarma graduated from Kamalpur High School in 1979. He did his honours in Economics in 1984 at Saint Anthony's College under NEHU, Shillong. He completed his M.A in Economics at NEHU in 1988.
