= Jagadish Debbarma =

Indian politician

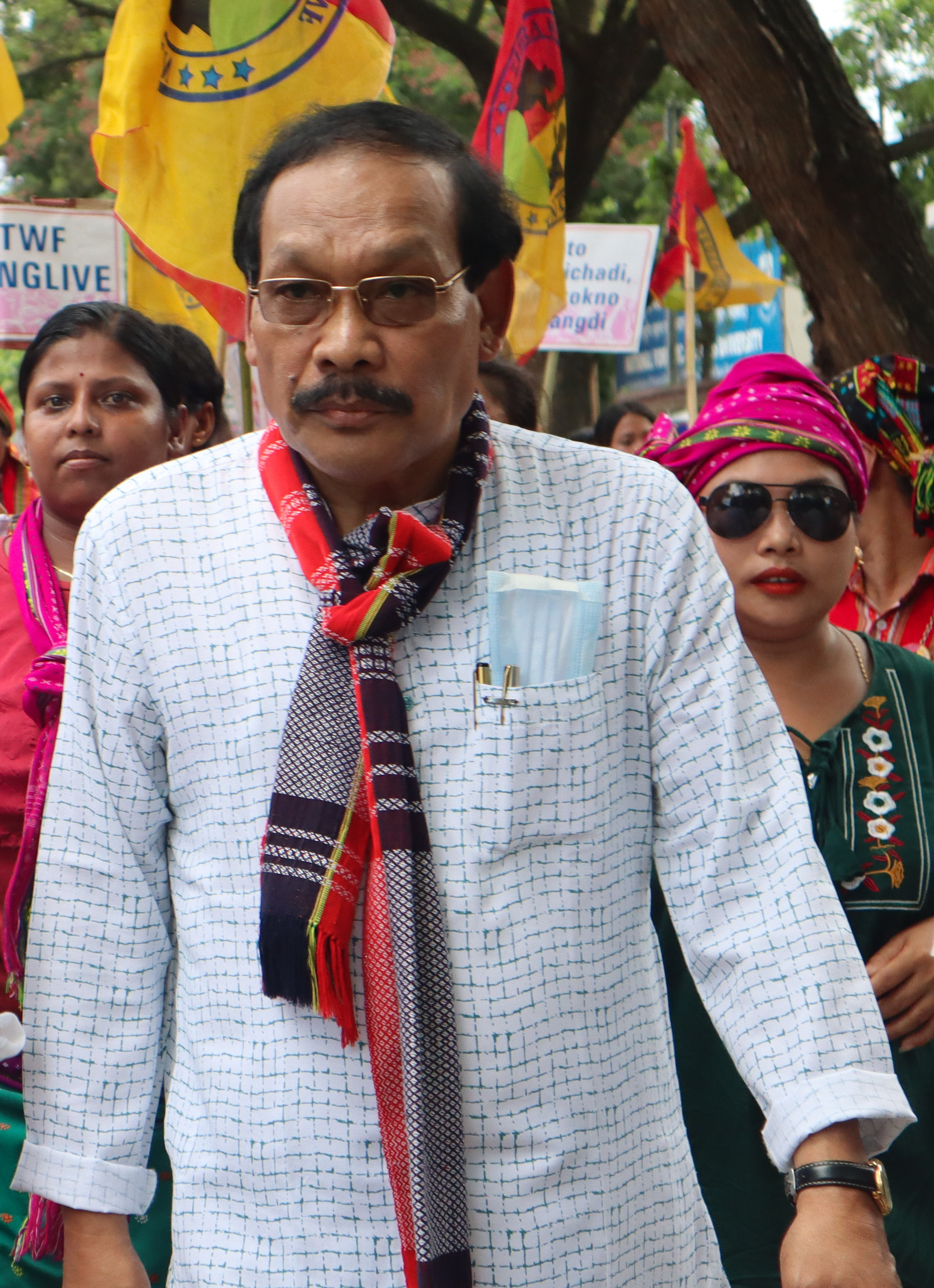
- Jagadish Debbarma at Tipra Women Federation Rally in 2023

Chairman of Tripura Tribal Areas Autonomous District Council TTAADC
- In office 20 April 2021 – 6 May 2026
- Preceded by: Ranjit Debbarma
- Succeeded by: Bhaba Ranjan Reang

Member of District Council Tripura Tribal Areas Autonomous District Council
- Incumbent
- Assumed office 19 April 2021
- Preceded by: Radhacharan Debbarma
- Constituency: 15-Jirania, (ST)

Personal details
- Born: 8 December 1956 (age 69)
- Party: Tipra Motha Party (since 2021); Indigenous Nationalist Party of Twipra (2002-2021)
- Education: Bachelor of Commerce, Hons
- Alma mater: University of Calcutta
- Occupation: Politician, Statesman

Jagadish Debbarma (born 8 December 1956) is an Indian veteran senior politician and elected former Chairman of the Tripura Tribal Areas Autonomous District Council (TTAADC). He served as the Chairman of the Council from 2021 to 2026, and he is also the Member of District Council since 19 April 2021. Jagadish Debbarma is an also the human rights defender and one of the member of the indigenous Borok community in India. He is recognized as a senior party leader of the Indigenous Nationalist Party of Twipra (INPT). Now merged with the Tipra Motha Party (TMP) on 11 June 2021. Earlier he was the chairperson and General Secretary of the party (INPT).

== Political career ==
Debbarma ran for MDC in the 2021 TTAADC election which was held on 6 April 2021. His party the Indigenous Nationalist Party of Twipra forged an alliance with TIPRA Motha and contested on five seats and won on two seats. He won the 15-Jirania constituency seat under the West Tripura district. And became a Member of the District Council (MDC). .

On 19 April 2021, at the oath-taking ceremony, Debbarma was unanimously elected as the TTAADC chairman. This was the second time he chaired the council, from 1990 to 1995.
