= Rajendra Reang =

Indian politician

- Succeeded by: Babaranjan Reang
- Constituency: Damcherra-Jampui

Personal details
- Born: Kanchanpur
- Party: Communist Party of India (Marxist)

Rajendra Reang is an Indian politician and the former Executive Member of Tripura Tribal Areas Autonomous District Council. He is the member of the Communist Party of India (Marxist) and the former President of Tribal Youth Federation(TYF).

He represent 1-Damcherra-Jampui constituency in North Tripura district in Tripura Tribal Areas Autonomous District Council.

== See also ==
- Radhacharan Debbarma
- Daniel Jamatia
