= Tripura People's Front =

Tripura People Front
- Abbreviation: TPF
- Leader: Patal Kanya Jamatia
- President: Patal Kanya Jamatia
- Founder: Patal Kanya Jamatia
- Split from: Indigenous People's Front of Tripura
- Merged into: Bhartiya Janata Party
- Ideology: Anti-immigration
- Colours

Election symbol

Tripura People's Front (TPF) was a regional party in Tripura, India. It celebrated its third foundation day in July 2017. On 20 March 2022, it merged with the Bharatiya Janata Party.

TPF was active in tribal areas.
