= 2005 Tripura Tribal Areas Autonomous District Council election =

2005 election in Tripura Tribal Areas

- 5 March 2005

28 out of 30 seats in the Tripura Tribal Areas Autonomous District Council

	First party	Second party	Third party
Party	CPI(M)	INPT	INC
Alliance	Left Front (Tripura)
Seats won	28	0	0
Seat change		-	-
Popular vote	296,865	54,769	52,617
Chief Executive Member before election
IPFT
Chief Executive Member
Ranjit Debbarma
CPI(M)

Elections to the Tripura Tribal Areas Autonomous District Council (TTAADC) were held on 5 March 2005.

The election result was a landslide victory for the Left Front. The Left Front, with 71.63% of the votes cast, won all 28 seats that were up for election. 21 seats went to the Communist Party of India (Marxist), 4 seats for NSPT, one seat to the Communist Party of India, one seat for RSP and one seat to the All India Forward Bloc.

The Indigenous Nationalist Party of Twipra was the second largest party with 13.22% vote share and Indian National Congress emerged as a third-largest party in the election with 12.70% of the votes.

== Results ==
=== Results by party ===
Party	Popular vote			Seats		
Party	Vote	%	+/-	Contested	Won	+/-
Communist Party of India (Marxist)	235,728	56.88	▲	21	21	▲13
Communist Party of India	11,233	2.71	▲	1	1	Steady
All India Forward Bloc	9,661	2.33	▲	1	1	Steady
Revolutionary Socialist Party	8,726	2.10	▲	1	1	▲1
Nationalist Socialist Party of Tripura	31,517	7.60	▲	4	4	▲4
Total	296,865	71.63	▲	28	28	▲
Indigenous Nationalist Party of Twipra	54,769	13.22	▼			▼18
Bharatiya Janata Party	4,505	1.09	▲			Steady
Indian National Congress	52,617	12.70	▼			Steady
Independents	5,671	1.37	▲			Steady
Total	414,427	100		28	28	

=== Constituency wise results ===
Constituency		Left Front	Congress	INPT
1	Damchharra-Jampui (ST)	8084	3288	1067
2	Machmara	9661	4030	805
3	Dasda-Kanchanpur	9815	2916	1186
4	Karamchhara (ST)	11512	4227	494
5	Chhawmanu (ST)	9171	1076	2007
6	Manu-Chailengta	8760	2253	1050
7	Damchara-Kachuchharra (ST)	8865	1328	1556
8	Ganganagar-Gadachharra (ST)	7892	1746	1539
9	Hala Hali-Asharambari (ST)	13264	1530	1029
10	Kulai-Champahour (ST)	8969	1065	2796
11	Maharanipur-Teliamura (ST)	9883	899	2459
12	Ramchandra Ghat (ST)	11080	379	2687
13	Simna-Tamakari (ST)	8314	312	4142
14	Budhung Nagar-Wakkinagar (ST)	9444	682	4233
15	Jirania (ST)	10822	470	5167
16	Mandainagar-Pulinpur (ST)	9325	1510	2092
17	Pekuajala-Janmayjaynagar (ST)	10722	1262	2273
18	Takarjala-Jampuijala (ST)	5599	760	2332
19	Amtali-Golaghati (ST)	15966	1587	1286
20	Killa-Bangma (ST)	11413	2013	2909
21	Maharani-Chellagong (ST)	8726	464	2340
22	Kathalia-Mirja-Rajapur (ST)	17360	2974	999
23	Ampinagar (ST)	12143	1770	1921
24	Raimavelly (ST)	9395	2161	1262
25	Natunbazar-Malbasa (ST)	13012	4431	1676
26	Birchandranagar-Kalashi (ST)	11233	2891	1242
27	Purba Mahuripur-Buratali (ST)	14057	1260	679
28	Silachari-Manubankul (ST)	12378	3333	1541

== See also ==
- 2015 Tripura Tribal Areas Autonomous District Council election
- 2010 Tripura Tribal Areas Autonomous District Council election
