= Parimal Debbarma =

Indian Tripuri Politician

Member of the Tripura Legislative Assembly
- In office 2018–2023
- Preceded by: Lalit Kumar Debbarma
- Succeeded by: Chitta Ranjan Debbarma
- Constituency: Ambassa

Personal details
- Born: Tripura, India
- Party: Bharatiya Janata Party

Parimal Debbarma is a Tipra Indian politician from Tripura. He is a leader of the Bharatiya Janata Party's Ambassa committee. From 2018 to 203, he was a Member of the Legislative Assembly representing Ambassa.
