= Lalit Kumar Debbarma =

Indian politician

Member of the Tripura Legislative Assembly
- In office 2013–2018
- Succeeded by: Parimal Debbarma
- Constituency: Ambassa

Personal details
- Born: 12 January 1948 (age 78) Tripura, India
- Party: Communist Party of India (Marxist)

Lalit Kumar Debbarma is a politician from Tripura, India.

In 2013 assembly elections, he represent 47- Ambassa constituency in Dhalai district in Tripura Legislative Assembly. He is the elder brother of present MLA Parimal Debbarma.
