= Borkung Hrangkhawl =

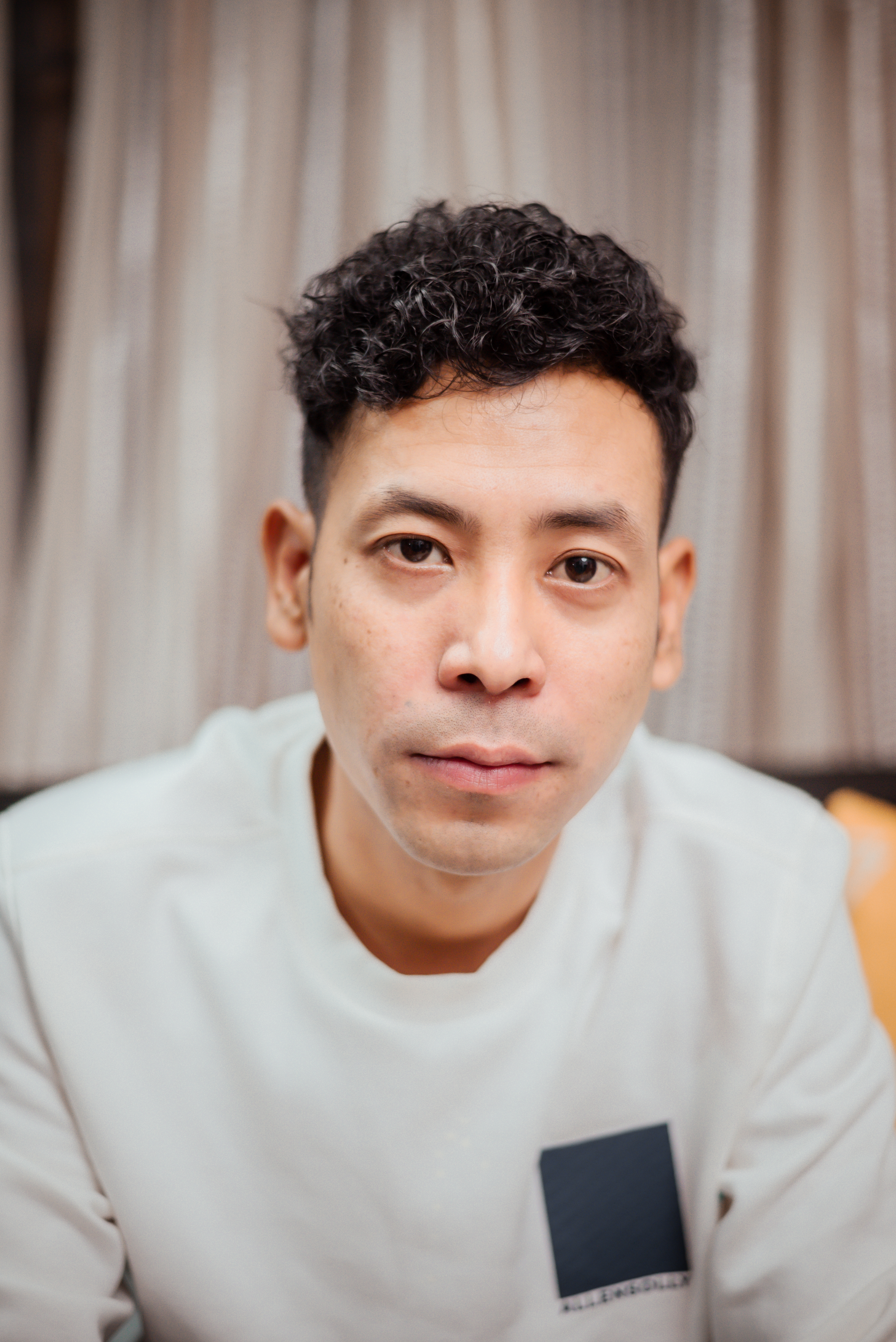
- Borkung in 2014

Background information
- Also known as: B.K.
- Born: October 7, 1987 (age 38); Agartala, Tripura
- Origin: Agartala
- Genres: Hip hop
- Occupations: Rapper; Songwriter; Singer
- Years active: 2012–present
- Label: Times Music
- Spouse: Sentienla Lemtur

Borkung Hrangkhawl (born October 7, 1987) also known as B.K., is a Tripuri rapper, singer and songwriter from Tripura. He won a VIMA Asia Award and is well known in Northeast India. He is the son of Tripura politician, Bijoy Kumar Hrangkhawl.

== Discography ==
=== Singles ===
| Year | Title | Featuring |
|---|---|---|
| 2021 | 8 | Moko Koza |
| 2020 | FAX | |
| 2020 | OPPOSITE | |
| 2016 | Fighter | |
| 2015 | Hashtag I Wanna Be Famous | |
| 2014 | Never Give Up | |
| 2013 | Free | BK & INA |
| 2013 | Fighter | Meyi |
| 2013 | The Journey | |
| 2012 | The Roots ("Chini Haa") | |

== Other Appearances ==
Hrangkhwal also made an appearance at TEDxYouth@RonaldsayRoad, the first-ever TEDx event in the easternmost state of India. On the 20th of November 2021 made a Talk about self-promotion and belief and spoke on how to make your own path and scale new heights. Also speaking at the event were local celebrities and activists.
