= Tipraland State Party =

- Abbreviation: TSP
- Leader: C.R. Debbarma
- President: Chittaranjan (C.R) Debbarma
- Secretary: David Murasing
- Founder: Chitta-Ranjan Debbarma
- Founded: 25 October 2015
- Dissolved: 2021
- Merged into: Tipraha Indigenous Progressive Regional Alliance
- Ideology: Tripuri nationalism Tipraland
- ECI Status: Regional Party (Tripura)

Tipraland State Party (TSP) is a regional political party in Tripura, India.

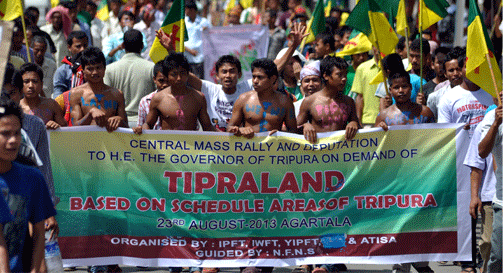
A rally by TSP

TSP is the main ruling party in Tripura tribal areas, autonomous district, TTAADC. It belief relate to Tripuri nationalism, social reformation, and revolution for the Tripuri nation. The main demand of the party is to elevate Tripura Tribal Areas Autonomous District Council to Tipraland statehood under Article 3 of the Indian Constitution. TSP used to be active in the Indigenous Tripuri areas of Tripura between 2015 and 2021.

== History ==
The party was formed on October 25, 2015, by retired Tripura Civil Service (TCS) Officer Chitta Ranjan Debbarma and former Vice President of Twipra Students' Federation (TSF) Ex-Member, Advisory Board, TSF; onetime General Secretary, Tripura Tribal Officers' Forum. Shri Sonacharan Debbarma is the vice-president.

The founding president is Debbarma.

The TSP leaders submitted a memorandum demanding that Tipraland be made a state to Shri Narendra Modi, the Prime Minister of India on 1 April 2018. He assured them he would examine the issue and emphasized that discussions and meetings should continue on the issue.

The Indigenous Nationalist Party of Twipra (INPT), Tipraland State Party (TSP) and IPFT (Tipraha) merged with the Tipraha Indigenous Progressive Regional Alliance (TIPRA) party in 2021.
