= Bijoy Kumar Hrangkhawl =

Indian politician

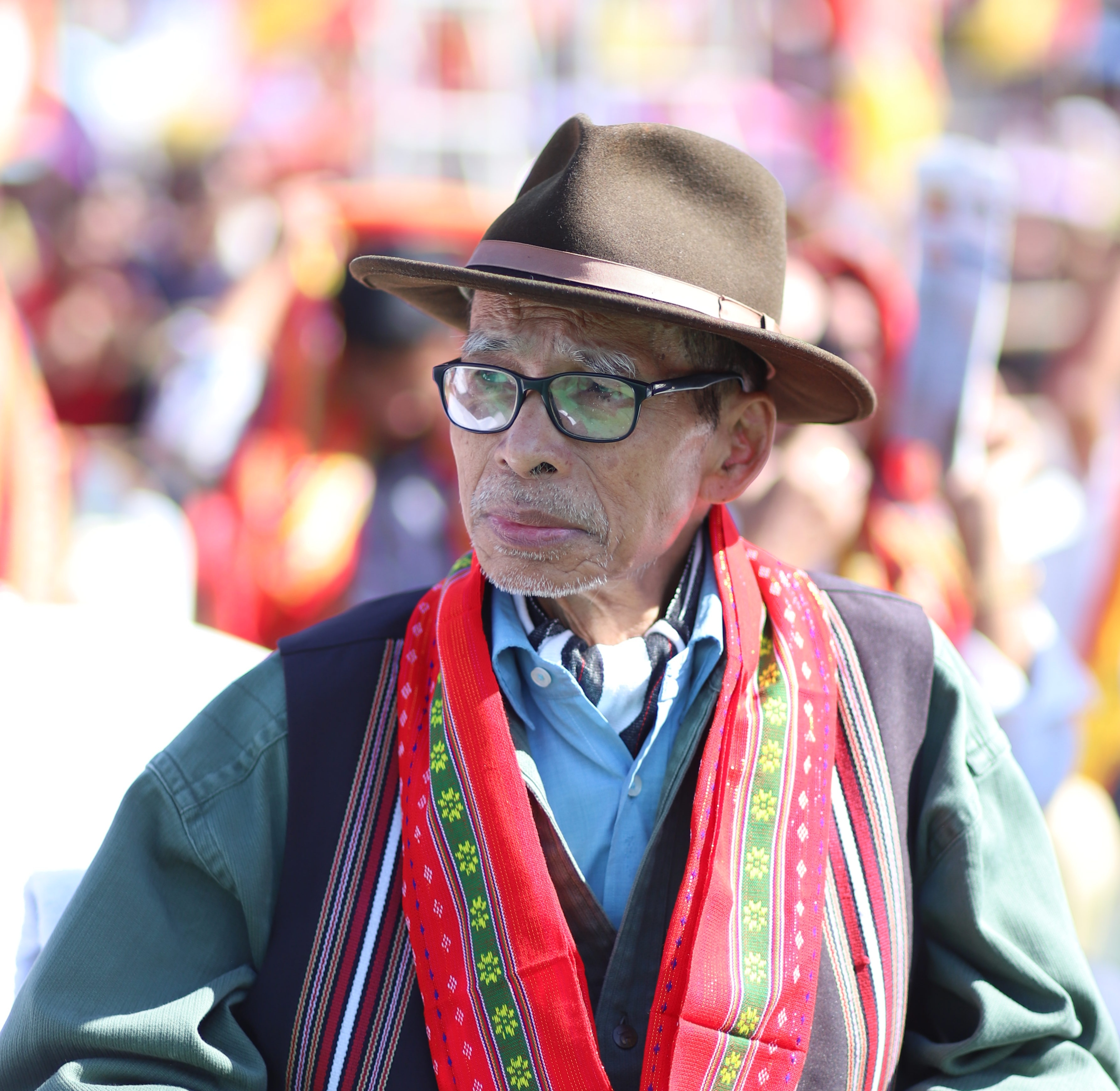
- Hrangkhawl in 2025

1st President of TIPRA Motha Party
- Incumbent
- Assumed office 2021
- Preceded by: Office Established

Member, Administrative Reforms Committee of TTAADC
- Incumbent
- Assumed office 17 June 2021
- Preceded by: Office Established

Member of Legislative Assembly
- In office 1998–2013
- Preceded by: Hasmai Reang
- Succeeded by: Diba Chandra Hrangkhawl
- Constituency: Kulai

Personal details
- Born: Bijoy Kumar Hrangkhawl; 25 January 1946 (age 80) Tripura, India
- Party: Tipra Motha Party
- Other political affiliations: Indigenous Nationalist Party of Twipra (2002–2021)
- Spouse: Linda Hrangkhawl
- Children: 3 including Borkung Hrangkhawl
- Committees: Member, Advisory of Administrative Reforms Committee, TTAADC Government (2021-present); Member, Business Advisory Committee, Tripura Legislative Assembly (2008-2009)

Bijoy Kumar Hrangkhawl (born 25 January 1946) is the current president of the Tipraha Indigenous Progressive Regional Alliance (TIPRA). He is a three-time MLA and former leader of the Indigenous Nationalist Party of Twipra (INPT), a political party based in the Indian state of Tripura.

== Early life ==
=== Marriage and family ===
After finishing school in Shillong, Bijoy Kumar Hrangkhawl married Linda Hrangkhawl. The couple had a son Borkung Hrangkhawl and a daughter. His son, Borkung, is a popular singer-songwriter who is celebrated across Northeast India. Hrangkhawl has acknowledged the support of his wife Linda on his political journey from the beginning, who has influenced him to keep striving for peace and the movement for the Indigenous people of Tripura.

I don't deny that Linda (his wife) influenced my decision to surrender...I have no hesitation to admit that she alone was 25 per cent responsible for this (the Tripura) accord.

== Greater Tipraland Movement ==
On June 7, 2021, the INPT merged with the TIPRA. On 11 June 2021, Hrangkhawl was elected as the president of The Indigenous Progressive Regional Alliance (TIPRA), now the Tipra Motha Party (TMP) led by Pradyot Bikram Manikya Deb Barma, marking a milestone in his participation in the statehood movement for Greater Tipraland and for the Indigenous Tiprasa people.

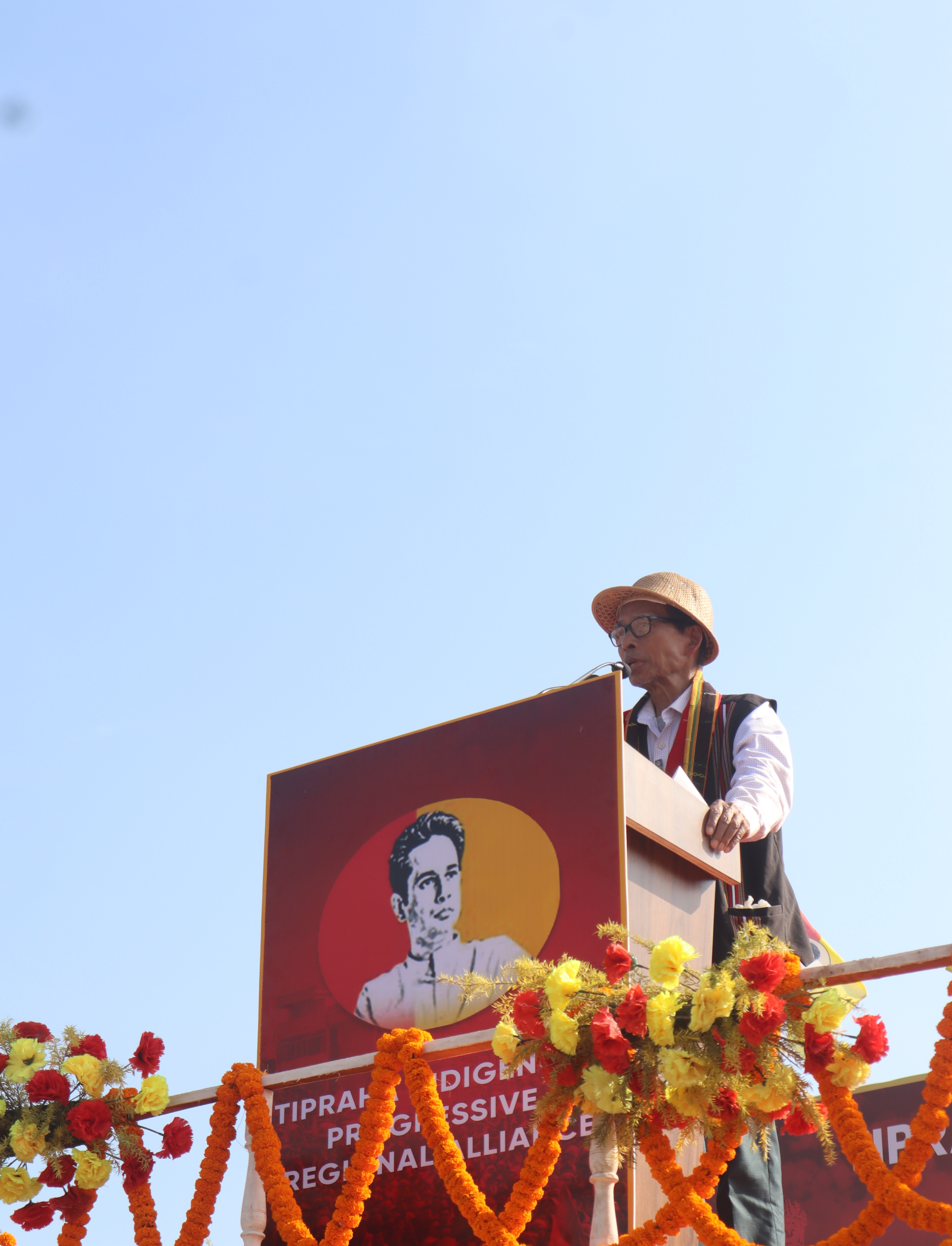
Bijoy Kumar Hrangkhawl addressing a mass gathering for Greater Tipraland at Astabal Ground, Agartala, Tripura on November 12, 2022.

== Tripuri Nationalism leadership between 1978–1988 ==
Hrangkhawl began his political career as an organising secretary in the ethno-nationalist Tripura Upajati Juba Samiti. He became the leader of the Tripuri Sena, the militant wing of TUJS. The Tripuri Sena was formed following the Left Front victory in 1977, and it engaged in physical combat against the left. The organization soon evolved into the Tripura National Volunteers.

For ten years, 1978–1988, Hrangkhawl led an armed struggle as the leader of the TNV, which sought to expel the Bengali majority from Tripura. TNV soon became infamous for their campaign of ethnic cleansing in the rural areas of Tripura. In 1983 he expressed the political ambitions of TNV in the following words in a letter to the then-Prime Minister, Indira Gandhi:

Armed insurgency was necessary to reach your heart. Either you deport all foreign nationals who infiltrated into Tripura after 15 October 1947 or settle them anywhere in India other than Tripura... We demand a free Tripura.

In 1988, the Tripura National Volunteers signed a peace treaty (the TNV Accord) with the Government of India and Government of Tripura after which the TNV was converted into a political party. The FNV later merged with the INPT.

== Political career ==
After signing the TNV Accord in 1988, Bijoy Hrangkhawl joined mainstream politics with The Indigenous Nationalist Party of Twipra (INPT). He oversaw the implementation of the agreement and the reservation of three more seats for the Indigenous Tiprasa people in the Tripura Assembly.

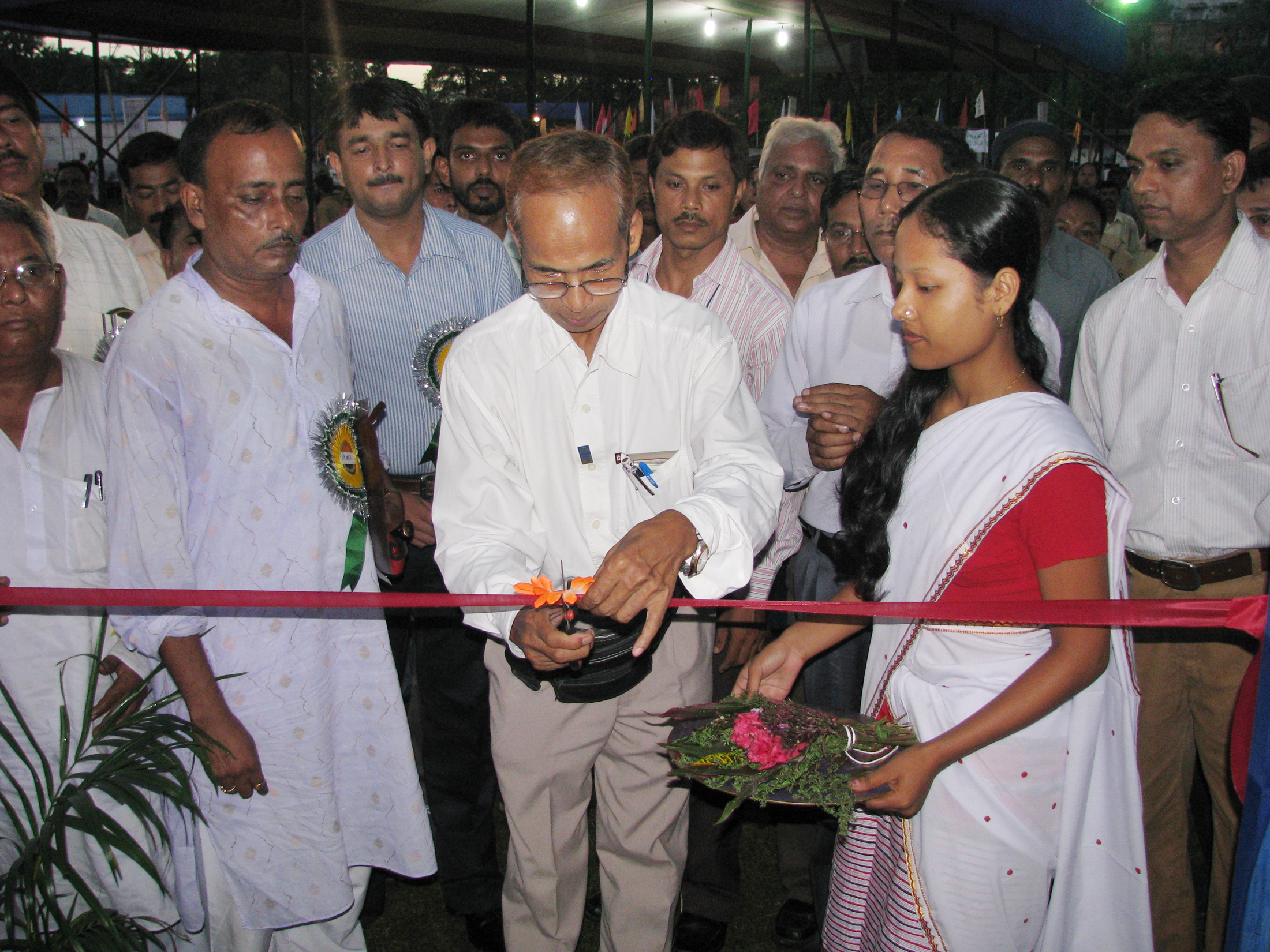
Bijoy Kumar Hrangkhwal inaugurating the photo exhibition stall on Bharat Nirman and Development initiative in North East, organised by DAVP, at Manughat, Dhalai district, Tripura.

Following the 1998 Tripura Legislative Assembly Election, Bijoy Kumar Hrangkhawl became a Member of Legislative Assembly from the Kulai constituency as an Independent candidate. Hrangkhawl went on to contest two more elections in 2003 and 2008, both of which he won.

== Written works ==
- A Never Ending Journey-I (2026)
