= Tipraland =

Proposed state in India

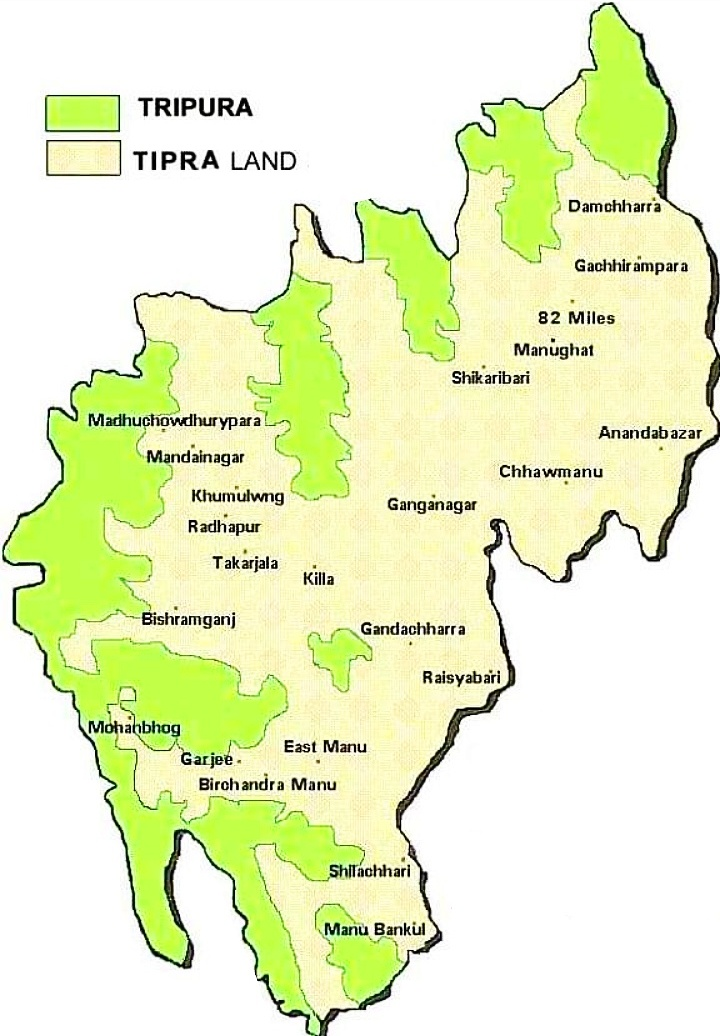
Proposed Tipraland state map

Tipraland is the name of a proposed state in India for the indigenous Tripuri people in the tribal areas of the Tripura state. They demand the Tripura Tribal Areas Autonomous District Council and some surrounding areas to be made into a separate state from Tripura. The proposed state covers 68% of the total geographical area of the Tripura and is home to over one-third of the total population of Tripura.

There is also a demand for a "Greater Tipraland" by adding Tripuris dominant areas outside the TTAADC and creation of development council for Tripuris living in other Indian states.

== Background ==
The formation of "Tipraland", a state within the Tripura Tribal Areas, under articles 2 and 3 of the Indian Constitution is demanded by a political party called the Indigenous People's Front of Tripura (IPFT) as one of their political agenda. Another registered regional political party Tipraland State Party (TSP) also demanding the same demand of Tipraland. The Kingdom of Tripura is a former kingdom which was ruled by 184 Tripuri/Tipra kings. The first king of the Manikya Dynasty of Tripura was Maha Manikya, who ruled the kingdom in the early 15th century. The earlier kings are partly mythological and partly legendary or semi-legendary. The second last king was Maharaja Bir Bikram Kishore Debbarman Manikya Bahadur. After his death in 1947, Tipra kingdom joined India as a C-Model State on 15 October 1949 under the name Tripura, and later achieved statehood on 21 January 1972. On 18 January 1982 the Tripura Tribal Areas Autonomous District Council was established.

== Tripura Tribal Areas Autonomous District Council ==
The indigenous Tipra people demanded an autonomous district council, which they finally achieved on 23 March 1979 which is known as Tripura Tribal Areas Autonomous District Council (TTAADC). The politically important TTAADC constitutes two-thirds of Tripura's 10,491 km^{2} area, which has 12,16,465 (mostly tribals) of the state's 37 lakh population residing in it. Tribal Welfare Department (Government of Tripura) strictly monitoring the implementation of the Tripura Scheduled Castes and Scheduled Tribes Reservation Act, 1991 (As amended up to February 2006) for departmental promotion / direct recruitment in all Government Departments / PSUs and local bodies. For admission in schools / colleges, allotment of seats in Medical / Engineering and other Technical and General Courses, 31% reservation for ST is strictly followed. Schedule Tribes in Tripura are exempted from income tax.

== Demographics ==
Linguistic groups in TTAADAC (2011)
1. Tripuri (83.4%)
2. Bengali (16.2%)
3. Others (0.40%)

The population of the TTAADC area is 1,216,465 out of which the Scheduled Tribes are 1,021,560, i.e. 83.4% of the population in the TTAADC area.

Historically, the Hindu rulers of Manikya dynasty of Tripura had always encouraged the immigration of and settlement of non-tribals, especially Bengalis, to Tripura. The Rajmala authenticates the fact that Ratna Manikya (1462-1487) was the first to ‘settle 4000 Bengalis in four places’ in Tripura. During Noakhali riots in 1946 many Bengali Hindu survivors, referred to as East Bengali Refugees, were sheltered in temporary relief camps in Comilla, Chandpur, Agartala the present capital of Tripura and other places. A large migration of Bengali Hindus and Muslims took place in Assam, Meghalaya, Tripura and other places during Bangladesh Liberation War on 1971.

Demographic Trends of Tripura up till 1971 as per Census Report 2001, Department of Tribal Affairs, Government of Tripura
Year	Total Population	Non-Tribal Population	Tribal Population	Percentage of Tribal Population	Percentage of Non-Tribal Population
1901	173,325	81,646	91,679	52.89%	47.11%
1911	229,613	119,484	110,129	47.96%	52.04%
1921	304,437	137,937	166,500	54.67%	45.31%
1931	382,450	179,123	203,327	53.16%	46.84%
1941	513,010	256,019	256,991	50.09%	49.91%
1951	639,029	401,071	237,958	37.23%	62.77%
1961	1,142,005	781,935	360,070	31.53%	68.47%
1971	1,556,342	1,105,796	450,544	28.95%	71.05%

== See also ==
- Tripuri nationalism
