= Rajesh Tripura =

Tripura politician

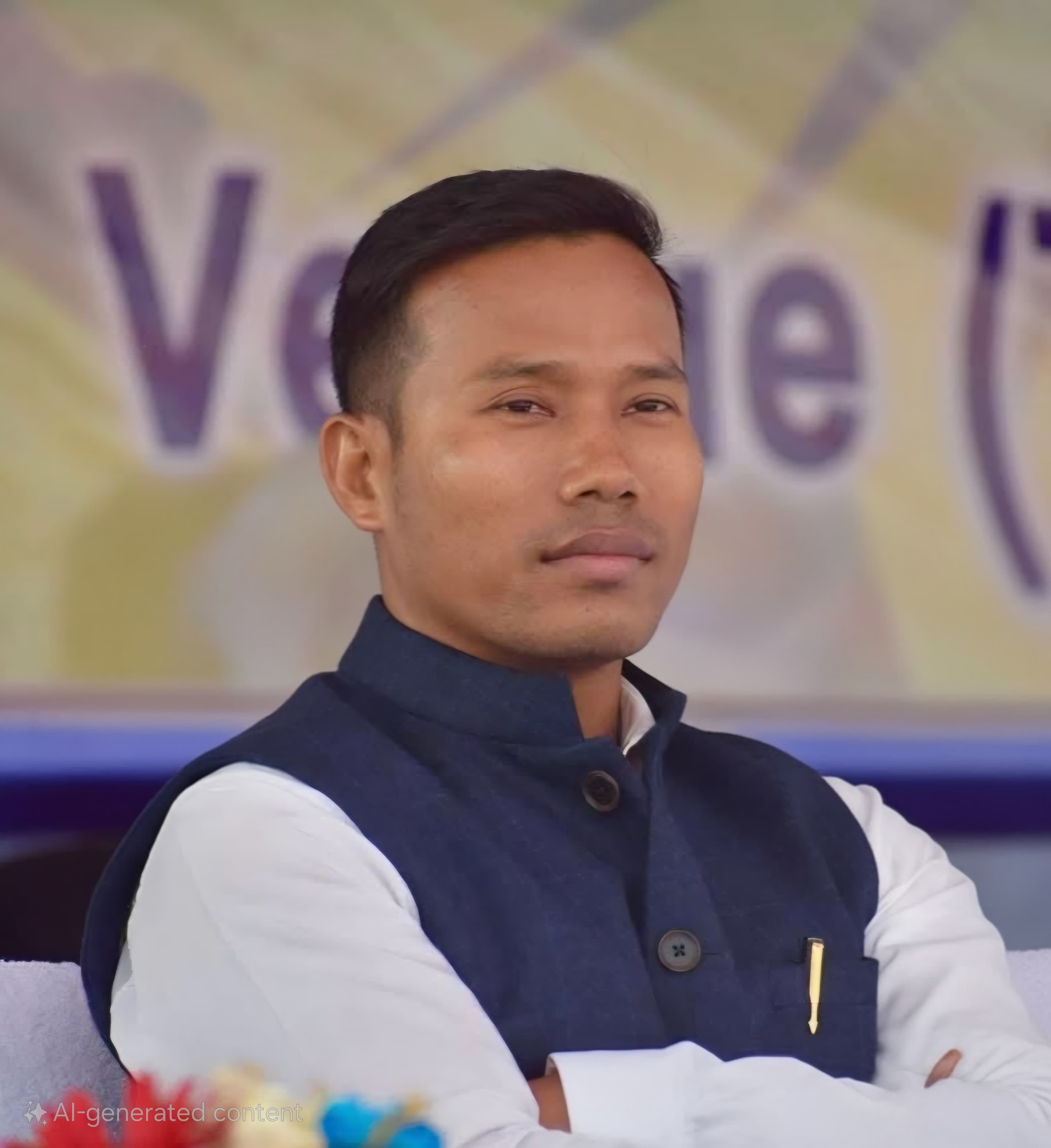
- Rajesh Tripura in 2025

Executive Member of Tripura Tribal Areas Autonomous District Council
- Incumbent
- Assumed office 2021
- Departments: ARDD; Fisheries
- Constituency: Raima Valley constituency

Personal details
- Citizenship: India
- Party: The Indigenous Progressive Regional Alliance

Rajesh Tripura is an Indian politician and elected member of the Tripura Tribal Areas Autonomous District Council (TTAADC). Rajesh was elected from the Raima Valley constituency in Dhalai district.
