= Bhaba Ranjan Reang =

Tripura politician

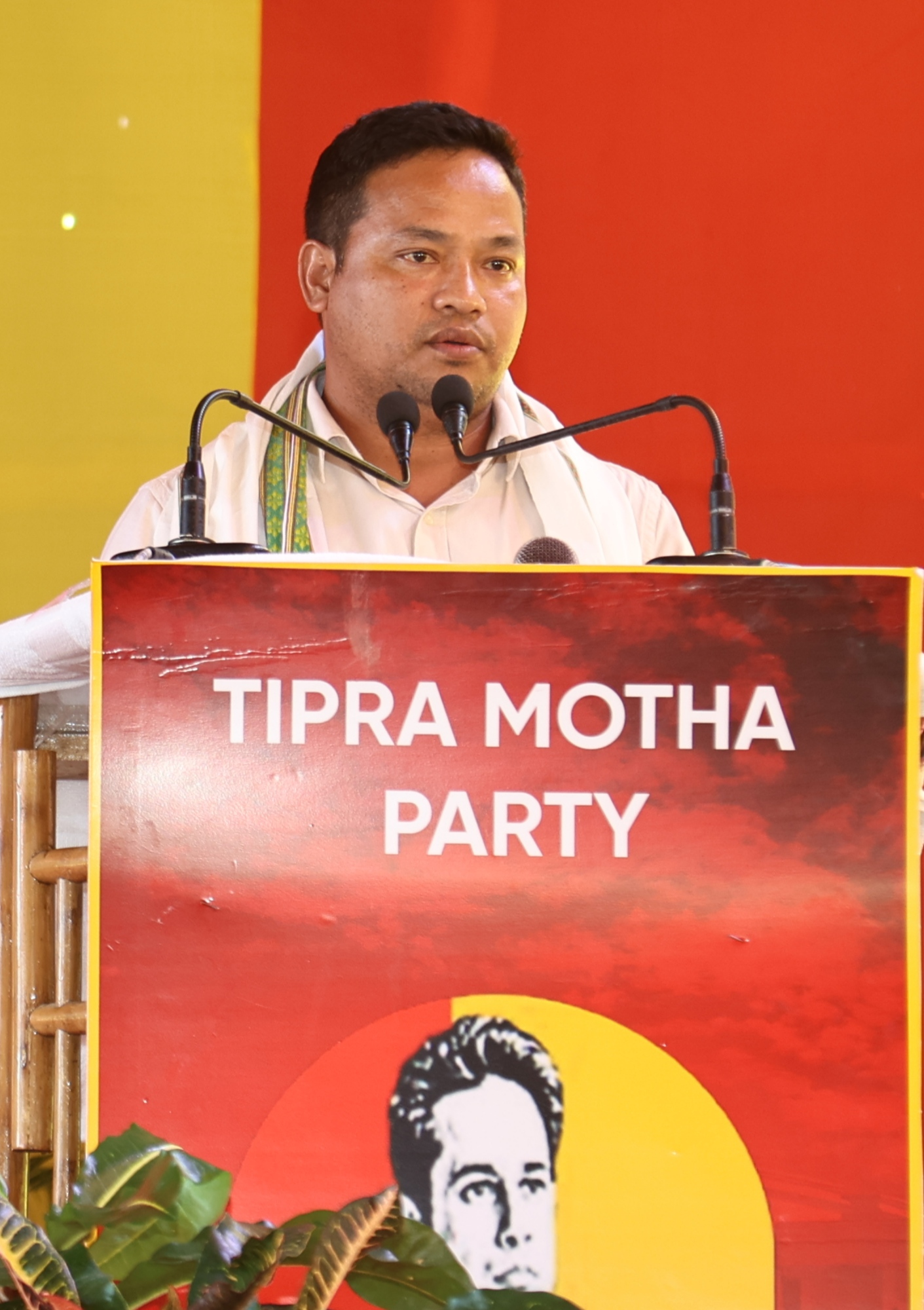

Chairman of Tripura Tribal Areas Autonomous District Council
- Incumbent
- Assumed office 6 May 2026
- Preceded by: Jagadish Debbarma

Executive Member of Tripura Tribal Areas Autonomous District Council
- In office 20 April 2021 – 5 May 2026
- Department: Agriculture & Horticulture; Forests; LRS

Member of District Tripura Tribal Areas Autonomous District Council
- Incumbent
- Assumed office 19 April 2021
- Preceded by: Rajendra Reang
- Constituency: 1- Damcherra-Jampui (ST)

Personal details
- Born: 8 January 1987 (age 39)
- Citizenship: Tripura, India
- Party: The Indigenous Progressive Regional Alliance, Tipra Motha Party
- Education: North-Eastern Hill University

Bhaba Ranjan Reang (born 8 january 1987) is an Indian politician and elected Member Of District Council and the current Chairman of the Tripura Tribal Areas Autonomous District Council (TTAADC). Reang was elected from the 1-Damcherra-Jampui constituency in North Tripura district. Previously he was an Executive Member of the council with Agriculture & Horticulture, Forests, LRS. Currently he is the Chairman of council.
