= National Conference of Tripura =

- Abbreviation: NCT
- Leader: Animesh Debbarma
- President: Animesh Debbarma
- Chairman: Rajesh Kumar Debbarma
- Secretary: Kripajay Reang
- Founder: Animesh Debbarma and Rabindra Kishore Debbaram
- Founded: December 2006
- Preceded by: INPT and GMP
- Merged into: Indigenous Nationalist Party of Twipra
- Headquarters: Vill-Rabicharan Chaudhry Para, PO-Rajnagar;PS-Khowai, Tripura India
- Membership: 310 (2015)
- Ideology: uplift the living standard of the Tripuri living in the hilly area; Tripuri nationalism
- Political position: Third Central in TTADC
- Colours
- ECI status: Regional Party
- Alliance: Tripura Regional Front
- Seats in Tripura Legislative Assembly: 0 / 60
- Seats in Tripura Tribal Area Autonomous District Council: 0 / 30

Election symbol
- Cup&Saucer

The National Conference of Tripura (NCT) was a regional political party of the state of Tripura, India formed in December 2006 at Darjeelingpara in Teliamura. It was formed by Rabindra Kishore Debbarma, formerly of the GMP of the Communist Party of India (Marxist) (CPIM) in Tripura, and Animesh Debbarma of Indigenous Nationalist Party of Twipra (INPT). The NCT included many disaffected members of the Twipra Students Union, the Tribal Youth Federation and the GMP of the CPIM party in Tripura, and leaders from INPT. The NCT contested the 2013 state elections but did not win any seats. However, on 14 March 2020 it merged with the Indigenous Nationalist Party of Twipra.

== Election in Tripura State Legislative Assembly 2018 ==
=== Contesting Candidates ===
- Animesh Debbarma at 24-Ramchandraghat (ST)
- Rajesh Kumar at 26-Asharambari (ST)
- Kripajay Reang at 29-Krishnapur (ST)

== Prominent Leaders and Spokesperson ==
- Animesh Debbarma is a former MLA of Tripura Legislative Assembly from Pramodnagar Constituency 2003 to 2008 who was an ex-spokesperson of Indigenous Nationalist People of Twipra(INPT) and prominent chief leader of the National Conference of Tripura
- Kripajay Reang is a former member of INPT as well as the contesting candidate for INPT in 2003 .He is the current Secretary-General of NCT and the main spokesperson of NCT in Tripura Tribal Areas Autonomous District Council

== Contesting Candidates in Tripura Legislative Assembly 2018 ==
-	LS No.	Constituency	LS Type	Candidate	Vote	Result	Poll no
1	24	Ramchandraghat	ST	Animesh Debbarma		Lost	18 February 2018
2	26	Asharambar	ST	Rajesh Kr. Debbarma	4321	Lost	18 February 2018
3	29	Krishnapur	ST	Kripajay Reang	342	Lost	18 February 2018
