= Radhacharan Debbarma =

Indian politician

Radha Charan Debbarma
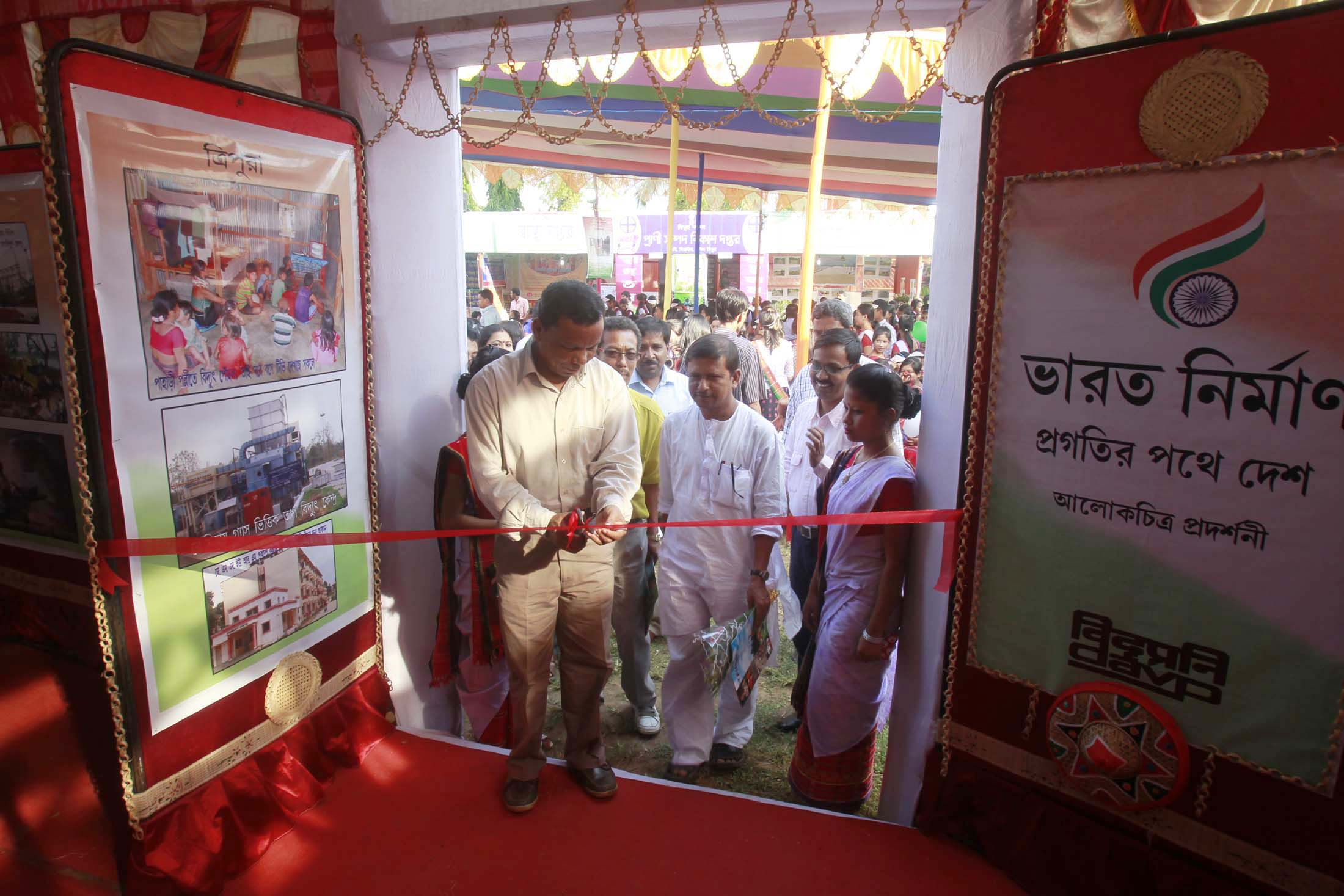
- Radhacharan Debbarma inaugurating an exhibition

Chief Executive Member of Tripura Tribal Areas Autonomous District Council
- In office 17 May 2015 – 17 May 2020
- Governor: Padmanabha Acharya; Tathagata Roy; Kaptan Singh Solanki; Ramesh Bais
- Preceded by: Ranjit Debbarma
- Succeeded by: Governor's rule

Member of District Council in Tripura Tribal Areas Autonomous District Council
- In office 2005–2015
- Constituency: Jirania

Leader of Opposition in Tripura Tribal Areas Autonomous District Council
- In office 2000–2005

Executive Member of Tripura Tribal Areas Autonomous District Council
- In office 1995–2000

Personal details
- Born: 10 January 1963 (age 63) Mandwi, Tripura, India
- Citizenship: India
- Party: Communist Party of India (Marxist)
- Children: 2
- Education: Maharaja Bir Bikram College (B.A); Calcutta University (M.A-History)

Radha Charan Debbarma (born 10 January 1963) is an Indian politician who served as the Chief Executive Member of Tripura Tribal Areas Autonomous District Council from May 2015 to May 2020. He is a member of Communist Party of India (Marxist) and the current General Secretary of GMP the tribal wing of the party. Debbarma was Executive Member of TTAADC from 2005 to 2015. Debbarma's term expired on 17 May 2020 and following the postponement of elections a result of the global coronavirus pandemic, TTAADC is currently under Governor's rule.

== Early life ==
Radha Charan Debbarma hails from Mandai under Jirania Sub-division. He was born in a lower-middle-class family in Mandwi, West Tripura district, Tripura. Debbarma was very active in student movements in his student days. He was also General Secretary of Tribal Student's Union. He completed his graduation from Maharaja Bir Bikram College.

== Political career ==
Debbarma was interested in politics in his early life. In 1995, TTAADC election for the first time he was elected from Jirania constituency by CPI(M) ticket and became Executive Member. He served as Leader of Opposition in TTAADC from 2000 to 2005, when the CPI(M) government was defeated by IPFT. In 2005, he was elected from Jirania (TTAADC Constituency) and became Executive Member of TTAADC. In 2015 Tripura Tribal Areas Autonomous District Council election Debbarma won the election with 13,151 votes and he formed his Government in TTAADC. Debbarma took oath as Chief Executive Member of TTAADC on 17 May 2015.

== Chief Executive Member of TTAADC ==
=== Taking office ===
Radhacharan served as Executive Member for three terms (1995–2000 and 2005–2015). In 2015 Tripura Tribal Areas Autonomous District Council election he won his seat by a margin of 8901 votes. He was sworn in as Chief Executive Member on 17 May 2015.

=== Development projects ===
The Jamatia Customary Law (total 313 sections and 30 chapters) passed in TTAADC in September 2017 and Debbarma formally handed over the law to "Hoda Okra", the heads of Jamatia community, on 16 September 2017 in a mass gathering at Khumulwng.

As Chief Executive Member, Debbarma favored to develop the language, culture, land and economy of the indigenous tribal communities. He distributed Auto-Trucks to 45 unemployed tribal youths for reducing the unemployment ratings from Tripura through the "Sikla Ham Malkhung scheme"(Youth Development Vehicle) on 7 Feb. 2020.

== See also ==
- Aghore Debbarma
- Jitendra Choudhury
- Tripura Tribal Areas Autonomous District Council

Political offices
Preceded by Ranjit Debbarma	Chief Executive Member of TTAADC; 2015–2020	Succeeded by Governor's rule
