= Indigenous Nationalist Party of Twipra =

- Abbreviation: INPT
- Leader: Bijoy Kumar Hrangkhawl
- President: Bijoy Kumar Hrangkhawl
- Chairperson: Jagadish Debbarma
- Secretary: Jagadish Debbarma
- Founder: Bijoy Kumar Hrangkhawl
- Founded: 2002
- Dissolved: 11 June 2021
- Split from: Tripura Upajati Juba Samiti
- Preceded by: Tripura National Volunteers
- Merged into: The Indigenous Progressive Regional Alliance
- Headquarters: Pragati Road, krishnagar, Agartala-799100,Tripura, India
- Youth wing: Indigenous Youth Federation of Twipra
- Ideology: Tripuri nationalism
- Political position: Centre
- Colours
- ECI status: Regional Party
- Seats in: 0 / 60 (Tripura Legislative Assembly)
- Seats in: 02 / 30 (Tripura Tribal Areas Autonomous District Council)

Election symbol
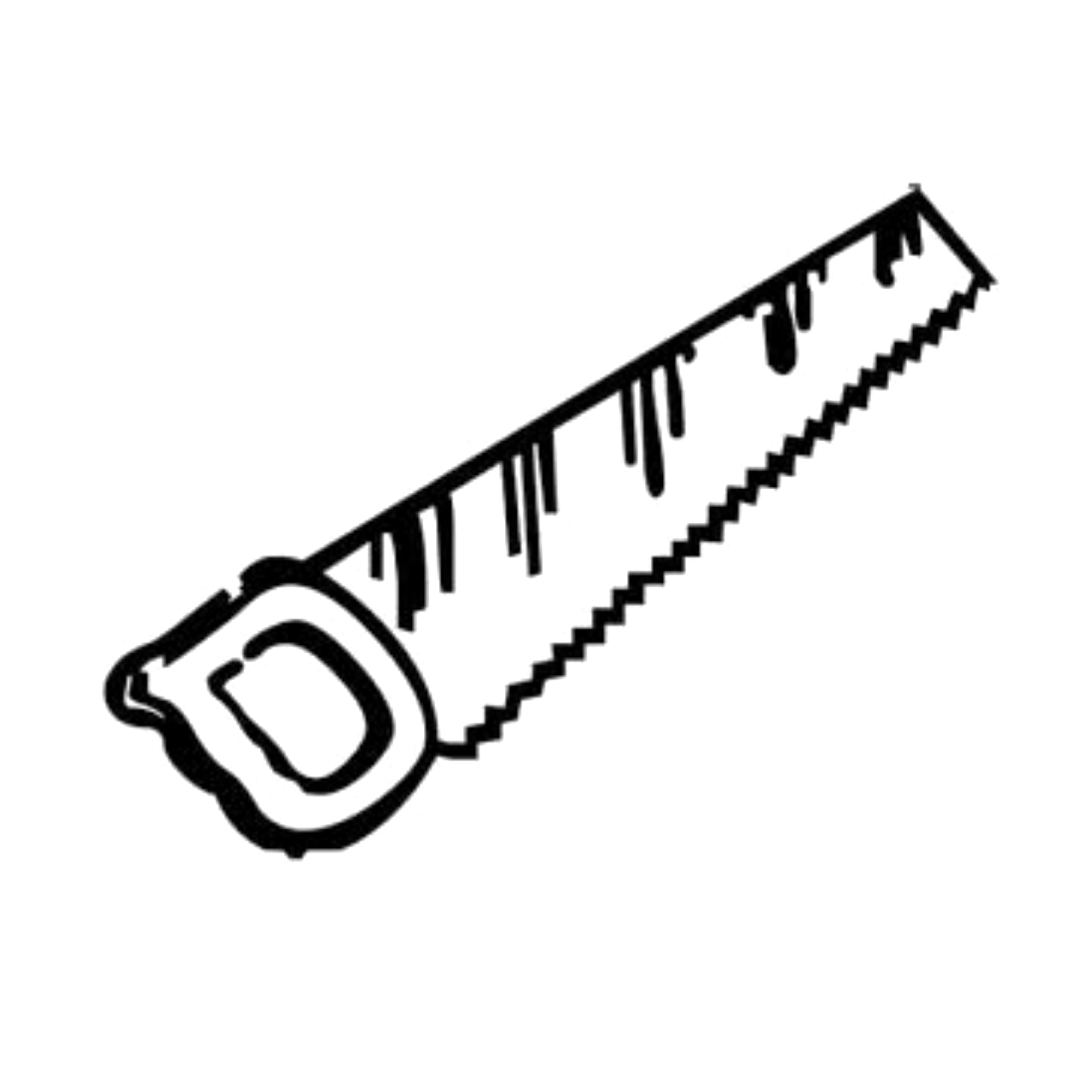

Party flag

Website
- www.inpt/tripura.com

The Indigenous Nationalist Party of Twipra (abbr. INPT) was a political party in the Indian state of Tripura between 2002 and 2021. Bijoy Kumar Hrangkhawl was the president of the party. It merged with the Tipraha Indigenous Progressive Alliance (TIPRA) party on 11 June 2021.

== History ==
The INPT was formed as a merger of the Indigenous People's Front of Tripura and the Tripura Upajati Juba Samiti in 2002.

The formation of the INPT was pushed through after pressure from the underground National Liberation Front of Tripura, who wanted to unite all tribal nationalist forces in a single party. The INPT was commonly and wrongly perceived as the political wing of NLFT.

== Prominent politicians ==
- Bijoy Kumar Hrangkhawl, former militant chief of Tripura National Volunteers
- Jagadish Debbarma, former chairman of the TTAADC from 1990 to 1995
- Shyama Charan Tripura

== Past results ==
=== TTAADC ===
As IPFT had a majority in the Tripura Tribal Areas Autonomous District Council, INPT came to govern that institution until 2003.

INPT suffered a serious setback in the summer of 2003, when a group of TTAAADC members under the leadership of Hiren Tripura broke away and formed the National Socialist Party of Tripura. One high-ranking INPT leader, Shyamcharan Tripura, took the side of the dissidents. NSPT were able to, with support from the Communist Party of India (Marxist) (CPI(M)) members in TTAADC, to win a majority in the assembly and INPT formed the opposition.

=== Tripura State Legislative Assembly ===
In the state assembly elections in 2003 INPT was allied with the Indian National Congress. INPT launched 18 candidates and Congress 42. Six INPT candidates were elected, and in total the party received 189 186 votes. The elections were won by the Left Front. After the 12th Assembly Election held in 2018, INPT has no representatives in the Tripura State Legislative Assembly.

=== Lok Sabha (parliamentary elections) ===
Ahead of the Lok Sabha elections in 2004 INPT joined the Bharatiya Janata Party (BJP)-led National Democratic Alliance. INPT supported the Nationalist Trinamool Congress and BJP candidates in the election.

== See also ==
- Tripuri nationalism
- Tripura rebellion
