= Indigenous People's Front of Tripura =

Political party in Tripura, India

- Abbreviation: IPFT
- Secretary: Prem Kumar Reang
- Spokesperson: Amit Debbarma
- Founder: Harinath Debbarma; Shyama Charan Tripura
- Headquarters: Old Kali Bari Road, Krishnanagar, Agartala - 799100 Tripura
- Youth wing: Youth IPFT
- Ideology: Tripuri nationalism Regionalism; Anti-immigration; Anti-communism
- Political position: Centre-right
- Colours: Dark green
- ECI status: Regional party
- Alliance: NDA (2018-Present)
- Seats in Tripura Legislative Assembly: 1 / 60

Election symbol
- Dao Knife

Party flag

The Indigenous People's Front of Tripura (IPFT) is a regional political party in Tripura, India. It is a member of the National Democratic Alliance and North-East Democratic Alliance. The party was merged into the Indigenous Nationalist Party of Tripura (INPT) in 2001, however diverged out in 2009. The party allied with the BJP in the 2018 Tripura Legislative Assembly election and won all eight seats it contested and got 7.5% of the total votes polled. The BJP got 36 seats and with a total of 44 seats the BJP-IPFT coalition had two-thirds majority in the Legislative Assembly. In 2023 Tripura Legislative Assembly election, despite the BJP securing a majority, IPFT won 1 seat out of the 6 it contested and secured 1.26% of the total vote share. It's only elected mla was inducted in the Second Saha ministry.

== History ==
The IPFT made its political breakthrough in the 2000 Tripura Tribal Areas Autonomous District Council (TTAADC) elections. The militant separatist organization National Liberation Front of Tripura (NLFT) had declared that it would only allow the IPFT to contest the election; in light of a series of assassinations, death threats, and kidnappings, only the Left Front and the IPFT participated. The IPFT ended up winning 17 out of 28 seats, taking a majority on the TTAADC.

The Tripura National Volunteers (TNV), a Tripuri nationalist militant group, supported the IPFT in the 2000 elections. In 2001, after pressure from the NLFT, the TNV merged with the IPFT. In 2002, the Indigenous Nationalist Party of Tripura (INPT) was formed as a merger of the IPFT and the Tripura Upajati Juba Samiti (TUJS).

The newly formed INPT formed an alliance with the Indian National Congress for the 2003 Tripura Legislative Assembly election, in which the INPT won six assembly seats.

After the 2003 assembly election, six District Councilors split away from the INPT to form the National Socialist Party of Tripura (NSPT), under the leadership of Hirendra Tripura and Budhu Kumar Debbarma. The NSPT formed a coalition government in the TTAADC in partnership with the communist CPIM party. Following this, more INPT leaders defected, leaving to join the Indian National Congress.

In 2005, another youth leader and INPT MLA Animesh Debbarma left the party to form the National Conference of Tripura (NCT).

Before the 2009 Lok Sabha election, some INPT leaders decided to revive the IPFT party under the leadership of former All India Radio Director N.C Debbarma. The main demand of the IPFT is the formation of "Tipraland", a state within the TTAADC, under articles 2 and 3 of the Indian Constitution.

The IPFT contested both of the Loksabha seats of Tripura in 2009, but received very few votes. It also contested 21 out of 28 ADC seats in the 2010 Tripura Tribal Areas Autonomous District Council election, but only received a total of 2,216 votes.

The IPFT also failed to gain a majority in the 2013 Tripura assembly elections, receiving 11,234 votes in 17 contested seats. Following these elections, IPFT leader Patal Kanya Jamatia left and joined the INPT, ultimately leaving again to form the Tripura Peoples Front (TPF).

In the 2015 ADC elections, the IPFT contested 27 of the 28 seats. Despite securing the second-highest number of votes at 115,252, the IPFT was unable to gain a single seat. The IPFT split again following these elections, with some members like Retd. TCS officer C.R Debbarma and Rangchak Kwthang leaving to form the Tipraland State Party (TSP). The party was further weakened after some prominent IPFT youth leaders, including David Murasing and Pabitra Jamatia, left the party to join the current ruling party Bharatiya Janata Party (BJP), the party in power nationally in India, on 11 December 2016, but David Murasing ultimately leaving again BJP on 16 August 2017 to form Twipra Dophani Sikla Srwngnai Motha (TDSSM).

== Splinter Factions ==
The five factions emerged out of IPFT are as follows:

- Indigenous People's Front of Tripura (Tipraha) (IPFT-T) of Aghor Debbarma, Budhu Debbarma, and Binoy Debbarma.
- Indigenous People's Front of Tripura (Balaram Debbarma) (IPFT-B) of Balaram Debbarma.
- Tripura People's Front (TPF) of Patal Kanya Jamatia.
- Tipraland State Party (TSP) of Retired TCS officer C.R Debbarma and Sonacharan Debbarma.
- Twipra Dophani Sikla Srwngnai Motha (TDSSM) of D Hamkhrai Twipra (David Murasing) also split from IPFT.

== See also ==
- Tipraland
- List of political parties in India
