= Diphu railway station =

Railway station in Assam

Diphu
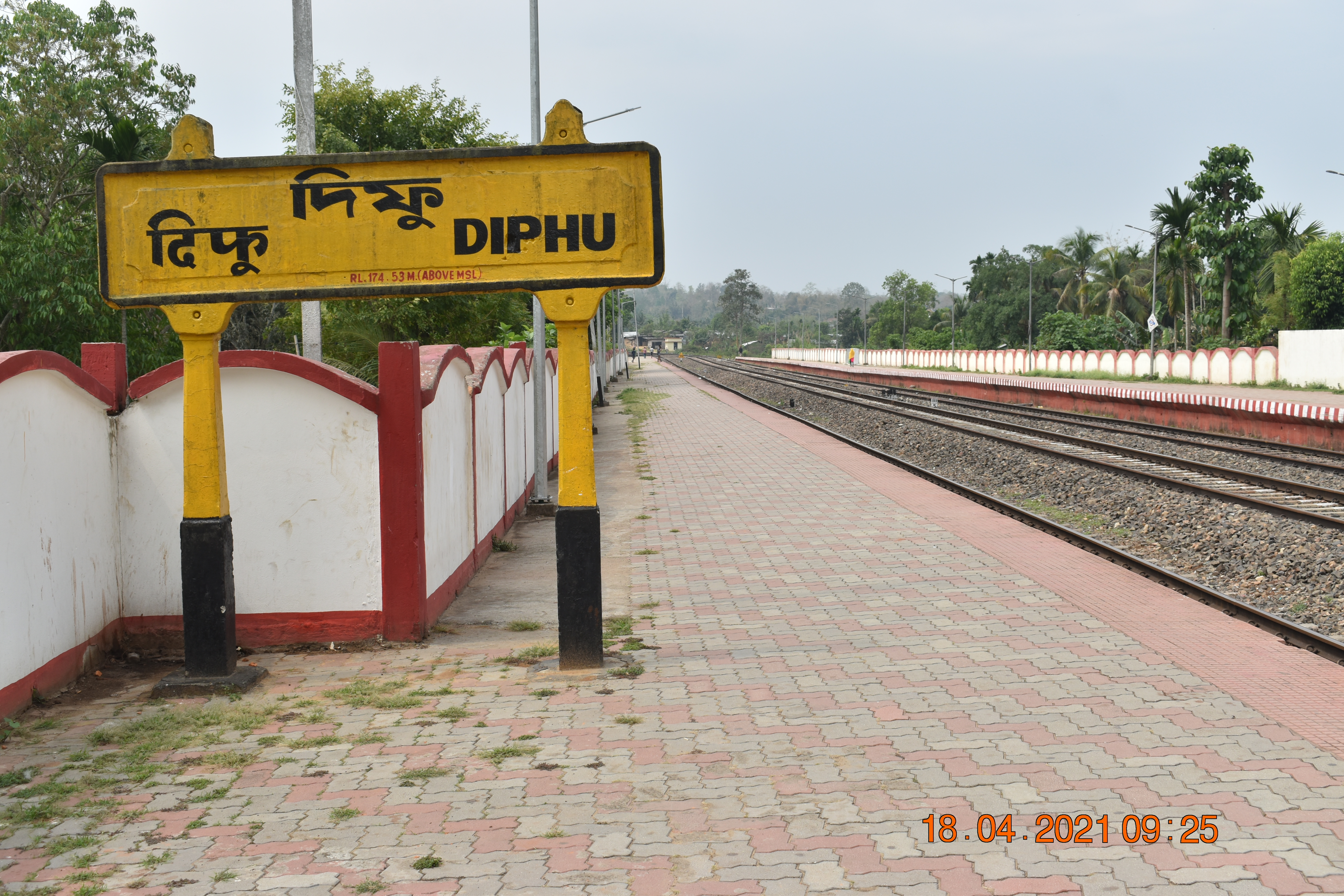
- Signboard at Diphu Train Station

General information
- Location: Diphu, Assam; India
- Coordinates: 25.8380°N 93.4386°E
- Elevation: 180 m (591 ft)
- System: Indian Railways station
- Owner: Indian Railways
- Operator: Northeast Frontier Railway
- Platforms: 2
- Tracks: 3
- Connections: Taxi Stand, Auto Stand

Construction
- Structure type: Standard (on ground station)
- Parking: Yes
- Cycle facilities: No

Other information
- Status: Functioning
- Station code: DPU
- Zone(s): Northeast Frontier Railway
- Division(s): Lumding
- Fare zone: Northeast Frontier Railway

Services
Reservation
Preceding station	Indian Railways	Following station
Nailalung towards ?	Northeast Frontier Railway zone Lumding–Dibrugarh section	Daldali towards ?
Location
- Location within Assam Location within India

Diphu Railway Station (Station Code: DPU) is the main railway station of Diphu town, headquarter of Karbi Anglong district in Assam.

== Station ==
It is under Lumding railway division of Northeast Frontier Railway zone of Indian Railways. It is located on Lumding–Dibrugarh section main line of the Indian Railways.

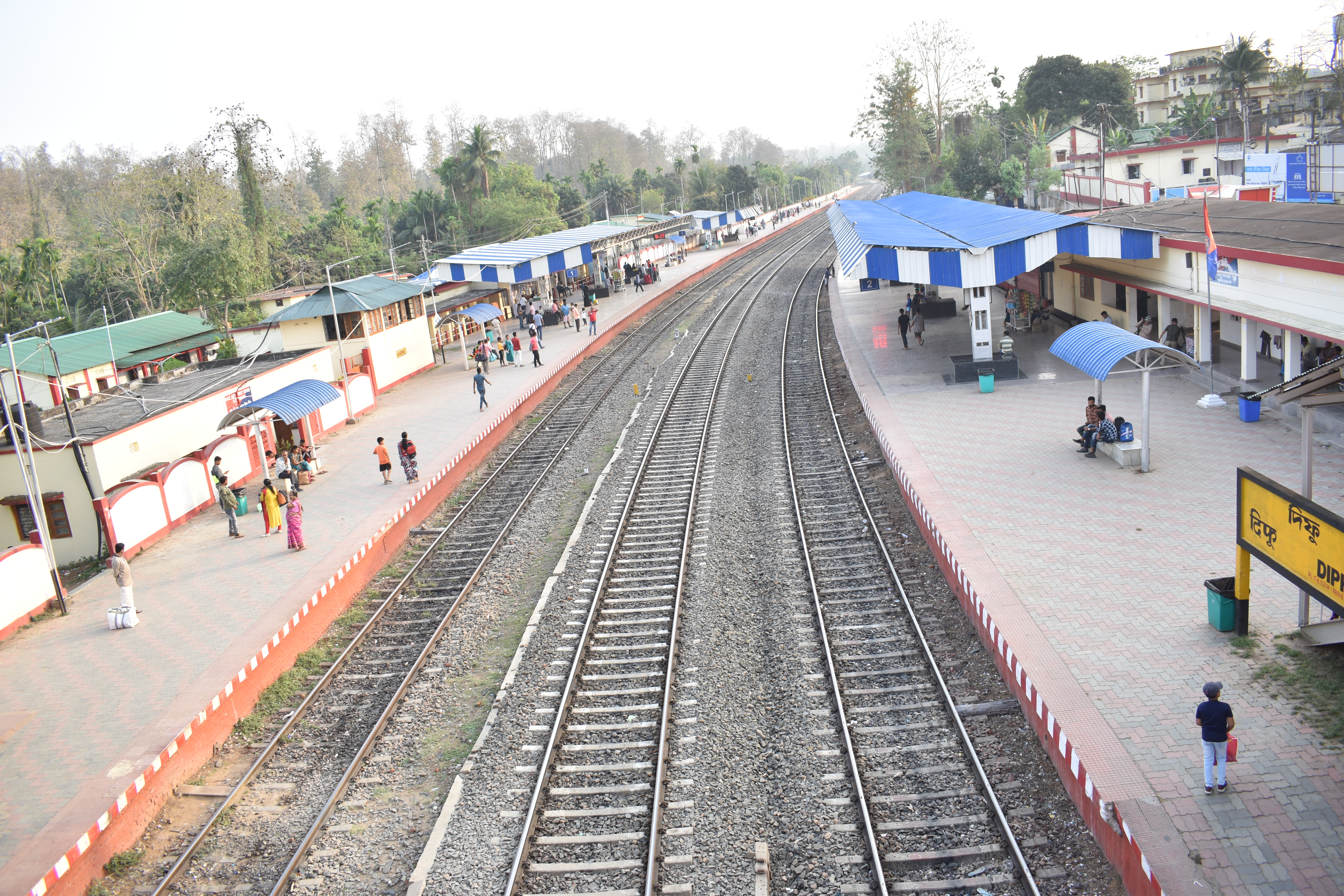
Platform No.1 & No.2 (L-to-R)

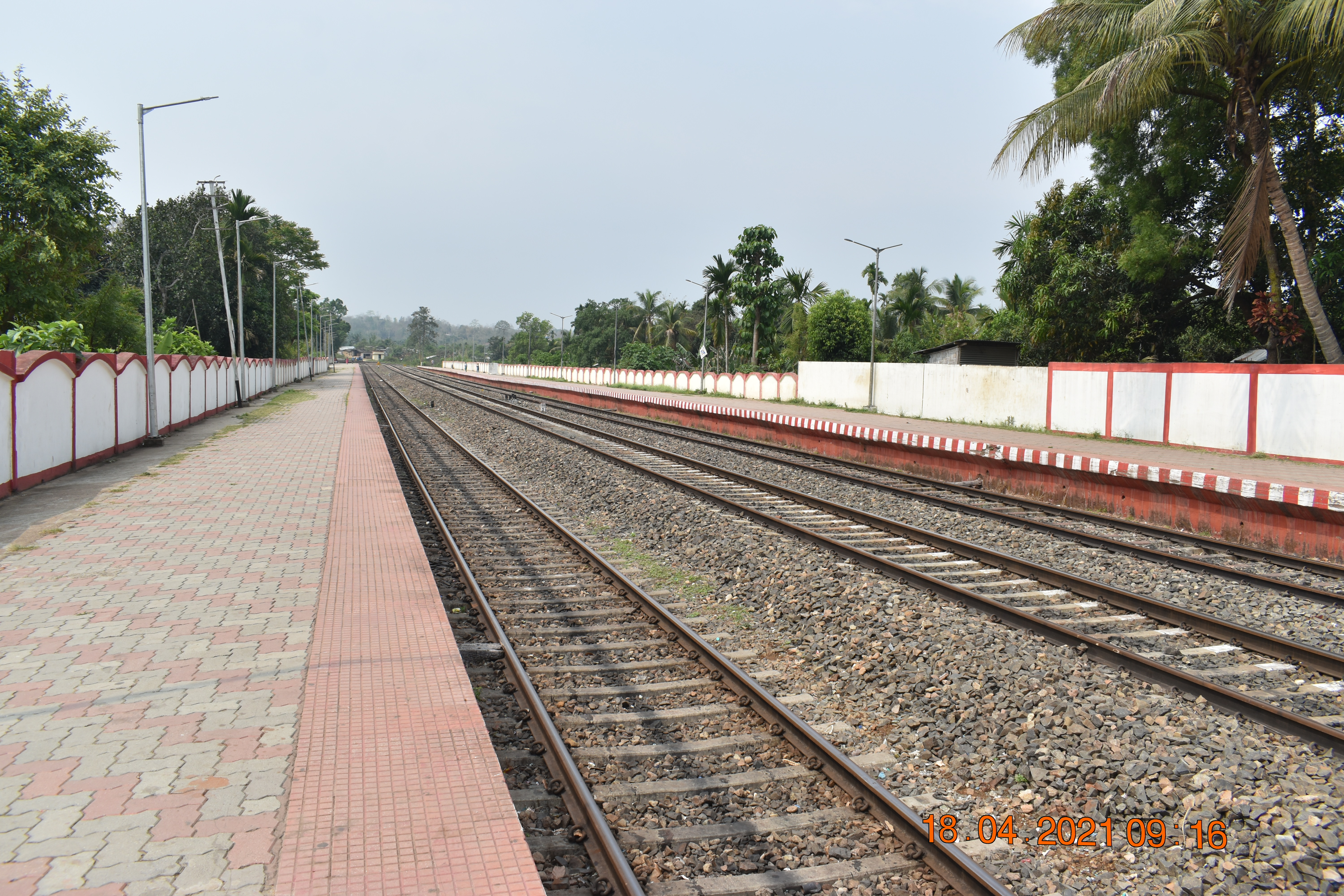
Station Platform (West end)

== Transport ==
The station has Auto rickshaw stand and is the main mode of transportation in the town. Several bus stations including a district owned KABA, state owned ASTC, and few private owned, ie- Kareng Travels, is within a minute walk from station gate. Taxi is available at the gate.

== Important trains ==
The following important trains halt at Diphu railway station:

- 12423/12424 New Delhi – Dibrugarh Town Rajdhani Express
- 15906/15907 Dibrugarh–Kanyakumari Vivek Express
- 12067/12068 Guwahati–Jorhat Town Jan Shatabdi Express
- 15904/15905 Dibrugarh–Chandigarh Express
- 15909/15910 Dibrugarh–Lalgarh Avadh Assam Express
- 15959/15960 Dibrugarh–Howrah Kamrup Express via Guwahati
- 15645/15646 Dibrugarh–Lokmanya Tilak Terminus Superfast Express
- 15933/15934 New Tinsukia–Amritsar Express
- 15670/15669 Guwahati–Dibrugarh Town Nagaland Express
- 13281/13282 Dibrugarh–Rajendra Nagar Weekly Express
- 15665/15666 Guwahati–Mariani BG Express
- 22502/22503 New Tinsukia–SMVT Bengaluru Superfast Express
- 15641/15642 Silchar–New Tinsukia Barak Brahmaputra Express
- 15617/15618 Naharlagun–Shokhüvi Donyi Polo Express
