= Dibrugarh–Gomti Nagar Amrit Bharat Express =

Amrit Bharat Express train route in India

Dibrugarh – Gomti Nagar Amrit Bharat Express
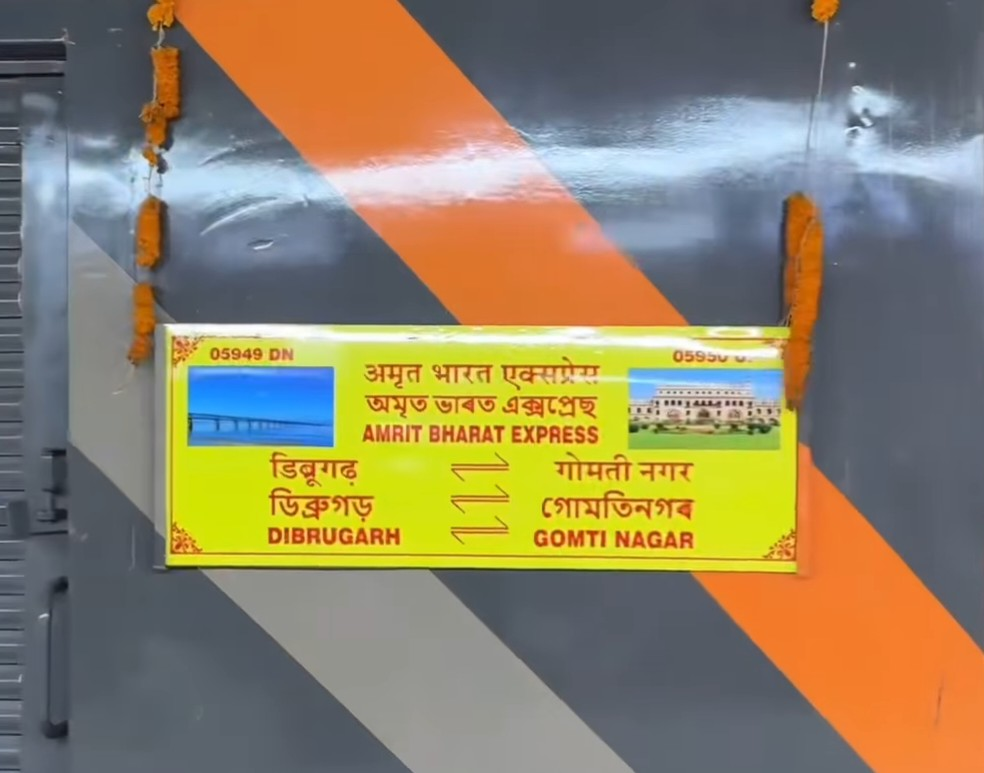

Overview
- Service type: Amrit Bharat Express, Superfast
- Status: Active
- Locale: Assam, Nagaland, West Bengal, Uttar Pradesh and Bihar
- First service: 17 January 2026; 3 months ago (Inaugural); 30 January 2026; 2 months ago (Commercial)
- Current operator: Northeast Frontier Railways (NFR)

Route
- Termini: Dibrugarh (DBRG); Gomti Nagar (GTNR)
- Stops: 42
- Distance travelled: 1,755 km (1,091 mi)
- Average journey time: 40 hrs 30 mins
- Service frequency: Weekly
- Train number: 15949/15950
- Lines used: Guwahati–Lumding line; Guwahati–New Bongaigaon line; New Bongaigaon–New Jalpaiguri line; Katihar–Barauni line; Barauni–Gorakhpur line Towards ( Hajipur Junction, Chhapra Junction, Siwan Junction ); Gorakhpur–Ayodhya–Gomti Nagar line

On-board services
- Class: Sleeper class coach (SL) General unreserved coach (GS)
- Seating arrangements: Yes
- Sleeping arrangements: Yes
- Auto-rack arrangements: Upper
- Catering facilities: On-board catering
- Observation facilities: Saffron-grey
- Entertainment facilities: Electric outlets; Reading lights; Bottle holder
- Other facilities: CCTV cameras; Bio-vacuum toilets; Foot-operated water taps; Passenger information system

Technical
- Rolling stock: Modified LHB coaches
- Track gauge: Indian gauge
- Electrification: 25 kV 50 Hz AC overhead line
- Operating speed: 47 km (29 mi) (Avg.)
- Track owner: Indian Railways
- Rake sharing: No

The 15949/15950 Dibrugarh–Gomti Nagar (Lucknow) Amrit Bharat Express is India's 21st non-AC Superfast Amrit Bharat Express train, which runs across the states of Assam, Nagaland, West Bengal, Bihar and Uttar Pradesh, by connecting the Tea city of India Dibrugarh with Gomti Nagar (Lucknow) the second largest metropolitan capital city of Uttar Pradesh.

The express train is inaugurated on 18 January 2026 by Honorable Prime Minister Narendra Modi through video conference.

== Overview ==
The train is operated by Indian Railways, connecting Dibrugarh and Gomti Nagar (Lucknow). It is currently operated as train number 15949/15950 on weekly basis.

== Rakes ==
It is the 21st Amrit Bharat 2.0 Express train in which the locomotives were designed by Chittaranjan Locomotive Works (CLW) at Chittaranjan, West Bengal and the coaches were designed and manufactured by the Integral Coach Factory at Perambur, Chennai under the Make in India initiative.

== Schedule ==
Train schedule: Dibrugarh ↔ Gomti Nagar Amrit Bharat Express
Train no.	Station code	Departure station	Departure time	Departure day	Arrival station	Arrival hours
15949	DBRG	Dibrugarh	9:00 PM	Gomti Nagar	1:30 PM	40h 30m
15950	GTNR	Gomti Nagar	6:40 PM	Dibrugarh	12:40 AM	42h 0m

== Routes and halts ==
Route and halts of Dibrugarh–Gomti Nagar Amrit Bharat Express :
15949 DBRG → GTNR	15950 GTNR → DBRG
Dibrugarh	Gomti Nagar
Moranhat	Barabanki Junction
Simaluguri Junction	Ayodhya Cantt Junction
Mariani Junction	Ayodhya Dham Junction
Dimapur	Basti
Diphu	Khalilabad
Lumding Junction	Gorakhpur Junction
Hojai	Deoria Sadar
Chaparmukh Junction	Siwan Junction
Jagiroad	Chhapra Junction
Guwahati	Sonpur Junction
Kamakhya Junction	Hajipur Junction
Rangiya Junction	Barauni Junction
Nalbari	Begusarai
Barpeta Road	Khagaria Junction
New Bongaigaon Junction	Naugachia
Kokrajhar	Katihar Junction
New Alipurduar	Barsoi Junction
New Cooch Behar	Kishanganj
New Jalpaiguri Junction	Aluabari Road Junction
Aluabari Road Junction	New Jalpaiguri Junction
Kishanganj	New Cooch Behar
Barsoi Junction	New Alipurduar
Katihar Junction	Kokrajhar
Naugachia	New Bongaigaon Junction
Khagaria Junction	Barpeta Road
Begusarai	Nalbari
Barauni Junction	Rangiya Junction
Hajipur Junction	Kamakhya Junction
Sonpur Junction	Guwahati
Chhapra Junction	Jagiroad
Siwan Junction	Chaparmukh Junction
Deoria Sadar	Hojai
Gorakhpur Junction	Lumding
Khalilabad	Diphu
Basti	Dimapur
Ayodhya Dham Junction	Mariani Junction
Ayodhya Cantt Junction	Simaluguri Junction
Barabanki Junction	Moranhat
Gomti Nagar	Dibrugarh

== Coach composition ==
Coach Composition
Category	Coaches	Total
SLRD (Divyangjan coach)	SLRD, SLRD	2
General unreserved (GEN)	GEN1, GEN2, GEN3, GEN4, GEN5, GEN6, GEN7	7
Sleeper class (SL)	S8, S7, S6, S5, S4, S3, S2, S1	8
Pantry car (PC)	PC	1
General unreserved (GEN)	GEN8, GEN9, GEN10, GEN11, GEN12	5
SLRD (Divyangjan coach)	SLRD	1
Total coaches		22

== See also ==
- Amrit Bharat Express
- Vande Bharat Express
- Vande Bharat Slepper
- Dibrugarh
- Gomti Nagar (Lucknow)

== Notes ==
a. Runs a day in a week with both directions.
