= Mariani Junction railway station =

Railway station in Assam

Mariani Junction
- Concourse at Mariani Junction railway station

General information
- Location: Dhodar Ali Road, Mariani, Jorhat, Assam; India
- Coordinates: 26°39′11″N 94°18′32″E
- Elevation: 117 metres (384 ft)
- System: Indian Railways junction station
- Owner: Indian Railways
- Operator: Northeast Frontier Railway
- Lines: Lumding–Dibrugarh section Furkating–Jorhat–Mariani branch line
- Platforms: 3
- Tracks: 5

Construction
- Structure type: Standard broad gauge
- Parking: Yes
- Cycle facilities: Yes
- Accessible: Disabled access

Other information
- Status: Functioning
- Station code: MXN
- Zone(s): Northeast Frontier Railway zone
- Division(s): Tinsukia

History
- Closed: No
- Rebuilt: Yes (MG Station to BG Station)

Services
Location
- Location within Assam Location within India

Mariani Junction Railway Station is the major railway junction of Jorhat district in the Indian state of Assam on the Lumding–Dibrugarh section. It serves Jorhat city, Mariani and its surrounding area as well. The railway station is located at a distance of 18 km (11 mi) from Jorhat city.

- New Construction: EMD Diesel Locomotive Shed for 50 locomotives.
- Zonal Number (for its Trains) = 159XX

== Amenities ==
Mariani junction has three platforms, two double-bedded retiring rooms, computerized railway reservation system, parking facilities, vegetarian food stalls and free high speed Google RailWire WiFi.

== Mariani diesel locomotive shed ==
NFR's upcoming second fully-fledged state of art dedicated EMD locomotive shed. With an aim to further upgrade the maintenance of diesel locomotives in the North Eastern region and to ease the pressure faced by the New Guwahati Diesel Locomotive Shed, the Indian Railways is now coming up with two more such sheds in Assam, which will be located at Mariani. A diesel locomotive shed is being constructed after being removed out of Railway Quarters and used to handle 50 EMD WDP4Ds & WDG4Ds Dual Cab locomotives, which have a range of 4,500 horsepower. There will be around 500 personnel, including engineers and artisans, in both the upcoming sheds. Afterwards, Tinsukia Division will have its own locomotive shed, as presently it has trip sheds. After that, Northeast Frontier Railway will get its fourth locomotive shed, the second locomotive shed in Assam after the New Guwahati shed, to ease pressure on Malda Town locomotive shed, Siliguri locomotive shed, and New Guwahati locomotive shed. The expected completion and commission is March 2018.

== Major trains ==
1. New Delhi–Dibrugarh Rajdhani Express (Via New Tinsukia)
2. New Delhi–Dibrugarh Rajdhani Express (Via Moranhat)
3. Dibrugarh–Kanyakumari Vivek Express
4. New Tinsukia–Amritsar Express
5. Dibrugarh–Chandigarh Express
6. New Tinsukia–SMVT Bengaluru Superfast Express
7. Dibrugarh–Lalgarh Avadh Assam Express
8. Dibrugarh–Lokmanya Tilak Terminus Superfast Express
9. Dibrugarh–Howrah Kamrup Express via Guwahati
10. Dibrugarh–Rajendra Nagar Weekly Express
11. Guwahati–Jorhat Town Jan Shatabdi Express
12. Guwahati–Dibrugarh Town Nagaland Express
13. Jorhat Town–Tinsukia Passenger
14. Guwahati–Mariani BG Express
15. Tinsukia–Lumding DEMU Express
16. Guwahati–Ledo Intercity Express
17. Rangiya–New Tinsukia Express
18. Silchar–New Tinsukia Barak Brahmaputra Express
19. Dibrugarh-Gomti Nagar Amrit Bharat Express

== See also ==
- North Eastern Railway Connectivity Project
- North Western Railway zone

| Preceding station | Indian Railways | Following station |
|---|---|---|
| Terminus | Northeast Frontier Railway zone Lumding–Dibrugarh section | Nakachari towards ? |
| Terminus | Northeast Frontier Railway zone Furkating–Jorhat–Mariani branch line | Cinnamara towards ? |
