= Furkating Junction railway station =

Railway station in Assam, India

Furkating Junction

General information
- Location: SH - 34, Furkating, Golaghat, Assam; India
- Coordinates: 26°27′56″N 94°00′10″E
- Elevation: 101 metres (331 ft)
- System: Indian Railways junction station
- Owner: Indian Railways
- Operator: Northeast Frontier Railway
- Lines: Lumding–Dibrugarh section Furkating–Jorhat–Mariani branch line
- Platforms: 2
- Tracks: 6

Construction
- Structure type: Standard on ground
- Parking: Available
- Cycle facilities: No

Other information
- Status: Functioning
- Station code: FKG
- Zone(s): Northeast Frontier Railway
- Division(s): Tinsukia
Location
- Location within Assam Location within India

Furkating is the main railway junction in the Golaghat district in the state of Assam in India. It serves Golaghat town which is about 6 km away from here.

== History ==
The 1,000 mm (3 ft 3 3/8 in) wide metre-gauge railway track earlier laid by Assam Bengal Railway from Chittagong to Lumding was extended to Tinsukia on the Dibru–Sadiya line in 1903.

The Mariani–Furkating line was operated by Jorehaut Provincial Railway till 1943.

The project for the conversion of the Lumding–Dibrugarh section from metre gauge to 5 ft 6 in (1,676 mm) broad gauge was completed by the end of 1997.

== Amenities ==
Furkating railway station has two platforms and a double-bedded retiring room.

It is also equipped with free wifi.

== Major trains ==
1. Dibrugarh–Kanyakumari Vivek Express
2. New Tinsukia–Amritsar Express
3. Dibrugarh–Chandigarh Express
4. New Tinsukia–SMVT Bengaluru Superfast Express
5. Dibrugarh–Lalgarh Avadh Assam Express
6. Dibrugarh–Lokmanya Tilak Terminus Express
7. Dibrugarh–Howrah Kamrup Express via Guwahati
8. Dibrugarh–Rajendra Nagar Weekly Express
9. Guwahati–Jorhat Town Jan Shatabdi Express
10. Guwahati–Dibrugarh Town Nagaland Express
11. Guwahati–Mariani BG Express
12. Guwahati–Ledo Intercity Express
13. Rangiya–New Tinsukia Express

Preceding station	Indian Railways	Following station
Oating towards ?	Northeast Frontier Railway zone Lumding–Dibrugarh section	Kamarbandha Ali towards ?
Terminus	Northeast Frontier Railway zone Furkating–Mariani branch line	Golaghat towards ?
