= Hojai railway station =

Railway station in Assam

Hojai
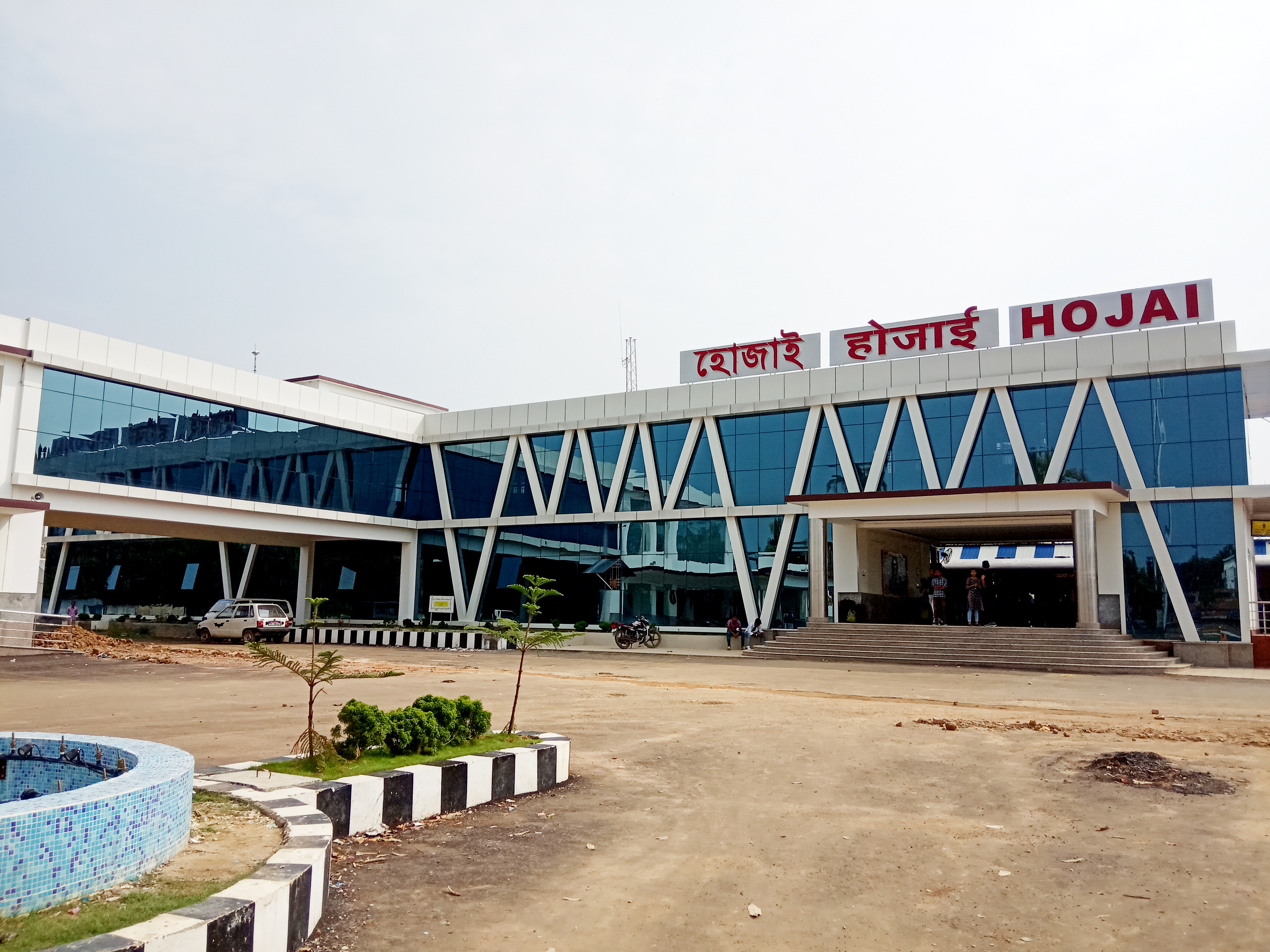
- Hojai railway station

General information
- Location: Hojai, Assam; India
- Elevation: 78 metres (256 ft)
- System: Indian Railways stations
- Owner: Indian Railways
- Operator: Northeast Frontier Railway
- Line: Guwahati–Lumding section
- Platforms: 3
- Tracks: 1 main line

Construction
- Structure type: Standard (on-ground station)
- Parking: Yes
- Cycle facilities: No

Other information
- Status: Functioning
- Station code: HJI
- Zone(s): Northeast Frontier Railway
- Division(s): Lumding
Location
- Location within Assam

Hojai railway station is a railway station in Hojai district, Assam, India. Its code is HJI. It serves Hojai town. The station consists of three platforms. The platform is well sheltered.

== Major Trains ==
1. New Delhi - Agartala Tejas Rajdhani Express
2. Agartala - Firozpur Tripura Sundari Express
3. Silchar - Thiruvananthapuram Aronai Superfast Express
4. Silchar–Coimbatore Superfast Express
5. Dibrugarh–Kanyakumari Vivek Express
6. Dibrugarh–Lalgarh Avadh Assam Express
7. Dibrugarh–Howrah Kamrup Express via Guwahati
8. Agartala–Sealdah Kanchanjunga Express
9. Dibrugarh–Lokmanya Tilak Terminus Superfast Express
10. New Tinsukia–Amritsar Express
11. Dibrugarh–Rajendra Nagar Weekly Express
12. Rangiya–Silchar Express
13. Guwahati–Dullabcherra Express
14. Guwahati–Dibrugarh Town Nagaland Express
15. Guwahati–Jorhat Town Jan Shatabdi Express
16. Guwahati–Mariani BG Express
17. Alipurduar–Lumding Intercity Express
18. Guwahati–Ledo Intercity Express
19. Rangiya–New Tinsukia Express
