= BG Express =

Guwahati–Mariani BG Express

Overview
- Service type: Express
- Locale: Assam, Nagaland
- First service: 15 August 1998; 28 years ago
- Current operator: Northeast Frontier Railway

Route
- Termini: Guwahati (GHY); Mariani (MXN)
- Stops: 12
- Distance travelled: 404 km (251 mi)
- Average journey time: 8h 45m
- Service frequency: Daily (Note: Runs seven days in a week for every direction.)
- Train number: 15665/15666

On-board services
- Classes: AC 2 tier, AC 3 tier, Sleeper class, General Unreserved
- Seating arrangements: No
- Sleeping arrangements: Yes
- Catering facilities: On-board catering E-catering
- Observation facilities: ICF coach
- Entertainment facilities: No
- Baggage facilities: No
- Other facilities: Below the seats

Technical
- Rolling stock: 2
- Track gauge: 1,676 mm (5 ft 6 in)
- Operating speed: 46 km/h (29 mph), including halts Maximumpermissible speed 110km/hr
Route map
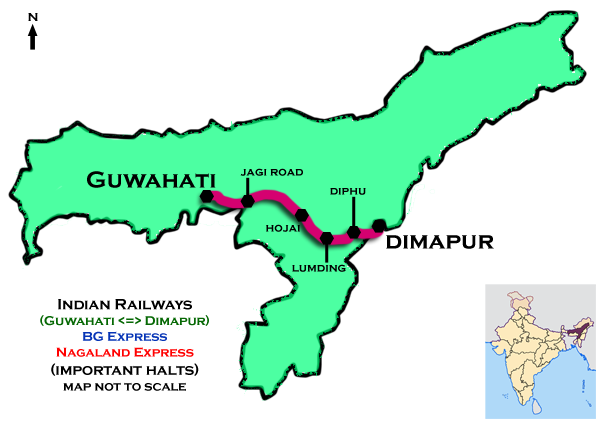

The Guwahati–Mariani BG Express is an Express train belonging to Northeast Frontier Railway zone that runs between Guwahati and Mariani in India. It is currently being operated with 15665/15666 train numbers on a daily basis. Earlier, the train ran between Guwahati and Dimapur. It was extended to Mariani Junction from 2020.

== Service ==
The 15665/Guwahati–Mariani BG Express has an average speed of 46 km/h and covers 404 km in 8h 45m. The 15666/Dimapur–Guwahati BG Express has an average speed of 46 km/h and covers 404 km in 8h 50m.

== Route and halts ==
The important halts of the train are:

- Guwahati
- Jagi Road
- Chaparmukh Junction
- Kampur
- Hojai
- Lanka
- Lumding Junction
- Diphu
- Dimapur
- Furkating
- Golaghat
- Barua Bamungaon
- Jorhat Town
- Mariani

== Coach composition ==
The train has standard ICF rakes with a max speed of 110 kmph. The train consists of 13 coaches:

- 1 AC II Tier
- 2 AC III Tier
- 4 Sleeper coaches
- 3 Second Sitting
- 2 General Unreserved
- 2 Seating cum Luggage Rake

== Traction ==
Both trains are hauled by a Guwahati Loco Shed- based WDM-3A diesel locomotive from Guwahati to Dimapur and vice versa. Now shifted to Malda Town WDM-3A or New Guwahati-based WDM-3D.

== Rake sharing ==
The train shares its rake with 15603/15604 Kamakhya–Ledo Intercity Express, 15669/15670 Nagaland Express and 55601/55602 Kamakhya–Lumding Passenger.

== See also ==
- Guwahati railway station
- Mariani Junction railway station
- Nagaland Express
- Kamakhya–Ledo Intercity Express
- Kamakhya–Lumding Passenger
