= Dibrugarh railway station =

Railway station in Assam, India

Dibrugarh

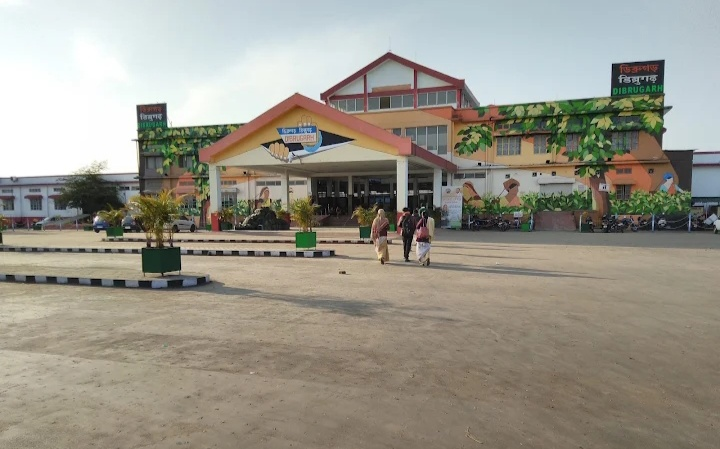
- Dibrugarh Railway Station Complex

General information
- Location: Station Road, Banipur, Dibrugarh-786003, Assam India
- Coordinates: 27°27′52″N 94°56′13″E
- Elevation: 108 metres (354 ft)
- System: Regional rail and Commuter rail station
- Owner: Indian Railways
- Operator: Northeast Frontier Railway zone
- Lines: Lumding–Dibrugarh section; Dibrugarh-Simaluguri branch line; Rangiya-Murkongselek section via Bogibeel Bridge
- Platforms: 4
- Tracks: 18
- Connections: Taxi, Auto Stand, E-rickshaw

Construction
- Structure type: At grade
- Parking: Available
- Cycle facilities: Available
- Accessible: Yes

Other information
- Status: Functioning
- Station code: DBRG
- Zone(s): Northeast Frontier Railway
- Division(s): Tinsukia

History
- Opened: July 16, 1883; 143 years ago
- Electrified: Completed
- Former names: Dibru-Sadiya Railway

Passengers
- 20K/Day (▲ high)

Services
Location
- Location within Assam

Dibrugarh railway station is a railway junction station on the Lumding–Dibrugarh section. It is rated as an A Category railway station in Northeast Frontier Railway and is located in Dibrugarh, the 3rd largest city in the Indian state of Assam. Dibrugarh railway station (DBRG) is the second railway station of the historic city of Dibrugarh after Dibrugarh Town railway station (DBRT). It is the largest railway station in Northeast India in terms of area covering approx 400 Bighas of Land. Nearest to the India's longest rail-cum-road Bogibeel Bridge which connects Southern Bank to Northern Bank of Assam.

== Overview ==
In her book Urban History of India: A Case Study, Deepali Barua writes: "Dibrugarh was made the district headquarters in 1840. But it was not only for strategic importance that it soon became so important. The greatest interest of the British in Assam was the commerce centring around it. As early as 1823 the British discovered tea in the modern Sadiya region. It was at Chabua The Birth Place of Indian Tea, 20 miles to the east of Dibrugarh that the British made their first experiments with tea cultivation with indigenous plants. Very soon oil and coal were discovered in areas near to Dibrugarh town. Oil was discovered at Digboi in 1882 and coal was found at Margherita in 1876. All these greatly enhanced the importance of Dibrugarh as a centre of industrial, commercial, and administrative activities."

== Station facilities ==
Following services available in Dibrugarh Railway Station:

- 02 (02 Bedded) AC Retiring Rooms with Free Wi-Fi/TV/Locker/Charging point
- 01 (02 Bedded) Non AC Retiring Rooms with Free Wi-Fi/TV/Locker/Charging point
- 01 (06 Bedded) Non AC Dormitory with Free Wi-Fi/TV/Charging point
- Brahmaputra Lounge
- High Speed Google Railwire Free Wi-Fi service
- Upper Class/Lower Class Waiting Rooms having Free Wi-Fi/AC/TV/Charging points/Drinking water & separate Ladies/Gents Washrooms
- Tea Stall
- FOB with 2X Elevators
- CCTV Surveillance
- Cloak Room

== History ==
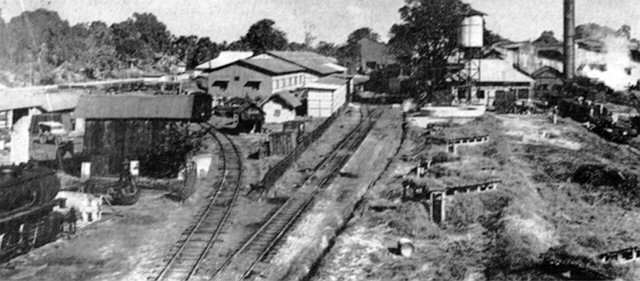

The 1,000 mm (3 ft 3 3/8 in)-wide metre-gauge line from Dibrugarh steamer ghat to Makum was opened to passenger traffic on 16 July 1883.

The metre-gauge railway track earlier laid by Assam Bengal Railway from Chittagong to Lumding was extended to Tinsukia on the Dibru–Sadiya line in 1903.

The project for the conversion of the Lumding–Dibrugarh section from metre gauge to 5 ft 6 in (1,676 mm) broad gauge was completed by the end of 1997.

== Dibrugarh-Kanyakumari Vivek Express ==
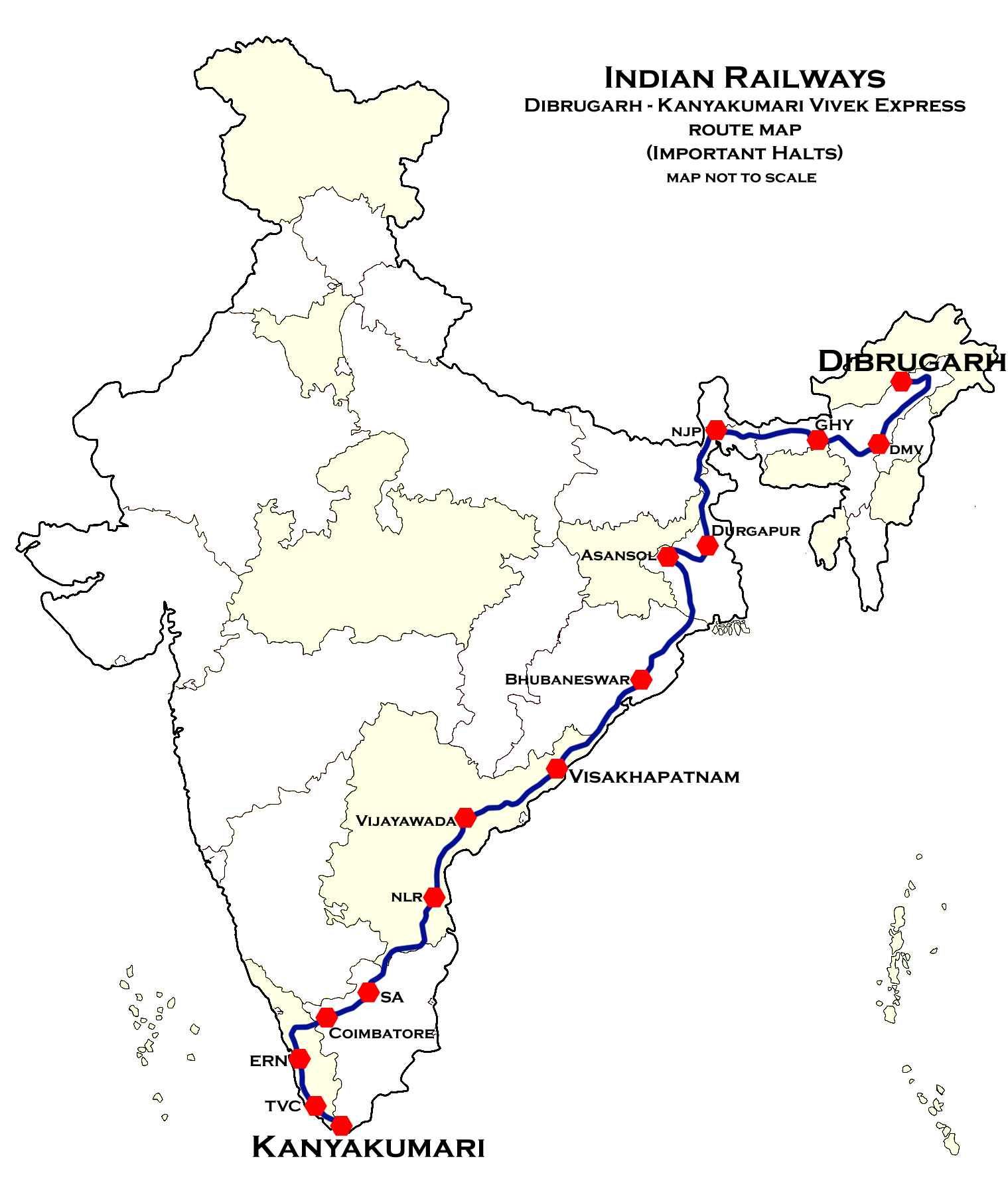

The Dibrugarh–Kanyakumari Vivek Express was named in memories of Sri Swami Vivekananda which was introduced by Former Railway Minister Smt Mamata Banerjee on 19 November 2011. It is the only train service which covers the longest route in India. The train runs for 4,278 km (2,658 mi) across the states of Assam, Nagaland, West Bengal, Jharkhand, Odisha, Andhra Pradesh, Kerala and Tamil Nadu in 75 hours.

== Bogibeel Bridge ==
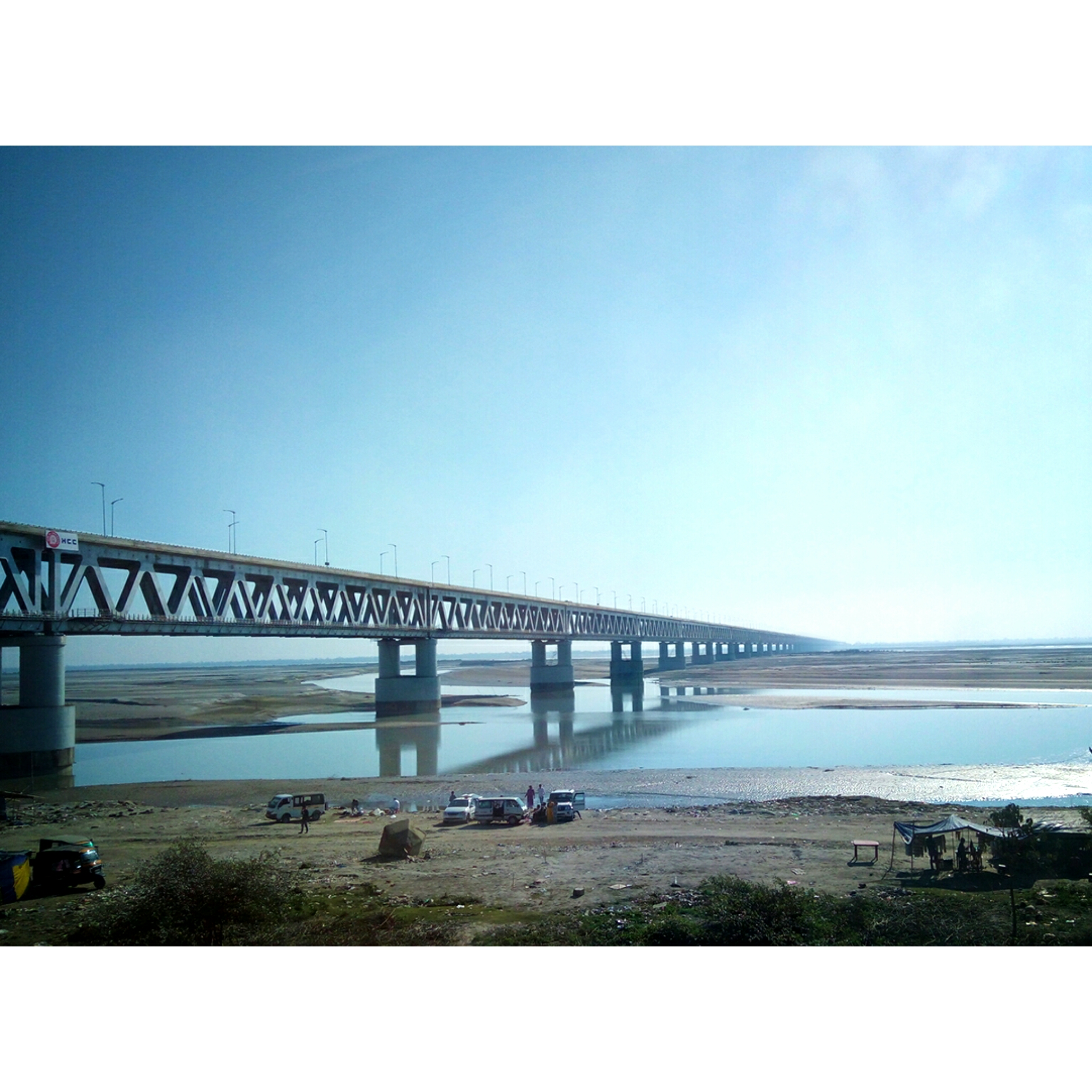

The Iconic Engineering Marvel 4.94 km (3 mi) long, combined Rail-Cum-Road Bogibeel Bridge across the Brahmaputra connects the Souther Bank of Assam Dibrugarh with the Northern Bank of Assam Dhemaji. The foundation of the infrastructure was laid by Former Prime Minister, Sri Atal Bihari Vajpayee in 2002, which is finally dedicated to the Nation on 25 December 2018 by Honourable Prime Minister Sri Narendra Modi.

== Major trains ==
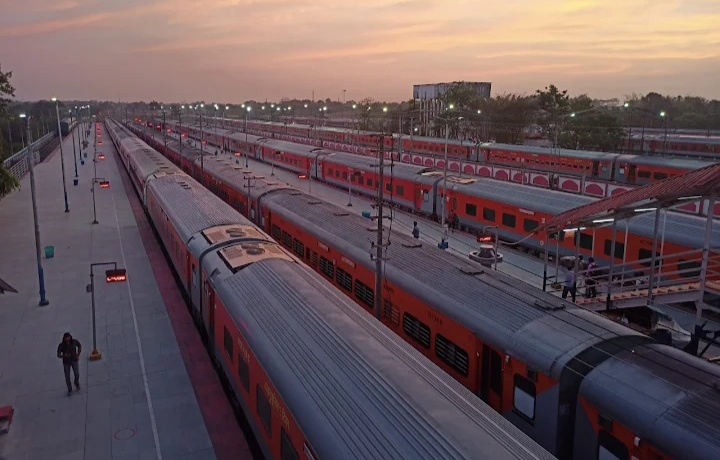

Major Trains available from this railway station are as follows:

- Dibrugarh-Guwahati Shatabdi Express
- New Delhi–Dibrugarh Rajdhani Express (Via New Tinsukia)
- New Delhi–Dibrugarh Rajdhani Express (Via Moranhat)
- New Delhi–Dibrugarh Rajdhani Express (Via Rangapara North)
- Dibrugarh–Kanyakumari Vivek Express
- Dibrugarh - Gomti Nagar Amrit Bharat Express
- New Tinsukia–Tambaram Express
- Dibrugarh–Amritsar Express
- Dibrugarh–Chandigarh Express
- Dibrugarh–Lokmanya Tilak Terminus Superfast Express
- Dibrugarh–Lalgarh Avadh Assam Express
- Dibrugarh–Kolkata Superfast Express
- Dibrugarh–Howrah Kamrup Express via Guwahati
- Dibrugarh–Howrah Kamrup Express Via Rangapara North
- Dibrugarh–Rajendra Nagar Weekly Express
- Dibrugarh - Deogarh Express
- New Tinsukia–SMVT Bengaluru Superfast Express
- Silchar–New Tinsukia Barak Brahmaputra Express
- Rangiya–New Tinsukia Express
- Naharlagun - Tinsukia Express
- Dibrugarh Town - Guwahati Nagaland Express

== See also ==
- North Eastern Railway Connectivity Project
- North Western Railway zone

Preceding station	Indian Railways	Following station
Dikom towards ?	Northeast Frontier Railway zone Lumding–Dibrugarh section	Terminus
Moranhat towards ?	Northeast Frontier Railway zone Dibrugarh–Simaluguri branch line	Terminus
Dibrugarh Town towards ?	Northeast Frontier Railway zone Line towards proposed Bogibeel bridge	Terminus
