= New Alipurduar railway station =

Railway station

NEW ALIPURDUAR

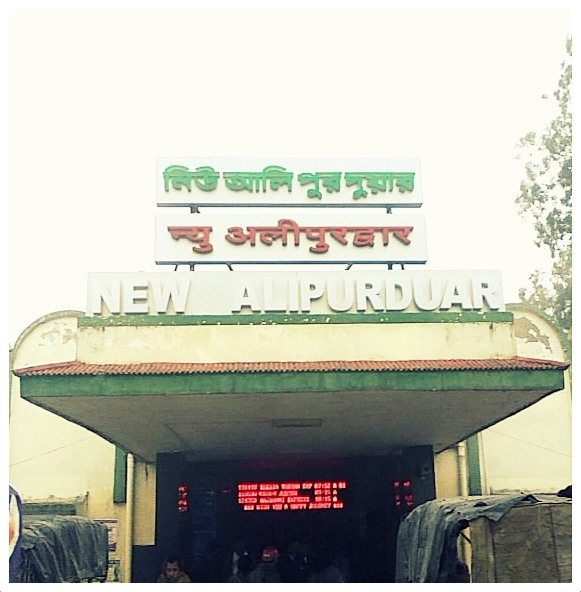
- New Alipurduar railway station

General information
- Location: New Alipurduar, West Bengal; India
- Coordinates: 26.5237°N 89.5335°E
- Elevation: 46 m (151 ft)
- System: Indian Railways station
- Owner: Indian Railways
- Operator: North East Frontier Railway
- Line: Barauni–Guwahati line
- Platforms: 3 (more under construction)
- Tracks: 1,676 mm (5 ft 6 in) broad gauge

Construction
- Structure type: At grade
- Parking: Available

Other information
- Status: Functioning
- Station code: NOQ
- Zone(s): North East Frontier Railway
- Division(s): Alipurduar

History
- Electrified: Yes, 2021
- Former names: Assam Bengal Railway

Services
| Preceding station | Indian Railways | Following station |
|---|---|---|
| New Baneswar towards ? | Northeast Frontier Railway zone New Jalpaiguri–New Bongaigaon section | Samuktala Road Junction towards ? |
Location
- Location within India Location within West Bengal Location within India
- Interactive map of New Alipurduar

New Alipurduar is one of the four railway stations that serve Alipurduar city in Alipurduar district in the Indian state of West Bengal. Its station code is NOQ. The other three adjacent railway stations are Alipurduar Junction (station code APDJ), Alipurduar Court (station code APDC) and Alipurduar (station code APD).

== History ==
During British rule, all links from the northern part of Bengal and Assam to the rest of India were through the eastern part of Bengal. The most important connection was the Calcutta–Parbatipur–Haldibari–Siliguri link, first established in 1878 and then developed in stages (for details see Howrah–New Jalpaiguri line). During the nineteenth century, Lalmonirhat was linked to the Dooars. In pre-independence days, a 1,000 mm (3 ft 3 3/8 in) metre gauge railway track running via Radhikapur, Biral, Parbatipur, Tista, Gitaldaha and Golokganj connected Fakiragram in Assam with Katihar in Bihar.

With the partition of India in 1947, all these links were lost. Indian Railways took up the Assam Link Project in 1948 to build a rail link between Fakiragram and Kishanganj. Fakiragram was connected to the Indian railway system in 1950 through the Indian portion of north Bengal with a 1,000 mm (3 ft 3 3/8 in) metre gauge track. The New Jalpaiguri–New Bongaigaon section was partly new construction, partly old line converted to 1,676 mm (5 ft 6 in) broad gauge in 1966. The 265 km long 1,676 mm (5 ft 6 in) broad gauge Siliguri–Jogihopa railway line was constructed between 1963 and 1965.

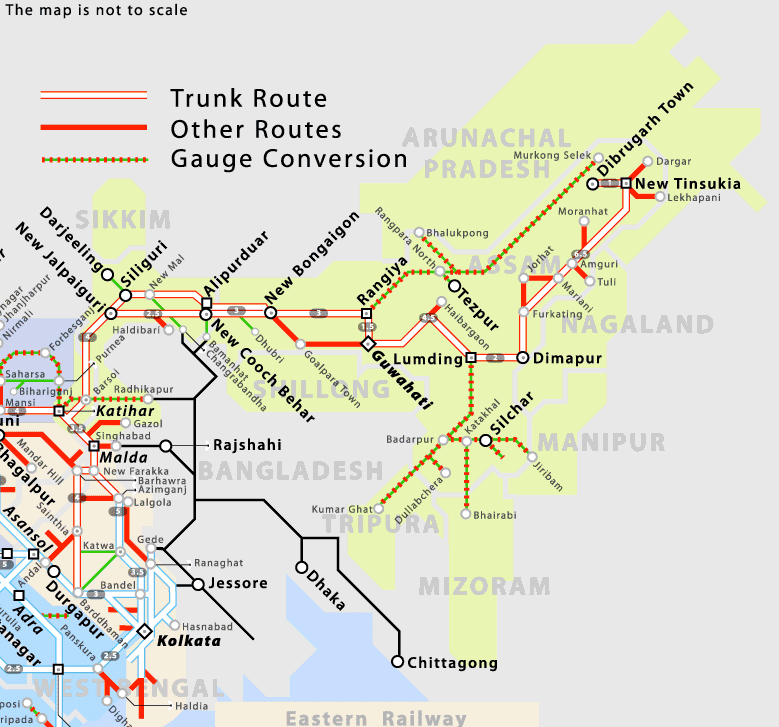
Railway map, Northeast Zone

== Importance over other adjacent stations ==
Most of the long-distance trains from other parts of India pass through and stop at New Alipurdur railway junction as it is connected with double track to Assam and the rest of Bengal. The older Alipurduar Junction was on metre-gauge track that was converted to broad gauge much later and fewer trains pass through Alipurduar Jn station. This station is the biggest railway station in Alipurduar, with more than 90 trains stopping daily and three trains daily originating.

== Major trains ==
1. Kamakhya–Howrah Vande Bharat Sleeper Express
2. New Jalpaiguri - Guwahati Vande Bharat Express
3. New Delhi–Dibrugarh Rajdhani Express (via New Tinsukia)
4. New Delhi–Dibrugarh Rajdhani Express (via Moranhat)
5. New Delhi–Dibrugarh Rajdhani Express (via Rangapara North)
6. Sir M. Visvesvaraya Terminal–Kamakhya AC Superfast Express
7. Dibrugarh - Gomti Nagar Amrit Bharat Express
8. Silchar - Thiruvananthapuram Aronai Superfast Express
9. Silchar–Coimbatore Superfast Express
10. Silchar - Sealdah Kanchanjunga Express
11. Dibrugarh–Kanyakumari Vivek Express
12. Dibrugarh–Amritsar Express
13. Dibrugarh–Chandigarh Express
14. Dibrugarh - Lokmanya Tilak Terminus Superfast Express
15. Dibrugarh-Lalgarh Avadh Assam Express
16. Dibrugarh–Kolkata Superfast Express
17. Dibrugarh-Howrah Kamrup Express via Guwahati
18. Dibrugarh–Howrah Kamrup Express Via Rangapara North
19. Dibrugarh - Rajendra Nagar Terminal Express
20. Silghat Town - Tambaram Nagaon Express
21. Silghat Town - Kolkata Kaziranga Express
22. Agartala - Sealdah Kanchanjunga Express
23. Agartala - Kolkata Garib Rath Express
24. New Tinsukia–SMVT Bengaluru Superfast Express
25. New Tinsukia–Rajendra Nagar Weekly Express
26. New Tinsukia - Darbhanga Jivacch Link Express
27. New Tinsukia–Tambaram Express
28. Guwahati - Jammu Tawi Lohit Express
29. Guwahati- Sir M. Visvesvaraya Terminal Kaziranga Superfast Express
30. Guwahati-Bikaner Express
31. Guwahati - Okha Dwarka Express
32. Guwahati - Barmer Express
33. Guwahati-Jammu Tawi Amarnath Express
34. Guwahati - Lokmanya Tilak Terminus Express
35. Guwahati-Howrah Saraighat Superfast Express
36. Guwahati - Kolkata Garib Rath Express
37. Kamakhya–Shri Mata Vaishno Devi Katra Express
38. Kamakhya–Gandhidham Superfast Express
39. Kamakhya - Jodhpur, Bhagat Ki Kothi Express
40. Kamakhya - Charlapalli Amrit Bharat Express
41. Kamakhya - Delhi Brahmaputra Mail
42. Kamakhya - Puri Express (via Adra)
43. Kamakhya–Gaya Express
44. Kamakhya - Delhi Northeast Express
45. New Alipurduar - Sealdah Padatik Superfast Express
46. New Alipurduar - SMVT Bangalore Amrit Bharat Express
47. Silchar–Secunderabad Express
48. Bamanhat - Sealdah Uttar Banga Express
49. New Jalpaiguri - Guwahati Express
50. New Jalpaiguri - Bongaigaon Express
51. New Alipurdiar - Sealdah Teesta Torsha Express
52. Alipurduar–Kamakhya Intercity Express
53. Dibrugarh - Deogarh Express

*Other trains are available from nearby Alipurduar Junction railway station (APDJ).

== See also ==
- North Eastern Railway Connectivity Project
- North Western Railway zone
