= Dibrugarh–Rajendra Nagar Weekly Express =

Train in India

Overview
- Service type: Express
- First service: 14 December 2013; 12 years ago
- Current operator: East Central Railway

Route
- Termini: Dibrugarh (DBRG); Rajendra Nagar Terminal (RJPB)
- Stops: 27
- Distance travelled: 1,445 km (898 mi)
- Average journey time: 31 hrs 30 mins
- Service frequency: Weekly. (Note: Runs one day in a week for every direction.)
- Train number: 13281 / 13282

On-board services
- Classes: AC First Class, AC 2 Tier, AC 3 Tier, Sleeper Class, General Unreserved
- Seating arrangements: Yes
- Sleeping arrangements: Yes
- Catering facilities: Available
- Observation facilities: Large windows
- Baggage facilities: No
- Other facilities: Below the seats

Technical
- Rolling stock: LHB coach
- Track gauge: 1,676 mm (5 ft 6 in)
- Operating speed: 46 km/h (29 mph) average including halts.

The 13281 / 13282 Dibrugarh–Rajendra Nagar Weekly Express is an express train belonging to East Central Railway zone that runs between Dibrugarh and Rajendra Nagar Terminal in India. It is currently being operated with 13281/13282 train numbers on a weekly basis.

== Service ==
The 13281/Dibrugarh–Rajendra Nagar Weekly Express has an average speed of 46 km/h and covers 1445 km in 31h 30m. The 13282/Rajendra Nagar (Patna)–Dibrugarh Weekly Express has an average speed of 46 km/h and covers 1445 km in 31h 30m.

== Route & halts ==
The important halts of the train are:

ASSAM

- Dibrugarh
- New Tinsukia Junction
- Duliajan
- Naharkatiya
- Namrup
- Simaluguri Junction
- Mariani Junction
- Furkating Junction
- Diphu
- Lumding Junction
- Hojai
- Chaparmukh
- Jagiroad
- Guwahati
- Kamakhya Junction
- Goalpara
- New Bongaigaon Junction
- Kokrajhar

NAGALAND

- Dimapur

WEST BENGAL

- New Alipurduar
- New Cooch Behar Junction
- Mathabhanga
- Jalpaiguri Road
- New Jalpaiguri (Siliguri)

BIHAR

- Kishanganj
- Katihar Junction
- Mansi Junction
- Khagaria Junction
- Begusarai
- Barauni Junction
- Bakhtiyarpur Junction
- Rajendra Nagar Terminal

== Coach composition ==
The train has standard LHB rakes with max speed of 130 kmph. The train consists of 22 coaches:

- 1 First AC
- 2 AC II Tier
- 6 AC III Tier
- 1 AC III Tier Economy
- 1 Pantry car
- 6 Sleeper coaches
- 3 General
- 2 Head-on Generation

== Traction ==
Both trains are hauled by a Siliguri Loco Shed-based WDM-3D twins diesel locomotive from New Jalpaiguri to New Tinsukia Junction and from New Jalpaiguri to Rajendra Nagar Terminal the train is hauled by WAP-7 locomotive of Gomoh Loco Shed and vice versa.

== Rake sharing ==
The train shares its rake with 12395/12396 Ziyarat Express.

== See also ==
- Rajendra Nagar Terminal railway station
- New Tinsukia Junction railway station
- Dibrugarh-Chandigarh Express
- Ziyarat Express
