= Lokmanya Tilak Terminus–Dibrugarh Express =

India Railways train

Dibrugarh-Lokmanya Tilak Terminus Express

Overview
- Service type: Express
- First service: 9 October 1987; 39 years ago 20 July 2022; 4 years ago (extended to Dibrugarh from Guwahati)
- Current operator: Northeast Frontier Railway

Route
- Termini: Lokmanya Tilak Terminus; Dibrugarh
- Stops: 51 as 15645, 53 as 15646
- Distance travelled: 3,144 km (1,954 mi)
- Average journey time: 60 hours 45 minutes as 15645, 60 hours 25 minutes as 15646
- Service frequency: Bi-weekly
- Train number: 15645 / 15646

On-board services
- Classes: AC First Class, AC 2-tier, AC 3-tier, Sleeper class, General unreserved
- Seating arrangements: Yes
- Sleeping arrangements: Yes
- Catering facilities: Pantry car, On-board catering, E-catering (available at LTT, NK, MMR, BSL, BAU, KNW, HD, ET, JBP, MZP, DDU, DNR, PNBE, NNA, KIR, KNE, KYQ, GHY, LMG, DMV for 15645 and at DMV, LMG, GHY, KYQ, NBQ, NOQ, NCB, PNBE, DNR, BXR, DDU, MZP, PCOI, STA, BAU, BSL, MMR, NK, KYN, TNA, LTT for 15646)
- Baggage facilities: Below the seats

Technical
- Rolling stock: LHB coaches
- Track gauge: 1,676 mm (5 ft 6 in)
- Operating speed: 52 km/h (32 mph)

The 15645/46 Lokmanya Tilak Terminus–Dibrugarh Express is an Express train belonging to Indian Railways' Northeast Frontier Railway zone that runs between Lokmanya Tilak Terminus of Maharashtra and Dibrugarh of Assam in India.

It is also called the Dadar Express. It operates as train number 15645 from Lokmanya Tilak Terminus to Dibrugarh and as train number 15646 in the reverse direction, serving the states of Maharashtra, Madhya Pradesh, Uttar Pradesh, Bihar, West Bengal, Nagaland & Assam.

== Coaches ==
The 15645 / 46 Lokmanya Tilak Terminus–Dibrugarh Express runs with 1 AC First Class coaches, 1 AC 2-tier coaches, 5 AC 3-tier coaches, 11 sleeper class, 2 general unreserved coaches, 2 SLR (seating with luggage rake) coaches and 1 End-On-Generator. It also carries a pantry car.

As is customary with most train services in India, coach composition may be amended at the discretion of Indian Railways depending on demand.

== Service ==
The 15645 Lokmanya Tilak Terminus–Dibrugarh Express covers the distance of 3,144 km (1,954 mi) in 50 hours 45 mins (52 km/h) and in 60 hours 25 mins as the 15646 Dibrugarh–Lokmanya Tilak Terminus Express (52 km/h). The 15645 Lokmanya Tilak Terminus-Dibrugarh Express departs from Lokmanya Tilak Terminus at 08:05 on Wednesdays and Saturdays and arrives on the third day at 20:50. The 15646 Dibrugarh-Lokmanya Tilak Express departs from Dibrugarh at 05:25 on Wednesdays and Sundays and arrives on the third day at 17:50.

As the average speed of the train is lower than 55 km/h (34 mph), as per railway rules, its fare doesn't include a superfast surcharge.

== Routing ==
The halts of the train is given as follows:

MAHARASHTRA

1. Lokmanya Tilak Terminus
2. Thane (only for 15646)
3. Kalyan Junction
4. Nasik Road
5. Manmad Junction
6. Bhusaval Junction

MADHYA PRADESH

1. Burhanpur
2. Khandwa Junction
3. Harda
4. Itarsi Junction
5. Pipariya (only for 15646)
6. Jabalpur
7. Katni Junction
8. Satna

UTTAR PRADESH

1. Prayagraj Chheoki Junction
2. Mirzapur
3. Pt. Deen Dayal Upadhyaya Junction
4. Dildarnagar Junction

BIHAR

1. Buxar
2. Dumraon
3. Ara Junction
4. Danapur Junction
5. Patna Junction
6. Patna Sahib
7. Bakhtiyarpur Junction
8. Barh
9. Mokama
10. New Barauni Junction
11. Begusarai
12. Khagaria Junction
13. Mansi Junction
14. Thana Bihpur Junction
15. Naugachia
16. Katihar Junction
17. Barsoi Junction
18. Kishanganj

WEST BENGAL

1. New Jalpaiguri (Siliguri)
2. Dhupguri
3. New Cooch Behar
4. New Alipurduar

ASSAM

1. Kokrajhar
2. New Bongaigaon Junction
3. Barpeta Road
4. Rangiya Junction
5. Kamakhya Junction
6. Guwahati
7. Hojai
8. Lumding Junction
9. Diphu
10. Furkating Junction
11. Mariani Junction
12. Simaluguri Junction
13. New Tinsukia Junction
14. Dibrugarh

NAGALAND

1. Dimapur

.

== Traction ==
A Kalyan-based WAP-7 hauls the train from Lokmanya Tilak Terminus till Guwahati after which a Siliguri-based WDP-4/4B/4D pulls the train to its destination, Dibrugarh, and vice versa. Additional bankers are used between Kasara and Igatpuri due to the Thal ghat section.
