= Chaparmukh Junction railway station =

Railway station in Assam, India

Chaparmukh Junction
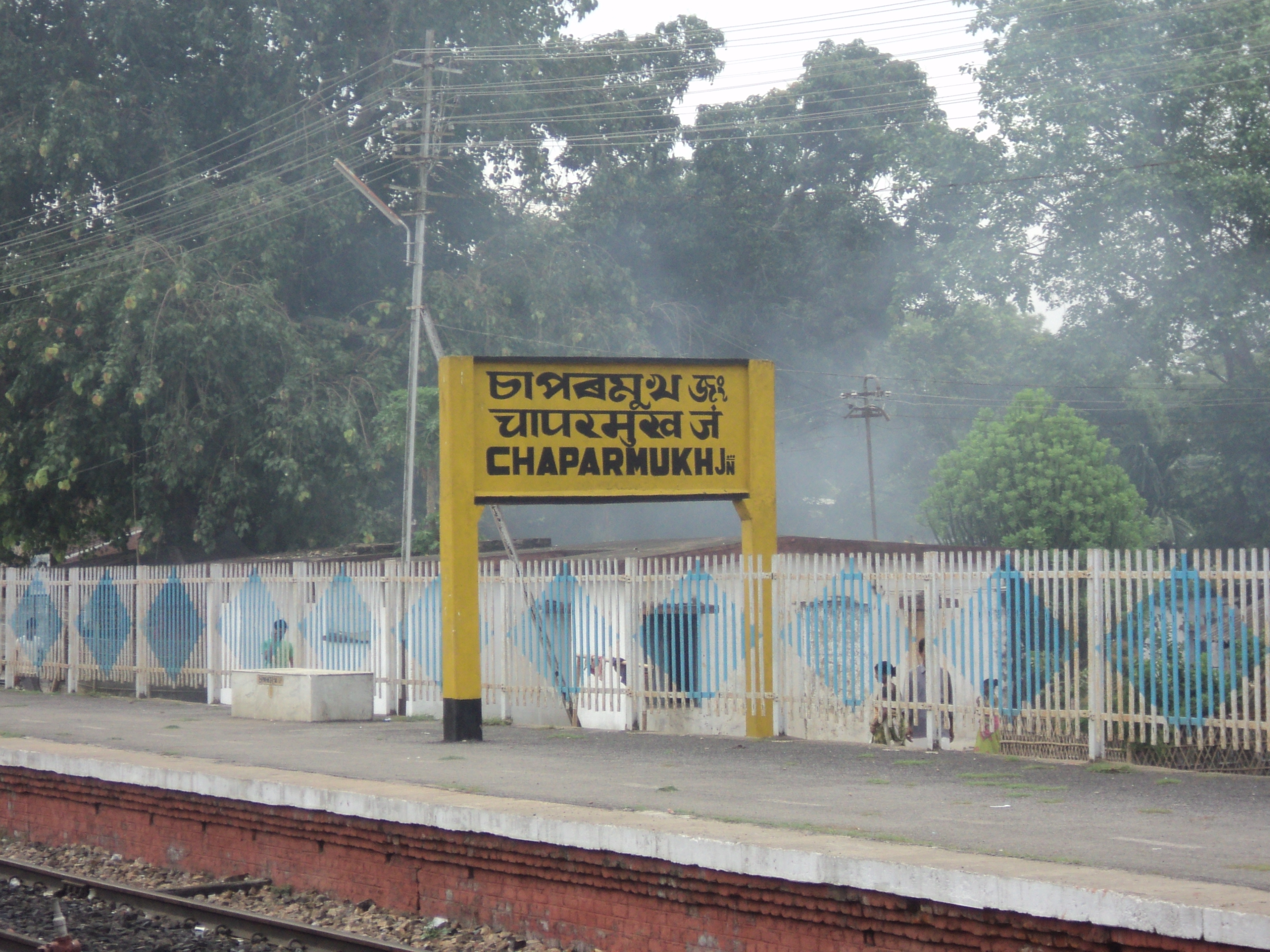
- Chaparmukh railway station

General information
- Location: Station Road, Kachowa Gaon, Chaparmukh, Assam; India
- Coordinates: 26°12′08″N 92°30′42″E
- Elevation: 65 metres (213 ft)
- System: Express trains, Intercity train & Goods train.
- Owner: Indian Railways
- Operator: Northeast Frontier Railway
- Line: Guwahati–Lumding section
- Platforms: 2
- Tracks: 4
- Connections: Autorickshaw, Mini Vans

Construction
- Structure type: Standard on ground
- Parking: Available
- Cycle facilities: N/A

Other information
- Status: Functioning
- Station code: CPK
- Zone(s): Northeast Frontier Railway zone
- Division(s): Lumding

History
- Former names: Assam Bengal Railway

Passengers
- 10,000 ▲9%
Location
- Location within Assam Location within India

Chaparmukh is railway junction station under Northeast Frontier Railway of Lumding railway division located in Kachowa Gaon of Nagaon district in the state of Assam.

== Major trains ==
1. New Delhi–Dibrugarh Rajdhani Express (Via New Tinsukia)
2. Silghat Town - Tambaram Nagaon Express
3. Dibrugarh-Lalgarh Avadh Assam Express
4. Silchar–Secunderabad Express
5. Dibrugarh-Howrah Kamrup Express via Guwahati
6. Agartala - Deoghar Weekly Express
7. Silghat Town - Kolkata Kaziranga Express
8. New Tinsukia–Amritsar Express
9. Dibrugarh–Rajendra Nagar Weekly Express
10. Rangiya–Silchar Express
11. Guwahati–Dullabcherra Express
12. Alipurduar–Silghat Town Rajya Rani Express
13. Guwahati–Jorhat Town Jan Shatabdi Express
14. Guwahati - Mariani BG Express
15. Alipurduar–Lumding Intercity Express
16. Guwahati–Ledo Intercity Express
17. New Tinsukia - Darbhanga Jivacch Link Express
