= New Tinsukia–SMVT Bengaluru Superfast Express =

Train in India

Overview
- Service type: Superfast
- Status: Operating
- Locale: Assam, Nagaland, West Bengal, Bihar, Jharkhand, Odisha, Andhra Pradesh, Tamil Nadu, Karnataka
- First service: 4 January 2010
- Current operator: Northeast Frontier Railway

Route
- Termini: New Tinsukia Junction (NTSK); Sir M. Visvesvaraya Terminal, Bengaluru (SMVB)
- Stops: 39
- Distance travelled: 3,542 km (2,201 mi)
- Average journey time: 63 hours
- Service frequency: Weekly
- Train number: 22501/22502

On-board services
- Classes: AC 2 Tier (2A), AC 3 Tier (3A), Sleeper (SL)
- Seating arrangements: Available
- Catering facilities: Available
- Baggage facilities: Available

Technical
- Rolling stock: LHB coach
- Track gauge: Broad gauge
- Operating speed: 54 km/h
Route map
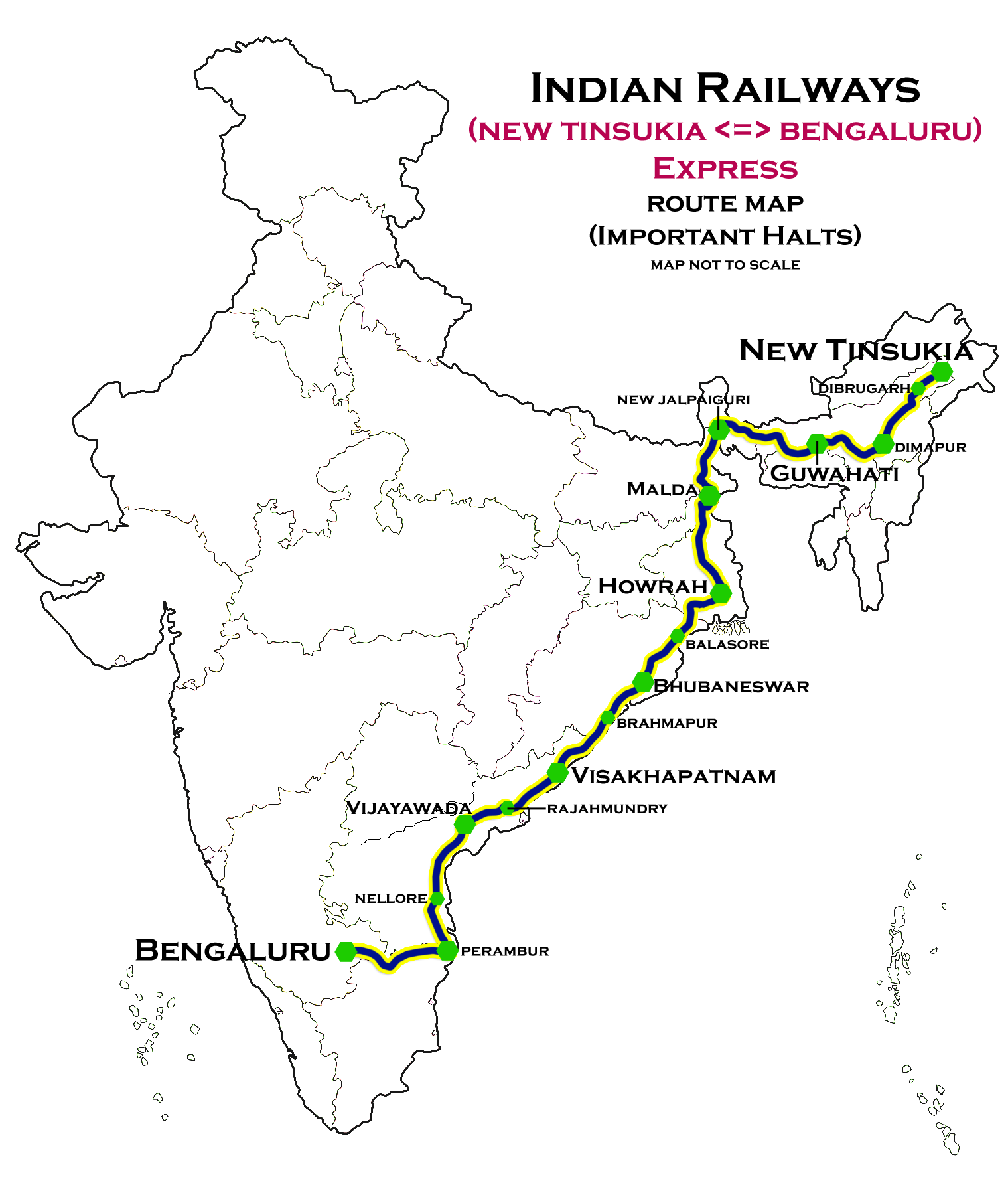
- New Tinsukia–Bengaluru Express route map

The 22501/02 New Tinsukia–SMVT Bengaluru Superfast Express is a weekly Superfast train which connects Tinsukia, the easternmost town of Assam with the South Indian Metropolis of Bengaluru via Rampurhat, Malda Town, New Jalpaiguri, New Bongaigaon Jn. The train consists of AC 1st class, 2-tier, 3-tier and sleeper-class coaches. It is 6th longest train service of Indian Railways, as of 2023, which travels a total distance of 3,542 kilometres (2,201 mi).

== Time-table ==
- Train no. 22502 from New Tinsukia to Bengaluru.
- Train no. 22501 from Bengaluru to New Tinsukia.

The train leaves from New Tinsukia (NTSK) on every Friday at 6:30 P.M. and arrives SMVT Bengaluru (SMVB) every Monday at 11:50 A.M. traversing a distance of 3,542 kilometres (2,201 mi) in 63 hours for an average speed of 56 km/h (35 mph).

== Major halts ==
KARNATAKA

1. Sir M. Visvesvaraya Terminal (Starts)
2. Krishnarajapuram
3. Bangarapet Junction

TAMIL NADU

1. Jolarpettai Junction
2. Katpadi Junction
3. Perambur (Chennai)

ANDHRA PRADESH

1. Nellore
2. Ongole
3. Vijayawada Junction
4. Rajahmundry
5. Visakhapatnam Junction
6. Vizianagaram Junction

ODISHA

1. Brahmapur
2. Balugaon
3. Khurda Road Junction
4. Bhubaneswar
5. Cuttack Junction
6. Balasore

WEST BENGAL

1. Kharagpur Junction
2. Dankuni (Kolkata)
3. Bolpur Shantiniketan
4. Rampurhat Junction
5. Malda Town
6. New Jalpaiguri (Siliguri)
7. Jalpaiguri Road
8. New Cooch Behar
9. New Alipurduar

BIHAR

1. Kishanganj

NAGALAND

1. Dimapur

ASSAM

1. New Bongaigaon Junction
2. Goalpara Town
3. Guwahati
4. Moranhat
5. Sibsagar Town
6. Simaluguri Junction
7. Mariani Junction
8. Furkating Junction
9. Diphu
10. Lumding Junction
11. Dibrugarh
12. New Tinsukia (Ends)

Note: Bold letters indicates Major Railway Stations/Major Cities.

== Locomotive ==
The train is hauled by WAP-7 Locomotive of Electric Loco Shed, Howrah from New Tinsukia to upto Visakhapatnam. Lastly from Visakhapatnam to Sir M. Visvesvaraya Terminal it is hauled by WAP-4 locomotive of Electric Loco Shed, Erode.

== E-Catering ==
As of September 2022, The E-Catering facility for 22501 SMVT Bengaluru New Tinsukia Weekly Express is available in following stations:

- Katpadi Junction
- Vijayawada
- Rajahmundry
- Visakhapatnam
- Vizianagaram
- Kharagpur
- Bolpur Shantiniketan
- Rampurhat
- Malda Town
- New Jalpaiguri
- Mariani Junction
- New Tinsukia.

Similarly the E-Catering facility for 22502 New Tinsukia SMVT Bengaluru Weekly Express is available in following stations:

- New Tinsukia
- Mariani Junction
- New Alipurduar
- New Jalpaiguri
- Kishanganj
- Malda Town
- Rampurhat
- Bolpur Shantiniketan
- Bhubaneswar
- Khurda Road
- Brahmapur
- Vizianagaram
- Visakhapatnam
- Rajahmundry
- Vijayawada and
- Sir M. Visvesvaraya Terminal

== See also ==
- Longest train services of Indian Railways
- Dibrugarh–Tambaram Express
- Chennai–New Jalpaiguri Superfast Express
- Guwahati–Bengaluru Cantt. Superfast Express
- Thiruvananthapuram–Silchar Superfast Express
- Bangalore Cantonment–Agartala Humsafar Express
