= Makum railway station =

Railway station in Assam, India

Makum

General information
- Location: Assam Trunk Road, Makum, Tinsukia District, Assam; India
- Coordinates: 27°29′13″N 95°26′21″E
- Elevation: 130 metres (430 ft)
- System: Indian Railways junction station
- Owner: Indian Railways
- Operator: Northeast Frontier Railway
- Line: Lumding–Dibrugarh section
- Platforms: 2

Construction
- Structure type: Standard on ground
- Parking: No
- Cycle facilities: No

Other information
- Status: Functioning
- Station code: MJN
- Zone(s): Northeast Frontier Railway
- Division(s): Tinsukia

History
- Opened: 1883
Location
- Location within Assam Location within India

Makum is a railway junction station on the Lumding–Dibrugarh section. It is located in Tinsukia district in the Indian state of Assam. It serves Makum and the surrounding areas.

== History ==
The 1,000 mm (3 ft 3 3/8 in)-wide metre-gauge line from Dibrugarh steamer ghat to Makum was opened to passenger traffic on 16 July 1883.

The metre-gauge railway track earlier laid by Assam Bengal Railway from Chittagong to Lumding was extended to Tinsukia on the Dibru–Sadiya line in 1903.

Conversion of the Lumding–Dibrugarh section from metre gauge to 5 ft 6 in (1,676 mm) broad gauge was completed by the end of 1997.

Preceding station	Indian Railways	Following station
Tinsukia towards ?	Northeast Frontier Railway zone Tinsukia–Dangri branch line	Bara Hapjan towards ?
Tinsukia towards ?	Northeast Frontier Railway zone Tinsukia–Ledo branch line	Tingrai towards ?
