= Guwahati–Ledo Intercity Express =

Overview
- Service type: Express
- First service: 1 August 1997; 29 years ago
- Current operator: Northeast Frontier Railway zone

Route
- Termini: Guwahati (GHY); Ledo (LEDO)
- Stops: 33
- Distance travelled: 571 km (355 mi)
- Average journey time: 14 hours 35 minutes
- Service frequency: Daily
- Train number: 15603/15604

On-board services
- Classes: Sleeper class, AC 3 Tier, AC 2 Tier, Unreserved
- Seating arrangements: Yes
- Sleeping arrangements: Yes
- Catering facilities: No
- Entertainment facilities: No

Technical
- Rolling stock: ICF coach
- Track gauge: 1,676 mm (5 ft 6 in)
- Operating speed: 40 km/h (25 mph)
Route map
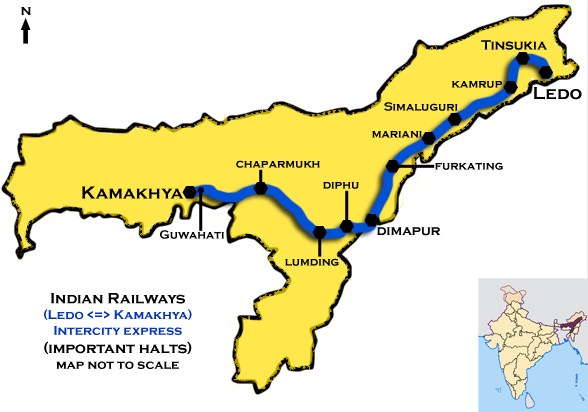

Guwahati–Ledo Intercity Express is an intercity train of the Indian Railways connecting Guwahati in Guwahati and Ledo on eastern end of Assam. It is currently being operated with 15603/15604 train numbers on a daily basis.

== Service ==
The 15603/Guwahati–Ledo Intercity Express has an average speed of 40 km/h and covers 578 km in 14 hrs 20 mins. 15604/Ledo–Guwahati Intercity Express has an average speed of 53 km/h and covers 578 km in 14 hrs 35 mins.

== Route and halts ==
- Guwahati
- Jagi Road
- Chaparmukh Junction
- Hojai
- Lanka
- Lumding Junction
- Diphu
- Dimapur
- Bokajan
- Sarupathar
- Barpathar
- Furkating Junction
- Titabar
- Mariani Junction
- New Tinsukia Junction
- Tinsukia Junction
- Makum Junction
- Digboi
- Margherita
- Ledo

== Coach composition ==
The train consists of 13 coaches :

- 1 AC II Tier
- 1 AC III Tier
- 4 Sleeper coaches
- 3 Second Class sitting
- 4 General
- 1 Luggage/parcel van

== Traction ==
As of 16 October 2026 the trains are being hauled by WAP-7 Electric Locomotive.

Both trains were hauled by a New Guwahati shed's WDP-4D diesel locomotive and it got upgraded by NFR to electric locomotive.
