= Kaziranga Superfast Express =

Train in India

Guwahati-SMVT Bangaluru Superfast Express

Overview
- Service type: Superfast Express
- Locale: Assam, Bihar, West Bengal, Odisha, Andhra Pradesh, Tamil Nadu & Karnataka
- First service: 1 November 1988; 38 years ago
- Current operator: Northeast Frontier Railway

Route
- Termini: Guwahati (GHY); SMVT Bengaluru (SMVB)
- Stops: 39
- Distance travelled: 2,973 km (1,847 mi)
- Average journey time: 52 hrs 30 mins
- Service frequency: Tri-weekly
- Train number: 12509 / 12510

On-board services
- Classes: AC 2 Tier, AC 3 Tier, Sleeper class, General Unreserved
- Seating arrangements: Yes
- Sleeping arrangements: Yes
- Catering facilities: Available
- Observation facilities: Large windows
- Baggage facilities: Available
- Other facilities: Below the seats

Technical
- Rolling stock: LHB coach
- Track gauge: 1,676 mm (5 ft 6 in)
- Operating speed: 56 km/h (35 mph) average including halts.
Route map
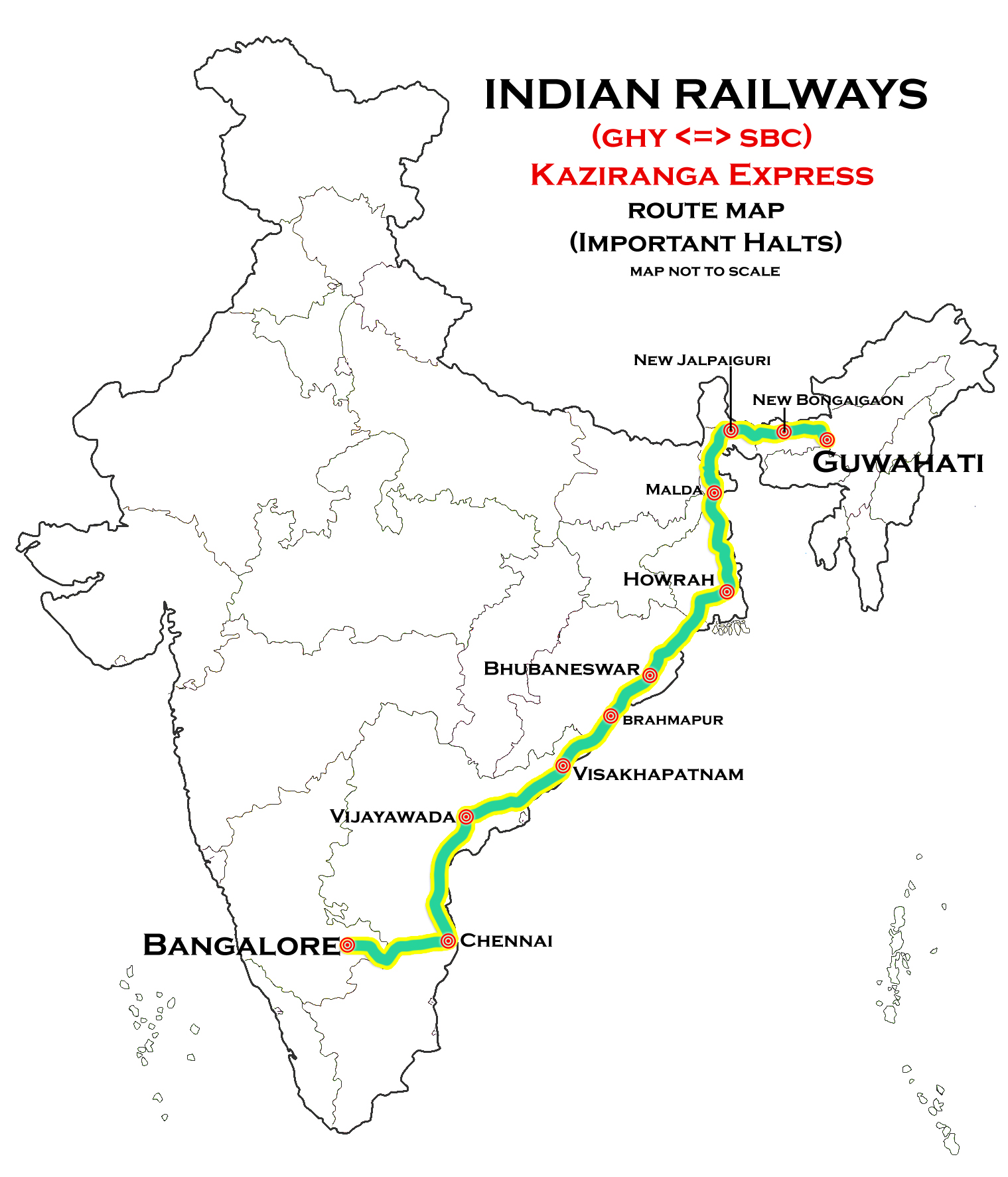

The 12509 / 12510 Guwahati-SMVT Bangaluru Superfast Express is a Superfast express train operated by Northeast Frontier Railway zone that runs between Guwahati and Bengaluru the capital of Karnataka in India via Rampurhat, Malda Town, New Jalpaiguri. It is currently being operated with 12509/12510 train numbers on tri-weekly basis.

== Overview ==
The train is very common train in this route. It runs thrice in a week and passes through important states such as Assam, West Bengal, Bihar, Odisha, Andhra Pradesh, Tamil Nadu and Karnataka. The train also passes through Pakur district of Jharkhand but it does not have the stoppage there.

The 12510/Guwahati–Sir M. Visvesvaraya Terminal Superfast Express has an average speed of 56 km/h and covers 2973 km in 52h 30m. The 12509/SMVT Bengaluru –Guwahati Superfast Express has an average speed of 55 km/h and covers the same distance in 53h 55m.

== Timings ==
The train departs from Platform 7 of Guwahati at 6:20 IST, every Sun, Mon and Tue and arrives at Platform 1 of Sir M. Visvesvaraya Terminal at 11:40 IST, every Tue, Wed and Thu.

From Platform 1 of SMVT Bangalore Terminal, the train departs at 23:40 IST, every Wed, Thu and Fri and arrives at Platform 3 of Guwahati at 6:00 IST, every Sat, Sun and Mon.

== Classes ==
It is one of the non-Rajdhani/Humsafar/AC Expresses which consists of a large number of AC coaches. The train usually consists of a massive load of 24 standard ICF coach. Sometimes one or two High Capacity Parcel Vans are attached with it:

- 2 AC Two Tier
- 7 AC Three Tiers
- 10 Sleeper classes
- 2 General (unreserved)
- 1 Pantry car
- 2 Seating (Ladies/Disabled) cum Luggage Rakes.

As is customary with most other train services in India, coach composition may be amended at the discretion of Indian Railways, depending on demand.

== Coach composition ==
Guwahati–SMVT Bangalore:

Loco	1	2	3	4	5	6	7	8	9	10	11	12	13	14	15	16	17	18	19	20	21	22	23	24	25	26
	SLR	HCP	HCP	S1	S2	S3	B1	B2	A1	B3	B4	A2	B5	B6	B7	PC	S4	S5	S6	S7	S8	S9	S10	GEN	GEN	SLR

Bangalore–Guwahati:

Loco	1	2	3	4	5	6	7	8	9	10	11	12	13	14	15	16	17	18	19	20	21	22	23	24	25	26
	SLR	HCP	HCP	S1	B1	B2	A1	B3	B4	B5	B6	B7	A2	S2	S3	S4	PC	S5	S6	S7	S8	S9	S10	GEN	GEN	SLR

== Traction ==
- Earlier with ICF rakes this train runs with WAP-4 and WDP-4D or WAP-7
- As the route of Northeast Frontier Railway is fully electrified, a Siliguri Loco Shed-based WAP-7 or WAP-4 electric locomotive hauls the train from Guwahati to Visakhapatnam.
- It reverses its direction at Visakhapatnam and gets a Vijayawada or royapuram based WAP-7 and WAP-4 electric locomotive for the way up to SMVT Bengaluru.

== Route and halts ==
The stoppages of this train are as follows:

ASSAM (06 Stops)

1. Guwahati Railway Station (Starts)
2. Kamakhya
3. Barpeta
4. Rangiya Junction
5. New Bongaigaon Junction
6. Kokrajhar

WEST BENGAL (10 Stops)

1. New Alipurduar
2. New Cooch Behar
3. Dhupguri
4. Jalpaiguri Road
5. New Jalpaiguri (Siliguri)
6. Malda Town
7. New Farakka Junction
8. Rampurhat Junction
9. Bolpur Shantiniketan
10. Dankuni
11. Kharagpur Junction

BIHAR (02 Stops)

1. Kishanganj
2. Barsoi

ODISHA (08 Stops)

1. Balasore
2. Bhadrak
3. Jajpur Keonjhar Road
4. Cuttack Junction
5. Bhubaneswar
6. Khurda Road Junction
7. Balugaon
8. Brahmapur

ANDHRA PRADESH (06 Stops)

1. Palasa
2. Srikakulam
3. Vizianagaram Junction
4. Visakhapatnam
5. Rajahmundry
6. Vijayawada Junction

TAMIL NADU (04 Stops)

1. Perambur (Chennai)
2. Arakkonam Junction
3. Katpadi Junction
4. Jolarpettai Junction

KARNATAKA (03 Stops)

1. Bangarapet Junction
2. Krishnarajapuram
3. Sir M. Visvesvaraya Terminal, Bangalore (Ends).

Note:

- The train also passes through Sahibganj district and Pakur district of Jharkhand but it does not have any stoppage there.
- Bold letters depicts Major Railway Stations.

== Direction reversals ==
This train reverses its direction once at;

- Visakhapatnam

== Incidents ==
On 1 May 2014 at Chennai Central railway station the 2014 Chennai train bombing incident took place. Two low-intensity blasts occurred in two coaches S4 and S5 of the stationary 12509 - Guwahati–Bangalore Cantt. Superfast Express, killing one female passenger and injuring at least fourteen.

== See also ==
- Nagaon Express
- Chennai–New Jalpaiguri SF Express
- Dibrugarh–Tambaram Express
- Thiruvananthapuram–Silchar Superfast Express
- Bangalore Cantonment–Agartala Humsafar Express
- Dibrugarh–Kanyakumari Vivek Express
- Yesvantpur–Kamakhya AC Superfast Express
