= Dibrugarh–Chandigarh Express =

Train in India

Overview
- Service type: Express
- First service: 7 December 2009; 16 years ago
- Current operator: Northeast Frontier Railway

Route
- Termini: Dibrugarh (DBRG); Chandigarh (CDG)
- Stops: 33
- Distance travelled: 2,639 km (1,640 mi)
- Average journey time: 56 hrs 20 mins
- Service frequency: Bi-Weekly
- Train number: 15903 / 15904

On-board services
- Classes: AC 2 Tier, AC 3 Tier, Sleeper class, General Unreserved
- Seating arrangements: Yes
- Sleeping arrangements: Yes
- Catering facilities: Available
- Observation facilities: Large windows
- Baggage facilities: Available
- Other facilities: Below the seats

Technical
- Rolling stock: LHB coach
- Track gauge: 1,676 mm (5 ft 6 in); Broad Gauge
- Operating speed: 46 km/h (29 mph) average including halts.
Route map
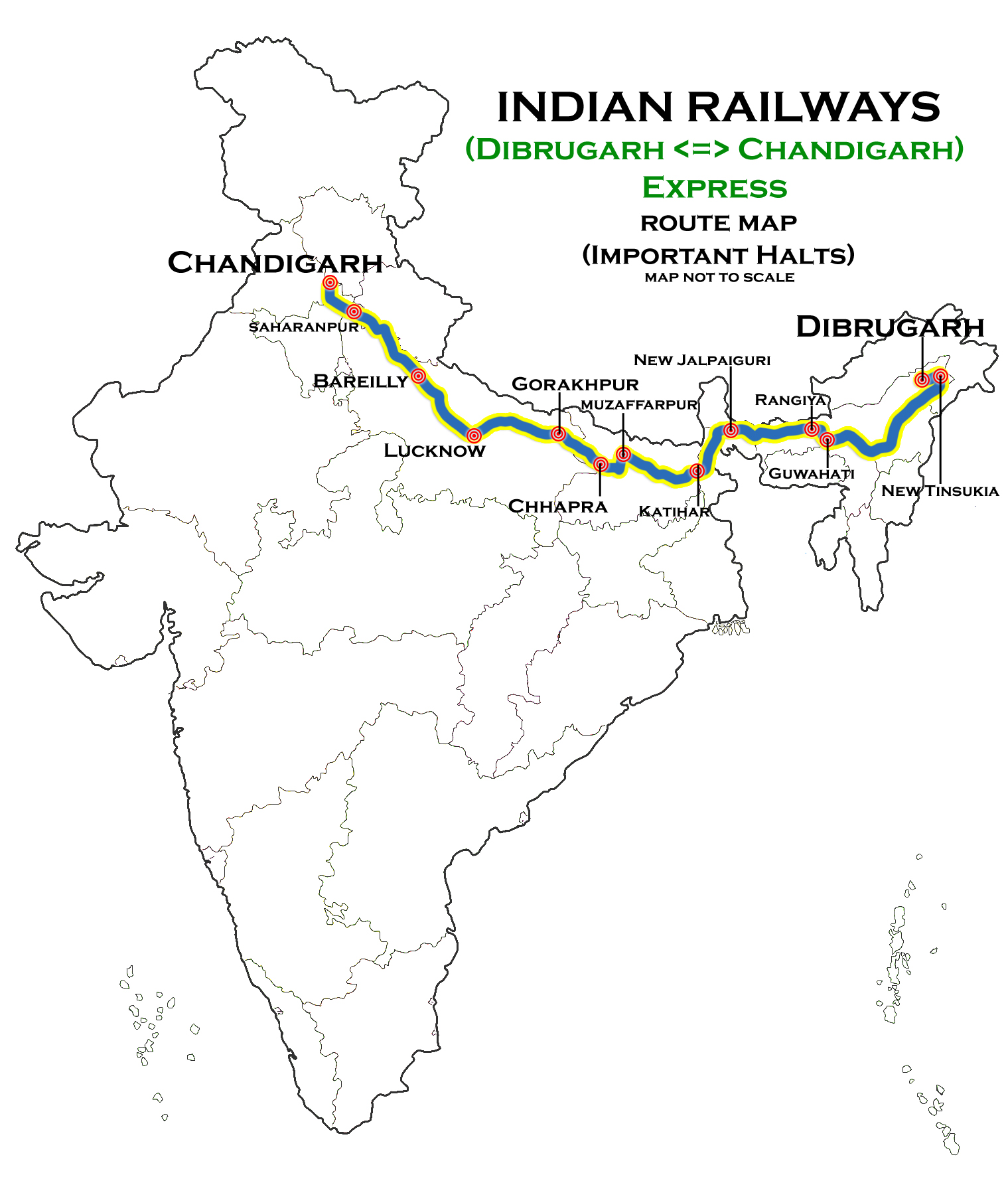

The 15903 / 15904 Dibrugarh–Chandigarh Express is a weekly Express train which connects Chandigarh the capital of Punjab and Haryana in the North with the Tea City of India, Dibrugarh in Assam in the East.

== Schedule ==
| Train number | Station code | Departure station | Departure time | Departure day | Arrival station | Arrival time | Arrival day |
|---|---|---|---|---|---|---|---|
| 15903 | DBRG | Dibrugarh | 7:00 AM | MON FRI | Chandigarh Junction | 1:15 PM | WED SUN |
| 15904 | CDG | Chandigarh Junction | 11:15 PM (Night) | SUN WED | Dibrugarh | 8:15 AM | WED SAT |

== Rake sharing ==
The train shares its rake with 15929/15930 New Tinsukia–Tambaram Express.

== Route and halts ==
- Dibrugarh
- New Tinsukia Junction
- Simaluguri Junction
- Mariani Junction
- Furkating Junction
- Lumding Junction
- Guwahati
- Dimapur
- New Bongaigaon Junction
- New Alipurduar
- New Cooch Behar Junction
- New Jalpaiguri
- Katihar Junction
- Barauni Junction
- Muzaffarpur Junction
- Hajipur Junction
- Chhapra Junction
- Siwan Junction
- Gorakhpur Junction
- Gonda Junction
- Lucknow Charbagh
- Moradabad Junction
- Saharanpur Junction
- Ambala Cantonment
- Chandigarh Junction

== Traction ==
- Dibrugarh to Guwahati,

Siliguri Loco Shed-based WDP-4 / WDP-4D diesel locomotive.

- Guwahati to Chandigarh,

Ghaziabad Loco Shed-based WAP-7 or DDU Loco Shed based WAP-4 electric locomotive.

== Coach composition ==
The train has LHB rakes with max speed of 130 kmph.

- 1 AC II Tier
- 4 AC III Tier
- 13 Sleeper coaches
- 2 General
- 2 Second-class Luggage/parcel van

| Loco | 1 | 2 | 3 | 4 | 5 | 6 | 7 | 8 | 9 | 10 | 11 | 12 | 13 | 14 | 15 | 16 | 17 | 18 | 19 | 20 | 21 | 22 |
|---|---|---|---|---|---|---|---|---|---|---|---|---|---|---|---|---|---|---|---|---|---|---|
| | SLR | GEN | S1 | S2 | S3 | S4 | S5 | S6 | S7 | S8 | S9 | S10 | S11 | S12 | S13 | B1 | A1 | B2 | B3 | B4 | GEN | EoG |

Now this train runs with LHB COACH from DIBRUGARGH to CHANDIGARH via GUWAHATI, NEW JALPAIGURI, KATIHAR, SAMASTIPUR JN (also it is drm office along with rail factory and diesel locomotive maintenance yard), MUZAFFARPUR JN, CHHAPRA JN, GORAKHPUR JN, SAHARANPUR JN.
