= Dibrugarh Town railway station =

Railway station in Assam, India

Dibrugarh Town

General information
- Location: RKB Path, Dibrugarh, Assam; India
- Coordinates: 27.4779°N 94.8998°E
- Elevation: 108 metres (354 ft)
- System: Indian Railways station
- Owner: Indian Railways
- Operator: Northeast Frontier
- Platforms: 3
- Tracks: 6
- Connections: Auto stand

Construction
- Structure type: At grade
- Parking: No
- Cycle facilities: No

Other information
- Status: Functioning
- Station code: DBRT
- Zone(s): Northeast Frontier
- Division(s): Tinsukia
Location
- Location within Assam Location within India

Dibrugarh Town Railway Station is the Oldest station in Northeast, India. Its code is DBRT. It serves Dibrugarh City and second most busiest station after Dibrugarh railway station(DBRG). The station consists of three platforms. The is well developed and support many facilities including foot-over bridges, well sheltered platform, food, water etc.
