= Lumding–Dibrugarh section =

Railway section in India

Lumding–Dibrugarh section (including Tinsukia–Ledo, Tinsukia–Dangari, Dimapur–Tizit & Dhansiri–Kohima branch lines)
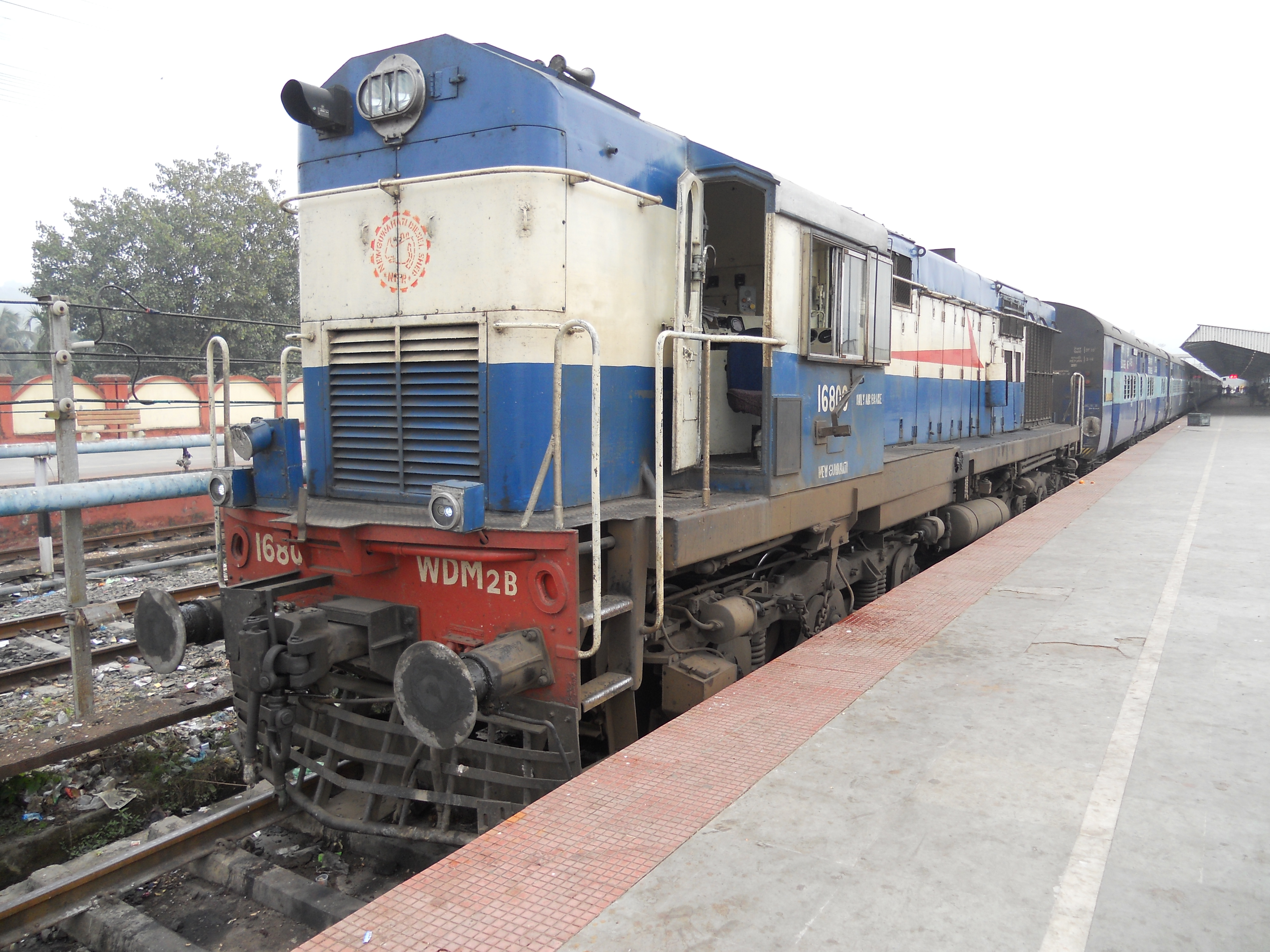
- Nagaland Express runs on Lumding–Dibrugarh section

Overview
- Status: Operational
- Owner: Indian Railways
- Locale: Assam, Nagaland
- Termini: Lumding; Dibrugarh

Service
- Operator(s): Northeast Frontier Railway

History
- Opened: 1903

Technical
- Line length: 380 km (236 mi)
- Number of tracks: 1
- Track gauge: 5 ft 6 in (1,676 mm) broad gauge
- Electrification: Ongoing
- Operating speed: 100 km/h (62 mph)

The Lumding–Dibrugarh section is a broad-gauge railway line connecting Lumding and Dibrugarh. The 380-kilometre (240 mi) long railway line is functional in the Indian state of Assam. It is under the jurisdiction of Northeast Frontier Railway. Dibrugarh is a newly made Junction station to connect Pasighat. The old Dibrugarh Town station is 5-kilometre (3.1 mi) away from Dibrugarh.

== Route & Branch Routes ==
The Lumding–Dibrugarh Mainline section goes via Dimapur, Furkating, Mariani, Amguri, Simaluguri, Duliajan, New Tinsukia & is 380-kilometre (240 mi) long. The branch route of Furkating-Jorhat-Mariani goes via Golaghat, Numaligarh, Bhalukmara, Jorhat & Cinnamara & is 86-kilometre (53 mi) long. The branch route of Simaluguri to Dibrugarh goes via Shivasagar(Sibsagar Town) & Moranhat & is 96-kilometre (60 mi). Amguri - Tuli section of 14.65-kilometre (9.10 mi) was closed for being Meter Gauge but now is made Broad Gauge. Simaluguri - Naginimora section of 16.9-kilometre (10.5 mi) was permanently closed for being Meter Gauge but now set to be revived in Broad Gauge as Amguri-Naginimora 31-kilometre (19 mi) long line. The branch route of New Tinsukia - Ledo section is 58-kilometre (36 mi) long. It goes further 2.5-kilometre (1.6 mi) uptill Tirap Gaon, Ledo also known as Tirap Colliery. During Meter Gauge era the line used to go uptill Lekhapani, 6.5-kilometre (4.0 mi) from Tirap. Lekhapani station was closed in 1997 & was restored in 2009 but as a Monument. The Branch route of Makum-Dangari is 28.5-kilometre (17.7 mi) & during Meter Gauge era it used to go further 9-kilometre (5.6 mi) uptill Siakhoa Ghat.

== History ==
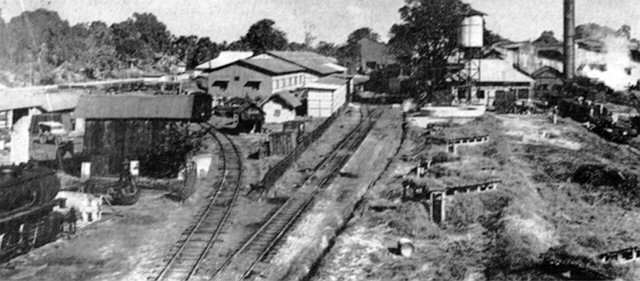
Dibrugarh Railway Yard, 1943

The Assam Railway and Trading Company Limited was incorporated in 1881. The first metre-gauge locomotive was put into service in Assam in 1882. The 64-kilometre (40 mi)-long line from Dibrugarh steamer ghat to Makum was opened to passenger traffic on 16 July 1883. The objective of opening an isolated railway in upper Assam was to link the tea gardens and coalfields to the steamer ghats.

In the latter part of the 19th century, the Dibru–Sadiya railway was 149-kilometre (93 mi) long. The 1,000 mm (3 ft 3 3/8 in)-wide metre-gauge railway track earlier laid by Assam Bengal Railway from Chittagong to Lumding was extended to Tinsukia on the Dibru–Sadiya line in 1903. The Mariani–Furkating line was operated by Jorhat-Provincial Railway. In 1937, the British also planned Guwahati-Dhaka line in Meter Gauge which was slated to connect Guwahati with Dewanganj Upazila(Bangladesh) as Dewangaunge was already connected with Dhaka via Mymensingh by a 259-kilometre (161 mi) long Meter Gauge line. The 323-kilometre (201 mi) long Railway Guwahati-Dewanganj project was scrapped in 1943 owing to Second World War & Indian National Army defeating the British.

The project for the conversion of the entire Lumding–Dibrugarh section from metre gauge to 5 ft 6 in (1,676 mm) broad gauge was completed by the end of 1995.

The Guwahati–Lumding–Dibrugarh line was proposed to be doubled in the Railway Budget for 2016–17. The 123-kilometre (76 mi)-long Dimapur–Zubza–Kohima new line project has the status of a National Project. Final location survey has been completed for the entire project. As of 2012, surveys are underway for 6 km (4 mi)-long line from Tirap to Lekhapani and 31 km (19 mi)-long line from Lekhapani to Kharsang in Arunachal Pradesh. Survey for 344 km (214 mi)-long new line from Nagaon to Sibsagar Town was completed in 2010–11. Survey was completed for doubling of 527 km (327 mi)-long line from Digaru to Dibrugarh. Survey is in progress for 190 km (118 mi)-long new line from Dimapur to Tizit. Survey was completed for 31 km (19 mi) long new line from Amguri to Naginimora. The survey for 9 km (6 mi)-long new line from Tuli to Tuli Town has been shelved.
