= New Tinsukia–Amritsar Express =

New Tinsukia-Amritsar Express

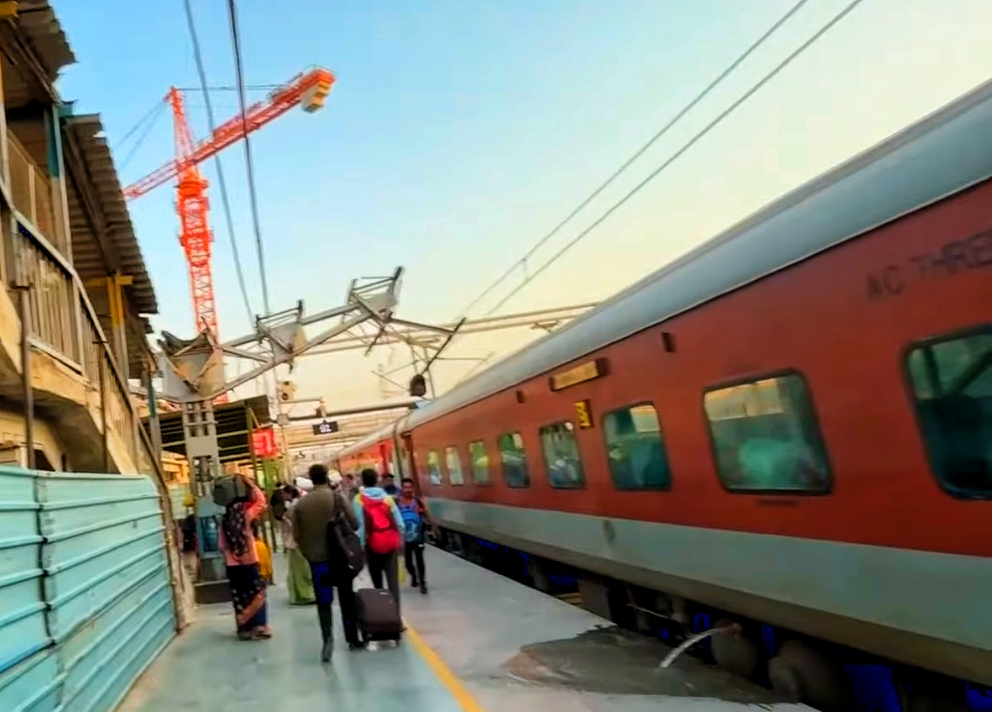
- New Tinsukia-Amritsar Express At Ludhiana Junction

Overview
- Service type: Express
- Status: Operating
- Locale: Assam, Nagaland, West Bengal, Bihar, Uttar Pradesh, Haryana and Punjab.
- First service: 16 December 2003
- Current operator: Northeast Frontier Railway

Route
- Termini: New Tinsukia (NTSK); Amritsar (ASR)
- Stops: 32
- Distance travelled: 2853 km
- Average journey time: 62 hours and 5 mins
- Service frequency: Weekly
- Train number: 15933/15934

On-board services
- Classes: AC 2 Tier (2A), AC 3 Tier (3A), Sleeper (SL)
- Seating arrangements: Available
- Catering facilities: Available
- Baggage facilities: Available

Technical
- Rolling stock: LHB coach
- Track gauge: Broad gauge
- Operating speed: 46 km/h
Route map
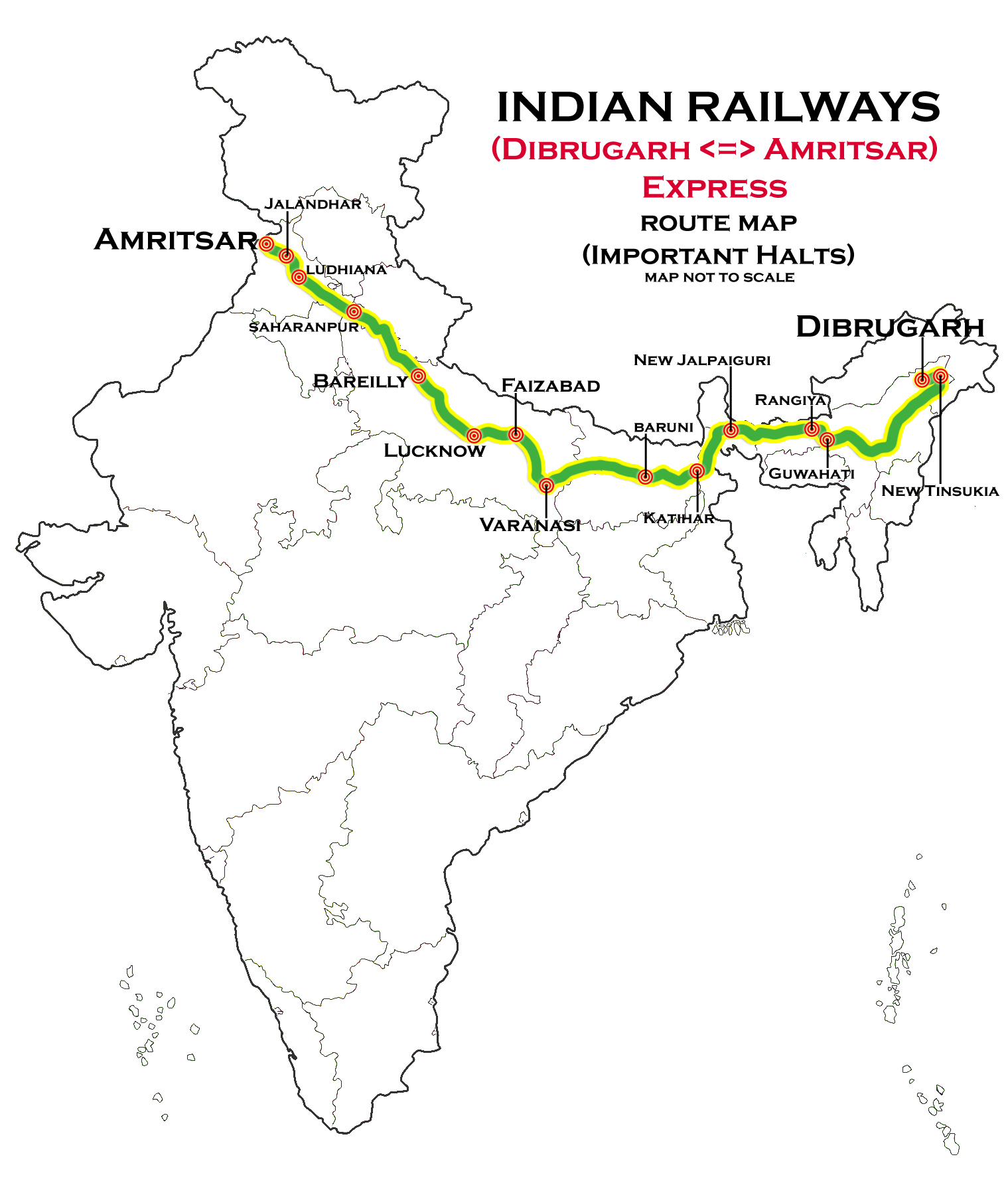
- New Tinsukia–Amritsar Express route map

The New Tinsukia–Amritsar Express is a weekly Express train that connects Tinsukia, the easternmost town of Assam in the east with the "Golden city" Amritsar in the north.

== Timetable ==
Train no. 15933, the New Tinsukia to Amritsar leaves New Tinsukia every Tuesday at 07:00 hours and reaches Amritsar every Thursday at 21:05 hours. Train no. 15934 from Amritsar to New Tinsukia leaves Amritsar every Friday at 15:45 hours and reaches New Tinsukia every Monday at 04:55 hours traveling a distance of 2853.5 kilometres in 61 hours and 10 minutes.

== Route and halts ==
ASSAM

- New Tinsukia (Starts)
- Simaluguri Junction
- Mariani Junction
- Furkating Junction
- Lumding Junction
- Guwahati
- New Bongaigaon Junction

NAGALAND

- Dimapur

WEST BENGAL

- New Alipurduar
- New Cooch Behar Junction
- New Jalpaiguri (Siliguri)

BIHAR

- Katihar Junction
- Khagaria Junction
- Barauni Junction
- Desari
- Hajipur Junction
- Chhapra Junction

UTTAR PRADESH

- Ballia
- Ghazipur City
- Varanasi Junction
- Akbarpur Junction
- Ayodhya
- Lucknow Charbagh
- Shahjahanpur
- Bareilly Junction
- Moradabad Junction
- Saharanpur Junction

HARYANA

- Ambala Cantonment

PUNJAB

- Ludhiana Junction
- Jalandhar City Junction
- Beas Junction
- Amritsar (Ends)

== Traction ==
- New Tinsukia to Amritsar,

Electric Loco Shed, Ghaziabad-based WAP-7 locomotive.

== See also ==
- New Jalpaiguri - Amritsar Clone Superfast Express
- New Jalpaiguri–Amritsar Karmabhoomi Express
