= Nagaland Express =

Overview
- Service type: Express
- Status: Operating
- Locale: Assam, Nagaland
- First service: 15 November 2011; 15 years ago (service to Dimapur); 2020 (extended to Dibrugarh Town)
- Current operator: Northeast Frontier Railway

Route
- Termini: Guwahati (GHY); Dibrugarh Town (DBRT)
- Stops: 23
- Distance travelled: 558 km (347 mi)
- Average journey time: 13 hours 55 minutes
- Service frequency: Daily
- Train number: 15669 / 15670

On-board services
- Classes: AC 2 tier, AC 3 tier, sleeper 3 tier, unreserved
- Sleeping arrangements: Yes

Technical
- Track gauge: Broad gauge
- Operating speed: 40 km/h (25 mph) average with halts
Route map
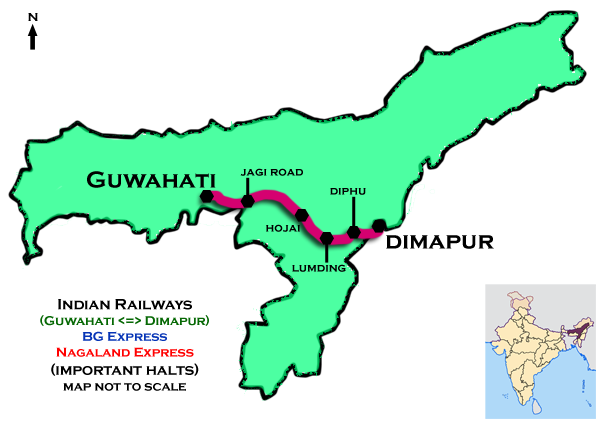

The Nagaland Express is a daily Express train which runs between Guwahati railway station in Guwahati, the capital city of Assam and Dibrugarh Town in Upper Assam. Earlier, the train ran between Guwahati and Dimapur. From 2020, it was extended to Dibrugarh Town, in the same year when Guwahati–Dibrugarh Shatabdi Express was cancelled.

== Name ==
The train is named after the state of Nagaland, located in northeastern India.

== Timetable ==
- From Guwahati to Dibrugarh Town (train number 15669) - departure from Guwahati (GHY) 20:45 IST; arrival at Dibrugarh Town (DBRT) 10:40 IST
- From Dibrugarh Town to Guwahati (15670)- departure from Dibrugarh Town (DBRT) 13:40 IST; arrival at Guwahati (GHY) 03:40 IST

== Coaches ==
the train consists of 24 coaches : 2 unreserved class

4 AC II Tier

4 AC III Tier

14 Sleeper III tier

== Traction ==
It is hauled by WAP-7 electric locomotive from May 2026 since the route has now been fully electrified. All the previously hauled diesel loco and ALOCOs remains memory.
