= Dibrugarh–Kanniyakumari Vivek Express =

Train in India

Dibrugarh – Kanniyakumari Vivek Express

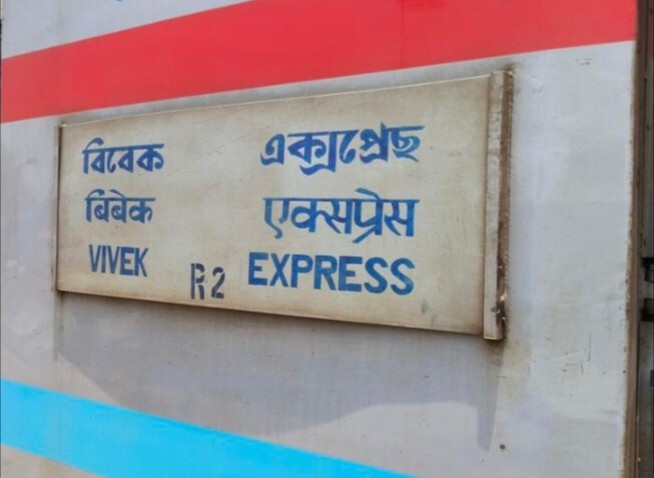

Overview
- Service type: Vivek Express
- Locale: Assam, Nagaland, West Bengal, Bihar, Jharkhand, Odisha, Andhra Pradesh, Kerala & Tamil Nadu
- First service: 19 November 2011; 15 years ago
- Current operator: Northeast Frontier Railway

Route
- Termini: Dibrugarh (DBRG); Kanniyakumari (CAPE)
- Stops: 57
- Distance travelled: 4,154 km (2,581 mi)
- Average journey time: 75h 30m
- Service frequency: Daily
- Train number: 22503 / 22504

On-board services
- Classes: AC 2 Tier, AC 3 Tier, Sleeper Class, General Unreserved
- Disabled access: Disabled access
- Seating arrangements: Yes
- Auto-rack arrangements: Yes
- Catering facilities: Available
- Observation facilities: Large windows
- Entertainment facilities: Yes
- Baggage facilities: Available
- Other facilities: Large windows

Technical
- Rolling stock: LHB coach
- Track gauge: 1,676 mm (5 ft 6 in)
- Operating speed: 69 km/h (43 mph) average including halts.
- Rake sharing: N/A (8 dedicated rakes)
Route map
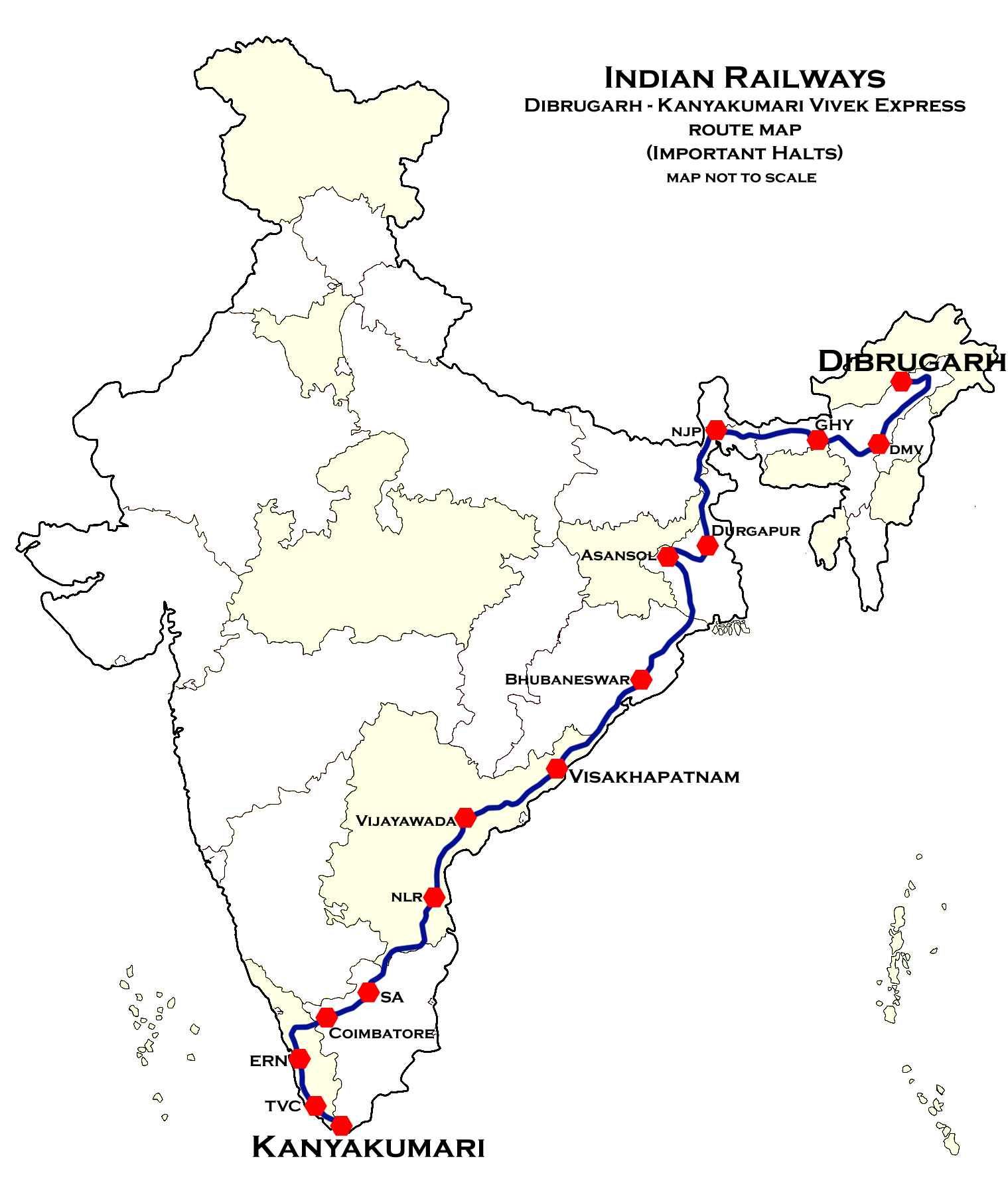
- Dibrugarh - Kanniyakumari Vivek Express Route map

The 22503 / 22504 Dibrugarh –Kanniyakumari - Dibrugarh Vivek Superfast Express is a Daily Superfast Express train of the Vivek Express series belonging to Indian Railways and operated by Northeast Frontier Railway which runs from Dibrugarh in India's north eastern state Assam to Kanniyakumari in Tamil Nadu the southernmost state of India via Guwahati, New Bongaigaon Junction, New Jalpaiguri, Malda Town, Rampurhat, Kharagpur. In 74 hours 35 minutes the train covers a distance of 4,189 kilometres (2,603 mi) and traverses through eight states in India. This train is currently the longest train route in India by both distance and time, as well as the 30th-longest train service in the world. The train has 57 halts across its route.

== History ==
Vivek Express is a series of four Express Trains on the Indian Railways network. These trains were announced in the Railway Budget of 2011-12 by the then Railway Minister Mamata Banerjee. These trains were started to commemorate the 150th birth anniversary of Swami Vivekananda.

Vivek express also holds another place in the history of Indian railways, as being the last train to halt its services, when the entire Indian railway passenger services came to standstill following the COVID19 pandemic and the subsequent nationwide lockdown in March 2020.

Dibrugarh - Kanniyakumari Vivek Express joins Dibrugarh in Assam, North-East India to Kanniyakumari, Tamil Nadu which is the southernmost tip of India.

== Schedule ==
The train no: 22504 starts from Dibrugarh at 7:55 PM and reaches Kanniyakumari at 9:55 PM on the fourth day of journey. In the return direction the train no: 22503 leaves Kanniyakumari at 5:25 PM and reaches Dibrugarh at 8:50 PM on the fourth day of the journey. This train runs through Assam, Nagaland, West Bengal, Bihar, Odisha, Andhra Pradesh, Kerala and Tamil Nadu. This train also passes through Sahibganj district and Pakur district of Jharkhand but it does not have any stoppages there.

== Important halts ==
Some important halts of this train are :

Tinsukia, Guwahati , New Bongaigaon Jn., New Jalpaiguri (Siliguri) , Malda Town , Rampurhat , Dankuni (Kolkata), Kharagpur , Cuttack, Bhubaneswar , Brahmapur, Vizianagaram, Visakhapatnam , Rajahmundry, Vijayawada, Renigunta, Katpadi, Salem, Erode, Coimbatore, Palakkad], Ernakulam, Thiruvananthapuram , Nagercoil etc.

== Coach composition ==
The train runs with LHB coaches. The coach composition is :

Loco	1	2	3	4	5	6	7	8	9	10	11	12	13	14	15	16	17	18	19	20	21	22
ENG	EOG	GEN	GEN	S1	S2	S3	S4	S5	S6	S7	PC	B1	B2	B3	B4	B5	B6	A1	A2	GEN	GEN	SLR

== Locomotive ==
The train is hauled by WDP-4D Locomotive of Diesel Loco Shed, Siliguri from New Tinsukia to Guwahati. Then it is hauled by WAP-7 Locomotive of Electric Loco Shed, Visakhapatnam from Guwahati up to Visakhapatnam. Lastly from Visakhapatnam to Kanniyakumari it is hauled by WAP-7 locomotive of Electric Loco Shed, Royapuram even it can hauled by Ludhiana and Andal-based WDG-3A.

== See also ==
- Vivek Express
- Kanniyakumari Terminus railway station
- Dibrugarh railway station
- Himsagar Express
- Longest train services
- Longest train services of Indian Railways
- Tambaram–Guwahati Express
- Bangalore-Guwahati Express
- Thiruvananthapuram–Silchar Superfast Express
- New Tinsukia-Bengaluru Express
- Bangalore-Agartala Humsafar Express
- Chennai–New Jalpaiguri Superfast Express
- Yesvantpur–Kamakhya AC Superfast Express
