= Kamrup Express =

Train in India

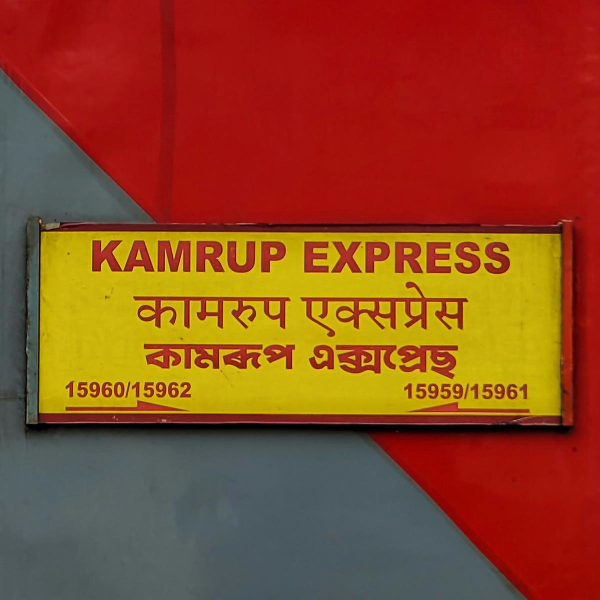
- Kamrup Express train board

Overview
- Service type: Express
- Locale: Assam and West Bengal
- First service: 15959 / 15960 (1 July 1975, 50 years ago) 15961 / 15962 (27 December 2020, 4 years ago)
- Current operator: Northeast Frontier Railway

Route
- Termini: Howrah (HWH); Dibrugarh (DBRG) (previously Dibrugarh Town (DBRT))
- Stops: 52(15959/15960) & 42(15961/62)
- Distance travelled: 15959 / 15960 1,536.7 kilometres (954.9 mi) 15961 / 15962 1,354.5 kilometres (841.6 mi)
- Average journey time: 15959 / 15960 - 33 hours 00 minutes (average) 15961 / 15962 - 28 hrs 30 minutes (average)
- Service frequency: Daily
- Train number: 15959 / 15960 (via Guwahati) 15961 / 15962 (via Rangapara North)

On-board services
- Classes: AC 2 Tier, AC 3 Tier, sleeper class, unreserved
- Seating arrangements: Yes
- Sleeping arrangements: Yes
- Catering facilities: Available (paid)
- Baggage facilities: Available

Technical
- Rolling stock: LHB coach
- Track gauge: 1,676 mm (5 ft 6 in) broad gauge
- Operating speed: 46 kilometres per hour (29 mph) for 15959/15960 & 48 kilometres per hour (30 mph) for 15961/15962
Route map
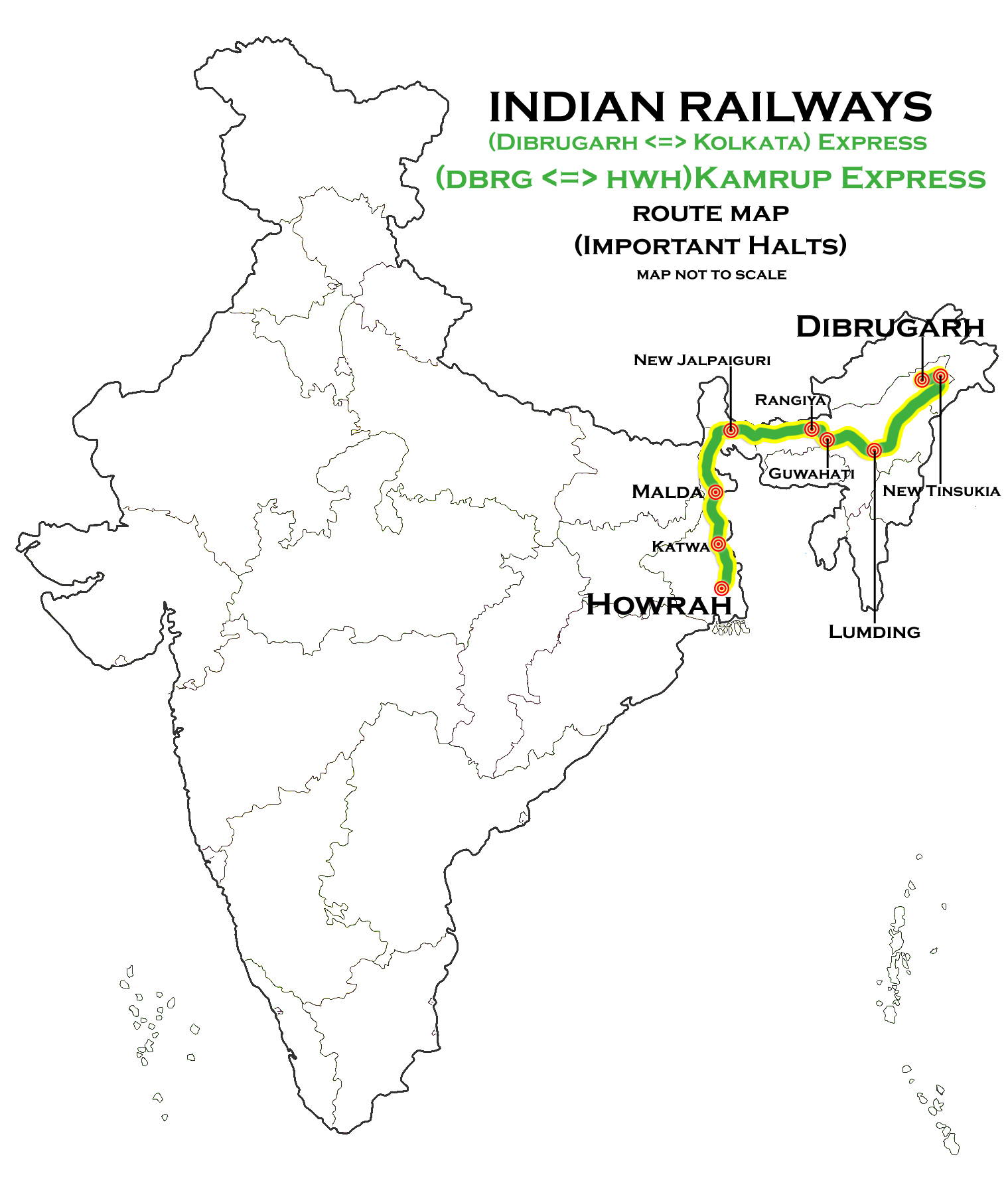

Kamrup Express is a daily Express train which connects Kolkata, the capital of the state of West Bengal with Dibrugarh, a major tea manufacturing town in upper Assam. The name Kamrup is derived from the Kamrup district, one of the 35 administrative regions of the State of Assam. The train is operated by the North East Frontier Railway zone of Indian Railways and has two dedicated services, namely 15959 / 15960 via Guwahati and 15961 / 15962 via Rangapara North.

== History ==
When introduced on 1 July 1975, broad gauge line did not reach Guwahati & was till New Bongaigaon. After 1992, Kamrup Express is travelling Howrah to Dibrugarh directly.

Following the inauguration of the Bogibeel Bridge, which significantly reduced travel time between Lower Assam and Upper Assam by at least eight hours, Indian Railways opted to reroute certain trains operating between Dibrugarh via this new route. As a result, the 15959/15960 Dibrugarh – Howrah Kamrup Express was re-routed as 15961 / 15962 via this route every Monday and Friday from Howrah and Dibrugarh, respectively. This service was inaugurated on 27 December 2020 from Dibrugarh and on 28 December 2020 from Howrah.

== Coach composition ==
The train has LHB rakes with max speed of 130 km/h. However, it has a MPS of 110 km/h due to section conditions.

The train has both AC and non-AC accommodation, and one pantry car.

- 1 AC II Tier
- 3 AC III Tier
- 11 sleeper coaches
- 3 general
- 1 pantry car
- 2 generator car

Loco	1	2	3	4	5	6	7	8	9	10	11	12	13	14	15	16	17	18	19	20	21	22
	EOG	GEN	S1	S2	S3	S4	S5	S6	S7	S8	S9	S10	S11	PC	B1	B2	B3	A1	GEN	GEN	EOG	HCPV

== Locomotive ==
15959/15960 is still being hauled by a Diesel Loco Shed, Siliguri-based WDP-4D locomotive from Dibrugarh to Guwahati. An Electric Loco Shed, Howrah-based WAP-7 locomotive completes the journey from Guwahati to Howrah and vice versa. Since electrification reached Dibrugarh, an electric locomotive will be used soon.

15961/15962 is hauled by a Diesel Loco Shed, Siliguri-based WDP-4D locomotive from Dibrugarh to Rangiya and an Electric Loco Shed, Howrah-based WAP-7 locomotive completes the journey from Rangiya to Howrah and vice versa.
