= Dimapur railway station =

Railway station in Nagaland, India

Dimapur

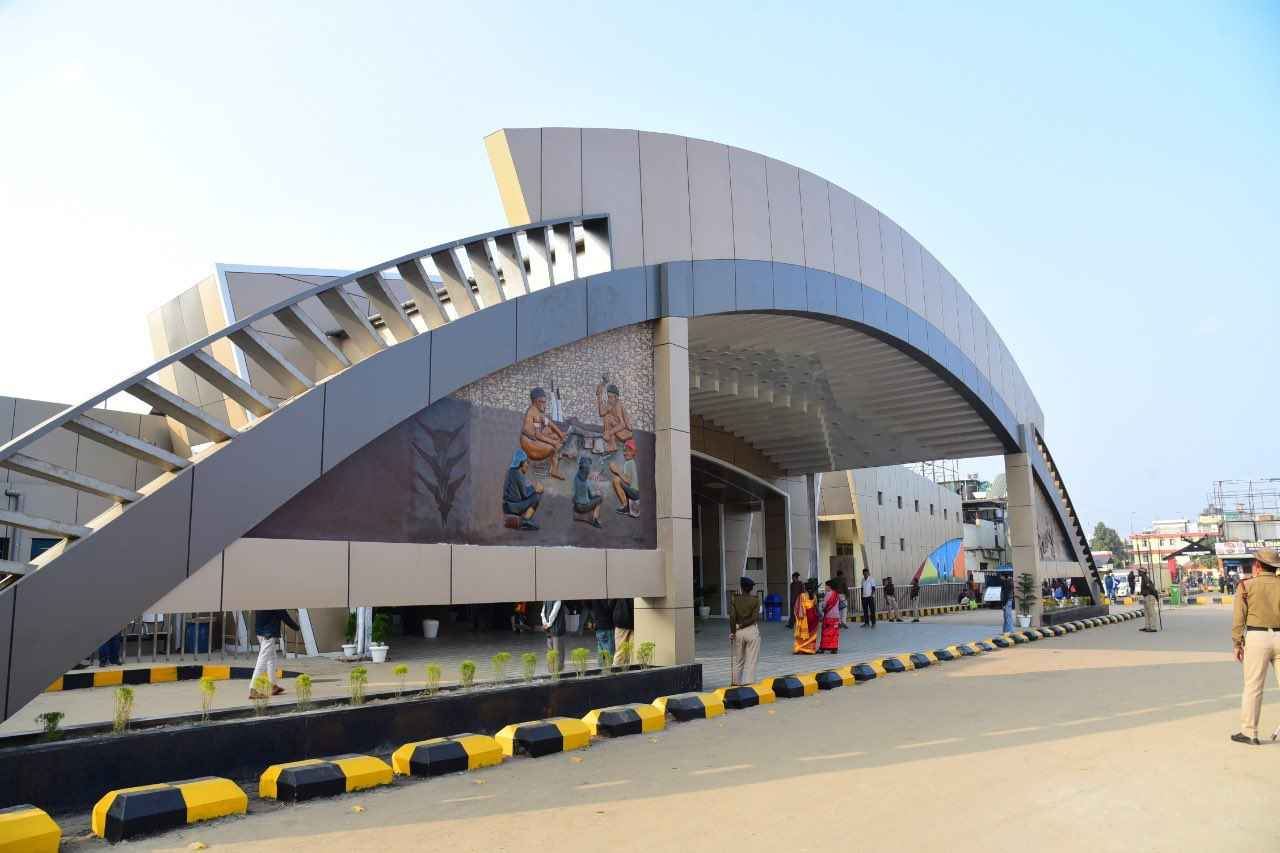
- Dimapur Railway Station Complex

General information
- Location: Railway Station Road, Civil Hospital Colony, Dimapur, Nagaland; India
- Coordinates: 25°54′21″N 93°43′42″E
- Elevation: 154 metres (505 ft)
- System: Regional Rail & Light Rail station
- Owner: Indian Railways
- Operator: Northeast Frontier Railway
- Line: Lumding–Dibrugarh section
- Platforms: 3
- Tracks: 5
- Connections: Cabs, Auto-rickshaw

Construction
- Structure type: At grade
- Parking: Available
- Cycle facilities: Unavailable
- Accessible: Yes

Other information
- Status: Functioning
- Station code: DMV
- Zone(s): Northeast Frontier
- Division(s): Lumding

History
- Opened: 1903
- Former names: Manipur Road
Location
- Location within Nagaland

Dimapur Railway Station is a railway station on the Lumding–Dibrugarh section. It is located in Dimapur District in the Indian state of Nagaland. It serves Dimapur and its surrounding areas.

== History ==
The 1,000 mm (3 ft 3 3/8 in)-wide metre-gauge railway earlier laid by Assam Bengal Railway from Chittagong to Lumding was extended to Tinsukia on the Dibru–Sadiya line in 1903.

The project for the conversion of the Lumding–Dibrugarh section from metre gauge to 5 ft 6 in (1,676 mm) broad gauge was completed by the end of 1997.

== Major trains ==
- 15603/15604 Guwahati–Ledo Intercity Express
- 12423/12424 Dibrugarh Rajdhani Express
- 15909/15910 Avadh Assam Express

== Under-construction line to Kohima ==
As of July 2020, the Dhansiri–Zubza line to Kohima is expected to be completed by March 2023.

The 123-kilometre (76 mi)-long Dimapur–Zubza–Kohima new line project has the status of a National Project. Final location survey has been completed for the entire project.

As of August 2019, the 25% work on the 82.5 km line from Dhansiri to Zubza near state capital Kohima has been completed, railway has requested the Nagaland govt to expedite the land acquisition process which is holding up progress on this rail link.

== Future extension ==
The Chinese government has proposed to Myanmar to connect the existing Myitkyina railhead in North Myanmar on China–Myanmar border to west to Zubza/Dimapur railhead in Nagaland of India, and to east to Dehong Dai and Jingpo Autonomous Prefecture in Yunnan of China.

== Amenities ==
Dimapur railway station has two four-bedded retiring rooms and a four-bedded dormitory.

== See also ==
- List of railway stations in Nagaland
- North Eastern Railway Connectivity Project
- North Western Railway zone

Preceding station	Indian Railways	Following station
Rangapahar Crossing towards ?	Northeast Frontier Railway zone Lumding–Dibrugarh section	Khotkhoti towards ?
