= Barbil =

Barbil Badabil
- Town
- Location in Odisha, India Barbil (India)
- Coordinates: 22.12°N 85.40°E
- Country: India
- State: Odisha
- District: Keonjhar
- Named for: Barbil

Government
  - Type: Municipality

Area
  - Total: 165 km^{2} (64 sq mi)
- Elevation: 1,077 m (3,533 ft)

Population (2017)
  - Total: 300,000
  - Rank: 15th
  - Density: 1,978/km^{2} (5,120/sq mi)

Languages
  - Official: Odia
- Time zone: UTC+5:30 (IST)
- PIN: 758035
- Telephone code: 06767
- Vehicle registration: OD-09
- Sex ratio: 967 ♂/♀
- Website: odisha.gov.in

Barbil is a town and a municipal council in the Kendujhar district (also known as Iron Town) of the state of Odisha, India. The region around Barbil has one of the largest deposits of iron ore and manganese ore in the world. It is a major source of revenue generation for both the central and the state governments.

According to sources, 45% to 48% ST and SCs are living here. It is a fifth scheduled area under the constitution of India.

== Geography ==
Barbil is located at 22.12°N 85.40°E. It has an average elevation of 477 m (1,565 ft). Barbil is fully surrounded by hills. The Kiriburu range runs parallel to it. The surrounding hills are densely forested with predominantly Sal trees. The close proximity to forest has led to several incidents of wild elephants being spotted in the town.

== Climate ==
Barbil has, like all of Odisha, a tropical savanna climate (Köppen Aw). It nonetheless has lower average temperatures than most of the state because of higher elevation. Summer afternoons remain sweltering, but winter mornings can be quite cool.

Climate data for Barbil, Odisha
Month	Jan	Feb	Mar	Apr	May	Jun	Jul	Aug	Sep	Oct	Nov	Dec	Year
Mean daily maximum °C (°F)	25.6 (78.1)	28.1 (82.6)	33.2 (91.8)	37.3 (99.1)	39.0 (102.2)	34.9 (94.8)	29.8 (85.6)	29.6 (85.3)	30.0 (86.0)	29.3 (84.7)	27.1 (80.8)	25.3 (77.5)	30.8 (87.4)
Mean daily minimum °C (°F)	11.2 (52.2)	13.5 (56.3)	17.9 (64.2)	22.5 (72.5)	25.4 (77.7)	25.0 (77.0)	23.7 (74.7)	23.5 (74.3)	23.2 (73.8)	20.3 (68.5)	14.5 (58.1)	10.8 (51.4)	19.3 (66.7)
Average rainfall mm (inches)	12 (0.5)	25 (1.0)	25 (1.0)	20 (0.8)	56 (2.2)	201 (7.9)	354 (13.9)	370 (14.6)	237 (9.3)	65 (2.6)	11 (0.4)	2 (0.1)	1,378 (54.3)
Source: "Barbil climate: Weather Barbil & temperature by month". Climate data for cities worldwide.

== Demographics ==
Historical population
Year	Pop.	±%
1961	19,340	—
1971	24,342	+25.9%
1981	33,030	+35.7%
1991	42,032	+27.3%
2001	52,627	+25.2%
2011	66,540	+26.4%
Source: Census of India

According to the 2011 India census, Barbil had a population of 66,540. Males constitute 53% of the population and females 47%. Barbil has an average literacy rate of 72.18%. 16% of the population is under 6 years of age. An additional 50,000 people come to Barbil for work. According to sources, 45% to 48% ST and SCs are living here.

Religions in Barbil Town (M):
1. Hinduism 56,072 (84.3%)
2. Islam 6,651 (10.00%)
3. Christianity 2,133 (3.21%)
4. Sikhism 1,585 (2.38%)
5. Buddhism 36 (0.05%)
6. Jainism 11 (0.02%)
7. Other religion 13 (0.02%)
8. Not Stated 39 (0.06%)

== Administrations ==
Tahasildar and Executive Magistrate

== Economy ==
The economy of Barbil is reliant on the iron ore mining industry and steel manufacturing industry. The iron ore mines in the Barbil - Joda region cater to some of the largest steel plants of India like Tata Steel Jamshedpur, SAIL Bokaro and Rourkela.

== Transport ==
Barbil Railway Station under Chakradharpur division is on a byline in the Tatanagar–Bilaspur section of the Howrah-Nagpur-Mumbai line connecting the mainline at Rajkharshavan station which is about 100 km (62 mi) from Barbil. Barbil is connected to Howrah, Bhubaneshwar, Puri, and Tatanagar by train. Jan Shatabdi Express runs from Howrah to Barbil and one passenger train from Barbil to Tatanagar on a daily basis 58103/Tatanagar - Barbil Passenger (UnReserved) - Tatanagar to Barbil SER/South Eastern Zone - Railway Enquiry.

Barbil is also connected to Bhubaneshwar & Puri by a daily-running Barbil-Puri Intercity Express train. Rourkela - Barbil Intercity Express (Daily) via Chakradharpur, Rajkharswan, Chaibasa Dongoaposi, Jhinkpani at one can extend the journey to Rourkela or even Sambalpur Vizag Chennai Alleppy, etc. towards the south and Bilaspur Nagpur Mumbai towards West and also via Keonjhar Kendujhar. Jajpur Road, Cuttack Bhubaneshwar for connecting trains. (Puri-Barbil).

== Social activities ==
Organizations in Barbil include Barbil Haalchal, Native Voice, Barbil Bikash Parisad, and N.D.C.C.

== Places of interest ==
Murga Mahadev is a temple beside a picturesque waterfall, dedicated to Lord Shiva.
