= Mayiladuthurai–Coimbatore Jan Shatabdi Express =

Train in India

Mayiladuthurai Junction - Coimbatore Junction Jan Shatabdi Express

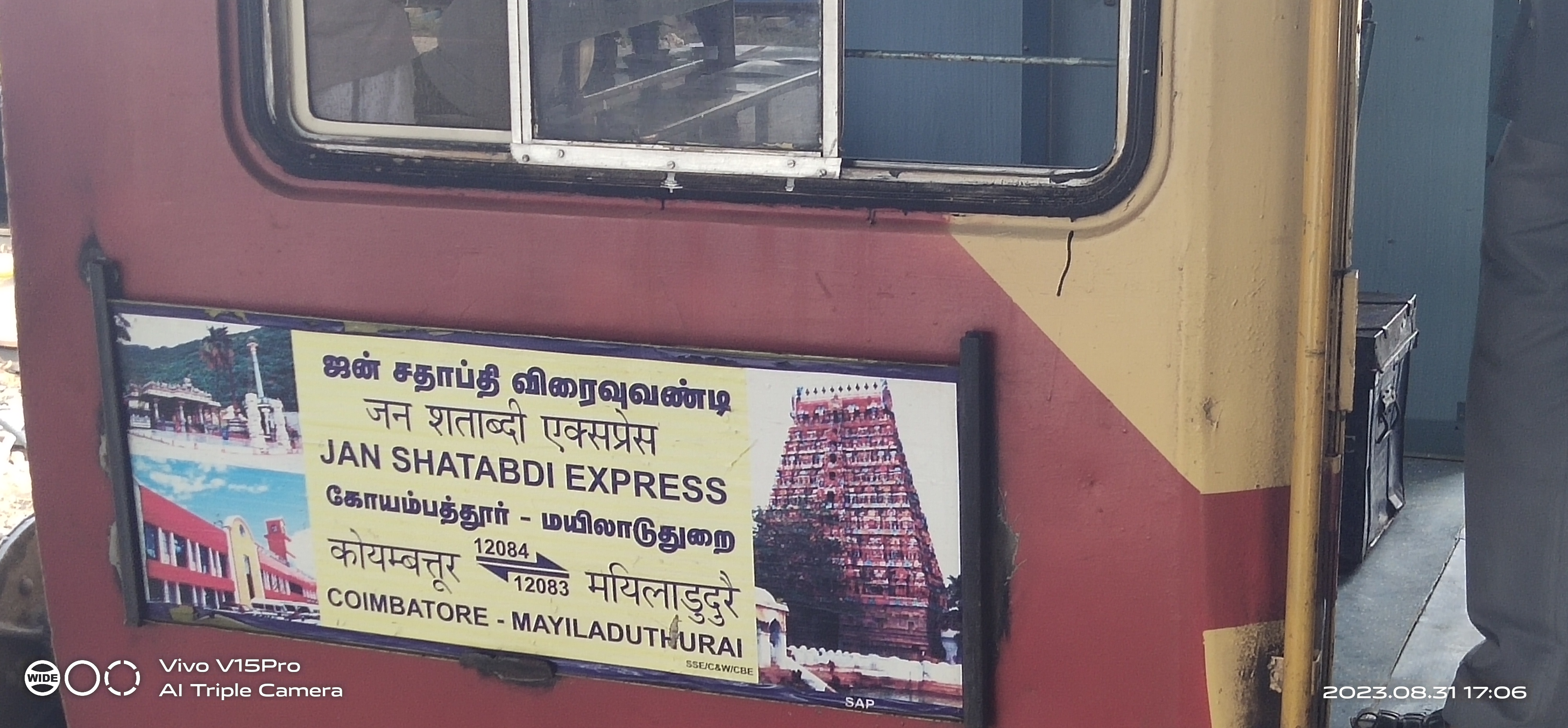

Overview
- Service type: Jan Shatabdi Express
- Locale: Tamil Nadu
- First service: 20 January 2003; 23 years ago
- Current operator: Southern Railway

Route
- Termini: Coimbatore Junction (CBE); Mayiladuthurai Junction (MV)
- Stops: 8
- Distance travelled: 362 km (225 mi)
- Average journey time: 6 hours 20 minutes
- Service frequency: Six days a week (Note: Except Tuesdays.)
- Train number: 12083 / 12084

On-board services
- Classes: Chair Car, Second Class Seating General Unreserved
- Disabled access: Disabled access
- Seating arrangements: Yes
- Sleeping arrangements: No
- Auto-rack arrangements: Overhead racks
- Catering facilities: Yes
- Observation facilities: Large Windows
- Entertainment facilities: No
- Baggage facilities: Yes

Technical
- Rolling stock: LHB coach
- Track gauge: 1,676 mm (5 ft 6 in)
- Operating speed: 67 km/h (42 mph) average including halts.
- Rake maintenance: Coimbatore Junction
Route map
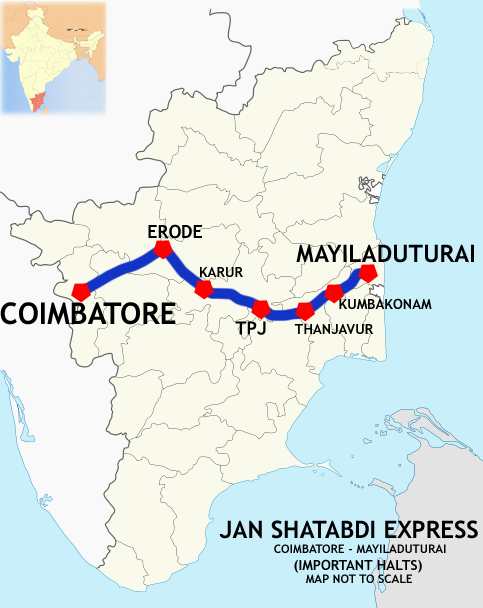
↓ 12084 • 12083 ↑

The Mayiladuthurai–Coimbatore Jan Shatabdi Express is a Jan Shatabdi Express train connecting Mayiladuthurai Junction and Coimbatore Junction in Tamil Nadu, India. The passenger service is one among the twenty Jan Shatabdi Express trains in India other than Chennai Central–Vijayawada Jan Shatabdi Express that runs within Tamil Nadu.

== Overview ==
This passenger service was introduced under Jan Shatabdi Express, and had its inaugural run on 20 January 2003 between Thanjavur Junction and Coimbatore Junction in Tamil Nadu, India, flagged-off by then Union Minister of State for Railways, A. K. Moorthy, as a trial service for a limited period of three months. Apart from the Chennai Central–Vijayawada Jan Shatabdi Express running within Tamil Nadu, this service is one among twenty Jan Shatabdi Express trains in India.

== Service ==
During June 2004, the Southern Railway zone announced that the service would run until 15 July 2004. As the service initially received poor patronage the railways were forced to operate the service in reverse direction viz. Coimbatore–Thanjavur expecting a better response. During Railway Budget 2005–2006, Lalu Prasad Yadav, the then Minister of Railways announced the extension of service up to Kumbakonam pending gauge conversion. The service was once again extended to Mayiladuthurai Junction, as announced during Railway Budget 2008–2009 by Lalu Prasad Yadav, the then Minister of Railways pending gauge conversion. The service initially numbered as 2083 / 2084 was changed to 12083 / 12084 since December 2010 onwards as a part of train management system over the entire Indian Railways network.

== Rakes ==
Loco	1	2	3	4	5	6	7	8	9	10	11	12	13	14	15	16	17	18	19	20	21	22
	EoG	D1	D2	D3	D4	D5	D6	D7	D8	D9	D10	D11	D12	D13	D14	D15	D16	D17	D18	C1	C2	SLR

== Route ==
This Jan Shatabdi Express service initially originated from Thanjavur Junction to Coimbatore Junction via Tiruchirappalli Junction and Erode Junction with single rake halting back at Thanjavur Junction, had to reverse the point of service owing to poor patronage. Despite extension of service, the train originating in Coimbatore Junction traverses through Irugur Junction, Tiruppur, Erode Junction, Karur Junction, Tiruchirappalli Junction, where it reverses the loco and proceeds to Thanjavur Junction, Kumbakonam and the final destination, Mayiladuthurai Junction. The service follows the same route and pattern during the return journey too. (Note: The schedule and routes are subject to change for administrative reasons.)

== Developments ==
As a part of Go Green initiative, of the 6 chosen non-Air conditioned coach of this passenger train, one bearing No.CZ026256 was fitted with 16 solar photovoltaic panels capable of producing 300 W (0.40 hp) each and aggregating up to 4.8 kW (6.4 hp). Built at a cost of ₹3.9 lakh (US$4,200), the solar panels are designed to be capable of withstanding wind velocities, vibrations and shocks while the train is running, and enough to power all the fans and lights in the coach in addition to saving 1,700 L (370 imp gal; 450 US gal) of diesel per coach for every year. Thus becoming the first train in Southern Railway zone and South India as well to be fully operated with solar powered coaches. Being primarily maintained at Carriage and Works Depot in Coimbatore Junction under Salem railway division, the train is one among the others to have retro fitment of Biotoilets at a cost of ₹4.13 lakh (US$4,400) for each coach.

== See also ==
- Chennai Central Vijayawada Jan Shatabdi Express
- Raigarh Gondia Jan Shatabdi Express
- Thiruvananthapuram-Kozhikode Jan Shatabdi Express
- Kannur Jan Shatabdi Express
- Patna-Ranchi Jan Shatabdi Express
- Howrah-Patna Jan Shatabdi Express
