= Rourkela–Barbil Intercity Express =

Express train in India

Rourkela - Barbil Intercity Express
Overview
- Service type: Express
- First service: 15 July 2012
- Last service: Before COVID
- Current operator: East Coast Railway zone

Route
- Termini: Rourkela Junction; Barbil
- Stops: 4
- Distance travelled: 123 km (76 mi)
- Average journey time: 3 hours 5 mins
- Service frequency: Daily
- Train number: 18403 / 18404

On-board services
- Classes: general unreserved, Chair car
- Seating arrangements: Yes
- Sleeping arrangements: Yes
- Catering facilities: No
- Observation facilities: Rake Sharing with 18415 / 18416 Puri–Barbil Express

Technical
- Rolling stock: Standard Indian Railways Coaches
- Track gauge: Wide gauge
- Operating speed: 45 km/h (28 mph)

The 18403 / 04 Rourkela - Barbil Intercity Express was an Express train belonging to Indian Railways East Coast Railway zone that runs between Rourkela Junction and Barbil in India.

It was operated as train number 18403 from Rourkela Junction to Barbil and as train number 18404 in the reverse direction serving the states of Jharkhand & Odisha.

It was started as Chakradharpur–Barbil Intercity Express on 15 July 2012, After 8 Feb 2019 it was extended up to Rourkela and runs as Rourkela–Barbil Intercity Express. and as COVID enters India the train get terminated fully

== Coaches ==
The 18403 / 04 Rourkela - Barbil Intercity Express has one AC chair car, one Chair car, eight general unreserved and two SLR (seating with luggage rake) coaches. It does not carry a pantry car coach.

As is customary with most train services in India, coach composition may be amended at the discretion of Indian Railways depending on demand.

== Service ==
The 18403 Rourkela Junction - Barbil Intercity Express covers the distance of 123 km (76 mi) in 2 hours 35 mins (48 km/h) and in 2 hours 55 mins as the 18404 Barbil - Chakradharpur Intercity Express (42 km/h).

As the average speed of the train is lower than 55 km/h (34 mph), as per railway rules, its fare doesn't include a Superfast surcharge.

== Routing ==
The 18403 / 04 Rourkela - Barbil Intercity Express runs from Rourkela Junction via Chakradharpur, Chaibasa, Danguwapasi to Barbil.

== Traction ==
As the route is electrified, a Santragachi Junction based WAP-4 electric locomotive pulls the train to its destination.
