= Chaibasa =

Chaibasa 𑢯𑣁𑣁𑣆𑣗𑣁𑣁𑣞𑣁𑣁 Chāībāsa
- Town
- Location in Jharkhand, India Chaibasa (India)
- Coordinates: 22.57°N 85.82°E
- Country: India
- State: Jharkhand
- District: Pashchimi Singhbhum
- Lok Sabha Constituency: Singhbhum
- Assembly Constituency: Chaibasa (52)

Government
  - Type: Municipal governance in India
  - Body: Chaibasa Nagar Parishad
  - Municipal Chairperson: Shri Nitin Prakash
  - MP: Joba Majhi (JMM)
  - MLA: Deepak Birua (JMM)
  - Superintendent of Police: Shri Amit Renu (IPS)
  - District Magistrate: Shri Manish Kumar (IAS)

Area
  - Town: 9.200 km^{2} (3.552 sq mi)
- Elevation: 222 m (728 ft)

Population (2011)
  - Town: 69,565
  - Density: 7,561/km^{2} (19,580/sq mi)
  - Metro: 155,954
- Demonym(s): Chaibasite, Chaibasian

Languages
  - Official Language: Ho, Hindi
  - Other important: Odia, Bengali
- Time zone: UTC+5:30 (IST)
- PIN: 833201
- Vehicle registration: JH-06
- Website: www.chaibasa.nic.in

Chaibasa ( Τσάι μπάσα, 𑢯𑣁𑣁𑣆𑣗𑣁𑣁𑣞𑣁𑣁, चाईबासा ) is a town and a municipality in West Singhbhum district in the state of Jharkhand, India. Chaibasa is the district headquarters of West Singhbhum district. It is also the headquarter of Singhbhum Kolhan division headed by the Divisional commissioner. It consists of the main city including Sadar Bazar, Garikhana, Bari Bazar, Amla Tola, Sentola, Railway Station Area, JMP Chowk, Post Office Chowk and Gandhi Tola; and the surrounding suburbs and entry gates to the city including Tambo Chowk, Tungri, Khapparsai, Moholsai, Gutusai and Purana Chaibasa.

== History ==
The region around Chaibasa has a long record of human settlement. Archaeological findings from the wider Singhbhum area include microliths, iron-slag, and pottery fragments carbon-dated to around 1400, suggesting early metal use and habitation. Excavations at Benisagar, approximately 75 kilometres from Chaibasa, have uncovered temple remains, sculptures, and pottery dating between the 5th and 16th centuries CE, indicating the existence of an early urban and religious centre in the region.

Before colonial intervention, the Kolhan region, in which Chaibasa lies, was predominantly inhabited and governed by tribal communities such as the Ho, Munda, and Bhumij peoples. Their political structure was based on the Manki-Munda system, where each village was led by a Munda and clusters of villages were governed by a Manki. This traditional form of governance maintained local autonomy, customary law, and collective ownership of land until it was gradually absorbed into the colonial administration during British expansion in eastern India.

In 1837, British authorities formally annexed the Kolhan region and created the Kolhan Government Estate, with Chaibasa designated as its administrative centre. The British Political Agent Thomas Wilkinson introduced Wilkinson’s Rules, which brought the tribal territories under indirect colonial governance while maintaining limited recognition of local customs. During this period, the British also began to establish institutions for education and administration. In 1841, a government Anglo-Hindi school was opened in Chaibasa to educate tribal youth as part of the colonial “civilising” project.

Chaibasa grew into a district headquarters under British rule and was formally recognised as a municipality in 1875. The town later became a centre for regional trade, particularly in agricultural and mineral products, due to its proximity to mineral-rich zones of Singhbhum.

After Indian independence in 1947, the district of Singhbhum underwent several administrative reorganisations. On 16 January 1990, the district was officially bifurcated to form West Singhbhum, with Chaibasa continuing as its headquarters. Since then, Chaibasa has developed as the administrative, educational, and economic hub of the region while retaining its unique tribal cultural identity.

== Geography ==
Chaibasa is located at 22.57°N 85.82°E. It has an average elevation of 222 metres. It is located 140 km south of state capital Ranchi, 25 km from Chakradharpur, and 65 km from Jamshedpur.

=== Climate ===
Climate data for Chaibasa (1981–1999, extremes 1901–2020)
Month	Jan	Feb	Mar	Apr	May	Jun	Jul	Aug	Sep	Oct	Nov	Dec	Year
Record high °C (°F)	33.3 (91.9)	37.3 (99.1)	42.2 (108.0)	45.0 (113.0)	46.7 (116.1)	46.1 (115.0)	41.1 (106.0)	39.6 (103.3)	36.7 (98.1)	36.6 (97.9)	34.4 (93.9)	31.1 (88.0)	46.7 (116.1)
Mean daily maximum °C (°F)	25.4 (77.7)	28.7 (83.7)	33.6 (92.5)	38.3 (100.9)	38.0 (100.4)	34.3 (93.7)	31.3 (88.3)	31.0 (87.8)	30.9 (87.6)	30.4 (86.7)	27.8 (82.0)	25.6 (78.1)	31.3 (88.3)
Mean daily minimum °C (°F)	11.8 (53.2)	14.8 (58.6)	19.2 (66.6)	23.5 (74.3)	25.4 (77.7)	25.6 (78.1)	25.0 (77.0)	25.0 (77.0)	24.3 (75.7)	21.0 (69.8)	15.8 (60.4)	11.9 (53.4)	20.3 (68.5)
Record low °C (°F)	4.4 (39.9)	6.2 (43.2)	11.6 (52.9)	14.9 (58.8)	18.3 (64.9)	17.6 (63.7)	21.1 (70.0)	19.4 (66.9)	20.0 (68.0)	13.9 (57.0)	6.9 (44.4)	5.0 (41.0)	4.4 (39.9)
Average rainfall mm (inches)	11.2 (0.44)	20.1 (0.79)	23.7 (0.93)	36.2 (1.43)	75.6 (2.98)	213.5 (8.41)	239.7 (9.44)	294.2 (11.58)	213.9 (8.42)	98.4 (3.87)	14.2 (0.56)	7.7 (0.30)	1,248.5 (49.15)
Average rainy days	1.0	1.4	1.7	2.1	4.8	9.3	11.8	14.6	11.0	4.3	0.7	0.7	63.3
Average relative humidity (%) (at 17:30 IST)	51	41	35	30	40	64	76	79	75	63	55	50	54
Source: India Meteorological Department

== Demographics ==
Historical population
Year	Pop.	±%
1872	4,641	—
1881	6,001	+29.3%
1891	6,850	+14.1%
1901	8,653	+26.3%
1911	9,009	+4.1%
1921	9,178	+1.9%
1931	10,785	+17.5%
1941	13,052	+21.0%
1951	16,474	+26.2%
1961	22,019	+33.7%
1971	35,385	+60.7%
1981	45,751	+29.3%
1991	56,729	+24.0%
2001	63,648	+12.2%
2011	69,565	+9.3%
Source: Census of India

Religions in Chaibasa (2011)
Religion	Percent
Hindus	59.79%
Muslims	14.43%
Christians	4.60%
Other or persuation	21.18%
Distribution of religions

As of 2011 India census, Chaibasa had a population of 69,565. The total number of householders was 10596. The male population stood at 36273 and the female population at 33292 (with the sex ratio at 100%:91,8%). Chaibasa has an average literacy rate of 86.93%, higher than the national average of 59.5%, with male literacy rate of 91.60% and female literacy rate of 81.83%. Scheduled Castes and Scheduled Tribes make up 6.52% and 25.70% of the population respectively. 12% of the population is under 6 years of age.

Languages of Chaibasa (2011)
1. Hindi (32.6%)
2. Urdu (13.0%)
3. Ho (12.6%)
4. Odia (8.91%)
5. Bengali (8.50%)
6. Kurukh (6.59%)
7. Magahi (3.49%)
8. Bhojpuri (2.42%)
9. Mundari (2.41%)
10. Sadri (1.84%)
11. Marwari (1.70%)
12. Maithili (1.24%)
13. Karmali language (1.03%)
14. Rajasthani (1.01%)
15. Others (2.65%)

Due to its status as an industrial hub, Chaibasa is a very multilingual city. Hindi (32.6%) and Urdu (13.0%) are the most-spoken languages. Ho (12.6%) and Odia (8.9%) are the local languages. Other languages spoken in Chaibasa include Bengali, Magahi, Bhojpuri, Marwari, Sadri, Maithili and Karmali language. Tribal languages spoken include Kurukh and Mundari.

== Education ==
Chaibasa town is home to a variety of educational institutions, ranging from primary and secondary schools to colleges offering higher and professional education.

=== Schools and Secondary Education ===
Chaibasa hosts numerous schools — government, mission, English-medium and vernacular — catering to primary through higher-secondary levels. Best considered schools are following –

- Surajmull Jain Dayanand Anglo–Vedic Public School — It is considered the best school not only in Chaibasa town but also in Pashchimi Singhbhum district. It is affiliated to CBSE board. It offers Modern English-medium education with Vedic education also from classes Bal Vatika (Nursery) to 12th.
- St. Xavier's English School & Junior College — It is also considered one of the best schools in Chaibasa town. It is affiliated to ICSE Board. It offers Modern English-medium Education upto Class 12th.
- St. Viveka English Medium School — It is also considered one of the best schools in Chaibasa town. It is affiliated to CBSE Board. It also offers Modern English-medium Education upto class 10th. It was Established in 1999.

Other schools in Chaibasa include (but are not limited to): Govt. Girls High School; Saraswati Shishu Vidya Mandir; CM School of Excellence Scott Girls; Zila School; Mangilal Rungta +2 School; mission schools; vernacular-medium high and middle schools; other private/public schools in both Hindi and English mediums.

=== Colleges and Higher / Technical Education ===
For higher education and professional courses, Chaibasa includes:

- Chaibasa Engineering College, located about 12 km from town, on a 35-acre campus — offering undergraduate engineering courses (B.Tech) in branches like Civil, Mechanical, Electrical, Electronics & Communication, Computer Science & Engineering, and affiliated to state technical university.
- Other colleges in Chaibasa: Gyan Chand Jain Commerce College, Mahila College, Chaibasa, and Tata College, Chaibasa. These institutions provide undergraduate courses in commerce, arts, and other streams.
- Kolhan University, headquartered in Chaibasa, acts as the affiliating university for many local colleges in the region — thus anchoring tertiary and higher-education governance for the area.

=== Notes on Diversity and Mediums ===
Education in Chaibasa spans both English-medium and vernacular (Hindi / local languages) institutions. This allows students from different linguistic and socioeconomic backgrounds to access schooling.

== Society (NGOs) ==
Both the Indian Red Cross Society and Rotary International have their centers in the municipality. A Howrah Based NGO Margastha Research Foundation also work in this area with the collaboration of Global Achievement Trust.

== Economy ==
Chaibasa is a district headquarters and constitutes all the Governmental offices of the district. Government Institutions are the chief employers of chaibasa. The cement manufacturer ACC Cement Works is situated in Jhinkpani, 18 km from Chaibasa, but relies on Chaibasa itself for daily needs. Substantial mining is done in the area by companies such as S.R. Rungta Group, Thakur Prasad Sao & Sons, Saha Brothers and Anil Khirwal. Many other small-scale steel manufacturing companies are situated in Chaibasa. Lfyd one of the biggest hyperlocal discovery startups of India founded by Satyajeet Patnayak & Dharam Chand Patnaik and currently backed by NASSCOM is registered from Chaibasa.

Chaibasa is located approximately 8 km from Chaliyama, in the adjoining Saraikela Kharsawan district, where the integrated steel plant of Rungta Steel, the flagship company of Rungta Mines Limited, is situated. The steel plant occupies an area of about 933.44 acres and has proposed expansion plans covering an additional 449.09 acres, which would bring the total area to approximately 1,382.53 acres.{{The integrated steel plant at Chaliyama occupies an area of about 933.44 acres, with proposed expansion covering an additional 449.09 acres, bringing the total to approximately 1,382.53 acres. cn|date=January 2026}} The Chaliyama industrial area lies along the banks of the Kharkai River, which flows through the region. The S.R. Rungta Group is headquartered in Chaibasa Town.

Chaibasa's proximity to Jamshedpur and Kolkata contributes to its small scale industrial scape. The most popular economic engines are mining, textiles and the service sector.

Chaibasa not being directly on Howrah-Mumbai main line has hurt its economy quite a lot and all the railway jobs and related industries moved to Chakradharpur which is a smaller town near to it that lies on the main line.

== Tourism ==
Chaibasa and its surroundings offer a mix of small urban parks, temples and access to the extensive Saranda forests and scenic viewpoints in West Singhbhum district.

=== Places of interest ===
- Shaheed Park — A central civic park and memorial maintained by the district administration. The park is popular for evening strolls, events and family outings.
- Rungta Garden — Well-maintained town gardenfrequently visited by local families. Rungta Garden has floral beds, walking paths and seating areas.
- Jubilee Lake Park — Town's biggest park surrounding a lake i.e. Kachahari Talab on Tungri. It is built by Tata Group and is considered one of the best parks in the district. But it's often trolled sometimes for its poor maintenance and cleanliness.
- Lupungutu Spring — Small nearby villages and springs (for example Lupungutu, ~2 km west of Chaibasa) are used as picnic spots by residents and visitors.
- Lutheran Jheel and local temples — Several small lakes and temples, including Hakumatkam Temple and Lutheran Jheel, are local religious and scenic sites often visited during festivals and local fairs.
- Roro Dam, minor waterfalls and lookout points — The district and local listings note a number of small dams, falls and valley viewpoints in and around Chaibasa used for short excursions and birdwatching.

=== Saranda forest (nearby) ===
Chaibasa is also an access point for the Saranda forest (often called the "land of seven hundred hills"), a large sal (Shorea) forested region that features rolling hills, waterfalls, natural caves and several scenic viewpoints. The Saranda area is a significant eco-tourism destination in the district and is reachable by road from Chaibasa; visitors often use Chaibasa as a base for day trips or overnight stays when exploring Saranda.

=== Practical information ===
- Best time to visit: October–March for comfortable weather and clear views; monsoon months make waterfalls fuller but access can be difficult.
- How to reach: Chaibasa is connected by road and rail to regional hubs; the district website and forest department provide local access details for visiting nearby natural attractions.

== Transportation ==
The best-connected place is Jamshedpur which is 60 km away from Chaibasa. The second best place is Chakradharpur, 25 km from Chaibasa on Howrah - Mumbai main line. There are two trains running from Jamshedpur which passes via Chaibasa.

One more train is running from Howrah i.e. Howrah Barbil Jan Shatabdi Express passes via Chaibasa. In 2012, another train from Chakradharpur–Barbil Intercity Express had started passing through Chaibasa which was later extended to Rourkela Junction but had to be closed due to poor ridership.

In 2014, another weekly train started from Visakhapatnam - Tatanagar Weekly Superfast Express which also passes through Chaibasa. Capital of Jharkhand, Ranchi is 145 km away from Chaibasa.

In early 2024, a new weekly train was inaugurated between Anand Vihar Terminal and Puri, passing through Chaibasa. This provided a direct train route to national capital Delhi for the residents.

In the latter half of the year, a new Vande Bharat Train route was inaugurated by Prime Minister Narendra Modi running between Tatanagar and Brahmapur in Odisha passing through Chaibasa.

Chaibasa is a station on the southbound line to Orissa from Rajkharsawan Junction on the Tatanagar–Bilaspur section of Howrah-Nagpur-Mumbai line.

The city does not have a public airport, with the nearest domestic airports being in the state capital Ranchi. While, the well connected international airports are at Kolkata and Bhubaneswar. There are small domestic airports situated close to Chaibasa, in Rourkela and Jamshedpur but they only provide regular flights to Bhubaneswar and Kolkata. There is an abandoned airstrip in the outskirts of the city, last used back in the 1960s.

Chaibasa is situated on the State Highway 5.

== Hungry generation ==
The exponents of famous literary and cultural movement Bhookhi Peedhi or Hungry generation, Samir Roychoudhury resided in this town for several decades after the 1950s.

== Filmography ==
Chaibasa has featured in the Zee TV show Service Wali Bahu.

== See also ==
- Chaibasa (Vidhan Sabha constituency)
- Karaikella
