= Howrah–Barbil Jan Shatabdi Express =

Jan Shatabdi Express train in India

Howrah Junction - Barbil Jan Shatabdi Express

Overview
- Service type: Jan Shatabdi Express
- First service: It replaced Howrah - Tatanagar Shatabdi Express in 2003 and the replaced was Howrah - Rourkela Shatabdi Express between Jul 5, 1995 to Jun 2002 before making the route shorter. Howrah - Tatanagar Jan Shatabdi Express was subsequently extended to Barbil after introduction.
- Current operator: South Eastern Railways

Route
- Termini: Howrah Junction (HWH); Barbil (BBN)
- Stops: 8
- Distance travelled: 397 km (247 mi)
- Average journey time: 6 hours 30 minutes as 12021 Howrah–Barbil Jan Shatabdi Express, 7 hours 15 minutes as 12022 Barbil–Howrah Jan Shatabdi Express.
- Service frequency: Daily service
- Train number: 12021 / 12022

On-board services
- Classes: AC Chair Car, Non AC Chair Car
- Seating arrangements: Yes
- Sleeping arrangements: No
- Auto-rack arrangements: No
- Catering facilities: Onboard catering available
- Observation facilities: Large windows
- Entertainment facilities: No
- Baggage facilities: Overhead racks

Technical
- Rolling stock: LHB coach
- Track gauge: 1,676 mm (5 ft 6 in)
- Electrification: Yes
- Operating speed: 130 km/h (80 mph) maximum 61 km/h (38 mph), including halts

The 12021/22 Howrah–Barbil Jan Shatabdi Express is a superfast express train of the Jan Shatabdi Express series belonging to Indian Railways – South Eastern Railway zone that runs between Howrah Junction and Barbil in India. It replaced Howrah - Tatanagar Shatabdi Express in 2003 and the replaced was Howrah - Rourkela Shatabdi Express between Jul 5, 1995 to Jun 2002 before making the route shorter. Howrah - Tatanagar Jan Shatabdi Express was subsequently extended to Barbil after introduction. Now it operates as train number 12021 from Howrah Junction to Barbil and as train number 12022 in the reverse direction serving the states of West Bengal, Jharkhand and Odisha because Barbil cuts across the state line between Jharkhand and Odisha.

It is part of the Jan Shatabdi Express series launched by the former railway minister of India, Mr. Nitish Kumar in the 2002 / 03 Rail Budget .

== Coaches ==
The 12021 / 22 Howrah–Barbil Jan Shatabdi Express has a LHB Rake with 4 AC Chair Car, 12 Non AC Chair Car, 1 Seating cum Luggage coach and 1 Power Car (EOG) Coach. It does not carry a pantry car.

As is customary with most train services in India, coach composition may be amended at the discretion of Indian Railways depending on demand.

Loco	1	2	3	4	5	6	7	8	9	10	11	12	13	14	15	16	17	18
	EOG	D1	D2	D3	D4	D5	D6	D7	D8	D9	D10	D11	D12	C1	C2	C3	C4	DL1

== Service ==
The 12021 Howrah–Barbil Jan Shatabdi Express covers the distance of 397 km (247 mi) in 6 hours 30 mins (61 km/h) and in 7 hours 15 mins as 12022 Barbil–Howrah Jan Shatabdi Express (55 km/h). The maximum permissible speed of this train is 130 km/h between Rajkharsawan and Andul.

As the average speed of the train is above 55 km/h (34 mph), as per Indian Railways rules, its fare includes a Superfast surcharge.

== Routing ==
The 12021 / 22 Howrah–Barbil Jan Shatabdi Express runs from Howrah Junction via Kharagpur Junction, Jhargram and Ghatsila railway station, Tatanagar Junction, Rajkharsawan Junction, Chaibasa, Dangoaposi to Barbil .

== Traction ==
As the entire route is fully electrified, a Santragachi-based / WAP-7 or Tatanagar-based WAP-7 locomotives powers the train for its entire journey.

== Operation ==
- 12021 Howrah–Barbil Jan Shatabdi Express runs from Howrah Junction on a daily basis arriving Barbil the same day .
- 12022 Barbil–Howrah Jan Shatabdi Express runs from Barbil on a daily basis arriving Howrah Junction the same day .

== Incidents ==
- On 1 August 2009, a gang of armed men had looted the passengers of the AC Chair Car coaches
