= Chaibasa railway station =

Railway station in Jharkhand, India

Chaibasa Railway Station

General information
- Location: National Highway 75, Chaibasa, Jharkhand; India
- Elevation: 227 metres (745 ft)
- System: Indian Railways station
- Owner: Indian Railways
- Operator: South Eastern Railway
- Line: 3
- Platforms: 3
- Tracks: 6

Construction
- Structure type: Standard (on ground station)
- Parking: Yes
- Cycle facilities: Yes
- Accessible: Accessible

Other information
- Status: Triple electric line
- Station code: CBSA
- Zone(s): South Eastern Railway
- Division(s): Chakradharpur railway division
Location

Chaibasa Railway Station is a main railway station in the Chakradharpur division of the South Eastern Railways serving Chaibasa, the district headquarters of West Singhbhum district in Jharkhand. Its code is CBSA. The station consists of three platforms. All the platforms are connected with a well organized railway footbridge, leading to the staff quarters situated on the other side.

The railway station has 4 trains halting which are 20815/20816 Visakhapatnam-Tatanagar SF Express, 12021/12022 Barbil-Howrah Jan Shatabdi Express, 20891 / 20892 Tatanagar–Brahmapur Vande Bharat Express, 2 passenger trains from Tatanagar to Gua and Barbil, and a MEMU between Gua and Tatanagar. Chaibasa, lying on the branch line of the Tatanagar-Bilaspur section of Howrah-Nagpur-Mumbai line, is not well connected with the overall traffic of Indian Railways.

The best connected place is Jamshedpur which is 60 kms away with many halting trains leading to Tatanagar Junction. The second best connected place is Chakradharpur which is 26 kms away. There are many buses and private vehicles leading to Chakradharpur and other satellite villages on the way. It is well connected with Kolkata, thanks to the Barbil-Howrah Jan Shatabdi Express.

The structural upgradation of Chaibasa railway station and addition of a 4th line has been proposed by the Indian Railways for better connectivity.
