= Chilikidara railway station =

Railway Station in Odisha, India

Chilikidara

General information
- Location: Chilikidara, Odisha; India
- Coordinates: 21°14′29″N 85°49′46″E
- System: Indian Railways station
- Owner: Ministry of Railways, Indian Railways
- Line: Howrah–Chennai main line
- Platforms: 2
- Tracks: 2

Construction
- Structure type: Standard (on ground)
- Parking: No

Other information
- Status: Functioning
- Station code: CLDR
- Zone(s): East Coast Railway
- Division(s): Khurda Road
Location
- Location within India Location within Odisha

Chilikidara railway station is a railway station on the East Coast Railway network in the state of Odisha, India. It serves Chilikidara village. Its code is CLDR. It has two platforms. Passenger, MEMU, Express trains halt at Basantapur railway station.

== Major trains ==
- Puri–Barbil Express
- Khurda Road-Kendujhargarh MEMU
- Paradeep-Kendujhargarh MEMU

== See also ==
- Kendujhar district
