= Jhinkpani block =

Jhinkpani
- Community development block
- Location in Jharkhand Jhinkpani (India)
- Coordinates: 22.42°N 85.75°E
- Country: India
- State: Jharkhand
- District: West Singhbhum
- Administrative Headquarters: Jhinkpani

Government
  - Type: Federal democracy

Area
  - Community development block: 124 km^{2} (48 sq mi)

Population (2011)
  - Community development block: 53,792
  - Density: 434/km^{2} (1,120/sq mi)
  - Urban: 13,068
  - Rural: 40,724

Languages
  - Official: Hindi

Native Languages
  - Native Languages: Ho, Santhali
- Time zone: UTC+5:30 (IST)
- PIN: 833215
- Telephone/STD code: 06589
- Vehicle registration: JH 06
- Literacy: 58.23%
- Lok Sabha constituency: Singhbhum
- Vidhan Sabha constituency: Chaibasa
- Website: chaibasa.nic.in

Jhinkpani block is a CD block that forms an administrative division in the Chaibasa Sadar subdivision of West Singhbhum district, in the Indian state of Jharkhand.

== Geography ==
Jhinkpani CD block is bounded by Tonto and Hat Gamharia CD blocks on the north, Manjhari and Kumardungi CD block on the east, Majhgaon CD block on the south, and Jagannathpur and Noamundi CD block on the west.

Jhinkpani CD block has an area of 124 km^{2}. Jhinkpani police station serves Jhinkpani CD block. The headquarters of Jhinkpani CD block is located at Jhinkpani town.

== Demographics ==
=== Population ===
According to the 2011 Census of India, Jhinkpani CD block had a total population of 53,792, of which 40,724 were rural and 13,068 were urban. There were 26,320 (48.9%) males and 27,472 (51.1%) females. Population in the age range 0–6 years was 9,163. Scheduled Castes numbered 2,835 (5.3%) and Scheduled Tribes numbered 32,168 (59.8%).

Gender in Jhinkpani Block
1. Female (51.1%)
2. Male (48.9%)

Census towns in Jhinkpani CD block are (2011 population figure in brackets): Jhinkpani (13,068).

==== Religion ====
Religions in Jhinkpani Block
1. Others/Traditional (57.9%)
2. Hindu (39.0%)
3. Christian (1.18%)
4. Muslims (0.28%)
5. Sikh (0.16%)
6. Buddhism (0.00%)
7. Unknown (1.49%)

Others/Traditional Religion is Most Popular Religion in Jhinkpani and Hinduism is Second Most Population Religion in Jhinkpani.

=== Literacy ===
According to the 2011 census, the total number of literate persons in Jhinkpani CD block was 27,804 (58.23% of the population over 6 years) out of which males numbered 10,962 (58.35% of the male population over 6 years) and females numbered 16,842 (38.69% of the female population over 6 years). The gender disparity (the difference between female and male literacy rates) was 19.66%.

As of 2011 census, literacy in West Singhbhum district was 58.63%. Literacy in Jharkhand was 67.63% in 2011. Literacy in India in 2011 was 74.04%.

== See also ==
- List of Jharkhand districts ranked by literacy rate
