= Tomka railway station =

Railway station on the East Coast Railway network in India

Tomka

General information
- Location: Tomka, Odisha; India
- Coordinates: 21°06′28″N 85°58′33″E
- System: Indian Railways station
- Owner: Ministry of Railways, Indian Railways
- Line: Howrah–Chennai main line
- Platforms: 1
- Tracks: 1

Construction
- Structure type: Standard (on ground)
- Parking: No

Other information
- Status: Functioning
- Station code: TMKA
- Zone(s): East Coast Railway
- Division(s): Khurda Road
Location
- Location within India Location within Odisha

Tomka railway station is a railway station on the East Coast Railway network in the state of Odisha, India. It serves Tomka village. Its code is TMKA. It has one platforms. Passenger, MEMU, Express trains halt at Tomka railway station.

== Major trains ==
- Puri–Barbil Express
- Khurda Road-Kendujhargarh MEMU
- Paradeep-Kendujhargarh MEMU

== See also ==
- Jajpur district
