= Sagadapata railway station =

Railway station on the East Coast Railway network in India

Sagadapata

General information
- Location: Sagadapata, Odisha; India
- Coordinates: 21°14′38″N 85°54′44″E
- System: Indian Railways station
- Owner: Ministry of Railways, Indian Railways
- Line: Howrah–Chennai main line
- Platforms: 2
- Tracks: 2

Construction
- Structure type: Standard (on ground)
- Parking: No

Other information
- Status: Functioning
- Station code: SGDP
- Zone(s): East Coast Railway
- Division(s): Khurda Road
Location
- Location within India Location within Odisha

Sagadapata railway station is a railway station on the East Coast Railway network in the state of Odisha, India. It serves Sagadapata village. Its code is SGDP. It has two platforms. Passenger, MEMU, Express trains halt at Sagadapata railway station.

== Major trains ==
- Puri–Barbil Express
- Khurda Road-Kendujhargarh MEMU
- Paradeep-Kendujhargarh MEMU

== See also ==
- Kendujhar district
