= Tangiriapal railway station =

Railway station on the East Coast Railway network in India

Tangiriapal

General information
- Location: Tangiriapal, Odisha; India
- Coordinates: 21°10′07″N 85°55′23″E
- System: Indian Railways station
- Owner: Ministry of Railways, Indian Railways
- Line: Howrah–Chennai main line
- Platforms: 1
- Tracks: 1

Construction
- Structure type: Standard (on ground)
- Parking: No

Other information
- Status: Functioning
- Station code: TGRL
- Zone(s): East Coast Railway
- Division(s): Khurda Road
Location
- Location within India Location within Odisha

Tangiriapal railway station is a railway station on the East Coast Railway network in the state of Odisha, India. It serves Tangiriapal village. Its code is TGRL. It has one platforms. Passenger, MEMU, Express trains halt at Tangiriapal railway station.

== Major trains ==
- Puri–Barbil Express
- Khurda Road-Kendujhargarh MEMU
- Paradeep-Kendujhargarh MEMU

== See also ==
- Jajpur district
