= Basantapur railway station =

Indian Railway Station

Basantapur

General information
- Location: Basantapur, Odisha; India
- Coordinates: 21°32′57″N 85°40′40″E
- System: Indian Railways station
- Owner: Ministry of Railways, Indian Railways
- Line: Howrah–Chennai main line
- Platforms: 2
- Tracks: 2

Construction
- Structure type: Standard (on ground)
- Parking: No

Other information
- Status: Functioning
- Station code: BSTP
- Zone(s): East Coast Railway
- Division(s): Khurda Road
Location
- Location within India Location within Odisha

Basantapur railway station is a railway station on the East Coast Railway network in the state of Odisha, India. It serves Basantapur village. Its code is BSTP. It has two platforms. Passenger, MEMU, Express trains halt at Basantapur railway station.

== Major trains ==
- Puri–Barbil Express
- Khurda Road-Kendujhargarh MEMU
- Paradeep-Kendujhargarh MEMU

== See also ==
- Kendujhar district
