= Deojhar railway station =

Railway station in India

Deojhar

General information
- Location: Deojhar, Odisha; India
- Coordinates: 22°04′55″N 85°28′38″E
- System: Indian Railway Station
- Owner: Ministry of Railways, Indian Railways
- Line: Tatanagar–Bilaspur section
- Platforms: 2
- Tracks: 2

Construction
- Structure type: Standard (On Ground)
- Parking: No

Other information
- Status: Functioning
- Station code: DJHR
- Zone(s): South Eastern Railway
- Division(s): Chakradharpur
Location
- Location within India Location within Odisha

Deojhar railway station is a railway station on the South Eastern Railway network in the state of Odisha, India. It serves Deojhar village. Its code is DJHR. It has two platforms. Express trains halt at Deojhar railway station.

== Major Trains ==
- Puri - Barbil Express

== See also ==
- Kendujhar district
