= Goaldih railway station =

Railway station on the East Coast Railway network in India

Goaldih

General information
- Location: Goaldih, Odisha; India
- Coordinates: 21°43′47″N 85°32′44″E
- System: Indian Railways station
- Owner: Ministry of Railways, Indian Railways
- Line: Howrah–Chennai main line
- Platforms: 2
- Tracks: 2

Construction
- Structure type: Standard (on ground)
- Parking: No

Other information
- Status: Functioning
- Station code: GADH
- Zone(s): East Coast Railway
- Division(s): Khurda Road
Location
- Location within India Location within Odisha

Goaldih railway station is a railway station on the East Coast Railway network in the state of Odisha, India. It serves Goaldih village. Its code is GADH. It has two platforms. Express trains halt at Goaldih railway station.

== Major trains ==
- Puri–Barbil Express

== See also ==
- Kendujhar district
