= Karaikella =

- Village
- Location within Jharkhand Location within India
- Coordinates: 22.716667°N 85.55°E
- Country: India
- State: Jharkhand
- District: West Singhbhum

Karaikella is a village situated at Chaibasa–Ranchi Main Road near Chakradharpur in the Indian state of Jharkhand.

== History ==
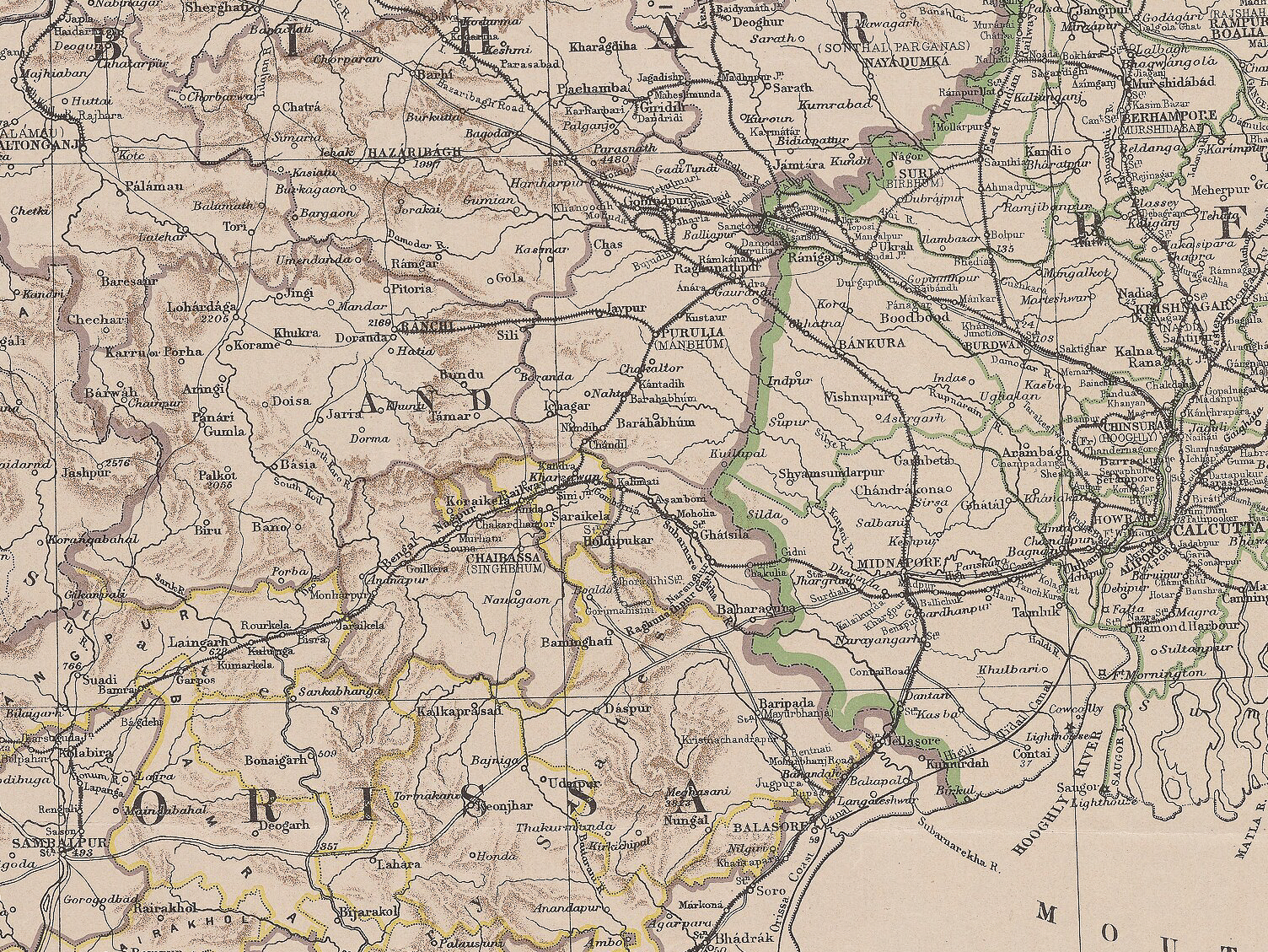
The Karaikela enclave of the Saraikela State, within Singhbhum, 1912

Karaikela, once was a pargana within the Porahat estate, spanned an expansive 50 square miles, encompassing as many as 64 villages. The period of 1857-1859 bore witness to a series of conflicts between the Porahat state and the British administration, culminating in the eventual surrender of Raja Arjun Singh, the incumbent ruler of Porahat. Subsequent to his capitulation, Raja Arjun Singh was exiled to Banaras, marking a significant shift in the region's leadership. In the wake of these transformative events, the British authorities recognized the steadfastness of the Raja of the Saraikela state and conferred upon him the stewardship of Karaikela in 1860.
