= Chennai Central–Vijayawada Jan Shatabdi Express =

Jan Shatabdi Express train in India

MGR Chennai Central – Vijayawada Jn Jan Shatabdi Express
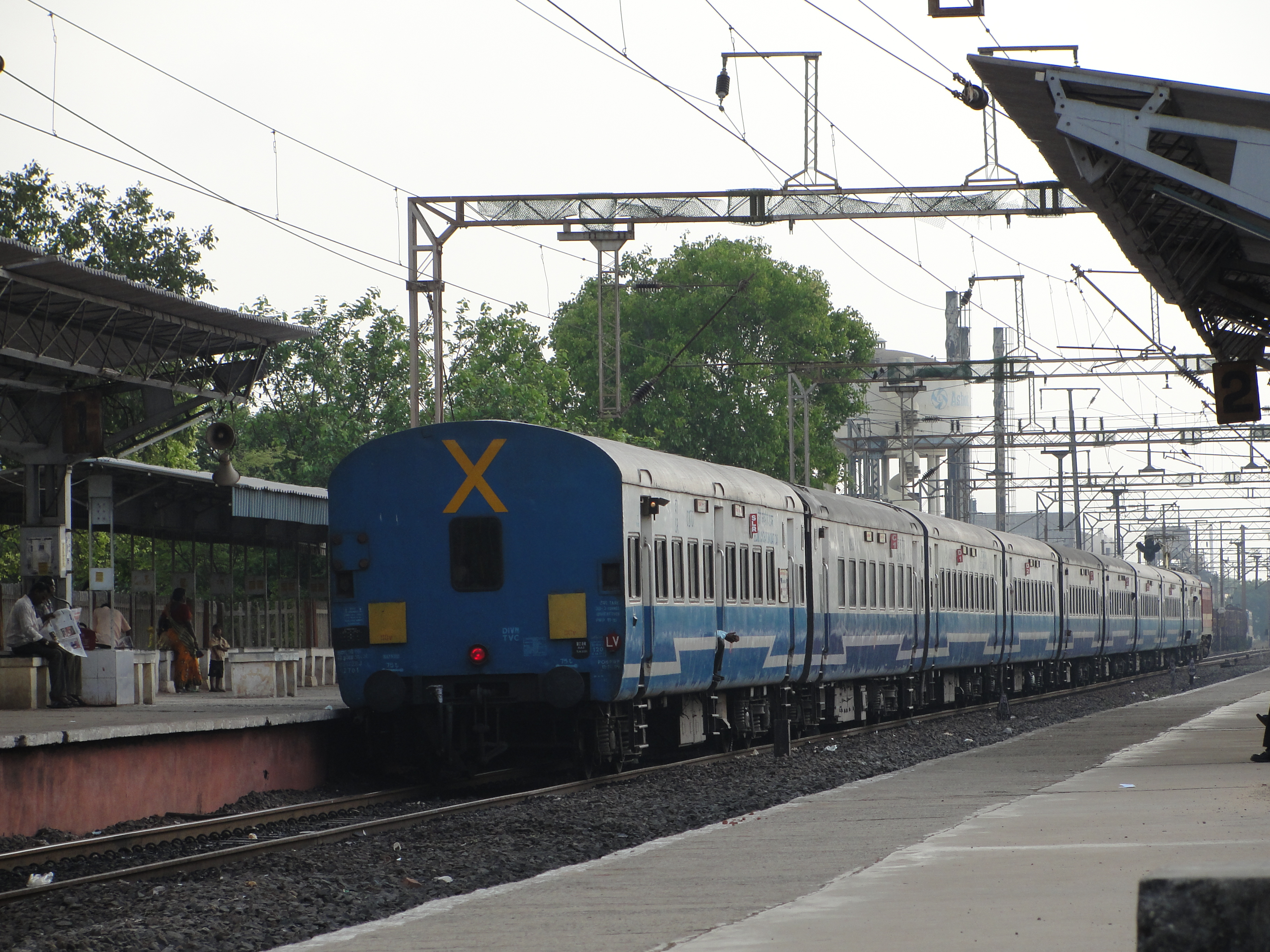
- Vijayawada Jan Shatabdi Express at Kathivakkam

Overview
- Service type: Superfast Express, Jan Shatabdi Express
- First service: 27 August 2002; 23 years ago
- Current operator: Southern Railways (SR)

Route
- Termini: MGR Chennai Central (MAS); Vijayawada Junction (BZA)
- Stops: 9
- Distance travelled: 455 km (283 mi)
- Average journey time: 7 hours 10 minutes as 12077, 7 hours 10 minutes as 12078
- Service frequency: Six days a week (Note: Except Tuesdays)
- Train number: 12077 / 12078

On-board services
- Classes: AC Chair Car, Second Class seating
- Seating arrangements: Yes
- Sleeping arrangements: No
- Catering facilities: No pantry car attached but on-board catering available
- Baggage facilities: Overhead racks

Technical
- Rolling stock: LHB coach
- Track gauge: 1,676 mm (5 ft 6 in)
- Operating speed: 63 km/h (39 mph) – average
Route map
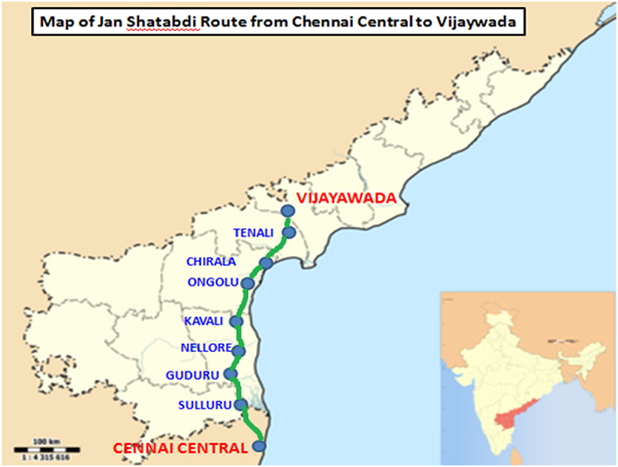
↓ 12078 • 12077 ↑

The 12077 / 12078 MGR Chennai Central – Vijayawada Jan Shatabdi Express is a day-train, so called because as it returns to the station of origin on the same day. It connects the two commercial centers of South India – Chennai and Vijayawada. It is one of the fastest and most comfortable trains between Chennai and Vijayawada.

== Overview ==
Vijayawada Jan Shatabdi runs between Chennai Central and Vijayawada Jn.

The train is numbered as 12077 from Chennai Central. It departs at 07:25 and reaches Vijayawada Junction at 14:55 taking 7 hours 30 minutes to cover 455 km. On the return journey the train is numbered as 12078 and departs from Vijayawada Jn at 15:30 and arrives at Chennai Central at 22:55.

Frequency. Except Tuesday All Days The Chennai–Vijayawada Jan Shatabdi is an 16-coach train and has 12 Jan Shatabdi class chair cars, 2 AC chair car and 2 luggage-cum-brake vans as part of its seating configuration.

== History ==
Initially it was operated from Chennai Egmore, after the gauge conversion gained steam, this train was shifted to Chennai Central to facilitate better punctuality of incoming trains from southern Tamil Nadu.

It was allocated with the modern LHB coach from February 2020.

== Locomotives ==
It is hauled by a Royapuram or Erode-based WAP-7 locomotive on its entire journey.

== See also ==
- Mayiladuthurai–Coimbatore Jan Shatabdi Express
- Bangalore City–Hubli Jan Shatabdi Express
