= Jan Shatabdi Express =

Series of Express day train in India

Jan Shatabdi Express transl. People's Centenary Express
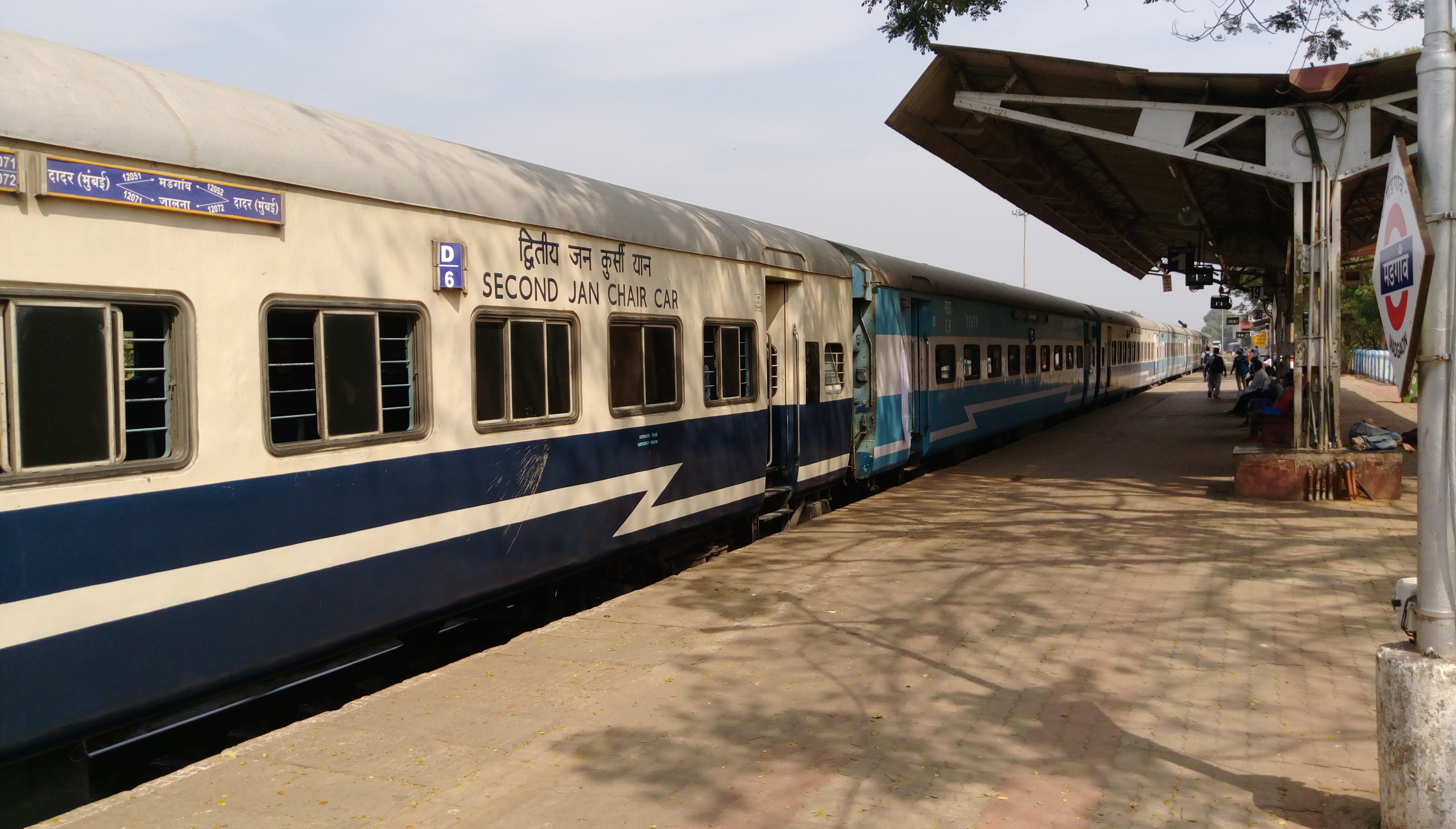
- Jan Shatabdi Express at Madgaon

Overview
- Status: Operating
- First service: 16-April-2002; 24 years ago
- Current operator: Indian Railways
- Website: https://indianrail.gov.in

Route
- Line used: 27

On-board services
- Classes: Executive Class, AC Chair Car, 2nd Class seating, Vistadome
- Seating arrangements: Yes
- Sleeping arrangements: No
- Catering facilities: Yes
- Entertainment facilities: No
- Baggage facilities: Overhead racks

Technical
- Rolling stock: LHB coach & Vistadome coaches
- Track gauge: 5 ft 6 in (1,676 mm) broad gauge
- Operating speed: Maximum permissible speed of 130 km/h (80 mph)
- Track owner: Indian Railways

The Jan Shatabdi Express (transl. People's Centenary Express) is a more affordable and economical version of the Shatabdi Express. The word 'Jan' refers to common people. Being an economical version of the Shatabdi Express, it provides the passenger with Air Conditioned Chair Car, Second Class Seating and UnReserved classes. Though its priority is less than that of the trains like Rajdhani Express, Shatabdi Express and Duronto Express, it enjoys a greater priority than the Mail, Express and the Superfast Express trains of Indian Railways. The maximum permissible speed of this train is 130 km/h.

== Active Services ==
As of for 2026 there are 27 active routes of Jan Shatabdi Express trains

Train No.	Terminus	Terminus	Zone	Length	Route
12021/12022	Howrah	Barbil	SE	399 km (248 mi)	KBHFa blue BHF blue STR_blue+GRZq STR blue+GRZq KBHFe blue
12023/12024	Howrah	Patna	EC	532 km (331 mi)	KBHFa blue BHF blue STR blue+GRZq STR_blue+GRZq KBHFe blue
12035/12036	Old Delhi	Tanakpur	NE	393 km (244 mi)	KBHFa blue BHF blue STR blue+GRZq LSTR blue KBHFe blue
12037/12038	Old Delhi	Kotdwar	NR	239 km (149 mi)	KHSTa blue BHF blue HST blue KBHFe blue
12047/12048	Guwahati	North Lakhimpur	NF	344 km (214 mi)	KBHFa blue HST blue BHF blue KBHFe blue
12051/12052	Mumbai CSMT	Madgaon	KR	581 km (361 mi)	KBHFa blue BHF blue STR_blue+GRZq KBHFe blue
12053/12054	Haridwar	Amritsar	NR	407 km (253 mi)	KBHFa blue BHF blue STR blue+GRZq KBHFe blue
12055/12056	New Delhi	Dehradun	NR	305 km (190 mi)	KBHFa blue BHF blue STR blue+GRZq BHF(R)f blue KBHFe blue
12057/12058	New Delhi	Daulatpur Chowk	NR	428 km (266 mi)	KBHFa blue HST blue BHF blue; GRZq BHF blue STR blue+GRZq KBHFe blue
12059/12060	Kota	Hazrat Nizamuddin	WC	458 km (285 mi)	KBHFa blue BHF blue STR blue+GRZq STR_blue+GRZq KBHFe blue
12061/12062	Rani Kamalapati	Jabalpur	WC	331 km (206 mi)	KBHFa blue BHF blue KBHFaq blue ABZr+r blue KBHFe blue
12065/12066	Ajmer	Delhi Sarai Rohilla	NW	374 km (232 mi)	KBHFa blue BHF blue STR_blue+GRZq STR blue+GRZq KBHFe blue
12067/12068	Guwahati	Jorhat Town	NF	375 km (233 mi)	KBHFa blue BHF blue STR blue+GRZq STR_blue+GRZq KBHFe blue
12069/12070	Raigarh	Gondia	SECR	415 km (258 mi)	KBHFa blue HST blue BHF blue KBHFe blue
12071/12072	Mumbai CSMT	Hingoli Deccan	CR	658 km (409 mi)	KBHFa blue BHF blue KBHFe blue
12073/12074	Howrah	Bhubaneswar	ECoR	437 km (272 mi)	KBHFa blue BHF blue STR_blue+GRZq KBHFe blue
12075/12076	Thiruvananthapuram	Kozhikode	SR	399 km (248 mi)	KBHFa blue HST blue BHF blue KBHFe blue
12077/12078	Chennai Central	Vijayawada	SR	455 km (283 mi)	KBHFa blue BHF blue STR blue+GRZq KBHFe blue
12079/12080	Bengaluru City	Hubballi	SWR	470 km (290 mi)	KBHFa blue BHF blue HST blue KBHFe blue
12081/12082	Kannur	Thiruvananthapuram	SR	500 km (310 mi)	KBHFa blue BHF blue KBHFe blue
12083/12084	Mayiladuthurai	Coimbatore	SR	362 km (225 mi)	KBHFa blue BHF blue cd; KBHFaq blue ABZr+r blue KBHFe blue
12089/12090	Bangalore City	Shivamogga Town	SWR	268 km (167 mi)	KBHFa blue HST blue BHF blue KBHFe blue
12091/12092	Dehradun	Kathgodam	NE	335 km (208 mi)	KBHFa blue BHF blue STR blue+GRZq HST blue KBHFe blue
12097/12098	Agartala	Khongsang	NF	348 km (216 mi)	KHSTa blue HST blue BHF blue KBHFaq blue ABZr+r blue KBHFe blue
12365/12366	Patna	Ranchi	EC	410 km (250 mi)	KBHFa blue HST blue KBHFaq blue ABZr+r blue BHF blue STR blue+GRZq KBHFe blue
15125/15126	Banaras	Patna	NE	233 km (145 mi)	KBHFa blue BHF blue HST blue STR blue+GRZq KBHFe blue
20947/20950	Ahmedabad	Ekta Nagar	WR	184 km (114 mi)	KBHFa blue pHST blue BHF blue pBHF blue KBHFe blue

== Gallery ==
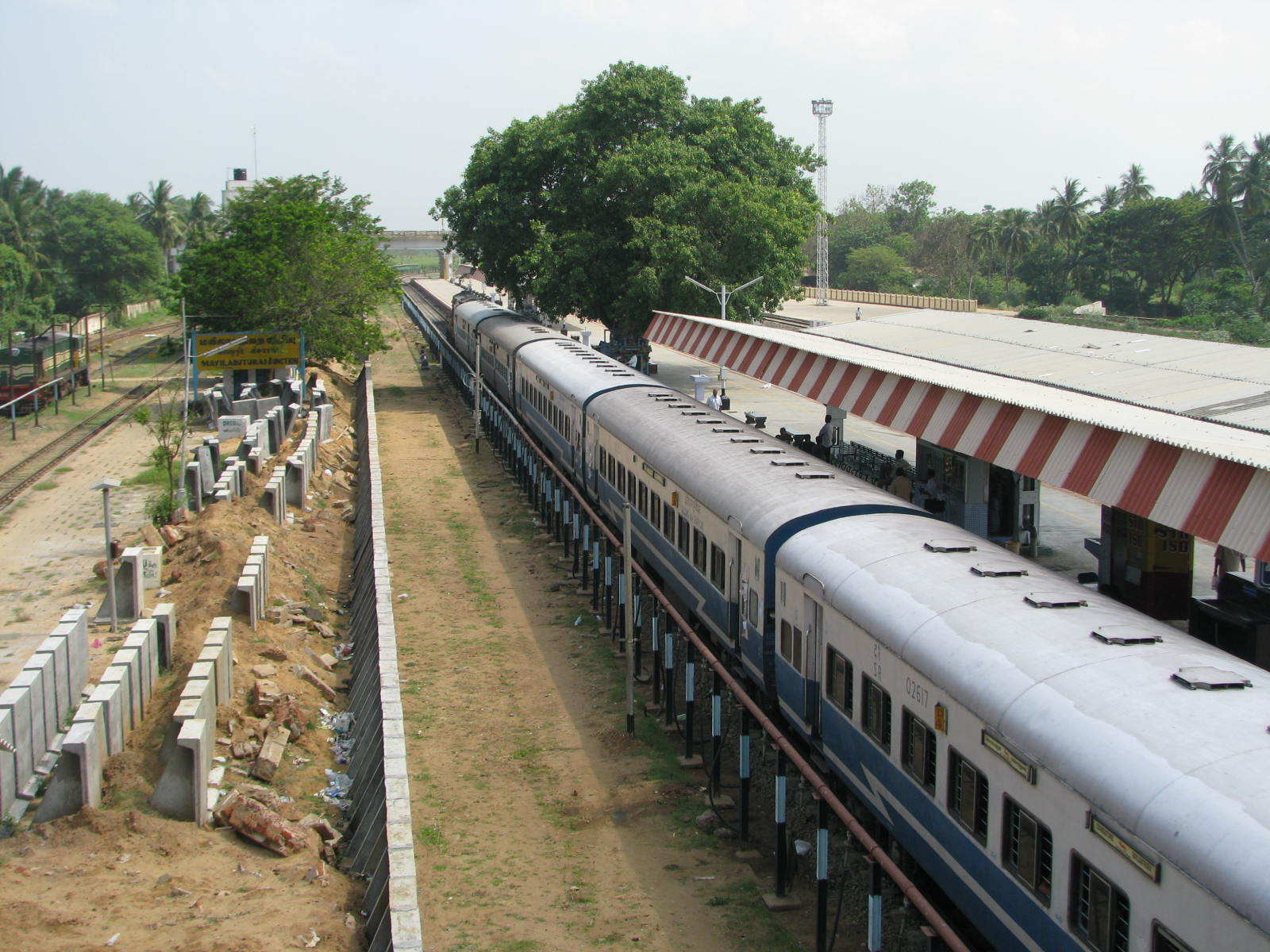
Jan Shatabdi Express at Mayiladuthurai Junction

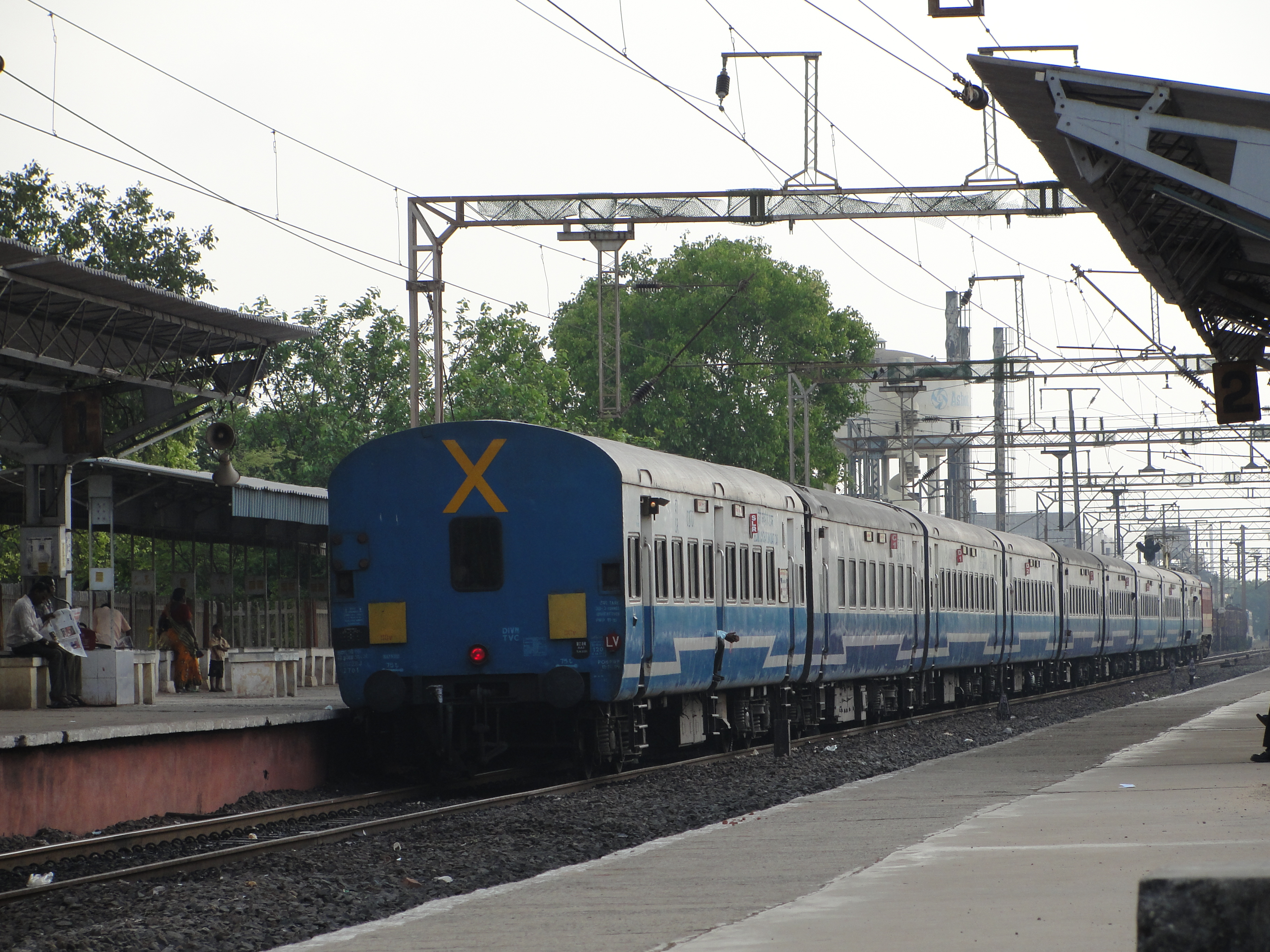
Vijayawada Jan Shatabdi Express

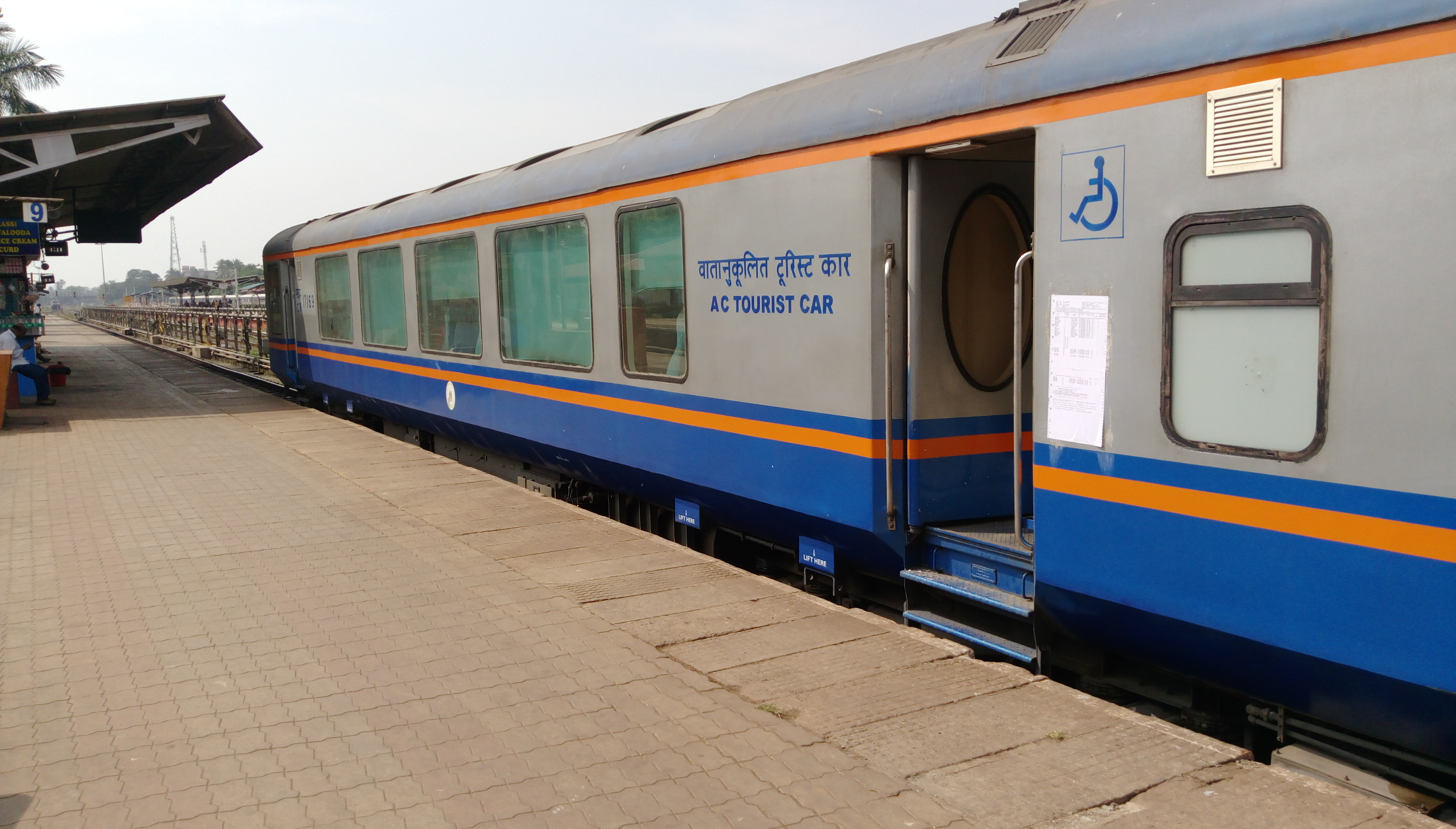
Vistadome of the Dadar–Madgaon Jan Shatabdi Express

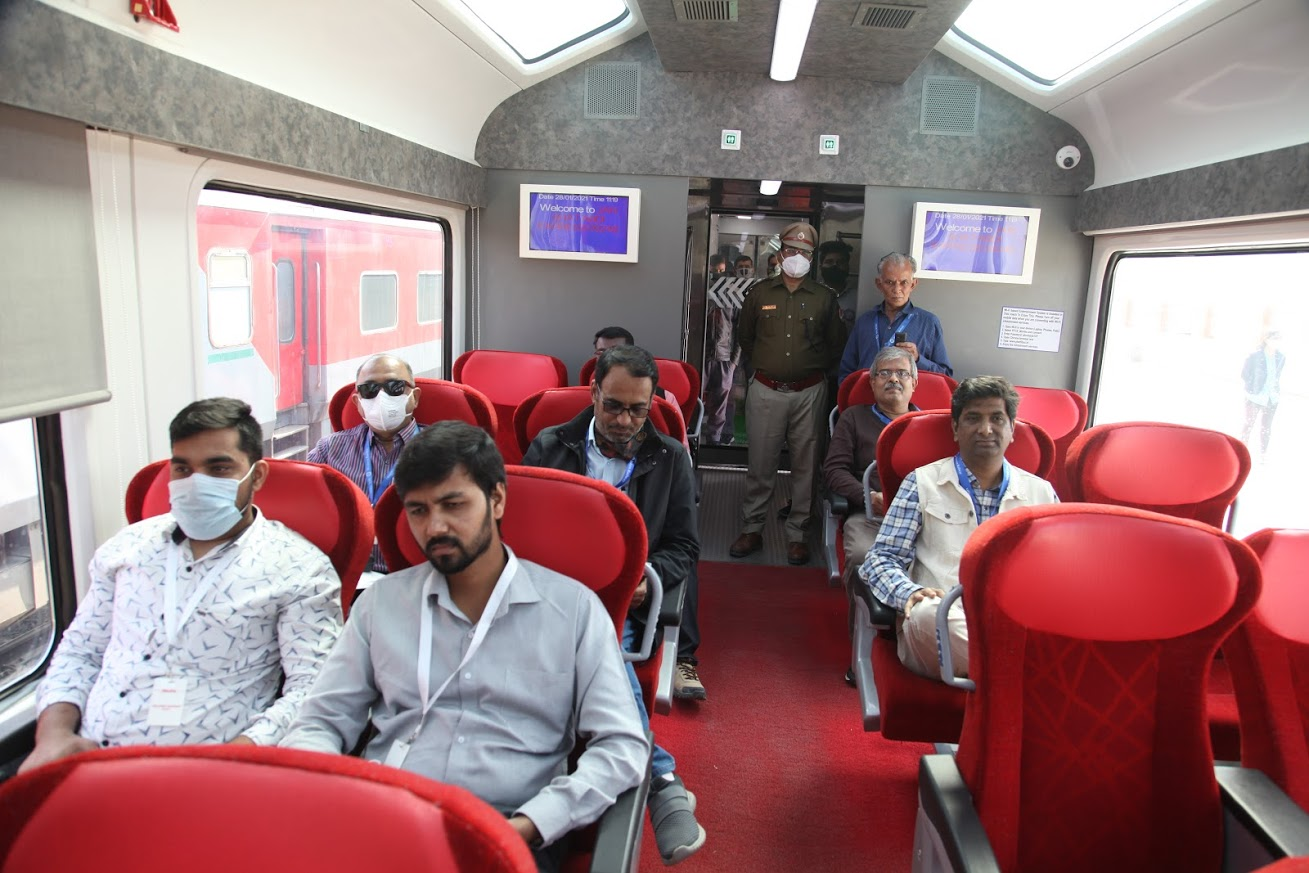
Inside view of the Vistadome coach of the Ahmedabad–Kevadiya Jan Shatabdi Express

== See also ==
- AC Superfast Express
- Mumbai–Ahmedabad high-speed rail corridor
- Vande Bharat Express
- Gatimaan Express
- Humsafar Express
- Tejas Express
- Duronto Express
- Rajdhani Express
- Shatabdi Express
- Mahamana Express
- Antyodaya Express
- Ramayana Express
- Uday Express
- Double Decker Express
- Garib Rath Express
- Yuva Express
- Kavi Guru Express
- Rajya Rani Express
- Express
