= Tinsukia railway division =

Railway division of India

Tinsukia railway division is one of the five railway divisions under the jurisdiction of Northeast Frontier Railway zone of the Indian Railways. This railway division was formed on 15 January 1958 and its headquarter is located at Tinsukia in the state of Assam.

Katihar railway division, Lumding railway division, Alipurduar railway division and Rangiya railway division are the other four railway divisions under the NFR Zone headquartered at Maligaon, Guwahati.

== List of railway stations and towns ==
The list includes the stations under the Tinsukia railway division and their station category.

| Category of station | No. of stations | Names of stations |
|---|---|---|
| A-1 Category | 0 | - |
| A Category | 5 | Dibrugarh, Dibrugarh Town, New Tinsukia, Jorhat Town |
| B Category | - | - |
| C Category (Suburban station) | - | - |
| D Category | - | - |
| E Category | - | - |
| F Category; Halt Station | - | - |
| Total | - | - |

Stations closed for Passengers -
