= Jhinkpani =

Jhinkpani Jorapokhar
- Census town
- Location in Jharkhand, India Jhinkpani (India)
- Coordinates: 22.42°N 85.75°E
- Country: India
- State: Jharkhand
- District: Pashchimi Singhbhum
- Block: Jhinkpani block

Population (2011)
  - Total: 13,068

Languages
  - Official: Hindi, Ho, Santali
- Time zone: UTC+5:30 (IST)
- Postal code: 833215
- Vehicle registration: JH

Jhinkpani or Jorapokhar is a census town in Pashchimi Singhbhum district in the Indian state of Jharkhand. It is the administrative headquarters of Jhinkpani block.

== Demographics ==
As of 2011 India census, Jhinkpani had a population of 13,068. Males constitute 51% of the population and females 49%. Jhinkpani has an average literacy rate of 68.00%, higher than the national average of 59.5%: male literacy is 78.07%, and female literacy is 58.21%. In Jhinkpani, 15% of the population is under 6 years of age.

== Industry ==
The ACC Jhinkpani Factory has shut down, increasing unemployment in Jhinkpani.

== Transport ==
There is a railway station in Jhinkpani. It is 16 kilometres (10mi) from Chaibasa railway station and 59 kilometres (36mi) from Tatanagar Junction railway station.
