= Bhubaneswar–Howrah Jan Shatabdi Express =

Jan Shatabdi Express train in India

Bhubaneswar – Howrah Junction Jan Shatabdi Express

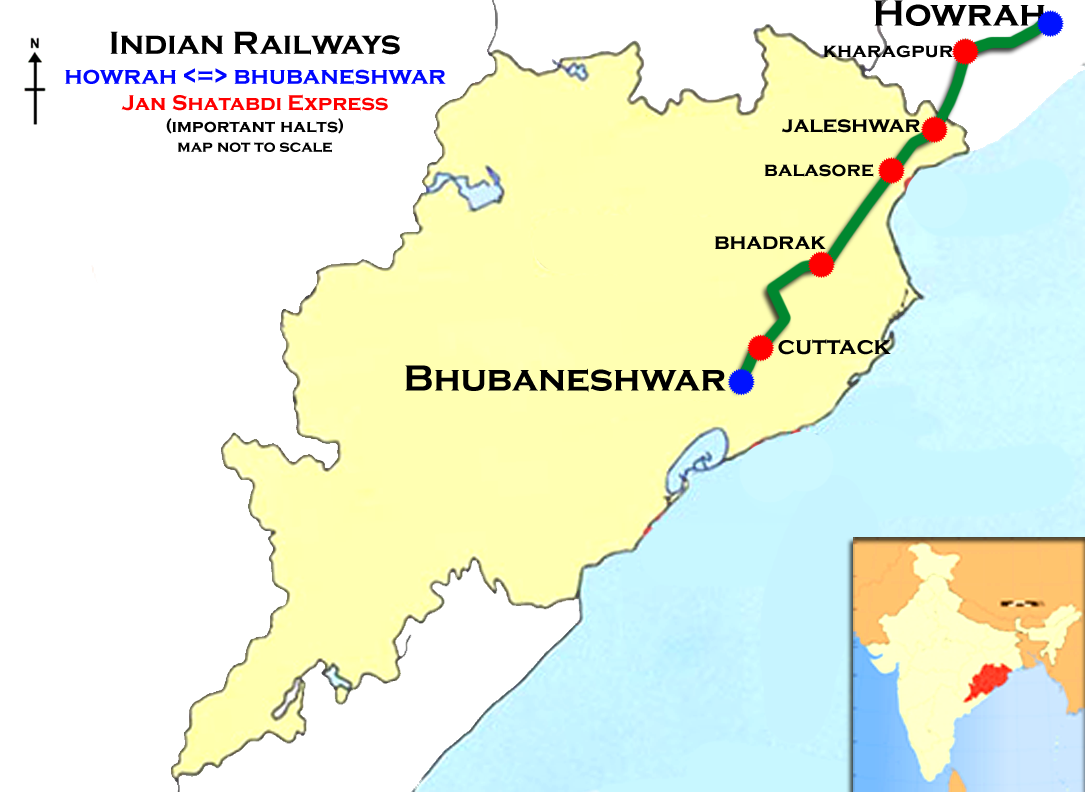

Overview
- Service type: Superfast Express, Jan Shatabdi Express
- First service: 13 October 2002; 24 years ago
- Current operator: East Coast Railways (ECoR)

Route
- Termini: Bhubaneswar (BBS); Howrah Junction (HWH)
- Stops: 7
- Distance travelled: 439 km (273 mi)
- Average journey time: 7 hours (Approx.)
- Service frequency: Daily service
- Train number: 12073 / 12074

On-board services
- Classes: AC Chair Car, Second Class seating
- Seating arrangements: Yes
- Sleeping arrangements: No
- Auto-rack arrangements: No
- Catering facilities: On-board catering E-catering
- Baggage facilities: Overhead racks

Technical
- Rolling stock: LHB coach
- Track gauge: 1,676 mm (5 ft 6 in)
- Electrification: Yes
- Operating speed: 65 km/h (40 mph) average including halts
Route map
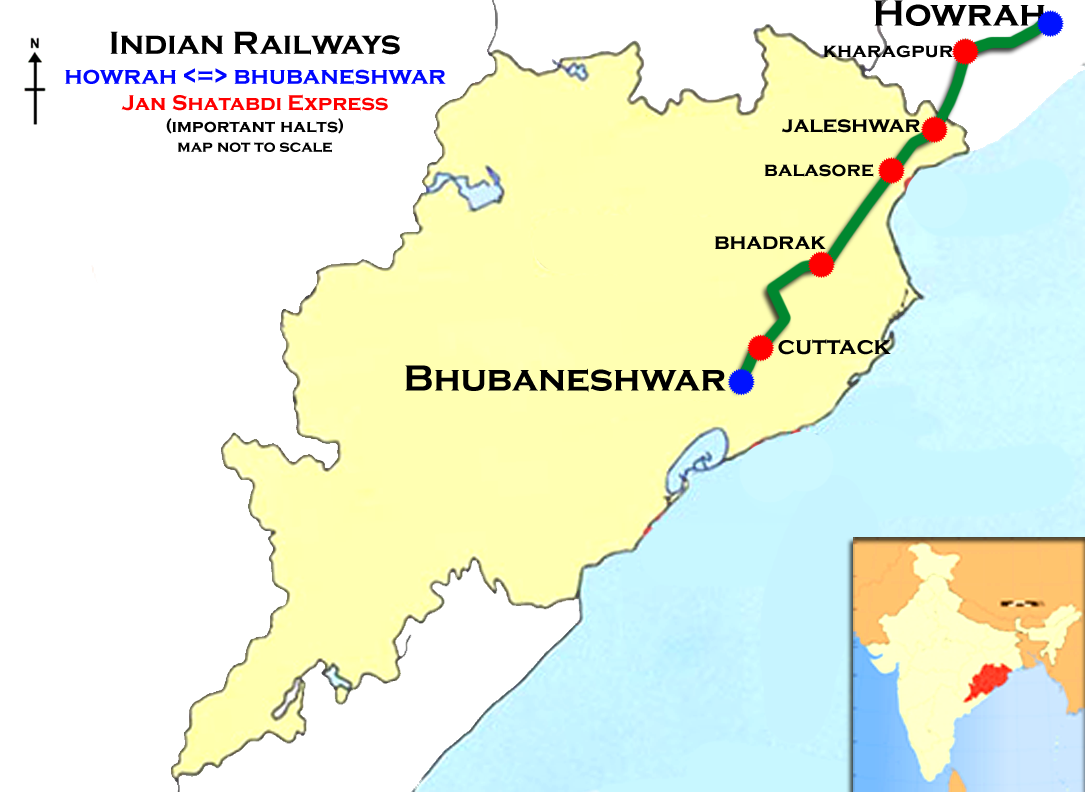
↓ 12073 • 12074 ↑

The 12073 / 12074 Bhubaneswar–Howrah Jan Shatabdi Express is a Superfast Express train of the Jan Shatabdi Express series belonging to Indian Railways – East Coast Railway zone that runs between Bhubaneswar and Howrah Junction in India.

It operates as train number 12074 from Bhubaneswar to Howrah Junction and as train number 12073 in the reverse direction, serving the states of Odisha and West Bengal.

It is part of the Jan Shatabdi Express series launched by the former railway minister of India, Mr. Nitish Kumar in the 2002 / 03 Rail Budget .

== Coaches ==
The 12074 / 73 Bhubaneswar–Howrah Jan Shatabdi Express has 2 AC Chair Car, 13 Second Class seating & 2 EOG. It does not carry a pantry car.

As is customary with most train services in India, coach composition may be amended at the discretion of Indian Railways depending on demand.

== Service ==
The 12074 Bhubaneswar–Howrah Jan Shatabdi Express covers the distance of 439 km (273 mi) in 6 hours 40 mins (65.85 km/h) and in 6 hours 55 mins as 12073 Howrah–Bhubaneswar Jan Shatabdi Express (66.47 km/h) this is the average speed and the maximum permissible speed of this train is 130 km/h between Bhubaneswar and Andul.

As the average speed of the train is above 55 km/h (34 mph), as per Indian Railways rules, its fare includes a Superfast surcharge.

== Routeing ==
The 12074 / 73 Bhubaneswar–Howrah Jan Shatabdi Express runs from Bhubaneswar via Cuttack, Balasore, Kharagpur Junction to Howrah Junction. When the train was extended up to Bhubaneswar the train did not use to go via Cuttack it had other route later on the train connected via Cuttack.

== Traction ==
It is hauled by a Bondamunda/ Visakhapatnam/Santragachi-based WAP-7 locomotive on its entire journey.
