= Guwahati–Jorhat Town Jan Shatabdi Express =

Jan Shatabdi Express train in India

Guwahati – Jorhat Town Jan Shatabdi Express

- Guwahati–Jorhat Town Jan Shatabdi Express at Jorhat Town

Overview
- Service type: Superfast Express, Jan Shatabdi Express
- First service: 11 October 2002; 24 years ago
- Current operator: Northeast Frontier Railways (NFR)

Route
- Termini: Guwahati (GHY); Jorhat Town (JTTN)
- Stops: 9
- Distance travelled: 375 km (233 mi)
- Average journey time: 6 hours 50 minutes as 12067, 7 hours 00 minutes as 12068.
- Service frequency: Six days a week (Note: Except Sundays)
- Train number: 12067 / 12068

On-board services
- Classes: AC Chair Car, Second Class seating
- Seating arrangements: Yes
- Sleeping arrangements: No
- Auto-rack arrangements: No
- Catering facilities: Yes
- Observation facilities: Previously ran up to Dimapur
- Baggage facilities: Overhead racks

Technical
- Rolling stock: LHB coach
- Track gauge: 1,676 mm (5 ft 6 in)
- Electrification: No
- Operating speed: 130 km/h (81 mph) maximum, 58.60 km/h (36 mph) excluding halts
Route map
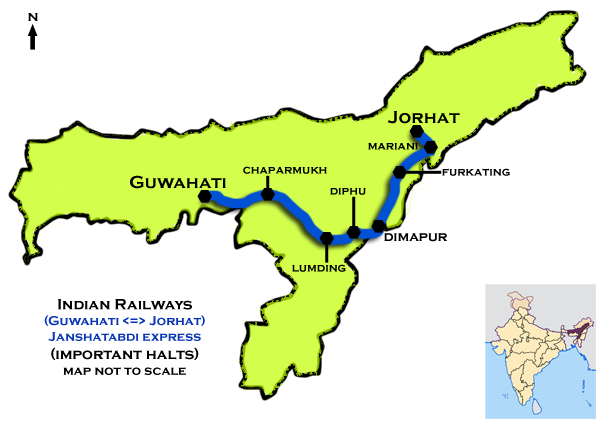
↓ 12067 • 12068 ↑

The 12067 / 12068 Guwahati - Jorhat Town Jan Shatabdi Express is a Superfast Express train of the Jan Shatabdi Express series belonging to Indian Railways - Northeast Frontier Railway zone that runs between Guwahati and Jorhat Town in India.

It operates as train number 12067 from Guwahati to Jorhat Town and as train number 12068 in the reverse direction, serving the states of Assam and Nagaland.

It is part of the Jan Shatabdi Express series launched by the former railway minister of India, Mr. Nitish Kumar in the 2002 / 03 Rail Budget .

== Coaches ==
The 12067 /68 Guwahati–Jorhat Town Jan Shatabdi Express has 3 AC Chair Car (LWSCZAC), 1 AC Vistadome Coach (LWCTZAC), 10 Second Class seating (LWSCZ) and 2 Generator cum luggage cum Guard Coaches (LWLRRM). It does not carry a Pantry car coach .

As is customary with most train services in India, Coach Composition may be amended at the discretion of Indian Railways depending on demand.

== Service ==
The 12067 Guwahati–Jorhat Town Jan Shatabdi Express covers the distance of 376 km (234 mi) in 6 hours 50 mins (59.37 km/h) excluding halts and in 7 hours 00 mins as 12068 Jorhat Town–Guwahati Jan Shatabdi Express (57.85 km/h) excluding halts.

As the average speed of the train is above 55 km/h (34 mph), as per Indian Railways rules, its fare includes a Superfast Express surcharge.

== Route and halts ==
The 12067/68 Guwahati–Jorhat Town Jan Shatabdi Express runs from Guwahati via Chaparmukh Junction, Hojai, Lanka, Lumding Junction, Diphu, Dimapur, Furkating Junction, Mariani Junction to Jorhat Town.

== Traction ==
As the entire route is yet to be fully electrified, a Guwahati based WDM-3D or WDP-4D or a Siliguri based WDP-4, WDP-4B or WDP-4D locomotive is the traditional power for this train and hauls the train for its entire journey. The electrification of the route is completed and this train now operates with a WAP-7(New Guwahati Loco shed) electric Locomotive from May 2026. It's a major achievement of the train since there are many memories remain in diesel locomotives. At first it was hauled by a ALOCO then WDP and then finally WAP Electric loco.

== Operation ==
12067 Guwahati–Jorhat Town Jan Shatabdi Express runs from Guwahati on all days except Sunday arriving Jorhat Town the same day .

12068 Jorhat Town–Guwahati Jan Shatabdi Express runs from Jorhat Town on all days except Sunday arriving Guwahati the same day .

== Incidents ==
- On 10 November 2008, the train narrowly averted de-railment.
