= Jorhat Town railway station =

Railway station in Assam

Jorhat Town
- Jorhat Town railway station

General information
- Location: Bashbari, Jorhat, Assam; India
- Coordinates: 26.7505°N 94.2171°E
- Elevation: 94 metres (308 ft)
- System: Indian Railways station
- Owner: Indian Railways
- Line: Furkating–Mariani branch line via Jorhat
- Platforms: 2
- Tracks: 3
- Connections: Auto stand

Construction
- Structure type: At grade
- Parking: Yes
- Cycle facilities: Yes
- Accessible: No

Other information
- Status: Functioning
- Station code: JTTN
- Zone(s): Northeast Frontier
- Division(s): Tinsukia
Location
- Location within Assam Location within India

Jorhat Town railway station is a railway station in Jorhat district, Assam. Its code is JTTN and it serves Jorhat City. Jorhat Town Railway station consists of two platforms. Mariani Junction (MXN), the biggest railway junction of the district which is 16 km away from the city.

The station lies on the Furkating–Mariani branch line via Jorhat and it is part of Tinsukia railway division of Northeast Frontier Railway zone.

== Trains ==
- Jorhat Town–Tinsukia Passenger
- Guwahati–Mariani Intercity Express
- Guwahati–Dibrugarh Intercity Express
- Dimapur–Mariani Passenger
- Guwahati–Jorhat Town Jan Shatabdi Express
- Guwahati–Mariani BG Express
- Guwahati–Dibrugarh Town Nagaland Express
