= Sailesh Kumar Bandopadhyay =

Indian Gandhian activist and historian (1926–2016)

- Born: 10 March 1926; Chakradharpur, Jharkhand, India
- Died: 24 October 2016 (aged 90); Kolkata, West Bengal, India
- Occupations: Social activist, Gandhian
- Awards: Padma Bhushan; Ananda Puroskar; Ashalata Puroskar; Annada Shankar Literary Award

Sailesh Kumar Bandopadhyay (10 March 1926 – 24 October 2016) was an Indian social activist and Gandhian, who was a close associate of Mahatma Gandhi. The Government of India honoured him in 2010, with the Padma Bhushan, the third-highest civilian award, for his services to the fields of medicine and public health.

== Biography ==
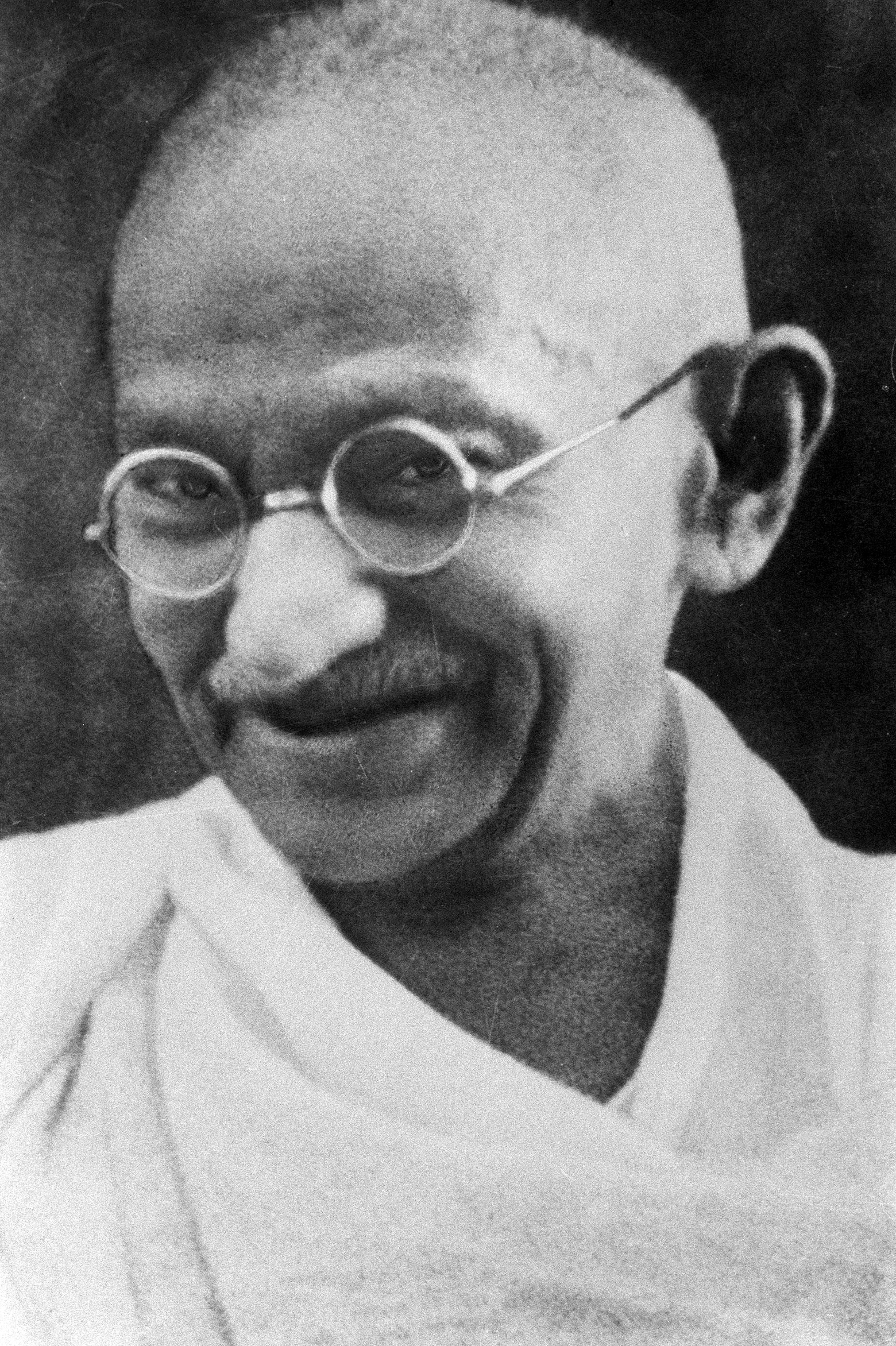
Portrait Gandhi

Sailesh Kumar Bandyopadhyay was born on 10 March 1926, at Chakradharpur, in the erstwhile Bengal, presently in the Indian state of Jharkhand. His father was an Indian Railways employee with moderate financial resources. The young Sailesh soon came under the influence of Mahatma Gandhi and, after passing matriculation in 1942, he joined Quit India Movement and was arrested twice by the British India police.

In 1944, Bandyopadhyay joined the trade union movement at Tatanagar, which was being led by known trade union activists such as Abdul Bari, Michael John and Moni Ghosh. Two years later, in 1946, he joined Indian National Congress. Soon, he rose up in ranks and in 1951, he became the Office Secretary of the District Congress Committee, with the responsibility of the Gandhian Village Reconstruction Centre, near Jamshedpur.

In 1951, Bandyopadhyay joined the All India Spinner's Association, known locally as Charkha Sangh, Sevagram and worked there till 1961. During this time, he was also involved in the Bhoodan movement. In 1961, he selected as the deputy director of the Khadi and Village Industries Commission where he worked till 1984 when he retired from service as its deputy chief executive officer. Prior to his retirement, he also worked as the administration director of the commission in Bihar, Orissa and West Bengal. He was also in charge of the Gandhi Centenary Celebration Committee as its chief executive in 1969.

The next two decades saw Bandyopadhyay working in different organizations such as Gandhi Smarak Nidhi, as its secretary, the Khadi Mission as its joint convenor, member of the committee of the Khadi and Village Industries Commission, headed by the prime minister, chairman of the Central Certification Committee on Khadi.

In 2006, he was again selected as the member of the Khadi committee. Bandopadhyay continued to work in the rural areas with many organisations, involved in the promotion of the poor.

Bandyopadhyay died on 24 October 2016, at the age of 90.

== Positions ==
Video footage of the days during Quit India Movement.

- Secretary District Congress Committee – 1946 to 1951
- Deputy Director – Khadi and Village Industries Commission – 1961
- Chief Executive — Gandhi Centenary Committee – 1969
- Chief Executive Officer – Khadi and Village Industries Commission – 1984
- Member — Khadi and Village Industries Commission – 1984
- Secretary — Gandhi Smarak Nidhi
- Joint Convenor — Khadi Mission
- Chairman, Central Certification Committee on Khadi

== Awards and recognitions ==
- Padma Bhushan – 2010
- Ananda Puroskar
- Ashalata Puroskar – Viswa Bharati University
- Annada Shankar Literary Award – Bangla Academy

== Writings ==
Sailesh Kumar Bandhopadyaya was a prolific writer and one of his books, Gandhi Parikrama, is prescribed by the University of Calcutta as text for the three year honors degree on Philosophy.

- Sailesh Kumar Bandopadhyaya, ed. (November 1960). Peace, Non violence and Conflict Resolution. Ahmedabad: Navajivan Mudranalaya. ISBN 81-7229-223-6.
- Bandyopadhyay, Sailesh Kumar (2012). "Basu, Kshudiram". In Islam, Sirajul; Jamal, Ahmed A. (eds.). Banglapedia: National Encyclopedia of Bangladesh (Second ed.). Asiatic Society of Bangladesh.
- Bandyopadhyay, Sailesh Kumar (2012). "Datta, Kalpana". In Islam, Sirajul; Jamal, Ahmed A. (eds.). Banglapedia: National Encyclopedia of Bangladesh (Second ed.). Asiatic Society of Bangladesh.
