= Shivamogga Town–KSR Bengaluru Jan Shatabdi Express =

Jan Shatabdi Express train in India

Shivamogga Town - KSR Bengaluru Jan Shatabdi Express

Overview
- Service type: Superfast, Jan Shatabdi Express
- First service: 3 February 2019; 7 years ago
- Current operator: South Western Railway

Route
- Termini: Shivamogga Town (SMET); KSR Bengaluru (SBC)
- Stops: 6
- Distance travelled: 274 km (170 mi)
- Average journey time: 4 hours 15 minutes
- Service frequency: Daily (Note: Everyday.)
- Train number: 12090 / 12089

On-board services
- Classes: AC Chair Car, Second Class Seating
- Seating arrangements: Yes
- Sleeping arrangements: No
- Auto-rack arrangements: Overhead racks
- Catering facilities: On-board catering, E-catering
- Observation facilities: Large windows
- Baggage facilities: Available
- Other facilities: Below the seats

Technical
- Rolling stock: LHB coach
- Track gauge: 1,676 mm (5 ft 6 in)
- Electrification: Yes
- Operating speed: 110 km/h (70 mph) maximum, 64 km/h (40 mph) average including halts.

The 12090 / 12089 Shivamogga Town-KSR Bengaluru Jan Shatabdi Express is a superfast express train of the Jan Shatabdi Express series belonging to Indian Railways - South Western Railway zone that runs between Shivamogga Town and Bangalore City railway station in India.

It operates as train number 12090 from Shivamogga Town to Bangalore City railway station and as train number 12089 in the reverse direction serving the state of Karnataka. Early on, during inaugural run, the train only made it to Yesvantpur Jn.

It is among the latest trains introduced in the Jan Shatabdi Express series which were originally started by the then railway minister of India Mr. Nitish Kumar during the 2002–03 railway budget.

== Coaches ==
The 12090 / 89 Shivamogga Town KSR Bengaluru Jan Shatabdi Express has two AC Chair Car, 12 2nd Class seating and two End on Generator coaches. It does not carry a Pantry car coach As it is customary with most train services in India, Coach composition may be amended at the discretion of Indian Railways depending on demand.

== Service ==
The 12090 / 89 Shivamogga Town KSR Bengaluru Jan Shatabdi Express covers the distance of 274 km (170 mi) in 4 hours 15 mins averaging 64 km/h (40 mph) in both directions As per Indian Railways 55 km/h (34 mph), as per Indian Railways rules, its fare includes a Superfast surcharge.

== Route ==
The 12090 / 89 Shivamogga Town KSR Bengaluru Jan Shatabdi Express runs from Shivamogga Town via Bhadravati, Kadur Junction, Tumakuru to KSR Bengaluru. The 12090 / 89 Shivamogga Town KSR Bengaluru Jan Shatabdi Express runs daily in both directions

== Traction ==
Earlier, before the electrifying route is overdue, this train was pulled with WDP-4D on both inaugural run and commercial run. As the entire route is fully electrified, a Krishnarajapuram Loco Shed-based WAP-7 electric locomotive powers the train for its entire journey.
