= Haat Gamhariya block =

Haat Gamhariya Hāt Gāmahrīa
- Community development block
- Hat Gamaria block
- Interactive map of Haat Gamhariya
- Coordinates: 22°16′13″N 85°44′25″E
- Country: India
- State: Jharkhand
- District: West Singhbhum
- Named for: Haat Gamhariya village

Government
  - Type: Federal Democracy

Area
  - Total: 294.6 km^{2} (113.7 sq mi)
- Highest elevation: 610 m (2,000 ft)
- Lowest elevation: 136 m (446 ft)

Population (2011)
  - Total: 67,226
  - Density: 228.2/km^{2} (591.0/sq mi)

Languages
  - Official: Hindi • Ho
- Time zone: UTC+5:30 (IST)
- PIN: 833214
- Vehicle registration: JH-06
- Sex ratio: 1012♀/1000♂
- Lok Sabha Constituency: Singhbhum
- Vidhan Sabha Constituency: Majhgaon (53)
- Website: chaibasa.nic.in

Haat Gamhariya is a community development block in West Singhbhum district of Indian state of Jharkhand state. The administrative headquarters is at Hat Gamaria. The block approximately covers an area of 296 square kilometres (114 sq mi) and has a population of 67,226 people, in 13,503 households.

== Geography ==
Haat Gamhariya is located 33km away from Chaibasa, 95km away from Jamshedpur, and 175km away from Ranchi.

== Demographics ==
As per 2011 census, Haat Gamhariya has a population of 67,226 people with 33,414 being males and 33,812 being females. Children population (0-6years) is 13,230 children, making it 19.68% of the block's population.

Religions in Haat Gamhariya:
1. Hinduism (24.8%)
2. Christianity (0.41%)
3. Islam (0.07%)
4. Sikhism (0.02%)
5. Buddhism (0.01%)
6. Traditional (74.4%)
7. Not stated (0.30%)
Source: Census of India

Traditional & Adivasi religions followers are 50,043 people, making up 74.44% of the population. Hinduism is second most popular religion in Haat Gamhariya, with 16,644 people following it, making up 24.76% of the population. 202 people have not their religions stated yet.

=== Education ===
The literacy rate is 48.81%, with male literacy being 61.07% and female literacy being 36.66%. It is lower than national average of 80.88%.

=== Castes ===
The scheduled tribes population is 49,684 and scheduled castes population is 1,641. Non indigenous population is 15,901.

1. Scheduled castes (2.40%)
2. Scheduled tribes (73.9%)
3. Not indigenous (23.7%)

== Economy ==
=== Livelihood ===
Livelihood in Haat Gamhariya:
1. Cultivators (35.5%)
2. Agricultural labourers (49.5%)
3. Household industries (2.70%)
4. Other Workers (12.3%)

The worker participation rate is 48%. There are 10,971 main workers and 21,333 marginal workers in Haat Gamhariya, totalling 32,304 workers. There are 17,686 male workers and 14,618 female workers. The primary employment is agricultural labourers, with 33,277 people participating in it.
