= Howrah–Patna Jan Shatabdi Express =

Jan Shatabdi Express train in India

Patna Junction – Howrah Junction Jan Shatabdi Express
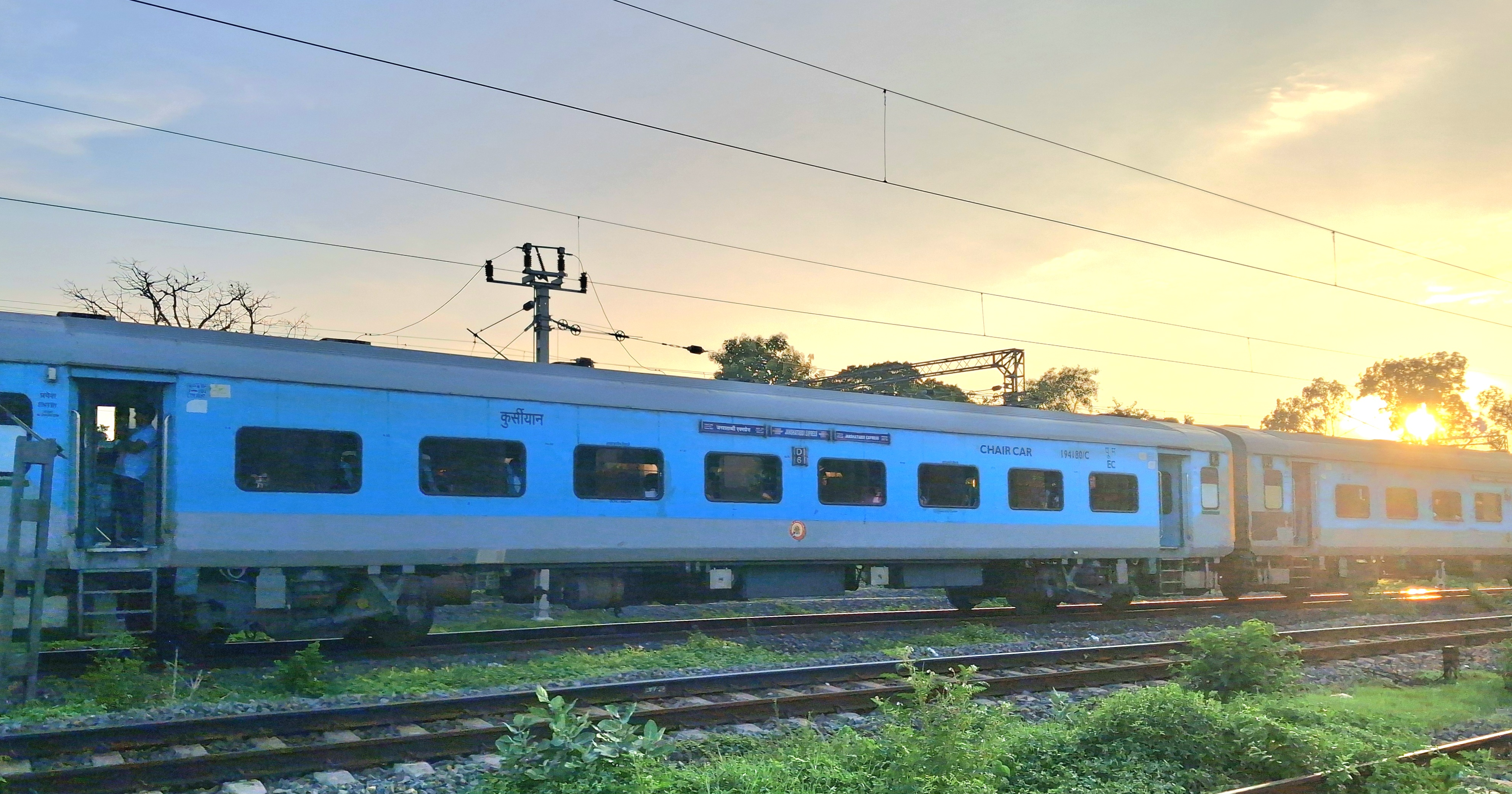
- Howrah - Patna Janshatabdi Express departing Madhupur Junction

Overview
- Service type: Jan Shatabdi Express
- Locale: Bihar, Jharkhand & West Bengal
- First service: November 2003. It replaced Patna - Howrah Shatabdi Express which was introduced on 12 Nov 2001
- Current operator: East Central Railways (ECR)

Route
- Termini: Patna Junction (PNBE); Howrah Junction (HWH)
- Stops: 14
- Distance travelled: 532 km (331 mi)
- Average journey time: 7 hours 40 minutes as 12024, 8 hours 10 minutes as 12023.
- Service frequency: Six days a week (Note: Except Sundays)
- Train number: 12023 / 12024

On-board services
- Classes: AC Chair Car, Non AC Chair Car
- Seating arrangements: Yes
- Sleeping arrangements: No
- Auto-rack arrangements: No
- Catering facilities: On-board catering E-catering
- Observation facilities: Rake Sharing With 12365/12366 Patna–Ranchi Jan Shatabdi Express
- Baggage facilities: Overhead racks

Technical
- Rolling stock: LHB coach
- Track gauge: 1,676 mm (5 ft 6 in)
- Electrification: Yes
- Operating speed: 130 km/h (80 mph) maximum, 67.20 km/h (41.76 mph) average including halts

The Patna – Howrah Jan Shatabdi Express is a Superfast Express train of the Jan Shatabdi Express series belonging to Indian Railways – East Central Railway zone that runs between Patna Junction and Howrah Junction in India.

It operates as train number 12024 from Patna Junction to Howrah Junction and as train number 12023 in the reverse direction, serving the states of Bihar, Jharkhand and West Bengal.

== History ==
It replaced a Shatabdi Express from Patna to Howrah (introduced on 12 Nov 2001) due to low patronage of the Shatabdi Express.

The Jan Shatabdi Express train was launched by the former railway minister of India, Nitish Kumar in the 2002-03 Railway Budget.

== Coach composition ==
12024/12023 Patna - Howrah Jan Shatabdi Express runs with 22 LHB Coaches in the following composition:

- 3 AC Chair Car (CC)
- 17 Second Seating (2S)
- 1 Second Seating Luggage and Brake Van (2S)
- 1 Generator Luggage and Brake Van (EOG)

Patna Howrah Jan Shatabdi is run with two rakes, in a rake sharing arrangement (RSA) with Patna - Ranchi Jan Shatabdi Express and is maintained at the Rajendra Nagar Coaching Centre, located at Rajendra Nagar Terminal.

As is customary with most train services in India, coach composition may be amended at the discretion of Indian Railways depending on demand.

== Service ==
The 12024 Patna Junction–Howrah Jan Shatabdi Express covers the distance of 532 km (331 mi) in 7 hours 40 mins (69.39 km/h) and in 8 hours 10 mins as 12023 Howrah–Patna Junction Jan Shatabdi Express (65.14 km/h).

As the average speed of the train is above 55 km/h (34 mph), as per Indian Railways rules, its fare includes a Superfast surcharge.

12024 is 2nd fastest in terms of time(1st being 12306 Howrah Rajdhani Express which takes 7hrs 20 mins from Patna Junction to Howrah Junction) and it takes around 7hrs 40 mins to cover entire journey from Patna to Howrah.

It is also the second fastest of all Jan Shatabdi Express in terms of speeds.

Stops of 12024/23 Patna Jan Shatabdi Express:

- Patna Junction PF5
- Patna Sahib PF1
- Bakhtiyarpur Junction PF1
- Barh PF2
- Mokama Junction PF1
- Hathidah Junction PF1
- Lucckesarai Junction PF2
- Jamui PF2
- Jhajha PF2
- Jasidih Junction PF1
- Madhupur Junction PF3
- Jamtara PF2
- Chittaranjan PF2
- Asansol Junction PF5
- Durgapur PF4
- Howrah Junction PF9

== Routeing ==
The 12024 / 23 Patna Junction–Howrah Jan Shatabdi Express runs from Patna Junction via Mokama Junction, Jamui, Jhajha, Madhupur Junction, Asansol Junction to Howrah Junction.

== Traction ==
As the entire route is fully electrified, a Gomoh, Samastipur,-based WAP-7 locomotive powers the train for its entire journey.

== Operation ==
- 12023 Howrah–Patna Junction Jan Shatabdi Express runs from Howrah Junction on all days except Sunday arriving Patna Junction the same day.
- 12024 Patna Junction–Howrah Jan Shatabdi Express runs from Patna Junction on all days except Sunday arriving Howrah Junction the same day.

== Rake sharing ==
The 12024 / 23 Patna Junction–Howrah Jan Shatabdi Express shares its rake with 12365 / 66 Patna–Ranchi Jan Shatabdi Express.
