= Patna–Ranchi Jan Shatabdi Express =

Jan Shatabdi Express train in India

Patna Junction – Ranchi Junction Jan Shatabdi Express

Overview
- Service type: Superfast Express, Jan Shatabdi Express
- First service: 10 January 2010; 16 years ago
- Current operator: East Central Railways

Route
- Termini: Patna Junction (PNBE); Ranchi (RNC)
- Stops: 10
- Distance travelled: 411 km (255 mi)
- Average journey time: 7 hours 45 minutes as 12365; 7 hours 55 minutes as 12366
- Service frequency: Daily service
- Train number: 12365/12366

On-board services
- Classes: AC Chair Car, Second Class seating
- Seating arrangements: Yes
- Sleeping arrangements: No
- Catering facilities: No
- Observation facilities: Chair Car LHB Rakes
- Baggage facilities: Overhead racks

Technical
- Rolling stock: LHB coach
- Track gauge: 1,676 mm (5 ft 6 in)
- Electrification: Yes
- Operating speed: 130 km/h (80 mph) maximum (Gaya–Gomoh); 53 km/h (33 mph) average speed

The 12365/12366 Patna Junction–Ranchi Jan Shatabdi Express is a Superfast Express train of the Jan Shatabdi Express series belonging to Indian Railways – East Central Railway zone that runs between Patna Junction and Ranchi Junction in India.

It operates as train number 12365 from Patna Junction to Ranchi Junction and as train number 12366 in the reverse direction, serving the states of Bihar and Jharkhand.

It is part of the Jan Shatabdi Express series launched by the former railway minister of India, Mr. Nitish Kumar in the 2002–03 Railway Budget.

== Coaches ==
The 12365/66 Patna–Ranchi Jan Shatabdi Express has three AC Chair Car, 17 Second Class seating, one Power Car coach and one LSLRD. It does not carry a pantry car.

As is customary with most train services in India, coach composition may be amended at the discretion of Indian Railways depending on demand.

== Service ==
The 12365 Patna Junction–Ranchi Junction Jan Shatabdi Express covers the distance of 411 km (255 mi) in 7 hours 45 mins (56.05 km/h (34.83 mph)) and in 7 hours 55 mins as 12366 Ranchi Junction–Patna Junction Jan Shatabdi Express (57.08 km/h (35.47 mph)).

As the average speed of the train is above 55 km/h (35 mph), as per Indian Railways rules, its fare includes a Superfast surcharge.

== Traction ==
As the entire route is fully electrified, it is regularly hauled by a Gomoh- or Howrah-based WAP-7 locomotive on its entire journey.

== Operation ==
- 12365 Patna Junction–Ranchi Junction Jan Shatabdi Express runs from Patna Junction on a daily basis arriving Ranchi Junction the same day.
- 12366 Ranchi Junction–Patna Junction Jan Shatabdi Express runs from Ranchi Junction on a daily basis arriving Patna Junction the same day.

== Rake sharing ==
The 12365/66 Patna Junction–Ranchi Junction Jan Shatabdi Express shares its rake with 12023/24 Patna–Howrah Jan Shatabdi Express.
