= Guwahati–Dibrugarh Intercity Express =

Overview
- Service type: Intercity
- Status: Operating
- Locale: Assam
- First service: 15 August 1998; 28 years ago
- Last service: November 2021
- Current operator: Northeast Frontier Railway

Route
- Termini: Guwahati (GHY); Dibrugarh (DBRG)
- Stops: 30
- Distance travelled: 559 km (347 mi)
- Average journey time: 15 hours 25 minutes
- Service frequency: Daily
- Train number: 15605 / 15606

On-board services
- Classes: AC 2 tier, AC 3 tier, sleeper 3 tier, unreserved
- Sleeping arrangements: Yes
- Observation facilities: ICF coach

Technical
- Operating speed: 37 km/h (23 mph) average with halts
Route map
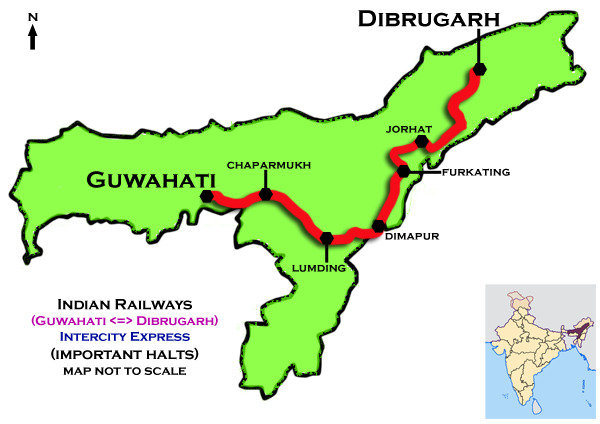

The Guwahati–Dibrugarh Intercity Express was a daily intercity express train which runs between Guwahati railway station in Guwahati, the capital city of Assam, and Dibrugarh railway station of Dibrugarh in upper Assam.

== Time table ==
- From Guwahati to Dibrugarh (15605) – departure from Guwahati (GHY) 19:45 IST; arrival at Dibrugarh (DBRG) 11:30 IST.
- From Dibrugarh to Guwahati (15606) – departure from Dibrugarh (DBRG) 14:25 IST; arrival at Guwahati (GHY) 05:30 IST.
