= Danguwapasi =

- Census Town
- Location in Jharkhand, India Danguwapasi (India)
- Coordinates: 22.17°N 85.59°E
- Country: India
- State: Jharkhand
- District: Pashchimi Singhbhum

Population (2001)
  - Total: 5,174

Languages
  - Official: Hindi, Santali, Ho
- Time zone: UTC+5:30 (IST)
- Vehicle registration: JH

Danguwapasi is a census town in Pashchimi Singhbhum district in the state of Jharkhand, India.

== Demographics ==
As of 2001 India census, Danguwapasi had a population of 5,174. Males constitute 53% of the population and females 47%. Danguwapasi has an average literacy rate of 68%, higher than the national average of 59.5%; male literacy is 78% and female literacy is 56%. In Danguwapasi, 14% of the population is under 6 years of age.

== Transport ==
=== Railway ===
Danguwapasi is also a railway station, which is known as Dangoaposi, as per railway records. It falls on Tatanagar–Barbil line of SER. (See Tatanagar–Bilaspur section of Howrah-Nagpur-Mumbai line).

There are many trains passing through Dangoaposi and all of these trains have stoppage at Dangoaposi such as-

•Howrah-Barbil Jan Shatabdi Express (Train No. - 12021/12022) running daily,

•Adityapur-Visakhapatnam Weekly Superfast Express (Train No. - 20815/20816) running every Monday,

•Puri-Anand Vihar Weekly Express (Train No. - 18427 running every Saturday and Train No. - 18428 running every Monday),

•Barbil-Puri Intercity Express (Train No. 18415/18416) running daily,

•Tatanagar-Barbil MEMU Passenger (Train No. - 68125/68126) running daily,

•Tatanagar-Gua MEMU Passenger (Train No. - 68019/68020) running daily,

•Tatanagar-Gua MEMU Passenger (Train No. - 68003/68004) running on all week days except Sunday.

=== Air ===
An air strip is located at a distance of 4 km from Dangoaposi and is in operation and maintained by Tata Steel.
