= Rajkharsawan Junction railway station =

Railway Station in Jharkhand

Rajkharsawan Junction Railway Station

General information
- Location: Kharswan Rd, Seraikela Kharsawan district, Jharkhand; India
- Coordinates: 22.7120683°N 85.7887237°E
- System: Express train and Passenger train station
- Owner: Indian Railways
- Operator: South Eastern Railway
- Lines: Howrah–Nagpur–Mumbai line Tatanagar–Chaibasa–Gua branch line
- Platforms: 4

Construction
- Structure type: Standard (on-ground station)

Other information
- Status: Functioning
- Station code: RKSN
- Zone(s): South Eastern Railway zone
- Division(s): Chakradharpur

History
- Former names: Bengal Nagpur Railway
Location
- Location within India Location within Jharkhand

Rajkharsawan Junction Railway Station is a railway station on Howrah–Nagpur–Mumbai line under Chakradharpur railway division of South Eastern Railway zone. It is situated at Rajkharsawan, Seraikela Kharsawan district in the Indian state of Jharkhand. It is 42 km (26 mi) from Tatanagar Junction and 20 km (12 mi) from Chakradharpur railway station.
