= Chakradharpur =

Chakradharpur Porahat
- City
- Nickname: City of hills
- Interactive map of Chakradharpur
- Location in Jharkhand, India
- Coordinates: 22.7°N 85.63°E
- Country: India
- State: Jharkhand
- District: West Singhbhum
- Established: 1890
- Founder: British Governor
- Named for: Railway division headquarter of South Eastern Railway

Area
  - Total: 24 km^{2} (9.3 sq mi)
- Elevation: 227 m (745 ft)

Population (2011)
  - Total: 56,531
  - Density: 2,400/km^{2} (6,100/sq mi)

Languages
  - Official: Hindi
  - Additional official languages: Angika; Bengali; Bhojpuri; Ho; Kharia; Khortha; Kurmali; Kurukh; Magahi; Maithili; Mundari; Nagpuri; Odia; Santali; Urdu
- Time zone: UTC+5:30 (IST)
- PIN: 833102
- Telephone code: 916587
- Vehicle registration: JH-06
- Sex ratio: 1000:999 ♂/♀
- Website: http://www.jharkhand.gov.in

Chakradharpur is a city in West Singhbhum district in the state of Jharkhand, India. It is the railway divisional headquarters of Chakradharpur (CKP) division of the South Eastern Railway. The city stands at an elevation of 227 metres (745 feet) and has urban area of 10 square kilometres bounded on the east by Jamshedpur (Tatanagar), on the west by Rourkela (Odisha), on the north by Ranchi (state capital of Jharkhand) and on the south by Chaibasa (district town of West Singhbhum district). Chakradharpur is close to boundaries of two neighbouring states, Odisha and West Bengal.

Chakradharpur is one of the divisions of Indian Railways under the zone South Eastern Railway.

== Geography ==
Chakradharpur is located at 22.7°N 85.63°E. It has an average elevation of 227 metre (745 ft). It is covered by mountains on most sides, and the river Sanjay running in the south-eastern periphery. Chakradharpur is believed to have been a quasi-hill station in the mid-1900s.

== Demographics ==
As of 2011 Indian Census, Chakradharpur nagar parishad had a total population of 56,531 of which 28,932 were males and 27,599 were females. Population within the age group of 0 to 6 years was 6,467. The total number of literates in Chakradharpur was 42,940, which constituted 75.9% of the population with male literacy of 81.0% and female literacy of 70.7%. The effective literacy rate of 7+ population of Chakradharpur was 85.8%, of which male literacy rate was 91.6% and female literacy rate was 79.6%. The Scheduled Castes and Scheduled Tribes population was 4,972 and 8,648 respectively. Chakradharpur had 11,472 households in 2011.

In the 2001 India census, Chakradharpur had a population of 38,352. Males constituted 52% of the population and females 48%. 5,102 persons were in the age range of 0 to 6 years. The total number of literates were 27,666 which is 72.1% of the total population. the effective literacy rate was Chakradharpur had an average literacy rate of 56.93%. The effective literacy of 7+ population was 83.2%.

=== Languages ===
Hindi is the official language of the town and also the language of the majority of the people. It is followed by Odia, Bengali, Ho, Santhali, Mundari, Bhojpuri and Urdu, which are also additional official languages.

Languages spoken in Chakradharpur Town (2011)
1. Hindi (25.9%)
2. Urdu (18.5%)
3. Odia (17.5%)
4. Bengali (9.50%)
5. Ho (7.67%)
6. Santali (4.31%)
7. Bhojpuri (3.35%)
8. Others (13.1%)

== Residential sections ==
The Chakradharpur subdivision can be divided into three residential sections.

=== Village panchayat ===
There are many villages within Chakradharpur City, including Joro, Deogaon, danti Toklo, Dukri, Duriyam, Bharniya, Patadih, Janta, Nalita, Heselkuti, Kaida, Kudahatu, Kimirda, Gunja, Sarjamhatu, Roladih, Bagmara, Unchibita, Ramda, Tikarchampi, Jharjhara, hoyohatu, Bindasarjom, Jaipur, Banalata, Jodo, Boddar, Dalki, Ponasi, Godamdipa, Pulkani, Jamtuti, Simidiri, Hathiya, Setahaka, Etor, Kolchokra, Kera, Kansara, Dantibegna, Laudiya, Padampur, Jamid, Silphori, Chainpur, Chelabera, Chirubera, Jantalbera, Gopinathpur, Kendo, Chandri, Simidiri, Baipai, Itihasa, Asantalia, Chandri, Borda, Ulidhi, Burigora, Gulkera, Pokuabera, Pusalota, Jenabera, Guigam, Komal, Roboga, Dhangaon, Tuiyia, Kulitondag. There are many more villages under the Chakradharpur subdivision.

=== Nagar Parishad area ===
The Nagar Parishad area is divided into 23 wards. Starting with the Purani Basti, the oldest area of Chakradharpur city, the King's Castle is present here. The kings of the Singh Dynasty resided here during the British era. This area witnessed the wars with the Britishers. The city's oldest Durga Puja, said to be started by the king himself, is celebrated here. It's known as the Adi Durga Puja Samity and was established in 1912.

=== Railway Colony ===
The Railway Colony comprises three wards. It covers the major part of Chakradharpur, located on the northeastern side of the NH-75E. The colony was established during the British era, and is a well planned city. All the railway establishments are present here. There are about 8,000 staff quarters.

The colony is further divided into different colonies such as the East Colony, R.E. Colony, Driver's Colony, Doubling Colony, Loco Colony, Accounts Colony, and Etwari Bazar.

== Transport ==
=== Roadway ===
Chakradharpur (CKP) is well-connected by roads and trains to nearby towns and cities. Tatanagar (Jamshedpur) is the closest, just 85 kilometers away by road and a quick 50-minute train ride. Ranchi, another important city, is about 114 kilometers away and takes around 1 hour and 40 minutes to reach by road. Rourkela is a bit farther, about 200 kilometers away and takes around 3 hours to reach by road. Chaibasa, the nearest town, is only 20 kilometers away and a short 20-minute drive, although there's no direct train service to it from CKP.

Chakradharpur is one of the four divisional headquarters of the South Eastern Railway. The first rail line on Chakradharpur Division was opened on 22 January 1890 with the laying of the 72.25 miles (116.28 km) long Purulia-Chakradharpur rail line. The rail network on the main trunk route passing through Chakradharpur division was completed on 18 February 1891 when the Goilkera-Jharsuguda section was opened. With the opening of this section the main line route of Bengal Nagpur Railway (BNR) was completed. The official opening ceremony of the main line from Asansol to Nagpur, presided over by the Viceroy of India, Lord Lansdowne, was held at Chakradharpur station on 3 March 1891.

It is located on the Tatanagar–Bilaspur section of the Howrah-Nagpur-Mumbai line. Chakradharpur division serves the mineral and industrially rich areas of Jharkhand and Odisha. It is spread over East and West Singhbhum, Saraikela-Kharsawan, Simdega of Jharkhand and Jharsuguda, Keonjhar, Sundargarh and Mayurbhanj districts of Odisha. In this division lies the main corridor of freight and passenger traffic between eastern and western parts of the country. This region is aptly called the Heart of the South Eastern Railway. The development of the rail network in the area presently forming Chakradharpur division dates back to the original of the Bengal-Nagpur Railway, the precursor of the South Eastern Railway. The first rail line in the area serving Chakradharpur division was laid in 1890. Presently Chakradharpur division extends over a length of 741.705 route-km, of which 335.798 route-km are located over the state of Jharkhand and 405.907 km. The main line portion of the division extends over the Salgajhari-Jharsuguda portion covering a distance of 270.38 km.

In addition to the main line the division has a large number of branch lines covering Tatanagar-Badampahar, Gamharia-Kandra-Chandil, Sini-Kandra, Rajkharswan-Banspani, Padapahar-Bolani-Barbil, Bondamunda-Bimlagarh, Barsuan-Kiriburu and Rourkela-Birmitrapur sections. The importance of the route covered by the division stems from the fact that it serves six major steel plants located in the region: Rourkela Steel Plant; Bhilai Steel Plant; Durgapur Steel Plant; Bokaro Steel Plant; Tata Steel, Jamshedpur and IISCO Steel Plant, Burnpur. It also serves the cement belt of Bilaspur division and the heavy traffic in general merchandise on the Howrah-Mumbai trunk route. The division covers some of the most difficult and picturesque terrains of the South Eastern Railway, passing through the verdant forest of Saranda including the two Saranda tunnels on the main line between Mahadevsal and Posoita stations. The division loads bulk requirement of iron and manganese ores, dolomite, limestone and other raw materials for all major steel plants of the country. Two steel plants, Rourkela steel plant and TISCO at Jamshedpur, are located within the division. It serves the Sponge Iron Plant at Manikui and other ancillary industries spread around the two plants, as well as the cement factories located at Jhinkpani, Rajgangpur, Tatanagar, Dhutra and mini cement plants and sponge-iron manufacturing industries around Rourkela. The main commodities loaded on the division comprise raw material for steel plants, cement and other general merchandise. The Chakradharpur division has 86 stations.

Chakradharpur railway station is one of the important stations since its foundation. Mahatma Gandhi visited here to inspect the facilities during the British Rule, which he mentioned in his book Third class in Indian Railways.

== From the history ==
Justice Harihar Mahapatra mentioned his visit to Chakradharpur around 1916, in his book My Life, My Work.

The rich mineral deposits around the Sanjay-Binjay valley was mentioned in the book Prehistoric India by Panchanan Mitra. The book also tells about the cave paintings and natural belongings of the adjoining region, including facts from Mr. Anderson's collections and their visit during the early 20th century.

The rich presence of the Anglo Indian Community in Chakradharpur Railway Colony was mentioned in the book Pagan Love: Anglo Indian Story by Mervyn Rupert Welsh. The book also tells about the Burton Lake, which is now a hangout zone.

The Geological Survey of India says there is a rich deposit of a composite batholith of a banded trondhjemitic material intruded by tonalite, granodiorite, granite and alkali-feldspar granite which was metamorphosed and deformed by a F3 event, which they named "Chakradharpur Granite Gneiss".

Mahatma Gandhi mentioned his visit to Chakradharpur Railway Station in his book Third Class in Indian Railways.

Netaji Subhash Chandra Bose arrived Chakradharpur Railway Station on 18th March 1940 by train in disguise, from where he was received by his close associates and driven by a vintage car towards Ranchi to attend the Anti-Compromise Conference in Ramgarh.

== Notable people ==
- Sailesh Kumar Bandopadhyay, Indian activist, Gandhian and recipient of Padma Bhushan in 2010.
- Anna Kashfi, British Indian film actress who had a brief Hollywood career in the 1950s and Marlon Brando's first wife.
- Deep Sengupta, Indian chess player and Grandmaster.
