= Barbil railway station =

Railway Station in Odisha, India

Barbil

General information
- Location: Barbil, Dt. Kendujhar, Odisha; India
- Coordinates: 22°06′18″N 85°22′08″E
- Elevation: 477 m (1,565 ft)
- System: Indian Railways station
- Line: Rajkharsawan–Barajamda–Barbil branch line
- Platforms: 3
- Tracks: 5 ft 6 in (1,676 mm) broad gauge

Construction
- Structure type: Standard (on ground station)
- Parking: Available

Other information
- Status: Functioning
- Station code: BBN
- Zone(s): South Eastern Railway
- Division(s): Chakradharpur

History
- Opened: 1925
- Electrified: 1966–67
- Former names: Bengal Nagpur Railway
Location
- Location within Odisha Location within India

Barbil railway station, located in the Indian state of Odisha, serves Barbil in Kendujhar district.

== History ==
The Rajkharsawan–Dongoaposi line was opened in 1924 and extended to Gua in 1925.

Rajkharsawan–Dangoaposi section was electrified in 1960–61. It was extended to Noamundi in 1965–66. The Padapahar–Deojhar and Noamundi–Barajamda sections were electrified in 1966–67, and the same year electrification was extended to Gua and Bolanikhadan. The branch line between Rajkharsawan and Dongoaposi was one of the first routes on the Indian Railways to be electrified with 25 KV-AC traction.

== Iron ore ==
The area around Barbil has a number of private iron ore mines. The Barbil–Joda region is the highest iron ore-producing region in the country. The annual output is around 40 million tonnes of lump and fines. State-wise, Odisha is the largest producer of iron ore in the country. It is the basic raw material for sponge iron and steel producers, many of whom who do not have access to captive mines. Moreover, India exports nearly two-thirds of its iron ore production. Iron ore transport is a major task of the railway network in the region.

== Trains ==
There is a Jan Shatabdi from Barbil to Howrah, an express train to Puri, a passenger train to Tatanagar and an inter-city express to Rourkela.

Running train list:

- 18416/18415 Puri–Barbil–Puri intercity
- 12022/12021 Barbil–Howrah Jan Shatabdi Express
- 58109/58110 Tata–Gua Passenger
- 18403/18404 Barbil–Rourkela Intercity Express

Preceding station	Indian Railways	Following station
Barajamda towards ?	South Eastern Railway zone Tatanagar–Bilaspur section of Howrah–Nagpur–Mumbai line	Terminus
