= Puri–Barbil Express =

Puri-Barbil Express
Overview
- Service type: Express
- Current operator: East Coast Railway zone

Route
- Termini: Puri; Barbil
- Stops: 28
- Distance travelled: 398 km (247 mi)
- Average journey time: 10 hours 52 mins
- Service frequency: Daily
- Train number: 18416 / 18415

On-board services
- Classes: general unreserved, AC Chair car, Chair car
- Seating arrangements: Yes
- Sleeping arrangements: Yes
- Catering facilities: No
- Observation facilities: Rake sharing with 18403 / 18404 Chakradharpur–Barbil Intercity Express

Technical
- Rolling stock: Standard Indian Railways coaches
- Track gauge: 1,676 mm (5 ft 6 in)
- Operating speed: 42 km/h (26 mph)
Route map
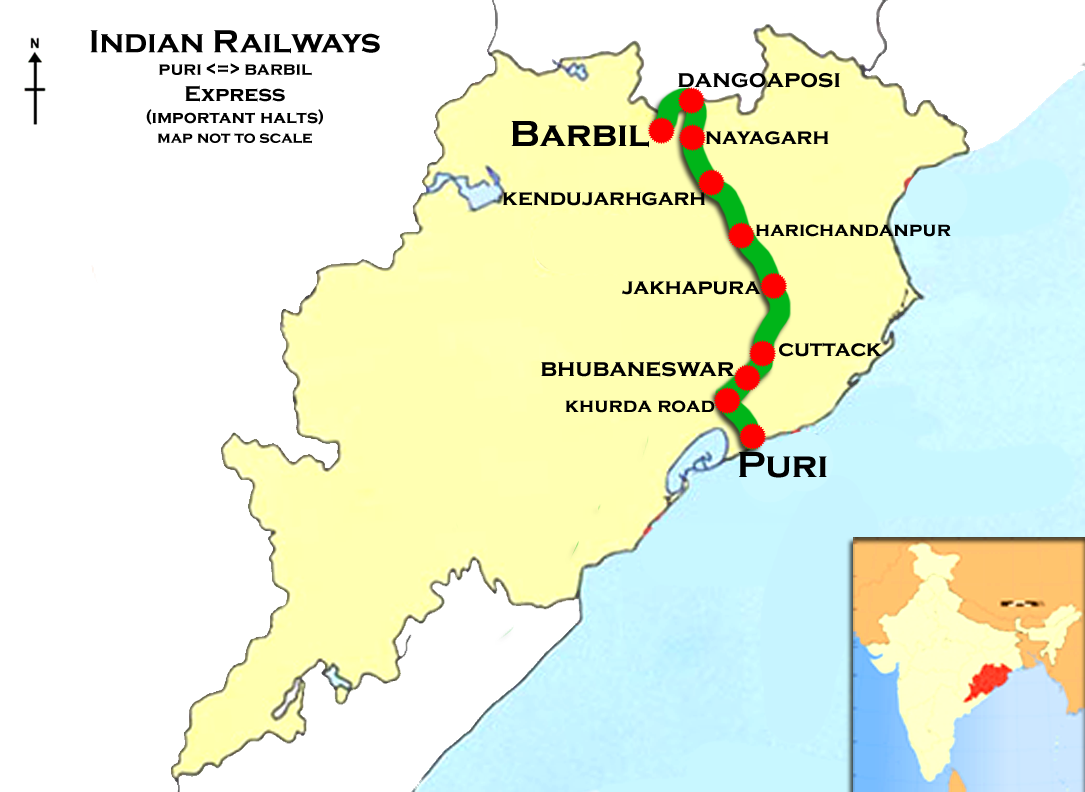

The 18416 / 15 Puri–Barbil Express is an Express train belonging to Indian Railways East Coast Railway zone that runs between Puri and Barbil in India.

It operates as train number 18416 from Puri to Barbil and as train number 18415 in the reverse direction, serving the states of Odisha & Jharkhand.

== Coaches ==
The 18416 / 15 Puri–Barbil Express has one AC Chair car, one Chair car, eight general unreserved & two SLR (seating with luggage rake) coaches. It does not carry a pantry car.

As is customary with most train services in India, coach composition may be amended at the discretion of Indian Railways depending on demand.

== Service ==
The 18416 Puri–Barbil Express covers the distance of 398 km (247 mi) in 10 hours 25 mins (38 km/h) and in 10 hours 40 mins as the 18415 Barbil–Puri Express (37 km/h).

As the average speed of the train is lower than 55 km/h (34 mph), as per railway rules, its fare doesn't includes a Superfast surcharge.

== Routing ==
The 18416 / 15 Puri–Barbil Express runs from Puri via Khurda Road Junction, Cuttack Junction, Dangoaposi to Barbil.

== Traction ==
As the route is electrified, a Visakhapatnam-based WAP-4 electric locomotive pulls the train to its destination.
