= Jalpaiguri Road railway station =

Railway station in West Bengal, India

Jalpaiguri Road
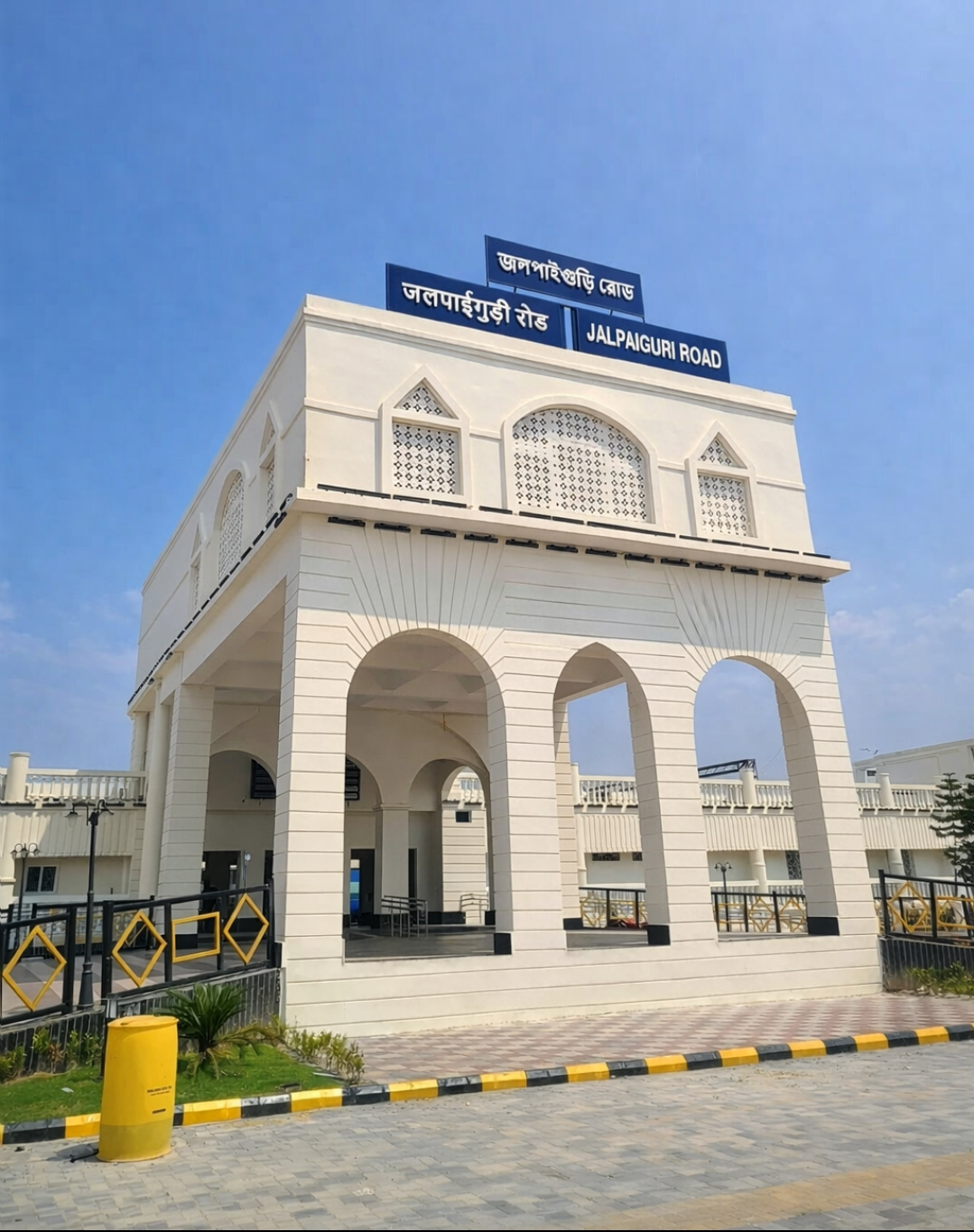
- Jalpaiguri Road railway station in 2026

General information
- Location: Railway Road, Patkata Colony, Danguajhar, Jalpaiguri, West Bengal; India
- Coordinates: 26.5594°N 88.7097°E
- Elevation: 84 metres (276 ft)
- System: Indian Railways junction station
- Owner: Indian Railways
- Operator: Northeast Frontier Railway
- Lines: Barauni–Guwahati line, New Mal–Changrabandha–New Cooch Behar line, New Jalpaiguri–Haldibari line, New Jalpaiguri–New Bongaigaon section
- Platforms: 3
- Tracks: 5

Construction
- Structure type: At grade
- Parking: Available

Other information
- Status: Functioning
- Station code: JPE
- Zone(s): NFR
- Division(s): Alipurduar

History
- Former names: North Bengal State Railway

Passengers
- 20-25K/𝗗𝗮𝘆
Location
- Location within West Bengal Location within India

Jalpaiguri Road railway station is one of the four railway station serving Jalpaiguri city in Jalpaiguri district in the Indian state of West Bengal. The others are: Jalpaiguri City, Mohitnagar/Jalpaiguri Halt, and Raninagar Jalpaiguri Junction railway station. It is a newly built station, connecting the Barauni–Guwahati line and the New Mal–New Changrabandha–New Cooch Behar line. Jalpaiguri Road Railway Station (JPE) was established in 1964. Operated by Northeast Frontier Railway. Jalpaiguri Road Railway Station (JPE) is located almost in the middle of the district. The nearest road to Jalpaiguri Road station is "Jalpaiguri - Siliguri State highway" and Four-lane East-West Corridor (National Highway) at a distance of 1 km. This station is part of the re-development project under Amrit Bharat Station Scheme.

== Major trains ==
- Kamakhya-Howrah Vande Bharat Sleeper Express
- Charlapalli–Kamakhya Amrit Bharat Express
- North East Express
- Vivek Express
- Padatik Express
- Uttar Banga Express
- Kamrup Express
- Avadh Assam Express
- Brahmaputra Mail
- Sealdah-Sabroom Kanchanjunga Express
- Teesta Torsha Express
- New Tinsukia–SMVT Bengaluru Weekly Express
- Sealdah-Silchar Kanchanjunga Express
- Kaziranga Superfast Express
- Dibrugarh-Rajendra Nagar Weekly Express
- Dibrugarh - Deogarh Express
- New Jalpaiguri–Bongaigaon Express
- Originating/Terminating Trains :
- Sealdah - Jalpaiguri Road Humsafar Express

== History ==
During the British period all connections from southern parts of Bengal to North Bengal were through the eastern part of Bengal. From 1878, the railway route from Kolkata, then called Calcutta, was in two laps. The first lap was a 185 km journey along the Eastern Bengal State Railway from Calcutta Station (later renamed Sealdah) to Damookdeah Ghat on the southern bank of the Padma River, then across the river in a ferry and the second lap of the journey. A 336 km metre-gauge line of the North Bengal Railway linked Saraghat on the northern bank of the Padma to Siliguri via Jalpaiguri.

The 1.8 km long Hardinge Bridge across the Padma came up in 1912. In 1926 the metre-gauge section north of the bridge was converted to broad gauge, and so the entire Calcutta–Siliguri route became broad-gauge. The route thus ran: Sealdah–Ranaghat–Bheramara–Hardinge Bridge–Iswardi–Santahar–Hili–Parabtipur–Nilphamari–Haldibari–Jalpaiguri–Siliguri.

With the partition of India, this track got trisected. The through route was formally closed after the India–Pakistan War in 1965.

The Siliguri–Haldibari, part of the original broad-gauge Calcutta–Siliguri track via Hardinge Bridge, got delinked from the trunk route in 1947. As all the other tracks in the area were metre gauge, it was converted from broad gauge to metre gauge in the late forties. When New Jalpaiguri railway station came up, the line was extended to New Jalpiguri. When broad-gauge lines were laid in the area, it was reconverted to broad gauge and now functions as the Haldibari–New Jalpaiguri line.

== Amenities ==
Jalpaiguri Road railway station provides a range of upgraded passenger amenities . The station includes improved waiting areas, seating arrangements, and modern ticket booking facilities. Clean drinking water and upgraded sanitation facilities are available within the station premises.

The station has food stalls and small vendors offering refreshments, along with free high-speed RailWire Wi-Fi for passengers. Advanced digital display boards provide real-time train arrival, departure, and coach position information.

The station has three platforms connected by two foot overbridges, with lift facilities ensuring enhanced accessibility. Divyangjan-friendly infrastructure, including ramps and accessible toilets, is available.

Additional facilities include extended platform shelters, improved parking arrangements. The station is well connected by local transport such as taxis, Toto and auto-rickshaws.

== See also ==
- North Eastern Railway Connectivity Project
- Jalpaiguri Railway Station

Preceding station	Indian Railways	Following station
Raninagar Jalpaiguri towards ?	Northeast Frontier Railway zone New Jalpaiguri–New Bongaigaon section	New Domohani towards ?
