= Jalpaiguri (disambiguation) =

Jalpaiguri is a city in the Indian state of West Bengal.

Jalpaiguri may also refer to:

- Jalpaiguri district
- Jalpaiguri division
- New Jalpaiguri railway station
- Jalpaiguri Junction railway station
- Jalpaiguri Town railway station
- Jalpaiguri Road railway station
- Jalpaiguri (Vidhan Sabha constituency)
- Jalpaiguri (Lok Sabha constituency)
- Jalpaiguri Assembly constituency
- Jalpaiguri (community development block)
- Jalpaiguri Zilla School
