= Darjeeling Mail =

Train in India

Overview
- Service type: Superfast
- First service: 1 January 1878; 148 years ago
- Current operator: Eastern Railway

Route
- Termini: Sealdah (SDAH); Haldibari (HDB)
- Stops: 6
- Distance travelled: 629 km (391 mi)
- Average journey time: 11 hours 20 minutes
- Service frequency: Daily
- Train number: 12343 / 12344

On-board services
- Classes: AC First Class, AC 2 Tier, AC 3 Tier, Sleeper Class, General Unreserved
- Seating arrangements: Yes
- Sleeping arrangements: Yes
- Catering facilities: On-board catering, E-catering
- Observation facilities: Large windows
- Baggage facilities: Available
- Other facilities: Below the seats

Technical
- Rolling stock: LHB coach
- Track gauge: 1,676 mm (5 ft 6 in)
- Operating speed: 55 km/h (34 mph) average including halts.
Route map
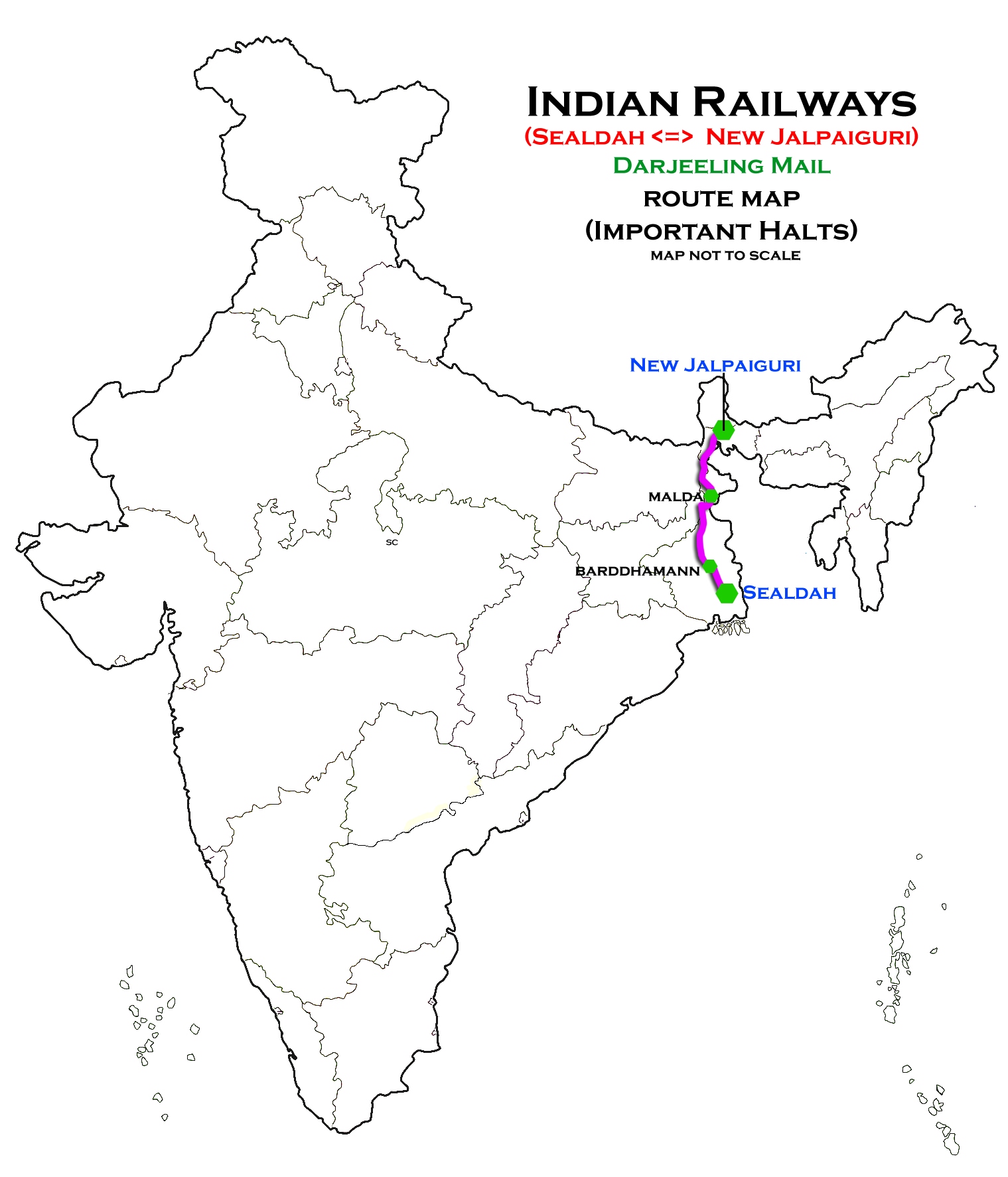

The 12343 / 12344 Darjeeling Mail is one of the oldest running trains in India. It connects Kolkata with Haldibari. This is a major train for Kolkata–Siliguri route.

== History ==
During the British period all connections to North Bengal were through East Bengal. From 1878, the railway route from Kolkata, then called Calcutta, to Siliguri was in two laps. The first lap was a 184.9 kilometres (114.9 mi) long journey along the Eastern Bengal State Railway from Calcutta Station (later renamed Sealdah) to Damookdeah Ghat on the southern bank of the Padma River. The passengers would then avail a ferry across the river. The second lap of the journey was a 363.1 kilometres (225.6 mi) metre-gauge line of the North Bengal Railway that linked Saraghat on the northern bank of the Padma to Siliguri.

The 1.8 kilometres (5,900 ft) long Hardinge Bridge across the Padma came up in 1912. In 1916 the metre-gauge section north of the bridge was converted to broad gauge, and so the entire Calcutta – Siliguri route became broad-gauge. The route thus roughly ran: Sealdah–Ranaghat–Bheramara–Hardinge Bridge–Iswardi–Santahar–Hili–Parbatipur–Nilphamari–Haldibari–Jalpaiguri–Siliguri. The train ran on this route in pre-partition days. Even after the partition of India it ran on this route for some years. So before Partition: The train's pre-partition route was roughly: Sealdah–Ranaghat–Bheramara–Hardinge Bridge–Iswardi–Santahar–Hili–Parbatipur–Nilphamari–Haldibari–Jalpaiguri–Siliguri.

With the partition of India in 1947, the major hurdle in connecting Kolkata and Siliguri was that there was no bridge across the Ganges in West Bengal or Bihar. A generally acceptable route to Siliguri was via Sahibganj loop to Rajmahal, then across the Ganges by ferry to Manihari Ghat on the other side, then to Kishanganj via Manihari, Katihar and Barsoi and finally through narrow gauge to Siliguri. In 1949 Kishanganj–Siliguri section too was converted to metre gauge, thus making the entire route a uni-gauge one. On 26 January 1950 Sealdah Siliguri ( BG/MG) North Bank mail via Kishanganj was introduced. In 1964 it was renamed as Darjeeling mail. From 1947 to 1965, the Darjeeling Mail ran from Sealdah to Siliguri, passing through stations like Ranaghat, Gede, Darsana, Santahar, Parbatipur, Nilphamari, and Jalpaiguri, before crossing the border to reach the destination. This route was used after the partition before the Indo-Pakistani War of 1965 disrupted the passenger services. Even after the partition of India, the Darjeeling Mail initially continued to operate on a similar route. The Gede and Darsana stations in India and East Pakistan (now Bangladesh) served as custom checkpoints. The services were halted after the Indo-Pakistani War of 1965, severing the route.

From 1965-1971, Darjeeling Mail was made to run via 2 phases. The train used to depart Sealdah at 12.50 pm & reach Barauni at 23.30 pm crossing the Rajendra Setu spanning 2,025 metres (6,644 ft) across the Ganges. Then it was a Meter Gauge journey of 364.8 kilometres (226.7 mi). The whole journey of 923.2 kilometres (573.6 mi) used to take 19 hrs 15 mins. In 1970, Barauni - New Jalpaiguri section was converted to Broad Gauge, speeding up the Darjeeling Mail & reduced time. New Jalpaiguri station was constructed in 1960-1965 period on a greenfield site south of Siliguri Town.

In the early 1970s, when Farakka Barrage was being constructed, a more radical change was made. Indian Railways created a new broad-gauge rail link from Kolkata, and connected New Jalpaiguri via New Farakka, Malda Town, Barsoi joining the Barauni - New Jalpaiguri section. The 2,256.25 metres (7,402.4 ft) long Farakka Barrage carries a rail-cum-road bridge across the Ganges. The rail bridge was thrown open to the public in 1971, thereby linking the Barharwa–Azimganj–Katwa loop & Sahibganj loop to Malda Town, Barsoi, Kishanganj, New Jalpaiguri and other railway stations in North Bengal. Since then Darjeeling Mail has been using the Howrah–New Jalpaiguri line. The train was numbered 3143 Up/3144 Down with Timings as follows: 3143 used to depart Sealdah at 19.15 pm, reaching New Jalpaiguri at 06.30 am next morning & 3144 used to depart New Jalpaiguri at 18.45 pm, reaching Sealdah at 06.00 am in next morning. This timings was prevalent until 2004, when Darjeeling Mail was renumbered as 2343/2344 & made Superfast by withdrawing some halts and journey time reduced. A slip train was introduced; consisting of a sleeper class and an AC-3 Tier coach. This service continued further to Haldibari from New Jalpaiguri. With the upgradation to LHB coaches, it was cancelled permanently and the entire train was extended till Haldibari. However this decision was met with apprehension as it was thought that it would reduce the importance of New Jalpaiguri station.

== Coach composition ==
This train runs with 22 Linke-Hoffman Busch coaches. It has two dedicated rakes with primary maintenance at Sealdah. It is an ISO 9001:2008 certified train.

Legends
EOG/SLR	PC	MIL	H	A	HA	B	AB	G	K	E	C	S	D	GEN/UR
Generator cum luggage van	Pantry car or Hot buffet car	Military coach	First AC (1A)	Second AC (2A)	First AC cum Second AC	Third AC (3A)	Third AC cum Second AC	Third AC economy (3E)	Anubhuti coach (K)	Executive chair car (EC)	AC Chair car (CC)	Sleeper class (SL)	Second seating (2S)	General or Unreserved
	Loco and other service coach													
	AC coach													
	Non-AC coach													

Coach Position of 12343 (ex. Sealdah)

Loco	1	2	3	4	5	6	7	8	9	10	11	12	13	14	15	16	17	18	19	20	21	22
	EOG	GEN	GEN	S1	S2	S3	S4	S5	S6	B1	B2	B3	B4	B5	B6	B7	A1	A2	H1	GEN	GEN	EOG

Coach Position of 12344 (ex. Haldibari)

Loco	1	2	3	4	5	6	7	8	9	10	11	12	13	14	15	16	17	18	19	20	21	22
	EOG	GEN	GEN	H1	A2	A1	B7	B6	B5	B4	B3	B2	B1	S6	S5	S4	S3	S2	S1	GEN	GEN	EOG

Passengers are advised to check the coach position indicators at the station before boarding.

== Service ==
- The 12343 Sealdah - Haldibari Darjeeling Mail leaves Sealdah at 22:15 hrs everyday and reaches Haldibari 9:40 am the next day at, covering 629 kms distance in 11 hrs 20 mins averaging at 64.00 km/h (39.77 mph).
- The 12344 Haldibari – Sealdah Darjeeling Mail leaves Haldibari at 18:15 hrs everyday and reaches Sealdah the next day at 05:00 hrs, covering 629 kms distance in 10 hrs 25 mins averaging at 63.60 km/h (39.52 mph).
- On its route, the train stops at Jalpaiguri, New Jalpaiguri Junction, Barddhaman Junction, Bolpur Shantiniketan, Malda Town, and Kishanganj stations.

== Traction ==
Since the route is completely electrified, this train is hauled entirely by a Howrah or a Sealdah based WAP-7 locomotive.

== See also ==
- Sealdah railway station
- New Jalpaiguri railway station
- Darjeeling Himalayan Railway
- Haldibari Railway Station
