= Teesta Torsha Express =

Express train in West Bengal, India

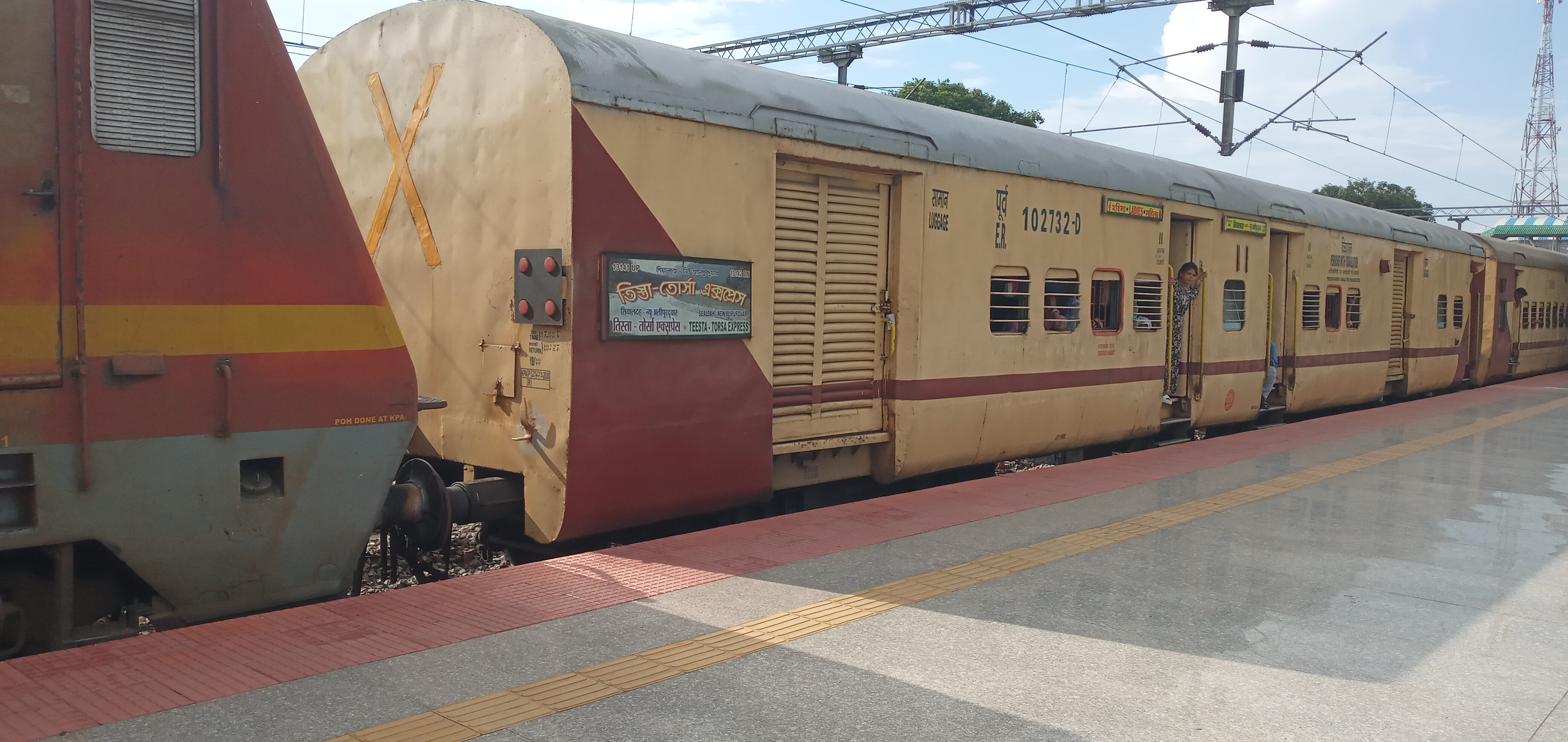
- Teesta Torsha Express in Aluabari Road

Overview
- Service type: Express
- Locale: West Bengal, Just touching Bihar
- Current operator: Eastern Railways

Route
- Termini: Sealdah; New Alipurduar
- Distance travelled: 629 km (391 mi)
- Average journey time: 14 hours 50 minutes
- Service frequency: Daily
- Train number: 13141 / 13142

On-board services
- Baggage facilities: Available

Technical
- Rolling stock: ICF coaches
- Track gauge: 1,676 mm (5 ft 6 in)
- Electrification: 25KV AC
- Operating speed: 49 km/h (30 mph)

The 13141 / 13142 Teesta Torsa Express is a daily non-superfast train in West Bengal, India which runs between Sealdah (SDAH) and New Alipurduar (NOQ) via Kalna, Nabadwip Dham,Katwa, Azimganj, Malda Town, New Jalpaiguri, Jalpaiguri Road railway station, Falakata & New Cooch Behar It passes through some important cities of West Bengal such as Berhampore, Malda, Siliguri, Jalpaiguri and Cooch Behar. It travels 718 km distance taking 17 hours with an average speed of 45 km/h.

Type: Express

Rake: UTKRISHT(ICF)

Rake Zone: ER

== Route and stoppages ==
1. Sealdah (starts)
2. Naihati Junction
3. Bandel Junction
4. Ambika Kalna
5. Nabadwip Dham
6. Katwa Junction
7. Salar
8. Bazarsau
9. Khagraghat Road
10. Azimganj Junction
11. Jangipur Road
12. Dhulian Ganga
13. New Farakka
14. Malda Town
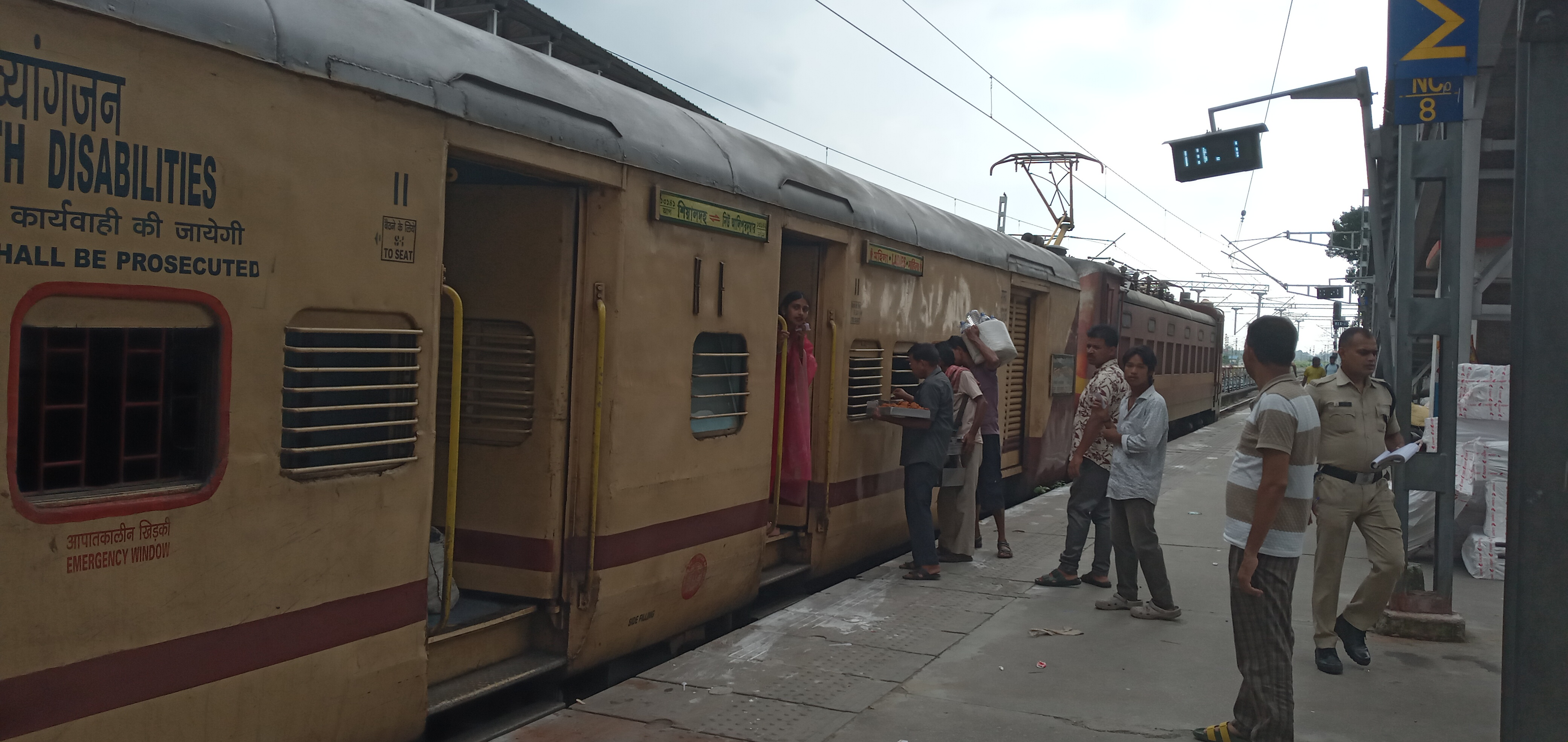
  Teesta Torsha Express in NJP
15. Samsi
16. Bhaluka Road
17. Harischandrapur
18. Barsoi Junction
19. Dalkhola
20. Kanki
21. Aluabari Road
22. New Jalpaiguri (Siliguri)
23. Belakoba
24. Raninagar Jalpaiguri Junction (Jalpaiguri)
25. Jalpaiguri Road railway station
26. New Maynaguri
27. Dhupguri
28. Falakata
29. Ghoksadanga
30. New Cooch Behar
31. New Alipurduar (Ends)

== Timing and schedule ==
13141 (UP) - Starts daily from Sealdah at Afternoon 15.00 and reaches New Alipurduar at 5.50 AM [as per latest revision in timings]

13142 (DOWN)- Starts daily from New Alipurduar at 12:20 PM and reach Sealdah next Day at Morning 3:45 AM
