= Malahar Halt railway station =

Railway station in West Bengal

General information
- Location: National Highway 81, Belungaon, Malda district, West Bengal; India
- Coordinates: 25°18′13″N 87°57′28″E
- Elevation: 30 m (98 ft)
- System: Passenger train station
- Owner: Indian Railways
- Operator: Northeast Frontier Railway
- Line: Howrah–New Jalpaiguri line
- Platforms: 2
- Tracks: 2

Construction
- Structure type: Standard (on ground station)
- Parking: No

Other information
- Status: Active
- Station code: MFZ
- Zone(s): Northeast Frontier Railway
- Division(s): Katihar

History
- Former names: East Indian Railway Company

Services
Preceding station	Indian Railways	Following station
Bhaluka Road towards ?	Eastern Railway zone Howrah–New Jalpaiguri line	Samsi towards ?
Location

Malahar Halt railway station is a halt railway station on the Howrah–New Jalpaiguri line of Katihar railway division of Northeast Frontier Railway Zone. It is situated beside National Highway 81, Belungaon of Malda district in the Indian state of West Bengal.
