= Kolkata–Haldibari Intercity Express =

Train in India

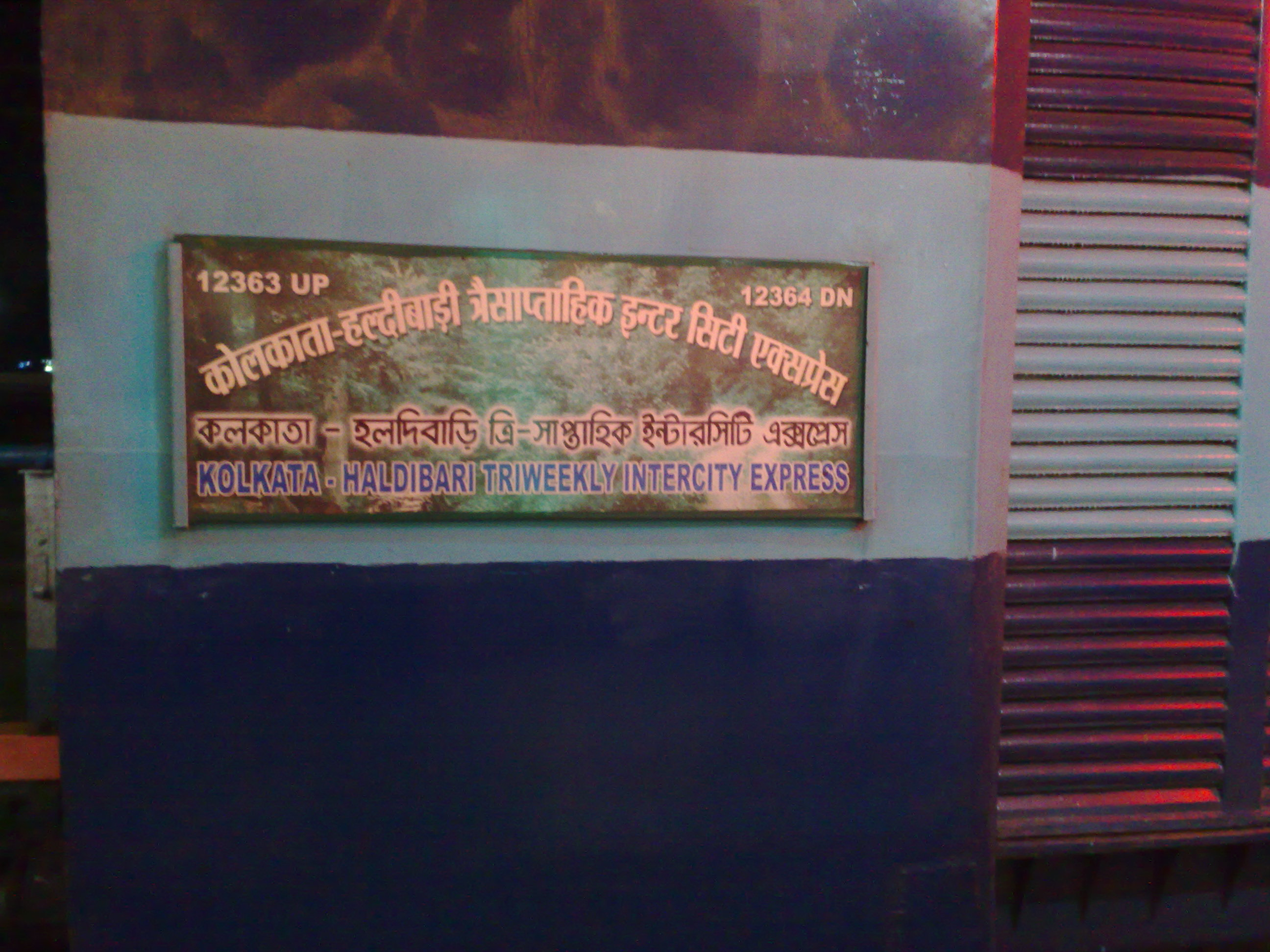

Overview
- Service type: Superfast
- First service: 3 July 2008
- Current operator: Eastern Railways

Route
- Termini: Kolkata; Haldibari
- Stops: 9
- Distance travelled: 620 km (385 mi)
- Average journey time: 11 hours 20 minutes as 12363 Kolkata–Haldibari Intercity Express, 11 hours 10 minutes as 12364 Haldibari–Kolkata Intercity Express
- Service frequency: 3 days a week. 12363 Kolkata–Haldibari Intercity Express – Tuesday, Thursday & Saturday. 12364 Haldibari–Kolkata Intercity Express – Wednesday, Friday & Sunday.
- Train number: 12363 / 12364

On-board services
- Classes: AC Chair Car, AC 3 Tier, Sleeper Class, Second Class seating, General Unreserved
- Seating arrangements: Yes
- Sleeping arrangements: Yes
- Catering facilities: No pantry car attached
- Observation facilities: Large Windows in AC Chair Car and AC 3 Tier .

Technical
- Rolling stock: ICF coach (Utkrisht)
- Track gauge: 1,676 mm (5 ft 6 in)
- Operating speed: 110 km/h (68 mph) maximum,55.11 km/h (34 mph), including halts
Route map
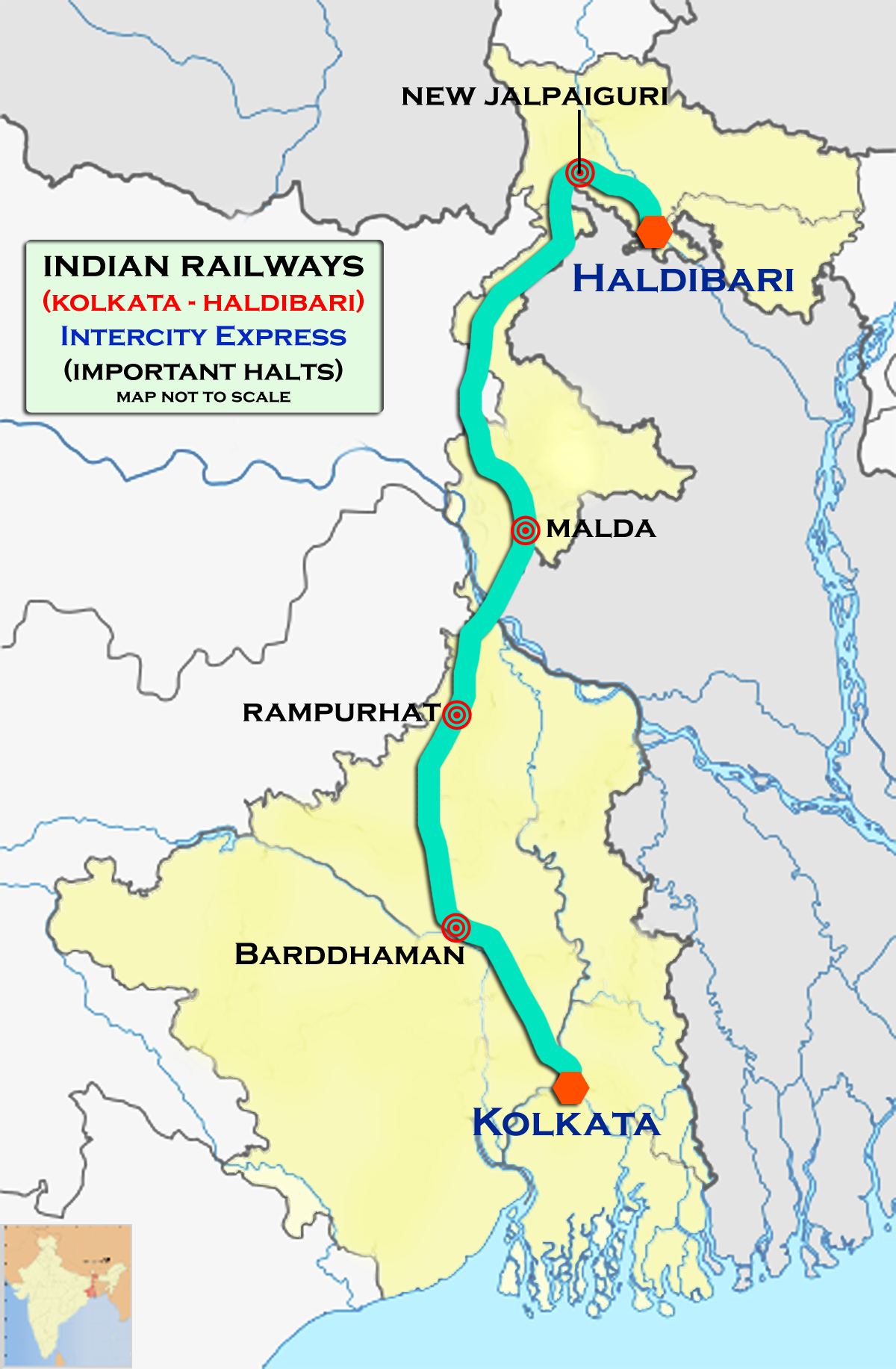

The 12363 / 64 Kolkata–Haldibari Intercity Superfast Express is a Superfast Express train of Indian Railways – Eastern Railway zone that runs between Kolkata and Haldibari via Barddhaman, Rampurhat, New Jalpaiguri (Siliguri) and Jalpaiguri in India. This is the longest running intercity express train in West Bengal.

It operates as train number 12363 from Kolkata to Haldibari and as train number 12364 in the reverse direction serving the states of West Bengal.

== Introduction ==
The train started in the year 2005 used to run between Sealdah and New Jalpaiguri with train no 12503/12504 belong to North East Frontier Railway and used to have only unreserved second-class seating. Later on this train was extended to Haldibari and originating station was changed from Sealdah to Kolkata Chitpur station. There is 2S and CC seating.

== Coaches ==
12363 / 64 Kolkata–Haldibari Intercity Express presently has 1 AC Chair Car, 4 AC 3 tier, 8 Second Class Seating(Reserved), 4 General Second Class(Unreserved), 5 Sleeper Class and 2 SLR (Seating cum Luggage Rake) coaches.

This train has total 26 coaches .

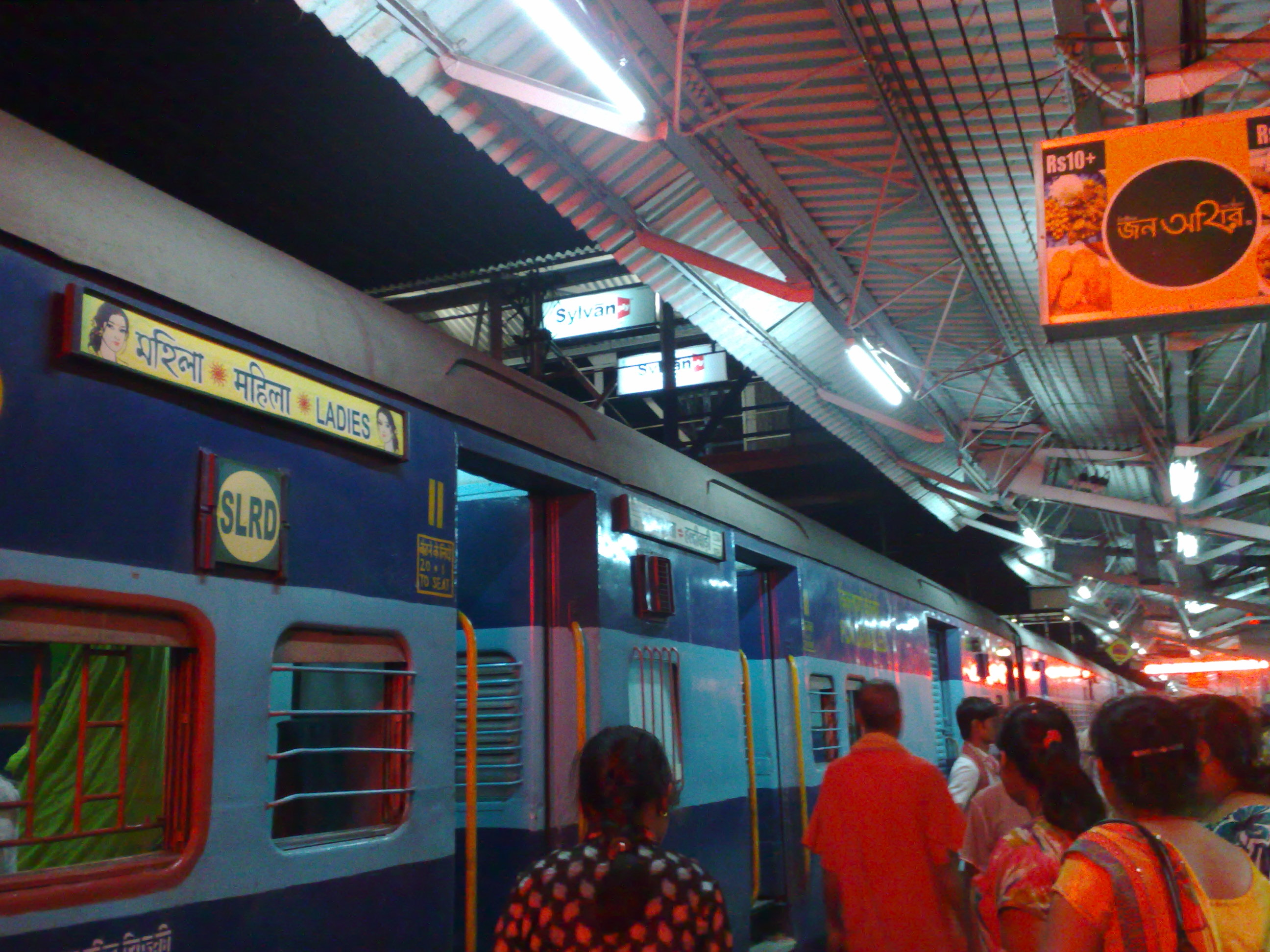
Kolkata–Haldibari Tri-Weekly Intercity Express – SLR Ladies coach

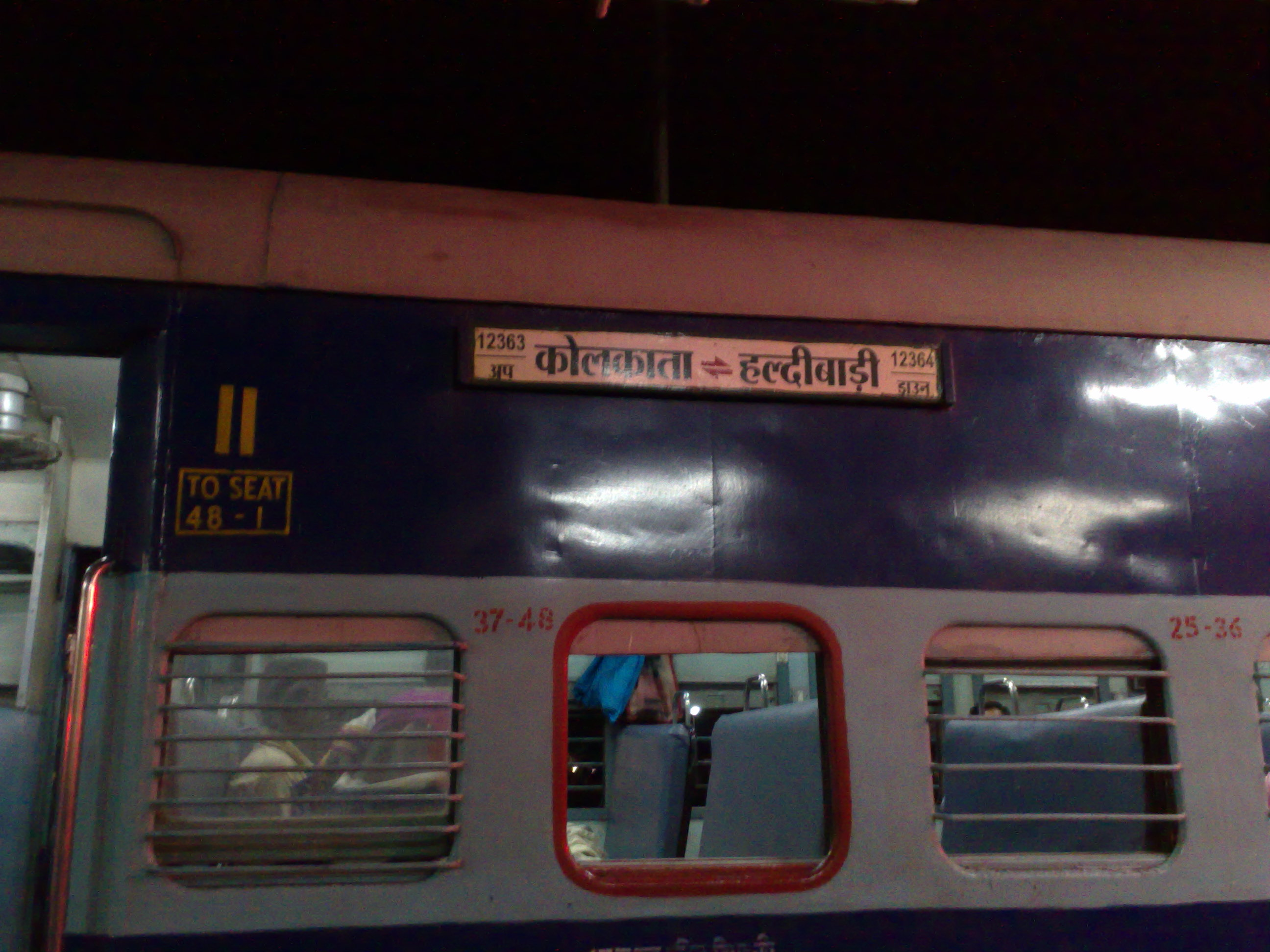
Kolkata–Haldibari Tri-Weekly Intercity Express – train board

== Service ==
The 12363 Kolkata–Haldibari Intercity Express covers the distance of 620 kilometres in 11 hours 20 mins (54.71 km/h) and in 11 hours 10 mins as 12364 Haldibari–Kolkata Tri Weekly Intercity Express (55.52 km/h).

As the average speed of the train is above 55 km/h (34 mph), as per Indian Railways rules, its fare includes a Superfast surcharge.

== Routeing ==
The 12363 / 64 Kolkata–Haldibari Intercity Express runs from

- Kolkata Via
- Barddhaman Junction
- Bolpur Shantiniketan
- Rampurhat Junction
- Pakur
- Malda Town
- Harischandrapur
- Kishanganj
- New Jalpaiguri (Siliguri)
- Jalpaiguri to
- Haldibari.

== Traction ==
Electric Loco WAP4, WAG9, WAP5 or also WAP7 from Electric Loco Shed of Howrah, hauls this train from Haldibari to Kolkata .

== Timings ==
- 12363 Kolkata–Haldibari Intercity Express leaves Kolkata every Tuesday, Thursday & Saturday at 09:05 hrs IST and reaches Haldibari at 20:20 hrs IST the same day.
- 12364 Haldibari–Kolkata Intercity Express leaves Haldibari every Wednesday, Friday & Sunday at 08:30 hrs IST and reaches Kolkata at 19:40 hrs IST the same day.
