= Central Plantation Crops Research Institute =

Indian research institute

Central Plantation Crops Research Institute, Kasaragod
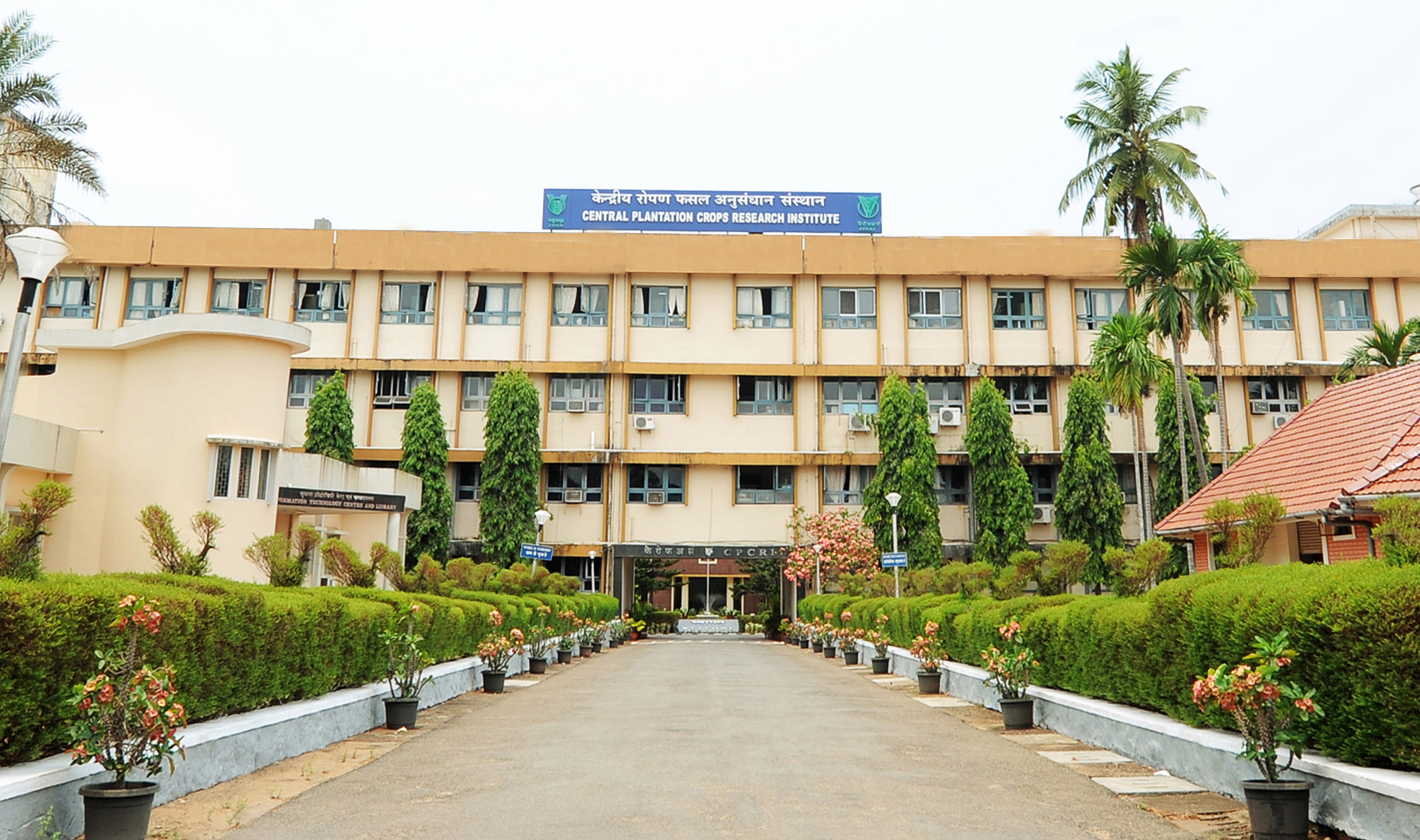
- Type: Public
- Established: 1974
- Academic affiliations: Indian Council of Agricultural Research
- Location: 12°30′N 74°54′E
- Website: cpcri.gov.in
- Location within Kerala Location within India

CPCRI New website url. https://cpcri.gov.in

The Central Plantation Crops Research Institute (CPCRI) https://cpcri.gov.in/page is a central research institute for plantation crops, headquartered in Kasargod, Kerala in India. It was established in 1970 as one of the agricultural research institutes in the National Agricultural Research System (NARS) under the Indian Council of Agricultural Research (ICAR), Government of India. The Institute has the mandate to undertake research on coconut, areca nut, palmyra, and cocoa.

== History ==
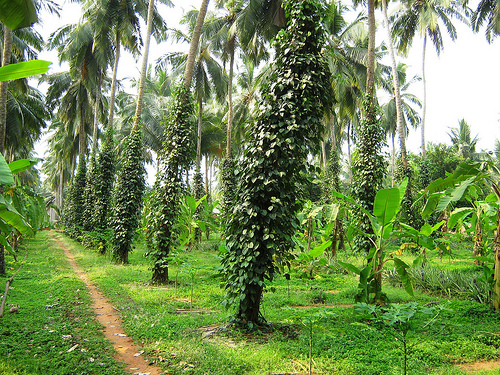
CPCRI Kasaragod

The institute was established in 1916 as Coconut Research Station at Kasargod, and was later taken over by the Indian Council of Agricultural Research (ICAR). Central Plantation Crops Research Institute was established by ICAR in 1970 by merging Central Coconut Research Station at Kasaragod and Kayamkulam, along with Central Arecanut Research Station, Vittal and its five substations at Palode (Kerala), Kannara (Kerala), Hirehalli (Karnataka), Mohitnagar (West Bengal) and Kahikuchi (Assam).

All India Co-ordinated Coconut and Arecanut Improvement Project (AICCAIP) started functioning from 1972 at CPCRI, Kasaragod and later renamed as All India Coordinated Research Project on Palms (AICRP) in 1986. The AICRP has 14 centres on coconut, four on oil palm and one on palmyra.

== Research ==
Initially mandated to conduct research on coconut, areca nut, cocoa, cashew, oil palm, and spices, the institute later separated research on cashew, oil palm, and spices to establish independent institutes. In 2023, the CPCRI expanded its mandate to include palmyra palm.

The institute's research programs are structured into five divisions:

- Crop Improvement
- Crop Production
- Crop Protection
- Physiology
- Biochemistry
- Post Harvest Technology
- Social Sciences.

Additionally, it oversees the International Coconut Gene Bank for South Asia situated at Kidu in Karnataka. Serving as the headquarters of the All India Co-ordinated Research Project (AICRP) on palms, it manages 28 centers spread across 14 states and one union territory, encompassing 13 SAUs/SHUs, one CAU, and four ICAR institutes.

There are two regional stations at Kayamkulam (Kerala) and Vittal (Karnataka). There are four research centres at Mohitnagar (West Bengal), Kahikuchi (Assam), and Kidu (Karnataka). Besides, there are two Krishi Vigyan Kendra (KVKs) in Kasaragod and Kayamkulum.
