= Jalpaiguri railway station =

Railway station in Jalpaiguri, India

Jalpaiguri
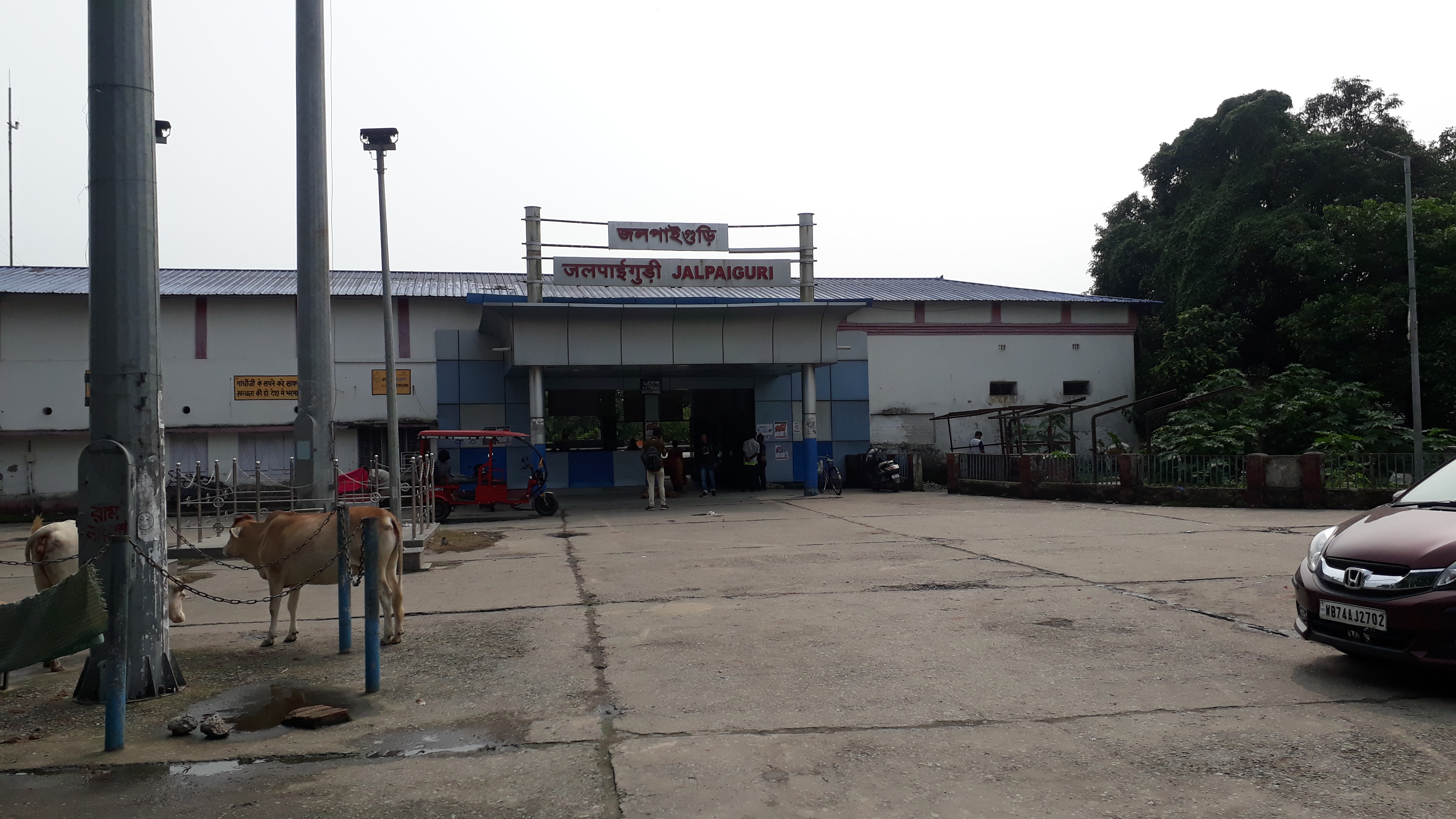
- Old image of JALPAIGURI RAILWAY STATION

General information
- Location: Station Road Ward Number 8 , Jalpaiguri, West Bengal, PIN 735 101; India
- Coordinates: 26.5189°N 88.7237°E
- Elevation: 84 metres (276 ft)
- System: Indian Railways Station
- Owner: Indian Railways
- Operator: Northeast Frontier Railway
- Line: Haldibari–New Jalpaiguri line
- Platforms: 3
- Tracks: 4 Lines . 3 Loop Lines. 1 Main Line.
- Connections: 1. Bus Depots: (A) NBSTC Bus Stand (Depot), Shanti Para, Jalpaiguri. (B) Kadamtala Bus Terminus (Depot), Jalpaiguri. Private Buses services are available here. (C) Bowbazar Bus Stand, Jalpaiguri. (D) Super Bus Stand , near Jalpaiguri Railway Station.: 2. Railway Stations: (A) Jalpaiguri Road Station. (B) Raninagar Jalpaiguri Junction. (C) Mohitnagar. (Mainly for goods train loading as star cement plant is located near of this station)

Construction
- Structure type: Standard on ground
- Parking: Available for Cars, Bikes and E-rickshaw.
- Accessible: Yes

Other information
- Status: Functioning
- Station code: JPG
- Zone(s): NFR
- Division(s): Katihar

History
- Opened: 1878
- Electrified: Yes, 10 January 2024.
- Former names: Bengal Assam Railway

Passengers
- 5K-10K
Location
- Location within India Location within West Bengal

Jalpaiguri railway station serves Jalpaiguri city in Jalpaiguri district in the Indian state of West Bengal. This station is part of the re-development project under Amrit Bharat Station Scheme.

Trains from JALPAIGURI RAILWAY STATION :

• 75709/10 Haldibari New Jalpaiguri DEMU Passenger.

• 75711/12 Haldibari New Jalpaiguri DEMU Passenger.

• 12344/43 Haldibari Sealdah Darjeeling Mail.

•75721/22 Haldibari Siliguri Junction DEMU Passenger

• 12364/63 Haldibari Kolkata Triweekly Intercity Express.

== History ==
During the British period, all connections from southern parts of Bengal to North Bengal were through the eastern part of Bengal. From 1878, the railway route from Kolkata, then called Calcutta, was in two laps. The first lap was a 185 km journey along the Eastern Bengal State Railway from Calcutta Station (later renamed Sealdah) to Damookdeah Ghat on the southern bank of the Padma River, then across the river in a ferry and the second lap of the journey. A 336 km metre-gauge line of the North Bengal Railway linked Saraghat on the northern bank of the Padma to Siliguri via Jalpaiguri.

The 1.8 km-long Hardinge Bridge across the Padma came up in 1912. In 1926 the metre-gauge section north of the bridge was converted to broad gauge, so the entire Calcutta–Siliguri route became broad gauge. The route thus ran: Sealdah–Ranaghat–Bheramara–Hardinge Bridge–Iswardi–Santahar–Hili–Parabtipur–Nilphamari–Haldibari-Jalpaiguri-Siliguri.

With the partition of India, this track got trisected. The through route was formally closed after the India–Pakistan War in 1965.

The Siliguri–Haldibari, part of the original broad gauge Calcutta–Siliguri track via Hardinge Bridge, got delinked from the trunk route in 1947. As all the other tracks in the area were metre gauge, it was converted from broad gauge to metre gauge in the late forties. When New Jalpaiguri railway station came up, the line was extended to New Jalpaiguri. When broad-gauge lines were laid in the area, it was reconverted to broad gauge and now functions as the Haldibari–New Jalpaiguri line.

== Amenities ==
Jalpaiguri railway station has the following amenities: computerized reservation center, waiting rooms, retiring rooms, book stall ,two ATVMs (Automatic Ticket Vending Machines).There are a total of 3 platforms and 4 tracks. The platforms are connected by 2 foot overbridges. These platforms are built to accumulate 24 coaches express train. The platforms are equipped with modern facility like display board of arrival and departure of trains.

Preceding station	Indian Railways	Following station
Kadobari towards ?	Northeast Frontier Railway zone Haldibari–New Jalpaiguri line	Mohitnagar Jalpaiguri towards ?
