= Howrah–Katihar Weekly Express =

Train in India

Overview
- Service type: Express
- First service: 18 February 2014; 12 years ago
- Current operator: Northeast Frontier Railway

Route
- Termini: Howrah (HWH); Katihar (KIR)
- Stops: 9
- Distance travelled: 424 km (263 mi)
- Average journey time: 8 hrs 50 mins
- Service frequency: Weekly
- Train number: 15711 / 15712

On-board services
- Classes: AC 2 Tier, AC 3 Tier, Sleeper Class, General Unreserved (UR)
- Seating arrangements: Yes
- Sleeping arrangements: Yes
- Catering facilities: E-catering only
- Observation facilities: Large windows
- Baggage facilities: Available
- Other facilities: Below the seats

Technical
- Rolling stock: LHB coach
- Track gauge: 1,676 mm (5 ft 6 in)
- Operating speed: 48 km/h (30 mph) average including halts.
Route map
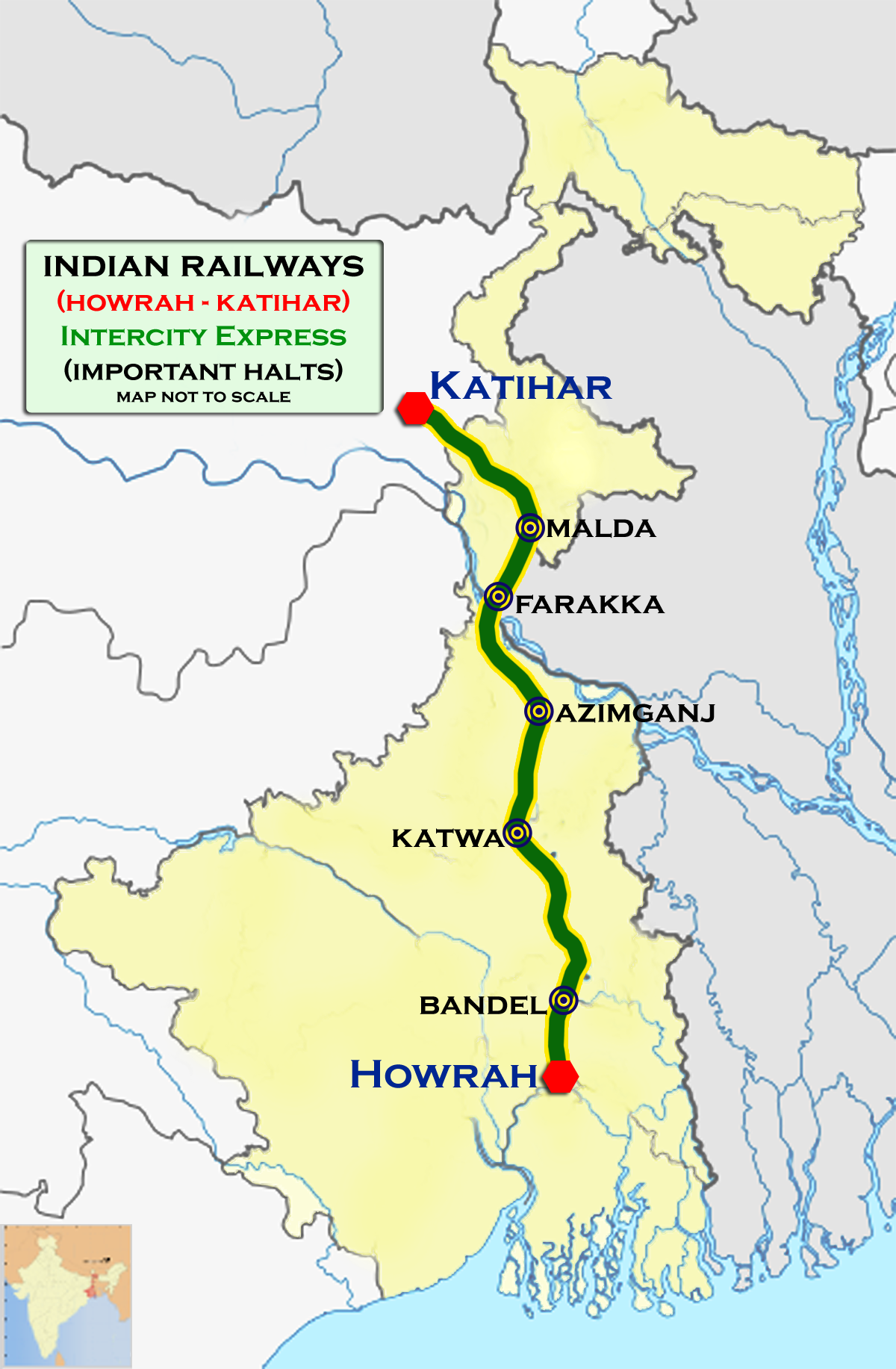

The 15711 / 15712 Howrah–Katihar Weekly Express is an express train belonging to Northeast Frontier Railway zone that runs between Howrah Junction and Katihar Junction in India. It is currently being operated with 15711/15712 train numbers on a four days in a week basis.

== Service ==
The 15711/Howrah–Katihar Weekly Express has an average speed of 48 km/h and covers 424 km in 8h 50m. The 15712/Katihar–Howrah Weekly Express has an average speed of 48 km/h and covers 424 km in 8h 50m.

== Route and halts ==
The important halts of the train are:

- Howrah Junction
- Bandel Junction
- Nabadwip Dham
- Katwa Junction
- Azimganj Junction
- Malda Town
- Samsi
- Harischandrapur
- Kumedpur Junction
- Labha
- Katihar Junction

== Coach composition ==
The train has standard LHB rakes with a max speed of 110 kmph. The train consists of 15 coaches:

- 1 AC II Tier
- 3 AC III Tier
- 5 Sleeper coaches
- 4 General Unreserved
- 1 Second Seating Luggage and Brake Van
- 1 Generator Luggage and Brake Van

== Traction ==
Both trains are hauled by an Electric Loco Shed, Howrah-based WAP-7 electric locomotive from Howrah to Katihar, and vice versa.

== See also ==
- Howrah Junction railway station
- Katihar Junction railway station
