= Harischandrapur railway station =

Railway Station in West Bengal, India

Harischandrapur
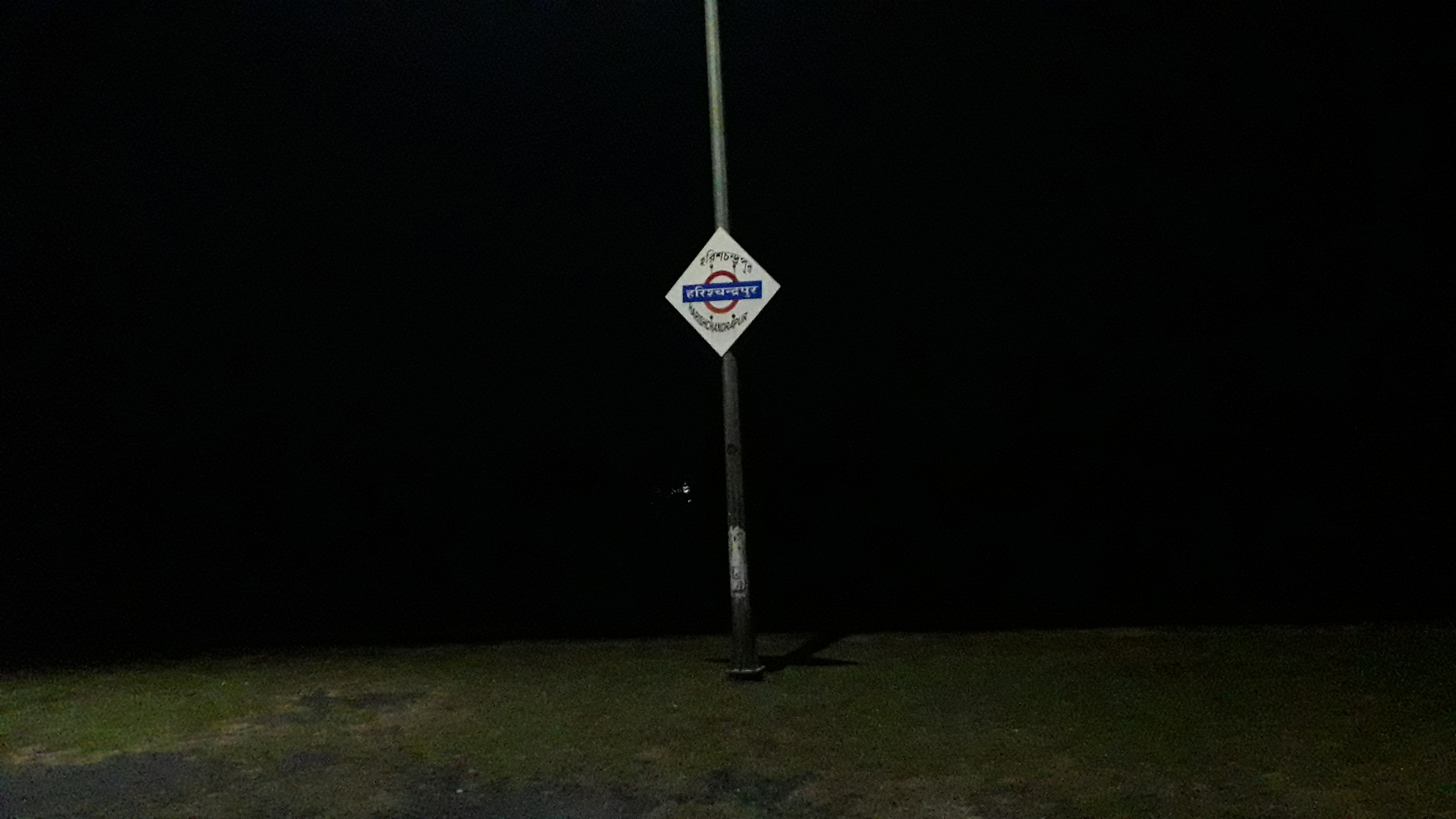
- Platform no. #2/3 in 2021

General information
- Location: National Highway 81, Harishchandrapur, Malda district, West Bengal; India
- Coordinates: 25°24′14″N 87°52′01″E
- Elevation: 31 m (102 ft)
- System: Passenger and Express train station
- Owner: Indian Railways
- Operator: Northeast Frontier Railway
- Line: Howrah–New Jalpaiguri line
- Platforms: 2
- Tracks: 4

Construction
- Structure type: Standard (on ground station)
- Parking: Yes

Other information
- Status: Active
- Station code: HCR
- Zone(s): Northeast Frontier Railway
- Division(s): Katihar

History
- Former names: East Indian Railway Company

Services
Preceding station	Indian Railways	Following station
Kumedpur Junction towards New Jalpaiguri towards ?	Eastern Railway zone Howrah–New Jalpaiguri line	Milangarh towards Howrah towards ?
Location

Harischandrapur railway station is an important railway station on the Howrah–New Jalpaiguri line of Katihar railway division of Northeast Frontier Railway Zone. It is situated beside National Highway 81 at Harischandrapur of Malda district in the Indian state of West Bengal. Toatal 34 trains including number of express trains stop at Harischandrapur railway station. This station serves Harishchandrapur I and Harishchandrapur II Community Development Block.

== Trains ==
Major Trains available from this railway station are as follows:

- Chennai–New Jalpaiguri Superfast Express
- Sealdah-Alipurduar Kanchan Kanya Express
- Dibrugarh-Howrah Kamrup Express via Guwahati
- Dibrugarh–Howrah Kamrup Express Via Rangapara North
- Sealdah-New Alipurdiar Teesta Torsha Express
- New Jalpaiguri -Malda Town Express
- Kolkata–Radhikapur Express
- Howrah Katihar Express
- Sealdah Saharsha Hate Bazare Express
- Kolkata–Jogbani Express
- Kolkata–Haldibari Intercity Express
- Siliguri Junction-Balurghat Express
