= Chilahati railway station =

Railway station in Bangladesh

Chilahati চিলাহাটি
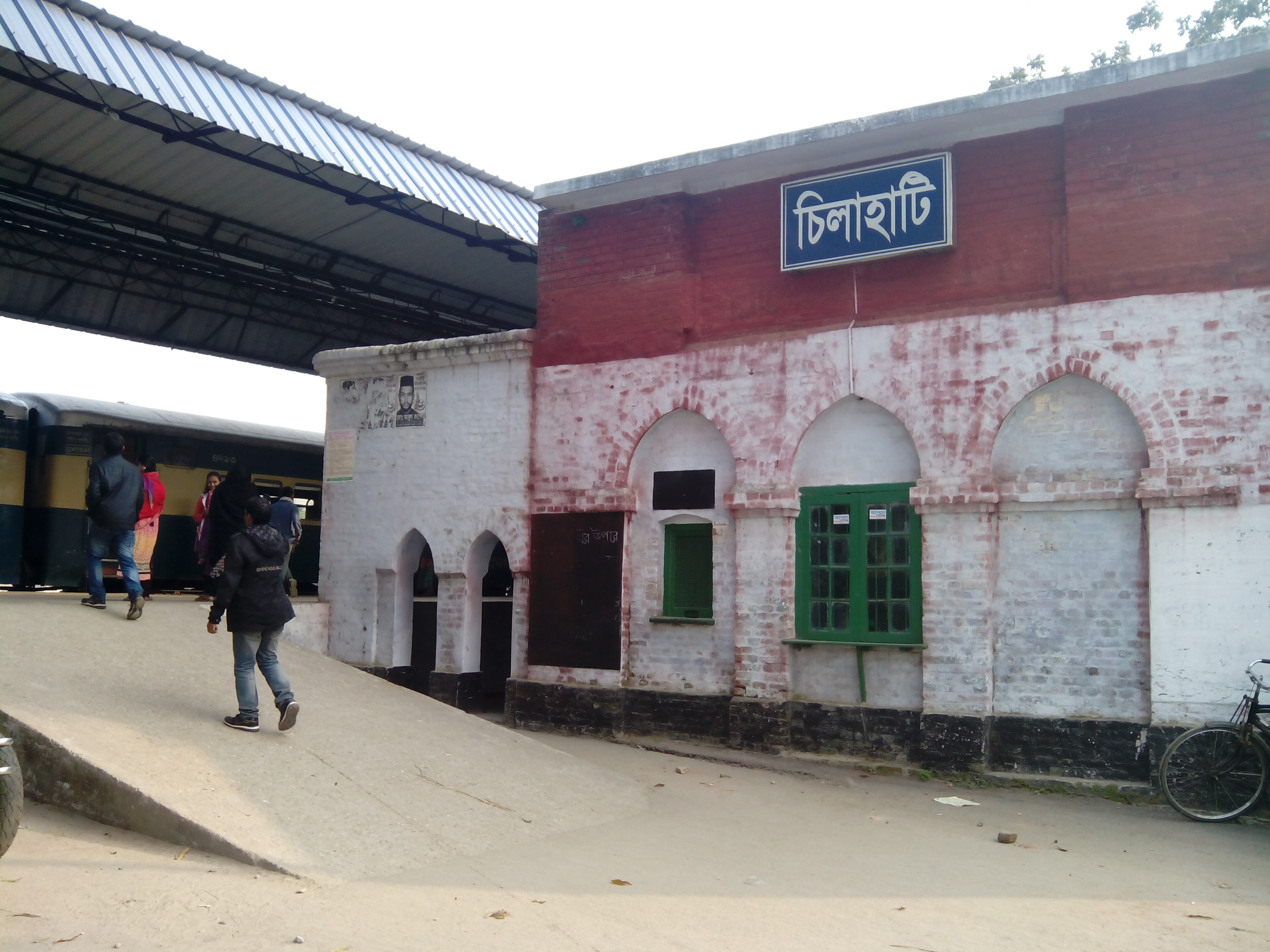

General information
- Location: Chilahati, Nilphamari District, Rangpur; Bangladesh
- Coordinates: 26°14′38″N 88°47′48″E
- Elevation: 48 m (157 ft)
- System: Bangladesh Railway Station
- Line: Chilahati-Parbatipur-Santahar-Darshana line

Construction
- Structure type: Standard (on ground station)

Other information
- Status: Functioning

History
- Opened: 1878
- Former names: Eastern Bengal Railway

Services
Preceding station	Bangladesh Railway	Following station
Terminus	Chilahati–Parbatipur–Santahar–Darshana	Miraganj towards Darshana
Route map
Location

Chilahati railway station (Bengali: চিলাহাটি রেলওয়ে স্টেশন) is a border railway station in Bangladesh, situated in Nilphamari District, in Rangpur Division. It is an active railway transit point on the Bangladesh-India border.

== Important track in the British period ==
During the British period all connections from southern parts of Bengal to North Bengal were through the eastern part of Bengal. From 1878, the railway route from Kolkata, then called Calcutta, was in two laps. The first lap was a 185 km journey along the Eastern Bengal State Railway from Calcutta Station (later renamed Sealdah) to Damookdeah Ghat on the southern bank of the Padma River, then across the river in a ferry and the second lap of the journey. A 336 km metre gauge line of the North Bengal Railway linked Saraghat on the northern bank of the Padma to Siliguri.

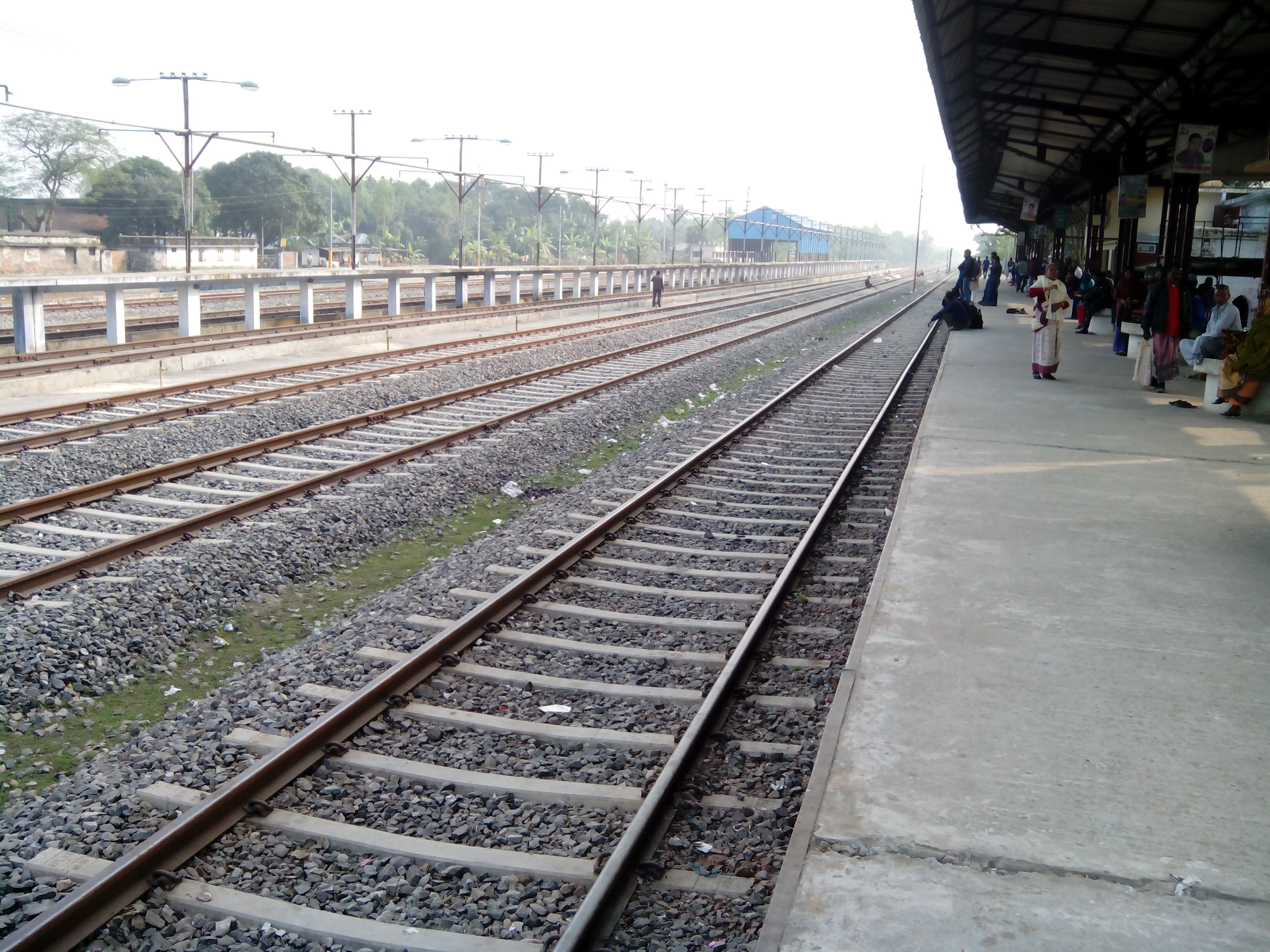
Chilahati railway station platform

The 1.8 km long Hardinge Bridge across the Padma came up in 1912. In 1926 the metre-gauge section north of the bridge was converted to broad gauge, and so the entire Calcutta - Siliguri route became broad-gauge. The route thus ran: Sealdah-Ranaghat-Bheramara-Hardinge Bridge-Iswardi-Santahar-Hili-Parabtipur-Nilphamari-Haldibari-Jalpaiguri-Siliguri.

With the partition of India, this track got trisected. The through route was formally closed after the India-Pakistan War in 1965.

== Haldibari-Chilahati ==
There were proposals to return the Haldibari-Chilahati section to working condition. Bangladesh Railway had to construct 7.5 kilometres of new rail tracks from Chilahati to reach the border while the Indian authorities had to set up 4.5 kilometres of tracks from its border to Haldibari railway station.

In the Joint Statement issued on the occasion of the visit of the Prime Minister of India to Bangladesh, on 7 September 2011, it was stated: "Bangladesh Prime Minister expressed her appreciation to the Indian Prime Minister for amendment of the MoU between the Bangladesh and Indian Railways allowing Rohanpur-Singabad as an additional route for both bulk and container cargo for Nepalese rail transit traffic. Bangladesh side also appreciated the assistance from India for the movement of fertilizers from Bangladesh to Nepal by rail route. They also agreed to re-establish rail connections between Chilahati-Haldibari and Kulaura-Mahishashan in the spirit of encouraging revival of old linkages and transport routes between the two countries."

The Haldibari-Chilahati link was relaunched on 1 August 2021.

== Saidpur-Chilahati railway line ==
As of 2010, the 64 kilometres (40 mi) long Saidpur-Chilahati line was in such a bad shape that there was no fast train between Dhaka and Chilahati. In 2010, Taka 103.68 crore was sanctioned for the development of this line.
