= Raninagar Jalpaiguri Junction railway station =

Railway station in West Bengal, India

Raninagar Jalpaiguri Junction
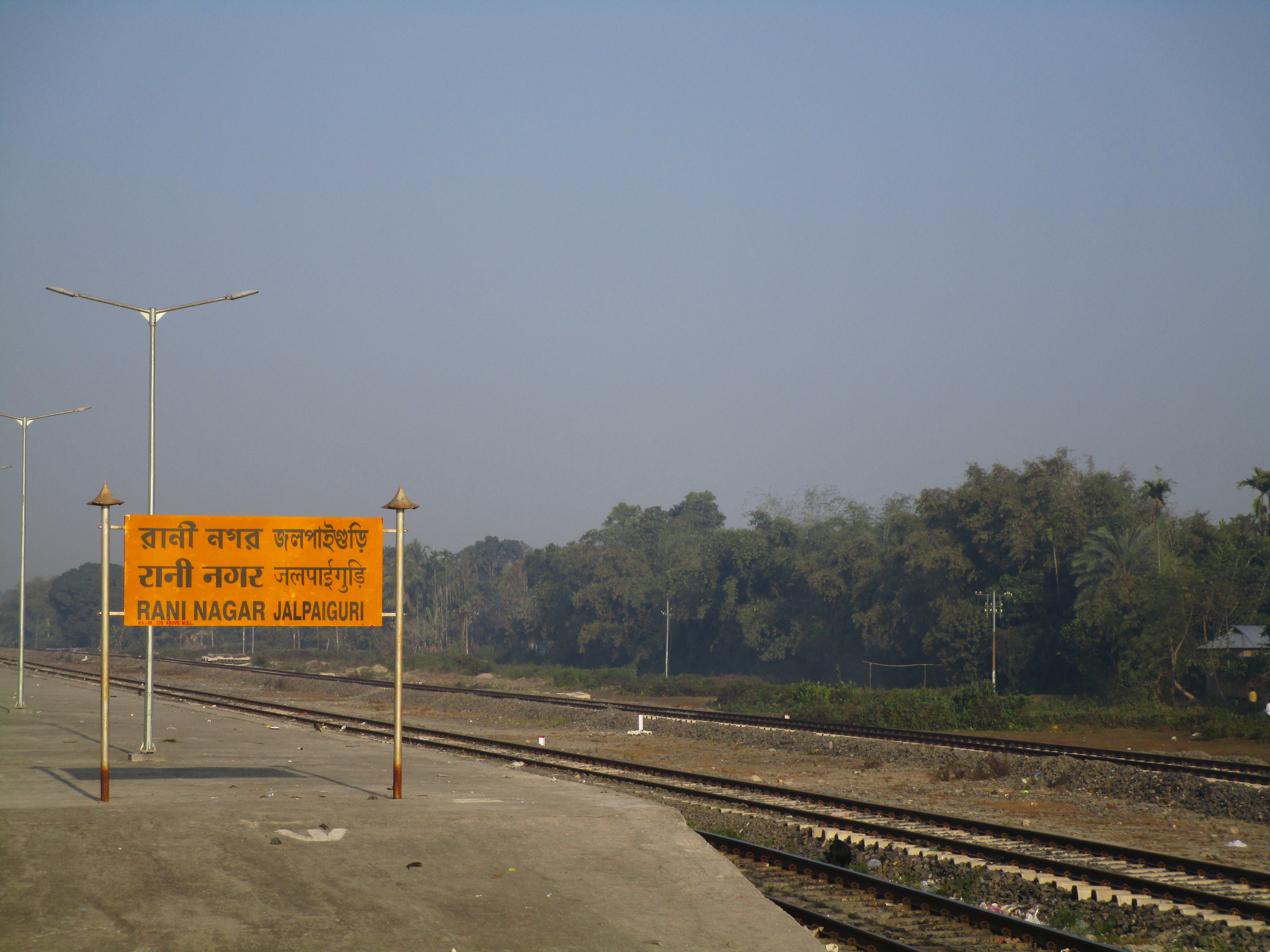
- Raninagar Station Nameplate, Jalpaiguri

General information
- Location: Jalpaiguri City Highway (State highway 12(A)), Raninagar, Jalpaiguri, West Bengal; India
- Coordinates: 26.544°N 88.648°E
- Elevation: 91 metres (299 ft)
- System: Indian Railways junction station
- Owner: Indian Railways
- Operator: Northeast Frontier Railway zone
- Lines: Barauni–Guwahati line Haldibari–New Jalpaiguri line
- Platforms: 2
- Tracks: 6

Construction
- Parking: Available
- Cycle facilities: Available

Other information
- Status: Active
- Station code: RQJ
Location
- Location within West Bengal Location within India

Raninagar Jalpaiguri Junction (Code: RQJ) is a railway station and railway junction in Raninagar, which is the Industrial Town in Jalpaiguri district, West Bengal, India. It serves the Indian city of Jalpaiguri. The station code is RQJ. It has two platforms.

It lies in the New Jalpaiguri–New Bongaigaon section under Katihar division of the Northeast Frontier Railway zone.

Branch line to Haldibari begins here.

== Trains ==
Halting Trains - 10

6 Passenger Trains and 2 Local Trains and 2 Express trains stop at this station .

55749/50 New Jalpaiguri Haldibari Passenger.

55750/51 Haldibari New Jalpaiguri Passenger

75721/22 Haldibari Siliguri Junction DEMU Passenger.

15703/04 New Jalpaiguri - Bongaigaon Intercity Express

13141/42 Teesta Torsa Express
