= Mohitnagar railway station =

Railway station in West Bengal

General information
- Location: Mohitnagar, Jalpaiguri district, West Bengal; India
- Coordinates: 26.5306°N 88.6676°E
- Elevation: 90 m (295 ft)
- System: Indian Railways station
- Owner: Indian Railways
- Line: Haldibari–New Jalpaiguri line
- Platforms: 1 BG
- Tracks: 1 BG
- Connections: Taxi stand, auto stand

Construction
- Structure type: Standard (on ground station)
- Parking: Available
- Cycle facilities: Available
- Accessible: Disabled access

Other information
- Status: Active
- Station code: MOP
- Fare zone: Northeast Frontier Railway

History
- Former names: Bengal Assam Railway

Services
Preceding station	Indian Railways	Following station
Jalpaiguri towards ?	Northeast Frontier Railway zone Haldibari–New Jalpaiguri line	Raninagar Jalpaiguri towards ?
Location
- Location within West Bengal Location within India

Mohitnagar railway station is a small railway station in Jalpaiguri district, West Bengal. Its code is MOP. The station consists of 1 platform, which is not well sheltered and lacks many facilities, including water and sanitation.
