= Haldibari railway station =

Railway station in Cooch Behar district, India

Haldibari

General information
- Location: Haldibari, Cooch Behar, West Bengal, PIN 735122; India
- Coordinates: 26.3360°N 88.7828°E
- Elevation: 76 metres (249 ft)
- System: Indian Railways station
- Owner: Indian Railways
- Operator: Northeast Frontier Railway Zone
- Line: Haldibari–New Jalpaiguri line
- Platforms: 3
- Tracks: 5 With 2 Sidings Line

Construction
- Structure type: At grade
- Parking: Available

Other information
- Status: Functioning
- Station code: HDB
- Zone(s): NFR
- Division(s): Katihar

History
- Opened: 1878
- Rebuilt: 2021
- Former names: Bengal Assam Railway
Location
- Location within West Bengal Location within India

Haldibari Railway Station serves Haldibari town in Cooch Behar district of the Indian state of West Bengal. It is the Oldest Railway Station In North Bengal as well as North-East India. Moreover It is an active railway transit point on the Bangladesh–India border. This is a terminating and as well as originating station.

MAJOR TRAINS :

• 55749/50 New Jalpaiguri-Haldibari Passenger.

• 55751/52 Haldibari-New Jalpaiguri Passenger.

• 12344/43 Haldibari-Sealdah Superfast Darjeeling Mail.

•75722/21 Haldibari-Siliguri Junction DEMU Passenger.

• 12364/63 Haldibari - Kolkata Triweekly Intercity Superfast Express.

• 15463/64 Haldibari - Balurghat Intercity Express.

• 15467/68 Haldibari - Bamanhat Intercity Express

== History ==
During the British period all connections from southern parts of Bengal to North Bengal were through the eastern part of Bengal. From 1878, the railway route from Kolkata, then called Calcutta, was in two laps. The first lap was a 185 km journey along the Eastern Bengal State Railway from Calcutta Station (later renamed Sealdah) to Damookdeah Ghat on the southern bank of the Padma River, then across the river in a ferry and the second lap of the journey. A 336 km metre-gauge line of the North Bengal Railway linked Saraghat on the northern bank of the Padma to Siliguri.

The 1.8 km long Hardinge Bridge across the Padma came up in 1912. In 1926 the metre-gauge section north of the bridge was converted to broad gauge, and so the entire Calcutta – Siliguri route became broad-gauge. The route thus ran: Sealdah–Ranaghat–Bheramara–Hardinge Bridge–Iswardi–Santahar–Hili–Parabtipur–Nilphamari-Haldibari-Jalpaiguri–Siliguri.

With the partition of India, this track got trisected. The through route was formally closed after the India–Pakistan War in 1965.

The Siliguri–Haldibari, part of the original broad gauge Calcutta–Siliguri track via Hardinge Bridge, got delinked from the trunk route in 1947. As all the other tracks in the area were metre gauge, it was converted from broad gauge to metre gauge in the late forties. When New Jalpaiguri railway station came up, the line was extended to New Jalpaiguri. When broad-gauge lines were laid in the area, it was reconverted to broad gauge and now functions as the Haldibari–New Jalpaiguri line.

== Haldibari–Chilahati ==
There were proposals to reoperationalise the Haldibari–Chilahati section. Bangladesh Railway had to construct 7.5 kilometres of new rail tracks from Chilahati to reach the border while the Indian authorities had to set up 4.5 kilometres of tracks from its border to Haldibari railway station.

In the joint statement issued on the occasion of the visit of the Prime Minister of India to Bangladesh, on 7 September 2011, it was stated: "Bangladesh Prime Minister expressed her appreciation to the Indian Prime Minister for amendment of the MoU between the Bangladesh and Indian Railways allowing Rohanpur-Singabad as an additional route for both bulk and container cargo for Nepalese rail transit traffic. Bangladesh side also appreciated the assistance from India for the movement of fertilizers from Bangladesh to Nepal by rail route. They also agreed to re-establish rail connections between Chilahati–Haldibari and Kulaura–Mahishashan in the spirit of encouraging revival of old linkages and transport routes between the two countries."

The Haldibari-Chilahati link was relaunched with freight operations on 1 August 2021.

Preceding station	Indian Railways	Following station
Kashiabari towards ?	Northeast Frontier Railway zone Haldibari–New Jalpaiguri line	Terminus
