= Haldibari, India =

Haldibari
- City
- Location in West Bengal, India Haldibari (India) Haldibari (Asia)
- Coordinates: 26.33°N 88.77°E
- Country: India
- State: West Bengal
- District: Cooch Behar

Government
  - Type: Municipality
  - Body: Haldibari Municipality

Area
  - Total: 10 km^{2} (3.9 sq mi)
- Elevation: 57 m (187 ft)

Population (2021)
  - Total: 128,922
  - Density: 13,000/km^{2} (33,000/sq mi)

Languages
  - Official: Bengali
  - Additional official: English
- Time zone: UTC+5:30 (IST)
- PIN: 735122
- Telephone code: 03561
- ISO 3166 code: IN-WB
- Vehicle registration: 71, 72
- Lok Sabha constituency: Jalpaiguri
- Vidhan Sabha constituency: Mekhliganj
- Website: www.haldibarimunicipality.org

Haldibari (Bengali pronunciation: [ɦoldibaɽi]) is a city and a municipality in the Mekhliganj subdivision of the Cooch Behar district in the Indian state of West Bengal.

== Geography ==
Places in the Mathabhanga, Mekhliganj subdivisions and Sitai CD block of Dinhata subdivision in Cooch Behar district
CT: census town, R: rural/ urban centre, M: Municipal town
Owing to space constraints in the small map, the actual locations in a larger map may vary slightly

=== Location ===
Haldibari is located at 26.33°N 88.77°E. It has an average elevation of 57 metres (187 feet). Haldibari is a town located near India-Bangladesh border.

According to the District Census Handbook 2011, Cooch Bihar, Haldbari covered an area of 10.5 km^{2}.

=== Area overview ===
The map alongside shows the western part of the district. In Mekhliganj subdivision 9.91% of the population lives in the urban areas and 90.09% lives in the rural areas. In Mathabhanga subdivision 3.67% of the population, the lowest in the district, lives in the urban areas and 96.35% lives in the rural areas. The entire district forms the flat alluvial flood plains of mighty rivers. Note: The map alongside presents some of the notable locations in the subdivisions. All places marked in the map are linked in the larger full screen map.

== Climate ==
Like other places of eastern India Haldibari experiences three seasons, namely Summer, Monsoons and Winter. The town experiences heavy amount of rainfall during the Monsoon. In the summer the temperature reaches around 35 degrees of Celsius and in extreme winter the temperature sometimes falls down to 5 degrees of Celsius.

== Demographics ==
As per 2011 Census of India Haldibari had a total population of 14,404 of which 7,306 (51%) were males and 7,098 (49%) were females. Population in the age range 0–6 years was 1,341. The total number of literate persons in Haldibari was 10,968 (76.1%), with male literacy of 79.2% and female literacy of 73.0%. The effective literacy rate of population aged 7 years and above 84.0%, of which male literacy rate was 87.6% and female literacy rate was 80.3%. The Scheduled Castes and Scheduled Tribes population was 5,109 and 135 respectively. Haldibari had 3405 households in 2011.

As of 2001 India census, Haldibari had a population of 13,170. Males constitute 51% of the population and females 49%. Haldibari has an average literacy rate of 67%, higher than the national average of 59.5%: male literacy is 72%, and female literacy is 62%. In Haldibari, 12% of the population is under 6 years of age.

== Civic administration ==
Administration of the Haldibari Municipality is headed by a chairman who is elected by the residents of the town. It has 11 wards from where the councilors are elected. The newly elected chairman is Sri Shankar Kumar Das and Vice chairman is Sri Amitava Biswas.

=== Police station ===
Haldibari police station has jurisdiction over Haldibari municipal area and Haldibari CD block.

=== CD block HQ ===
The headquarters of the Haldibari CD block are located at Haldibari town.

== Transport ==
Haldibari railway station is on the Haldibari-New Jalpaiguri line It also connects India with Chilahati in Bangladesh. Haldibari has a NBSTC depot located at the Purbopara area of Haldibari which offers bus services around all parts of North Bengal.

== Education ==
Netaji Subhas Mahavidyalaya was established in 1985. Affiliated with the Cooch Behar Panchanan Barma University, it offers honours courses in Bengali, English, history, political science and geography, and a general course in arts.

== Healthcare ==
Haldibari Rural Hospital, with 30 beds at Haldibari, is the major government medical facility in the Haldibari CD block.

== See also ==
- Haldibari High School

Boxiganj Abdul Kader Sarkar High School
