= Bhaluka Road railway station =

Railway station in West Bengal

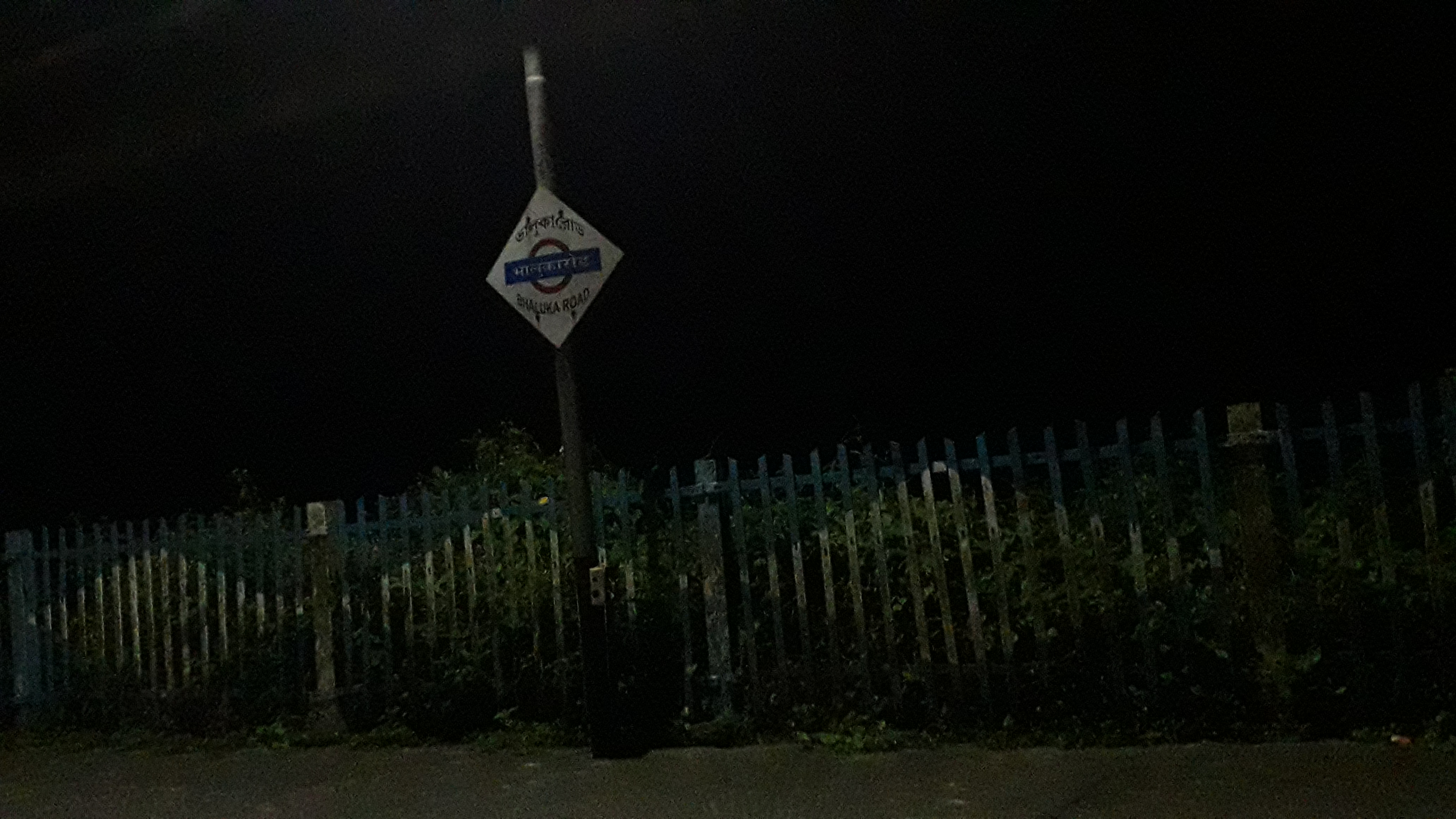
- Platform #2 in 2021

General information
- Location: Kariali, Bhaluka Road, Malda district, West Bengal; India
- Coordinates: 25°20′33″N 87°54′44″E
- Elevation: 31 m (102 ft)
- System: Passenger train, Express train station
- Owner: Indian Railways
- Operator: Northeast Frontier Railway
- Line: Howrah–New Jalpaiguri line
- Platforms: 2
- Tracks: 2

Construction
- Structure type: Standard (on ground station)
- Parking: No

Other information
- Status: Active
- Station code: BKRD
- Zone(s): Northeast Frontier Railway
- Division(s): Katihar

History
- Former names: East Indian Railway Company

Services
Preceding station	Indian Railways	Following station
Milangarh towards ?	Eastern Railway zone Howrah–New Jalpaiguri line	Malahar Halt towards ?
Location

Bhaluka Road railway station is a railway station on the Howrah–New Jalpaiguri line of Katihar railway division of Northeast Frontier Railway Zone. It is situated at Kariali of Malda district in the Indian state of West Bengal. Total 24 passengers and express trains stop at Bhaluka Road railway station.
