= Raninagar, Jalpaiguri =

Raninagar
- Town
- Location in West Bengal, India Raninagar (India)
- Coordinates: 26.54°N 88.64°E
- Country: India
- State: West Bengal
- District: Jalpaiguri

Languages
  - Official: Bengali, English
- Time zone: UTC+5:30 (IST)
- PIN: 735133
- Nearest City: Jalpaiguri, Siliguri
- Website: https://jalpaiguri.gov.in/

Raninagar is an industrial town in the suburb of Jalpaiguri of the Jalpaiguri district in the state of West Bengal, India.

== Education ==
- Jalpaiguri Institute of Technology, was established in 2015. This college approved by AICTE and affiliated by West Bengal State Council of Technical and Vocational Education and Skill Development. This college offers Diploma in Engineering & Technology courses(10+3) in Civil Engineering, Computer Science & Technology, Mechanical Engineering and Electrical Engineering with 60 intake capacity of each stream.
- Kendriya Vidyalaya BSF Raninagar, was established in 2010. Under the CBSE Board.
