= Jalpaiguri =

City in West Bengal, India

- City
- Location in West Bengal, India Jalpaiguri (India)
- Coordinates: 26.52°N 88.73°E
- Country: India
- State: West Bengal
- District: Jalpaiguri
- Founded: 1869
- Founder: British India

Government
  - Type: Municipality
  - Body: Jalpaiguri Municipality; Siliguri Jalpaiguri Development Authority; Jalpaiguri Zilla Parishad
  - Chairman of Jalpaiguri Municipality: Saikat Chatterjee
  - Chairman of SJDA: Preeti Goyal
  - Sabhadhipati of Jalpaiguri Zilla Parishad: Krishna Roy Barman
  - District Magistrate: Aditi Chaudhary, IAS
  - Superintendent of police: Sujata Kumari Veenapani, IPS

Area
  - City: 12.95 km^{2} (5.00 sq mi)
- Elevation: 89 m (292 ft)

Population (2011)
  - City: 107,341
  - Rank: 19th in West Bengal
  - Density: 8,289/km^{2} (21,470/sq mi)
  - Metro: 169,002
- Demonym(s): Jalpaigurians, Jalpaiguribashi

Languages
  - Official: Bengali
  - Additional official: English
- Time zone: UTC+5:30 (IST)
- PIN: 735101 - 735 110 (city limits), 735120 - 735134 (suburbs)
- Telephone code: +913561
- Vehicle registration: WB - 71, WB - 72
- Lok Sabha constituency: Jalpaiguri
- Vidhan Sabha constituency: Jalpaiguri, Rajganj, Maynaguri, Mal, Dabgram-Fulbari, Dhupguri, Nagrakata
- Per Capita Income: ₹193,726 (US$2,100) ▲ (2024-25)
- Precipitation: 3,395 mm (134 in)
- Avg. annual temperature: 24.8 °C (77 °F)
- Website: jalpaigurimunicipality.org jalpaiguri.gov.in jalpaigurizp.in
- ^{1}The coordinates given here are in metric system and based upon the Microsoft Encarta Reference Library Map Center 2005 ^{2} The Vehicle Code given here based upon the Jalpaiguri District Court documentations.

Jalpaiguri (Bengali pronunciation: [d͡ʒɔlpai̯guɽi]) is a city in the Indian state of West Bengal. It is the headquarter of the Jalpaiguri district and the Jalpaiguri division, covering the five districts of North Bengal. The city is located on the banks of the Teesta River and Karala River, on the foothills of the Himalayas. The city is home to the circuit bench of the Calcutta High Court, the other seat being at Port Blair in the Andaman and Nicobar Islands. Jalpaiguri features the Jalpaiguri Government Engineering College, the second campus of the University of North Bengal and the Biswa Bangla Krirangan/ Jalpaiguri Sports Village. It lies about 35 km (22 mi) south of its twin city Siliguri. The merging of the two cities makes it the largest metropolis of the region.

== Etymology ==
The name "Jalpaiguri" comes from the Bengali words "Jalpai" meaning Ceylon olive, which grew in the city and adjacent areas, and "Guri" meaning a place.

== Geography ==
Jalpaiguri is the district headquarter of Jalpaiguri District. It is situated at a height of 89m(292 ft) from Mean Sea Level. The city lies very close to the Himalayas and on the left bank of Teesta river. The Karla river is another major river of Jalpaiguri which flows through the city.

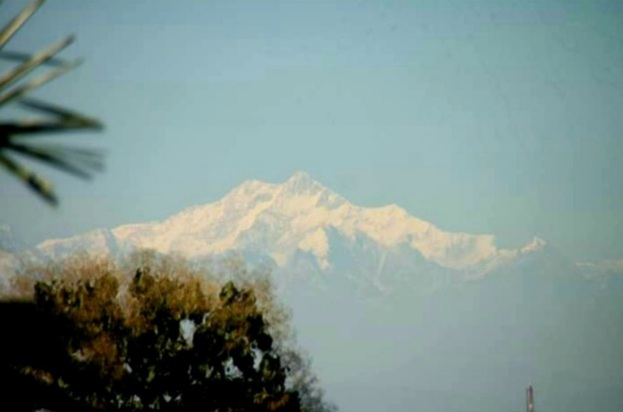
Mount Kanchenjunga as viewed from Jalpaiguri in October 2020

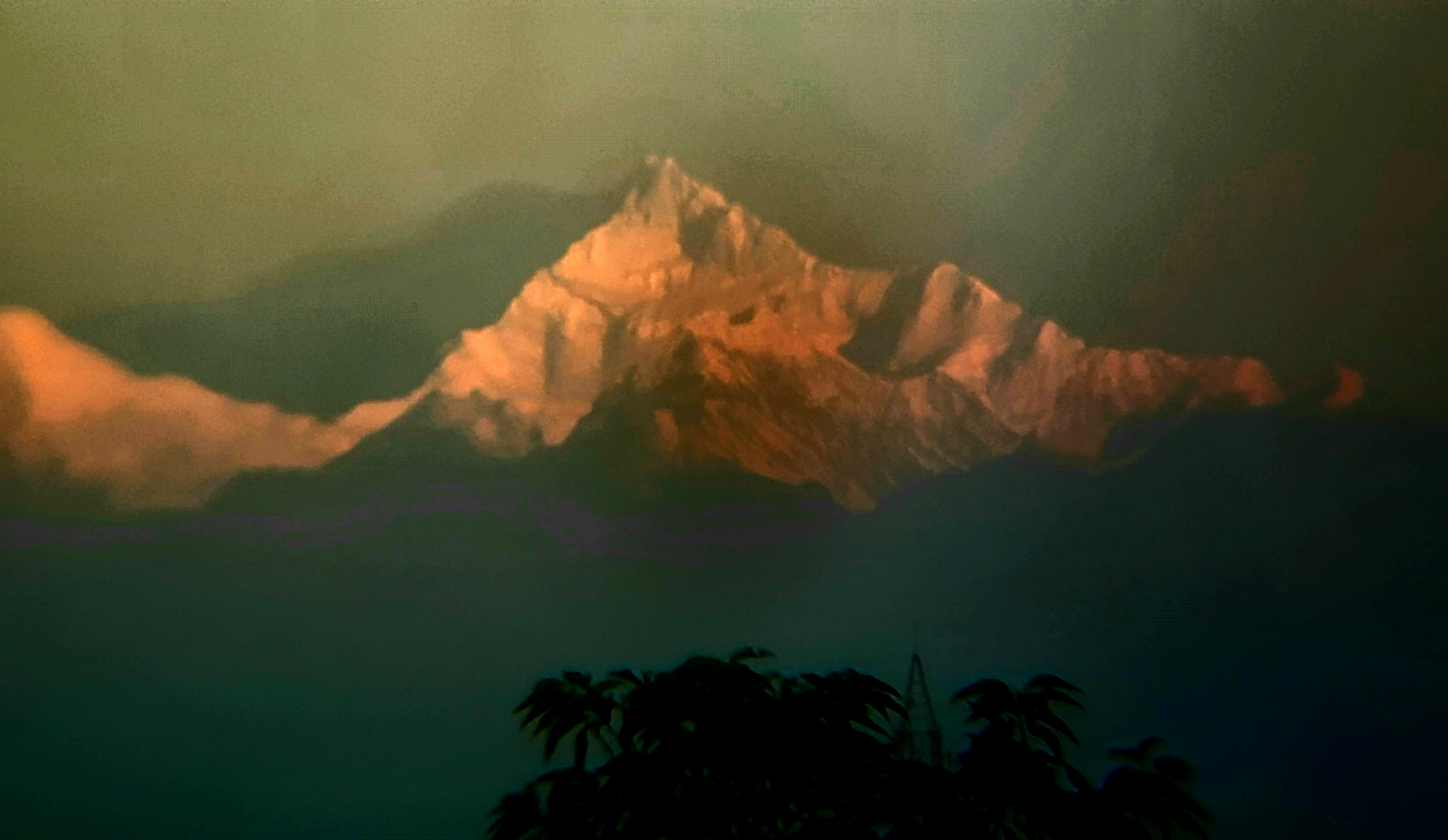
Kangchenjunga from Jalpaiguri at sunrise (November 2022)

=== Climate ===
==== Temperature ====
The annual average temperature of Jalpaiguri city is 24.8 °C. In summer, the temperature varies from a minimum of 20–22 °C to a maximum of 30–35 °C. August is the hottest month with an average temperature of 29.2 °C. The temperature in peak summer sometimes exceeds 37 °C. The highest temperature ever recorded in Jalpaiguri was 40.9 °C, recorded on 21 July 1986. The winter maximum temperature here hovers around 22–25 °C and minimum drops to 8–10 °C. The minimum temperature sometimes falls below 7 °C. The lowest temperature ever dropped in Jalpaiguri city was 2.2 °C, recorded on 5 February 1914.

==== Rainfall and other conditions ====
As Jalpaiguri is located on the base of the Himalayas, the city receives a high amount of rainfall throughout the year. The average annual rainfall is approximately 3400 mm. A distinct season, monsoon is observed from June to September. About 917.3 mm rain falls in July. Though the amount plummets to 3.3 mm in December. On an average, the rainy days in Jalpaiguri city are 100. The heaviest one-day rainfall occurred on 10 July 1999 when 474 mm rain fell on the city. The wettest month was July 1996. In that month, a total of 1546.2 mm of rain was received. Jalpaiguri doesn't get snowfall. Humidity is very high in the air.

Climate data for Jalpaiguri (1991–2020, extremes 1901–present)
Month	Jan	Feb	Mar	Apr	May	Jun	Jul	Aug	Sep	Oct	Nov	Dec	Year
Record high °C (°F)	31.0 (87.8)	32.9 (91.2)	37.4 (99.3)	40.0 (104.0)	40.4 (104.7)	39.4 (102.9)	40.9 (105.6)	38.4 (101.1)	38.8 (101.8)	38.4 (101.1)	35.1 (95.2)	33.5 (92.3)	40.9 (105.6)
Mean daily maximum °C (°F)	23.5 (74.3)	26.5 (79.7)	30.1 (86.2)	31.8 (89.2)	32.2 (90.0)	32.3 (90.1)	32.1 (89.8)	32.8 (91.0)	32.0 (89.6)	31.5 (88.7)	29.4 (84.9)	26.0 (78.8)	30.1 (86.2)
Mean daily minimum °C (°F)	10.7 (51.3)	13.4 (56.1)	17.3 (63.1)	21.1 (70.0)	23.3 (73.9)	25.0 (77.0)	25.5 (77.9)	25.6 (78.1)	24.7 (76.5)	21.8 (71.2)	17.0 (62.6)	12.8 (55.0)	20.0 (68.0)
Record low °C (°F)	3.8 (38.8)	2.2 (36.0)	7.8 (46.0)	10.3 (50.5)	11.5 (52.7)	15.5 (59.9)	18.1 (64.6)	18.1 (64.6)	17.7 (63.9)	15.4 (59.7)	9.4 (48.9)	5.6 (42.1)	2.2 (36.0)
Average rainfall mm (inches)	9.0 (0.35)	16.1 (0.63)	35.2 (1.39)	118.7 (4.67)	332.2 (13.08)	628.4 (24.74)	917.3 (36.11)	624.1 (24.57)	511.1 (20.12)	154.1 (6.07)	7.1 (0.28)	3.3 (0.13)	3,356.9 (132.16)
Average rainy days	0.8	1.1	2.3	6.9	12.5	17.4	21.2	17.5	14.3	5.4	0.7	0.3	100.3
Average relative humidity (%) (at 17:30 IST)	77	68	62	69	74	80	82	82	83	80	75	77	76
Source: India Meteorological Department

== Demographics ==
Languages of Jalpaiguri (2011 census)
1. Bengali (83.3%)
2. Hindi (14.1%)
3. Nepali (2.13%)
4. Others (0.54%)

According to the 2011 census, Jalpaiguri had a population of 107,341 people (53,708 male and 53,633 female) while the Metropolitan region had a population of 169,002 people (85,226 males and 83,787 females). The population for children aged 0–6 was 14,522. Effective literacy rate for people aged 7+ was 86.43 per cent. The main languages spoken here are Bengali, Hindi and Nepali.

Religions in Jalpaiguri
Religion	Percent
Hinduism	88.16%
Islam	9.64%
Christianity	0.97%
Buddhism	0.54%
Others	1.20%
Distribution of religions. Others include Sikhs (0.47%) and Jains (0.22%)

== Civic administration ==
Civic administration is the responsibility of the Jalpaiguri Municipality which is the tenth oldest in West Bengal after that of Kolkata, Uttarpara, Shantipur, Howrah, Krishnanagar, Burdwan, Basirhat, Berhampore and Siuri. Set up in 1885, it is headed by a chairman who is elected by the residents of the city. It has 25 wards that elect the ward councillors. The All India Trinamool Congress is in the power of this municipal body. The chairperson of the municipality is Papia Pal.

== Economy ==
Jalpaiguri has its own bank, the Jalpaiguri Central Co-operative Bank, whose head office is located at Temple Street of the city. Founded in 1919, it has more than 20 branches with ATMs spread across the District.

== Utility services ==
The municipality is responsible for providing basic services, such as potable water and sanitation. The water is supplied by the municipal authorities using its groundwater resources, and almost all the houses in the municipal area are connected through the system.

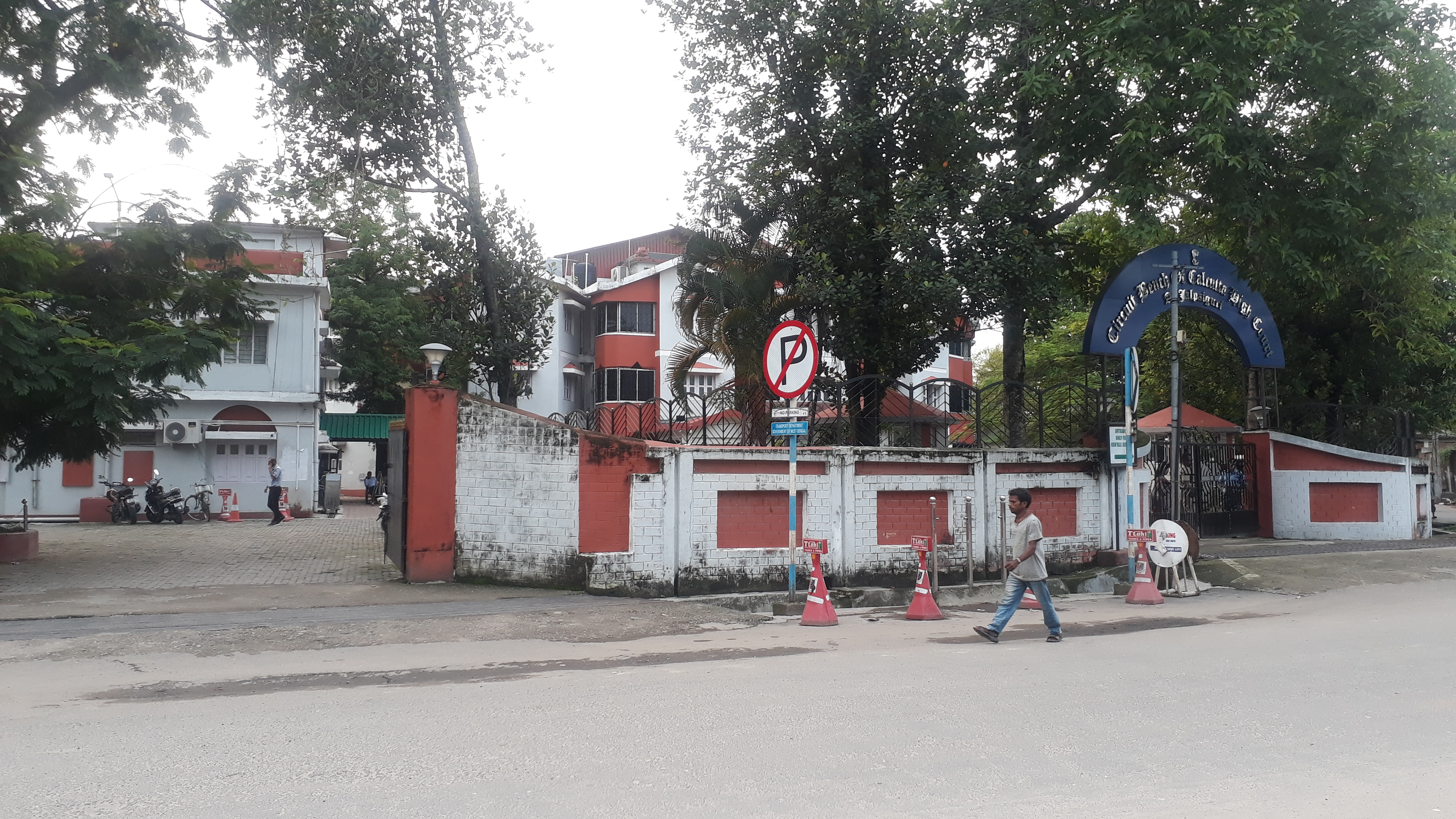
Calcutta High Court Circuit Bench in Jalpaiguri

== Tourism ==
There is one national park and one wildlife sanctuary in Jalpaiguri.

- Gorumara National Park
- Chapramari Wildlife Sanctuary

== Transport ==
=== Rail ===
Jalpaiguri city region has four important railway stations:-

1. Jalpaiguri Town is the oldest station in the area.
2. Jalpaiguri Road was opened in 1944 and is the primarily crucial railway station of the city.
3. Mohitnagar lies at Mohitnagar in the Haldibari-New Jalpaiguri line.
4. Raninagar Jalpaiguri Junction is situated at the further western part of the city. The railway station serves Jalpaiguri, Raninagar and other nearby places.

=== Road ===
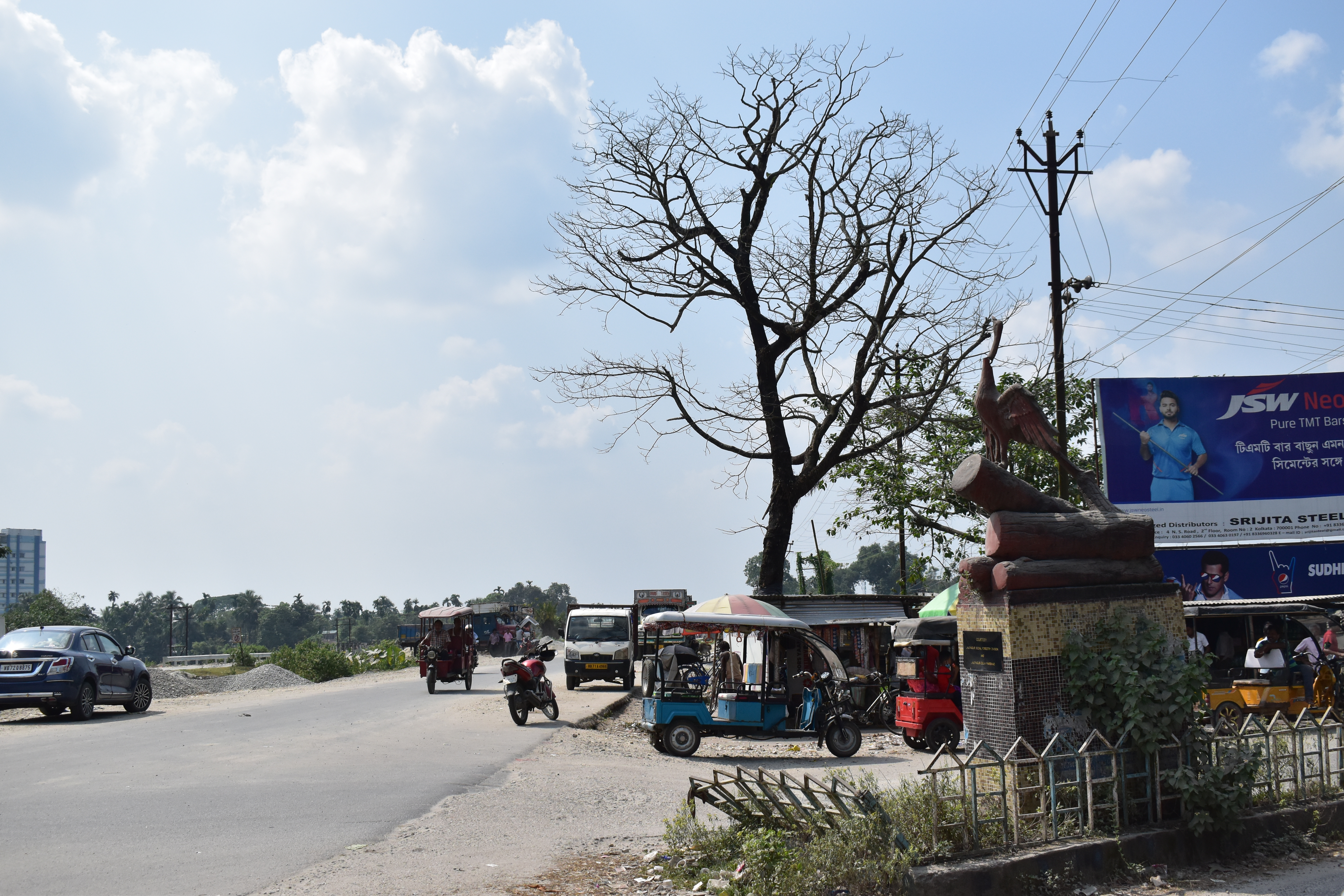
Goshala More, Highway connector of Jalpaiguri

The Asian Highway 2 and the National Highway 31D [NH 27 (New Numbering)] passes just through the city connecting it right with the rest of the country.

The Netaji Subhash Chandra Bose Central Bus Terminus situated next to the North Bengal State Transport Corporation (NBSTC) Bus Terminal is a major stop for most private and state-owned buses in the region. The Royal Government of Bhutan also operates buses from Jalpaiguri to its border town Jaigaon/ Phuentsholing, Bhutan. Air-conditioned sleeper coach bus service is also available from Jalpaiguri to Kolkata (Banglashree Express).

There are several bus stands in Jalpaiguri:-

- NBSTC Depot: Government buses are available from here.
- Kadamtala Bus Terminus: Private buses to Siliguri and Islampur are available from here.
- Super Bus Stand near the Jalpaiguri railway station – Super (or non-stop) bus services to Siliguri are available from here.
- Netaji Subhas Chandra Bose Private Bus Terminus: Buses to the Dooars region, i.e., Malbazar, Birpara, are available from here.
- Bowbazaar Bus Stand: Bus services to Haldibari are available from here.

=== Air ===
The nearest airport is Bagdogra Airport, Siliguri, which lies 45 km north-west from Jalpaiguri city centre, with regular flights to major cities like Kolkata, New Delhi, Mumbai, Chennai, Bangalore, Hyderabad, Ahmedabad, Guwahati and has international connectivity with Paro and Bangkok.

== Education ==
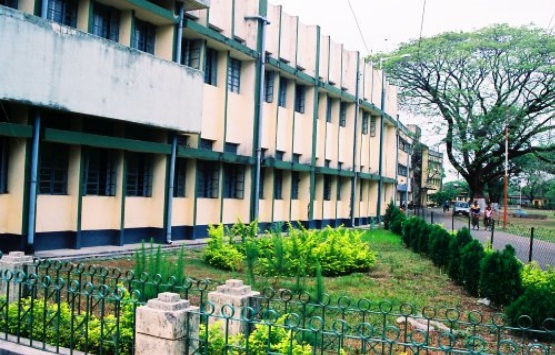
Jalpaiguri Government Engineering College (JGEC) campus

Jalpaiguri's schools are run by the state government or private organisations, many of which are religious. Bengali and English are the primary languages of instruction; Nepali and Hindi are also used. Schools in Jalpaiguri follow the "10+2+3" plan. After completing their secondary education, students typically enroll in schools that have a higher secondary facility and are affiliated with the West Bengal Council of Higher Secondary Education, the Indian Certificate of Secondary Education (ICSE), or the Central Board of Secondary Education (CBSE). They usually choose a focus on liberal arts, business, or science. Vocational programs are also available. In 2012, the Government proposed a medical college for the suburb of Paharpur.

Colleges include:

- Jalpaiguri Government Engineering College is an autonomous institution of the Government of West Bengal, one of premier technical institutes is present in Jalpaiguri, best known for scientists like Promode R. Bandyopadhyay. It is located near the National Highway 27 (West Bengal State Highway 12A) at Denguajhar, Jalpaiguri. The institute is one of the oldest institutes of engineering in the state.
- Jalpaiguri Government Medical College and Hospital, established in 2022, is a full-fledged tertiary referral Government Medical college. It is located at Jalpaiguri town of West Bengal. The college imparts the degree of Bachelor of Medicine and Surgery (MBBS). The hospital associated with the college is one of the largest hospitals in the Jalpaiguri district. The yearly undergraduate student intake is 100 from the year 2022.
- Jalpaiguri Law College is the city's law college.
- North Bengal St. Xavier's College, all of which are affiliated with the University of North Bengal. Also, since 2011, the second campus of the university with the same name provides with master's degrees in arts, sciences, and commerce.

== Notable people ==
- Promode R. Bandyopadhyay, Indian born American inventor, research scientist and Technical Program Manager at the Naval Undersea Warfare Center, New Port, Rhode Island, USA
- P. K. Banerjee, Indian footballer and coach who represented India at the international level.
- Swapna Barman, the heptathlete was born here.
- Ratan Lal Basu, an economist, fiction author in English, Indologist and specialist in Yoga and Tantra cult.
- Moushumi Bhowmik, the eminent singer-songwriter was born here.
- Mimi Chakraborty, Tollywood actress and Member of Parliament from Jadavpur constituency.
- Sukalyan Ghosh Dastidar, Indian footballer of the 1970s
- Samaresh Majumdar, Bengali author of novels like Uttoradhikar, Kalpurush, and Kaalbela.
- Debesh Roy, (17 December 1936 — 14 May 2020) Bengali-language writer, best known the Sahitya Akademi Award-winning novel Teesta Parer Brittanta (1990).
- Khaleda Zia, Former Prime Minister of Bangladesh during 1991 to 1996 & 2001 to 2006 and leader of Bangladesh Nationalist Party.

== See also ==
- Roman Catholic Diocese of Jalpaiguri
- Cities and towns in West Bengal
