= National Highway 81 (India, old numbering) =

Highway of India

National Highway 81

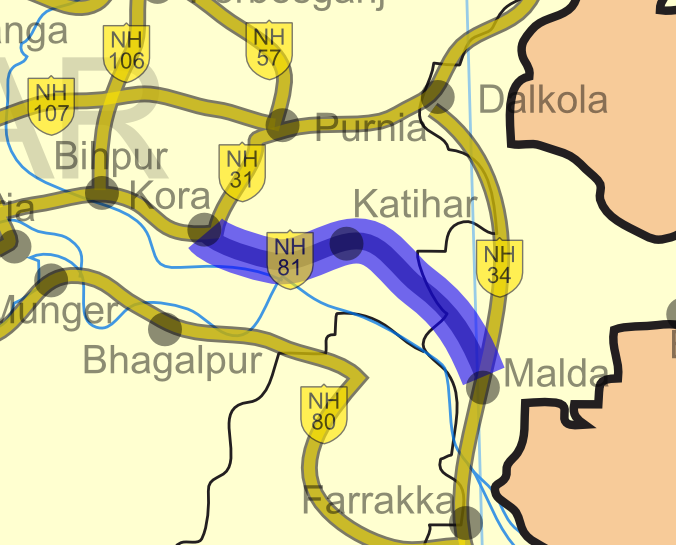

Route information
- Length: 100 km (62 mi)

Major junctions
- From: Kora – junction with NH 31
- To: Malda – junction with NH 34

Location
- Country: India
- States: Bihar: 45 km (28 mi); West Bengal: 55 km (34 mi)
- Primary destinations: Katihar

Highway system
- Roads in India; Expressways; National; State; Asian
← NH 80	→ NH 82

National Highway 81 (NH 81) is a National Highway in Eastern Indian states of Bihar and West Bengal. NH 81 links Kora in Bihar to Malda in West Bengal. Of its 100 km (62 mi) length, NH 81 runs for 45 km (28 mi) in Bihar and 55 km (34 mi) in West Bengal. In 2010, the highway was renumbered to form various sections of present-day NH 31 and NH 131A.

== See also ==
- National highways of India
- List of national highways in India
- National Highways Development Project
