= Haldibari–New Jalpaiguri line =

Railway line in India

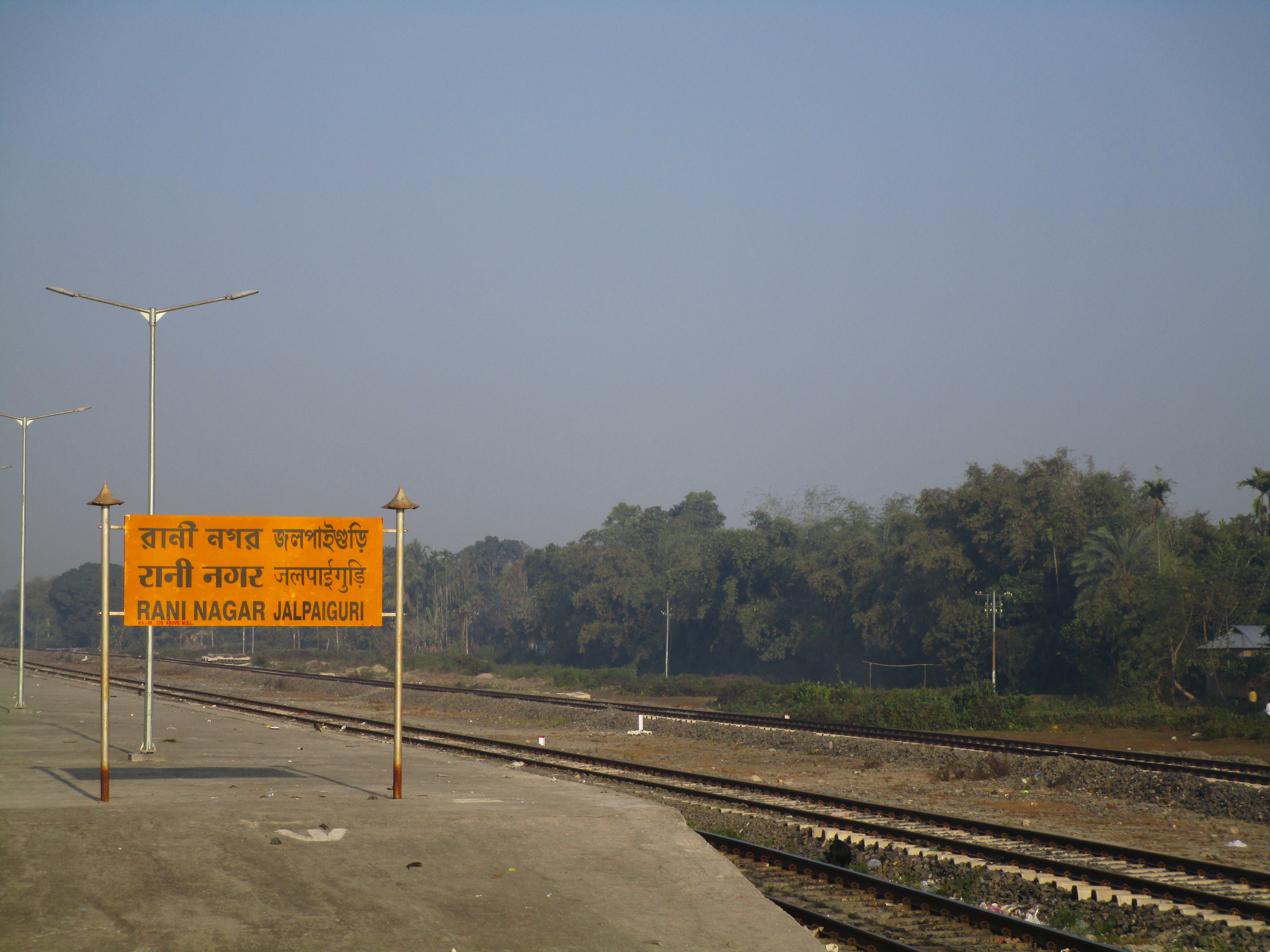
- Raninagar Jalpaiguri Junction lies on the Haldibari–New Jalpaiguri line

Overview
- Status: Operational
- Owner: Indian Railways
- Locale: North Bengal
- Termini: Haldibari; New Jalpaiguri
- Stations: 11

Service
- Operator(s): Northeast Frontier Railway

History
- Opened: 1878

Technical
- Line length: 58 kilometres (36 mi)
- Track gauge: 5 ft 6 in (1,676 mm) broad gauge
- Operating speed: 110 km/h (68 mph)

The Haldibari–New Jalpaiguri line connecting Haldibari in Cooch Behar district and New Jalpaiguri in Jalpaiguri district in the Indian state of West Bengal, was since 1878 a part of the Kolkata–Siliguri broad-gauge route. With the partition of India in 1947, while the main part of the route lay in East Pakistan, later Bangladesh, the two ends of the route lying in India were detached. (For more details see Howrah–New Jalpaiguri line). However, the route continued to be operational till the Indo-Pakistani War of 1965. Thereafter, the route had been closed till its reopening in 2020. The rest of the line had been in use in the respective countries.

== Gauge changes ==
The Siliguri–Haldibari line has gone through two successive gauge changes. The line was initially built in 5 ft 6 in (1,676 mm) broad gauge by the Eastern Bengal Railway. After partition of India since most of the other railway tracks in the area were metre gauge, the line was converted from 5 ft 6 in (1,676 mm) broad gauge to metre gauge in 1949. Then in the 1960s, when broad gauge was introduced in the area, the line was converted back to broad gauge and connected to the new station at New Jalpaiguri.

== Haldibari–Chilahati section ==
There were regular services running through the Haldibari-Chilahati section until the Indo-Pakistani War of 1965 following which the services were abandoned. Following the independence of Bangladesh there were plans to re-open the section. Bangladesh Railway had to construct 7.5 kilometres of new rail tracks from Chilahati to reach the border while the Indian authorities had to set up 4.5 kilometres of tracks from its border to Haldibari railway station.

In the Joint Statement issued on the occasion of the visit of the Prime Minister of India to Bangladesh, on 7 September 2011, it was stated: " Bangladesh Prime Minister expressed her appreciation to the Indian Prime Minister for amendment of the MoU between the Bangladesh and Indian Railways allowing Rohanpur-Singabad as an additional route for both bulk and container cargo for Nepalese rail transit traffic. Bangladesh side also appreciated the assistance from India for the movement of fertilizers from Bangladesh to Nepal by rail route. They also agreed to re-establish rail connections between Chilahati–Haldibari and Kulaura–Mahishashan in the spirit of encouraging revival of old linkages and transport routes between the two countries."

The Haldibari-Chilhati section was reopened on 17 December 2020. The railway link was inaugurated by the Indian prime minister Narendra Modi and his Bangladeshi counterpart Sheikh Hasina, in a virtual bilateral summit.

== Electrification ==
The New Jalpaiguri–Raninagar Jalpaiguri section was completely electrified in 2021 as a part of the Katihar-Guwahati route electrification. The Raninagar Jalpaiguri-Haldibari section's electrification was completed on 10 January 2024.
