= Hili railway station =

Railway station in Dinajpur District, Bangladesh

Hili হিলি
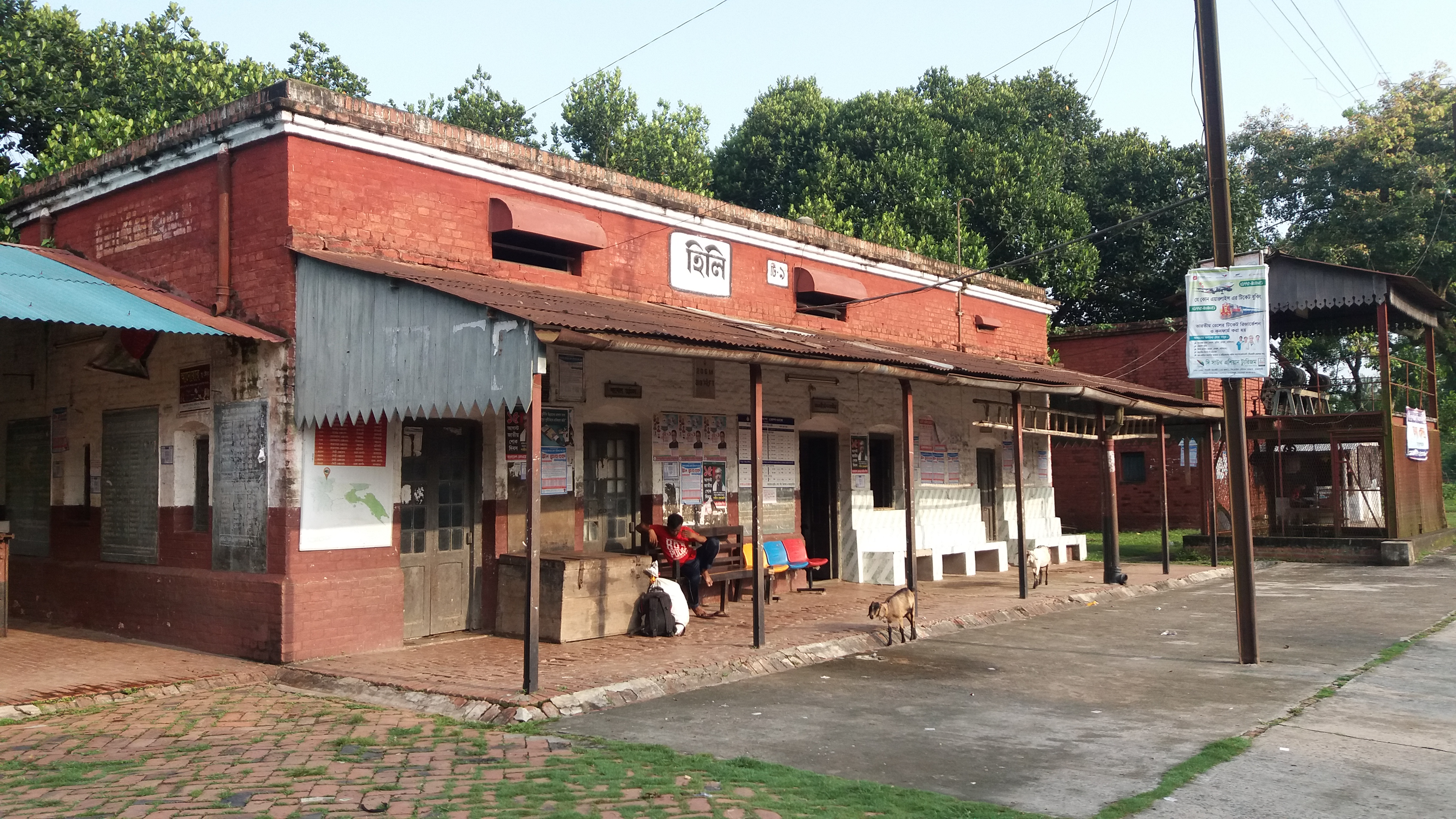

General information
- Location: Dinajpur, Rangpur; Bangladesh
- Coordinates: 25°16′40″N 89°00′25″E
- System: Bangladesh Railway Station
- Line: Chilahati-Parbatipur-Santahar-Darshana line

Construction
- Structure type: Standard (on ground station)

Other information
- Status: Functioning

History
- Opened: 1878
- Former names: North Bengal Railway
Location
- Location within Bangladesh

Hili railway station (Bengali: হিলি রেলওয়ে স্টেশন) is a railway station in Hakimpur Upazila in Dinajpur District of Rangpur Division in Bangladesh. It is right on the Bangladesh-India border and has land border crossing arrangements. The other side of the border is also Hili - Hili, Dakshin Dinajpur.

== History ==
From 1878, the railway route from Kolkata, then called Calcutta, to Siliguri was in two laps. The first lap was a 185 km (115 mi) journey along the Eastern Bengal State Railway from Calcutta Station (later renamed Sealdah) to Damookdeah Ghat on the southern bank of the Padma River, then across the river in a ferry and the second lap of the journey. A 336 km (209 mi) metre gauge line of the North Bengal Railway linked Saraghat on the northern bank of the Padma to Siliguri.

The Kolkata-Siliguri main line was converted to broad gauge in stages. The Shakole-Santahar section was converted in 1910–1914, when Hardinge Bridge was under construction. The Hardinge Bridge was opened in 1915 and the Santahar-Parbatipur section was converted in 1924. The journey to Kolkata from Hili was only eight hours prior to 1947.

During partition of India, the India-Pakistan border ran through Hili town, with around three fourths of the town in East Pakistan, later Bangladesh. Hili railway station located in Bangladeshi territory is a stone's throw away from Indian territory.

== Trade and smuggling ==
Much trade between Bangladesh and India goes on via the Hili border. Smuggling is rampant at the Hili border. Smuggled goods comprise sugar, onion, saris, medicines and even contraband drugs. Bangladesh border guards hold up trains to help the smugglers.
