= Chaul Kora, Sivasagar =

Village in Sivasagar district, Assam, India

Coordinates: 26.9905°N 94.5945°E

Chaul Kora or Chaulkara is a small rural village in the Sivasagar tehsil, Sivasagar district, Assam state, India. In the census and other sources it is qualified as No.1 in order to distinguish it from the nearly homonymous village of Charul Kora (No.2) in the same district, about 8 km to the northeast.

The village is located about 352 km east by northeast of Assam's capital Dispur, 5 km west by northwest of Sivasagar, and 10 km southeast of the Brahmaputra River, just south of the local Taxi Ali Road. It is also about 68 km northwest of the border with Myanmar, and 70 km southeast of the border with Arunachal Pradesh, the Indian state that is disputed by China. Its PIN is 785667 and its census village code is 292668.

In the 2011 census, the village had 815 households and 3597 inhabitants (including 340 children 0–6), and an adult literacy level of 95%. The town has a Hindu temple dedicated to Vishnu, and a mosque.
