= Charul Kora, Sivasagar =

Village in Assam, India

Coordinates: 27.0488°N 94.6410°E

Charul Kora is a small scattered rural village in the Sivasagar tehsil, Sivasagar district, Assam state, India. In the census and other sources it is qualified as No.2 in order to distinguish it from the nearly homonymous village of Chaul Kora (No.1) in the same district, about 8 km to the southwest.

The village is located about 360 km east by northeast of Assam's capital Dispur, 9 km north of Sivasagar, and 11 km southeast of the Brahmaputra River, at the end of the local Dhai Ali Road. It is also about 70 km northwest of the border with Myanmar, and 67 km southeast of the border with Arunachal Pradesh, the Indian territory disputed by China. Its PIN is 785663 and its census village code is 292681.

In the 2011 census, the village had 311 households and 1576 inhabitants (including 133 children 0–6), and an adult literacy level of 93%.
