= Mitong River (Assam) =

River in India

The Mitong is a river of Sivasagar District, Assam, India. It is a tributary of the Jhanji River.
