= Sivasagar Tank (Borpukhuri) =

- Borpukhuri
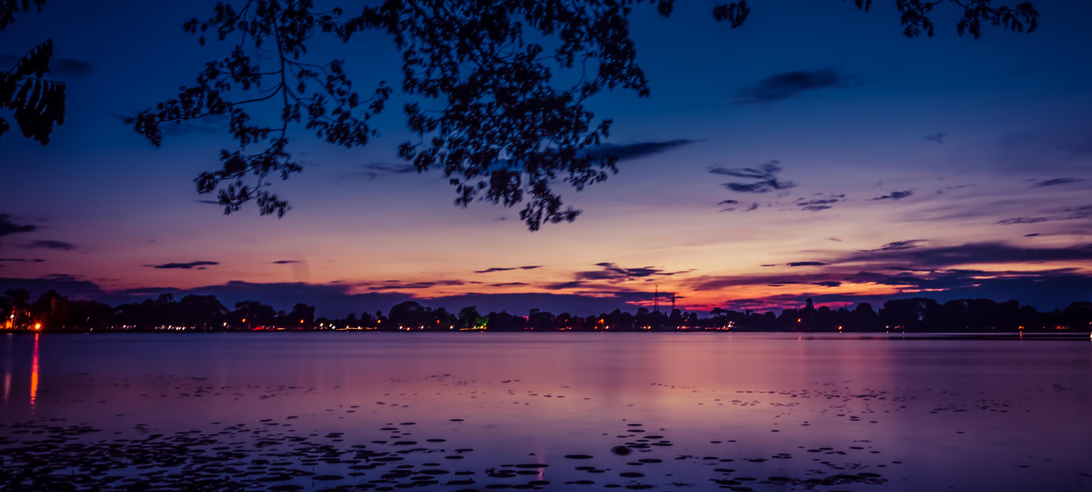
- Sivasagar Tank at night
- Interactive map of Sivasagar Tank
- Location: Sivasagar District, Assam, India
- Coordinates: 26.992°N 94.634°E
- Type: Tank
- Etymology: Swargadeo Sivasingha
- Built: 1734 by Queen Ambika
- Surface area: 120 acres (0.49 km^{2})
- Average depth: 64 feet (20 m)

Sivasagar Tank, also known as Borpukhuri, is a large tank in Sivasagar dug by the Ahoms in the 18th century. It is located in the heart of Sivasagar, Assam, India. The tank is located near the Sivasagar Sivadol, a major landmark of the town. The tank is built on an area of 120 acres (48.6 hectares) and is 64 feet (19.5 metres) deep.

== History and architecture ==
This large tank was dug by Queen Ambika, consort of Shiva Singha, in the year 1734. The water level of the tank never changes which highlights the advanced hydrology of the Ahom period. According to historian Mills, the tank was built in one night.

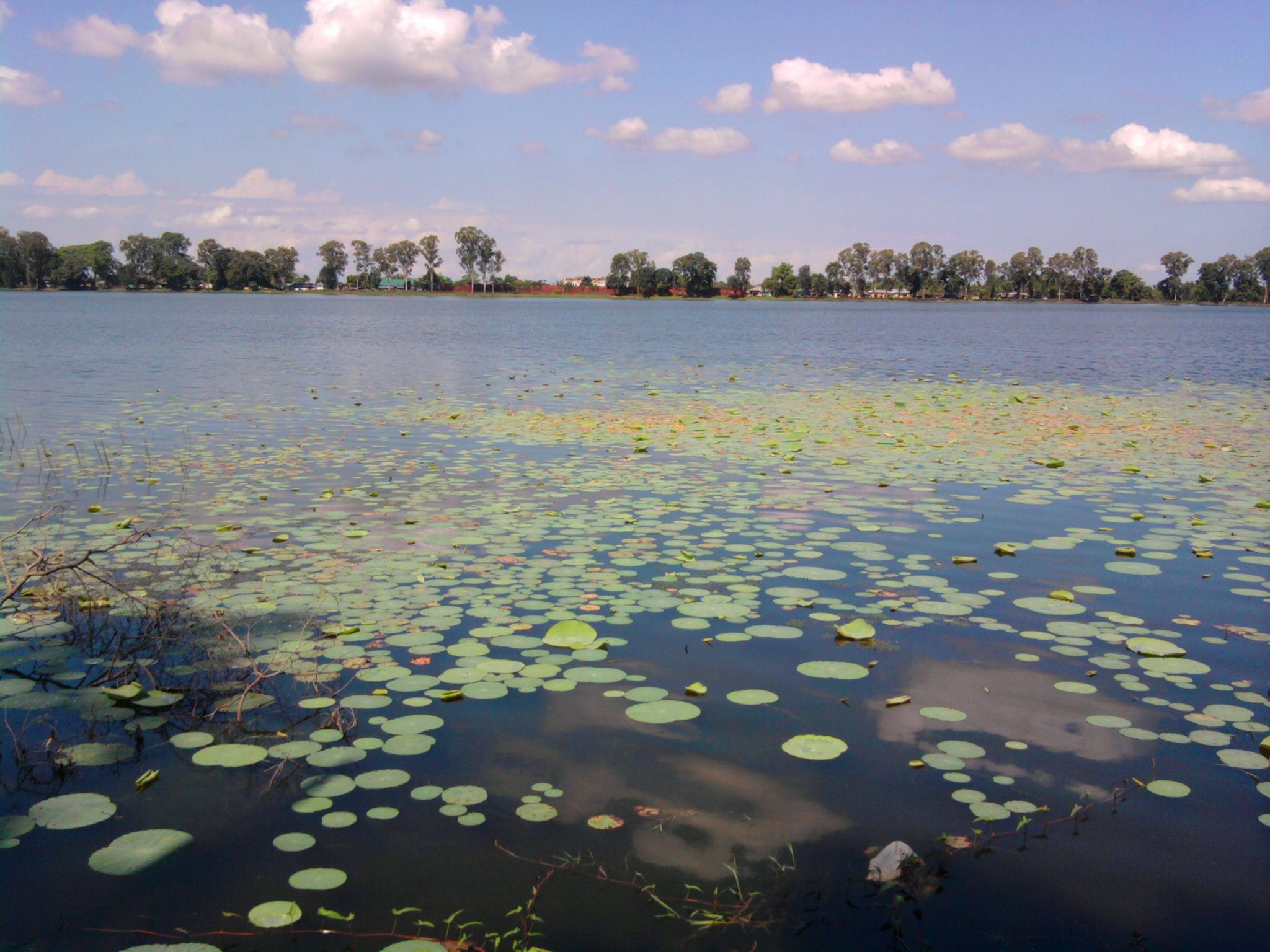
Flora in the tank

== Flora and fauna ==
Sivasagar Tank is an important habitat for migratory birds during winter season and it is also a home of many flowering plants. This makes the tank an attractive landscape in the town.

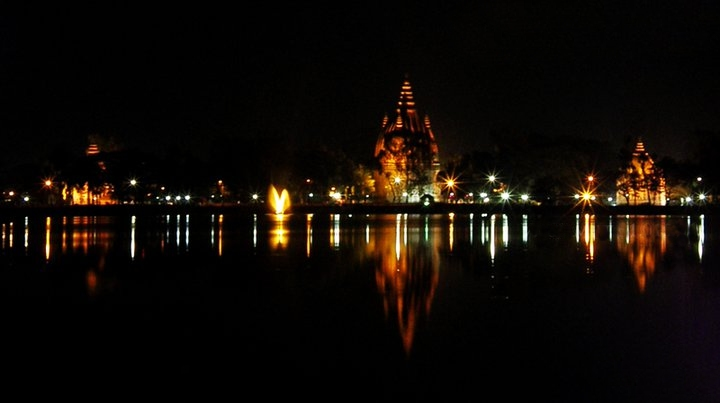
The tank in night with Sivasagar Sivadol, Vishnudol and Devidol at night.
