= Rangiya–Dibrugarh Express =

Overview
- Service type: Express
- First service: 9 October 2016; 9 years ago
- Current operator: Northeast Frontier Railway zone

Route
- Termini: Rangiya Junction (RNY); Dibrugarh (DBRG)
- Stops: 28
- Distance travelled: 604 km (375 mi)
- Average journey time: 14h
- Service frequency: Three days (Note: Runs three days in a week for every direction.)
- Train number: 15967/15968

On-board services
- Classes: Second Sitting, General Unreserved
- Seating arrangements: No
- Sleeping arrangements: Yes
- Catering facilities: On-board catering E-catering
- Observation facilities: ICF coach
- Entertainment facilities: No
- Baggage facilities: No
- Other facilities: Below the seats

Technical
- Rolling stock: 2
- Track gauge: 1,676 mm (5 ft 6 in)
- Operating speed: 40 km/h (25 mph), including halts
Route map
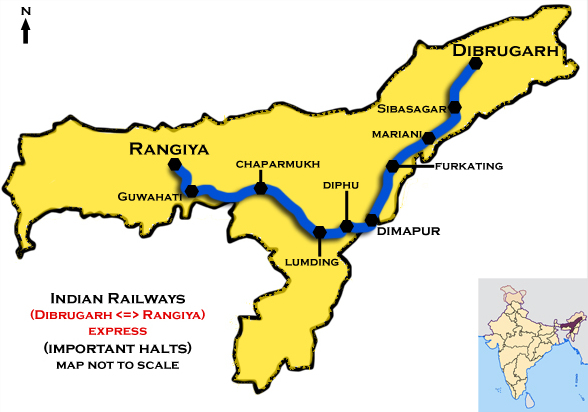

The Rangiya–Dibrugarh Express is an Express train belonging to Northeast Frontier Railway zone that runs between Rangiya Junction and Dibrugarh in India. It is currently being operated with 15967/15968 train numbers on a six days in a weekly basis.

== Service ==
The 15967/Rangiya–Dibrugarh Express has an average speed of 40 km/h and covers 604 km in 15h. The 15968/Dibrugarh–Rangiya Express has an average speed of 41 km/h and covers 604 km in 14h 45m.

== Route and halts ==
The important halts of the train are:

- Rangiya Junction
- Kamakhya Junction
- Guwahati
- Chaparmukh Junction
- Hojai
- Lanka
- Lumding Junction
- Diphu
- Dimapur
- Furkating Junction
- Titabar
- Mariani Junction
- Amguri Junction
- Simaluguri Junction
- Namrup
- Naharkatiya
- Duliajan
- New Tinsukia Junction
- Dibrugarh

== Coach composition ==
The train has standard ICF rakes with a max speed of 110 kmph. The train consists of 16 coaches:

- 2 Second Sitting
- 12 General Unreserved
- 2 Seating cum Luggage Rake(SLR)

== Traction ==
Both trains are hauled by a Guwahati Loco Shed-based WDM-2 diesel locomotive from Rangiya to Dibrugarh and vice versa.

== See also ==
The train shares its rake with 15927/15928 Rangiya–New Tinsukia Express.

== See also ==
- Rangiya Junction railway station
- Dibrugarh railway station
- Rangiya–New Tinsukia Express
