= Ambika, Bar Raja =

Ahom Consort

Ambika
- Bar Raja
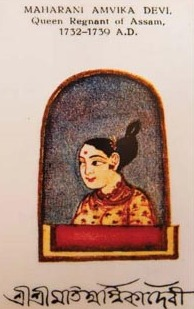
- Ambika, as Bar Raja, depicted in a manuscript c.18th century

Bar Raja
- Tenure: 1732 – 1738
- Born: Draupadi; Sivasagar
- Died: 1738; Chinatali, Ahom Kingdom (Present- day Assam, India)
- Spouse: Ramnath Solal Gohain (sep. 1732) Siva Singha (m. 1732)
- Issue: 3, including Ugra Singha
- Religion: Hinduism

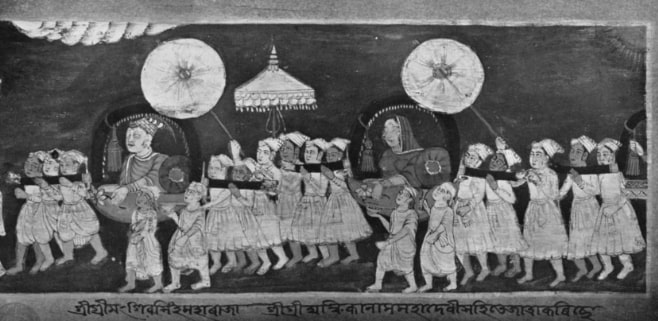
Siva Singha and Ambika in a procession, c. 1735.

Ambika, Bar Raja (born Draupadi; died 1738) was the Chief Consort of Ahom King, Sutanphaa. She became Bar Raja, shortly after the death of her older sister, Phuleshwari. She is known for constructing the Sivasagar Sivadol and the Sivasagar Tank. She was a great patron of learning and education.

== Life and marriages ==
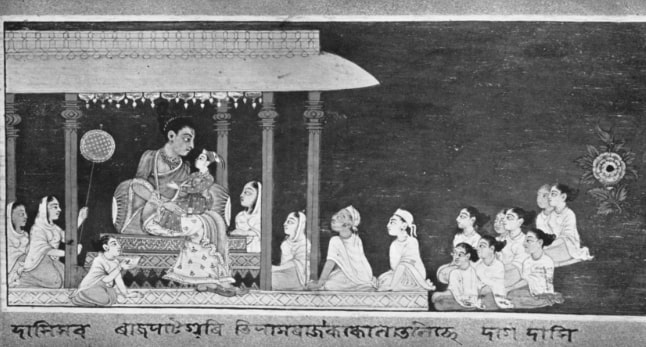
Bar Raja Ambika in the court, on her lap sitting the Tipam Raja

Ambika was born with the name Draupadi.

Draupadi was married to Ramnath Solal Gohain of the Miri Handikoi family, by whom she had two sons.

Draupadi's elder sister, Phuleshwari, died in 1731. The King, Siva Singha, then forcibly married Draupadi and forced her to separate from her husband. Her two sons from her previous marriage then lived with their father and Draupadi took on the name Ambika. They had a son, Ugra Singha, the Tipam Raja.

Ambika was a great patron of art, at her patronage, the famous manuscript on elephantry Hastividyarnava was commissioned. Bhagavada book VI, and Dharma Purana composed by Kavichandra Dvijya and illustrated by Badha Ligira, are another important works of art at that time.

Ambika died in 1738 at north of Chinatali. The King in 1739 married Akari Gabhuru, daughter of deposed Solal Gohain, of Madurial family, and conferred her the title of Bar Raja, and renamed her as Sarbeswari.
