= Mitong =

Mitong may refer to:

- Mitong River (Assam)
- Mitong River (Equatorial Guinea)
