= Rangiya–New Tinsukia Express =

Indian express train

Overview
- Service type: Express
- First service: 1 January 2010; 16 years ago
- Current operator: Northeast Frontier Railway zone

Route
- Termini: Rangiya Junction (RNY); New Tinsukia Junction (NTSK)
- Stops: 24
- Distance travelled: 596 km (370 mi)
- Average journey time: 14h 15m
- Service frequency: Six days (Note: Runs six days in a week for every direction.)
- Train number: 15927/15928

On-board services
- Classes: Second Sitting, General Unreserved
- Seating arrangements: No
- Sleeping arrangements: Yes
- Catering facilities: On-board catering E-catering
- Entertainment facilities: No
- Baggage facilities: No
- Other facilities: Below the seats

Technical
- Rolling stock: ICF coach
- Track gauge: 1,676 mm (5 ft 6 in)
- Operating speed: 42 km/h (26 mph), including halts
Route map
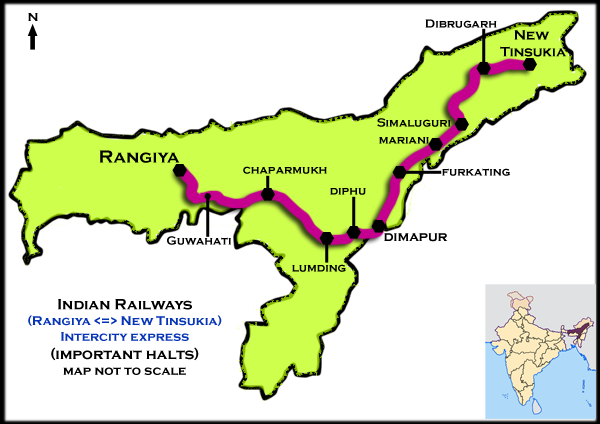

The Rangiya–New Tinsukia Express is an Express train belonging to Northeast Frontier Railway zone that runs between Rangiya Junction and New Tinsukia Junction in India. It is currently being operated with 15927/15928 train numbers on a six days in a weekly basis.

== Service ==
The 15927/Rangiya–New Tinsukia Express has an average speed of 42 km/h and covers 596 km in 14h 15m. The 15928/New Tinsukia–Rangiya Express has an average speed of 43 km/h and covers 596 km in 14h.

== Route and halts ==
The important halts of the train are:

- Rangiya Junction
- Kamakhya Junction
- Guwahati
- Chaparmukh Junction
- Hojai
- Lanka
- Lumding Junction
- Diphu
- Dimapur
- Furkating Junction
- Titabar
- Mariani Junction
- Amguri Junction
- Simaluguri Junction
- Sibsagar Town
- Dibrugarh
- New Tinsukia Junction

== Coach composition ==
The train has standard ICF rakes with a max speed of 110 kmph. The train consists of 16 coaches:

- 2 Second Sitting
- 12 General Unreserved
- 2 Seating cum Luggage Rake

== Traction ==
Both trains are hauled by a Guwahati Loco Shed-based WDM-3A diesel locomotive from Rangiya to Tinsukia, and vice versa.

== See also ==
- Rangiya Junction railway station
- New Tinsukia Junction railway station
- Rangiya–Dibrugarh Express
