= Pramatta Singha =

Ahom king from 1744 to 1751

Pramatta Singha Sunenpha
- Chaopha Swargadeo of Ahom Kingdom
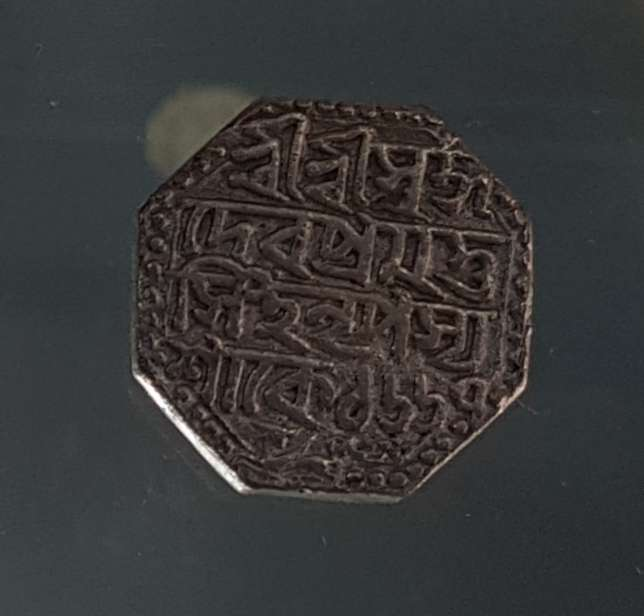
- Rupee of Pramatta Singha

Ahom King
- Reign: December 1744 – 21 October 1751
- Coronation: June 1745
- Predecessor: Siva Singha
- Successor: Rajeswar Singha
- Born: Ahom kingdom
- Died: 21 October 1751; Ahom kingdom
- Issue: Molou Gohain; Madhab Gohain
- House: Tungkhungia
- Dynasty: Ahom Dynasty
- Father: Sukhrungpha
- Religion: Hinduism

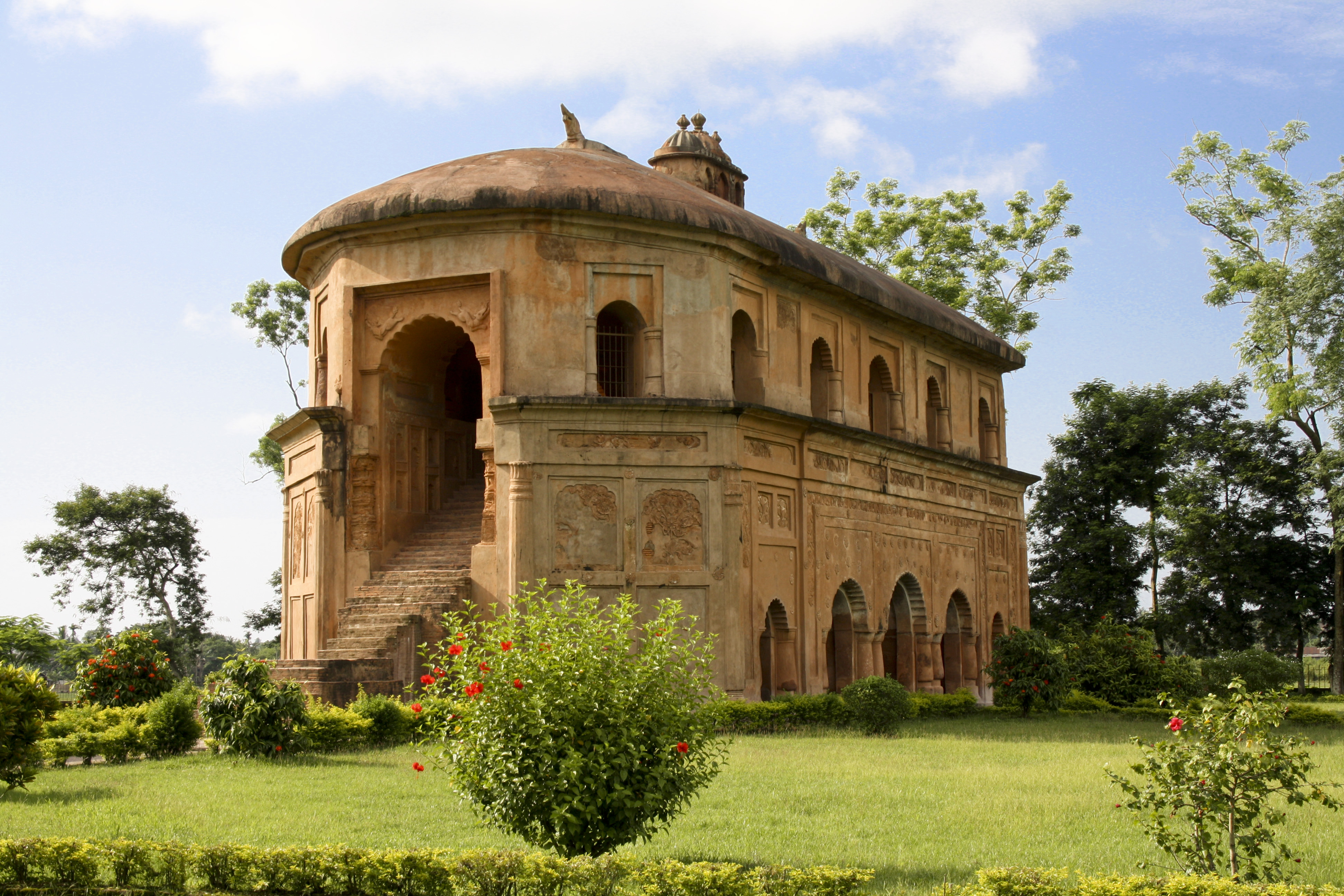
Rang Ghar

Pramatta Singha (died 21 October 1751), also known as Sunenpha, was Ahom King from 1744 until his death in 1751.

Pramatta Singha succeeded his elder brother Siva Singha. His reign of seven years was peaceful and prosperous. He constructed numerous buildings and temples. The most famous of his buildings was the Rang Ghar, which is also considered as the oldest amphitheatre in Asia.

== Ancestry and background ==
Pramatta Singha was the second son of Swargadeo Rudra Singha. During the reign of his elder brother Swargadeo Siva Singha, he held the post of Charing Raja or the heir apparent to the throne. Most of the chronicles recorded that Swargadeo Rudra Singha expressed his desire at his death-bed that all his five sons Siva Singha, Pramatta Singha, Mohanmala Maladev Gohain alias Barjana Gohain, Rajeswar Singha and Lakshmi Singha successively became king, after him. Accordingly, after the death of Swargadeo Siba Singha, Chengmung Burhagohain of Pukhuriparia clan along with some other nobles decided to install Charing Raja as the king of Ahom kingdom.

== Unsuccessful palace coup by Tipam Raja ==
=== Background ===
Ugra Singha, the son of Swargadeo Siva Singha and Queen Ambika Devi, was holding the rank of Tipam Raja, when his father died. When the Prime minister Chengmung Burhagohain and Rupchandra Borbarua, along with some other nobles decided to place Charing Raja on the throne, a section of nobles decided to oppose their decision. The Kalugayan Borpatrogohain, the Dihingia Borgohain and the Dihingia Naobaicha Phukan took up the cause of Tipam Raja, and assembled the attendants and servitors employed in the interior of the royal household in one place, and made up their minds to install the Tipam Raja as king. After Swargadeo Siva Singha had died, the Tipam Raja left his feet and took his bath. He then armed his adherents with swords, shields, spears, arrows and bows, and asking them to remain ready for action he himself waited in full preparedness.

=== Palace confrontation ===
Meanwhile, Charing Raja and his three brothers, accompanied by Chengmung Burhagohain and Rupchandra Borbarua, confronted the Tipam Raja's party at the palace. Chengmung Burhagohain and Rupchandra Borbarua said to Tipam Raja:

"We have brothers and sons of the deceased king entitled to sit on the throne. If you do not become a king who will fill up the exalted office? You have come out prepared with your attendants; is there any fighting going anywhere? A king is properly installed on the throne if he is appointed by the three Dangarias and the Baruas and Phukans. Can these urchins of slaves ever appoint a king?"

The Burhagohain asked the Charing Raja to seize the hands of Tipam Raja, which he did accordingly. The Charing Raja had a sword in his hand. The Tipam Raja asked him to throw off the sword, and he snatched away his hand from the Charing Raja's grip. The Burhagohain advised the Charing Raja not to part with the sword. The Tipam Raja requested his followers to give him a dao(a sharp weapon), but the Burhagohain intercepted and threatened by saying that the man who would give him a dao would have even his son in the womb hacked and quartered. Saying so Chengmung Burhagohain then took out Charing Raja and his three brothers as well as the Tipam Raja, but they were confronted at the michang or ante-chamber by the bevy of household attendants. Chengmung Burhagohain then said to Rupchandra Borbarua:

"What are you looking at? Don’t you see that we are going to be massacred?"

=== Defeat of Tipam Raja ===
Just at that time Laidhan, who was a Changmai-ligira or an attendant of the royal cooked, gave the Burhagohain a sword which he pointed at the miscreants and they dispersed. The Burhagohain’s party then came out to the gate-house, and there also they were confronted by the rebels who were also dispersed after some altercation. The party then reached the courtyard of the palanquin-bearers. There, one Naga Ligira, an attendant belonging to the Dihingia family, having placed himself at the head of forty shields men of the Lukhurasun clan, confronted the royalists on the way. He was also disbanded.

== Accession ==
After neutralizing the supporters of Ugra Singha Tipam Raja, son of Swargadeo Siva Singha, in the royal palace, Prime-minister Chengmung Burhagohain and Rupchandra Borbarua received the Charing Raja at the principal court-chamber and said; "Charing Raja, we hereby appoint you king." The Burhagohain then led the new king to the elevated platform and announced as follows:

"The brother of the deceased sovereign has become king. All the subjects including the Baruas and the Phukans should now offer their homage and kneel down before him."

Then the people assembled knelt down before the newly appointed monarch. The Burhagohain then counseled the new monarch as follows:

"The great God has conferred on you the position of a sovereign. Your duty will be the protection of the virtuous, and punishment of the wicked, an investigation into the weal and woe of your subjects. Just as a person does not feel the heat when sitting below a huge tree, so under the shelter of your elder brother’s government you are tainted by the merits or demerits of the subjects. From today you have become the fountain of all their actions, virtuous or wicked. Your Majesty should regulate the acts according to the principle of their inspiring wicked or virtuous deeds. You have three younger brothers. They should also be protected and maintained by you as your own sons. They in their turn should pay homage to you regarding you as their father. They will succeed to the kingly office according to their seniority. You should not reject from your protection the Tipam Raja as well. Your Majesty should love him as your son."

After saying so the Burhagohain bathed the body of the deceased king and ascended the royal chamber for laying on the winding sheet. After few days, the Burhagohain removed the body of Swargadeo Siva Singha to Charaideo and buried it there.

The Singarigharutha ceremony or the coronation ceremony, held in June 1745, of the new king continued for eight days. The Tai-Ahom priests, the Deodhais and the Bailungs conferred on him the title Sunenphaa, while the Hindu Brahmins bestowed him the title Pramatta Singha. Envoys from Kachari kingdom and Jaintia kingdom attended the Singarigharutha ceremony or the coronation ceremony of Pramatta Singha.

== Reign ==
=== Punishment of the rebels ===
On the ground of the supporting Tipam Raja's coup against the accession of Pramatta Singha to the throne, the Kalugayan Borpatrogohain was dismissed and Mrittunjay Gohain from Kenduguria family was appointed as the Borpatrogohain; and similarly Khamcheng Gohain, son of Laithepena Borgohain, was appointed Borgohain in place of Dihingia Borgohain who had been dismissed. In addition to the above punishments the following were also chained and imprisoned in the elephant-stall, the Dhekial Barua, and his son the Lari Gohain, the Tipamia Phukan and the attendants Birah and Naga, and a few other shieldsmen. In the month of Phagun of Hindu-calendar (February–March), the Sraddha ceremony of the deceased king was performed to which all the religious preachers were invited. They sang hymns to the glory of Hari, and alms and presents were distributed to them. In the month of Chaitra of Hindu-calendar (March–April) the trial of the rebels was taken up; those against whom the charges were light were let off with slight punishment and sent home. The Tipamia Phukan, the Dhekial Barua, his son Naga, and a few other miscreants had their ears and noses clipped and deported to Teji.

=== Embassy from Rani ===
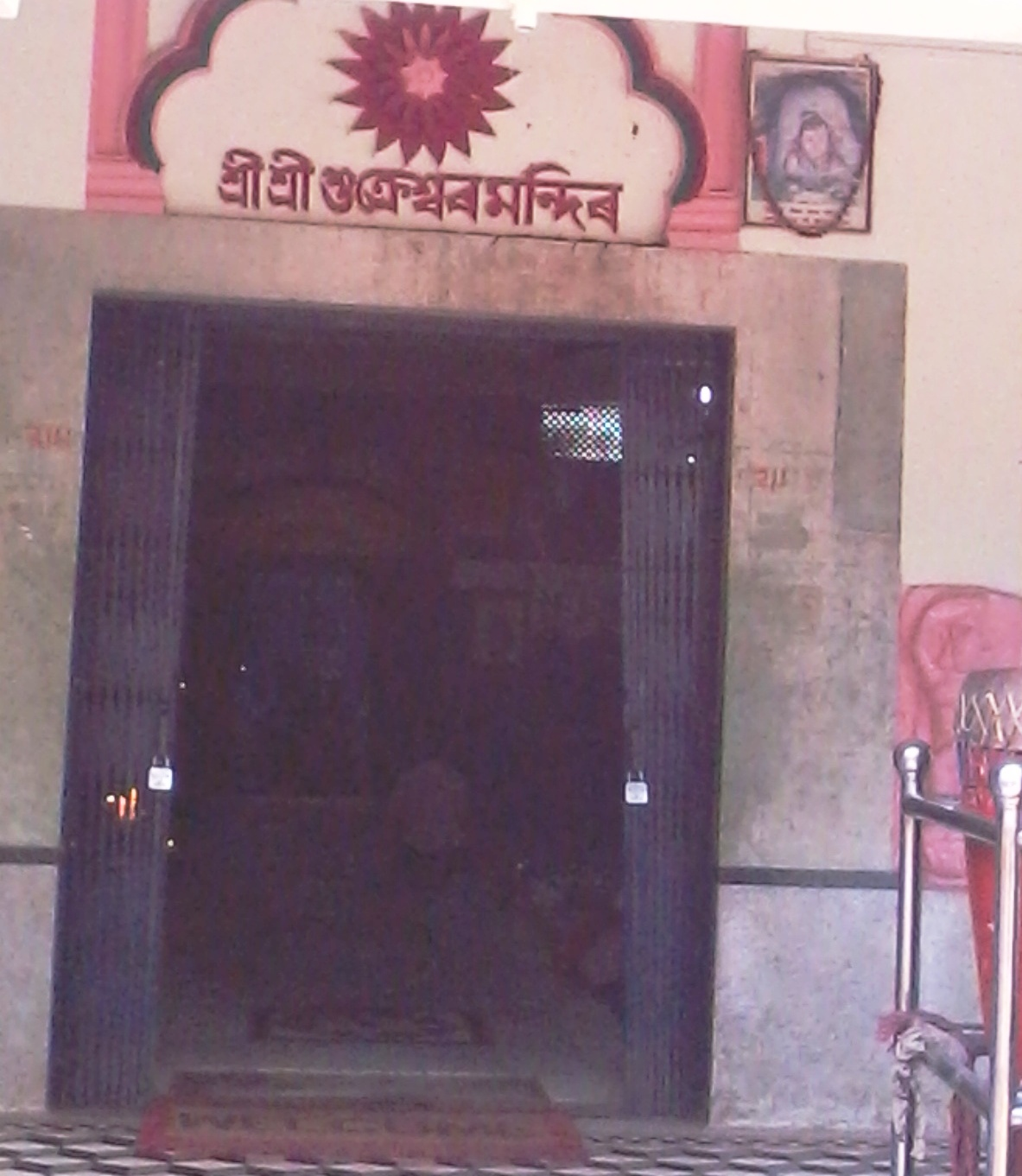
Entrance of Sukreswar Temple

It was customary for the tributary rulers under Ahom rule, to offer their submission with gifts and presents to the new king, during or after the coronation ceremony. The Ahom monarchs always maintained very friendly relationships with their tributary kingdoms. One of such tributary kingdoms was Rani, a place in southern part of Kamrup District, mostly inhabited by Karbis and Garos. Its rulers had a long association with the Ahoms since the days of Ahom-Mughal conflicts. Swargadeo Gadadhar Singha, grandfather of Swargadeo Pramatta Singha, during his princely days, was hiding in Rani at a house of a Garo woman, during the notorious reign of Lora Raja. On the occasion of the accession of Pramatta Singha, the ruler of Rani sent his envoy Rup offering his submissions and greetings to the new king. Chengmung Burhagohain received the ambassador deputed by the ruler of Rani. Vidyanivas Kataki introduced the representative of Rani. The Burhagohain then said:

"Vidyanivas, ask the Rani ambassador whether at the time of his departure from his country, the subjects of the Swargadeo living in plains and hills were in the enjoyment of peace and plenty. When did he arrive here? Has he encountered any fear or trouble in his journey?"

On being thus interrogated by Vidyanivas the Rani ambassador said: The Burhagohain again added:

"It is our wish that the subjects of the Swargadeo living in plains and hills should pass their days in peace and happiness."

The ambassador of Rani then replied:

"We Mikirs and Garos live in the interior of hills. The Swargadeo used to give us the bones of cows looking upon us as insignificant as shrubs on the way or dogs on the road. But for many years we have not been blessed with the good grace of the Swargadeo. We have also been comparatively weakened by the cessation of royal favour. I have been deputed by my countrymen to win back the kindness of the Swargadeo."

The Burhagohain then replied:

"Vidyanivas, tell the ambassador that the prayer of the wild monkeys even was granted by Lord Ramachandra as it was made with proper reverence and love."

Gifts and presents for the ruler of Rani were sent along with Rup, the ambassador of Rani, on his return journey.

=== Temples and edifices ===
The reign of Swargadeo Pramatta Singha was marked with peace and prosperity of the Ahom Kingdom. He utilized his peaceful reign in the construction of temples and buildings. He constructed the famous Rang Ghar, an amphitheater made of bricks and had two roofs, for the purpose of animal fights and other amusements during the festivals like Bihu. Even though his father Swargadeo Rudra Singha constructed an amphitheater during his reign, it was made of wood and bamboo. The Rang Ghar is reputed as the oldest existing amphitheater in Asia. Pramatta Singha also caused the gatehouses of Garhgaon to be built in bricks.

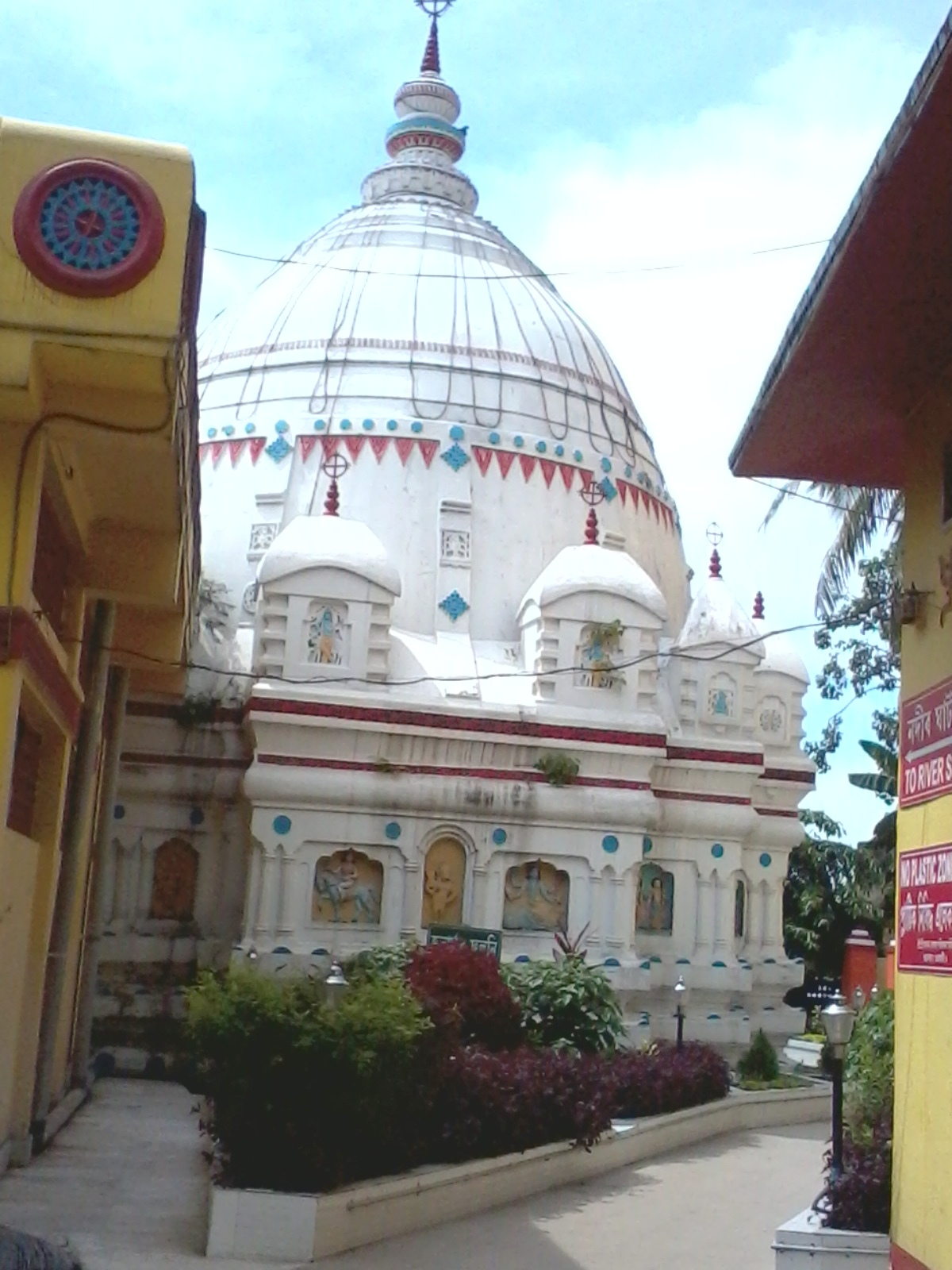
Janardan Temple

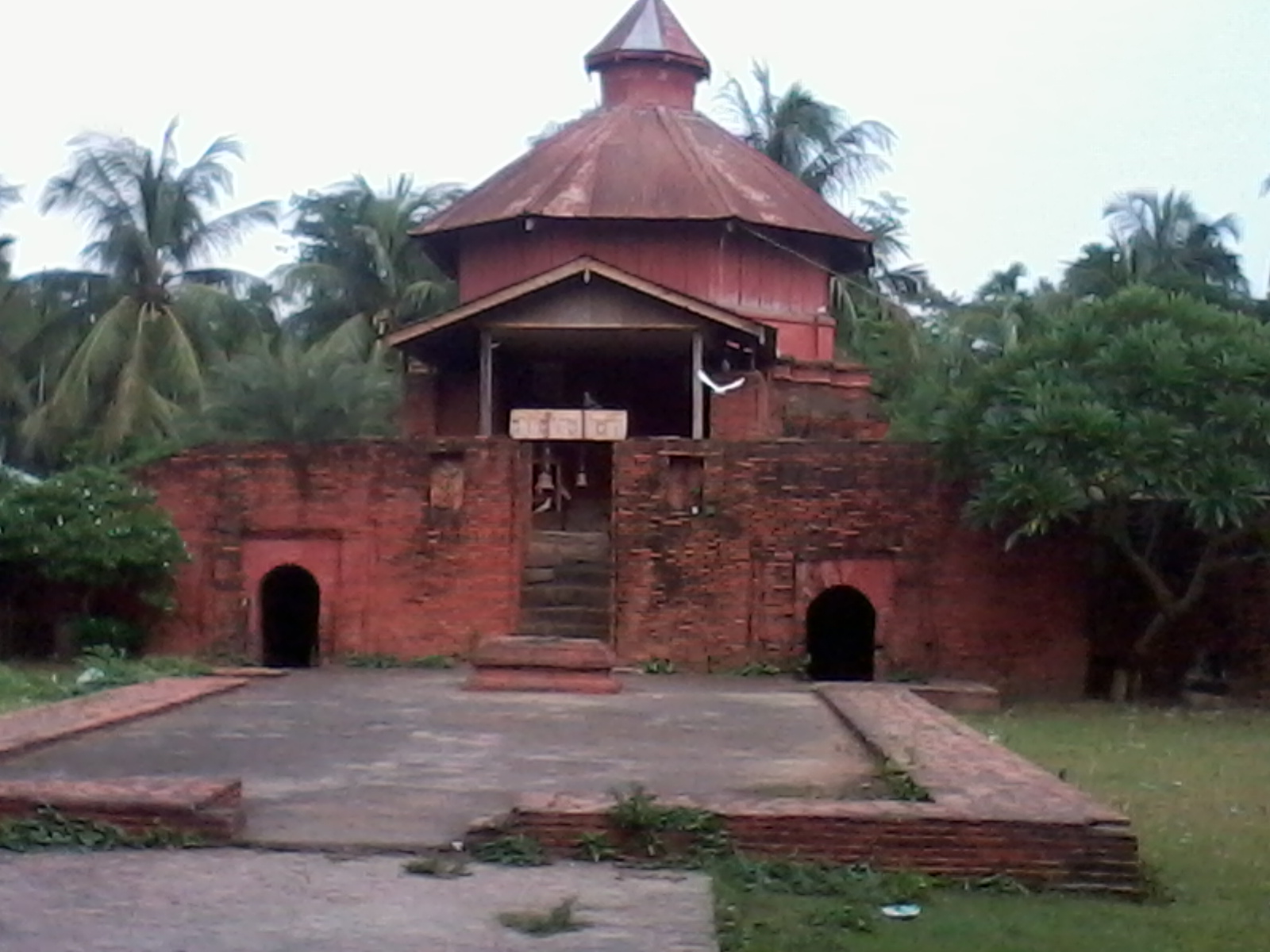
Rudreswar Devaloya in North Guwahati

He also erected the temples of Sukreswar and Janardan in Guwahati. In 1749 CE, he raised a temple at North Guwahati at the place where his father Swargadeo Rudra Singha had died; an image of Shiva named Rudreswar was placed in the temple, and lands and paiks were endowed for the maintenance of the temple. The temple is known as Rudreswar Temple and hence the village was named Rudreswar. He also constructed several buildings in Hajo, which includes one Ganesh temple and the Fakuwa Dol, located near the Hayagriva Madhava Temple, where every year the festival of Holi is celebrated. The boundary wall around Hayagriva Madhava Temple, also around the steps leading to the temple premises were also constructed during his reign.

=== Land Survey at Kamrup ===
In 1754 CE Swargadeo Pramatta Singha initiated a fresh settlement operation in Kamrup and Lower Assam. Arrangements were made for the maintenance of records of land rights.

== Death ==
Swargadeo Pramatta Singha died on 23 October 1751. An interesting story circulates around the death of Swargadeo Pramatta Singha. The king used to complain about severe headache from time to time. It was said that he had a vision in his dream that if he offers prayers in the holy shrine of Islam, his headache would get cure. Therefore, one Muslim cleric was selected and arrangements were made for his journey to Mecca. The cleric was instructed to offer prayers for the king's well-being and good health. As instructed, the cleric went to Mecca and prayed for the king's good health and long life. He returned to the capital Rangpur after a gap of two and a half years, but before he reached the capital, the king died due to illness.

== Family and issue ==
Swargadeo Pramatta Singha was survived by two sons, named Molou Gohain and Madhab Gohain. None of them could succeed him as king, since the nobles led by Kirti Chandra Borbarua installed Bonda Gohain alias Romanath Gohain, the younger brother of the late king, on the throne, who was proclaimed as Swargadeo Rajeswar Singha after the coronation ceremony. Molou Gohain was appointed as Tipam Raja by his uncle Swargadeo Lakshmi Singha. Later he conspired against his uncle to usurp the throne, only to be caught and executed by royal henchmen.

== Legacy ==
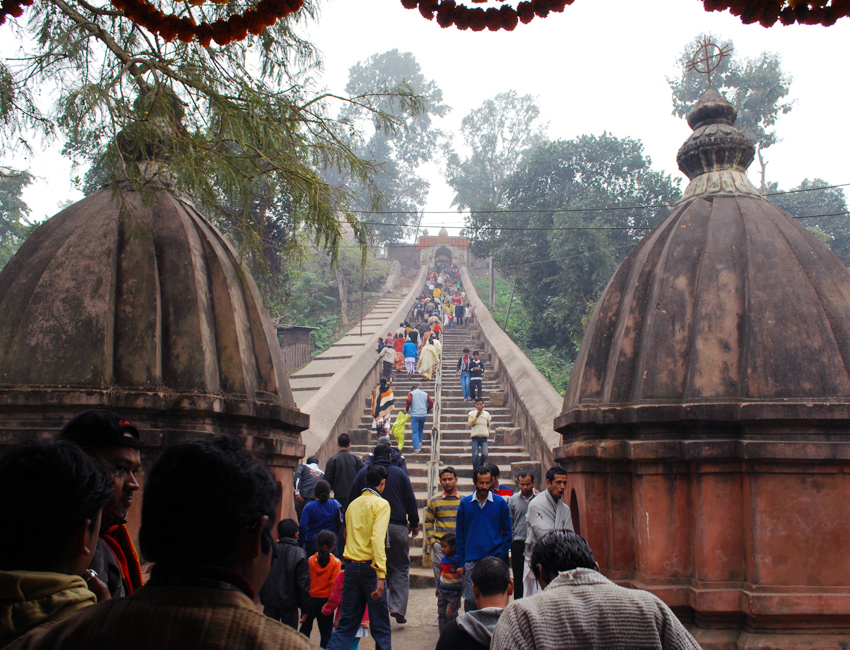
Entrance of Hayagriva Madhab mandir

In Hajo, there is local lore that Swargadeo Pramatta Singha, while on his visit to the Hayagriva Madhava Temple, witnessed a pair of Bulbul birds fighting in the temple premises. Therefore, he ordered to hold Bulbul bird fights every year in Magh Bihu, a tradition which the people of Hajo continued till recent years (banned by the supreme court recently). According to historical chronicles, there are no records of Swargadeo Pramatta Singha visiting the temple of Hayagriva Madhava; rather it was his younger brother Swargadeo Rajeswar Singha who had paid a visit to the temple during a royal tour in 1756 CE. Maybe it was Swargadeo Rajeswar Singha who had witnessed the Bulbul birds fighting in the temple premises, and the tradition of Hajo’s famous Bulbul birds fighting started since then, but since there are several buildings and temples constructed in Hajo during Pramatta Singha's reign, local people might have confused the name of these two kings.

Swargadeo Pramatta Singha was known as a kind and lenient ruler. His seven years long reign was unmarked, but remembered as peaceful and prosperous. Several buildings and temples built by him during his reign still stand today. The Ahom kingdom was at its height, which had already begun from the Tungkhungia restoration initiated by Swargadeo Gadadhar Singha and continued till the reign of Swargadeo Rajeswar Singha.
