= Devananda =

Devananda is a name or surname. Notable people with the surname include:

- Douglas Devananda (born 1957), Sri Lankan politician
- Devananda Bharali (1883–1972), Indian linguist, writer, translator, and dramatist
- Sri Devananda College, College in Sri Lanka
