= Hastividyarnava =

Illuminated manuscript

A folio from the Hastividyarnava manuscript

The Hastividyārnava, written by Sukumar Barkaith, is one of the best known illustrated manuscripts of Assam. Commissioned under the patronage of King Siva Singha (1714–1744 C.E.) and his queen consort Ambika, it deals with the management and care of elephants in the royal stables.

The Hastividyārnava is a work that arose in a matrix of disciplined study, prolonged observation and a precedent tradition. The commission of such a treatise was perhaps considered important as the elephant played an important role in affirming the idea of monarchy and exercising state power.

== Contents ==
The treatise itself was written for a ruling monarch, and almost entirely from the view of sustaining monarchy – which elephants are suitable for the kingdom, how they should be trained for use by the nobility and for the purpose of war. The Hastividyārnava has an elaborate taxonomic system describing the various types of elephants and their character, and it was perhaps considered important for a king to have knowledge regarding elephants, as it is mentioned that only the learned king recognizes particular breeds.

== Artists ==
The two artists Dilbar and Dosai who painted the manuscript were probably not very familiar with the landscape of Assam and hence the quality of the landscapes are not of a very high standard.

== Current location and status ==
The manuscript is currently housed in the Department of Historical and Antiquarian Studies (DHAS) in Guwahati, Assam. The Hastividyarnava should not be confused with the Hati-Puthi of Auniati Sattra (Majuli), which is a much later work (possibly of the early 19th century).
