= Sivasagar Sivadol =

Hindu temple in India

Shivadol
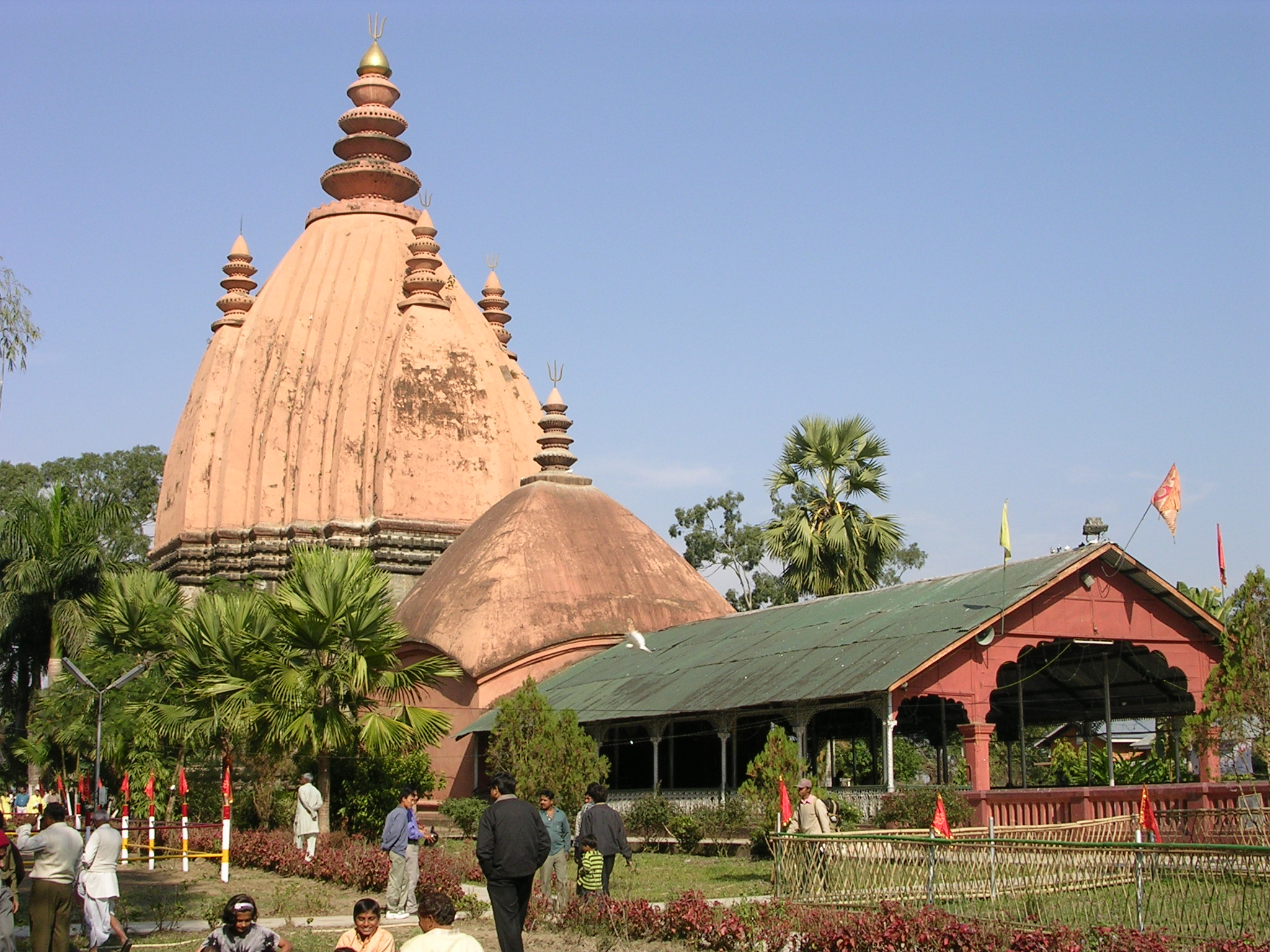
- Sivasagar Sivadol (Temple)

Religion
- Affiliation: Hinduism
- District: Sivasagar district
- Deity: Shiva
- Festival: Mahashivaratri

Location
- Location: Sivasagar
- State: Assam
- Country: India
- Interactive map of Shivadol
- Coordinates: 26.9888°N 94.6313°E

Architecture
- Type: Ahom architecture
- Creator: Bar Raja Ambika
- Completed: 1734; 292 years ago
- Temple: 3

Shiva dol (meaning the temple of Shiva) is a group of structures comprising three Hindu temples of Sivadol, Vishnudol (temple of Vishnu) and Devidol (temple of Durga in the local Assamese language) shrines, and a museum. These are located on the banks of the Sivasagar ("the ocean of the god Shiva") tank, also known as the Borpukhuri tank, in the heart of Sivasagar, in the Indian state of Assam. The tank was constructed between 1731 and 1738 and the temples were built in 1734 by Bar Raja Ambika, queen of Ahom king Swargadeo Siva Singha (1714–1744). The height of the Sivadol (dol means temple in Assamese) is 104 feet (32 m) and the perimeter is 195 feet (59 m) at the base. It is crowned with an 8-foot (2.4 m) high golden-dome.

Siva Doul ,Sivasagar,Assam,India ,front view

== Location ==
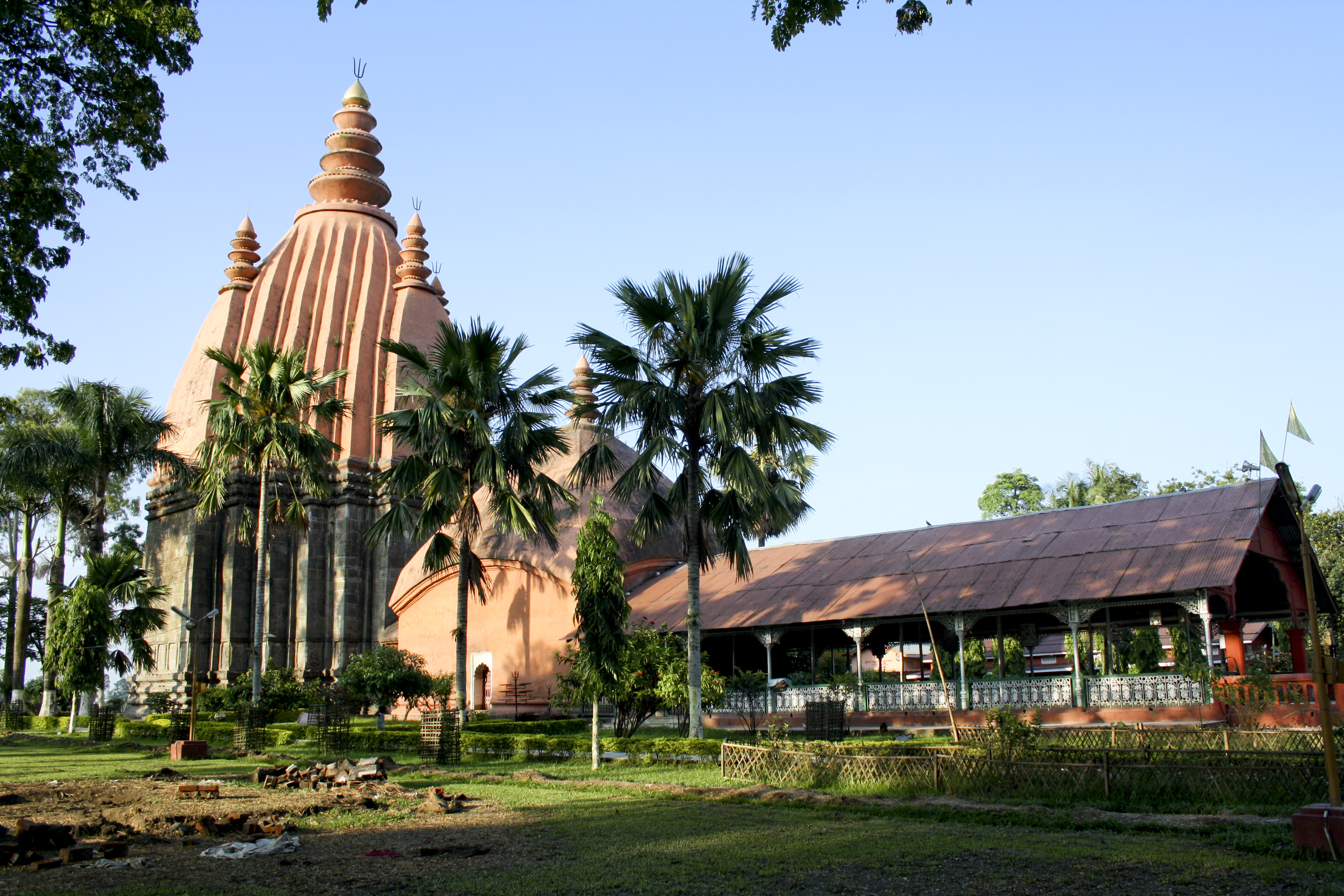
Side view of Sivasagar Sivadol

Sivasagar Sivadol is located at 26°59'18"N and 94°37'59"E, in the heart of the Sivasagar city, which was known earlier as Sibsagar in the Sibsagar district of Upper Assam in Northeast India.

== History ==
Sivsagar, present day Sivasagar, was the capital of Ahom kingdom. The Ahoms had migrated from South China in 1228 and established their first capital at Charaideo 28 kilometres (17 mi) from present day Sivasagar in 1253. Initially they were / Ancestor worshippers close what we see in Taoism and Shinto, and very much a part of the practices till date Buddhists some of the practices of Mahayana and Theravada school of thoughts, though Hinduism came to prevail. It was the capital of the Ahom Kingdom till the British Raj was established in India. The tank was constructed between 1731 and 1738 and the temples were built in 1734 by Bar Raja Ambika, queen of Ahom king Swargadeo Siba Singha.

Siva Doul Sivsagar ,Assam,India ASI Monument Details

== Sivasagar tank ==
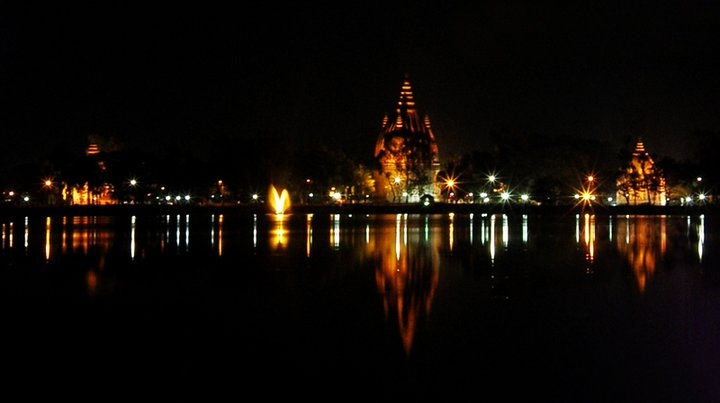
Night view of the Sivasagar lake with the three temples of Sivadol (middle), Vishnudol (left) and Devidol (right), on its bank

The Sivsagar tank was built by Bar Raja Ambika, the chief consort of Siva Singha in 1733. A battle was fought against the Moamoria rebels In its vicinity in the reign of Gaurinath Singha.The Sivasagar tank, also known as the Borpukhuri tank, was built by constructing embankments and the water level thus created in the lake remains above the adjoining ground level. The lake has a total area of 257-acre (104 ha) with a water spread of 129-acre (52 ha). It is said that the lake water remains stable throughout the year without any fluctuations even during the monsoon months. The depth of water in the lake is 27 feet (8.2 m). Many notable structures have been built on the banks of the lake. Three Hindu temples Sivadol, Visnudol and Devidol, a Buddhist shrine and a bird watching tower to watch wintering birds visiting the area, are located on its east bank. The Tai Museum located on the west bank of the tank is built with red bricks. A church and two mosques are also located on the bank of the tank.

== Sivadol ==
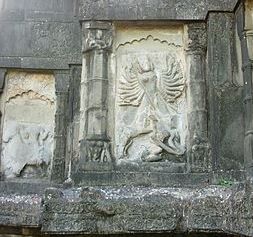
Carving depicting the Durga slaying the demon Mahishasura, on the walls of Sivadol temple

The Sivadol or Shiva temple, built in the Shikhara architecture (more specifically Ahom temple architecture), has a central tower which is said to be the tallest Shiva temple tower in India at a height of 104 feet (32 m). The base of the temple measures 195 ft (59 m) in circumference. The temple is built with stone and bricks. Inside the Garbhagriha (sanctum sanctorum), the Shiva Linga (aniconic symbol of Shiva) is deified, which is in a reverse setting. The Shikhara or Vimana (temple tower), which rises above the sanctum sanctorum, has a four-tiered, 8 feet (2.4 m) mastaka and is crowned by a kalasha made of gold. The tower itself is built with parallel ridges and furrows. The lower part of the tower is flanked by four smaller identical towers, which are known as the angashikaras. The garbagriha, where the main deity is deified in the form of a reversed Shiva linga, is interconnected with an antarala, a small antechamber, which has a roof known as do-chala, which is akin to a typical hut built in Assam. The antarala is also connected to one of the mandapas (outdoor halls). The exterior walls of the temple are embellished with sculptures and floral designs set in Bas-relief.

Some of the unique sculptures set on the outer walls of the temple are of the goddess Durga, which are seen carved with 2 arms, 4 arms, 6 arms, 10 arms and 16 arms. The sixteen armed Durga holding various weapons is a "pan-Himalayan" theme adopted in plastic arts of Ahom temple architecture. Durga is depicted decimating Mahishasura, the demon king with a buffalo head, by thrusting a spear. She is riding a lion, her mount, which supports her in the fight with the demon. This feature represents the harmonious blend of Brahminical Hindu culture with the Shaktism cult which the royalty of Ahom dynasty had adopted as their religious practice throughout their kingdom.

Siva Doul,Sibsagar,Assam,India

== Vishnudol and Devidol ==
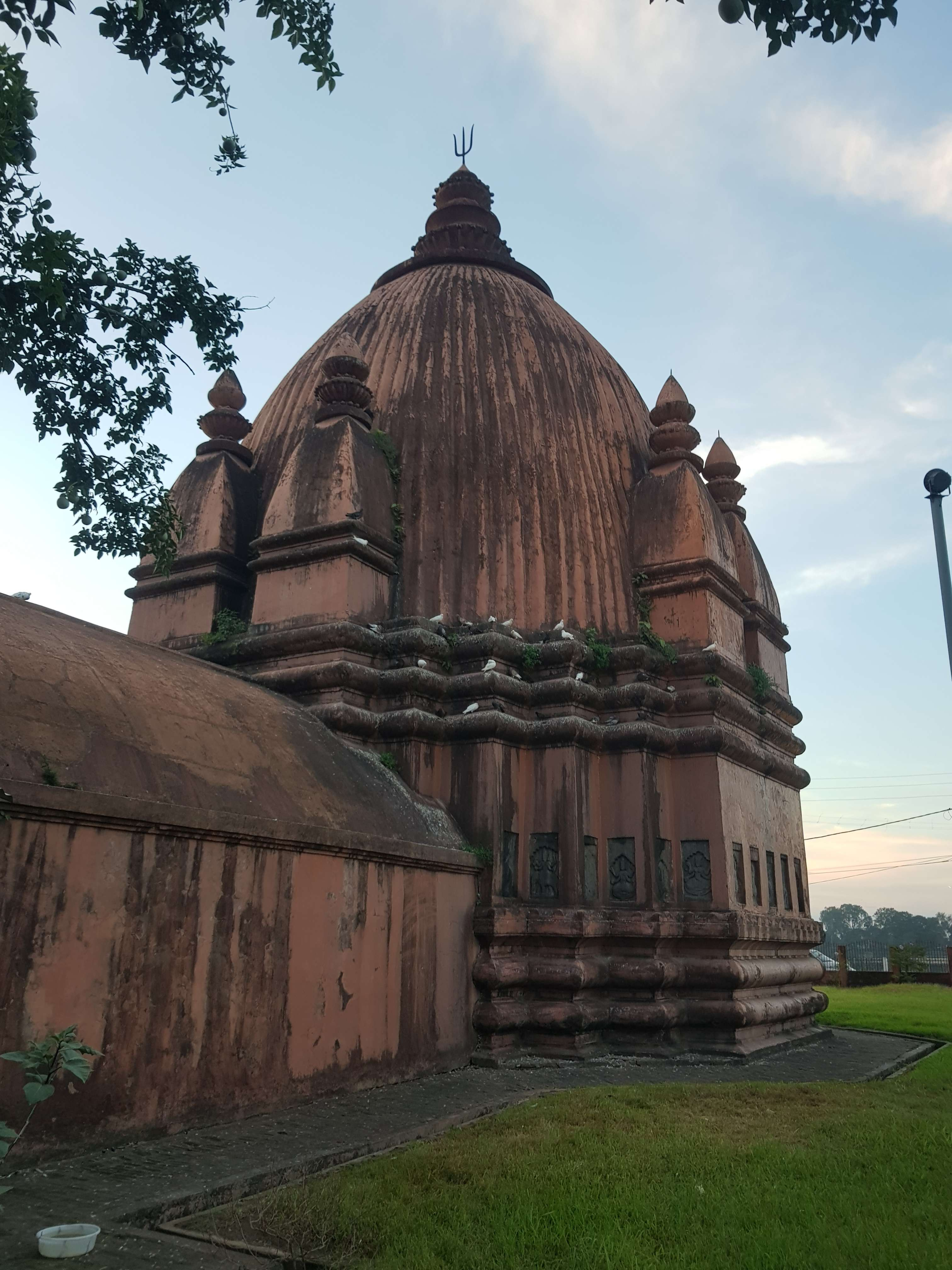
Devi dol

Sivadol is surrounded by two subsidiary temples Vishnudol (spelt as Bishnudol) and Devidol which are architecturally similar to the larger Shiva temple. Vishnudol is dedicated to the God Vishnu; Devidol, also known as Joidol, is a Goddess Durga temple. While the Vishnu temple's tower has a honeycomb design with an ornamental criss-cross framework, the Durga temple's tower is designed, in its vertical elevation, with an undulating pattern. Besides these there is a temple of Ram and Hanuman.

== Festivals ==
Every year, during the Mahashivaratri, a huge mela (fair) is organized in the Shiva temple and pilgrims visit from all parts of India to offer puja.

The Dol Yatra and Rath Yatra are two annual festivals celebrated at Vishnu Dol. Durga Puja is celebrated every year with great fervour during September–October at Devidol.

== Bibliography ==
- Barua, Dr Kanak Chandra (26 August 2014). Eimear Traveller's Guide. Notion Press. ISBN 978-93-84049-28-7.
- Barua, Hem (1962). The red river and the blue hill. Lawyer's Book Stall.
- Bernier, Ronald M. (1997). Himalayan Architecture. Fairleigh Dickinson Univ Press. p. 26. ISBN 978-0-8386-3602-2.
- Betts, Vanessa; McCulloch, Victoria (10 February 2014). Indian Himalaya Footprint Handbook: Includes Corbett National Park, Darjeeling, Leh, Sikkim. Footprint Travel Guides. ISBN 978-1-907263-88-0.
- Bhattacharya, Prasanta (2004). Tourism in Assam: Trend and Potentialities. Bani Mandir.
- Huda, Manirul (1990). Urbanisation in India: a study of Sibsagar-Assam. Mittal Publications. ISBN 978-81-7099-209-7.
- Knapp, Stephen (1 January 2009). Spiritual India Handbook. Jaico Publishing House. ISBN 978-81-8495-024-3.
- Session, Indian Art History Congress (2000). Proceedings of Indian Art History Congress. Indian Art History Congress.
