= Siva Singha =

Ahom king from 1714 to 1744

Siva Singha Sutanpha
- Swargadeo; Chaopha; Rajadhiraja; Swarganarajayandeva
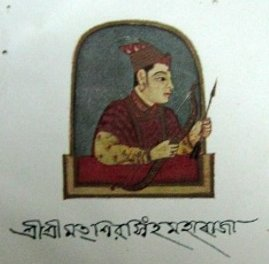
- Illustration from a manuscript, 18th century

Ahom King
- Reign: 27 August 1714 – 14 December 1744
- Coronation: 27 August 1714
- Predecessor: Rudra Singha
- Successor: Pramatta Singha
- Regent: See list: Phuleshwari (1722–1731); Ambika (1732–1739); Sarbeswari (1739–1744)
- Born: Sivasagar
- Died: 14 December 1744; Ahom kingdom
- Spouse: Phuleshwari; Ambika; Sarbeswari
- Issue: Ugra Singha
Names
- Swarganripa Saumareswara Rajadhiraja Sri Sri Siva Singha Swarganarajayandeva
- House: Tungkhungia
- Dynasty: Ahom
- Father: Rudra Singha
- Mother: Keri Rajmao
- Religion: Hinduism (Shaktism)
- Royal Seal

Siva Singha (died 14 December 1744), also known as Sutanpha, was Ahom King from 1714 until his death in 1744.

Siva Singha was the eldest son of his predecessor Rudra Singha. His reign was largely peaceful, and noted by the influence of his Consorts, Phuleswari, Ambika and Sarbeswari. After his death, he was succeeded by his younger brother, Pramatta Singha.

== Reign ==
=== Accession to the throne ===
As per the death bed injunction of Rudra Singha, he was succeeded by his eldest son. Siva Singha ascended the throne on the 20th day of Magh, and assumed the Ahom name Sutanphaa and the Hindu name of Siva Singha.

=== Activities ===
He gave up Rudra Singha's plan to organize a confederacy of the rajas of Hindustan and to invade Bengal (Mughal Empire), but obeyed his father's injunction to become a disciple of Krishnaram Bhattacharjya (Nyayavagish), the Shakta priest from nearby Nabadwip in present-day West Bengal. He gave the management of the Kamakhya Temple to Krishnaram, who came to be known as Parbatiya Gosain, as his residence was on top of the Nilachal hill. Siva Singha accepted him as the royal priest and made a large number of land grants to temples and Brahmin priests.

Siva Singha is said to have established such an elaborate system of espionage during his reign that he had accurate information of everything that was done or spoken in the kingdom.

=== Dafla expedition ===
There was no war in his reign, except in January 1717 there was an expedition against the Daflas of the northern hills, who had again taken to raiding the plains people. After they had been reduced to submission, an embankment was constructed along the foot of the hills inhabited by them as protection against future raids.

=== Bar Rajas ===
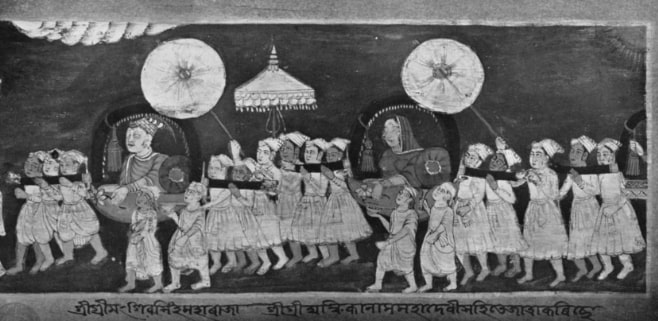
King Siva Singha and Queen Ambika riding in procession

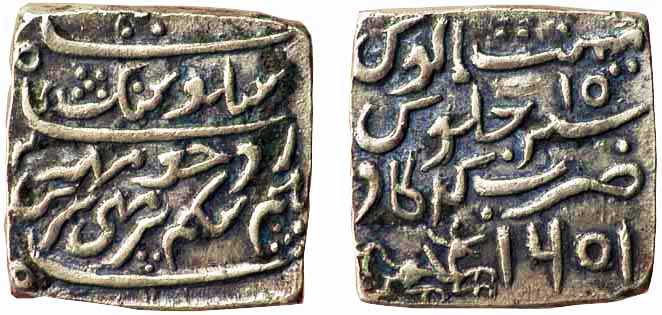
Coin of Siva Singha and Phuleshwari in Persian script. The legends read: obverse: Shivsingh shwah chickah jad chu mahar vaham begum pramatheswari shwah; sipithi (mudran gadgaon ১৫ basar, tarikh ১৬৫১)

Siba Singha was a staunch Shakta and was greatly influenced by the Brahmin priests and astrologers. In 1722, his spiritual guides and astrologers predicted that his rule would shortly come to end in near future, due to the consequences of chatra-bhanga-yoga. That he not only made many lavish presents to various temples and the Brahmins, in hope of conciliating the gods and averting the calamity but also endeavor to satisfy the alleged decree of fate by a subterfuge that greatly diminished his prestige in the eyes of his people. Therefore at the suggestion of Parvatiya Gosain, consented to endow his chief queen Phuleshwari, a Nat by caste (a caste of dancers), with the supreme vest, who assumed the name Pramatheswari and the title of Bar Raja.

Queen Phuleswari minted coins in the joint name of her and her husband where she used Persian legend, the first of its kind in Assam. Phuleswari was more under the influence of the Brahmins, particularly the Parvatiya Gosain than the king. It is believed that this was instigated by Gosain and in her zeal for Sakta Hinduism, she attempted to make Shaktism the State religion. With this objective, she ordered the Vaishnava Gosains to worship the goddess Durga. She then forbade the worship of other deities and personally supervised the act of desecration of the Sonarijan camp. Learning that the Sudra Mahantas were strong Vaishnavites and opposed animal sacrifice, she held a Durga puja in the capital Rangpur and forced Moamoria and several other Gosains to offer oblations to the goddess and smeared sacrificial blood on their foreheads. The Moamarias never forgave this insult to their spiritual leader and it became one of the prime reasons that they broke out in an open rebellion about half a century later, which came to be known as the Moamoria rebellion.

Phuleshwari in 1731 died while giving birth.

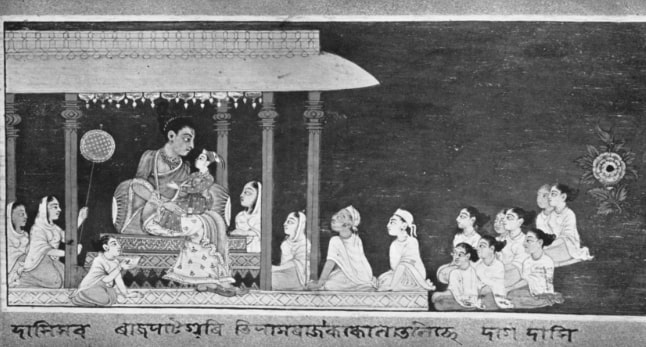
Bar Raja Ambika in court, sitting on her lap the Tipam Raja

The king then married her sister Draupadi, and made her the Bar Raja, after which she assumed the name of Ambika. Ambika had constructed the famous Sivasagar Siva doul, at her patronage, the famous manuscript on elephantry Hastividyarnava was composed. She died in 1738. Then Siva Singha married Endari, or Akari-Gabharu, whom he made the Bar Raja under the name Sarbeswari. The two successors of Phuleshwari, Ambika and Sarbeswari wielded the same authority and power as her, but were however not as energetic as their predecessor in patronizing Saktism.

=== Religious proclivities ===
Siva Singha with his Army

It was during his reign that Hinduism became the predominant religion among Ahoms, and those who persisted in holding old tribal beliefs and customs came to be regarded as a separate degraded class.

He made numerous temples and made large-number of land grants to Brahmanas, so that out of 48 copper plates recording land grants by all Ahom kings 19 of them belonged to him. He made an attempt to use Saktism as an counterforce against the growing power of Vaisnava Satras. Alongside he made support, provisions of Paiks, and land grants to the Brahman Satras as well.

Believed to have been built by the Ahom King, Siba Singha (1718-1744) Balilecha Kali Mandir at Ballilesha village is a living Sakti Peeth. There is an 18th inch high statute of Kali made of Asta Dhatu inside the temple. Though there were also Bishnu Doul and Shiva Daul, the carthquake of 1897 almost destroyed them. A Kali Pukhuri covering 8 Pura of land however still exists. It is situated in a beautiful location on river bank of Pagaldia about 7 km away south-east of Nalbari town.

=== Art and literature ===
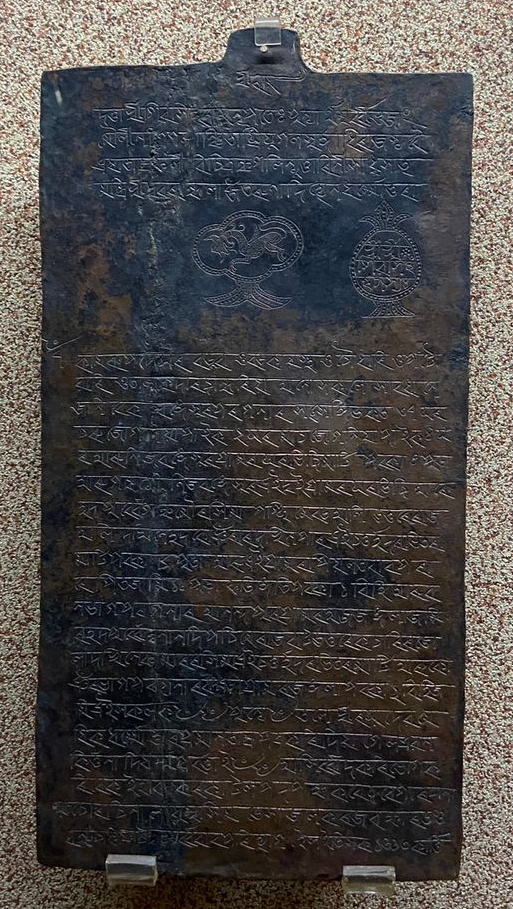
Copper plate inscription mentioning the supply of Paiks

Siva Singha was a great patron of literature and music. His reign is considered the golden era of Assamese manuscripts, many notable manuscripts were written one of which was the Hastividyarnava which received royal patronage. Foreign musicians were invited into his country to instruct his own and the Monarch became the author of a large collection of pious songs.

== Gallery ==
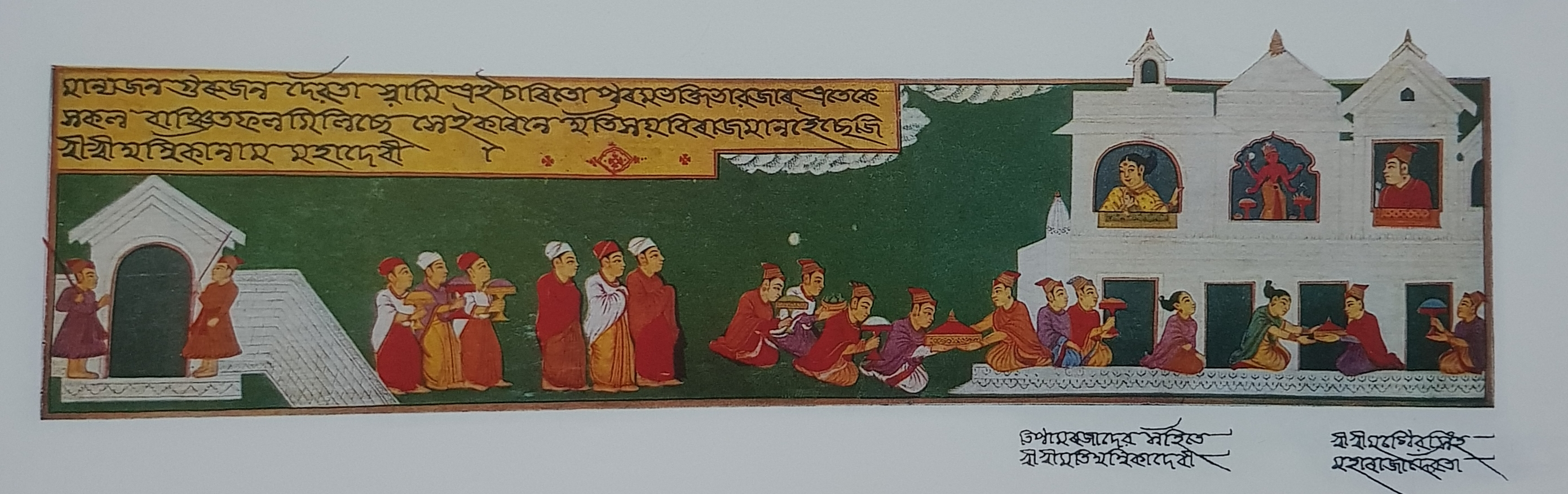
Court depiction

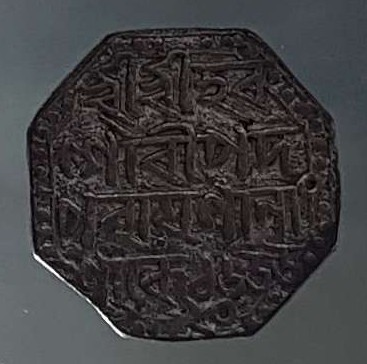
Full-rupee, inscribing Siva Singha and Ambika

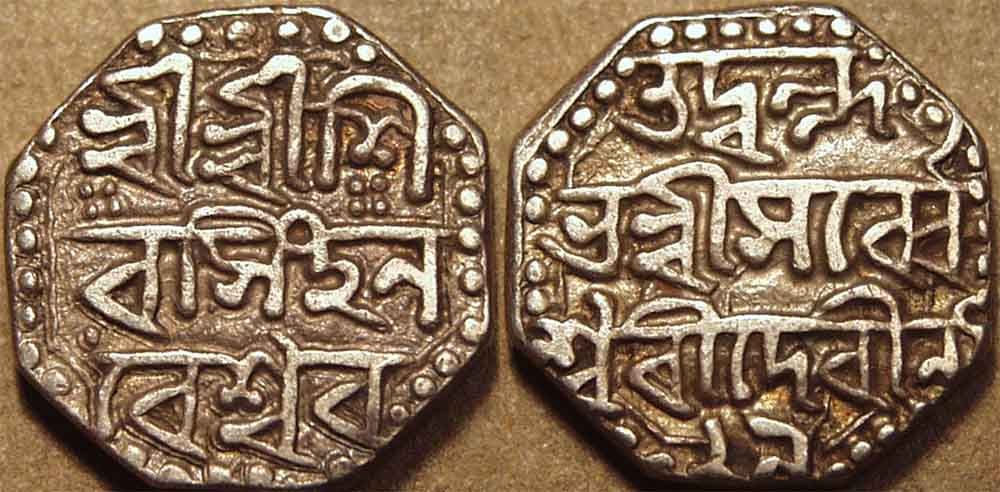
Half-Rupee, inscribing Siva Singha and Bar Raja Sarbeswari

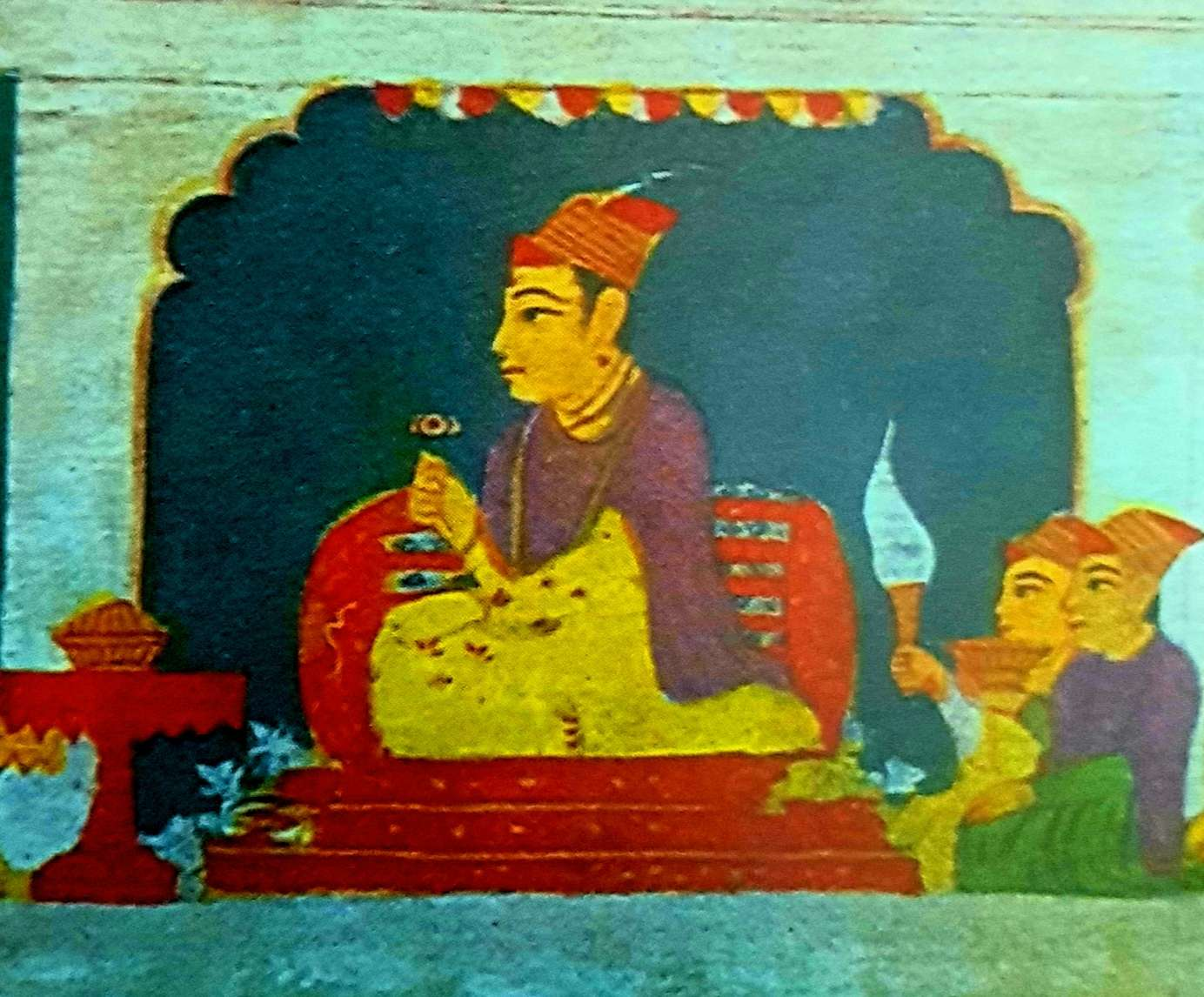
King Siva Singha

== See also ==
- Ahom dynasty
- Ahom kingdom
- Phuleshwari
- Moamoria rebellion
