= Sibsagar Town railway station =

Railway station in Assam, India

Sibsagar Town

General information
- Location: Station Road, Near ONGC Colony, Sivasagar, Assam; India
- Coordinates: 26°59′24″N 94°38′28″E
- Elevation: 130 metres (430 ft)
- System: Indian Railways station
- Owner: Indian Railways
- Operator: Northeast Frontier Railway
- Lines: Lumding–Dibrugarh section Jorhat Town - Sibsagar Town section
- Platforms: 1
- Tracks: 2

Construction
- Structure type: Standard on ground
- Parking: Yes
- Cycle facilities: Yes

Other information
- Status: Active
- Station code: SRTN
- Zone(s): Northeast Frontier Railway
- Division(s): Tinsukia
Location
- Location within Assam Location within India

Sivasagar Town railway station is a railway station on the Lumding–Dibrugarh section. It is located in Sivasagar in the Indian state of Assam. Its code is SRTN. It serves Sibsagar town. The station consists of one platform.

Survey for 344 km (214 mi)-long new line from Jorhat to Sivasagar was completed in 2010–11.

== Trains ==
The following trains stop at Sibsagar Town:

- 05915/05916 Simaluguri - Dibrugarh Town Passenger Special
- 55909/55910 Simaluguri - Dibrugarh Town Passenger
- 15641/15642 Barak–Brahmaputra Express
- 15669/15670 Guwahati–Dibrugarh Town Nagaland Express
- 15927/15928 Rangiya–New Tinsukia Express
- 22501/22502 New Tinsukia–SMVT Bengaluru Superfast Express
- 20503/20504 Dibrugarh-New Delhi Rajdhani Express

== See also ==
- Simaluguri Junction railway station
