= Ugra Singha, Tipam Raja =

Ahom Prince

Ugra Singha
- Tipam Raja
- Ugra Singha, sitting in his mother's lap, 1735
- House: Tungkhungia
- Dynasty: Ahom
- Father: Siva Singha
- Mother: Ambika

Ugra Singha, Tipam Raja was an Ahom Prince and claimant to the Ahom throne. A member of the Ahom dynasty and its cadet branch the Tungkhungia line, he was the son of king Siva Singha and Ambika, Bar Raja.

== Ancestry and family ==
Ugra Singha was the son of Siva Singha and Ambika, Bar Raja. He was a descendant of the Tungkhungia branch of Ahom kings, and was the grandson of Rudra Singha.

His parents commissioned the Dharma Purana in 1735, and it says that even as a child, Ugra Singha, demonstrated good judgment and impressed others around him.

== Attempt to seize the throne (1744) ==
=== Succession issue ===
After the death of his father Siva Singha in 1744, there was a question of the succession to the throne. Ugra Singha was one candidate, while his father's younger brother the Charing Raja, was another. The succession dispute was complicated since Siva Singha had inherited the throne from his father, Rudra Singha, but Rudra Singha had reportedly expressed his desire that all his sons would take the throne one after another.

=== Support for Ugra Singha ===
Two of the three great Dangariyas, Kalugayan Barpatragohain and Dihingia Bargohain, supported Ugra Singha in his claim to the throne. He was also supported by Dihingia Noabichia Phukan.

The opposing faction that supported the Charing Raja was led by Pukhuriparia Burhagohain, and supported by Bakatial Barbarua and other officials.

=== Palace Coup ===
Ugra Singha gathered members of the royal household along with palace attendants to support his claim; the men were armed with swords, daos, shields, spears, bows and arrows.

There wad an altercation between Ugra Singha and the Charing Raja, but the influence of officials including Chengmung Burhagohain meant that the supporters of Ugra Singha were defeated, and Pramatta Singha became king.

=== Defeat and aftermath ===
After his defeat, the supporters of Ugra Singha were punished. The Kalugayan Barpatragohain was dismissed and replaced by his son, while the Dihingia Bargohain was replaced by Khamchang Gohain, son of Laithepena Bargohain.

== Later life ==
After the failed coup, Sonai Burhagohain advised Pramatta Singha to not cast aside Ugra Singha, and instead show him affection and kindness as he would a son.
