= Phuleshwari =

Consort of Ahom King Siva Singha

Bar Raja Phuleshwari
- Reign: 1722-1731
- Predecessor: Position established
- Successor: Bar Raja Ambika
- Born: Ahom Kingdom
- Died: 1731; Ahom Kingdom
- Spouse: Siva Singha
Names
- Sri Sri Swarganarayani Prasiddha Brihadratta Pramatheswari

Phuleswari, also known as Pramateswari Devi, was the chief consort of an Ahom king Siva Singha of Ahom kingdom of what is now Assam who ruled the kingdom from 1722 to 1731 A.D. She was the first queen of Ahom kingdom to govern the kingdom directly. She was originally a dancer in a religious temple dedicated to the Hindu God Shiva. When the king saw her, he was captivated by her beauty and decided to marry her and made her his chief consort. Phuleswari after having assumed the title of Bor Raja, coins were minted on her, alongside her husband.

== Bar raja ==
=== Birth ===
Phuleshwari was born in the Kalugaon Gayan Gaon in Sivasagar district. Phuleshwari's original name was Phulmati. She was born in the Nat caste, a caste of dancers.

=== Reign ===
Captivated by her beauty the king married her and made her the chief consort and name. She was made the Bor Raja by Siva Singha after having declared chatra-bhanga-yoga which means the end of his reign by astrologers, in other to avert this he made Phuleswari the chief regent and gave the title of Bor Raja (Great king), and gave the name of Pramateswari, a name of Goddness Durga. Phuleshwari actually took the reins of government to her hands and meddled too much on the matter of region and customs, Phuleshwari was more under the influence of the Brahmanas, particularly the Parvatiya Gosain, she attempted to make Saktism the state religion. To execute her plan, she summoned the Shudra Mahantas to the Durga Puja held in Sakta shrine and compelled them to bow their heads before the gooddness, have their forehead besmeared with the blood of sacrificed animal and made them accept nirmali and prasad. The Mahantas considered it as a grave insult not to be forgiven, he decided to take vengeance at an opportune moment, which later caused a key factor for the Moamoria rebellion. And in her consuming zeal of a neophyte for Sakti Hinduism, she declared Shaktism as the state's official religion.

=== Death ===
Queen Phuleswari remained in the position of Bar Raja from 1722 till her death in the year 1731. She was given a Maidam against her own will by Siva Singha according to Ahom rites.

=== Civil works ===
Phuleshwari was a great patron of Sanskrit, had started a Sanskrit school within the campus and art and culture. She made her younger brother Harinath first Borgohain and then Borpatra Gohain, and posted many of her relative into high offices. Her brother Hairnath Borpatragohain had excavated the Lakshmi Sagar, and constructed temples on its bank. Her uncle Joyananda was made the Dhekial Barua, and three other of her relatives are made the Khanikar Barua, Chaudang Barua and Devi Ghar barua.

- Phuleshwari had excavated the Gaurisagar tank, and had constructed three temples dedicated to Shiva, Devi and, Vishnu.
