= Sivasagar =

Temple City of Assam, India

- City
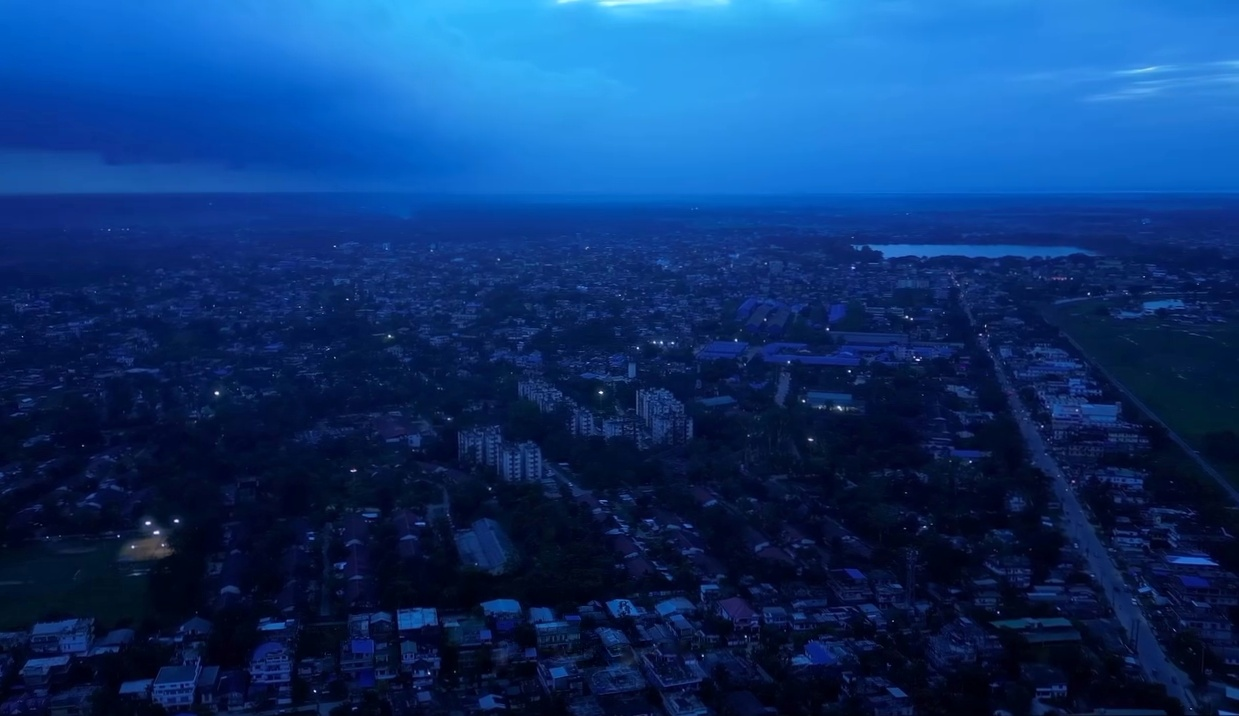
- Sivasagar Night View

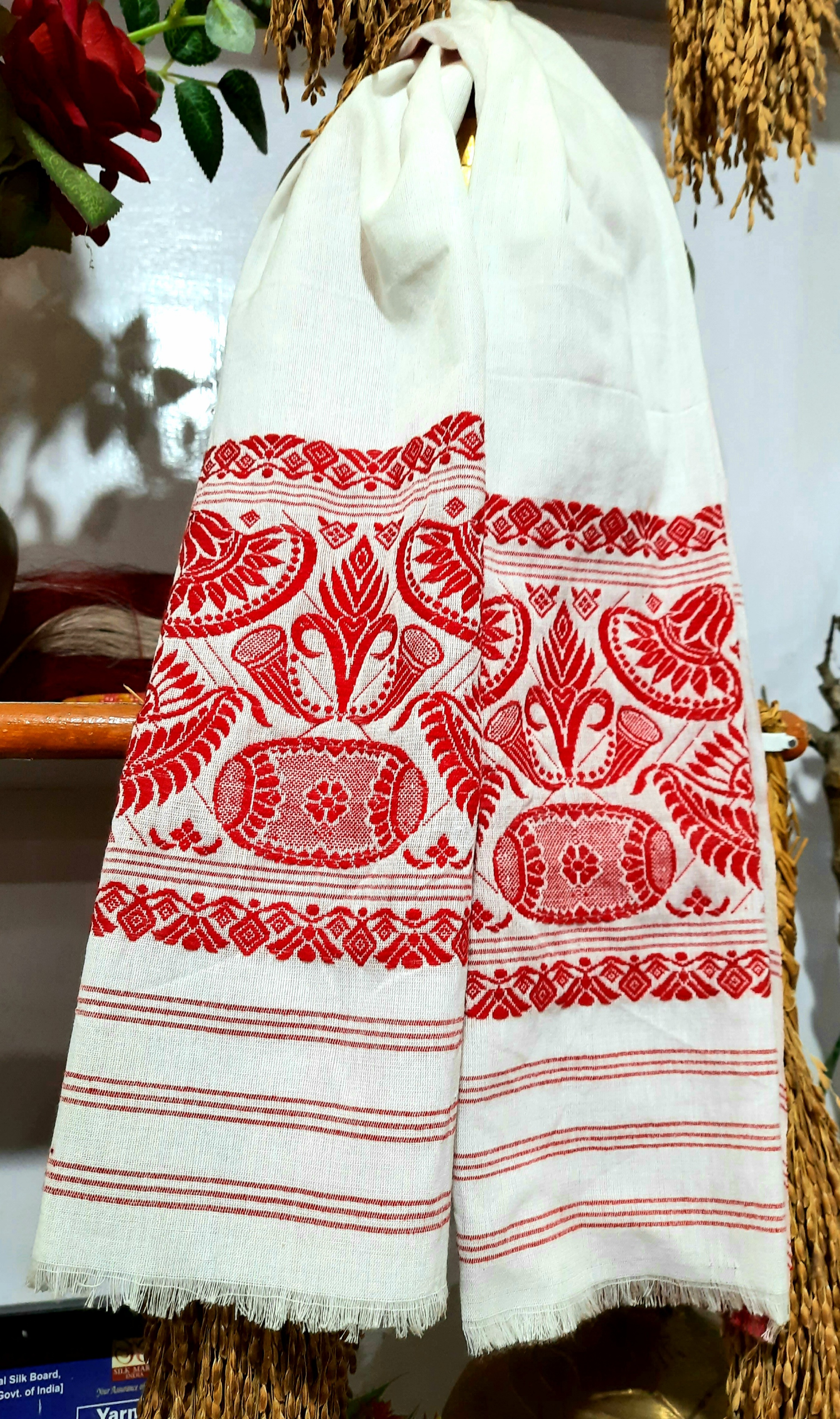
- Flag

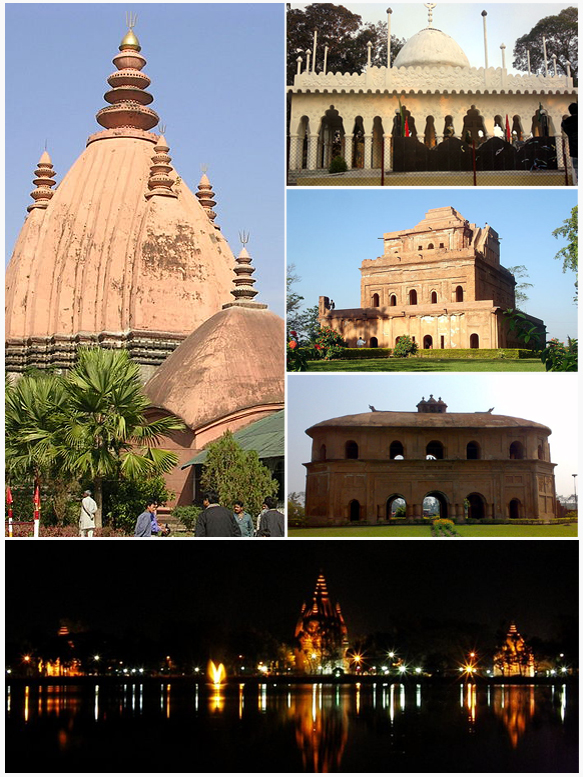

- Location in Assam, India Sivasagar (India)
- Coordinates: 26.9889°N 94.639°E
- Country: India
- State: Assam
- District: Sivasagar

Government
  - Type: Municipal Corporation
  - Body: Sivasagar Municipal Corporation

Area
  - Total: 86 km^{2} (33 sq mi)
- Elevation: 95 m (312 ft)

Population (2025)
  - Total: 293,871
  - Density: 3,400/km^{2} (8,900/sq mi)
- Demonym: Sivasagarian

Languages
  - Official: Assamese
- Time zone: UTC+5:30 (IST)
- PIN: 785640
- Telephone code: 91-3772
- ISO 3166 code: IN-AS
- Vehicle registration: AS 04
- Nearest major city: Nazira, Dibrugarh, Jorhat
- Website: sivasagar.assam.gov.in

Sivasagar (Assamese: [xi.βɔ.xaɡɔ(ɹ)]) is a city and headquarter of the Sivasagar district, Assam. It is known for its Ahom palaces and monuments. Sivasagar is an important centre for tea and oil industries today.

== Etymology ==
It is said that the original name of Sivasagar was - 'Kalansupar' after the name of 'Kalansu Gohain' who resided in a village that originally existed in the place where currently the Sivasagar tank is located. In the year 1733, the Ahom queen Ambika Devi dug a tank at the Ahom capital Rangpur, covering a area of 257 acres. The place came to be known as Sivpore (Sivpur) being associated with the Siva temple (Siva Dol) built on the bank of this tank. Then with the passage-of time, the name Sibsagar was formed.

== History ==
Sivasagar, formerly known as Rangpur, was the capital of the Ahom Kingdom from 1699 to 1788. The Ahoms ruled Assam for six centuries until their kingdom fell to the Burmese Konbaung dynasty in 1819 and their ruling class was all but wiped out.

During the reign of Gaurinath Singha (1780–1795), a battle was fought against the Moamoria rebels in the vicinity of the Sivasagar tank.

The province was conquered by the British in 1825 and was completely annexed in 1826. For administrative purposes, it was divided into three sub-divisions.

== Geography ==
Sivasagar is located at 26.9889°N 94.639°E. It has an average elevation of 86.6 meters above sea level.

== Climate ==
Sivasagar has been ranked 27th best "National Clean Air City" under (Category 3 population under 3 lakhs cities) in India.

== Demographics ==
Historical population
Year	Pop.	±%
1951	73,622	—
1961	106,967	+45.3%
1971	121,500	+13.6%
1981	197,980	+62.9%
1991	239,237	+20.8%
2001	270,579	+13.1%
2011	283,190	+4.7%
2021	293,871	+3.8%
Source: Census of India

According to the 2011 census Sivasagar has a population of 1,151,050. The City has a population density of 720 inhabitants per square kilometre (1,900/sq mi). Its population growth rate over the decade 2001-2011 was 77.7%. Sivasagar has a sex ratio of 954 females for every 1000 males, and a literacy rate of 81.36%.

Religions in Sivasagar district (2011)
Religion	Percent
Hinduism	87.17%
Islam	10.88%
Christianity	1.24%
Other or not stated	0.71%

In the residual district Hindus are 592,433 (87.17%), Muslims are 73,961 (10.88%), Christians 8,433 (1.24%). There are also a few villages of Buddhist tribes like Khamyang and Turung people. Moreover, there is a small population of Tiwas, Konyak, Meitei and Nocte living in certain parts of the district. Many Rajasthani families are also present in Sivasagar City.

Languages of Sivasagar district (2011)
1. Assamese (90.2%)
2. Mishing (2.78%)
3. Hindi (1.96%)
4. Bengali (1.58%)
5. Sadri (1.38%)
6. Others (2.06%)

Sivasagar is an overwhelming Assamese majority district. At the time of the 2011 census, 90.24% of the population spoke Assamese, 2.78% Mishing, 1.96% Hindi, 1.58% Bengali and 1.38% Sadri as their first language.

== Administration ==
=== District Court ===
In the year 1984, a separate Civil District of Sivasagar was declared, and in the year 1985, the District Judiciary was set up.

In the year 1983, C.J.M. court was opened at Sivasagar. Subsequently in 1984, the court of Sub-Divisional Judicial Magistrate, Charaideo, Sonari was established. In 1987, the Civil Judge & Asstt. Sessions Judge, Sivasagar was opened. From 2001 the Addl. District & Sessions Judge (F.T.C) begin functioning. The Sub-Divisional Judicial Magistrate Court(M), Nazira begin functioning from 24 July 2014. As per order of the Hon'ble Gauhati High Court, the new Addl. District and Sessions Judge, Charaideo, Sonari begin functioning from the date of 09-02-2018. On 27-02-2021, Charaideo judicial courts separated from Sivasagar district. There are currently twelve Judicial Courts in Sivasagar District.

== Transport ==
=== Air ===
Jorhat Airport located at Jorhat, 75 km away from Sivasagar. Another option for getting here is via Dibrugarh Airport, located at a distance of 95 km from the city.

=== Rail ===
Sibsagar Town railway station serves the town. The nearest railway junction on the Lumding–Dibrugarh section of the Northeast Frontier Railways is Simaluguri Junction, 16 kilometers (9.9 mi) from Sivasagar. Buses ply regularly from Simaluguri towards Sivasagar. It is approximately a half-hour bus ride from Simaluguri town.

=== Road ===
Sivasagar is well connected by road with the rest of the state. The National Highway (NH-37) or the Assam Trunk Road runs through the district. State-run buses connect it to Guwahati, Dibrugarh, and Jorhat from the Assam State Transport Corporation's (ASTC) bus station in Sivasagar. Private buses are also available. Taxis are also available for hire. Auto-rickshaws and other modes of transport are available in and around the town. Cheaper modes of transport, like Tata Magic and Tempos, are available through Nazira, Mechagarh and Joysagar to Sivasagar.

== Education ==
Sivasagar is a hub for education in Upper Assam, with a range of schools, colleges, and universities offering various courses.

=== Colleges ===
- Sibsagar Commerce College
- Sivasagar Girl's College
- Bir Lachit Borphukan College
- Demow College
- Nazira College

=== Universities ===
- Sibsagar University

=== Technical Institute ===
- Rajiv Gandhi Institute of Petroleum Technology, Sivasagar Campus

=== Initiatives ===
The government has initiated various programs to improve education in Sivasagar, Sarva Shiksha Abhiyan (SSA) and Rashtriya Madhyamik Shiksha Abhiyan (RMSA).

These initiatives aim to improve infrastructure, teacher training, and student outcomes in Sivasagar.

== Politics ==
Sivasagar is a part of Jorhat (Lok Sabha constituency). Gaurav Gogoi of Indian National Congress is the current Member of Lok Sabha from the Jorhat Lok Sabha Constituency.

Akhil Gogoi of Raijor Dol is the incumbent MLA from Sivasagar assembly constituency.

== Notable people ==
- Dipali Barthakur, Assamese singer
- Jahnu Barua, film director
- Bhogeswar Baruah, former athlete and coach
- Parvati Prasad Baruva, poet
- Devananda Bharali, writer
- Devoleena Bhattacharjee, Indian TV actress
- Nakul Chandra Bhuyan, writer
- Bimala Prasad Chaliha, former Chief Minister
- Maniram Dewan, Freedom fighter
- Jatindra Nath Duwara, Assamese Poet
- Akhil Gogoi, MLA Sivasagar Constituency
- Amrita Gogoi, Assamese actress
- Lila Gogoi, historian
- Pranab Kumar Gogoi, politician
- Bhaskar Jyoti Mahanta, DGP of Assam police
- Dimbeswar Neog, writer
- Maheswar Neog, writer
- Manas Robin, musician
- Hiteswar Saikia, politician
- Imran Shah, writer
- Benudhar Sharma, writer
