= Devananda Bharali =

Indian writer & linguist (1883–1972)

- Born: June, 1883; Sivasagar district, Assam
- Died: June 1972
- Occupations: writer, linguistic
- Writing career
- Pen name: Miri
- Language: Assamese
- Genre: Literature

Devananda Bharali (1883-1972) was a pioneer linguist, writer, translator and dramatist from Assam. He also wrote many articles using the pen name of Miri. He was born in June, 1883 in Sivasagar district, Assam to Ishananda Bharali.

== Literary career ==
Bharali's writings are both in English and Assamese language. Some of his major works include:

- Asamiya bhashar moulik bicar aru sahityor chinaki (অসমীয়া ভাষাৰ মৌলিক বিচাৰ আৰু সাহিত্যৰ চিনাকি), published in 1912.,
- Assamese Grammar in English (1902),
- A Study of the Phonology and Vocabulary of Assamese Language (1960).
- Cīnā Luitaea pāre, pāre (1972)

He was a regular writer in the Assamese magazines like "Usha", "Banhi". He had translated the "Macbeth" of Shakespeare into Assamese language for the first time.

Bharali's dramatical works include:

- Bhimdarpa (ভীমদৰ্প), an abridged translation of Macbeth published in 1910
- Srimonto Sankar (শ্ৰীমন্ত শংকৰ) (1944)
- Bihu (বিহু)

== See also ==
- Assamese literature
- History of Assamese literature
- List of Asam Sahitya Sabha presidents
- List of Sahitya Akademi Award winners for Assamese
- List of Assamese-language poets
- List of Assamese writers with their pen names
