= Hayagriva Madhava Temple =

Hindu temple in India

Coordinates: 26.2427°N 91.5265°E

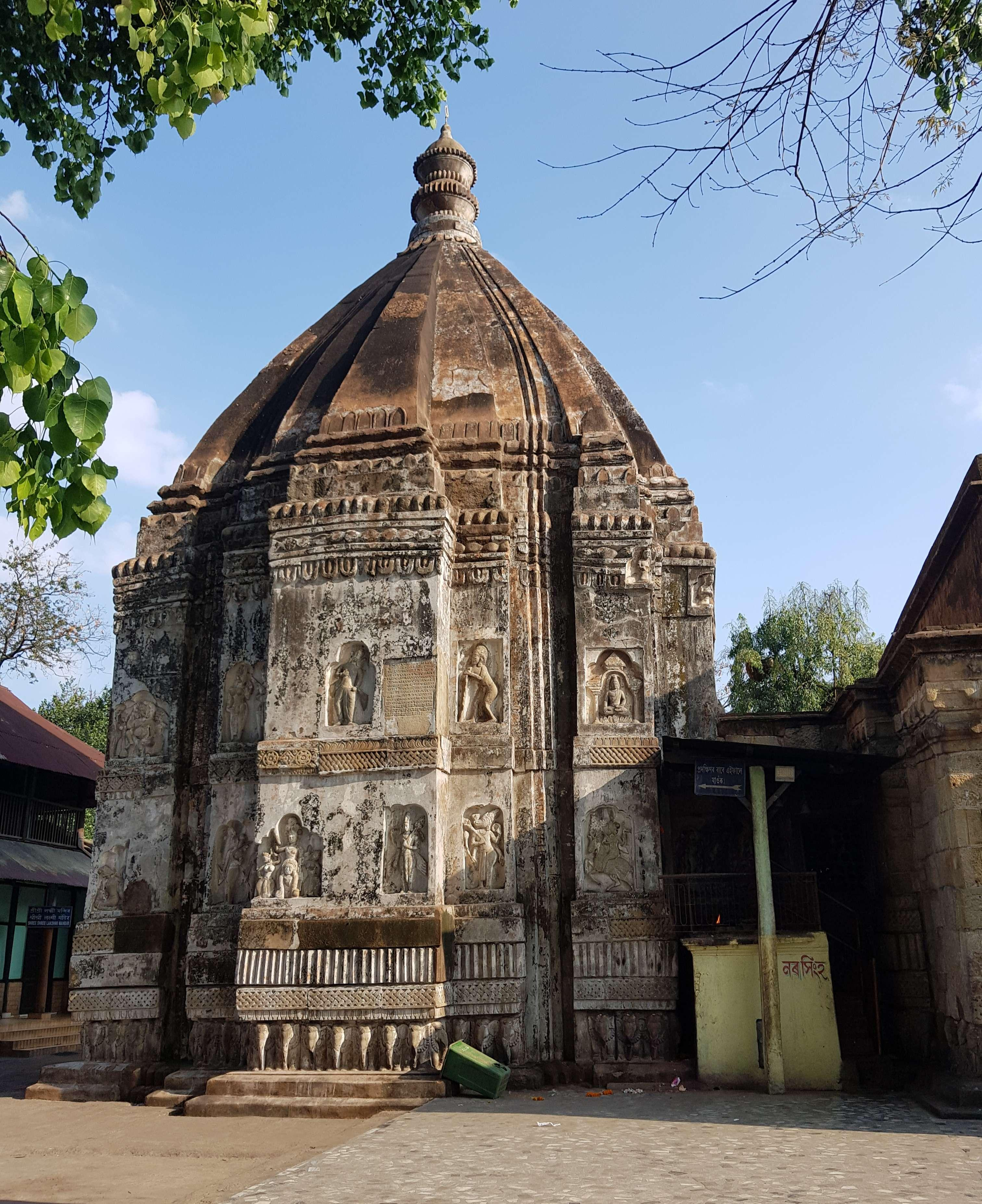
- Hayagriva Madhava Temple

Religion
- Affiliation: Hinduism
- District: Kamrup
- Deity: Vishnu as Hayagriva
- Festivals: Doul Utsav, Janmastami

Location
- Location: Hajo
- State: Assam
- Country: India
- Interactive map of Hayagriva Madhava Temple

Architecture
- Creator: Koch dynasty Constructed by: Raghudeva Narayan
- Completed: 1583; 443 years ago

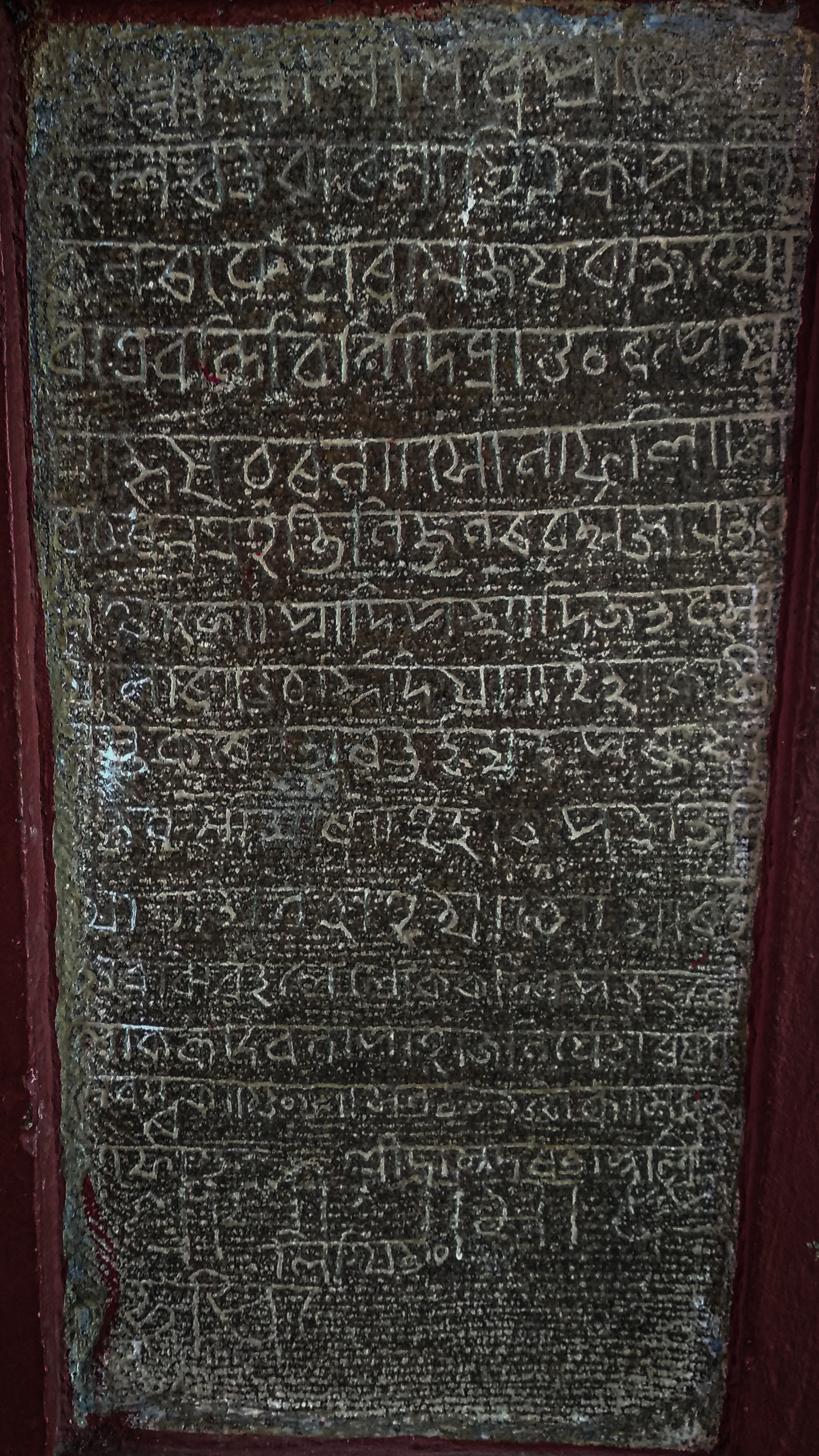
Inscription of the temple, issued by Raghudeva Narayan

Hayagriva Madhava Temple is situated on the Manikut hill. The hill is situated in Hajo of Kamrup District in Assam, India. Which is around 30 km to west of Guwahati.

A most striking feature of the temple is the continuous row of elephants carved on the lowest level of the temple walls - a structure akin to the stone cut temple of Ellora. The outer walls of the shrine is also covered with relief figures of the ten incarnations of Vishnu, devotees in procession and episodic scenes from the Ramayana and the Mahabharata. There is a big pond known as Madhab Pukhuri near the temple. Doul, Bihu and Janmastami festivals are celebrated every year in the temple.

The Sri Sri Hayagriva Madhab Mandir is an ancient and revered pilgrimage site situated atop the scenic Monikut Hill in Hajo, Kamrup District, Assam. Located about 30 km west of Guwahati,

Sayani, the first wife of Kalia Bhomora Borphukan donated a family of paiks and also a plot of land for their maintenance to the Hayagriva Madhava temple during the reign of Ahom king Kamaleswar Singha. The lamps in the sanctum sanctorum are never put off (akhanda deep) ever. Oil flows into the big earthen lamps through a simple tube connected to the oil tin.
