= Simaluguri Junction railway station =

Railway station in Assam, India

Simaluguri Junction

General information
- Location: Station Road, Near ONGC Colony, Sivasagar, Assam; India
- Coordinates: 26°55′01″N 94°45′07″E
- Elevation: 130 metres (430 ft)
- System: Indian Railways station
- Owner: Indian Railways
- Operator: Northeast Frontier Railway
- Line: Lumding–Dibrugarh section
- Platforms: 3
- Tracks: 5

Construction
- Structure type: Standard on ground
- Parking: Yes
- Cycle facilities: Yes

Other information
- Status: Active
- Station code: SLGR
- Zone(s): Northeast Frontier Railway
- Division(s): Tinsukia
Location
- Location within Assam Location within India

Simaluguri Junction railway station is a railway station on the Lumding–Dibrugarh section. It is located in Sivasagar in the Indian state of Assam. Its code is SLGR. It serves Simaluguri town. The station consists of three platforms. Simaluguri Junction is the main railway station in the Sivasagar district of Assam.

== History ==
The station lies on Amguri-Simaluguri section on West side, Simaluguri-Dibrugarh section in North and Simaluguri-Sripuriagaon section in East. All these lines come under the Lumding–Dibrugarh section. The Simaluguri-Naginimora section is undergoing Gauge Conversion. Once completed it will connect Sivasagar with Nagaland. Total length of the project is 16.9 kilometres.

Survey for 344 km (214 mi)-long new line from Jorhat to Sibsagar was completed in 2010–11 which will reduce the distance between Jorhat and Dibrugarh.

== See also ==
- Sibsagar Town railway station
