= Jhanji River =

River in India

Jhanji River Jaji River
- Location within Assam Location within India
- Native name: জাঁজী নদী (Assamese)

Location
- State: Assam
- District: Jorhat district & Sivasagar district

Physical characteristics
- Source: Mokokchung district
  - location: Nagaland
- Mouth: Brahmaputra River
  - location: Jhanjimukh, Sivasagar district, Assam
  - coordinates: 26°53′55.0″N 94°21′03.8″E

Basin features
- Progression: Jhanji river - Brahmaputra River

The Jhanji River (also known as Jaji river or Jhanzi river or Janji river) is a tributary of the Brahmaputra River in the Indian state of Assam. The Jhanji river originates in Mokokchung district of Nagaland.

The Jhanji river serves as the western boundary between Jorhat district and Sivasagar district of Assam and joins the Brahmaputra River at Jhanjimukh (Jhanji-mukh where mukh means mouth in Assamese language).
