= Sivasagar district =

District of Assam, India

Coordinates: 26°59′03.90″N 94°37′53.07″E

- District
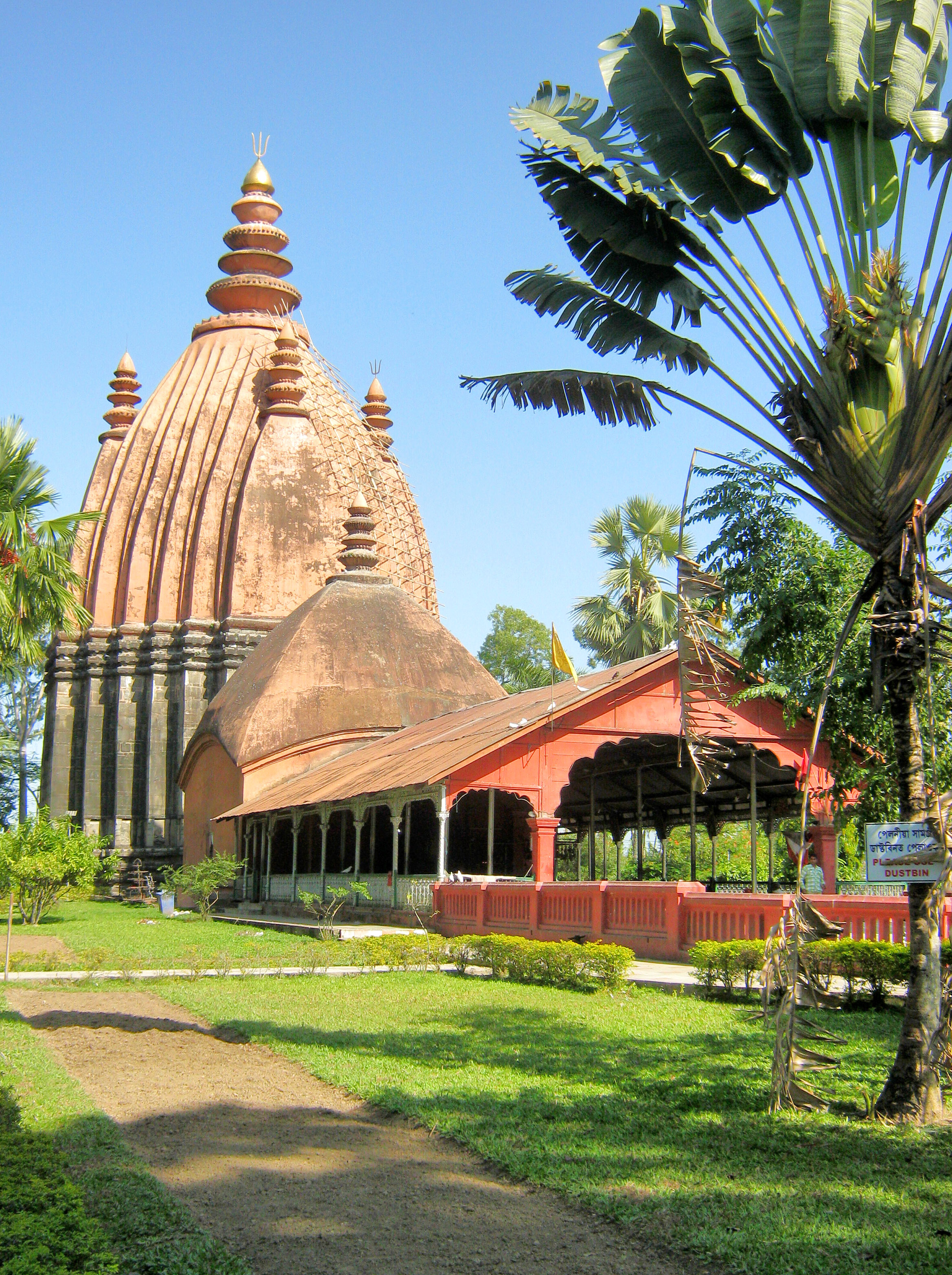
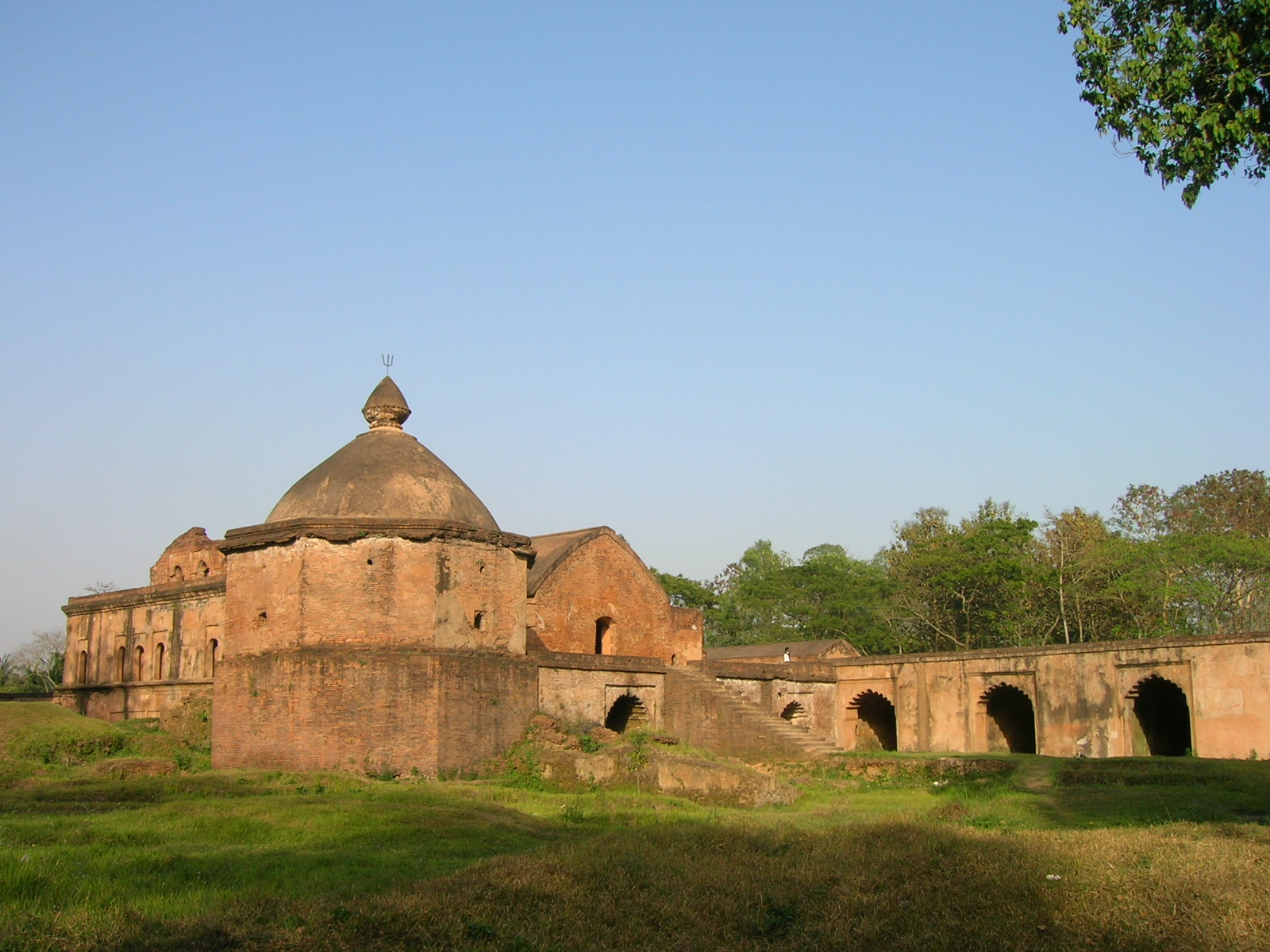
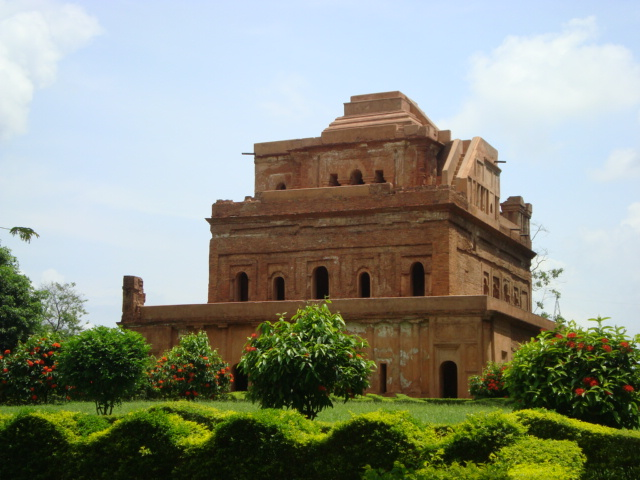
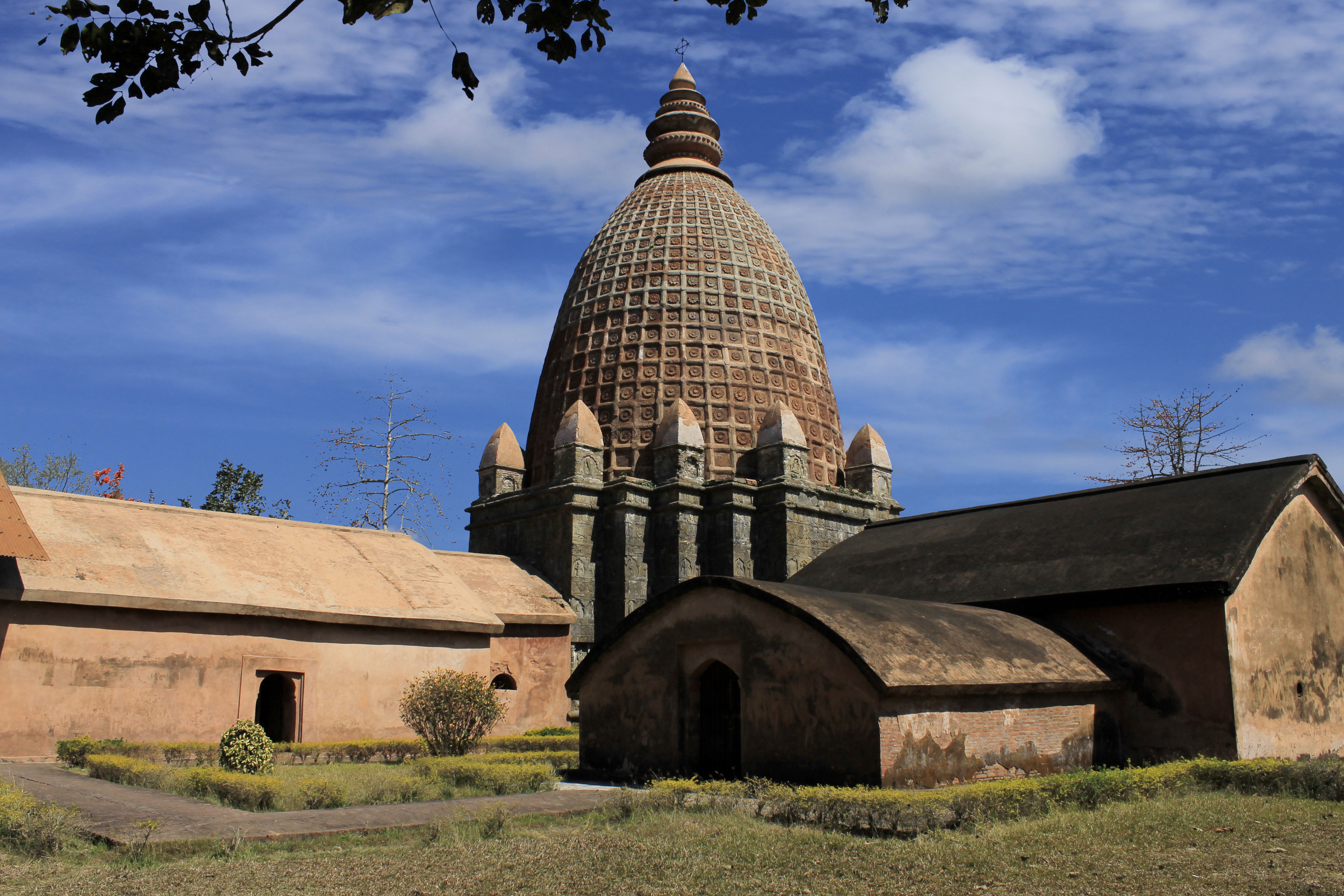
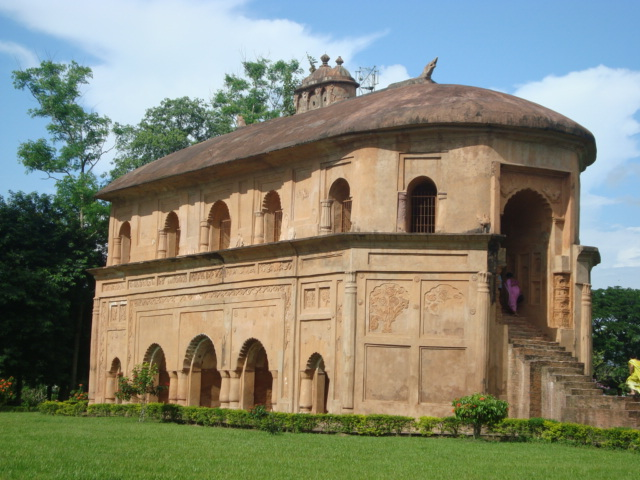
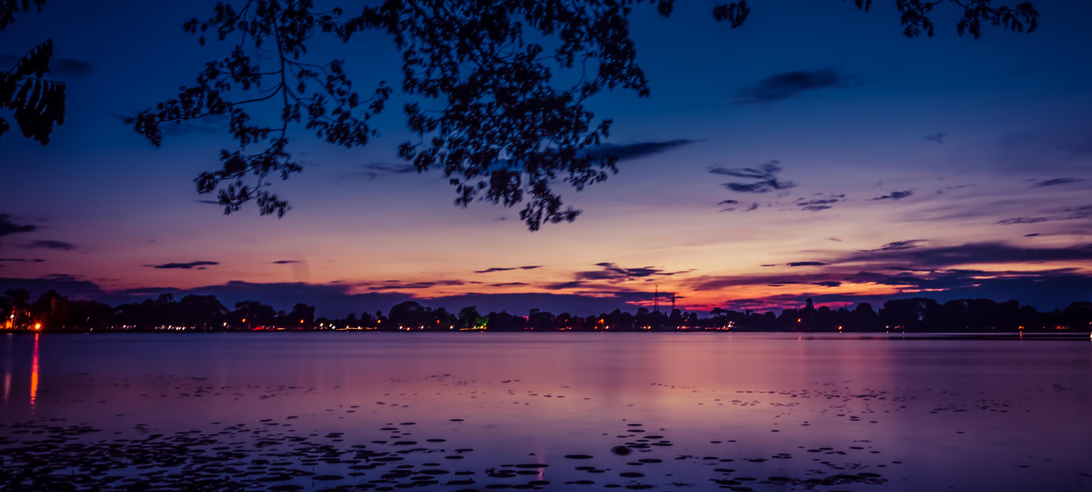
- From top, left to right: Sivasagar Sivadol, Talatal Ghar, Kareng Ghar, Joy dol, Rang Ghar, Sivasagar Tank (Borpukhuri)

- Location in Assam
- Country: India
- State: Assam
- Division: Upper Assam
- Headquarters: Sivasagar
- Tehsils: 1. Amguri 2. Gaurisagar 3. Sivasagar 4. Demow 5. Nazira 6. Lakowa

Government
  - Lok Sabha constituencies: 1. Jorhat
  - Vidhan Sabha constituencies: Amguri, Nazira, Thowra, Sibsagar

Area
  - Total: 1,599 km^{2} (617 sq mi)

Population (2011)
  - Total: 679,632
  - Density: 425.0/km^{2} (1,101/sq mi)

Demographics
  - Literacy: 81.36%
  - Sex ratio: 951 per 1000 male
- Time zone: UTC+05:30 (IST)
- Major highways: NH-37
- Website: sivasagar.assam.gov.in

Sivasagar district (Pron: /ˈsɪvəˌsʌɡər/ or /ˈʃɪvəˌsʌɡər/) is one of the 34 districts of Assam state in Northeast India. Sivasagar city is the administrative headquarters of this district. This historic place is also known for its rich biodiversity. The districts covers an area of 2668 square kilometers (of the total area of 78438 square kilometers of Assam). The district comprises two sub-divisions – Sivasagar and Nazira. The district is bounded by the Brahmaputra River to the north, Nagaland to the south, the Charaideo district to the east and the Jhanji River to the west.

== History ==
Until the early 16th century, the land within the Sibsagar district was part of three kingdoms viz. Ahom kingdom, Chutia kingdom and Kachari kingdom. The Burhi-Dihing river which once flowed through the central region of Sibsagar formed the borders between Ahom and Chutia territories, while Dikhou on the southern region demarcated Kachari and Ahom territories. In early 16th century, Ahoms under the reign of Suhungmung defeated Chutia first and Kachari later to annex the entire district.

Before the British period, the center of administration of Assam was around Sivasagar were the famous Ahoms ruled for nearly six hundred years. The Ahom kings took keen interest in building different temples, dedicated to various deities and which were usually flanked by large tanks which until today stand out as memorials to their glory in the district. Sivasagar, or Rangpur as it was known then, was the capital of the Ahom Kingdom from 1699 to 1788. The famous Joysagar Tank was excavated within 45 days by Rudra Singha (1696-1714) in memory of his mother Joymoti Konwari. The Joy Dol is situated on the bank of the Joysagar Tank. Pramatta Singha (1744-1751) built the Rang Ghar with bricks in 1745. Gaurisagar Tank is situated at a distance of about eight miles from Sivasagar town. The Sivasagar Tank was excavated by queen Ambika Devi in 1733. The Siva Dol, Vishnu Dol and Devi Dol are situated on the bank of the Sivasagar Tank. Rajeshwar Singha (1751-1769) built the Kareng Ghar in Gargaon. Charaideo, about 28 kilometers away from Sivasagar is famous for a cluster of Maidams, the Ahom age tumuli. Sukapha, the first Ahom king, constructed his capital at Charaideo in 1253. Sivasagar was earlier known as Rangpur and Rangpur was earlier known as Meteka. The original name of Sivasagar district was Sibpur.

On February 24, 1826, the treaty of Yandaboo consolidated the British occupation of Assam. This treaty of Yandaboo brought an end to the roughly six hundred year long Ahom rule in Assam. After the 1826 treaty, the British government in Assam incorporated a number of administrative changes such as the formation of districts. The Sivasagar district was created after the annexation of Purandar Singha's dominion of upper Assam in 1839. The Sadar headquarter of Sivasagar was transferred to Jorhat in 1912–13. The undivided old Sivasagar district comprised three subdivisions, namely Sivasagar, Jorhat and Golaghat. In 1983, the Sivasagar district was reorganized to carve out the Jorhat district. It was further divided on 15 August 1987 for the creation of the Golaghat district.

== Geography ==
One of the quaintest towns of Eastern Assam, Sivasagar is one of the cleanest towns in Assam. The district is situated between 26.45° and 27.15° North latitudes and 94.25° and 95.25° East longitudes. Sivasagar district occupies an area of 2,668 square kilometres (1,030 sq mi), comparatively equivalent to Estonia's Saaremaa Island.

The Sivasagar district is bordered by the Naga Hills and Arunachal Pradesh in the south and south-east respectively and the Brahmaputra river in the north. The district is mostly flat alluvial plain with hillocks on south-eastern and southern areas near the Nagaland border.

== Economy ==
The main industries in Sivasagar are oil industry, tea industry & tourism industry. Majority of the population are agrarian.

== Demographics ==
Historical Sivasagar District population
Year	Pop.	±%
1951	45,000	—
1961	138,000	+206.7%
1971	203,000	+47.1%
1981	348,000	+71.4%
1991	591,000	+69.8%
2001	818,809	+38.5%
2011	1,151,050	+17.5%
2021	1,195,000	+17.9%

According2011 census Sivasagar district has a population of 1,151,050, roughly equal to the population of East Timor. This gives it a ranking of 406th in India (out of a total of 640). The district has a population density of 431 inhabitants per square kilometre (1,120/sq mi). Its population growth rate over the decade 2001-2011 was 9.37%. Sivasagar has a sex ratio of 954 females for every 1000 males, and a literacy rate of 81.36%.

After bifurcation Sivasagar district has a population of 679,632, of which 80,373 (11.83%) live in urban areas. The residual district has a sex ratio of 952 females per 1000 males. Scheduled Castes and Scheduled Tribes make up 34,704 (5.11%) and 37,130 (5.46%) of the population respectively.

Religions in Sivasagar district (2011)
Religion	Percent
Hinduism	87.17%
Islam	10.88%
Christianity	1.24%
Other or not stated	0.71%

In the residual district Hindus are 592,433 (87.17%), Muslims are 73,961 (10.88%), Christians 8,433 (1.24%). There are also a few villages of Buddhist tribes like Khamyang and Turung people. Moreover, there is a small population of Tiwas, Konyak, Meitei and Nocte living in certain parts of the district. Many Rajasthani families are also present in Sivasagar district

Languages of Sivasagar district (2011)
1. Assamese (90.2%)
2. Mishing (2.78%)
3. Hindi (1.96%)
4. Bengali (1.58%)
5. Sadri (1.38%)
6. Others (2.06%)

Sivasagar is an overwhelming assamese majority district. At the time of the 2011 census, 90.24% of the population spoke Assamese, 2.78% Mishing, 1.96% Hindi, 1.58% Bengali and 1.38% Sadri as their first language.

== Flora and fauna ==
In 1999, Sivasagar district became home to the Pani Dihing Wildlife Sanctuary, which has an area of 34 km^{2} (13.1 mi^{2}). There are also many reserve forests like Abhaypur, Dilli, Diroi, Geleky and Saleh. There are some unclassified forests along the Nagaland and Arunachal border. The vegetation is mostly tropical evergreen with trees like hollong, titachapa, nahor, mekai etc. dominating the canopy. The district is also rich in fauna. Various rare and endangered mammals like tiger, elephant, sun bear, sambar, hoolock gibbon are found in the reserve forests.

== Festivals and fairs ==
The Bihus are the most popular agricultural festival in the district. The Bohag Bihu/Rongali Bihu marks the advent of the cropping season, the Magh Bihu is the harvest festival and the Kati Bihu held in the lean period of agriculture is marked by the observing of penance and prayer. The Vaishnav community observes the birth and death anniversaries of the prominent Vaishnava saints of the state. Tribal communities like the Mishings and Deoris also perform Bihu in their own styles. Id-ul-Zuha and Id-ul-fitr are religious festivals of the Muslim community. Other Hindu festivals observed in the district are Ambubashi, Durga Puja and Sivaratri . The Sivaratri Mela of Siva Dol in Sivasagar town has been observed since the days of Ahom rule. The Tea tribes maintain their own rich cultural traditions. The Jhumur dance and traditional music of these communities are very popular.

=== Sivasagar Day ===
The Sivasagar District celebrates Sivasagar Day on July the 1st of every year. The day is celebrated with cultural programs and cultural rallies along with plantation programmes in the entire Sivasagar District.

== See also ==
- Matak Autonomous Council

== Bibliography ==
- Phukan, J. N. (1991). "Relations of the Ahom kings of Assam with those of Mong Mao (in Yunnan, China) and of Mong Kwang (Mogaung in Myanmar)". Proceedings of the Indian History Congress. 52: 888–893. ISSN 2249-1937. JSTOR 44142722.
- Scott, James George (1967), Hsenwi State Chronicle
