= Rani Kamalapati–Agartala Weekly Express =

Train in India

Rani Kamalapati - Agartala Weekly Express

Overview
- Service type: Express
- Status: Active
- Locale: Madhya Pradesh, Uttar Pradesh, Bihar, West Bengal, Assam and Tripura
- First service: 22 October 2026; 43 days' time
- Current operator: West Central (WCR)

Route
- Termini: Rani Kamalapati (RKMP); Agartala (AGTL)
- Stops: 40
- Distance travelled: 2,482 km (1,542 mi)
- Average journey time: 52h 05m
- Service frequency: Weekly
- Train number: 11665 / 11666

On-board services
- Classes: General Unreserved, Sleeper Class, AC 3rd Class Economy, AC 3rd Class, AC 2nd Class
- Seating arrangements: Yes
- Sleeping arrangements: Yes
- Catering facilities: Pantry Car; On-board Catering; E-Catering
- Observation facilities: Large windows
- Baggage facilities: No
- Other facilities: Below the seats

Technical
- Rolling stock: LHB coach
- Track gauge: 1,676 mm (5 ft 6 in)
- Electrification: 25 kV 50 Hz AC overhead line
- Operating speed: 130 km/h (81 mph) maximum, 48 km/h (30 mph) average including halts.
- Track owner: Indian Railways

The 11665 / 11666 Rani Kamalapati–Agartala Weekly Express is an express train belonging to West Central Railway zone that runs between the city Rani Kamalapati of Madhya Pradesh and Agartala of Tripura in India.

It operates as train number 11665 from Rani Kamalapati to Agartala and as train number 11666 in the reverse direction, serving the states of Madhya Pradesh, Uttar Pradesh, Bihar, West Bengal, Assam and Tripura.

== Services ==
- 11665 / Rani Kamalapati–Agartala Weekly Express has an average speed of 48 km/h and covers 2482 km in 52h 05m.
- 11666 / Agartala–Rani Kamalapati Weekly Express has an average speed of 52 km/h and covers 2482 km in 47h 20m.

== Schedule ==
- 11665 – 03:20 PM (Thursday) [Rani Kamalapati]
- 11666 – 05:20 PM (Sunday) [Agartala]

== Routes and halts ==
The important halts of the train are :

- Rani Kamalapati
- Narmadapuram
- Itarsi Junction
- Pipariya
- Gadarwara
- Narsinghpur
- Jabalpur Junction
- Katni Junction
- Maihar
- Satna Junction
- Manikpur Junction
- Prayagraj Chheoki Junction
- Mirzapur
- Pt. Deen Dayal Upadhyaya Junction
- Buxar
- Ara Junction
- Danapur
- Patliputra Junction
- Hajipur Junction
- Barauni Junction
- Begusarai
- Khagaria Junction
- Naugachia
- Katihar Junction
- Kishanganj
- New Jalpaiguri Junction
- New Cooch Behar
- New Alipurduar
- New Bongaigaon Junction
- Rangiya Junction
- Guwahati
- Chaparmukh Junction
- New Haflong
- Badarpur Junction
- New Karimganj
- Dharmanagar
- Kumarghat
- Ambassa
- Teliamura
- Agartala

== Coach composition ==
The train has 20 coaches are :

1. General Unreserved - 4
2. Sleeper Class - 8
3. AC 3rd Class Economy - 1
4. AC 3rd Class - 5
5. AC 2nd Class - 2

== Traction ==
As the entire route is fully electrified, it is hauled by an Itarsi Loco Shed-based WAP-7 electric locomotive from Rani Kamalapati to Agartala and vice versa.

== Rake reversal or rake share ==
The train will reverse 1 time:

1. Itarsi Junction

== See also ==
Trains from Rani Kamalapati :

1. Shaan-e-Bhopal Express
2. Rani Kamalapati–Hazrat Nizamuddin Vande Bharat Express
3. Rani Kamalapati–Jabalpur Jan Shatabdi Express
4. Rani Kamalapati–New Delhi Shatabdi Express
5. Pune–Rani Kamalapati Humsafar Express

Trains from Agartala :

1. Agartala–Anand Vihar Terminal Rajdhani Express
2. Agartala–Narangi Express
3. Agartala–SMVT Bengaluru Humsafar Express
4. Agartala Tejas Rajdhani Express
5. Deoghar–Agartala Weekly Express

== Notes ==
a. Runs a day in a week with both directions.
