= Agartala–Narangi Express =

Train in India

Agartala – Narangi Express

Overview
- Service type: Express
- Status: Active
- Locale: Tripura and Assam
- First service: 24 March 2026; 5 months ago
- Current operator: Northeast Frontier Railway

Route
- Termini: Agartala (AGTL); Narangi (NNGE)
- Stops: 9
- Distance travelled: 562 km (349 mi)
- Average journey time: 15h 15m (UP); 16h 30m (DN)
- Service frequency: Daily
- Train number: 15649 / 15650

On-board services
- Classes: AC 2-tier AC 3-tier Sleeper class (Non-AC); General Unreserved
- Seating arrangements: Yes
- Sleeping arrangements: Yes
- Auto-rack arrangements: Not available
- Catering facilities: Not available
- Observation facilities: Windows
- Entertainment facilities: Not available
- Baggage facilities: Below the seats

Technical
- Rolling stock: LHB
- Track gauge: 1,676 mm (5 ft 6 in) Broad gauge
- Electrification: No
- Operating speed: Avg. speed 37 km/h (23 mph) (UP) 34 km/h (21 mph) (DN); Max. speed 110 km/h (68 mph)
- Track owner: Indian Railways

The 15649 / 15650 Agartala–Narangi Express is an express train belonging to the Northeast Frontier Railway zone that runs between the city Agartala of Tripura and Narangi of Assam in India.

It operates as train number 15649 from Agartala to Narangi and as train number 15650 in the reverse direction, serving the state of Tripura and Assam.

== Service ==
The 15649 UP/Agartala–Narangi Express has an average speed of 37 km/h and covers a distance of 562 km in 15h 15m. The 15650 DN/Narangi–Agartala Express has an average speed of 34 km/h and covers a distance of 562 km in 16h 30m.

== Schedule ==
Train number	Departure station	Departure time	Departure day	Arrival station	Arrival time	Arrival day
15649	Agartala	09:30 PM	Daily	Narangi	12:45 PM	Next day
15650	Narangi	05:00 PM	Daily	Agartala	09:30 AM	Next day

AGTL - NNGE - AGTL Express
15649		Stations	15650	
Arrival	Departure	Stations	Arrival	Departure
Tripura
----	21:30	Agartala	09:30	----
22:43	22:45	Ambassa	05:22	05:24
23:40	23:42	Kumarghat	04:25	04:27
00:18	00:20	Dharmanagar	03:45	03:47
Assam
01:30	01:32	New Karimganj	02:25	02:27
02:00	02:10	Badarpur Junction	01:50	02:00
04:35	04:37	New Haflong	23:10	23:12
09:10	09:20	Lumding Junction	19:55	20:05
09:55	09:57	Hojai	18:50	18:52
11:00	11:02	Jagiroad	17:45	17:47
12:45	----	Narangi	----	17:00

== Route and halts ==
The important halts of the train are :

- Agartala
- Ambassa
- Kumarghat
- Dharmanagar
- New Karimganj
- Badarpur Junction
- New Haflong
- Lumding Junction
- Hojai
- Jagiroad
- Narangi

== Coach composition ==
The train is equipped with LHB rakes having a maximum speed of 110 km/h. The train consists of 13 coaches:

- 1 AC II Tier Sleeper (A1)
- 3 AC III Tier Sleeper (B1 to B3)
- 3 Non-AC Sleeper coaches (S1 to S3)
- 4 General Unreserved
- 1 Seating cum Luggage Rake (Divyangjan)
- 1 EOG (End-On Generation) coach

=== Coach position ===
Loco	1	2	3	4	5	6	7	8	9	10	11	12	13
	EOG	GN	GN	B1	B2	A1	B3	S1	S2	S3	GN	GN	SLRD

== Traction ==
As the entire route is fully not electrified, it is hauled by a Siliguri Loco Shed and Guwahati Loco Shed-based WDP-4, WDP-4D and WDG-4D diesel locomotive from Agartala to Narangi and vice versa.

== Rake reversal or rake share ==
The train has 1 rake reversal :

1. Lumding Junction

== See also ==
- Guwahati–Dullabcherra Express
- Rangiya–Silchar Express
- Guwahati–Sairang Express
- Barak Brahmaputra Express
- Nagaland Express
- Guwahati–Ledo Intercity Express

== Notes ==
a. Runs daily in a week with both directions.
