= Agartala–Lumding Express =

MG Express train in India

Agartala – Lumding Express
Overview
- Service type: Mail/Express
- Status: Cancelled
- Locale: Tripura & Assam
- First service: October 2008
- Last service: September 2014
- Current operator: Northeast Frontier Railways

Route
- Termini: Agartala; Lumding Junction
- Stops: 17 (3 abandoned)
- Distance travelled: 406 km (252 mi)
- Average journey time: 19 hours
- Service frequency: Daily
- Train number: 15695/15696

On-board services
- Classes: AC 2 tier (1); Sleeper (7); General (2); SLR (2)
- Seating arrangements: Available
- Sleeping arrangements: Available
- Auto-rack arrangements: Not Available
- Catering facilities: Not Available
- Observation facilities: Windows
- Baggage facilities: Under Seat

Technical
- Rolling stock: ICF rakes
- Track gauge: Metre gauge
- Electrification: Not Available
- Operating speed: Avg Speed: 21 km/h (13 mph)

Agartala – Lumding Express was a daily overnight train of Indian Railways. It was the only overnight MG express train from Tripura to Assam, connecting Tripura's capital city Agartala and Lumding. It was the longest overnight MG train journey in this section. The train service is suspended now as the route in which it used to run is now converted to BG from MG. This train was the only option for the passengers of Tripura and Karimganj, who were willing to travel by train to Lumding. It used to depart from Agartala as 15696 at 16:15 and from Lumding Junction as 15695 at 21:30. The train makes its main halt at Karimganj Junction for 25 mins on both sides & loco/rake reversals also takes place here. The train was hauled by the YDM-4 class of Lumding MG diesel loco shed locomotive. 15696 used to be connected with two locos, one in front and another in the rear for pulling and pushing its way to the height of Barail Range, from Harangajao to Jatinga. It had a length of 12 coaches with both AC & non - AC. The train used to pass through 36 tunnels in Barail Range made during British Era. Now this entire route is converted to Broad Gauge and the route from Ditokcherra to Mahur is totally diverted to another hill.

== Major Halts ==
- Agartala; start
- Teliamura
- Ambassa
- Kumarghat
- Dharmanagar
- Patharkandi
- Karimganj Junction
- Badarpur Junction
- Harangajao (abandoned) new station New Harangajao is used now
- Jatinga (abandoned) new station Jatinga lumpur is used now
- Lower Haflong (abandoned) new station New Haflong railway station is used now
- Maibang
- Lumding Junction; end

== Gallery ==
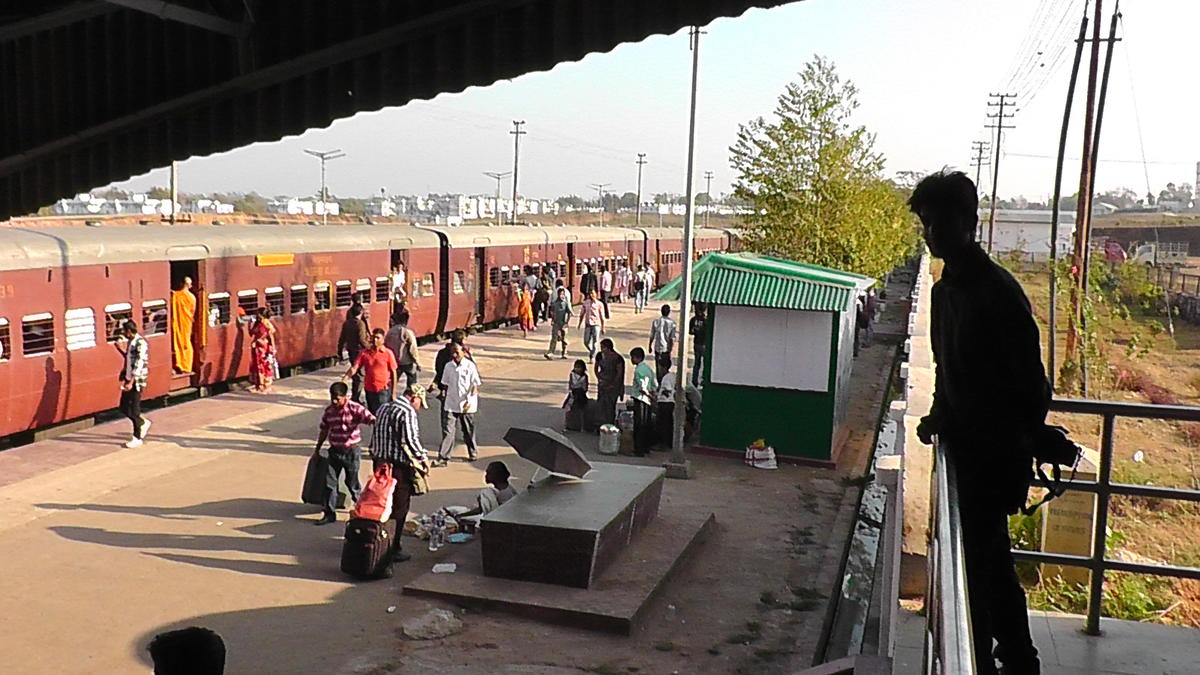
People boarding Agartala Lumding Express at Agartala
