= Ambassa railway station =

Railway station in Tripura, India

Ambassa
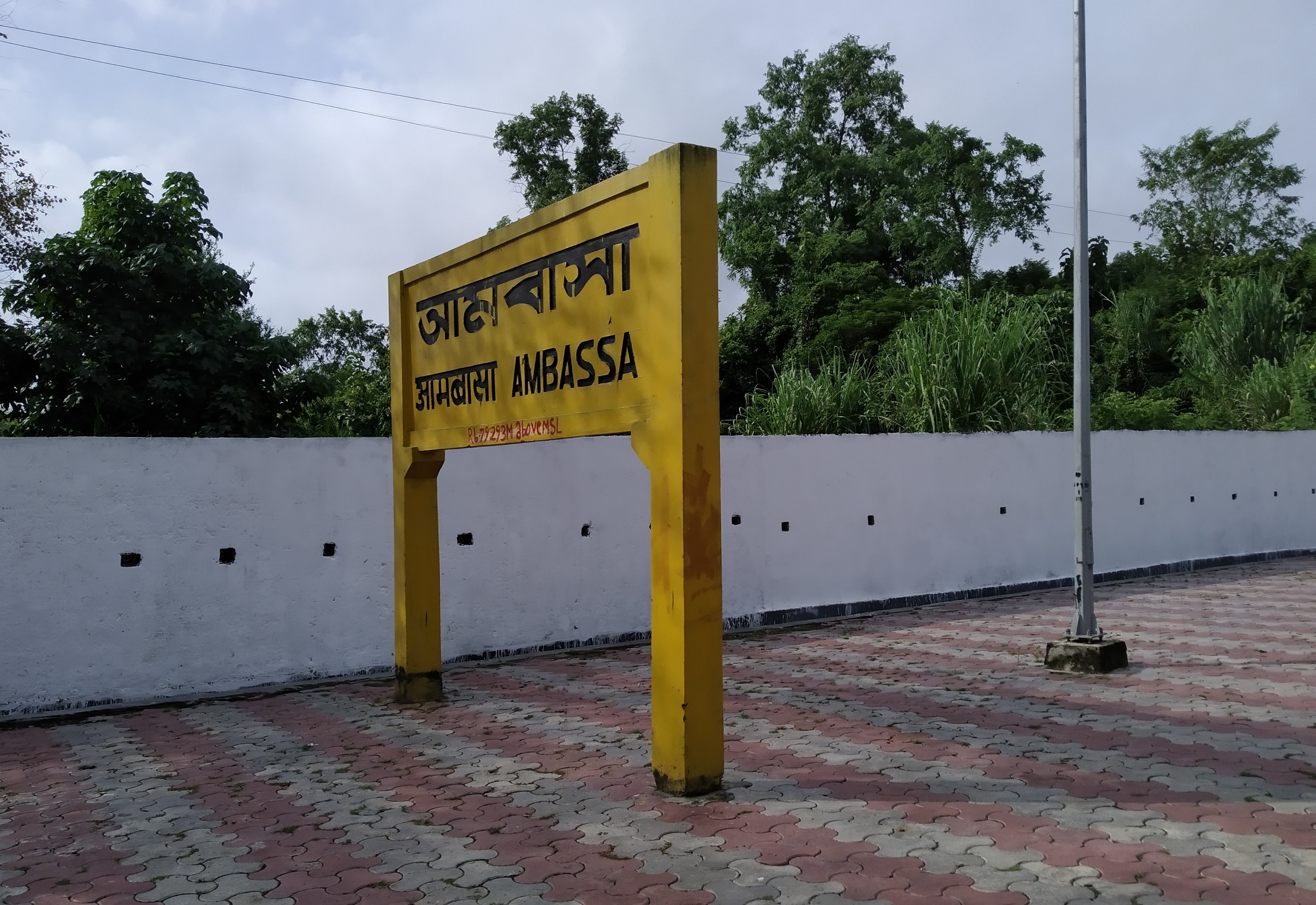
- Ambassa, railway station in Tripura

General information
- Location: National Highway 8, Ambassa, Dhalai district, Tripura; India
- Coordinates: 23°55′50″N 91°51′39″E
- Elevation: 90 metres (300 ft)
- System: Indian Railways station
- Owner: Indian Railways
- Platforms: 3
- Tracks: 4
- Connections: Auto stand

Construction
- Structure type: Standard (on-ground station)
- Parking: No
- Cycle facilities: No
- Accessible: Disabled access

Other information
- Status: Functioning
- Station code: ABSA
- Fare zone: Northeast Frontier Railway zone

History
- Electrified: Ongoing
Location
- Location within Tripura Location within India

Ambassa Railway Station is a small railway station in Dhalai district, Tripura. Its code is ABSA. It serves Ambassa city. The station consists of 3 platforms. One express train till 30 September 2014 used to run between Lumding and Agartala daily. The meter gauge track is converted to broad gauge.

== Platforms ==
There are a total of 3 platforms and 4 tracks. The platforms are connected by foot overbridge. These platforms are built to accumulate 22 coaches express train.

== Station layout ==
G	Street level	Exit/Entrance & ticket counter
P1	FOB, Side platform, No-1 doors will open on the left/right
P1	Track 1
P1	Track 2
P1	Track 3
P1	FOB, Island platform, No- 2 doors will open on the left/right
P1	Track 4

== See also ==
- Teliamura railway station
- Lumding–Sabroom section
- Lumding railway division
- Agartala railway station
- List of railway stations in India

== Major Trains ==
- Agartala - Anand Vihar Terminal Tejas Rajdhani Express
- Agartala - Sir M. Visvesvaraya Terminal Humsafar Express
- Lokmanya Tilak Terminus–Agartala AC Express
- Agartala - Firozpur Cantonment Tripura Sundari Express
- Sabroom - Sealdah Kanchanjungha Express
- Agartala - Deoghar Weekly Express
- Agartala - Dharmanagar Passenger
- Silchar - Dharmanagar Passenger
