= Lokmanya Tilak Terminus–Agartala AC Express =

Agartala–Mumbai LTT AC Express

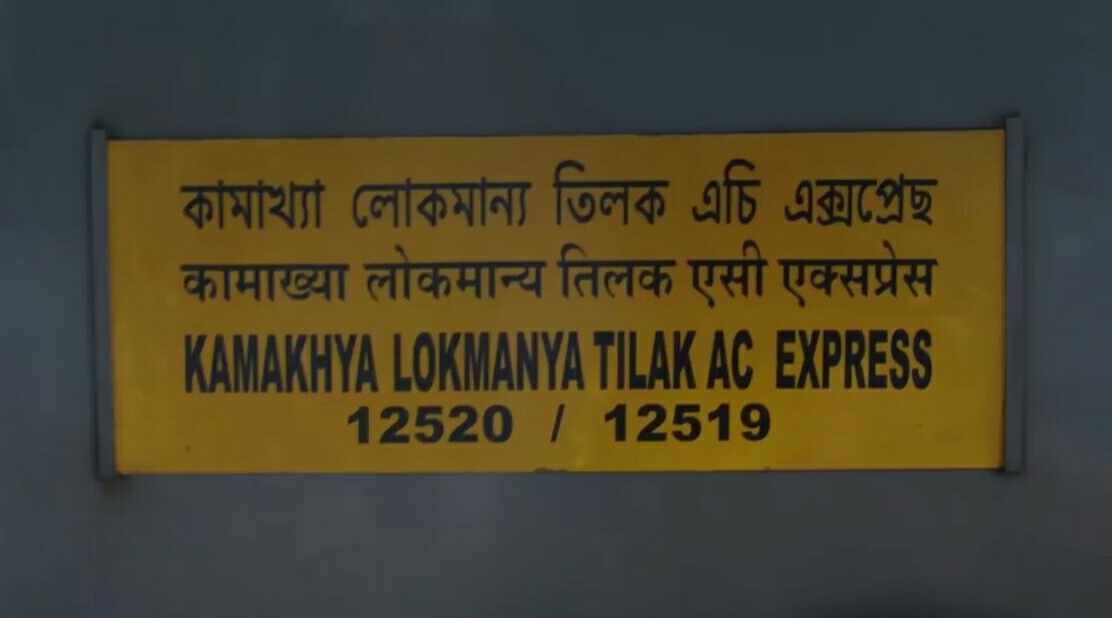
- Trainboard of Mumbai LTT–Agartala AC Express

Overview
- Service type: AC Express
- Status: Operational
- Locale: Tripura, Assam, West Bengal, Bihar, Uttar Pradesh, Madhya Pradesh and Maharashtra
- First service: 21 April 2013
- Current operator: Northeast Frontier Railway

Route
- Termini: Lokmanya Tilak Terminus (LTT); Agartala (AGTL)
- Stops: 24
- Distance travelled: 3,126 km (1,942 mi)
- Average journey time: 44 hours 40 minutes
- Service frequency: Weekly
- Train number: 12519 /12520

On-board services
- Classes: AC 1st Class, AC 2 Tier, AC 3 Tier
- Seating arrangements: No
- Sleeping arrangements: Available
- Auto-rack arrangements: No
- Catering facilities: Pantry car attached
- Observation facilities: LHB coach
- Baggage facilities: Below the seats

Technical
- Track gauge: Broad gauge
- Operating speed: 120 km/h (75 mph) maximum 57 km/h (35 mph) including halts

The Agartala–Mumbai LTT AC Express is a fully air-conditioned Express train connecting Agartala and Mumbai.

This is the first fully air conditioned train connecting the north eastern and western parts of India touching Tripura, Assam, West Bengal, Bihar, Uttar Pradesh, Madhya Pradesh and Maharashtra. It is the fastest train connecting Northeast India and Mumbai

This train was announced in Union Railway Budget 2012 and it made its first inaugural run on 18 April 2013.

Assam Chief Minister Tarun Gogoi flagged off the first fully air-conditioned Agartala–Lokmanya Tilak Terminal Mumbai AC Express, at a function held at Kamakhya railway station.

This train is currently India's longest running AC Express after its extension to Agartala.

== Accommodations ==
This train comprises 1 First AC, 4 AC 2-Tiers, 14 AC 3-Tiers, 1 AC Hot Buffet Car & 2 Luggage/Parcel cum Generator cum Brake van one of which is provided with the Guards' cabin. Total coach composition is 22. This train will be using the latest LHB coach. Rakes are owned and maintained by Northeast Frontier Railway (NFR).

== Major stops ==
State	Station
Tripura	Agartala
Tripura	Ambassa
Tripura	Dharmanagar
Assam	Badarpur
Assam	New Haflong
Assam	Lumding
Assam	Hojai
Assam	Jagiroad
Assam	Chaparmukh
Assam	Guwahati
Assam	Kamakhya Junction
Assam	Rangiya Junction
Assam	New Bongaigaon Junction
West Bengal	New Cooch Behar Junction
West Bengal	New Jalpaiguri Junction (Siliguri)
Bihar	Kishanganj
Bihar	Katihar Junction
Bihar	Naugachia
Bihar	Khagaria Junction
Bihar	Begusarai
Bihar	Barauni
Bihar	Hajipur Junction
Bihar	Patliputra Junction
Bihar	Danapur
Uttar Pradesh	Pandit Deen Dayal Upadhyaya Junction
Uttar Pradesh	Mirzapur
Uttar Pradesh	Prayagraj Chheoki Junction
Madhya Pradesh	Satna Junction
Madhya Pradesh	Jabalpur Junction
Madhya Pradesh	Itarsi Junction
Madhya Pradesh	Khandwa Junction
Maharashtra	Bhusaval Junction
Maharashtra	Jalgaon Junction
Maharashtra	Manmad Junction
Maharashtra	Nasik Road
Maharashtra	Igatpuri
Maharashtra	Kalyan Junction
Maharashtra	Thane
Maharashtra	Lokmanya Tilak Terminus

== Traction ==
A Gomoh-based WAP-7 hauls the train from Lokmanya Tilak Terminus till Guwahati and from Guwahati to Agartala, the train is hauled by Diesel Loco Shed, Siliguri based WDP4/WDP-4D locomotive and vice versa.
