= Guwahati–Dullabcherra Express =

Train in India

Guwahati – Dullabcherra Express

Overview
- Service type: Mail/Express
- Status: Operating
- Locale: Assam
- First service: 21 October 2023; 2 years ago
- Current operator: Northeast Frontier Railway
- Ridership: 900+ one way (per journey)

Route
- Termini: Guwahati (Ghy); Dullabcherra (Dlcr)
- Stops: 10
- Distance travelled: 411 km (255 mi)
- Average journey time: 11h 30m (DN); 11h 50m (UP)
- Service frequency: Tri-weekly
- Train number: 15617/15618
- Lines used: 3; Guwahati-Lumding Line; Lumding-Sabroom Line; Baraigram-Dullabcherra Branch Line

On-board services
- Classes: AC 2-tier AC 3-tier Sleeper class (Non-AC); General Unreserved
- Disabled access: Available (2 coaches only)
- Seating arrangements: Ordinary style (unreserved)
- Sleeping arrangements: Both AC and Non-AC (reserved)
- Auto-rack arrangements: Not available
- Catering facilities: E-Catering
- Observation facilities: Windows
- Entertainment facilities: Not available
- Baggage facilities: Below the seats

Technical
- Rolling stock: ICF (Utkrisht livery)
- Track gauge: 1,676 mm (5 ft 6 in) Broad gauge
- Electrification: No
- Operating speed: Avg. speed 36 km/h (22 mph) (DN) 35 km/h (22 mph) (UP); Max. speed 110 km/h (68 mph)
- Average length: 335 m approx.
- Track owner: Indian Railways
- Rake maintenance: Guwahati
- Rake sharing: 05697/05698

The 15617/15618 Guwahati–Dullabcherra Express is an Express train belonging to Northeast Frontier Railway zone of Indian Railways that runs between Guwahati and Dullabcherra via old Karimganj Junction in the Indian state of Assam. It is currently being operated with 15617 DN / 15618 UP train numbers on a tri-weekly basis. (Note: 15617 - Mondays, Wednesdays and Saturdays | 15618 - Tuesdays, Thursdays and Sundays) It runs as an overnight train from Guwahati and as a Day-Night train from Dullabcherra.

== Background ==
This train was inaugurated and flagged off on 19 October 2023, from Guwahati by Himanta Biswa Sarma, chief minister of Assam. After inauguration, this became the first direct train service between Guwahati and Dullabcherra. This was also the first train to Guwahati via old Karimganj Junction in 5 years, with the last time a train ran via this station to Guwahati was way back in 2018.

== Service ==
The 15617 DN/Guwahati–Dullabcherra Express has an average speed of 36 km/h and covers a distance of 411 km in 11h 30m. The 15618 UP/Dullabcherra–Guwahati Express has an average speed of 35 km/h and covers a distance of 411 km in 11h 50m.

== Schedule ==
Train number	Departure station	Departure time	Departure day	Arrival station	Arrival time	Arrival day
15617	Guwahati	10:15 PM	Mon, Wed, Sat	Dullabcherra	09:45 AM	Next day
15618	Dullabcherra	11:40 AM	Tue, Thu, Sun	Guwahati	11:30 PM	Same day

GHY - DLCR - GHY Express
15617		Stations	15618	
Arrival	Departure	Stations	Arrival	Departure
----	22:15	Guwahati	23:30	----
23:12	23:14	Jagiroad	21:40	21:42
23:41	23:43	Chaparmukh Junction	21:12	21:14
00:19	00:21	Hojai	20:36	20:38
00:35	00:37	Lanka	20:20	20:22
01:18	01:20	Manderdisa Junction	19:15	19:17
02:40	02:42	Maibang	17:25	17:27
04:00	04:05	New Haflong	16:15	16:20
06:20	06:30	Badarpur Junction	14:00	14:10
07:20	07:30	Karimganj Junction	13:00	13:10
08:23	08:25	Baraigram Junction	12:25	12:27
09:45	----	Dullabcherra	----	11:40

== Route and halts ==
The halts of the train are:

Guwahati (Ghy) ⬇️

- Jagiroad (Jid)
- Chaparmukh Junction (Cpk)
- Hojai (Hji)
- Lanka (Lka)
- Manderdisa Junction (Myd)
- Maibang (Mbg)
- New Haflong (Nhlg)
- Badarpur Junction (Bpb)
- Karimganj Junction (Kxj) (reversal)
- Baraigram Junction (Brgm)

Dullabcherra (Dlcr) ⬆️

== Coach composition ==
The train has dedicated Utkrisht livery ICF rakes with a max speed of 100 km/h. The train consists of 14 coaches:

- 1 AC II Tier Sleeper (A1)
- 2 AC III Tier Sleeper (B1, B2)
- 6 Non-AC Sleeper coaches (S1 to S6)
- 3 General Unreserved
- 2 Seating cum Luggage Rake (Divyangjan)

=== Coach position ===
Loco	1	2	3	4	5	6	7	8	9	10	11	12	13	14
	SLRD	GN	S1	S2	S3	S4	S5	S6	A1	B1	B2	GN	GN	SLRD

== Traction ==
The route is not completely electrified, so both way the trains are hauled by diesel locomotive. Both way the trains are hauled by Siliguri loco shed based WDP-4, WDP-4D & New Guwahati loco shed based WDP-4D, WDG-4D.

== See also ==
- Agartala–Narangi Express
- Rangiya–Silchar Express
- Guwahati–Sairang Express
- Barak Brahmaputra Express
- Nagaland Express
- Guwahati–Ledo Intercity Express
