= Jawaharnagar railway station =

Railway station in Tripura, India

Jawaharnagar জহরনগর
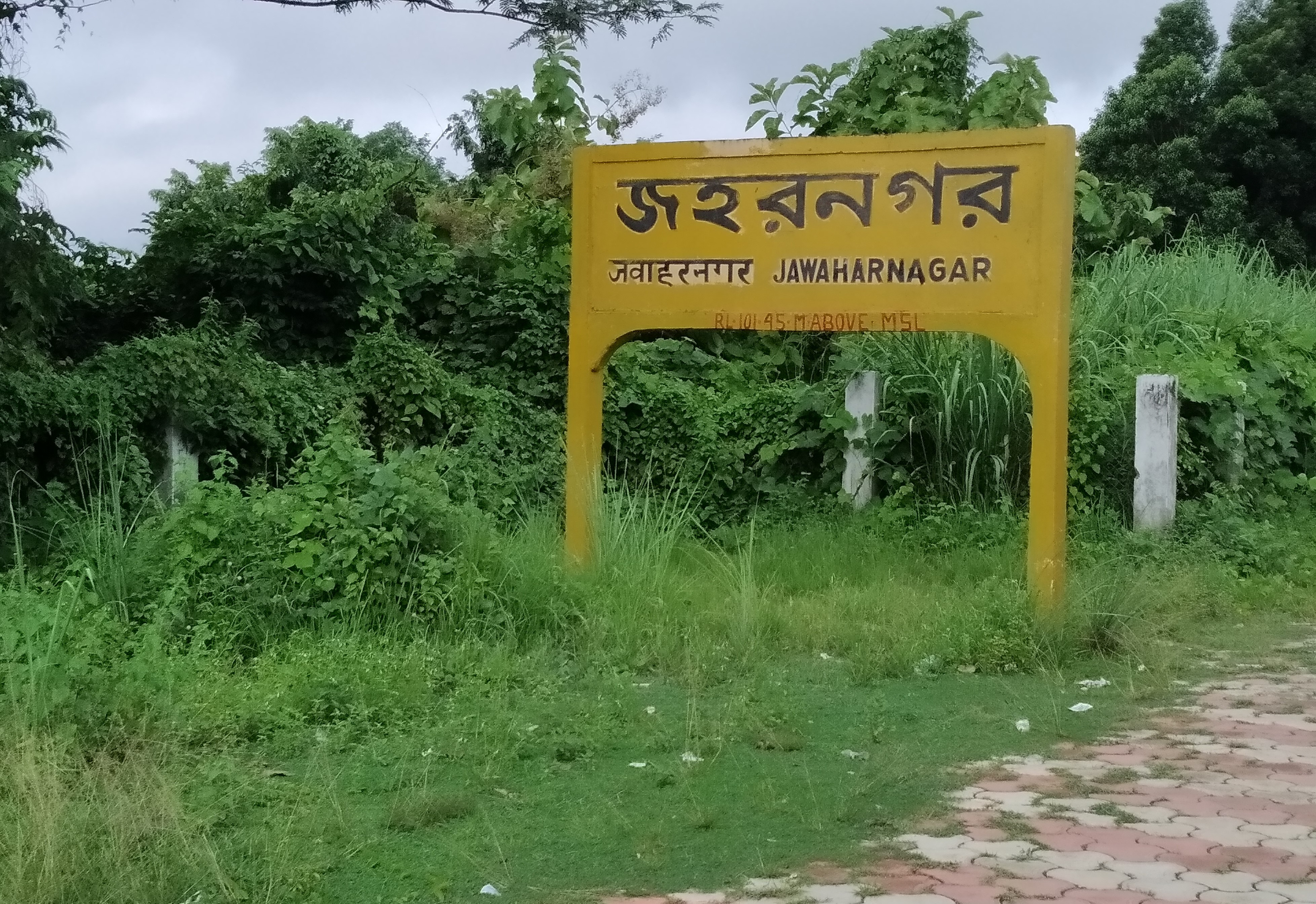
- Jawaharnagar railway station board

General information
- Location: Agartala–Shillong Road, Sikaribari, Dhalai district, Tripura; India
- Coordinates: 23.9195°N 91.9016°E
- Elevation: 102 metres (335 ft)
- System: Light rail station
- Owner: Indian Railways
- Operator: Northeast Frontier Railway zone
- Line: Lumding–Silchar
- Platforms: 1
- Tracks: 1
- Connections: Taxicab stand, Auto rickshaw stand

Construction
- Structure type: Standard (on ground station)
- Parking: Yes
- Accessible: Disabled access

Other information
- Status: Functioning
- Station code: JWNR
- Zone(s): Northeast Frontier Railway Zone
- Division(s): Lumding
Location

Jawaharnagar railway station is a railway station located near Sikaribari of Dhalai district in Tripura.

== Jurisdiction ==
It belongs to the Lumding railway division of the Northeast Frontier Railway Zone of Dhalai district in Tripura. The station code is JWNR.

== Line ==
The station falls on the line between Lumding Junction and Silchar.

== International access ==
A proposal has been mooted to create a 256 kilometres (159 mi) railway line to Myanmar via Mizoram to join the Trans-Asian Railway network in 2013. Also a new proposal of railway line to Dhaka has cropped up in 2015, connecting Myanmar via Sairang in Mizoram. The proposed rail line once established will further connect to Thailand, Singapore and Malaysia.
