= Silchar–Dharmanagar Passenger =

Train in India

Silchar - Dharmanagar Passenger
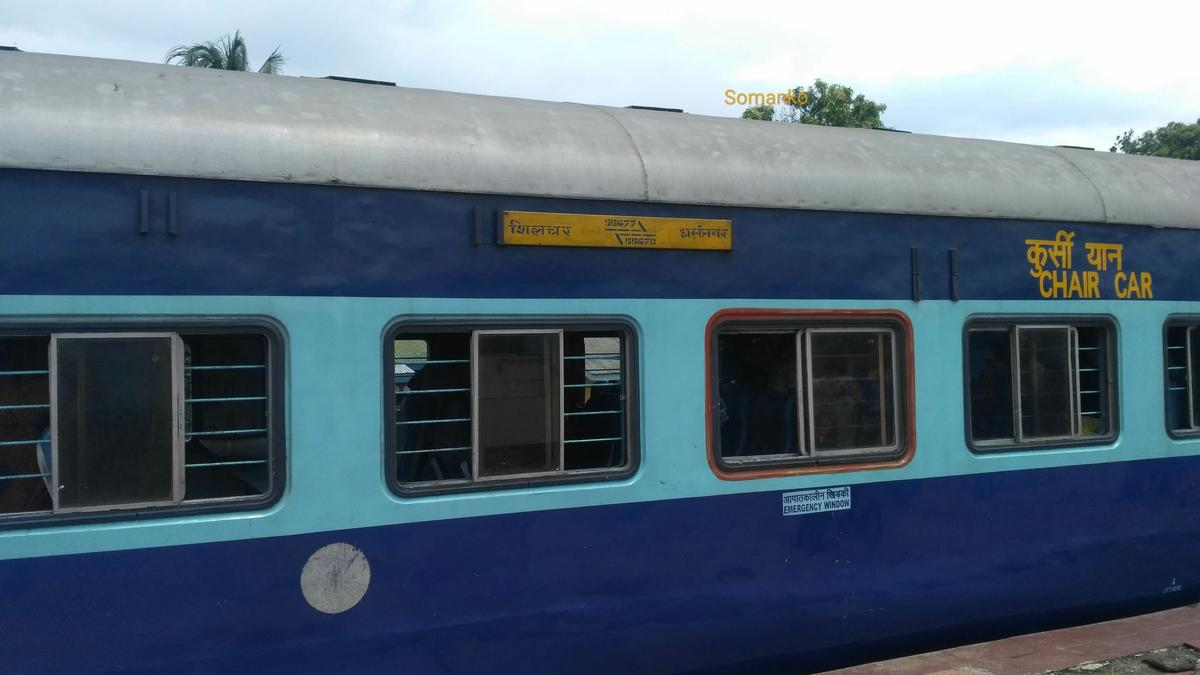
- General Class

Overview
- Service type: Passenger
- Locale: Assam & Tripura
- First service: October 7, 2016
- Current operator(s): Northeast Frontier Railway
- Ridership: 1196 approx.

Route
- Termini: Silchar (SCL); Dharmanagar (DMR)
- Stops: 21
- Distance travelled: 114 km (71 mi)
- Average journey time: 5 hours 15 mins
- Service frequency: Daily (Note: Runs seven days in a week for every direction.)
- Train number(s): 05677 UP/05678 DOWN

On-board services
- Class(es): General (12) SLR (2)
- Seating arrangements: Available
- Sleeping arrangements: Not Available
- Auto-rack arrangements: Not Available
- Catering facilities: ✕ Pantry Car ✕ On-board Catering ✕ E-Catering
- Observation facilities: Windows
- Baggage facilities: Under Seat & Upper racks

Technical
- Rolling stock: ICF rakes
- Track gauge: BG
- Electrification: Not Available
- Operating speed: 22 km/h (14 mph)

The Silchar Dharmanagar Passenger is a passenger train belonging to Northeast Frontier Railway zone of Indian Railways that runs between the largest city in Barak Valley of Assam & second largest city of Tripura, that is, Silchar & Dharmanagar. It is currently being operated with 05677/05678 train numbers on daily basis. The train makes its main halt at Karimganj Junction for 25 minutes & loco/rake reversals also takes place here.

== Average speed and frequency ==
The 05677/UP/Silchar Dharmanagar Passenger runs with an average speed of 22 km/h (14 mph) and completes 114 km (71 mi) in 5 hours 15 mins & 05678/DOWN/ runs with average speed of 23 km/h (14 mph) and completes its journey in 4 hours 55 mins.

== Route and halts ==
The halts of the train are:

- Arunachal Junction
- Salchapra
- Katakhal Junction
- Panchgram
- Badarpur Junction
- Rupasibari
- Bhanga
- Chargola
- New Karimganj
- Karimganj Junction
- Suprakandi
- Nilambazar
- Kayasthagram
- Baraigram Junction
- Kanaibazar
- Patharkandi
- Kalkalighat
- Chandkhira Bagn
- Tilbhum
- Churaibari
- Nadiapur

== Coach composite ==
The train has standard ICF rakes with an average speed of 22 km/h (14 mph). The train consists of 14 coaches:

- 12 General Unreserved
- 2 Seating cum Luggage Rake

== Traction ==
Both trains are hauled by a Siliguri Loco Shed based WDP-4 diesel locomotive from Silchar to Dharmanagar and vice versa.

== Direction reversal ==
Train Reverses its direction 1 time:

- Karimganj Junction

== See also ==
- Silchar railway station
- Dharmanagar railway station
