= Agartala–Dharmanagar Passenger =

Train in India

Overview
- Service type: Passenger
- First service: 7 August 2016; 8 years ago
- Current operator(s): Northeast Frontier Railway

Route
- Termini: Agartala (AGTL); Dharmanagar (DMR)
- Stops: 12
- Distance travelled: 139 km (86 mi)
- Average journey time: 4h 15m
- Service frequency: Daily (Note: Runs seven days in a week for every direction.)
- Train number(s): 05675/05676

On-board services
- Class(es): Unreserved
- Seating arrangements: Yes
- Sleeping arrangements: No
- Catering facilities: No
- Observation facilities: ICF coach
- Entertainment facilities: No
- Baggage facilities: Below the seats

Technical
- Rolling stock: 2
- Track gauge: 5 ft 6 in (1,676 mm)
- Electrification: No
- Operating speed: 33 km/h (21 mph) average with halts

Agartala–Dharmanagar Passenger is a Passenger train belonging to Northeast Frontier Railway zone that runs between Agartala and Dharmanagar, North Tripura district, India. It is currently being operated with 05675/05676 train numbers on a daily basis.

== Average speed and frequency ==
The 05675/Agartala–Dharmanagar Passenger runs with an average speed of 33 km/h and completes 139 km in 4h 15m. The 05676/Dharmanagar–Agartala Passenger runs with an average speed of 35 km/h and completes 139 km in 4h.

== Route and halts ==
The important halts of the train are:

- Agartala
- Dharmanagar

== Coach composite ==
The train has standard ICF rakes with max speed of 110 kmph. The train consists of 21 coaches:

- 1 AC III Tier
- 1 Sleeper class
- 1 Second Sitting
- 6 General Unreserved
- 2 High capacity parcel
- 2 Seating cum Luggage Rake

== Traction ==
Both trains are hauled by a Siliguri Loco Shed-based WDP-4 diesel locomotive from Agartala to Dharmanagar and vice versa.

== See also ==
- Agartala railway station
- Dharmanagar railway station
