= Tripura Sundari Express =

Train in India

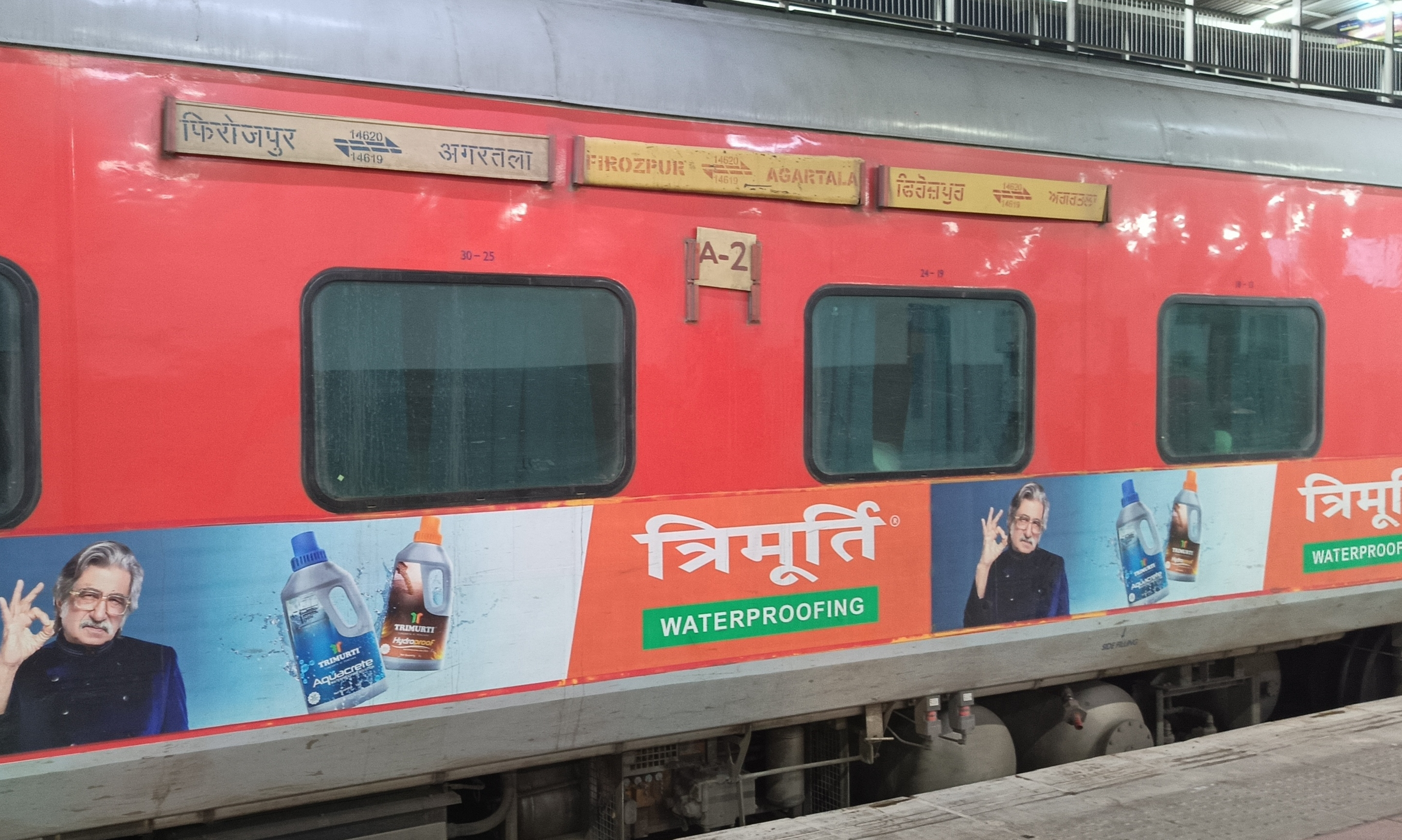
- Tripura Sundari Express at Prayagraj Junction

Overview
- Service type: Express
- Locale: Tripura, Assam, West Bengal, Bihar, Uttar Pradesh, Delhi, Haryana & Punjab
- First service: 31 July 2016; 10 years ago
- Current operator: Northern Railway

Route
- Termini: Agartala (AGTL); Firozpur Cantt. (FZR)
- Stops: 31
- Distance travelled: 2,888 km (1,795 mi)
- Average journey time: 46 hrs 45 mins
- Service frequency: Weekly
- Train number: 14619 / 14620

On-board services
- Classes: AC 2 Tier, AC 3 Tier, Sleeper Class, General Unreserved
- Seating arrangements: Yes
- Sleeping arrangements: Yes
- Catering facilities: Available
- Observation facilities: Large Windows
- Baggage facilities: Available
- Other facilities: Below the seats

Technical
- Rolling stock: LHB coach
- Track gauge: 1,676 mm (5 ft 6 in); Broad Gauge
- Operating speed: 51 km/h (32 mph) average including halts.

The 14619 / 14620 Tripura Sundari Express is a weekly express train belonging to Northern Railway Zone of India, that runs between the cities, Agartala in (Tripura) and Firozpur in (Punjab) state. It is currently being operated with 14619/14620 train numbers on a weekly basis.

== Overview ==
The train is named after the famous Tripura Sundari Temple in Udaipur, Tripura.

== Route & halts ==
TRIPURA

1. Agartala (Starts)
2. Ambassa
3. Dharmanagar

ASSAM

1. Patharkandi
2. New Karimganj
3. Badarpur Junction
4. New Haflong
5. Lumding Junction
6. Hojai
7. Jagiroad
8. Guwahati
9. New Bongaigaon Junction

WEST BENGAL

1. New Jalpaiguri (Siliguri)
2. New Cooch Behar

BIHAR

1. Katihar Junction
2. Barauni Junction
3. Patliputra Junction

UTTAR PRADESH

1. Pt. Deen Dayal Upadhyaya Junction
2. Prayagraj Junction
3. Kanpur Central

DELHI

1. New Delhi
2. Shakurbasti

HARAYANA

1. Rohtak Junction
2. Bhiwani
3. Hisar
4. Mandi Adampur
5. Sirsa
6. Kalanwali

PUNJAB

1. Bathinda Junction
2. Faridkot
3. Firozpur Cantonment (Ends)

== Coach composition ==
Loco	1	2	3	4	5	6	7	8	9	10	11	12	13	14	15	16	17	18	19	20	21	22
	EOG	H1	A1	A2	B1	B2	B3	B4	B5	B6	PC	S1	S2	S3	S4	S5	S6	S7	GN	GN	GN	EOG

== Traction ==
1. From Firozpur Cantonment to New Cooch Behar, the train is hauled by a Ghaziabad Loco Shed / Gomoh Loco Shed based WAP-7 electric locomotive.

2. As the rest of the route is not electrified, so the train is hauled by a Siliguri Loco Shed based WDP-4/WDP-4B/WDP-4D diesel locomotive from New Cooch Behar to Agartala.

== See also ==
- Bangalore Cantonment–Agartala Humsafar Express
- Sealdah–Agartala Kanchenjunga Express
- Agartala–Anand Vihar Terminal Rajdhani Express
- Deoghar–Agartala Weekly Express
- Indian locomotives
