= Narangi railway station =

Railway station in Assam

Narangi
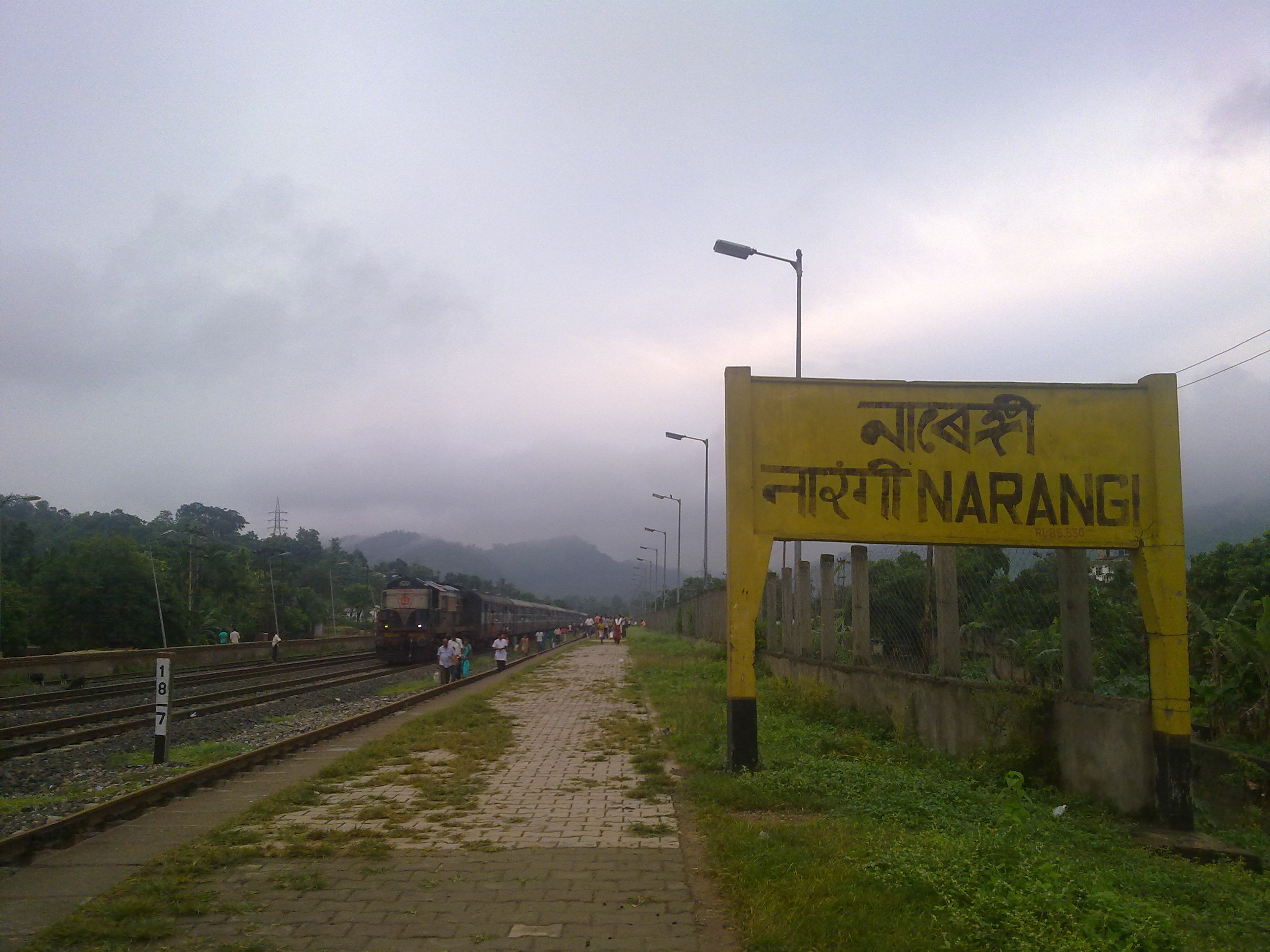
- Narangi railway station

General information
- Location: Chandrapur Road, Birkuchi, Narengi, Guwahati, Assam; India
- Coordinates: 26.1821°N 91.8333°E
- Elevation: 58 metres (190 ft)
- System: Indian Railways station
- Owner: Indian Railways
- Platforms: 2
- Tracks: 4
- Connections: Auto stand

Construction
- Structure type: Standard (on-ground station)
- Parking: No
- Cycle facilities: No

Other information
- Status: Double diesel line
- Station code: NNGE
- Zone(s): Northeast Frontier Railways
- Division(s): Lumding
Location
- Location within Guwahati Location within Assam

Narangi Railway Station is a small railway station in Guwahati, Assam. Its code is NNGE. It serves the Narengi area of Guwahati City. The station consists of 2 platforms. A small local vegetable market called Kolong Par Bazaar lies just beside the exit from the station.

Preceding station	Indian Railways	Following station
Noonmati towards ?	Northeast Frontier Railway zone Guwahati–Lumding section	Panikhaiti towards ?
