= Manderdisa =

- village
- Location in Assam, India Manderdisa (India)
- Coordinates: 25.655°N 93.136°E
- Country: India
- State: Assam
- District: Dima Hasao

Government
  - Body: Gram panchayat

Languages
  - Official: Assamese, Haflong Hindi
- Time zone: UTC+5:30 (IST)

Manderdisa is a village located in Dima Hasao district of Assam state of India. The village is in two parts, and the combined population in the 2011 Census of India was 508 people. Manderdisa railway station of the Indian Railways serves the village and neighboring areas.

== See also ==
- Dima Hasao district
- Manderdisa railway station
