= Jagiroad railway station =

Railway station in the town Jagiroad of Assam, India

Jagiroad

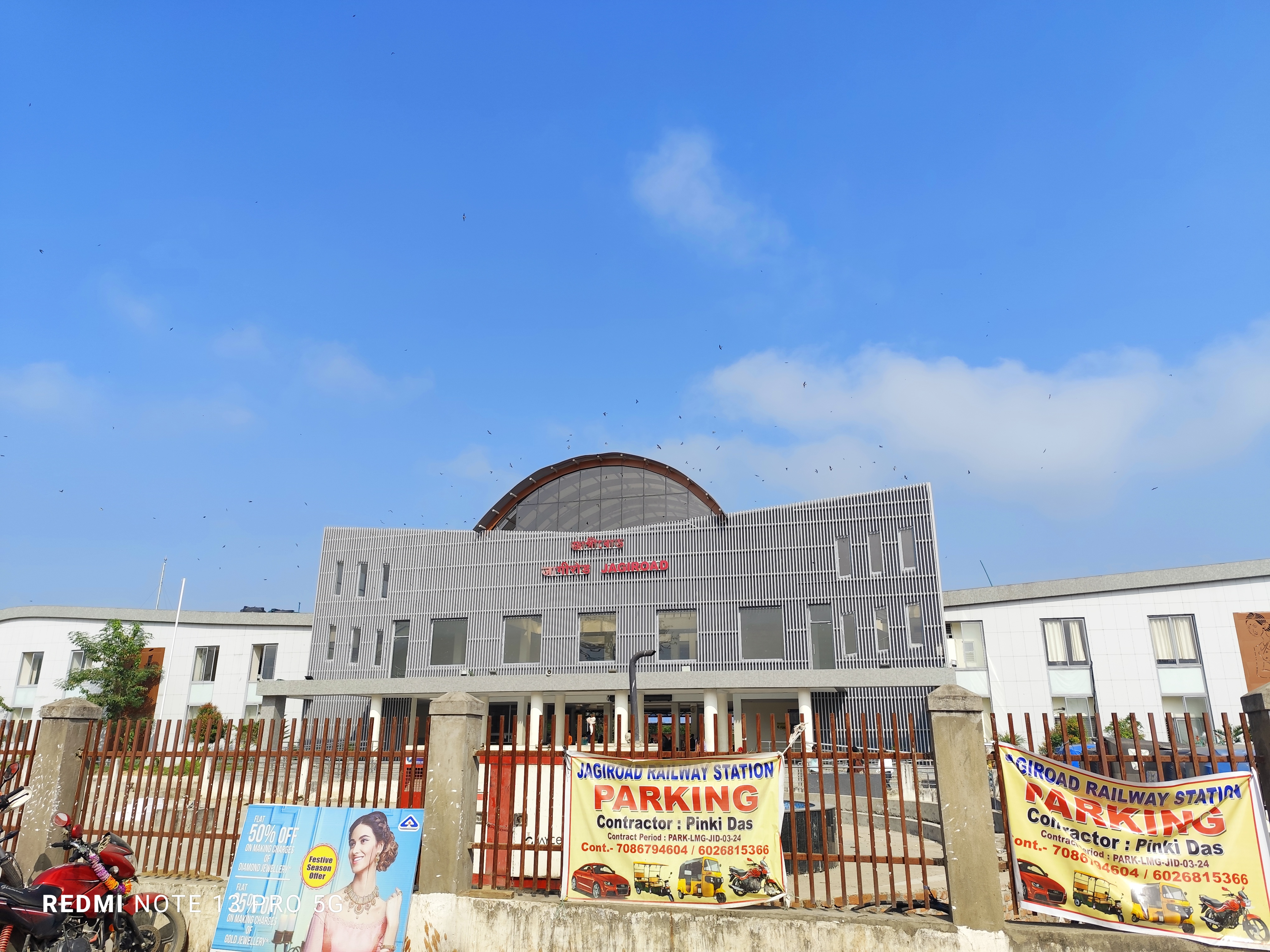
- A picture of jagiroad railway station

General information
- Location: Station Road; Jagiroad, Morigaon 782410, Assam; India
- Coordinates: 26°07′N 92°25′E
- Elevation: 57 m (187 ft)
- System: Indian Railways station
- Owner: Indian Railways
- Operator: Northeast Frontier Railway
- Line: Guwahati–Lumding section
- Platforms: 2
- Tracks: 5
- Connections: Auto rickshaw, E-rickshaw, Bus

Construction
- Structure type: Standard (on-ground station)
- Parking: yes
- Cycle facilities: Available
- Accessible: Yes

Other information
- Status: Operational
- Station code: JID
- Zone(s): Northeast Frontier Railway
- Division(s): Lumding

History
- Opened: 1896; 130 years ago
- Electrified: Yes (December, 2021)
- Former names: Nakhola Railway Station

Passengers
- Over Approx. 700-800 passengers per day

Services
Preceding station	Indian Railways	Following station
Barahu towards Guwahati	Northeast Frontier Railway zone Guwahati–Lumding section	Aujuri towards Lumding
- Waiting Room CCTV Railwire Free Wifi Retiring Rooms Computerized Ticketing Counters Parking Disabled Access
Location
- Location within Assam Location within India

Jagiroad Railway Station coded JID is a railway station in the town Jagiroad of Assam, India. It is an important station on the Guwahati–Lumding section of the Northeast Frontier Railway (NFR).

== History ==
The Jagiroad Railway Station was established in 1896, during the British colonial era. It was originally known as the Nakhola Railway Station. but, later it was renamed to Jagiroad in 1930 to avoid confusion with the Noakhali district in Bangladesh.

The station was built as part of the Assam-Bengal Railway project, which was aimed at connecting the northeastern region of India to the rest of the country. The Jagiroad Railway Station played an important role in the development of the Morigaon district, providing a vital transportation link for the local population.

== Facilities ==
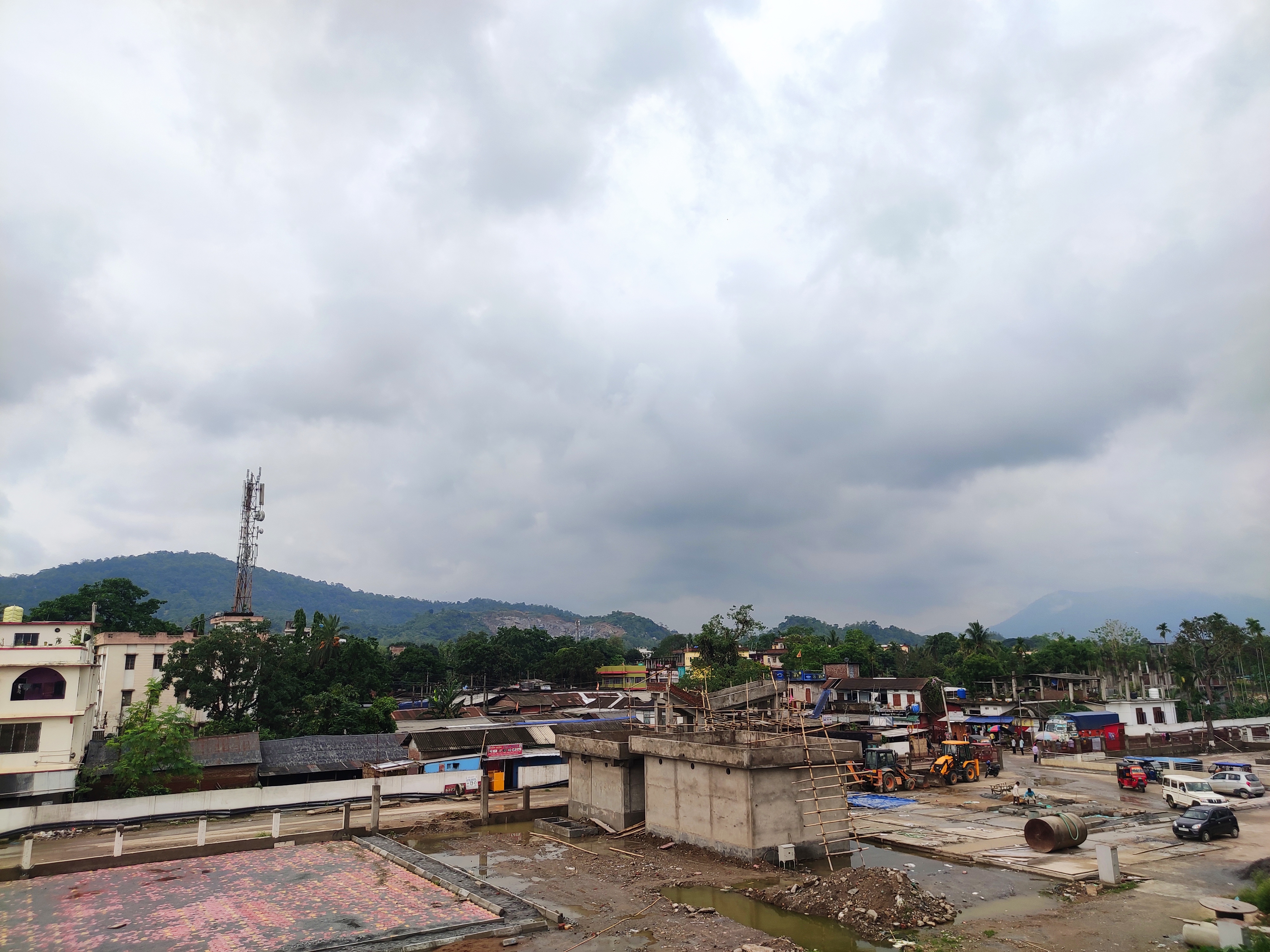
Entry gate and parking area of Jagiroad Station under construction, Amrit Bharat Project.

Jagiroad Railway Station in Assam will get a facelift under the Amrit Bharat Project. (Note: The renovation is part of the Amrit Bharat Project, a government initiative to develop and improve railway infrastructure in India. The project aims to provide passengers with a safe, comfortable, and efficient travel experience.) The station will be given an airport-like look. The upgrade is expected to cater to the needs of railway passengers in the area.

The Northeast Frontier Railway has initiated the construction of a new three-lane Road over Bridge (ROB), measuring 11 meters in width, adjacent to the Jagiroad Railway Station within the Lumding Division. This ROB project spans over 344 meters in total, featuring a central span of 74 meters composed of a Bow String Arch Steel Girder. It is replacing level crossing gate no ST – 27 situated at Jagiroad station yard and NH-715A. The expected completion date for this newly constructed ROB is set for October 2023, with an estimated budget of Rs 70 crore. Notably, the Bow String Girder weighs 730 metric tons and reaches a maximum height of 12.85 meters.

== Major Trains ==
Here is the list of trains that stop in Jagiroad:

- Avadh Assam Express
- Silchar-Secunderabad Express
- Vivek Superfast Express
- Dibrugarh-Rajendra Nagar Express
- Nagaon Express
- Tripura Sundari Express
- Kaziranga Express
- Amrit Bharat Express
- Agartala Deoghar Express
- Jan Shatabdi Express
- Rajya Rani Express
- Sairang Express
- Silchar Rangiya Express
- Narangi Agartala Express
- BG Express
- Ledo & Ntsk Intercity Express
- Mxn Intercity Express
- Dulabcheera Express
- Nagaland Express

== Train derailment ==
On 16 April 2014, around 2:15am Guwahati bound BG Express derailed on the Guwahati-Lumding section near Jagiroad in central Assam's Morigaon district, it's leading to 45 injuries. At the time of the accident, the train was carrying around 700 passengers.

Out of the nine derailed coaches, four fell into a ditch next to the track. About 200 meters of the track were damaged.
