= Manderdisa railway station =

Railway station in Assam, India

General information
- Location: Station road, Manderdisa, Dima Hasao district, Assam; India
- Coordinates: 25.7196611°N 93.1279287°E
- System: Indian Railways station Regional rail
- Owner: Indian Railways
- Operator: Northeast Frontier Railway
- Line: Lumding–Sabroom section
- Platforms: 2
- Tracks: 2
- Connections: Auto rickshaw

Construction
- Structure type: Standard (on-ground station)
- Parking: Available

Other information
- Status: Active
- Station code: MYD
- Zone(s): Northeast Frontier Railway zone
- Division(s): Lumding

Services
Preceding station	Indian Railways	Following station
Hatikhali towards ?	Northeast Frontier Railway zone Lumding–Sabroom section	Lumding Junction towards ?
Location
- Location within Assam

Manderdisa railway station is an Indian railway station of the Lumding–Sabroom section in the Northeast Frontier Railway zone of Indian Railways. The station is situated at Manderdisa in Dima Hasao district in the Indian state of Assam. It serves Manderdisa and surroundings areas. Distance between Lumding Junction and Manderdisa is 10 km (144 mi).

== Details ==
The station lies on the 312 km long 1,676 mm (5 ft 6 in) broad-gauge Lumding–Sabroom railway line which comes under the Lumding railway division of the Northeast Frontier Railway zone of Indian Railways. It is a single line without electrification.

== Station ==
=== Station layout ===
G	Street level	Exit/Entrance & Ticket counter
P1	FOB, Side platform, No-1 doors will open on the left/right
P1	Track 1	toward →
P1	Track 2	toward →
P1	Track 3	toward →
P1	FOB, Island platform, No- 2 doors will open on the left/right

=== Platforms ===
There are a total of 2 platforms and 3 tracks. The platforms are connected by foot overbridge.
