= Agartala Tejas Rajdhani Express =

Rajdhani Express in India

Agartala - Anand Vihar Terminal Tejas Rajdhani Express

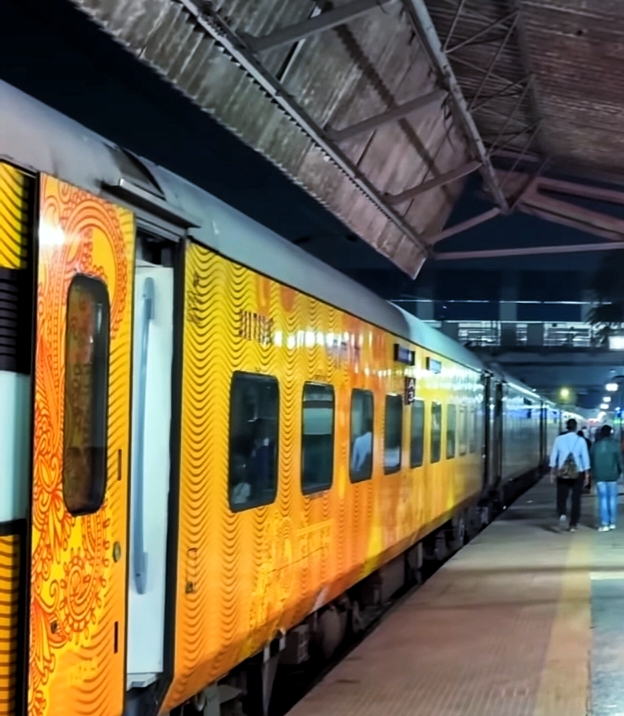
- Agartala Tejas Rajdhani Express Arrived At Prayagraj Junction railway station

Overview
- Service type: Tejas Rajdhani Express
- First service: 28 October 2017; 9 years ago
- Current operator: Northeast Frontier Railway

Route
- Termini: Agartala (AGTL); Anand Vihar Terminal (ANVT)
- Stops: 20
- Distance travelled: 2,423 km (1,506 mi)
- Average journey time: 43hrs 40mins
- Service frequency: Weekly (Note: Runs one day in a week for every direction.)
- Train number: 20501 / 20502

On-board services
- Classes: AC First, AC 2 tier, AC 3 tier.
- Seating arrangements: No
- Sleeping arrangements: Yes
- Catering facilities: Available
- Observation facilities: Large windows
- Baggage facilities: Below the seats

Technical
- Rolling stock: LHB Tejas rakes
- Track gauge: 1,676 mm (5 ft 6 in)
- Operating speed: 130 km/h (81 mph) maximum, 59 km/h (37 mph) average including halts.

The 20501 / 20502 Agartala – Anand Vihar Terminal Tejas Rajdhani Express is a flagship Rajdhani-class train operated by Indian Railways. It connects Agartala, the capital city of state of Tripura in Northeast India, to Anand Vihar Terminal in Delhi, the national capital. Notably, it is the only Rajdhani-class train originating from the eastern part of India that terminates at Anand Vihar Terminal, instead of New Delhi Railway station in Delhi.

It became the first Rajdhani express to be rolled out with Tejas Express Liveried Sleeper LHB Coaches from 15 February 2021.

== Running ==
During the time of its introduction, the Agartala Rajdhani Express use to traverse via Katihar- Barauni – Patliputra route to Delhi. However, on 15 January 2024, due to commercial requirements and passenger demand, the Railway Board approved its re-routing via Malda Town – Bhagalpur – Jamalpur – Patna route, with commercial stoppages at Malda Town, Bhagalpur, Jamalpur and Patna Junction, on 05 March 2026 due to passengers demand railways provide stoppage at Maibang on experimental basis

== Routes and halts ==
• Agartala

• Ambassa

• Dharmanagar

• New Karimganj Junction

• Badarpur Junction

• New Haflong

• Maibang

• Hojai

• Guwahati

• Rangiya Junction

• Barpeta Road

• New Cooch Behar

• New Jalpaiguri

• Kishanganj

• Malda Town

• Sahibganj Junction

• Bhagalpur Junction

• Jamalpur Junction

• Patna Junction

• Pandit Deen Dayal Upadhyay Junction

• Kanpur central

• Anand Vihar Terminal

== Traction ==
This train is hauled by WDP-4, WDP-4B, WDP-4D of Siliguri Loco shed From Agartala to Guwahati.After the Guwahati this train is hauled by the WAP-7 of Ghaziabad shed.

== Coach composition ==
At first this train used ICF Coaches but on 15 February 2021 this train got new LHB Tejas coach.

This train consists of

1 AC first tier coaches

4 AC two tier coaches

12 AC three tier coaches

2 EOG coaches

1 High-capacity parcel van coach

== Coach positioning ==
This coach positioning is for 20501 at Agartala

LOCO-HCP-EOG-A1-A2-A3-A4–H1-PC-B1-B2-B3-B4-B5-B6-B7-B8-B9-B10-B11-B12-EOG

This is vice versa for 20502 at Anand Vihar Terminal.

== See also ==
- Agartala railway station
- Anand Vihar Terminal railway station
- Tripura Sundari Express
- Agartala–SMVT Bengaluru Humsafar Express
- Sealdah–Agartala Kanchenjunga Express
- Deoghar–Agartala Weekly Express
- Howrah Rajdhani Express
- Patna Tejas Rajdhani Express
- Bhubaneshwar Tejas Rajdhani Express
