= Ambassa =

Ambassa Āmbāsā (Bengali)
- Census town
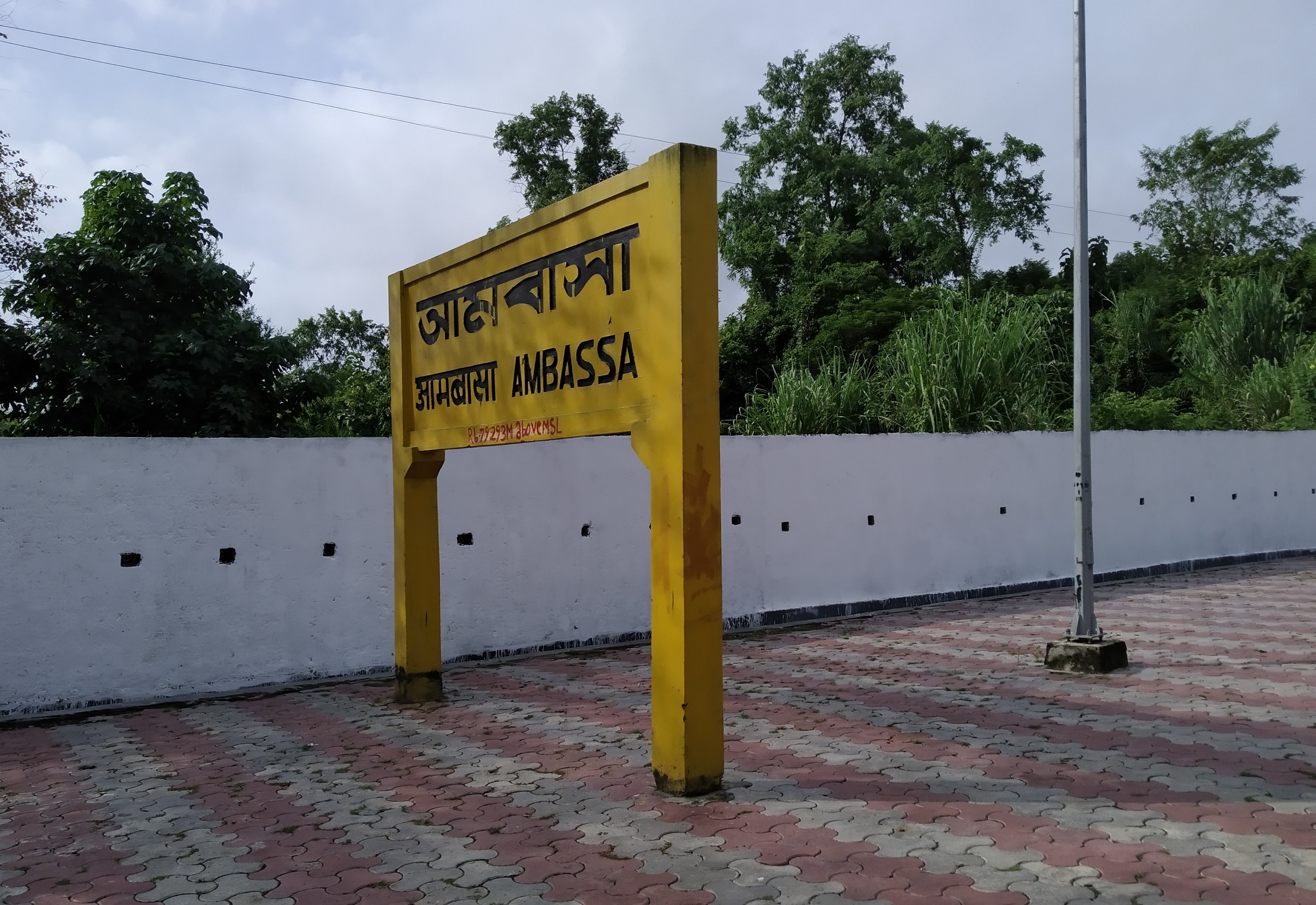
- A picture of Ambassa railway station

- Location in Tripura, India Ambassa (India)
- Coordinates: 23°55′10.8″N 91°50′42″E
- Country: India
- State: Tripura
- District: Dhalai

Government
  - Type: Municipal Council
  - Body: Ambassa Municipal Council
  - Chairman: Smt. Mamata Das (BJP)

Languages
  - Official: Bengali, Kokborok, English
- Time zone: UTC+5:30 (IST)
- Postal code: 799289
- Vehicle registration: TR-04
- Website: tripura.gov.in

Ambassa is a census town located in the Indian state of Tripura a Municipal Council in Dhalai district. Ambassa is also the headquarters of the Dhalai district.

== Demographics ==
As of 2001 India census, Ambassa had a population of 6,052. Males constituted 54% of the population and females 46%. Ambassa had an average literacy rate of 70%, higher than the national average of 59.5%; 60% of males and 40% of females were literate. 13% of the population were under 6 years of age.

== See also ==
- List of cities and towns in Tripura
