= Dharmanagar railway station =

Railway station in Tripura, India

Dharmanagar ধর্মনগর
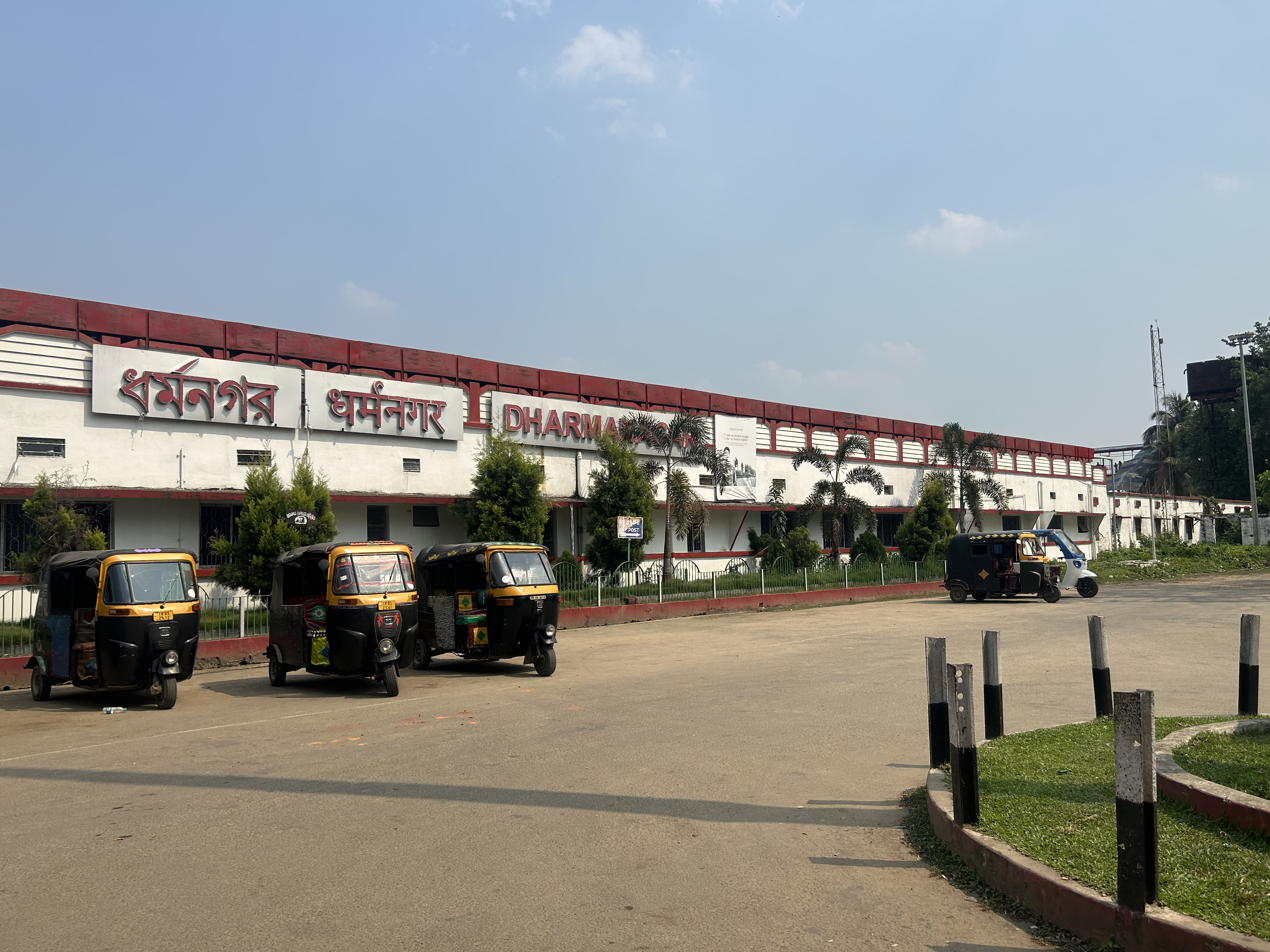

General information
- Location: Dharmanagar, North Tripura district, Tripura; India
- Coordinates: 24.3702°N 92.1699°E
- Elevation: 21 metres (69 ft)
- System: Indian Railways station
- Owner: Indian Railways
- Operator: Northeast Frontier Railway
- Line: Lumding–Sabroom section
- Platforms: 2
- Tracks: 4
- Connections: Auto stand

Construction
- Structure type: Standard (on ground station)
- Parking: Yes
- Cycle facilities: No

Other information
- Status: Active
- Station code: DMR
- Zone(s): Northeast Frontier Railway
- Division(s): Lumding

History
- Electrified: Ongoing
Location
- Location within Tripura Location within India

Dharmanagar Railway Station is the main railway station in North Tripura district. It is the oldest railway station in the state. It serves Dharmanagar and nearby cities of the district. The station consists of 2 platforms. The platform is not well sheltered. It lacks many facilities including water and sanitation.

== Major trains ==
- Agartala - Anand Vihar Terminal Tejas Rajdhani Express
- Agartala - Sir M. Visvesvaraya Terminal Humsafar Express
- Lokmanya Tilak Terminus–Agartala AC Express
- Agartala - Firozpur Cantonment Tripura Sundari Express
- Sealdah–Sabroom Kanchanjunga Express
- Agartala - Deoghar Weekly Express
- Agartala - Dharmanagar Passenger
- Silchar - Dharmanagar Passenger
- Agartala - Kolkata Special Fare Express
- Agartala - Rani Kamlapati (Bhopal) Weekly Express
- Agartala - Secunderabad Superfast Special
- Agartala - Khongsang Janshatabdi Express
- Agartala - Dharmanagar DEMU Special
