= Deoghar–Agartala Weekly Express =

Express train in India

Deoghar Junction–Agartala Weekly Express
Overview
- Service type: Express
- First service: 6 July 2018; 7 years ago
- Current operator: Northeast Frontier Railway zone

Route
- Termini: Deoghar Junction (DGHR); Agartala (AGTL)
- Stops: 19
- Distance travelled: 1,472 km (915 mi)
- Average journey time: 34h 15min
- Service frequency: Weekly (Note: Runs one days in a week for every direction.)
- Train number: 15625/15626

On-board services
- Classes: AC 3 tier, Sleeper class, General Unreserved
- Seating arrangements: No
- Sleeping arrangements: Yes
- Catering facilities: On-board catering E-catering
- Observation facilities: LHB coach
- Entertainment facilities: No
- Baggage facilities: No
- Other facilities: Below the seats

Technical
- Rolling stock: 1
- Track gauge: 1,676 mm (5 ft 6 in)
- Operating speed: 43 km/h (27 mph), including halts

The Deoghar–Agartala Weekly Express is an Express train belonging to Northeast Frontier Railway zone that runs between Deoghar Junction in Jharkhand, India and Agartala in Tripura, India. It is currently being operated with 15625/15626 train numbers on a weekly basis.

== Service ==
The 15625/Deoghar–Agartala Weekly Express has an average speed of 40 km/h and covers 1474 km in 34hrs 15min. The 15626/Agartala–Deoghar Weekly Express has an average speed of 39 km/h and covers 1474 km in 36h 00min.

== Route and halts ==
The important halts of the train are:

JHARKHAND (Starts)

- Deoghar Junction

BIHAR

- Banka Junction
- Bhagalpur Junction
- Munger
- Khagaria Junction
- Naugachia
- Katihar Junction

WEST BENGAL

- New Jalpaiguri (Siliguri)
- New Cooch Behar

ASSAM

- New Bongaigaon Junction
- Rangiya Junction
- Kamakhya Junction
- Guwahati
- Chaparmukh Junction
- Lumding Junction
- New Haflong
- Badarpur Junction

TRIPURA

- Dharmanagar
- Ambassa
- Agartala (Ends)

== Coach composition ==
The train has standard ICF rakes with a max speed of 110 kmph. The train consists of 14 coaches:

- 2 AC III Tier
- 7 Sleeper coaches
- 3 General Unreserved
- 2 Seating cum Luggage Rake

== Traction ==
Both trains are hauled by a Siliguri Loco Shed-based WDP-4 or WDG-4 diesel locomotive from Agartala to New Cooch Behar and WAP-7 Locomotive of Electric Loco Shed, Howrah from New Cooch Behar to Deoghar Junction and vice versa.

== Direction reversal ==
The train reverses its direction one times:

- Lumding Junction

== See also ==
- Deoghar Junction railway station
- Sealdah railway station
- Sealdah–Silchar Kanchenjunga Express
- Kanchenjunga Express
