= Dhalai district =

- District of Tripura
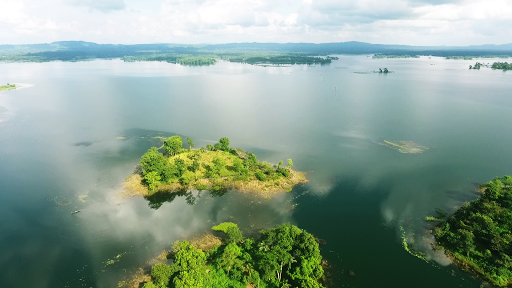
- Dumboor Lake
- Interactive map of Dhalai district
- Coordinates: 23.91634°N 91.88782°E
- Country: India
- State: Tripura
- Established: 1995
- Headquarter: Ambassa

Government
  - Lok Sabha constituencies: Tripura East
  - Vidhan Sabha constituencies: Ambassa, Chawamanu, Kamalpur, Karamcherra, Raima Valley, Surma

Area
  - Total: 2,312.29 km^{2} (892.78 sq mi)

Population (2011)
  - Total: 378,000
  - Density: 163/km^{2} (423/sq mi)

Demographics
  - Literacy: 96.79 %
  - Sex ratio: --
- Time zone: UTC+05:30 (IST)
- Postal codes: 799289 ; 799273 ; 799285 ; 799204 ; 799287 ; 799275 ; 799284
- Telephone code: +03826 ; +03824
- Vehicle registration: TR 04
- Major highways: NH 8
- Average annual precipitation: 1922 mm - 2855 mm
- Website: dhalai.nic.in

Dhalai district (pron: /ˈdʰɔlai/) is an administrative district in the state of Tripura in India. The district headquarter is in Ambassa. As of 2011, it was the least populous district of Tripura (out of 8 districts), despite being the largest.

== History ==
Dhalai District was created in 1995 by bifurcating North Tripura District and including part of Amarpur Sub-Division of the South Tripura District. It was created keeping in view the administrative exigency of providing development and good governance to the largely Tribal and inaccessible areas. The district is named after Dhalai River which originates in the district.

== Geography ==
In the North-eastern part of Tripura, the district covers an area of about 2426 km^{2}. It is mainly between two hills: Atharamura Range and Sakhan Range. More than 70% area is hilly and forest covered. The terrain is mostly undulating and hilly with small water streams (chharas), rivers and fertile valleys intervening. Major rivers originating from Dhalai are Dhalai, Khowai, Gomati and Manu. Major hills are Atharamura, Longtharai, Kalajhari and part of Sakhan.

The district headquarters at Ambassa is about 85 km from the state capital Agartala. The district is bordered by Bangladesh on the northern and southern sides.

Oil and Natural Gas Corporation is exploring for natural gas reserves in the district in Salema block. The district falls in Seismic Zone 5 of India and is prone to landslides, thunderstorms and lightning strikes in summer and rainy seasons.

- Dhalai district on Google maps

== Climate ==
The district has a tropical climate with hot and humid summers, a prolonged rainy season and warm winters. Rains are frequent in March and April. Maximum temperatures in summers and winters are 36 °C and 28 °C, respectively. The minimum temperatures in summers and winters are 17 degree and 5.3 degree Celsius respectively.

== Demographics ==
Religions in Dhalai district (2011)
Religion	Percent
Hindus	81.20%
Buddhists	10.34%
Christians	6.07%
Muslims	2.18%
Other or not stated	0.21%
Distribution of religions

According to the 2011 census Dhalai district has a population of 378,230, roughly equal to the nation of Maldives. This gives it a ranking of 564th in India (out of a total of 640). The district has a population density of 157 inhabitants per square kilometre (410/sq mi). Its population growth rate over the decade 2001-2011 was 22.78%. Dhalai has a sex ratio of 945 females for every 1000 males and a literacy rate of 86.82%. Scheduled Castes and Scheduled Tribes make up 16.31% and 55.68% of the population respectively.

Languages of Dhalai district (2011)
1. Kokborok (41.6%)
2. Bengali (35.1%)
3. Chakma (9.07%)
4. Hindi (2.06%)
5. Garo (1.07%)
6. Halam (1.60%)
7. Manipuri (1.47%)
8. Odia (1.43%)
9. Bishnupuriya (1.20%)
10. Mog (1.07%)
11. Others (4.38%)

At the time of the 2011 census, 41.57% of the population spoke Kokborok, 35.08% Bengali, 9.07% Chakma, 2.06% Hindi, 1.87% Garo, 1.60% Halam, 1.47% Manipuri, 1.43% Odia, 1.20% Bishnupuriya and 1.07% Mog as their first language.

== Parliamentary constituency ==
Dhalai shares the Lok Sabha constituency of Tripura East (shared with North Tripura and South Tripura districts). The Member of Parliament of 18th Lok Sabha for this constituency is Kriti Devi Debbarman. The state of Tripura sends a single member for Rajya Sabha, currently Rajib Bhattacharjee.

== Administrative divisions ==
Sl. No	Subdivision	Headquarters	Blocks	Tehsils
1	Ambassa	Ambassa	Ambassa, Ganganagar	Ambassa, Dalubari, Nalichara, Shikaribari, Ganganagar
2	Kamalpur	Kamalpur	Salema, Durgachowmuhani	Kamalpur, Barasurma, Mahabir, Manikbhander, Mayachari, Baralutma, Halhali, Salema, Kachuchara
3	Gondatwisa	Gondatwisa	Dumburnagar, Raishyabari	Gondatwisa, Jagbandhupara, Raishyabari, Hathimatha
4	Longtharai Valley	Chailengta	Manu, Chawmanu	Manu, Chailengta, Karamchara, Chawmanu, Manikpur, Gobindbari
	Dhalai District	4 Sub-divisions	8 R.D. Blocks	24 Tehsils

== Governance ==
=== Administration ===
The district has a Zone of Tripura Tribal Areas Autonomous District Council, headed by a Zonal Development Officer. The police department is headed by a Superintendent of Police. Sub-jails are in Kamalpur and Gondatwisa. The Sub-divisions are headed by a Sub-Divisional Magistrate and Collector, who is in charge of revenue, elections, land records, birth and death registration, tribal welfare and law and order. At the R.D. Block, a Block Development Officer is administrative head who implements all the government development schemes in the villages like MGNREGS, Indira Awaas Yojana, Swachh Bharat Abhiyan etc. At the village level, the Rural Panchayat Secretary assists Gram Sabha and Gram Panchayat in administration.

=== Publicly elected representatives under Panchayati Raj Institution ===
There are two Municipal Councils at Ambassa and Kamalpur and 137 Gram Panchayats (under Government of Tripura) or Village Committees (under TTAADC) headed by a chairperson. At the Rural Development (RD) Block level Block Advisory Committee and Panchayat Samiti headed by a chairperson. Zilla Parishad is the apex institution at the district level headed by a Sabhadhipati.

=== Development initiatives ===
There are development schemes and programmes implemented in the district. The notable among these are Indo-German Development Cooperation Project (IGDC), Integrated Watershed Management Project (IWMP), National Rural Livelihood Mission (state unit Tripura rural livelihood mission), Mahatma Gandhi National Rural Employment Guarantee Scheme, Border Area Development Programme (BADP), Backward Regions Grant Fund (BRGF), Special Central Assistance to Tribal Sub Plan (SCA to TSP), Swachh Bharat Abhiyan Swachh Bharat Mission - Gramin - SBM(G) (erstwhile Nirmal Bharat Abhiyan, NBA).

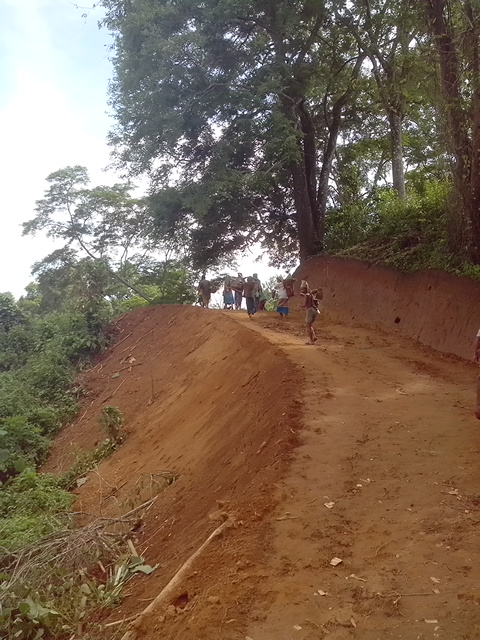
MGNREGA Road formation work at Ghantacherra, Ambassa block in 2014

== Educational institutions ==
The district administration claims 96.79% literacy, largely attributed to the primary schools built and running in almost every habitation. However, according to Census 2011, the literacy rate was 86.82%: 92.45% for males and 80.83% for females creating gender gap of 11.62%.

The primary school system, up to class 8 is mainly supported by the Sarva Shiksha Abhiyan programme of the Government of India. It is managed by the State Government (Junior Basic schools in non-ADC areas and most of the Senior Basic and Higher Secondary schools in ADC and non-ADC areas) and TTAADC (mainly the Junior Basic schools in ADC areas).

There are 24 English medium schools in Dhalai. There are four special schools — Jawahar Navodaya Vidyalaya, at 82 miles in Manu Block, and Kasturba Gandhi Balika Vidyalaya at Gondatwisa, Ganganagar and Hezacharra along with Kendriya Vidyalaya at Jawaharnagar, Ambassa. There are residential schools set up by government and missionary organisations. Tripura Tribal Welfare Residential Educational Institutions Society (TTWREIS) runs the Radhamohan Memorial Ashram School at Sadhu tilla, Ambassa. St. Arnold's Schools are at Dalapatipara, Gandatwisa and Lalchari, Ambassa. Holy Cross High School is at Kathalcherra, Manu block.

There is one Dhalai District Polytechnic, at Kamalacherra, Ambassa, Industrial Training Institute at Lalchari, Ambassa, and Government Degree Colleges at Ambassa, Gonda Twisa, Kamalpur and Chailengta.

== Healthcare ==
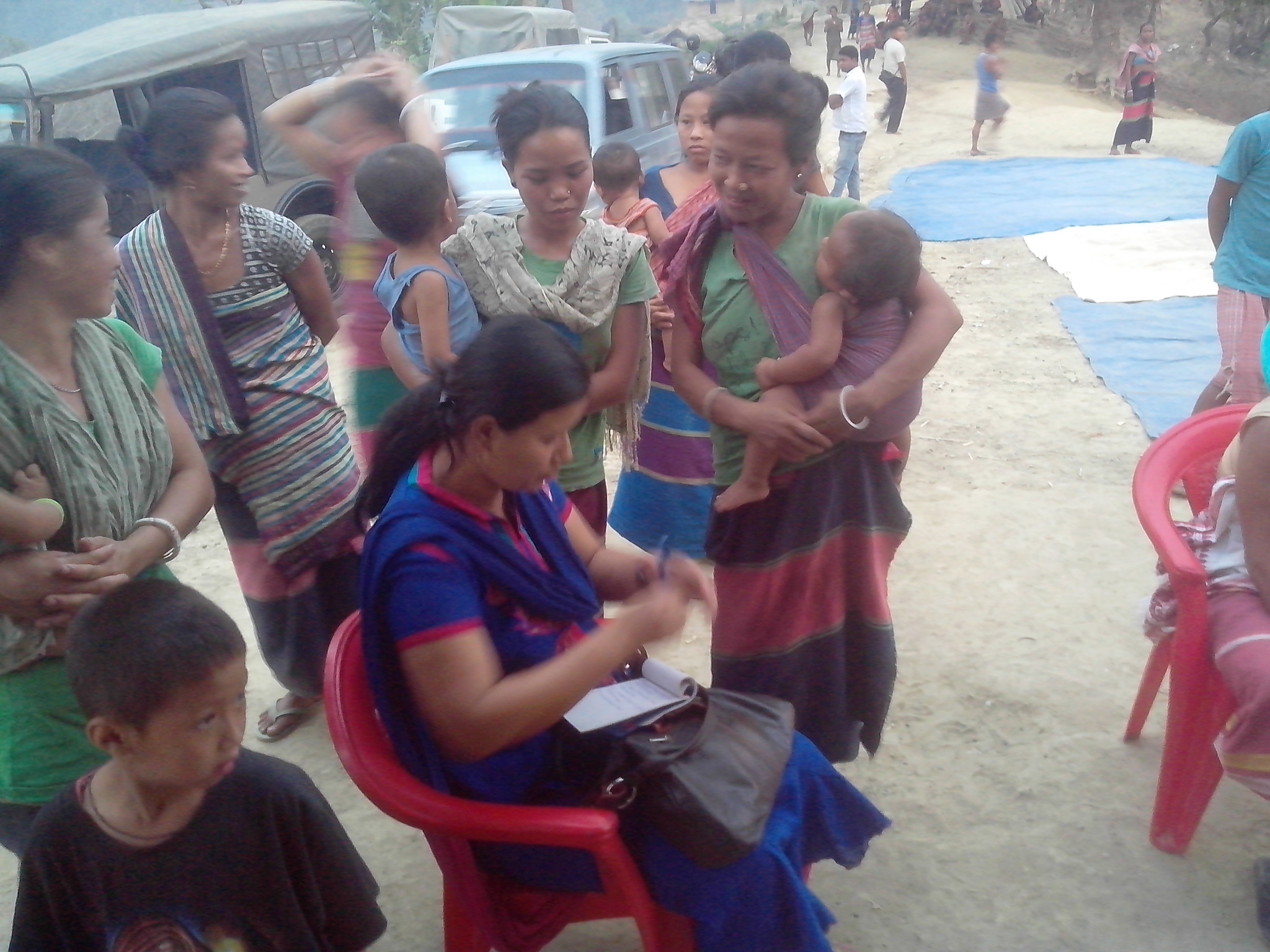
Health check-up camp at Srinibash para, Dhalai, Tripura

National Rural Health Mission (NRHM, now National Health Mission, NHM)is being implemented in the district.

Dhalai has a District Hospital at Kulai in Ambassa block, sub-divisional hospitals at Kamalpur, Gandacherra and Manu. In addition to them, Primary Health Centers, Community Health Center and Health Sub-centers are in the villages. Multi Purpose health Worker (MPW), Auxiliary Nurse and Midwives (ANM) and Accredited Social Health Activist (ASHA) deliver healthcare services at village level.

Private practitioners of allopathy and homoeopathy are present in the district. Traditional health practitioners called "Uja/Uza" work with locally available medicinal plants and some rituals, but the practise has declined greatly due to availability of modern healthcare.

The district is in humid and forested region and is highly prone to diseases like malaria, diarrhoea and Japanese encephalitis. In summer 2014, there was a large outbreak of malaria across the district.

== Security and border management ==
Having an international boundary with Bangladesh has led to deployment of Border Security Force battalions. The district also has other paramilitary units of Central Reserve Police Force, Assam Rifles and state government's Tripura State Rifles. Armed Forces (Special Powers) Act (AFSPA), was operational in the district when insurgency was rampant in the state. However, security units have successfully managed to reduce the insurgency in the region leading to step-by-step reduction in the area under operation of AFSPA, finally being lifted from entire state in May 2015.

The 3rd Battalion of Tripura State Rifles (TSR) is at Kachucherra in Ambassa block. Units of this battalion are given the responsibility of security of railway track, security in Kathalbari-Sikaribari region among other. (Outposts/camps of security forces are often in forest areas which makes them vulnerable to malaria due to high infestation of mosquitoes in the region.)

== Infrastructure ==
=== Transport ===
National Highway 44 runs from Guwahati-Shillong in the northeast to center and then to west towards Agartala. Work had begun but currently stopped for National Highway 44-A connecting Manu to Aizawl, Mizoram.

The district has meter gauge rail connectivity on the Lumding-Agartala line with stations at Manu, Jawaharnagar and Ambassa. There is a non-functional airstrip at Kamalpur. Tripura Road Transport Commission runs bus service from Ambassa to Agartala, Kamalpur, Gandacherra. Nearly 330 habitations, out of a total of 1037, are not connected by any motorable road, about 95 of them being in the Gandacherra region. There are many individual private operators who run local transport services to block headquarters, villages and to Agartala. Private transport companies also run bus service from Ambassa to Shillong and Guwahati.

Transport in the urban regions of Ambassa and Kamalpur are run by auto-rickshaws and cycle-rickshaws. All the transport services are regulated by transport unions of drivers and owners.

When militancy was rampant in the district and AFSPA was in force, travelling on the highway happened in batches with patrol squad of paramilitary forces on the ends of the motorcade. Although such procedures are stopped now, paramilitary forces exercise foot patrol of important roads.

=== Electricity ===
Tripura State Electricity Corporation Limited is the provider of grid-connected electricity to the district. Unconnected habitations and border outposts are serviced by Tripura Renewable Energy Development Agency by solar photovoltaic systems. There is less load-shedding in towns but long hours of load shedding is done for rural areas. The distribution network often gets disturbed due to storms and trees falling on distribution lines.

=== Drinking water ===
Drinking Water and Sanitation wing of the Public Works Department manages the drinking water supply in the district. Schools and Anganwadi Centers have been specifically targeted to improve drinking water supply as well as attendance to these institutions. Most of region suffers from excessive iron content in the groundwater which necessitates installation of iron removal plants (IRPs). 579 habitations have partial coverage of drinking water supply and 16 habitations have reported drinking water quality problem. A water treatment plant is set up in Kulai near Ambassa.

Most of the rural areas get drinking water from deep tube wells, handpumps, ring wells with a few having overhead water tanks. Many villages need drinking water supplied by tanker in the dry season and 59 such distressed pockets have been identified. Private contractors and government run tanker supply services. Many tribal inhabitations use water from open streams and ponds for drinking, cooking, washing utensils and clothes, and bathing. Water-borne disease diarrhoea is common due to mixing of human excreta into drinking water source in many villages.

Packaged drinking water of brands "Twimuk", "Tribeni", "Eco Freshh", "Blue Fina", "Life Drop" and "Aqua Zoom" among others is consumed in government offices, restaurants etc. Filters of many types and brands, in addition to locally manufactured ceramic filters, are sold although their acceptance in rural areas is less. Halogen tablets are distributed by the administration to reduce microbial content in water, which is sometimes consumed as a medicine directly in some areas or its use discontinued due to the smell it imparts to drinking water.

=== Sanitation ===
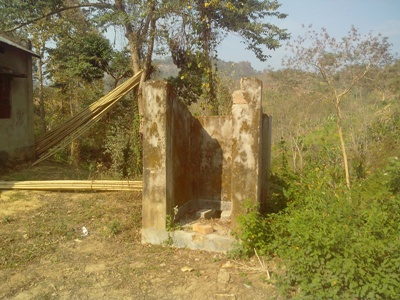
Situation of toilet built for Anganwadi in Chand Kumar para of Kathalbari in Ambassa block, Dhalai district, Tripura

Dhalai district has high incidence of open defecation, especially in the interior hilly and forest areas. The district has implemented Nirmal Bharat Abhiyan, the Swachh Bharat Abhiyan and convergence with MGNREGS to address this problem, with commendable success in difficult areas like Kalyansing village in Gondatwisa.

Schools and Anganwadi Center are focused on providing urinals and latrines, separate for boys and girls along with baby-friendly toilets in Anganwadi Centers to inculcate the habit of using sanitary latrines at a young age. However, many toilets lie dysfunctional due to lack of maintenance and damage. Earlier schemes of providing free plastic squatting plates has not produced results as most of them lie unused as many people cannot afford to construct a toilet. Open defecation has created problems of diarrhoea and vulnerability to malaria.

=== Irrigation ===
Except for the areas near streams and rivers, most of the agriculture is rain-fed. Perennial irrigation is minimal with only barrages, large structures for storing water, being used. Small check dams and ponds built by the local residents and by the government under many programmes and schemes are the source of water for irrigation and other purposes. Efforts are ongoing by the district administration to identify fallow land that can be brought under perennial irrigation with small dams or borewells.

=== Telecommunication ===
The district has landline telephone services of BSNL, although not in all the block. Cellular network service providers along with 2G services for the most part and 3G in Ambassa and Kamalpur are BSNL, Airtel, Aircel and Reliance, with some interior areas not covered. The district is part of the Tripura State Wide Area Network which is an OFC-supported system up to Block Development Officer and other important institutions. BSNL provides Wi-Max and WLL services to some areas.

The police department has its own wireless communication system. All India Radio has transmission tower at Sikaribari of meter wave range and partial coverage of FM range.

== Economy ==
In 2006 the Ministry of Panchayati Raj named Dhalai one of the country's 250 most backward districts (out of a total of 640). It is the only district in Tripura receiving funds from the Backward Regions Grant Fund Programme (BRGF). The district has predominantly agrarian economy with several micro- and small-scale industrial units.

=== Agriculture ===
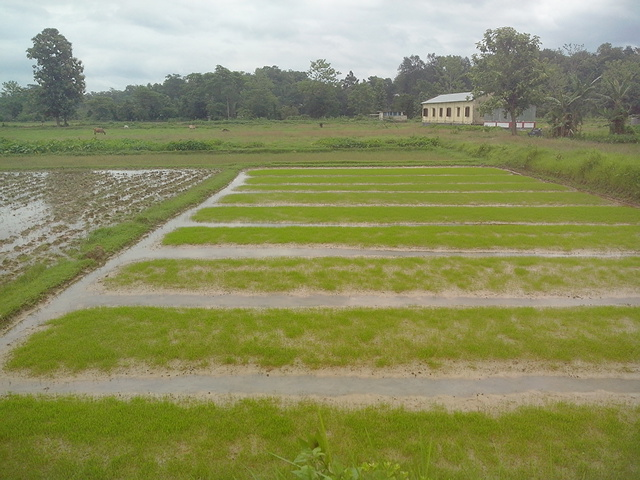
Fodder cultivation in the kharif season

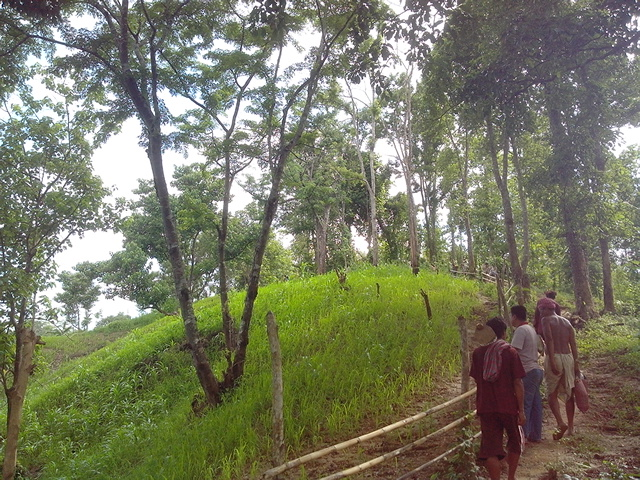
Villagers returning from MGNREGA work along a "Jhum" field in the hills near Ghantacherra, Ambassa block

Most of the district is dependent on rain-fed farming although due to heavy rains in the monsoon and rain in winter and summer makes sufficient supply of water. Irrigation ponds form another water supply for agriculture.

Horticultural plantations include banana, pineapple, mango, litchi, jackfruit, papaya, betel nut, orange, lemon, and other fruit trees. North Eastern Regional Agricultural Marketing Corporation Limited (NERAMAC) had Fruit Juice Concentration Plant (FJCP) at Nalkata since 1988, but it has been non-operational since 2010. Several tea estates are in Manu, Chawmanu, Salema and Durgachowmuhani blocks, with a tea processing unit at Salema.

Vegetables like tomato, cabbage, cauliflower, snake gourd, pumpkin, okra, corn, cucumber, beans, potato, carrot, radish, bamboo shoot are grown in parts of the district. Spice cultivation includes chili pepper, coriander, ginger, turmeric, tamarind, garlic, onion etc.

Animal husbandry includes cow, pig, goat, duck and poultry rearing. The Animal Resource Department has set up Pig Breeding Farm at Nalichera and Regional Exotic Pig Breeding Farm and Composite Livestock Farm for Goats at Nalkata. Fisheries form a prominent income activity with local production as well as fish imported from Andhra Pradesh sold in huge quantities, with the Fisheries Department setting up hatcheries at Gondatwisa and Karamcherra. Center for Microfinance and Livelihood Northeast, an organisation supported by Tata Trusts, has planned for fisheries and dairy development in the district.

=== Industry ===
Micro- and small-scale industrial units of latex processing, metal article fabrication, bakery, saw mill etc. exist in the district. There are brick kilns operating across the district, including Ambassa, Gondatwisa, Kulai, Salema, Chailengta. Tripura Industrial Development Corporation Limited has planned an "Integrated Infrastructure Development Centre" in Dhalai, but a site for it is yet to be selected. MSME Development Institute, Agartala has created areas of industrial development, and steps to set up a new industrial unit in Dhalai. Tripura Bamboo Mission has set up bamboo clusters for incense sticks, basketry and bamboo cultivation at Manu, Kamalpur, Ambassa, Salema and Ganganagar.

=== Services ===
Service sector units consist largely of small shops of grocery, vegetables, fish, meat, electrical and consumer appliances, mobile phones sale and talktime recharging, photocopying, internet cafés, photography, tailoring, salons, jewellery, vehicle repairing, books and stationary, garments etc. Coaching of computer operating, school subjects of Science, Mathematics and English, Odia including private home tutoring form another small part. In the banking sector, State Bank of India, Tripura Gramin Bank, Tripura State Cooperative Bank, United Bank of India, Bank of India, Central Bank of India, Uco Bank, Canara Bank and ICICI Bank have their branches across in the district.

== Religion ==
Hindus form a majority of the community, although there are Buddhists (mostly Chakma and Mog communities), Christians and Muslims. Religious organisations in district are Ramakrishna Sevasadan, Baptist Church, St. Arnold's Mission etc.

== Media, Society and Culture ==
One of the biggest media at Dhalai is "Amar Tripura Media Network" . This Media network has been made with Amar Tripura TV Channel (Bengali), Imangni Tripura TV Channel (Kokborok), Film, Serial and Telefilm Making Production Dreams Picture and online News Publisher on www.amartripura.com

The major tribes inhabiting the region are Tripuri, Reang, Kuki (Halam/Darlong/Hrangkhawl), Koloi and Chakma. Reangs are one of the Primitive Tribal Groups (PTG) or Particularly Vulnerable Tribal Group (PVTG) as classified by the Government of India.

Jhum festival after harvesting season, Hojagiri of the Bru-Reangs, Bihu/Bizu of the Chakmas, Garia Puja are prominent festivals celebrated. Bengali communities mostly reside in the plain region in the west and northwestern regions. Durga Puja, Ker Puja, Biswakarma Puja are their prominent festivals.

There are NGOs operating in the district: Prabaha Dhalai (working in the sector of goat rearing and HIV/AIDS), Project Bharosa (working with schools and SHGs), National Foundation for Communal Harmony (assisting destitute children), "Prayaas" Relief Committee for Disabled Persons, Action Research and Training Organisation at Manu. Tata Trusts-funded Center for Microfinance and Livelihood has started Tripura State Initiative in Dhalai district in Fishery (Manu block) and Dairy (Salema block) sectors.

The District Sports Complex in Ambassa has two badminton courts, table tennis and carrom board, gymnastics equipment and regular judo training is ongoing. Currently there is no trained physical instructor appointed in the complex. A swimming pool is available at Kulai school. There are many playgrounds and stadia including those at Gondatwisa, Ambassa, East Kathalcherra and Kamalpur. A new sports complex is being constructed in Kekmacherra in Ambassa block. Yearly sports events are organised by the State Sports Authority.

== Achievements and special mentions ==
Dhalai was one of the first districts to implement MGNREGS and Aadhaar enrolment. For the financial year 2014–15, the district was the highest in the country in generating average person-days, at 99, of wage labour generated under the Mahatma Gandhi National Rural Employment Guarantee Scheme under the National Rural Employment Guarantee Act 2005.

The 35th Shodh Yatra was organised at Gondatwisa in the district from 13 to 18 May 2015.
