= Badarpur Junction railway station =

Railway station serving the city of Badarpur in Assam, India

Badarpur Junction
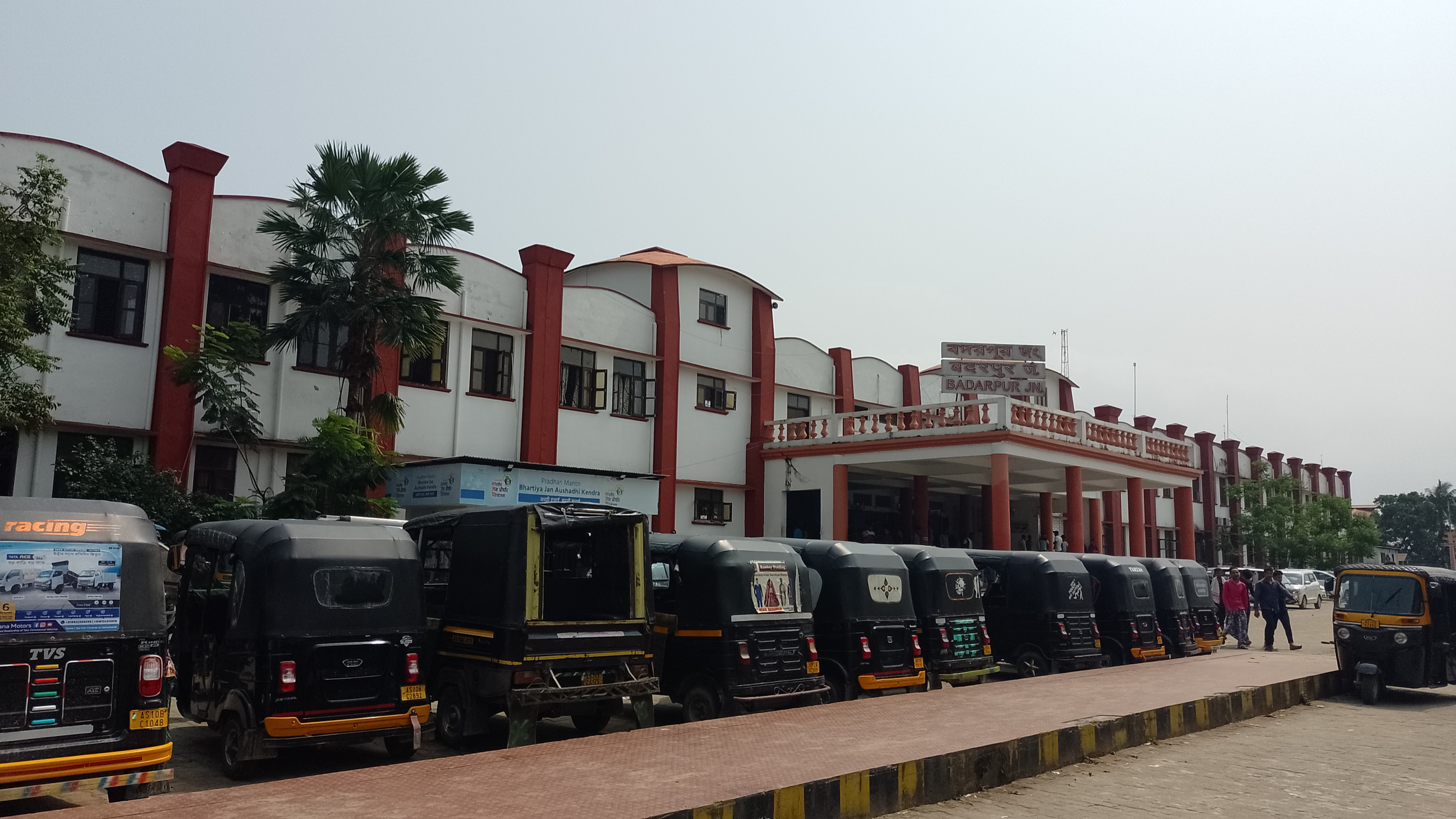
- Front view of Badarpur Junction

General information
- Location: Badarpur, Assam; India
- Coordinates: 24°51′56″N 92°33′24″E
- System: Train station
- Owner: Indian Railways
- Operator: Northeast Frontier Railway
- Line: Lumding–Sabroom section
- Tracks: 9 (3 for passenger train)
- Connections: Cabs,ASTCbus, Autorickshaw & E-Rikshaw

Construction
- Structure type: At grade
- Parking: Available
- Cycle facilities: Available

Other information
- Status: Functioning
- Station code: BPB
- Zone(s): Northeast Frontier
- Division(s): Lumding

History
- Opened: 1898; 128 years ago
- Closed: 2014
- Rebuilt: 2015
- Electrified: Yes

Services
Location
- Location within Assam Location within India

Badarpur Railway Station serves the Indian city of Badarpur in Assam. It belongs to Lumding railway division of Northeast Frontier Railway of India. It is located at Cachar district in the state of Assam. It is one of the oldest station of India built in 1898. The Station connects Badarpur to other regions of Barak Valley as well as many parts of India. Badarpur railway station is also the largest and most important railway station in Barak valley and south Assam region.

== History ==
Assam Bengal Railway was incorporated in 1892 to serve British-owned tea plantations in Assam. The railway line from Chittagong to Badarpur was opened to traffic in 1898. In 1942 the management of Assam Bengal Railway was transferred to the Govt of India. It was amalgamated with the state managed Eastern Bengal Railway and designated as Assam Bengal Railway.

On 1 January 1942 the Assam Bengal Railway combined with the Eastern Bengal Railway to form the Bengal and Assam Railway. At time of the independence of India in 1947, Bengal–Assam Railway was split up and the portion of the system, about 2,603.92 km long which fell within the boundary of erstwhile East Pakistan was named as Eastern Bengal Railway, the control remaining with the central Government of Pakistan. Later, with the effect from 1 February 1961, Eastern Bengal Railway was renamed as Pakistan Railway. In 1958 the Northeast Frontier Railways was created and Badarpur Junction came under it.

== Successors ==
With the partition of India in 1947, portions of the Assam Bengal Railway which lay in Assam and the Indian part of North Bengal became Assam Railway. North Eastern Railway was formed in 1952 by amalgamating Assam Railway with Oudh Tirhut Railway and Fatehgarh district of Bombay, Baroda and Central India Railway. Northeast Frontier Railway was carved out of North Eastern Railway in 1958.

The portion of the system which fell within the boundary of erstwhile East Pakistan was named as Eastern Bengal Railway. On 1 February 1961, Eastern Bengal Railway was renamed as Pakistan Railway and in 1962 it became Pakistan Eastern Railway . With the emergence of Bangladesh, it became Bangladesh Railway.

After the independence of Pakistan on 15 August 1947 the broad-gauge portion of the Assam Bengal Railway, lying in India was added to the East Indian Railway and the metre-gauge portion became the Assam Railway, with its headquarters at Pandu. On 14 April 1952, the 2857 km-long Assam Railway and the Oudh and Tirhut Railway were amalgamated to form one of the six newly carved zones of the Indian Railways: the North Eastern Railway zone. On the same day, the reorganised Sealdah division of the erstwhile Bengal Assam Railway (which was added to the East Indian Railway earlier) was amalgamated with the Eastern Railway.

== Major trains ==
- Agartala - Anand Vihar Terminal Tejas Rajdhani Express
- Sairang-Anand Vihar Terminal Rajdhani Express
- Sir M. Visvesvaraya Terminal - Agartala Humsafar Express
- Lokmanya Tilak Terminus–Agartala AC Express
- Silchar–New Delhi Poorvottar Sampark Kranti Superfast Express
- Silchar - Thiruvananthapuram Aronai Express
- Silchar - Coimbatore Express
- Silchar–Charlapalli Express
- Rangiya–Silchar Express
- Guwahati - Silchar Express
- Silchar - Agartala Express
- Narangi - Agartala Express
- Guwahati–Dullabcherra Express
- Sealdah–Silchar Kanchanjunga Express
- Sealdah–Sabroom Kanchanjunga Express
- Agartala - Firozpur Cantonment Tripura Sundari Express
- Silchar - New Tinsukia Barak Brahmaputra Express
- Deoghar–Agartala Weekly Express
- Silchar-Kolkata Express
- Agartala-Guwahati Express
- Sairang-Guwahati Express
- Sairang-Kolkata Express
- Agartala- Raniya kamalapati (Habibganj) Express
- Agartala- Kolkata Garib Rath Express
- Agartala-Secunderabad Express
- Agartala- Khongsang Jan Statabdi Express

== See also ==
- North Eastern Railway Connectivity Project
- North Western Railway zone
