= Agartala railway station =

Railway Station in Tripura, India

Agartala
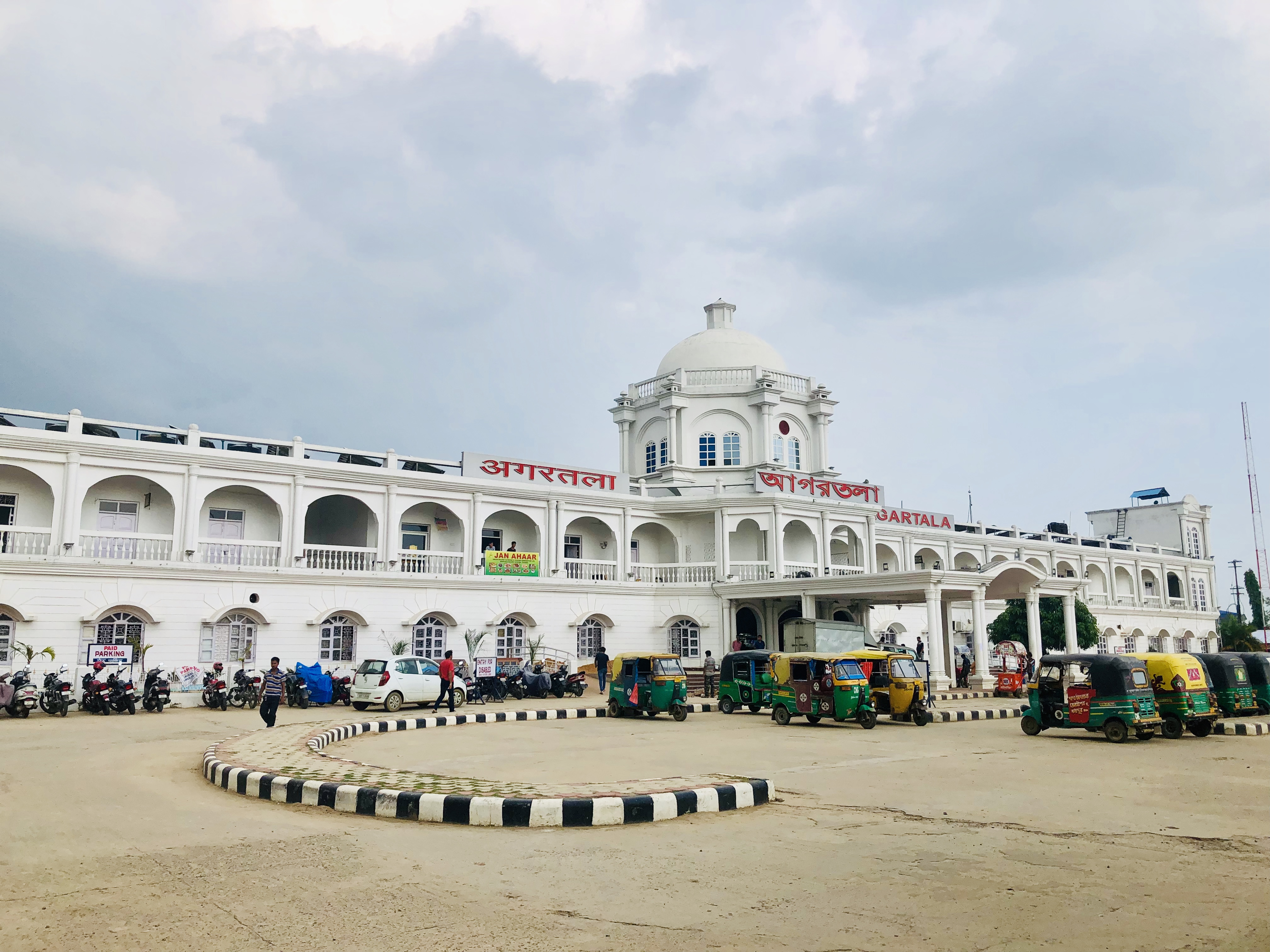
- Front view of Agartala railway station

General information
- Location: Badharghat, West Tripura district, Tripura; India
- Coordinates: 23°47′34″N 91°16′42″E
- Elevation: 25 m (82 ft)
- System: Regional rail and Light rail station
- Owner: Indian Railways
- Operator: Northeast Frontier Railways
- Line: Lumding–Sabroom section
- Platforms: 3
- Tracks: 15
- Connections: Taxi, Auto rickshaw, Bus

Construction
- Structure type: At grade
- Parking: Available
- Cycle facilities: Available
- Accessible: Yes

Other information
- Status: Active
- Station code: AGTL
- Zone(s): Northeast Frontier
- Division(s): Lumding

History
- Opened: 2008
- Rebuilt: 2016; 10 years ago

Passengers
- 15K/Day (▲ high)
Route map
Location
- Location within Tripura

Agartala Railway Station is located 5.5 km (3.4 mi) from Agartala in Tripura, India. It is the second capital city (after Guwahati, Assam) in northeast India to be connected to the country's railway map, moreover Agartala is the first state capital of independent India to be connected with a rail network. Before 2015 the 413-kilometre (257 mi) route was connected to Lumding with a metre-gauge track, but after the gauge conversion to broad gauge in 2016, the track is connected directly to Guwahati and the rest of India.

From Agartala an under-construction track has been on the way for a connection towards the extreme Southern end point of the state at Sabroom, which has been completed on 3 October 2019. A total of 21 constructed stations and few under-construction stations in the state, with Churaibari being the last one through the Northern side and Sabroom (functioning & completed) in the Southern side. The total length of track from the capital towards the North region's last station is approx. 153 km (95 mi), after which the territory of Assam starts. There are a lot of transportation modes available to reach the city from the station.

== History ==
The northeastern state capital came on India's railmap with the advent of the railways in the subcontinent in 1853. The foundation stone of the 119 km (74-mile) Kumarghat–Agartala railway project was laid in 1996 by the former Prime Minister H. D. Deve Gowda, and during the laying of rail lines, provisions were kept for swiftly converting it to broad gauge. 20 years time was taken by the Government since then to connect Agartala by rail.

== Construction ==
According to Tripura Chief Minister Manik Sarkar, the NFR had "spent Rs 900 crore ($190 million) to connect Agartala by rail by making three tunnels through the Longtharai Valley, Baramura and Atharamura Hills in Dhalai and West Tripura districts. The 1,962-metre (6,437 ft) Longtharai tunnel is the longest railway tunnel in eastern India." The architecture of the station resembles Ujjayanta Palace designed by architect Nabarun Biswas of A B Consultants Private Limited of Kolkata.

== Broad-gauge ==
Agartala was scheduled to get broad-gauge facility by March 2016. Works for conversion in BG from a small metre-gauge track from Lumding to Silchar in Assam was completed in March 2015 Freight services to Agartala had already resumed by then. It was 31 July 2016 when Suresh Prabhu the then Railway Minister of India inaugurated the Agartala–New Delhi 'Tripura Sundari Express', linking the broad gauge with the rest of India. On 28 October 2017 Rajdhani Express was inaugurated from Agartala to Anand Vihar Terminal.

== Link with Bangladesh ==
Government of Bangladesh and Government of India signed a Memorandum of Understanding (MoU) on 21 May 2013 for linking Agartala and Akhaura railway stations to connect Bangladesh Railway with the northeastern states. The total length of the track will be 15.054 km, of which only 5 km falls on the Indian side with the remaining track in Bangladesh. The tracks would be laid in metre gauge on broad-gauge format so that it could be converted into broad gauge when necessary.

The project is funded by India and is expected to cost around Rs 271 crore.

== See also ==
- North Eastern Railway Connectivity Project
- North Western Railway zone
