= Northeast Frontier Railway zone =

Indian railway zone

Northeast Frontier Railway

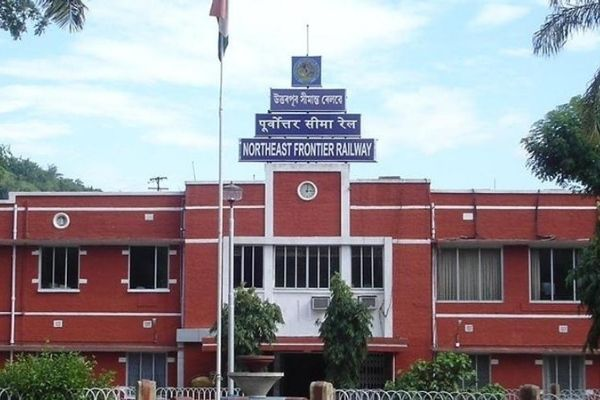
- N.F. Railway Headquarter, Maligaon

Overview
- Headquarters: Maligaon, Guwahati
- Locale: Assam, West Bengal, Nagaland, Tripura, Sikkim, Manipur, Mizoram, Arunachal Pradesh, Meghalaya, Bihar
- Dates of operation: 15 January 1958; 68 years ago–
- Predecessor: North Eastern Railway

Technical
- Track gauge: Broad gauge Narrow gauge
- Previous gauge: Metre gauge

Other
- Website: North East Frontier Railway website

The Northeast Frontier Railway (abbreviated NFR) is one of the 19 railway zones of the Indian Railways. It is headquartered in Maligaon, Guwahati in the state of Assam, and responsible for operation and expansion of rail network all across Northeastern states and some districts of eastern Bihar and northern West Bengal.

== Divisions ==
Northeast Frontier Railway is divided into 5 divisions:

- Katihar railway division
- Alipurduar railway division
- Lumding railway division
- Rangiya railway division
- Tinsukia railway division

Each of these divisions is headed by a Divisional Railway Manager, a Senior Administrative Grade officer of the rank of Joint Secretary to Government of India. The departmental setup at headquarters level and divisional setup in the field assists the General Manager in running the railways. Various departments namely engineering, mechanical, electrical, signal & telecom, operations, commercial, safety, accounts, security, personal and medical are headed by a Senior Administrative Grade / Higher Administrative Grade officer, provide technical and operational support to the divisions in train operations.

== History ==
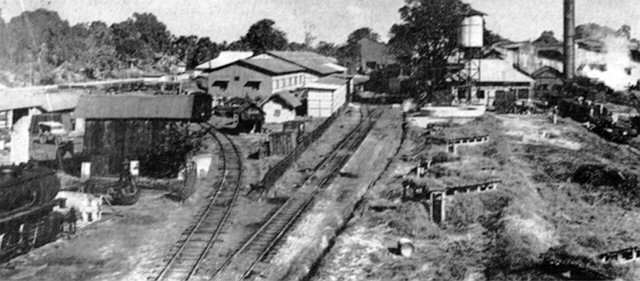
Dibrugarh Railway Yard 1943

In 1881, the Assam Railway and Trading Company opened a metre gauge line 65 kilometres (40 mi) long from Dibrugarh to Makum. This company later started the first passenger train in Assam by the name of Dibru–Sadiya Railway. The North Eastern Railway was formed on 14 April 1952 by amalgamating two railway systems: the Assam Railway and Oudh and Tirhut Railway. Later, it was bifurcated into two railway zones on 15 January 1958, the North Eastern Railway and the Northeast Frontier Railway. to better serve the needs of the northeastern states.

== Operational area ==
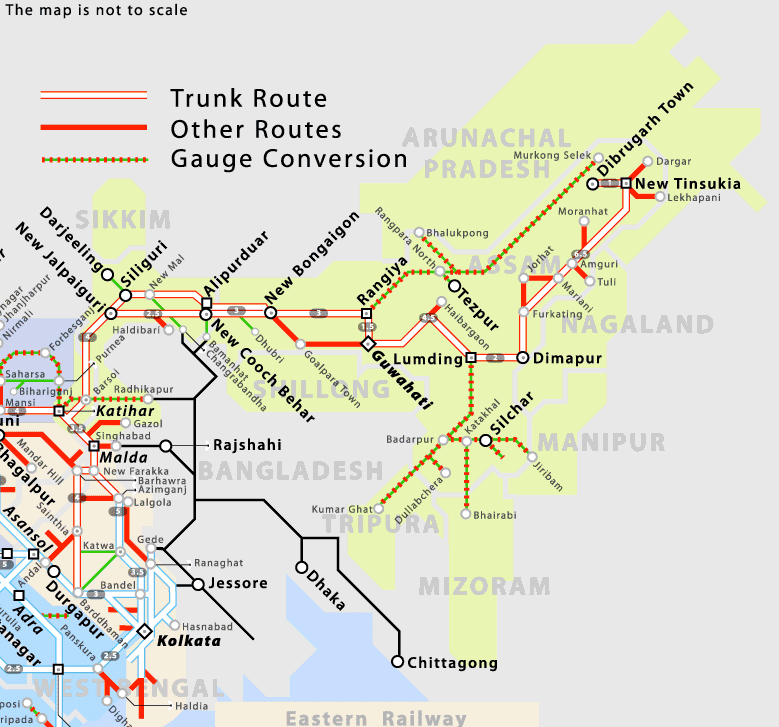
Map of Northeast Frontier Railway zone railway lines

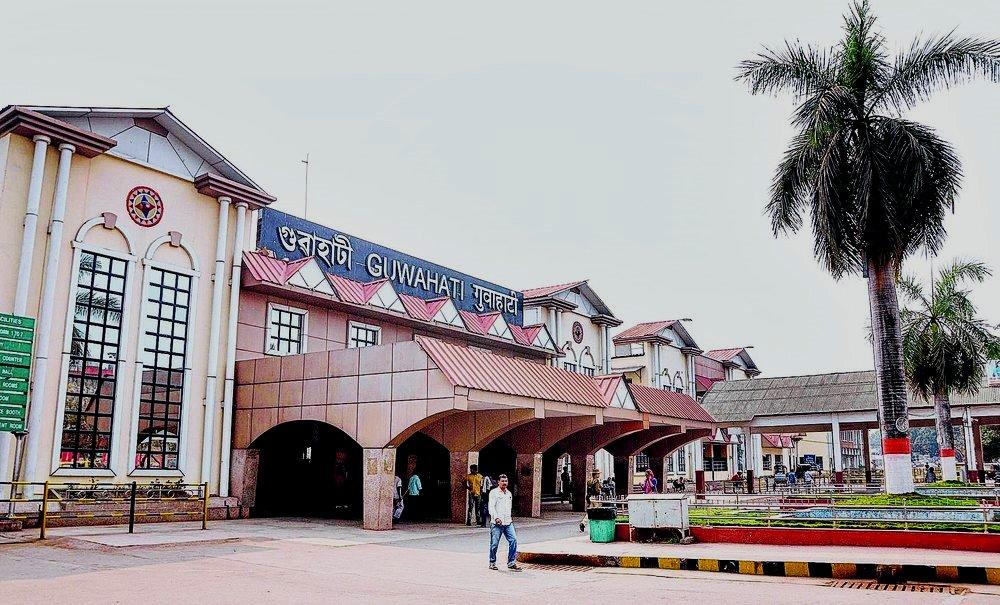
Guwahati railway station

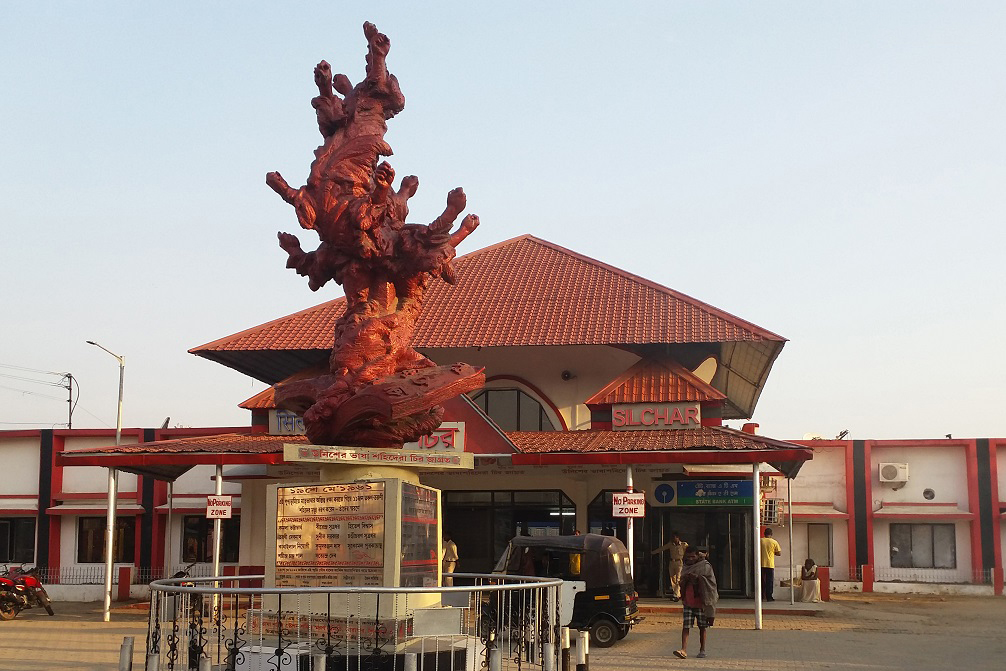
Silchar railway station

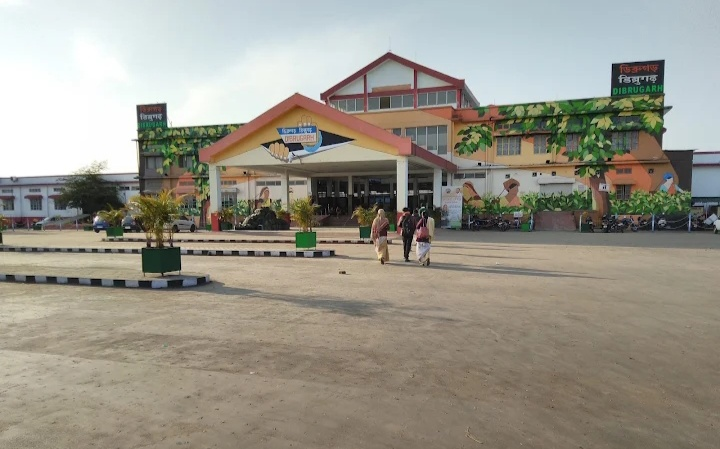
Dibrugarh railway station

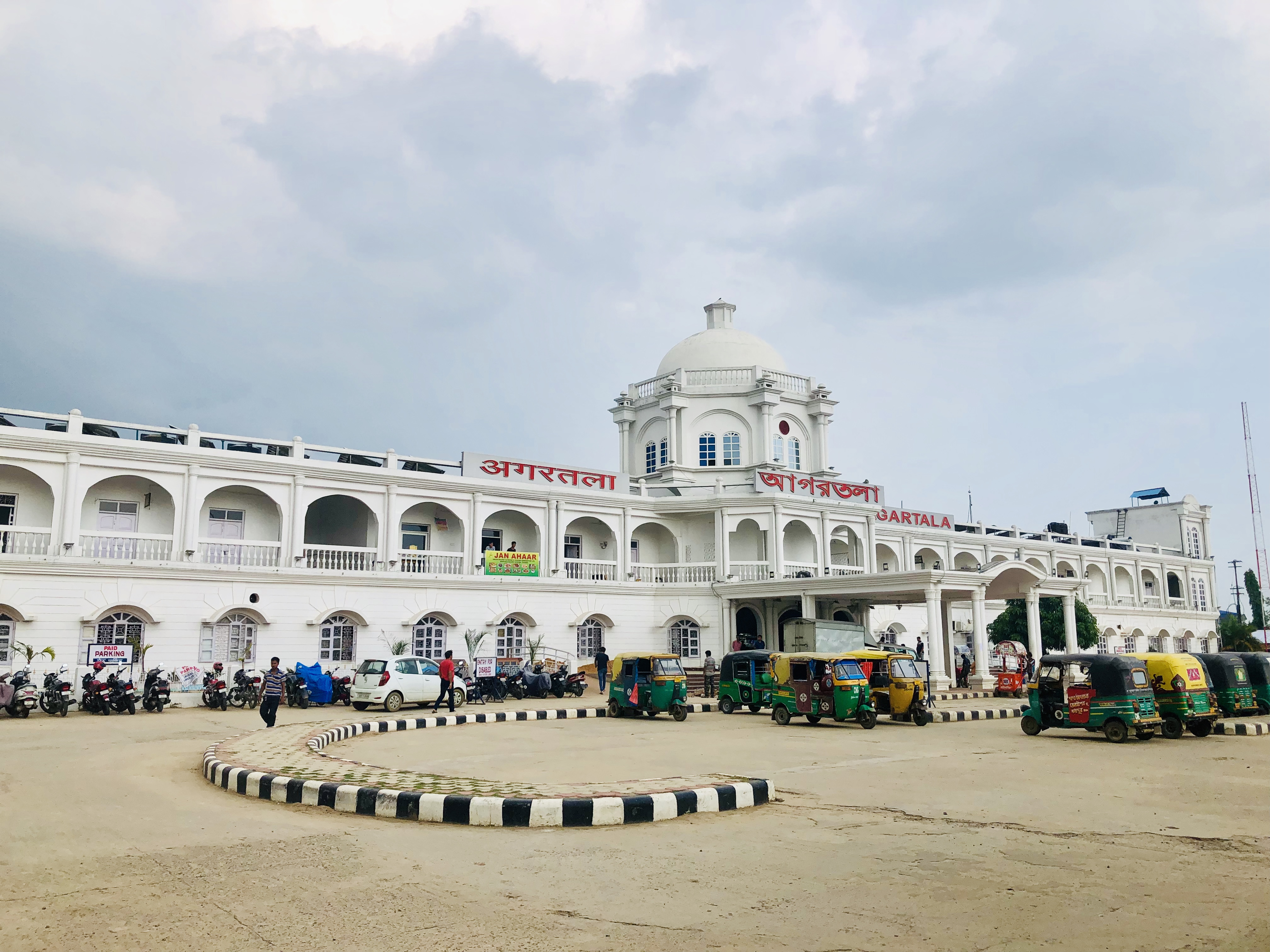
Agartala railway station

The area of Northeast Frontier Railway operations is characterized by exceptional beauty and at the same time by some of the most arduous terrain. This difficult terrain limits the rail network expansion, and the only state with a decent rail network is Assam. The network is not broad gauge in many parts and the rail lines are antiquated with speeds at some sections being limited to a maximum of 30 km/h (19 mph). Before the Saraighat Bridge was constructed, passengers had to get down on the Amingaon side of the Brahmaputra and take a ferry across to Pandu Junction from where they could resume their journey. The majority of the tracks have been converted to BG and electrification is in process starting from Katihar till Guwahati.

=== Major sections ===
A few of the major sections under the Northeast Frontier Railway zone are:

- Barsoi-Radhikapur branch line
- Eklakhi–Balurghat branch line
- New Bongaigaon–Guwahati section
- New Jalpaiguri–New Bongaigaon section
- Rangiya–Murkongselek section
- Guwahati–Lumding section
- Lumding–Dibrugarh section
- Silchar–Sabroom section
- Katihar–Siliguri section
- Jogbani–Katihar line
- Alipurduar–Bamanhat branch line
- New Jalpaiguri–Alipurduar–Samuktala Road line
- Barauni–Guwahati line

== Darjeeling Himalayan Railway ==
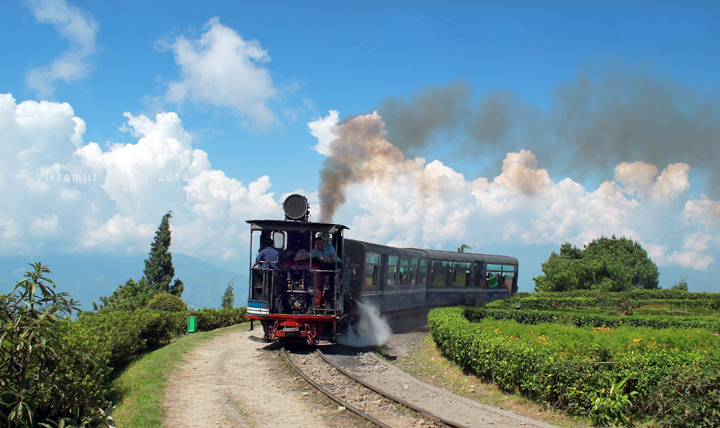
Darjeeling to Ghoom heritage narrow-gauge train

The Darjeeling Himalayan Railway is maintained and governed under the responsibility of Katihar division. It ascends 6,850 feet (2,090 m) from New Jalpaiguri; the climb begins at Sukna, continues uninterruptedly to Ghum (7,407 ft or 2,258 m) and descends the final 5 miles (8.0 km) to Darjeeling. After independence, India's partition resulted in the isolation of the Northeast region. Consequently, the DHR was merged into Assam Railways, it was closed for the construction of the Assam–Bengal link line and one of its extension lines to Kishanganj was converted to metre gauge. DHR's other extension line to Kalimpong was washed away due to floods. On reopening, the DHR was merged with North Eastern Railway in 1952 and later into Northeast Frontier Railway in 1958.

The DHR achieved worldwide fame for many reasons such as:

- A gateway to the Himalayas
- The tiny four-wheeled steam locomotives of the 19th century
- The curves, loops, "Z"s and steep grades crisscrossing the road

An interest in DHR all along has ensured that it continues to operate notwithstanding very heavy losses. The steam locomotive is an icon of this Railway. Tindharia workshop has kept 13 locomotives surviving, some of which are over 100 years old and the youngest is about 70 years old.

Timeline of DHR:

- 20 January 1948: Purchased by the Government of India
- 26 January 1948: Transferred to Assam Rail Link
- 26 January 1950: Transferred to Assam Railway
- 14 January 1952: Transferred to North Eastern Railway
- 15 January 1958: Transferred to Northeast Frontier Railway

== Major Trains ==
Number	Train Name	Starting Station	Terminating Station
12423/12424; 20503/20504; 20505/20506	Dibrugarh Rajdhani Express	Dibrugarh	New Delhi
22503/22504	Dibrugarh–Kanyakumari Vivek Express	Dibrugarh	Kanyakumari
15909/15910	Avadh Assam Express	Dibrugarh	Lalgarh
15657/15658	Brahmaputra Mail	Kamakhya	Old Delhi
20507/20508	Sairang Rajdhani Express	Sairang	Anand Vihar Terminal
20501/20502	Agartala Tejas Rajdhani Express	Agartala	Anand Vihar Terminal
12504/12503	Agartala–SMVT Bengaluru Humsafar Express	Agartala	SMVT Bengaluru Terminal
15959/15960; 15961/15962	Kamrup Express	Dibrugarh	Howrah
15645/15646	Silchar–Charlapalli Express	Silchar	Charlapalli
15645/15646	Guwahati-Lokmanya Tilak Terminus	Guwahati	Lokmanya Tilak Terminus
12519/12520	Lokmanya Tilak Terminus–Agartala AC Express	Agartala	Lokmanya Tilak Terminus
15645/15646	Lokmanya Tilak Terminus–Dibrugarh Express	Dibrugarh	Lokmanya Tilak Terminus
12507/12508	Aronai Express	Thiruvananthapuram	Silchar
12509/12510	Guwahati-SMVT Bengaluru Superfast Express	Guwahati	SMVT Bengaluru
15903/15904	Dibrugarh-Chandigarh Express	Dibrugarh	Chandigarh
15933/15934	New Tinsukia–Amritsar Express	New Tinsukia	Amritsar
15635/15636	Dwarka Express	Guwahati	Okha
15653/15654	Amarnath Express	Guwahati	Jammu Tawi
15655/15656	Kamakhya–Shri Mata Vaishno Devi Katra Express	Guwahati	Shri Mata Vaishno Devi Katra
22511/22512	Kamakhya–Lokmanya Tilak Terminus Karmabhoomi Express	Kamakhya	Lokmanya Tilak Terminus
12505/12506	North East Express	Kamakhya	Anand Vihar Terminal
12487/12488	Seemanchal Express	Jogbani	Anand Vihar Terminal
15667/15668	Kamakhya–Gandhidham Superfast Express	Kamakhya	Gandhidham
15655/15656	New Tinsukia–SMVT Bengaluru Superfast Express	New Tinsukia	SMVT Bengaluru
15929/15930	New Tinsukia–Tambaram Express	New Tinsukia	Tambaram
15617/15618	Guwahati–Dullabcherra Express	Guwahati	Dullabcherra
13125/13126	Sairang Kolkata Express	Sairang	Kolkata
12517/12518	Guwahati-Kolkata Garib Rath Express	Guwahati	Kolkata
12501/12502	Agartala-Kolkata Garib Rath Express	Agartala	Kolkata
13173/13174	Sabroom-Sealdah Kanchanjungha Express	Sabroom	Sealdah
13175/13176	Silchar-Sealdah Kanchanjungha Express	Silchar	Sealdah

== Loco sheds ==
- Diesel Loco Shed, Siliguri
- Diesel & Electric Loco Shed, Malda Town
- Diesel Loco Shed, New Guwahati
- Diesel Loco Shed, Mariani

== Sicklines & Pitlines ==
- Dibrugarh Coaching Depot, Dibrugarh
- Pitline, Dibrugarh
- N.F.Railway Mechanical Workshop, Dibrugarh
- Coach Maintenance Depot/Sickline, Guwahati
- Pitline, Guwahati
- Pitline, New Guwahati
- New Bongaigaon Carriage & Wagon Workshop, New Bongaigaon
- Coach Maintenance Depot, Kamakhya
- Automatic Coach Washing Pitline, Kamakhya
- Silchar Coaching Depot, Silchar
- Pitline, Silchar
- DEMU cum Sick Shed, Agartala
- Pitline, Agartala
- Routine Overhaul(ROH) Depot, New Tinsukia
- Tinsukia Carriage Depot, Tinsukia
- New Coaching Depot/Sickline, Katihar
- Pitline, Balurghat
- Coach Maintenance Depot, New Jalpaiguri
- Routine Overhaul(ROH) Depot, New Jalpaiguri
- DEMU Car Shed, Siliguri
- DEMU Shed, Lumding

== Major stations ==
These are the major railway station which have large numbers of passenger frequencies and stoppages of trains in the zone.

List of major railway stations in Northeast Frontier Railway Zone of Indian Railways
Sl. No.	Name of station	Station code	Division
1	Guwahati	GHY	Lumding
2	Silchar	SCL	Lumding
3	Dibrugarh	DBRG	Tinsukia
4	Rangiya Junction	RNY	Rangiya
5	Kamakhya Junction	KYQ	Lumding
6	Lumding Junction	LMG	Lumding
7	Mariani Junction	MXN	Tinsukia
8	Badarpur Junction	BPB	Lumding
9	Dimapur	DMV	Lumding
10	New Tinsukia Junction	NTSK	Tinsukia
11	Karimganj Junction	KXJ	Lumding
12	Rangapara North Junction	RPAN	Rangiya
13	New Bongaigaon Junction	NBQ	Rangiya
14	New Alipurduar	NOQ	Alipurduar
15	New Cooch Behar Junction	NCB	Alipurduar
16	Alipurduar Junction	APDJ	Aipurduar
17	New Jalpaiguri Junction	NJP	Katihar
18	Katihar Junction	KIR	Katihar
19	Purnia Junction	PRNA	Katihar
20	Agartala	AGTL	Lumding
21	Siliguri Junction	SGUJ	Katihar
22	Jalpaiguri Road railway station	JPE	Alipurduar
23	Dhupguri railway station	DQG	Alipurduar
24	Naharlagun railway station	NHLN	Rangiya

== See also ==
- North Eastern Railway Connectivity Project
- All India Station Masters' Association
- Zones and divisions of Indian Railways
- Northeast Frontier Railway Stadium
