= Kanchanjungha Express =

Train in India

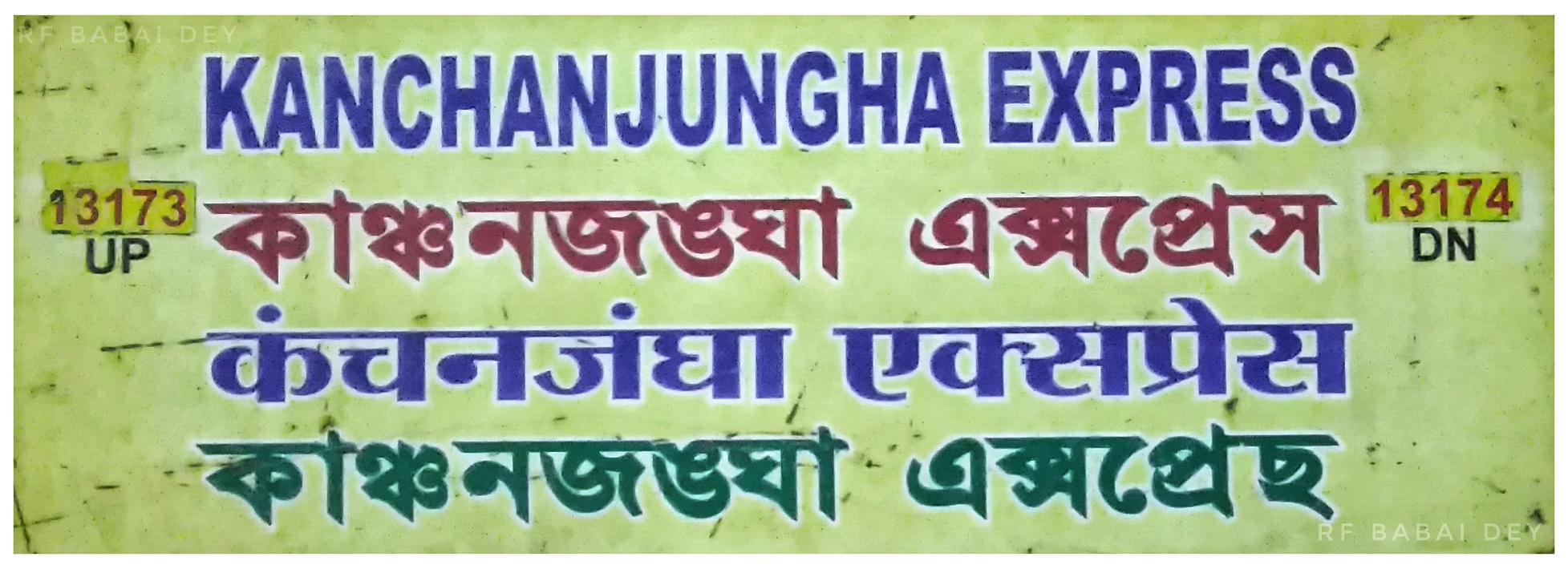
- Kanchanjungha Express train board.

Overview
- Service type: Express
- Locale: West Bengal, Jharkhand, Bihar, Assam and Tripura
- Current operator: Eastern Railway zone

Route
- Termini: Sealdah; Silchar; Sabroom
- Stops: 49 stops for 13173/74 38 stops for 13175/76
- Distance travelled: 1,360–1,552 km (845–964 mi)
- Average journey time: 21 h 25 m
- Service frequency: 13175-76 Three days a week 13173-74 Four days a week.
- Train numbers: 13173/13174 and 13175/13176

On-board services
- Classes: AC 2 Tier, AC 3 Tier, Sleeper Class, Chair Car, Unreserved (2S in Covid Period)
- Seating arrangements: Available
- Sleeping arrangements: Available
- Catering facilities: Available
- Baggage facilities: Available

Technical
- Rolling stock: LHB coach
- Track gauge: 1,676 mm (5 ft 6 in)
- Operating speed: Average 53 km/h

Kanchanjungha Express is an Express train of Indian Railways linking the states of West Bengal with Assam and Tripura. There are two Kanchanjungha Express they are 13175/76 Sealdah–Silchar Kanchanjungha Express and 13173/74 Sealdah–Sabroom Kanchanjunga Express

The train runs between Sealdah, Silchar and Sabroom.

13175/76 runs triweekly from Silchar, 13173/74 runs four times a week from Sabroom. Tatkal scheme is available in it.

It is named after the Kangchenjunga peak of the Himalayan Mountains of Sikkim.

== Route and halts ==
The important halts of the train are:

- Sealdah
- Dakshineswar
- Barddhaman Junction
- Bolpur Shantiniketan
- Ahmadpur Junction
- Sainthia Junction
- Rampurhat Junction
- Murarai
- Pakur
- New Farakka Junction
- Malda Town
- Samsi
- Azamnagar Road
- Barsoi Junction
- Dalkhola
- Kishanganj
- Aluabari Road Junction
- New Jalpaiguri (Siliguri)
- Jalpaiguri Road
- New Maynaguri (Note: Halts for 13173/74) (Halts for Sealdah–Sabroom Kanchanjungha Express)
- Dhupguri
- Falakata
- New Cooch Behar
- New Alipurduar
- Kamakhyaguri Railway Station
- Gossaigaon Hat
- Fakiragram Junction
- Kokrajhar
- Basugaon (Halts for Sealdah–Sabroom Kanchanjungha Express)
- New Bongaigaon Junction
- Barpeta Road
- Rangiya Junction
- Kamakhya Junction
- Guwahati
- Hojai (Halts for Sealdah–Sabroom Kanchanjungha Express)
- Lanka (Halts for Sealdah–Sabroom Kanchanjungha Express)
- Lumding Junction (Directional Reversal)
- New Haflong
- Bihara
- Badarpur Junction (Loco Reversal for Sealdah -Silchar Kanchanjunga Express)
- New Karimganj
- Patharkandi
- Dharmanagar
- Kumarghat
- Ambassa
- Agartala
- Udaipur
- Belonia
- Jolaibari
- Silchar/Sabroom

== Traction ==
It is hauled by a Sealdah-based WAP-7, Howrah based WAP-7 or Howrah based WAP-4 from Sealdah to Lumding and vice-versa. From Lumding to Silchar/Sabroom it is hauled by twin WDP-4D or WDG-4D diesel locomotives of Siliguri shed. Also due to ghat section, banker locomotive are attached to it.

== Rake sharing ==
Sealdah–Silchar Kanchenjunga Express shares its rake with Sealdah–Sabroom Kanchanjunga Express.

== Accidents ==
On 17 June 2024, Kanchanjungha Express was involved in an accident near New Jalpaiguri station in West Bengal. It was reported that the train was hit behind by Freight train resulting of derailed 3 rear carriages, 15 death and 30 injured. As per the Chief Commissioner of Railway Safety (CCRS), the accident was because of multiple lapses in train operations management in automatic signal zones and "inadequate counselling" of loco pilots and station masters.

== See also ==
- Guwahati railway station
- Sealdah railway station
- Sealdah–Silchar Kanchenjunga Express
- Sealdah–Sabroom Kanchanjunga Express

=== Other trains on the Kolkata – New Jalpaiguri sector ===
- 22301/02 Howrah–New Jalpaiguri Vande Bharat Express
- 12041/42 New Jalpaiguri–Howrah Shatabdi Express
- 22309/40 Howrah–New Jalpaiguri AC Express
- 12377/78 Padatik Express
- 12344/45 Darjeeling Mail
- 15959/60 Kamrup Express
- 13175/76 Kanchanjunga Express/Sealdah–Agartala Kanchanjunga Express
- 12345/46 Saraighat Express
- 15722/23 New Jalpaiguri–Digha Express
- 12517/18 Kolkata – Guwahati Garib Rath Express
- 12501/02 Kolkata – Agartala Garib Rath Express
- 12526/27 Dibrugarh–Kolkata Superfast Express
- 13141/42 Teesta Torsha Express
- 13147/58 Uttar Banga Express
- 12503/04 Bangalore Cantonment–Agartala Humsafar Express
- 13182/83 Silghat Town- Kolkata Express
- 22511/12 Lokmanya Tilak Terminus–Kamakhya Karmabhoomi Express
- 12526/27 Dibrugarh–Kolkata Superfast Express
- 15644/45 Puri–Kamakhya Weekly Express (via Howrah)
- 12364/65 Kolkata–Haldibari Intercity Express
- 12509/10 Guwahati–Bengaluru Cantt. Superfast Express
- 12507/08 Thiruvananthapuram–Silchar Superfast Express
- 12514/15 Guwahati–Secunderabad Express
