= New Haflong railway station =

Railway station in Assam, India

New Haflong
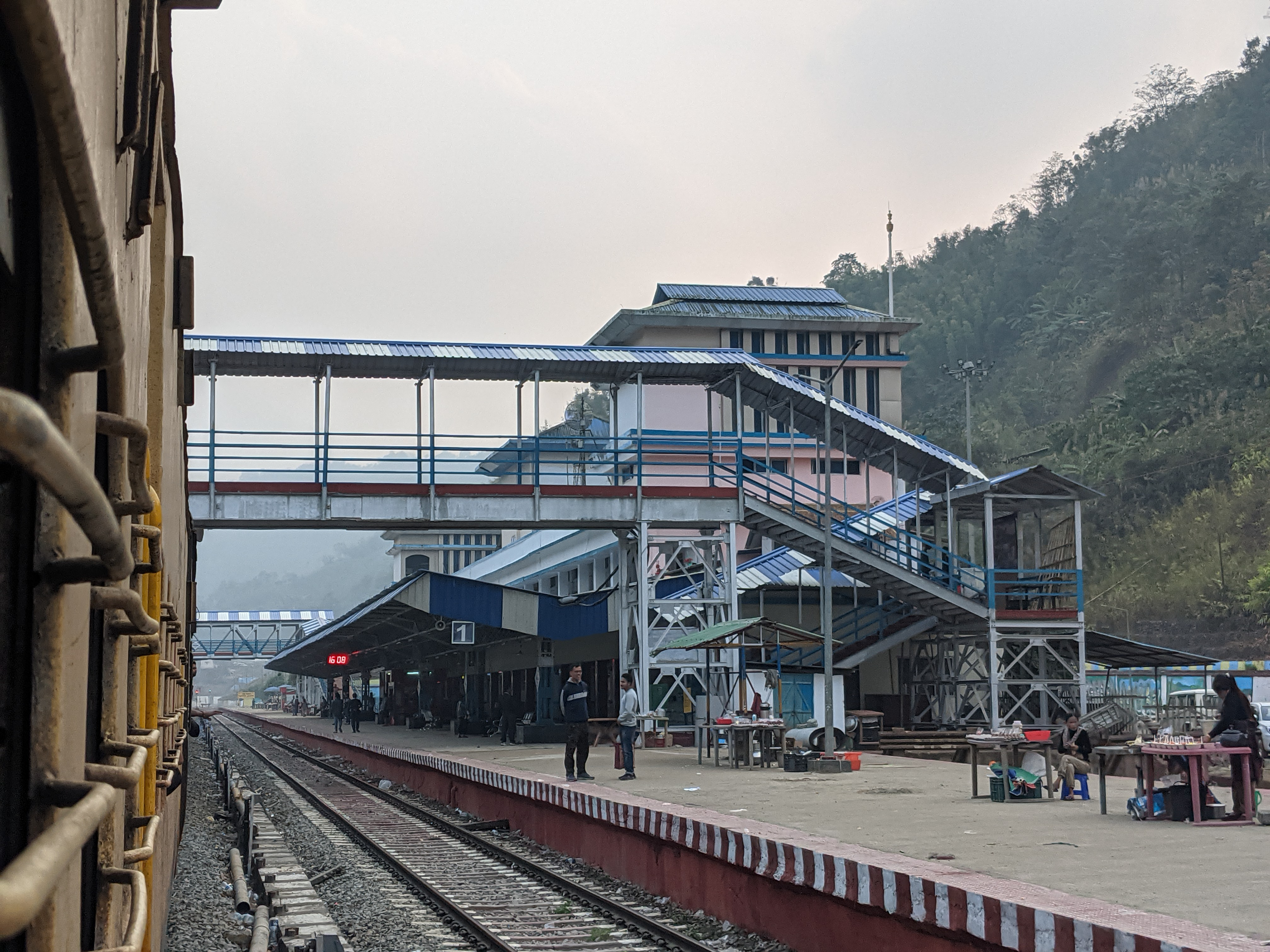
- New Haflong railway station

General information
- Location: New Halflong Station Road, Haflong, Dima Hasao district, Assam; India
- Coordinates: 25.1481°N 93.0319°E
- Elevation: 446 metres (1,463 ft)
- System: Hill Station Indian Railways station
- Owner: Indian Railways
- Operator: Northeast Frontier
- Platforms: 3
- Tracks: 4

Construction
- Structure type: Standard (on ground station)
- Parking: No
- Cycle facilities: No

Other information
- Status: Functioning
- Station code: NHLG
- Zone(s): Northeast Frontier Railway
- Division(s): Lumding
Location
- Location within Assam Location within India

New Haflong railway station is a main railway station in Dima Hasao district, Assam. Its code is NHLG. It serves Haflong town.

== Station ==
The station consists of three platforms. New Haflong lies on Lumding–Sabroom section provides the rail connectivity in Haflong with Guwahati and Silchar.

== Incidents ==
In 2022, following heavy rainfall in and around the town and Dima Hasao district, the train station was submerged and a train parked at the station was derailed.

== Major trains ==
Some of the important trains that runs from New Haflong are :

1. New Delhi - Agartala Tejas Rajdhani Express
2. Sir M. Visvesvaraya Terminal - Agartala Humsafar Express
3. Lokmanya Tilak Terminus–Agartala AC Express
4. Silchar–New Delhi Poorvottar Sampark Kranti Superfast Express
5. Silchar - Thiruvananthapuram Aronai Superfast Express
6. Silchar - Coimbatore Superfast Express
7. Silchar–Secunderabad Express
8. Silchar - Sealdah Kanchanjunga Express
9. Agartala - Firozpur Cantonment Tripura Sundari Express
10. Agartala - Deoghar Weekly Express
11. Agartala - Sealdah Kanchanjunga Express
12. Silchar - New Tinsukia Barak Brahmaputra Express
13. Rangiya–Silchar Express
14. Guwahati–Dullabcherra Express
