= Sealdah–Sabroom Kanchanjungha Express =

Express train in India

Sealdah - Sabroom Kanchanjunga Express
Overview
- Service type: Express
- Locale: West Bengal, Bihar, Assam and Tripura
- First service: 9 October 2016; 10 years ago
- Current operator: Eastern Railway zone

Route
- Termini: Sealdah (SDAH); Sabroom (SBRM)
- Stops: 50
- Distance travelled: 1,659 km (1,031 mi)
- Average journey time: 35h 20m
- Service frequency: 4 days a week (Note: Runs two days in a week for every direction.)
- Train number: 13173/13174

On-board services
- Classes: AC 2 tier, AC 3 tier, Sleeper class, General Unreserved
- Seating arrangements: No
- Sleeping arrangements: Yes
- Catering facilities: On-board catering E-catering
- Observation facilities: LHB coach (From 28 Nov.2025)
- Entertainment facilities: No
- Baggage facilities: No
- Other facilities: Below the seats

Technical
- Rolling stock: 4
- Track gauge: 1,676 mm (5 ft 6 in)
- Operating speed: 45 km/h (28 mph), including halts
Route map
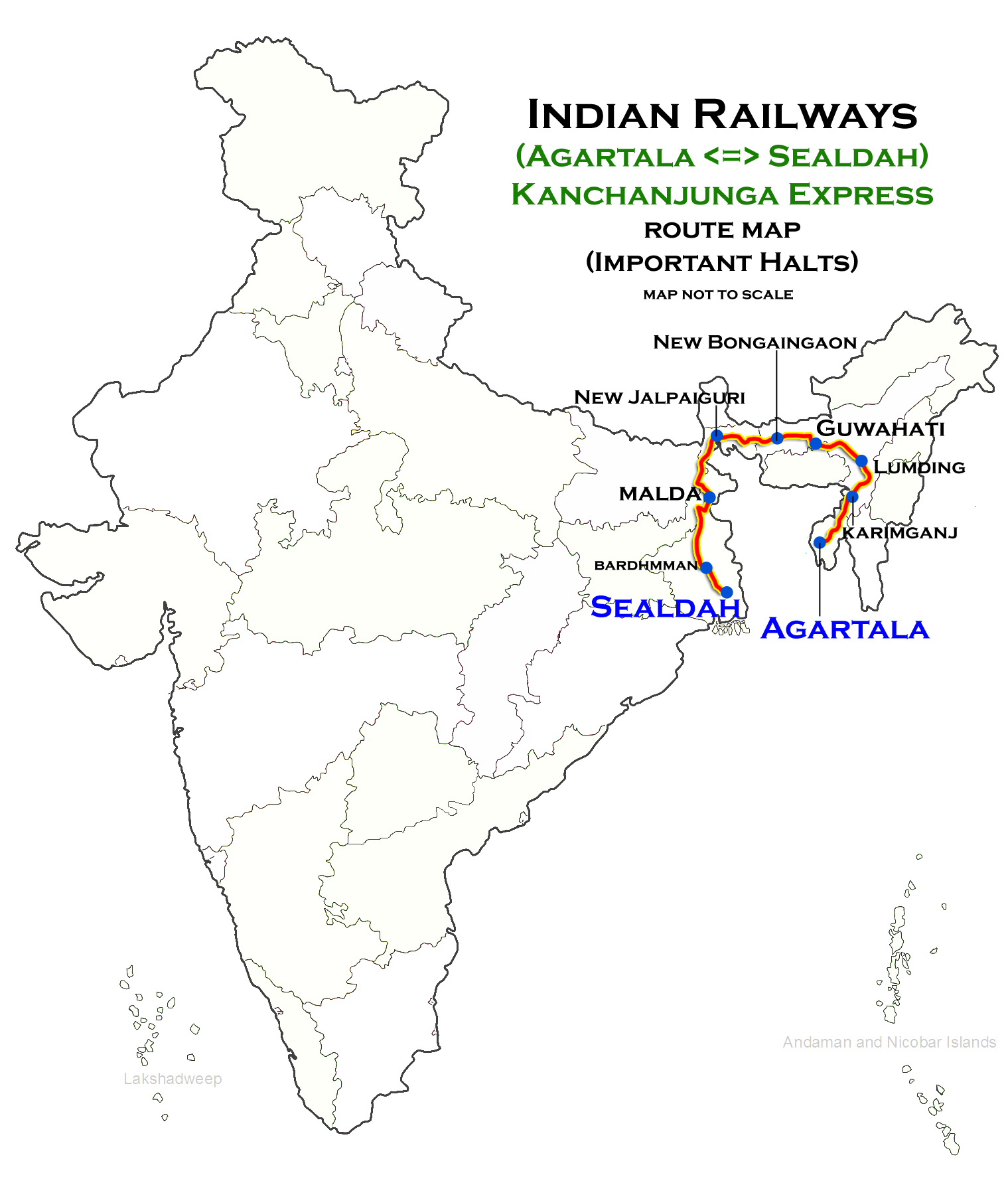

Sealdah - Sabroom Kanchanjunga Express is an Express train belonging to Eastern Railway zone that runs between Sealdah (Kolkata) and Sabroom (Tripura) in India via Barddhaman, Rampurhat, Malda Town, New Jalpaiguri, Guwahati. It is currently operated with 13173/13174 train numbers on a four-days-a-week basis. It previously ran between Sealdah and Agartala, and was later extended to run to Sabroom.

It is named after the Kangchenjunga peak of the Himalayan Mountains of Sikkim which is visible from New Jalpaiguri, as previously when this train was introduced in the 1960s it was between Sealdah and New Jalpaiguri (Siliguri).

== Major halts ==
The important halts of the train are:

- Sealdah
- Dakshineswar
- Barddhaman Junction
- Bolpur Shantiniketan
- Ahmadpur Junction railway station
- Sainthia Junction
- Rampurhat Junction
- Murarai
- Pakur
- New Farakka Junction
- Malda Town
- Samsi
- Azamnagar Road
- Barsoi Junction
- Dalkhola
- Kishanganj railway station
- Aluabari Road Junction
- New Jalpaiguri (Siliguri)
- Jalpaiguri Road
- New Maynaguri
- Dhupguri
- Falakata
- New Cooch Behar
- New Alipurduar
- Kamakhyaguri Railway Station
- Gossaigaon Hat
- Fakiragram Junction
- Kokrajhar
- Basugaon
- New Bongaigaon Junction
- Barpeta Road
- Rangiya Junction
- Kamakhya Junction
- Guwahati
- Hojai
- Lanka
- Lumding Junction (Loco Reversal)
- Maibang
- New Haflong
- Bihara
- Badarpur Junction
- Karimganj
- Dharmanagar
- Kumarghat
- Ambassa
- Agartala
- Udaipur
- Belonia
- Jolaibari
- Sabroom

== Traction ==
since the route fully electrified, this train continue run with WDG-4D and WAP-7

== Accident ==
On 17 June 2024, around 9:00 IST a goods train collided with Kanchanjunga Express from the rear end resulting in the derailment of three coaches. Ten people lost their lives in the incident while more than 60 people got injured. The cause of collision is currently under investigation.

== See also ==
- Agartala railway station
- Sealdah railway station
- Sealdah–Silchar Kanchenjunga Express
- Kanchenjunga Express

== Other trains on the Kolkata–New Jalpaiguri sector ==
- 12041/42 New Jalpaiguri–Howrah Shatabdi Express
- 22309/10 Howrah–New Jalpaiguri AC Express
- 12377/78 Padatik Express
- 12343/44 Darjeeling Mail
- 15959/60 Kamrup Express
- 13175/76 Kanchanjungha Express/Sealdah–Silchar Kanchanjunga Express
- 12345/46 Saraighat Express
- 13125/13126 Kolkata–Sairang Express
- 13115/13116 Sealdah - Jalpaiguri Road Humsafar Express
- 15721/22 New Jalpaiguri–Digha Express
- 12517/18 Kolkata–Guwahati Garib Rath Express
- 12525/26 Dibrugarh–Kolkata Superfast Express
- 13141/42 Teesta Torsha Express
- 13147/48 Uttar Banga Express
- 12503/04 Bangalore Cantonment–Agartala Humsafar Express
- 13181/82 Kolkata–Silghat Town Kaziranga Express
- 22511/12 Lokmanya Tilak Terminus–Kamakhya Karmabhoomi Express
- 15643/44 Puri–Kamakhya Weekly Express (via Howrah)
- 12363/64 Kolkata–Haldibari Intercity Express
- 12509/10 Guwahati–Bengaluru Cantt. Superfast Express
- 12507/08 Thiruvananthapuram–Silchar Superfast Express
- 12513/14 Guwahati–Secunderabad Express
