= Lumding Junction railway station =

Railway station in Assam, India

Lumding Jn.

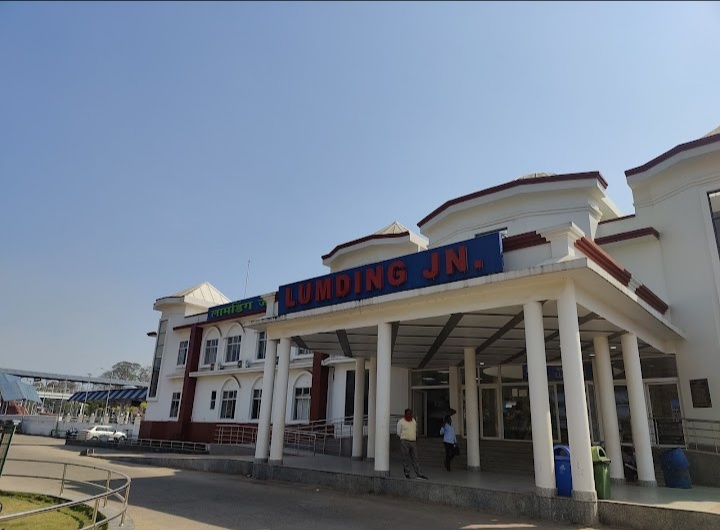
- Lumding Junction Railway Station

General information
- Location: Station Road, Lumding, Hojai-782447, Assam; India
- Coordinates: 25°45′01″N 93°10′37″E
- Elevation: 142 metres (466 ft)
- System: Commuter rail & Regional rail
- Owner: Indian Railways
- Operator: Northeast Frontier Railway
- Lines: Guwahati–Lumding section; Lumding–Dibrugarh section; Lumding–Badarpur section
- Platforms: 5
- Tracks: 14
- Connections: Auto-rickshaw

Construction
- Structure type: At grade
- Parking: Available
- Cycle facilities: Available
- Accessible: Yes

Other information
- Status: Functioning
- Station code: LMG
- Zone(s): Northeast Frontier
- Division(s): Lumding

History
- Opened: 1903
- Former names: Assam Bengal Railway

Passengers
- 50K/Day (▲ high)

Services
Location
- Location within Assam

Lumding Junction Railway Station serves the Indian city of Lumding in Assam. It is the divisional headquarter of Lumding railway division of Northeast Frontier Railway zone. It is located in Hojai district. It is the 2nd biggest railway station of Lumding railway division, after Guwahati. It is one of the oldest railway stations in India built under Assam Bengal Railway. It consists of 5 platforms with a total of 68 halting trains and 3 originating trains. The station consists of double diesel line.

== History ==
In the pre-partition days, Assam was linked to Chittagong through the Akhaura–Kulaura–Chhatak line and Akhaura–Laksam–Chittagong line. The Chittagong link had been constructed in response to the demand of the Assam tea planters for a railway link to Chittagong port. Assam Bengal Railway started construction of a railway track on the eastern side of Bengal in 1891. A 150-kilometre-long (93 mi) track between Chittagong and Comilla was opened to traffic in 1895. The Comilla–Akhaura–Kulaura–Badarpur section was opened in 1896–1898 and extended to Lumding in 1903.

Assam Bengal Railway opened the Lumding–Guwahati line in 1900.

After independence and partition, the entire Guwahati–Lumding–Dibrugarh–Tinsukia sector was converted from metre gauge to broad gauge by 1997.

The Lumding–Silchar gauge conversion work was scheduled to be completed in March–April 2015.

== Amenities ==
Following services available in Lumding Jn. Railway Station:

- 02 (02 Bedded) AC Retiring Rooms with Free Wi-Fi/TV/Locker/Charging point
- 07 (02 Bedded) Non AC Retiring Rooms with Free Wi-Fi/TV/Locker
- 01 (08 Bedded) Non AC Dormitory with Free Wi-Fi/TV
- Executive Lounge
- High Speed Google Railwire Free Wi-Fi service
- Upper Class/Lower Class Waiting Rooms having Free Wi-Fi/AC/TV/Charging points/Drinking water & separate Ladies/Gents Washrooms
- Food Plaza
- Tea Stall
- FOB with 2X Escalator/Elevators 3X
- CCTV Surveillance

== Loco shed ==
There was a metre gauge loco shed at Lumding. When the entire Guwahati–Lumding–Dibrugarh line was converted to broad gauge, the Lumding–Badarpur–Silchar line has also been converted to broad gauge. The YDM-4 metre gauge locos from New Guwahati loco shed were transferred to Lumding. Recently, the metre-gauge shed is transformed to EMU shed.

== Lumding railway division ==
Lumding railway division was created on 1 May 1969.

== Major trains ==
1. New Delhi–Dibrugarh Rajdhani Express (Via New Tinsukia)
2. New Delhi–Dibrugarh Rajdhani Express (Via Moranhat)
3. Lokmanya Tilak Terminus–Agartala AC Express
4. Guwahati−Dibrugarh Shatabdi Express
5. Silchar–New Delhi Poorvottar Sampark Kranti Express
6. Dibrugarh–Kanyakumari Vivek Express
7. Silchar - Thiruvananthapuram Aronai Superfast Express
8. Silchar - Coimbatore Superfast Express
9. Sabroom - Sealdah Kanchanjunga Express
10. Agartala - Firozpur Tripura Sundari Express
11. New Tinsukia–Amritsar Express
12. Dibrugarh–Chandigarh Express
13. New Tinsukia–SMVT Bengaluru Superfast Express
14. Dibrugarh-Lalgarh Avadh Assam Express
15. Dibrugarh - Lokmanya Tilak Terminus Superfast Express
16. Dibrugarh-Howrah Kamrup Express via Guwahati
17. Silchar - Sealdah Kanchanjunga Express
18. Agartala - Deoghar Weekly Express
19. Dibrugarh–Rajendra Nagar Weekly Express
20. Guwahati–Jorhat Town Jan Shatabdi Express
21. Guwahati - Dibrugarh Town Nagaland Express
22. Rangiya–Silchar Express
23. Guwahati - Mariani BG Express
24. Alipurduar–Lumding Intercity Express
25. Silchar - New Tinsukia Barak Brahmaputra Express
26. Guwahati–Ledo Intercity Express
27. Rangiya–New Tinsukia Express
28. New Tinsukia - Darbhanga Jivacch Link Express

== See also ==
- North Eastern Railway Connectivity Project
- North Western Railway zone

Preceding station	Indian Railways	Following station
Patharkhola towards ?	Northeast Frontier Railway zone Guwahati–Lumding section	Terminus
Terminus	Northeast Frontier Railway zone Lumding–Dibrugarh section	Bar Langfer towards ?
Terminus	Northeast Frontier Railway zone Lumding–Sabroom section	Manderdisa towards ?
