= Himsagar Express =

Train in India

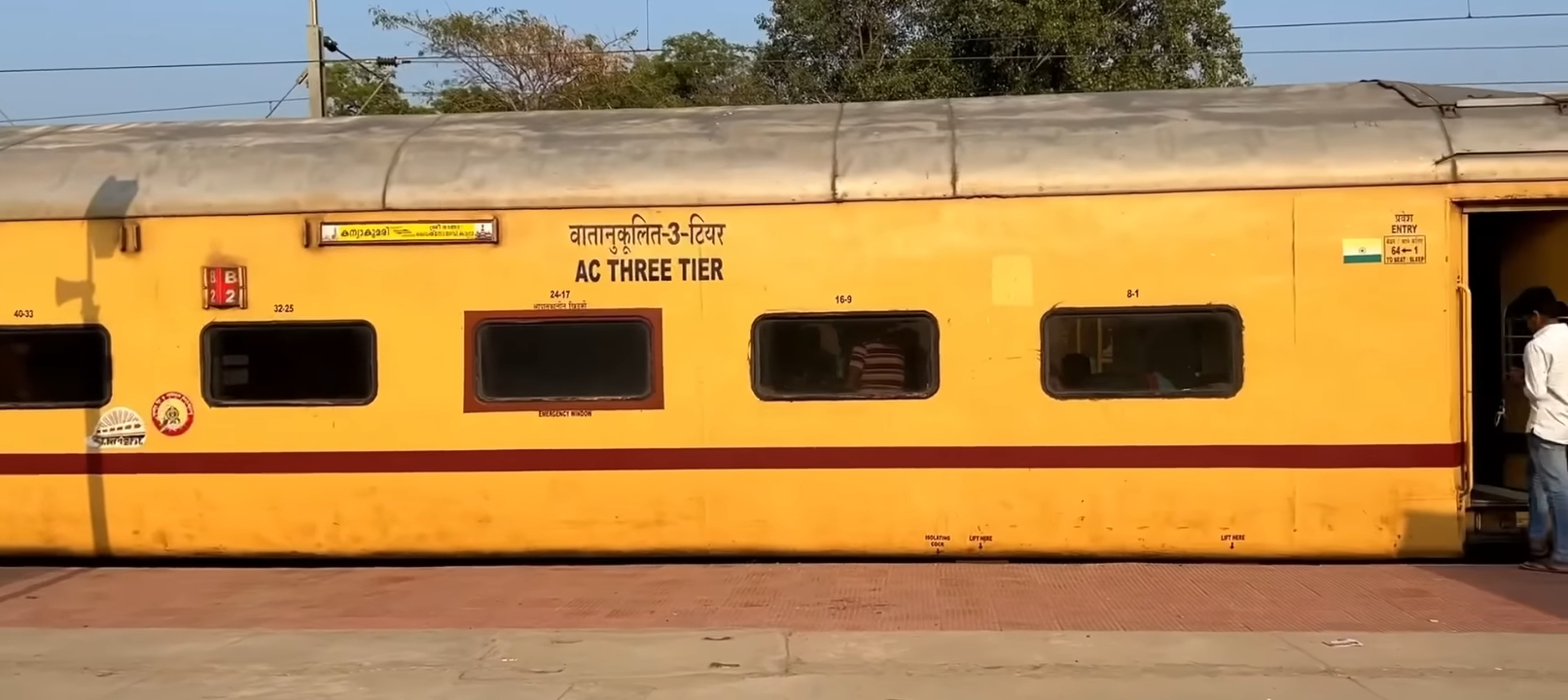
- Himsagar Express At Mathura Junction railway station

Overview
- Service type: Express
- First service: 3 October 1984; 41 years ago
- Current operator: Southern Railway

Route
- Termini: Shri Mata Vaishno Devi Katra (SVDK); Kanyakumari (CAPE)
- Stops: 63
- Distance travelled: 3,790 km (2,355 mi)
- Average journey time: 68 hrs 30 mins
- Service frequency: Weekly
- Train number: 16317 / 16318

On-board services
- Classes: AC 2 tier, AC 3 tier, Sleeper Class, General Unreserved
- Seating arrangements: Yes
- Sleeping arrangements: Yes
- Catering facilities: Available
- Observation facilities: Large windows
- Baggage facilities: Available
- Other facilities: Below the seats

Technical
- Rolling stock: LHB coach
- Track gauge: 1,676 mm (5 ft 6 in)
- Operating speed: 66 km/h (41 mph) average including halts.
Route map
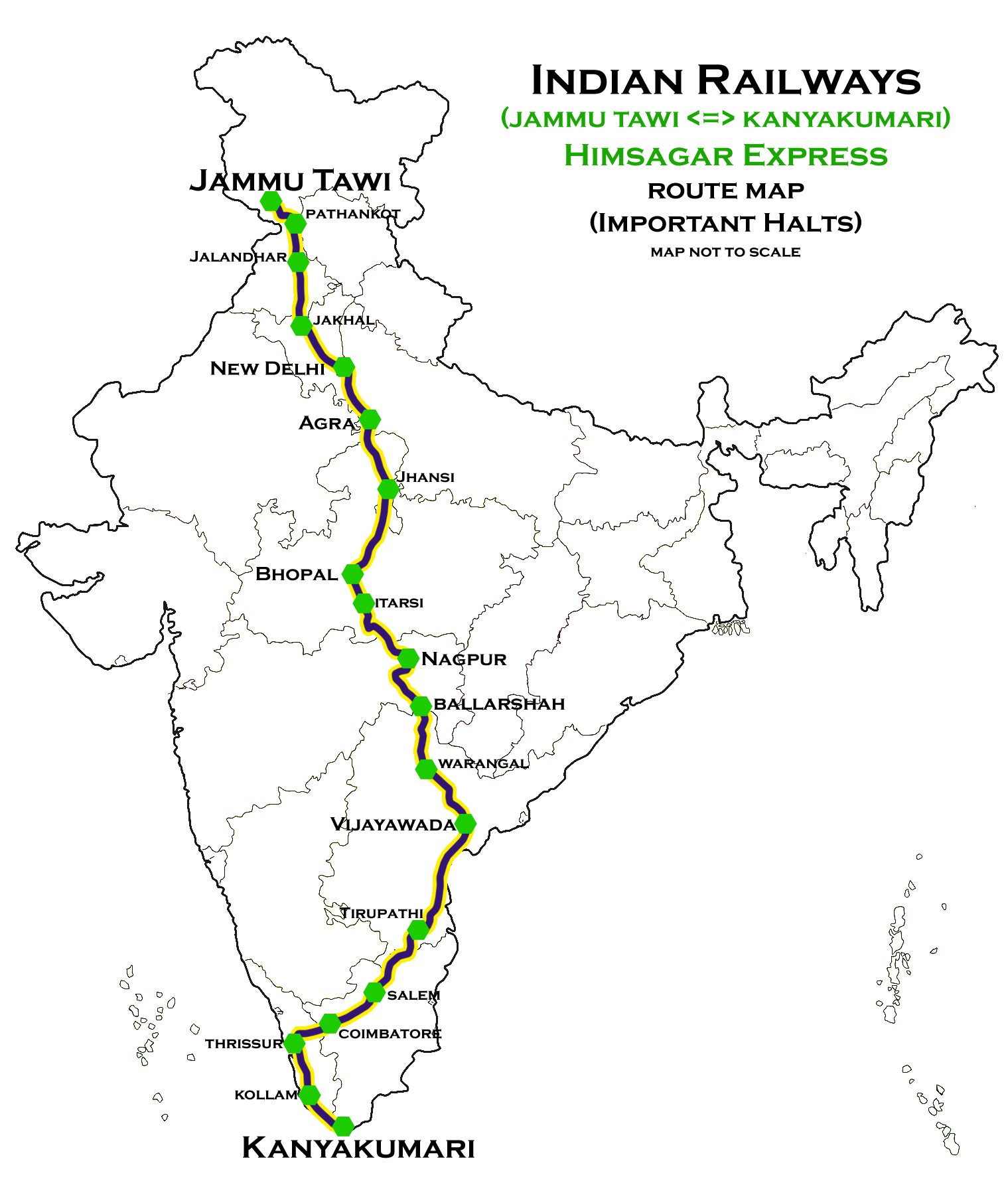

The 16317 / 16318 Himsagar Express is a weekly Express train of the Indian Railways running between India's southern most operational railway station of Kanyakumari to India's Northern Most Operational and connected railway station(as of March 2024) of Shri Mata Vaishno Devi Katra in Jammu and Kashmir. It is currently the 35th longest-distance train service of world and third-longest-distance train on the Indian Railways in terms of distance and time, surpassed by the 22503/04 Dibrugarh-Kanyakumari Vivek Express and 12507/08 Aronai Superfast Express . In 73 hours, the train covers a distance of 3790 km at a speed of 52 km/h, and transverses twelve of India's states halting at a total of 73 stations.

== History ==
Krishnagiri MP Dr. P. V. Periasamy's demand promoted national integration from Kanyakumari to Kashmir through direct train service on 19-03-1979 in parliament. The proposals to extend 131/132 Jayanti Janata Express to and from Thiruvananthapuram and 125/126 Karnataka Kerala Express to and from Kanyakumari and Jammu Tawi have been earlier examined at length and not found feasible. However, possibility of extending 131/132 Jayanti Janata Express to and from Kanyakumari in the South and to Jammu Tawi in the North on once-a-week basis is under examination; and if found feasible would provide a direct train between Jammu Tawi and Kanyakumari interalia serving Thiruvananthapuram with Delhi by this service.

== Route ==
16317/18 Himsagar Express runs via following stations and states with stoppages listed in bold:

TAMIL NADU

1. **Kanniyakumari** (Starts)
2. Nagercoil
3. Kulitturai
4. **Coimbatore Junction**
5. Tiruppur
6. Erode Junction
7. Salem Junction
8. Jolarpettai Junction
9. Katpadi Junction

KERALA

1. **Thiruvananthapuram Central**
2. Kollam Junction
3. Kayamkulam
4. Chengannur
5. Tiruvalla
6. Kottayam
7. **Ernakulam Town**
8. Aluva
9. Thrissur
10. Ottappalam
11. Palakkad Junction

ANDHRA PRADESH

1. Chittoor
2. **Tirupati**
3. **Renigunta Junction**
4. Gudur Junction
5. Nellore
6. Ongole
7. Tenali
8. **Vijayawada Junction**

TELANGANA

1. **Khammam**
2. **Warangal**
3. Ramagundam

MAHARASHTRA

1. **Balharshah Junction**
2. Chandrapur
3. **Sewagram Junction**
4. **Nagpur Junction**

MADHYA PRADESH

1. **Itarsi Junction**
2. **Bhopal Junction**
3. **Gwalior Junction**

RAJASTHAN

1. Dholpur

UTTAR PRADESH

1. Jhansi Junction
2. **Agra Cantonment**

HARYANA

1. Bahadurgarh
2. Faridabad
3. **Rohtak Junction**
4. Jind Junction
5. Narwana
6. Tohana
7. Jakhal Junction

DELHI

1. **Hazrat Nizamuddin**
2. **New Delhi**
3. Shakurbasti

PUNJAB

1. Lehragaga
2. Sunam
3. Sangrur
4. Dhuri Junction
5. Malerkotla
6. Ahmedgarh
7. Kila Raipur
8. **Ludhiana Junction**
9. Phillaur Junction
10. Phagwara Junction
11. **Jalandhar Cantonment**
12. Urmar Tanda
13. Dasuya
14. Mukerian
15. **Pathankot Cantonment**

JAMMU KASHMIR

1. Kathua
2. Samba
3. **Jammu Tawi**
4. Udhampur
5. **Shri Mata Vaishno Devi Katra** (Ends)

== Traction ==
Both trains are hauled by an Erode Loco Shed or Royapuram Loco Shed based WAP-7 electric locomotive from CAPE to SVDK.

== Coach composition ==
The train has 20 LHB coaches comprising two Second AC (2AC), Six Third AC (3AC), six Sleeper class (SL), two Unreserved coaches (UR/GS), two Luggage rakes (SLR) and one Pantry car (PC). (Note: The coach composition is subject to change.)

Loco	1	2	3	4	5	6	7	8	9	10	11	12	13	14	15	16	17	18	19	20
	EOG	UR	A1	A2	B6	B5	B4	B3	B2	B1	M1	PC	S6	S5	S4	S3	S2	S1	UR	GSLRD

== See also ==
- Vivek Express
- Navyug Express
- Longest train services
- Longest train services of Indian Railways
