= Longest train services of Indian Railways =

This article lists the longest passenger rail services that are currently scheduled and running directly between two cities. Services that require railcar exchanges, coach changes, shunting or station transfers are not listed.

== Longest train services, by distance ==
No.	Origin station	Destination station	Train name/No.	Distance	No. of stops	Frequency	Scheduled running time	Ref
1	Dibrugarh	Kanniyakumari	22503/22504 Dibrugarh–Kanyakumari Vivek Superfast Express	4,154.1 km	58	Daily	75 hrs 30 min (~3 days 3 hours 30 minutes)	
2	Silchar	Thiruvananthapuram Central	15607/15608 Thiruvananthapuram–Silchar Aronai Express	3,915.5 km	57	Weekly	71 hours 45 min (~2 days 23 hours 45 minutes)	
3	Kanniyakumari	Shri Mata Vaishno Devi Katra	16317/16318 Himsagar Express	3,788.7 km	65	Weekly	68 hrs 20 min (~2 days 20 hours 20 minutes)	
4	Tirunelveli Junction	Shri Mata Vaishno Devi Katra	16787/16788 Tiruneveli—Jammu Express	3,642 km	64	Weekly	71 hrs 20 min (~2 days 23 hours 20 minutes)	
5	Firozpur Cantonment Junction	Rameswaram	20497/20498 Firozpur Cantt.-Rameswaram Humsafar Express	3,544 km	41	Weekly	60 hrs 30 min (~2 days 12 hours 30 minutes)	
6	New Tinsukia	Sir M. Visvesvaraya Terminal	22501/22502 New Tinsukia–SMVT Bengaluru Weekly Superfast Express	3,542 km	38	Weekly	63 hrs 15 mins (~2 days 15 hours 15 minutes)	
7	Agartala	Sir M. Visvesvaraya Terminal	12503/12504 Agartala–SMVT Bengaluru Humsafar Express	3,529 km	31	2 times weekly	64 hrs 15 mins (~2 days 16 hours 15 minutes)	
8	Silchar	Coimbatore Main	12515/12516 Silchar–Coimbatore Express	3,492.5 km	38	Weekly	55 hrs 13 mins (~2 days 7 hours 13 minutes)	
9	Barauni Junction	Ernakulam Junction	12521/12522 Ernakulam junction Rapti sagar express	3,434 km	60	weekly	60 hrs 40 min (~3 days 11 hours 30 minutes)	
10	Thiruvananthapuram North	Chandigarh Junction	12217/12218 Smpark Kranthi Express	3,411 km	25	2 times weekly	48 hrs 40 min (~3 days 11 hours 30 minutes)	

== Longest non-stop train services (limited stops), by distance and time ==
This section lists the longest passenger rail services that are currently scheduled and running directly between two consecutive railway stations.

No	Non-stop section	Train name/no	Distance	Frequency	Running time	Ref
1	Prayagraj – New Delhi	12275/12276 Prayagraj–New Delhi Humsafar Express[though it have an technical halt at Tundla Jn.]	632 km	S, T, T, F	7 hrs 45 min	
2	Mumbai Central - Ahmedabad Junction	Mumbai Central-Hapa Duronto Express	493 km	Daily	5 hrs 55 min	
3	New Delhi – Kota Junction	Mumbai Rajdhani Express	465 km	Daily	4 hrs 35 min	
3	New Delhi – Kota Junction	Mumbai–New Delhi Duronto Express	465 km	Bi-Weekly	5 hrs 35 min	
4	Hazrat Nizamuddin - Kota Junction	Hazrat Nizamuddin–Pune Duronto Express	458 km	Bi-Weekly	4 hrs 24 min	
4	Hazrat Nizamuddin - Kota Junction	Pune–Hazrat Nizamuddin AC Superfast Express	458 km	Weekly	4 hrs 40 min	
4	Hazrat Nizamuddin - Kota Junction	Hazrat Nizamuddin–Thiruvananthapuram Rajdhani Express	458 km	Tri-Weekly	4 hrs 24 min	
4	Hazrat Nizamuddin - Kota Junction	Kerala Sampark Kranti Express	458 km	Bi-Weekly	4 hrs 42 min	
4	Hazrat Nizamuddin - Kota Junction	Kochuveli–Amritsar Weekly Express	458 km	Weekly	4 hrs 45 min	
4	Hazrat Nizamuddin - Kota Junction	Kochuveli–Yog Nagari Rishikesh Superfast Express	458 km	Weekly	4 hrs 42 min	
4	Hazrat Nizamuddin - Kota Junction	Ernakulam–H.Nizamuddin Duronto Express	458 km	Weekly	4 hrs 40 min	
4	Hazrat Nizamuddin - Kota Junction	Maharashtra Sampark Kranti Express	458 km	Bi-Weekly	4 hrs 45 min	
4	Hazrat Nizamuddin - Kota Junction	Madgaon–Hazrat Nizamuddin Rajdhani Express	458 km	Bi-Weekly	4 hrs 24 min	
5	Balharshah Junction – Vijayawada Junction	Thirukural Express	451 km	Weekly	6 hrs 55 min	
5	Balharshah Junction – Vijayawada Junction	Chennai–Hazrat Nizamuddin Duronto Express	451 km	Weekly	5 hrs 35 min	
5	Balharshah Junction – Vijayawada Junction	Tamil Nadu Sampark Kranti Express	451 km	Weekly	6 hrs 50 min	
6	New Delhi – Kanpur Central	New Delhi Varanasi Vande Bharat Express	440 km	Bi-weekly	4 hrs 08 min	
6	New Delhi – Kanpur Central	12301/12302 Howrah Rajdhani Express	440 km	Bi-weekly	4 hrs 37 min	
6	New Delhi – Kanpur Central	12305/12306 Howrah Rajdhani Express	440 km	Bi-weekly	4 hrs 37 min	
6	New Delhi – Kanpur Central	22811/22812 Bhubaneswar Rajdhani Express	440 km	Daily	4 hrs 37 min	
6	New Delhi – Kanpur Central	22823/22825 Bhubaneswar Rajdhani Express	440 km	Daily	4 hrs 37 min	
6	New Delhi – Kanpur Central	20817/20818 Bhubaneswar Rajdhani Express	440 km	Daily	4 hrs 37 min	
6	New Delhi – Kanpur Central	Rajendra Nagar Patna Rajdhani Express	440 km	Daily	4 hrs 42 min	
6	New Delhi – Kanpur Central	Sealdah Rajdhani Express	440 km	Daily	4 hrs 42 min	
6	New Delhi – Kanpur Central	Sealdah-Bikaner Duronto Express	440 km	Weekly	4 hrs 50 min	
6	New Delhi – Kanpur Central	20839/20840 Ranchi Rajdhani Express	440 km	Daily	4 hrs 42 min	
6	New Delhi – Kanpur Central	12453/12454 Ranchi Rajdhani Express	440 km	Daily	4 hrs 42 min	
6	New Delhi – Kanpur Central	Ranchi–New Delhi Garib Rath Express	440 km	Weekly	4 hrs 42 min	
6	New Delhi – Kanpur Central	Dibrugarh Rajdhani Express	440 km	Weekly	4 hrs 42 min	
6	New Delhi – Kanpur Central	Howrah–New Delhi Duronto Express	440 km	Bi-weekly	4 hrs 55 min	
6	New Delhi – Kanpur Central	Bhubaneswar–New Delhi Duronto Express	440 km	Weekly	4 hrs 55 min	
6	New Delhi – Kanpur Central	Sampoorna Kranti Express	440 km	Daily	4 hrs 52 min	
6	New Delhi – Kanpur Central	Purushottam Express	440 km	Daily	5 hrs 20 min	
6	New Delhi – Kanpur Central	Bihar Sampark Kranti Superfast Express	440 km	Daily	5 hrs 10 min	
6	New Delhi – Kanpur Central	Shiv Ganga Express	440 km	Daily	4 hrs 55 min	
6	New Delhi – Kanpur Central	Gorakhdham Express	440 km	Daily	5 hrs 30 min	
6	New Delhi – Kanpur Central	Godda Humsafar Express	440 km	Weekly	5 hrs 35 min	
6	New Delhi – Kanpur Central	02569/Darbhanga - New Delhi Special Fare Clone	440 km	Daily	5 hrs 40 min	
6	New Delhi – Kanpur Central	Varanasi–New Delhi Vande Bharat Express	440 km	6 DAYS	4 hrs 08 min	
6	New Delhi – Kanpur Central	NDLS BARAUNI SPL FARE 02564	440 km	DAILY	5 hrs 55 min	
7	Howrah Junction - Bhubaneswar	Howrah–SMVT Bengaluru Duronto Express	436 km	Except Monday & Thursday	5 hrs 30 min	
8	Chilahati – Dhaka Cantonment	13131 Mitali Express	432 km	Daily	8 hrs 5 min	
9	Chennai Central – Vijayawada Junction	Chennai Rajdhani Express	431 km	Daily	5 hrs 45 min	
9	Chennai Central – Vijayawada Junction	Tamil Nadu Express	431 km	Bi-weekly	6 hrs 10 min	
9	Chennai Central – Vijayawada Junction	06510 Sanghamitra Clone Humsafar Special	431 km	Weekly	7 hrs 45 min	
10	Vijayawada Junction – Perambur	12510 Kaziranga Superfast Express	430 km	Daily	6 hrs 55 min	
10	Vijayawada Junction – Perambur	Yesvantpur–Muzaffarpur Weekly Express	430 km	Bi-weekly	7 hrs 40 min	
10	Vijayawada Junction – Perambur	Silchar–Coimbatore Superfast Express	430 km	Weekly	6 hrs 45 min	
10	Vijayawada Junction – Perambur	Thiruvananthapuram–Silchar Aronai Superfast Express	430 km	Weekly	6 hrs 40 mns	
11	Panki – New Delhi	Shram Shakti Express	429 km	Daily	6 hrs 28 min	
12	Anand Vihar Terminal – Kanpur Central	22539/22540 Mau - Anand Vihar Super Fast Express	428 km	Bi-weekly	5 hrs 20 min	
12	Anand Vihar Terminal – Kanpur Central	Vikramshila Express	428 km	Bi-weekly	6 hrs 15 min	
12	Anand Vihar Terminal – Kanpur Central	12323/12324 Howrah–Anand Vihar Superfast Express	428 km	Bi-weekly	6 hrs 40 min	
12	Anand Vihar Terminal – Kanpur Central	Odisha Sampark Kranti Express	428 km	Weekly	6 hrs 55 min	
12	Anand Vihar Terminal – Kanpur Central	Jharkhand Sampark Kranti Express	428 km	Daily	6 hrs 10 min	
12	Anand Vihar Terminal – Kanpur Central	Bhubaneswar–Anand Vihar Weekly Superfast Express	428 km	Weekly	6 hrs 10 min	
12	Anand Vihar Terminal – Kanpur Central	West Bengal Sampark Kranti Express	428 km	Bi-weekly	7 hrs 50 min	

== See also ==
- Longest train services
- List of countries by rail transport network size
