= Jivachh Link Express =

Train in the Northeast Frontier Railway zone, India

Overview
- Service type: Express
- Current operator: Northeast Frontier Railway zone

Route
- Termini: Darbhanga Junction (DBG); New Tinsukia Junction (NTSK)
- Stops: 43
- Distance travelled: 1,434 km (891 mi)
- Average journey time: 33h 55m
- Service frequency: Daily (Note: Runs seven days in a week for every direction.)
- Train number: 25909/25910

On-board services
- Classes: AC 3 tier, Sleeper class
- Seating arrangements: No
- Sleeping arrangements: Yes
- Catering facilities: On-board catering E-catering
- Observation facilities: ICF coach
- Entertainment facilities: No
- Baggage facilities: No
- Other facilities: Below the seats

Technical
- Rolling stock: 2
- Track gauge: 1,676 mm (5 ft 6 in)
- Operating speed: 42 km/h (26 mph), including halts

The Jivacch Link Express is an Express train belonging to Northeast Frontier Railway zone that runs between Darbhanga Junction and New Tinsukia junction in India. It was being operated with 25909/25910 train numbers on daily basis, but now cancelled.

== Service ==
The 25909/Jivacch Link Express has an average speed of 42 km/h and covers 1434 km in 33h 55m. The 25910/Jivachh Link Express has an average speed of 41 km/h and covers 1434 km in 33h 50m.

== Route and halts ==
The important halts of the train are:

- Dibrugarh
- New Tinsukia Junction
- Mariani Junction
- Dimapur
- Diphu
- Lumding Junction
- Chaparmukh Junction
- Jagiroad
- Guwahati
- Kamakhya Junction
- Rangiya Junction
- New Bongaigaon Junction
- New Alipurduar
- New Cooch Behar
- Dhupguri
- New Jalpaiguri (Siliguri)
- Barsoi Junction
- Katihar Junction
- Barauni Junction
- Samastipur Junction
- Darbhanga Junction

== Coach composition ==
The train has standard ICF rakes with a maximum speed of 110 kmph. The train consists of 7 coaches:

- 1 AC III Tier coach
- 1 Sleeper coach

== Traction ==
Both trains are hauled by a Siliguri Loco Shed-based WDP-4D diesel locomotive from Dibrugarh to Katihar. From Katihar the train is hauled by a Ghaziabad Loco Shed-based WAP-4 electric locomotive as far as Samastipur. From Samastipur the train is hauled by a Samastipur Loco Shed-based WDM-3A diesel locomotive to Darbhanga and vice versa.

== See also ==
- Dibrugarh railway station
- Darbhanga Junction railway station
- Kamla Ganga Intercity Fast Passenger
- Avadh Assam Express
