= New Bongaigaon Junction railway station =

Railway station in Assam, India

NEW BONGAIGAON JUNCTION

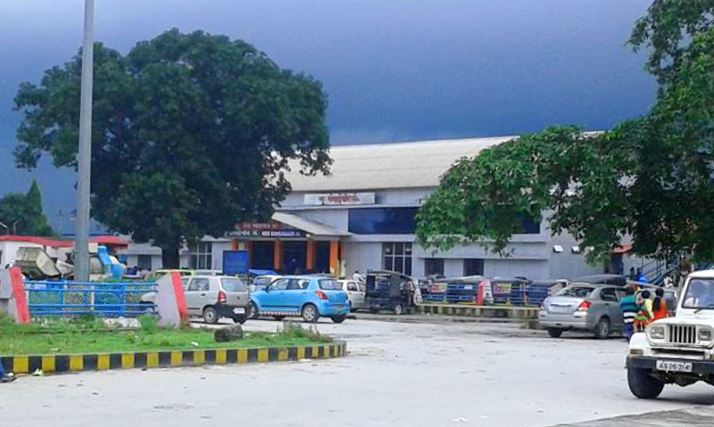

General information
- Location: Dangtol Road, New Bongaigaon Railway Colony, New Bongaigaon-783381, Assam; India
- Coordinates: 26°28′33″N 90°33′47″E
- Elevation: 58 metres (190 ft)
- System: Regional Rail & Commuter Rail Station
- Owner: Indian Railways
- Operator: Northeast Frontier Railway
- Lines: Barauni-Guwahati line; New Jalpaiguri–New Bongaigaon section; New Bongaigaon–Guwahati section; New Bongaigaon–Jogihopa–Kamakhya line
- Platforms: 7 (1, 1A, 1B, 2, 3, 4, 5)
- Tracks: 12
- Connections: Auto-rickshaw Stand, Taxi Stand

Construction
- Structure type: At grade
- Parking: Available
- Cycle facilities: Available
- Accessible: Yes

Other information
- Status: Functioning
- Station code: NBQ
- Zone(s): Northeast Frontier
- Division(s): Rangiya

History
- Opened: 1965
- Electrified: Yes
- Former names: Assam Bengal Railway

Passengers
- 50K/Day (▲ high)

Services
Location
- Location within India Location within Assam Location within India
- Interactive map of New Bongaigaon Junction

New Bongaigaon Junction is an important railway junction station of Barauni–Guwahati line and New Bongaigaon–Jogihopa–Kamakhya line of Northeast Frontier Railway. It serves as the prime railway station for Bongaigaon District. It is the largest railway station with Carriage & Wagon Workshop in Rangiya railway division. It is also recognized as the second largest railway station in Assam as well as in the entire Northeast region after Guwahati. Around 150 trains halt in this station and 6 trains originate and terminate at this station. All the trains travelling through the route makes a scheduled halt at this prominent junction with the sole exception Agartala-Anand Vihar Terminal Tejas Rajdhani Express which passes through without an intermediate station and Sairang-Kolkata Express is the only train that by-passes the junction through the Abhayapuri-Dhubri Route. Although some trains do not halt at nearby towns such Barpeta Road, Bijni, Sorbhog, Kokrajhar and Goalpara, but they remain accessible from New Bongaigaon Junction through extensive transport options including taxis, buses, auto rickshaws, e-rickshaws and 24/7 Rapido Services which eases commutabilty. Hence, this major junction is also widely used by the people of adjacent towns for their commutation.

== History ==
Construction of the 265 km (165 mi)-long 5 ft 6 in (1,676 mm) broad gauge Siliguri–Jogihopa line, between 1963 and 1965, brought broad-gauge railways to Assam. It also was the reason for setting up the New Bongaigaon railway station.

A new railway track from New Bongaigaon to Guwahati was commissioned in 1984.

Saraighat Bridge opened in 1962, initially carrying a metre-gauge track, which was later replaced by broad gauge.

== Electrification ==
Electrification of the Barauni–Katihar–Guwahati line was sanctioned in 2008. In the document on Vision 2020 – A Blue Print for Railway Electrification Programme, in the list of ongoing projects the entire route km (836) is shown as balance work as on 1 April 2010. The entire electrification project is scheduled to be completed by 2022. As on 2026, The electrification project is completed in this station.

== Track doubling ==
Doubling of the track between New Bongaigaon and Kamakhya via Rangia was approved in the Railway Budget for 2013–14. A double-line track is there between Samuktala Road and New Bongaigaon. Now, the double-line track has been extended to Guwahati both via the Rangiya Junction and Goalpara Town routes and is operational.

== Amenities ==
New Bongaigaon Junction has two double-bedded retiring rooms, computerized railway reservation system, AC and Non-AC waiting rooms and vegetarian and non vegetarian food stalls. It also has Elevator and Free-WiFi facilities. The railway station has extensive transport options including taxis, buses, auto rickshaws, e-rickshaws and 24/7 Rapido Services which eases commutabilty. Hence, this major junction is also widely used by the people of adjacent towns for their commutation. The station is currently undergoing upgradation and is expected to serve the passengers with better facilities in the near future, post upgradation.

== Workshop ==
The Carriage and Wagon Workshop is located about 2 km west of New Bongaigaon railway station. It was set up in sixties and has maintenance, as well as manufacturing facilities.

== Gallery ==
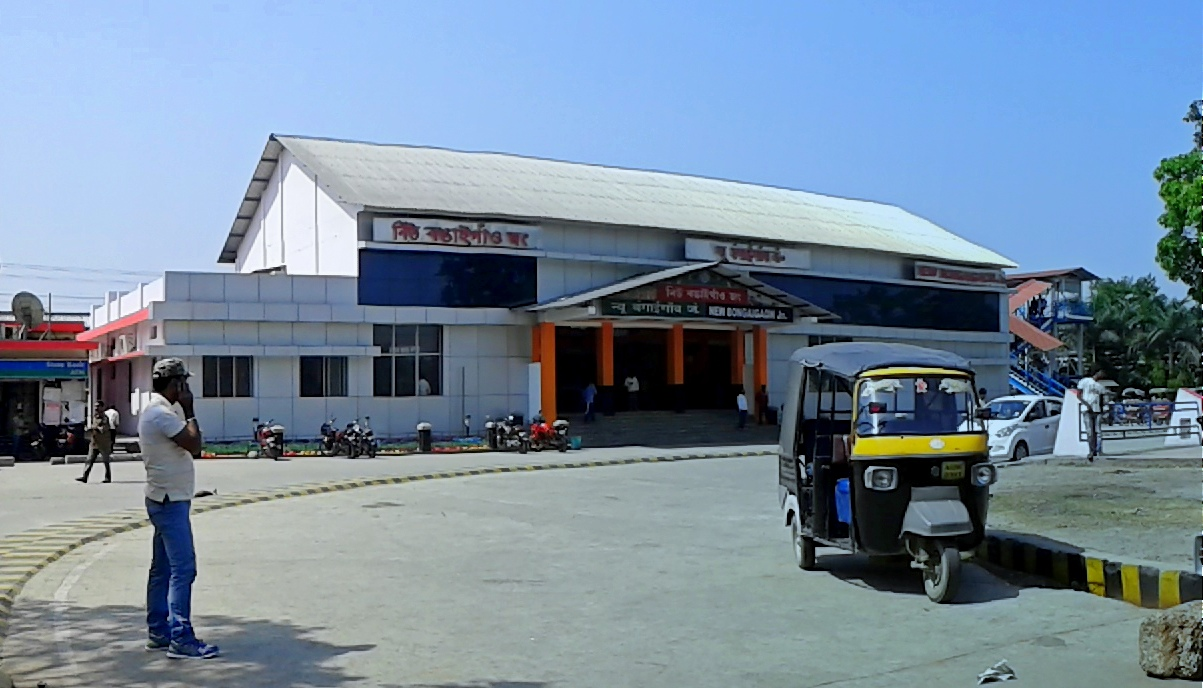
Front of the station from another side

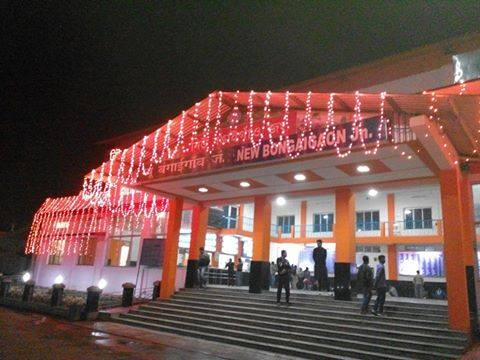
New Bongaigaon Junction station night view with decorated light

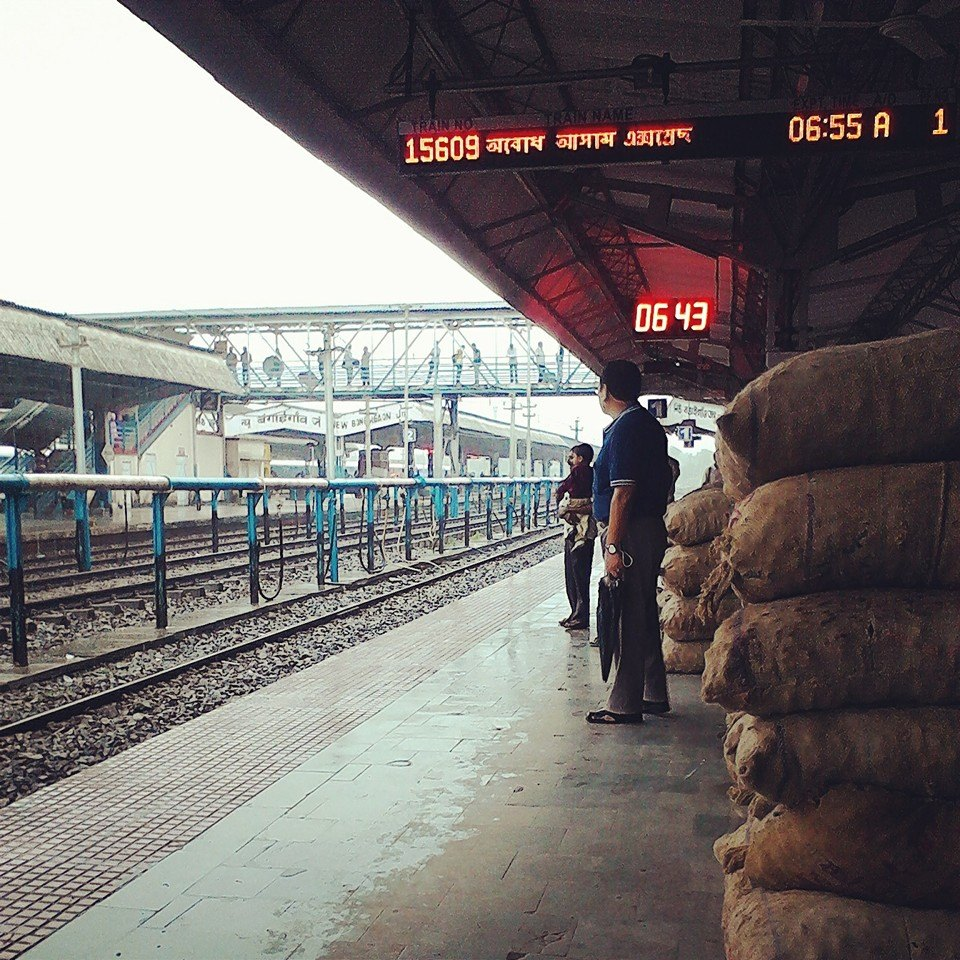
Platform No. 3/2 of New Bongaigaon Junction Station

== List of trains halting ==
1. Kamakhya – Howrah Vande Bharat Sleeper Express
2. Guwahati - New Jalpaiguri Vande Bharat Express
3. Dibrugarh - New Delhi Rajdhani Express (Via New Tinsukia)
4. Dibrugarh - New Delhi Rajdhani Express (Via Moranhat)
5. Dibrugarh - New Delhi Rajdhani Express (Via Rangapara North)
6. Sairang – Anand Vihar Terminal Rajdhani Express (Via Malda Town)
7. Agartala - Sir M. Visvesvaraya Terminal Bengaluru Humsafar Express
8. Naharlagun - Anand Vihar Terminal Arunachal AC Superfast Express
9. Agartala - Lokmanya Tilak Terminus AC Express
10. Kamakhya - Sir M. Visvesvaraya Terminal Bengaluru AC Superfast Express
11. Dibrugarh - Gomti Nagar Amrit Bharat Express
12. Guwahati - New Delhi Poorvottar Sampark Kranti Superfast Express
13. Silchar–New Delhi Poorvottar Sampark Kranti Superfast Express
14. Silchar - Thiruvananthapuram Aronai Express
15. Silchar - Coimbatore Express
16. Silchar - Sealdah Kanchanjunga Express
17. Dibrugarh–Kanyakumari Vivek Superfast Express
18. New Tinsukia–Tambaram Express
19. New Tinsukia–Amritsar Express
20. Dibrugarh - Kolkata Special Express
21. Dibrugarh–Chandigarh Express
22. Dibrugarh - Lokmanya Tilak Terminus Express
23. Dibrugarh-Lalgarh Avadh Assam Express
24. Dibrugarh–Kolkata Superfast Express
25. Dibrugarh-Howrah Kamrup Express (via Guwahati)
26. Dibrugarh–Howrah Kamrup Express (Via Rangapara North)
27. Silghat Town - Tambaram Nagaon Express
28. Silghat Town - Kolkata Kaziranga Express
29. Agartala - Firozpur Tripura Sundari Express
30. Agartala - Deoghar Weekly Express
31. Sabroom - Sealdah Kanchanjunga Express
32. New Tinsukia–SMVT Bengaluru Superfast Express
33. Dibrugarh–Rajendra Nagar Weekly Express
34. Guwahati - Jammu Tawi Lohit Express
35. Guwahati- Sir M. Visvesvaraya Terminal Bengaluru Superfast Express
36. Guwahati - Bikaner Express
37. Guwahati - Okha Dwarka Express
38. Guwahati - Barmer Express
39. Silchar – Charlapalli Express
40. Guwahati-Jammu Tawi Amarnath Express
41. Guwahati - Lokmanya Tilak Terminus Express
42. Guwahati-Howrah Saraighat Superfast Express
43. Guwahati - Kolkata Garib Rath Express
44. Kamakhya–Shri Mata Vaishno Devi Katra Express
45. Kamakhya–Gandhidham Express
46. Kamakhya - Lokmanya Tilak Terminus Karmabhoomi Superfast Express.
47. Kamakhya–Rohtak Amrit Bharat Express
48. Kamakhya - Charlapalli Amrit Bharat Express
49. Kamakhya - Udaipur City Kavi Guru Express
50. Kamakhya - Jodhpur, Bhagat Ki Kothi Express
51. Kamakhya - Delhi Brahmaputra Mail
52. Kamakhya - Dr. Ambedkar Nagar Express
53. Kamakhya - Ranchi Express
54. Kamakhya - Puri Express (via Howrah Jn.)
55. Kamakhya - Puri Express (via Asansol Jn.)
56. Kamakhya–Gaya Express
57. Kamakhya–Anand Vihar Express
58. Kamakhya - Anand Vihar Terminal Northeast Superfast Express
59. Kamakhya - Gomti Nagar Express
60. Kamakhya - Rajendra Nagar Terminal Capital Express
61. Kamakhya - Alipurduar Intercity Express
62. New Jalpaiguri - Guwahati Intercity Express
63. New Jalpaiguri - Bongaigaon Intercity Express
64. Alipurduar–Silghat Town Rajya Rani Express
65. Alipurduar Jn. - Mariani Intercity Express
66. Naharlagun - Hapa Weekly Express
67. Naharlagun - Secundrabad AC Special Express
68. Naharlagun - Santragachi Special Express
69. Guwahati - Kanpur Central Special Express
70. Agartala - Rani Kamalapati Weekly Express
71. Agartala - Charlapalli Express
72. Agartala - Kolkata Garib Rath Express

== See also ==
- North Eastern Railway Connectivity Project
- North Western Railway zone

Preceding station	Indian Railways	Following station
Dangtal towards ?	Northeast Frontier Railway zone New Jalpaiguri–New Bongaigaon section and New Bongaigaon–Guwahati section	Bongaigaon towards ?
Terminus	Northeast Frontier Railway zone Bongaigaon–Jogihopa–Kamakhya Jn. line	Majgaon towards ?
