= Silchar–Coimbatore Superfast Express =

Express train of the Indian Railways

Silchar-Coimbatore Express

Overview
- Service type: Mail/Express
- First service: 30 January 1984; 42 years ago
- Current operator: Northeast Frontier Railway

Route
- Termini: Silchar (SCL); Coimbatore Junction (CBE)
- Stops: 43
- Distance travelled: 3,492 km (2,170 mi)
- Average journey time: 63 hours 50 mins
- Service frequency: Weekly
- Train number: 15627/15628

On-board services
- Classes: AC 2 Tier, AC 3 Tier, Sleeper 3 Tier, Unreserved
- Seating arrangements: Yes
- Sleeping arrangements: Yes
- Catering facilities: Yes
- Observation facilities: LHB coach
- Entertainment facilities: No
- Baggage facilities: Available

Technical
- Rolling stock: 2
- Track gauge: 1,676 mm (5 ft 6 in)
- Operating speed: 54 km/h (34 mph)

The Silchar-Coimbatore Express is an Express train of the Indian Railways belonging to Northeast Frontier Railway connecting Silchar in Assam and Coimbatore Junction in Tamil Nadu. It is currently being operated with 15627/15628 train numbers on once in week basis. The train passes through Assam, West Bengal, Bihar, Jharkhand, Odisha, Andhra Pradesh and Tamil Nadu. It starts from Silchar at 20:10 on Tuesday and reaches Coimbatore Junction at 12:00 on Friday. During its journey the train travels through major cities like Guwahati, Siliguri, Malda, Rampurhat, Kolkata, Kharagpur, Cuttack, Bhubaneswar, Vizianagaram, Visakhapatnam, Rajahmundry, Vijayawada, Chennai, Vellore, Salem, Erode and Coimbatore. It holds the record of 8th longest running train of Indian Railways that covers 3492 km. (as of 2022).

== Routing ==
The 15627/28 Silchar–Coimbatore Superfast Express runs through the following states and railway stations:

ASSAM

1. Silchar (Starts)
2. Badarpur Junction
3. New Haflong
4. Lumding Junction
5. Hojai
6. Guwahati
7. Kamakhya Junction
8. Rangiya Junction
9. Barpeta Road
10. New Bongaigaon Junction
11. Kokrajhar

BIHAR

1. Kishanganj

WEST BENGAL

1. New Alipurduar
2. New Cooch Behar
3. Dhupguri
4. New Jalpaiguri (Siliguri)
5. Malda Town
6. New Farakka Junction
7. Rampurhat Junction
8. Bolpur Shantiniketan
9. Dankuni (Kolkata)
10. Kharagpur Junction

ODISHA

1. Balasore
2. Bhadrak
3. Jajpur Keonjhar
4. Cuttack Junction
5. Bhubaneswar
6. Khurda Road Junction
7. Balugaon
8. Brahmapur

ANDHRA PRADESH

1. Palasa
2. Srikakulam
3. Vizianagaram Junction
4. Visakhapatnam Junction
5. Rajahmundry
6. Vijayawada Junction

TAMIL NADU

1. Perambur (Chennai)
2. Arakkonam Junction
3. Katpadi Junction
4. Jolarpettai Junction
5. Salem Junction
6. Erode Junction
7. Tirupur
8. Coimbatore Junction(Ends)

Note:

- Bold letters indicate Major Railway Stations/Major Cities.
- The train also passes through Sahibganj district and Pakur district of Jharkhand, but it does not have any stoppages there.

== Reversal ==
The train reverses the direction in the following stations

- Badarpur Junction
- Lumding Junction
- Visakhapatnam Junction

== Locomotive ==
Silchar - Coimbatore Express is hauled by WDP-4 from Silchar to Lumding. WAP-4 Locomotive of Electric Loco Shed, Howrah from Lumding to Visakhapatnam. From Visakhapatnam to Coimbatore Junction the train is hauled by WAP-4 Locomotive of Electric Loco Shed, Arakkonam/ Electric Loco Shed, Erode and vice versa.

== Coach composition ==
Silchar Coimbatore Express consists of One Second AC (2AC) coaches, Four Third AC (3AC) coaches, Thirteen Sleeper (SL) coaches, Two Second Sitting(2S) coaches Engine and One End On Generator (EOG) coach.

== Rake sharing ==
The train shares its rake with Silchar - Thiruvananthapuram Aronai Superfast Express and Silchar - New Tinsukia Barak Brahmaputra Express.

== Gallery ==
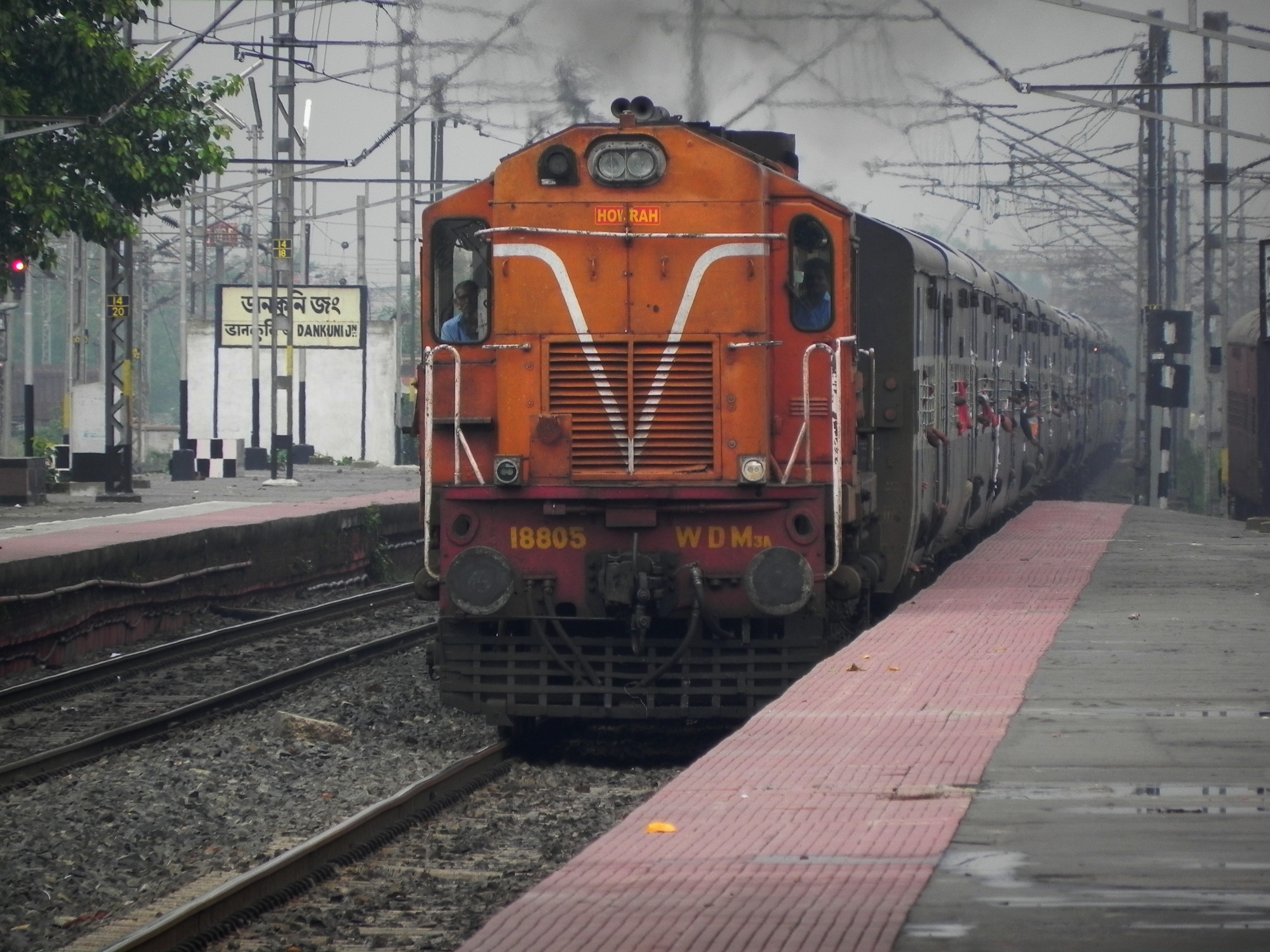
Silchar-bound 12515 (SCL–CBE) Weekly Express spotted at Dankuni, West Bengal
