= Barak–Brahmaputra Express =

Train in India

Barak Brahmaputra Express

Overview
- Service type: Express
- Locale: Assam
- First service: 8 April 2018; 8 years ago
- Current operator: Northeast Frontier Railway

Route
- Termini: Silchar (SCL); New Tinsukia (NTSK)
- Stops: 9
- Distance travelled: 566 km (352 mi)
- Average journey time: 14 hours 30 minutes
- Service frequency: Weekly
- Train number: 15641 / 15642

On-board services
- Classes: AC 2 Tier, AC 3 Tier, Sleeper Class, General Unreserved
- Seating arrangements: Yes
- Sleeping arrangements: Yes
- Catering facilities: On-board catering, E-catering
- Observation facilities: Large windows
- Baggage facilities: No
- Other facilities: Below the seats

Technical
- Rolling stock: LHB coach
- Track gauge: 1,676 mm (5 ft 6 in)
- Operating speed: 100 km/h (62 mph) maximum, 39 km/h (24 mph) average including halts.

The 15641 / 15642 Barak Brahmaputra Express is a weekly Express train, which runs between the Silchar and New Tinsukia stations in Assam, India. It comes under the Northeast Frontier Railway zone. This train is named after Indian rivers Brahmaputra and Barak, both of which are two main rivers of Assam and also they are important for connectivity in Barak & Brahmaputra Valley.

== Overview ==
This train was inaugurated on 8 April 2018. It was flagged off by Sarbananda Sonowal (former Chief Minister of Assam) and Rajen Gohain (former Minister of state of Railways), from Dibrugarh with a weekly frequency train service and it was run as Silchar–Dibrugarh Express. After 2 months in June 2018 this train name was given as Barak Brahmaputra Express.

== Routes ==
This train passes through every Major station including Badarpur Junction, New Haflong, Lumding Junction, Dimapur & Mariani Junction on both sides. Sometime for passes train has to stop at some small halt too, which sometime increase the journey time.

== Traction ==
As the route is partially electrified, a Siliguri Loco Shed based WDP-4 / WDP-4B / WDP-4D diesel locomotives pulls the train in both directions.

== Rake sharing ==
The train shares its rake with 12507 Aronai Express and 12515/16 Coimbatore–Silchar Express.
