= Silchar–New Delhi Poorvottar Sampark Kranti Express =

Train in India

Silchar - New Delhi Poorvottar Sampark Kranti Express
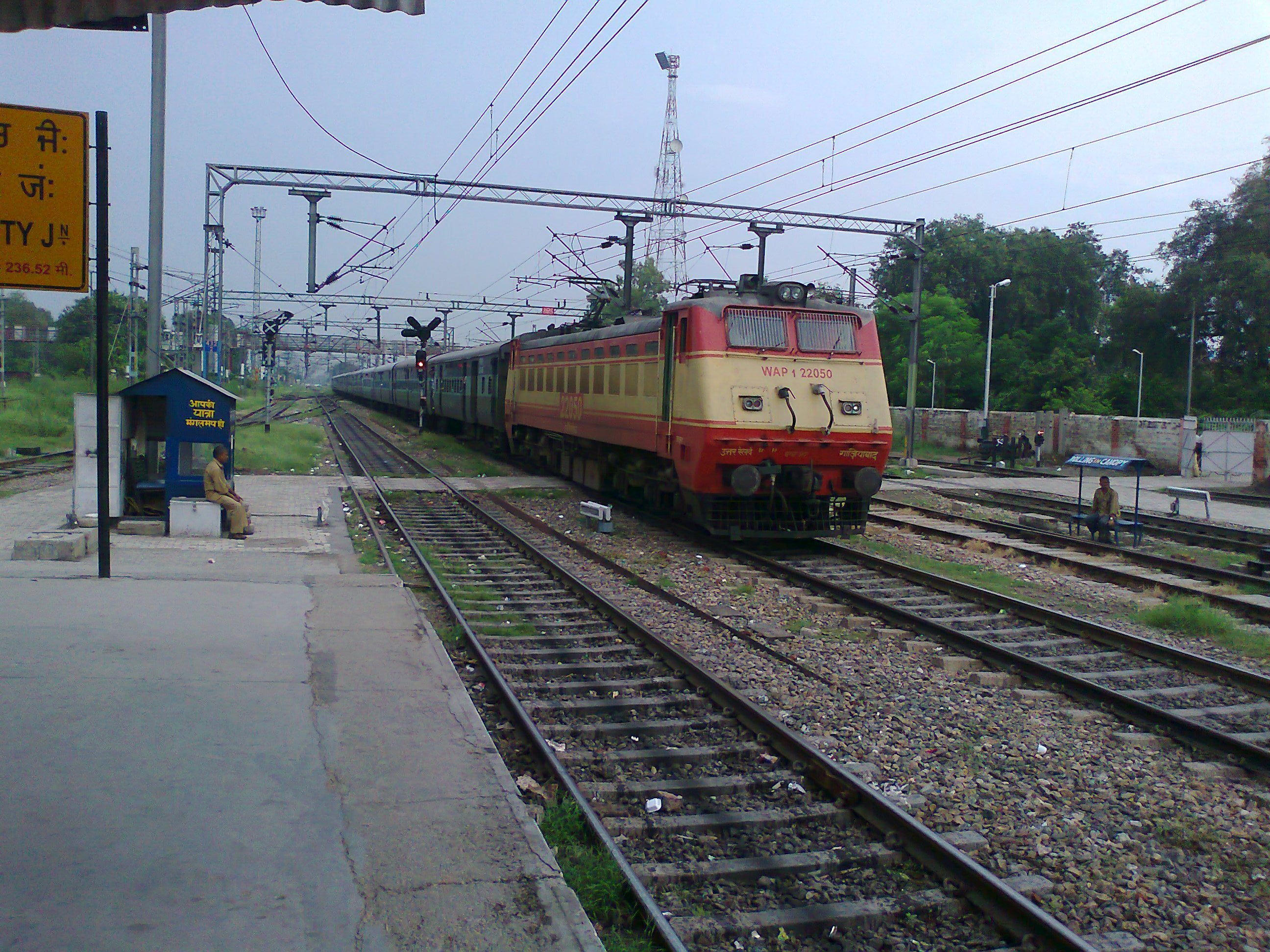

Overview
- Service type: Sampark Kranti Express
- Locale: Assam, West Bengal, Bihar, Uttar Pradesh & Delhi
- First service: 20 February 2016; 9 years ago
- Current operator: Northern Railway

Route
- Termini: Silchar (SCL); New Delhi (NDLS)
- Stops: 13
- Distance travelled: 2,280 km (1,417 mi)
- Average journey time: 41hrs 50mins
- Service frequency: Weekly
- Train number: 14037 / 14038

On-board services
- Classes: 1st Class AC, AC 2 tier, AC 3 tier, AC 3 tier economy, Sleeper class, General Unreserved
- Seating arrangements: Yes
- Sleeping arrangements: Yes
- Catering facilities: Available
- Observation facilities: Large windows
- Baggage facilities: Available

Technical
- Rolling stock: LHB coach
- Track gauge: 1,676 mm (5 ft 6 in)
- Operating speed: 55 km/h (34 mph) average including halts
Route map
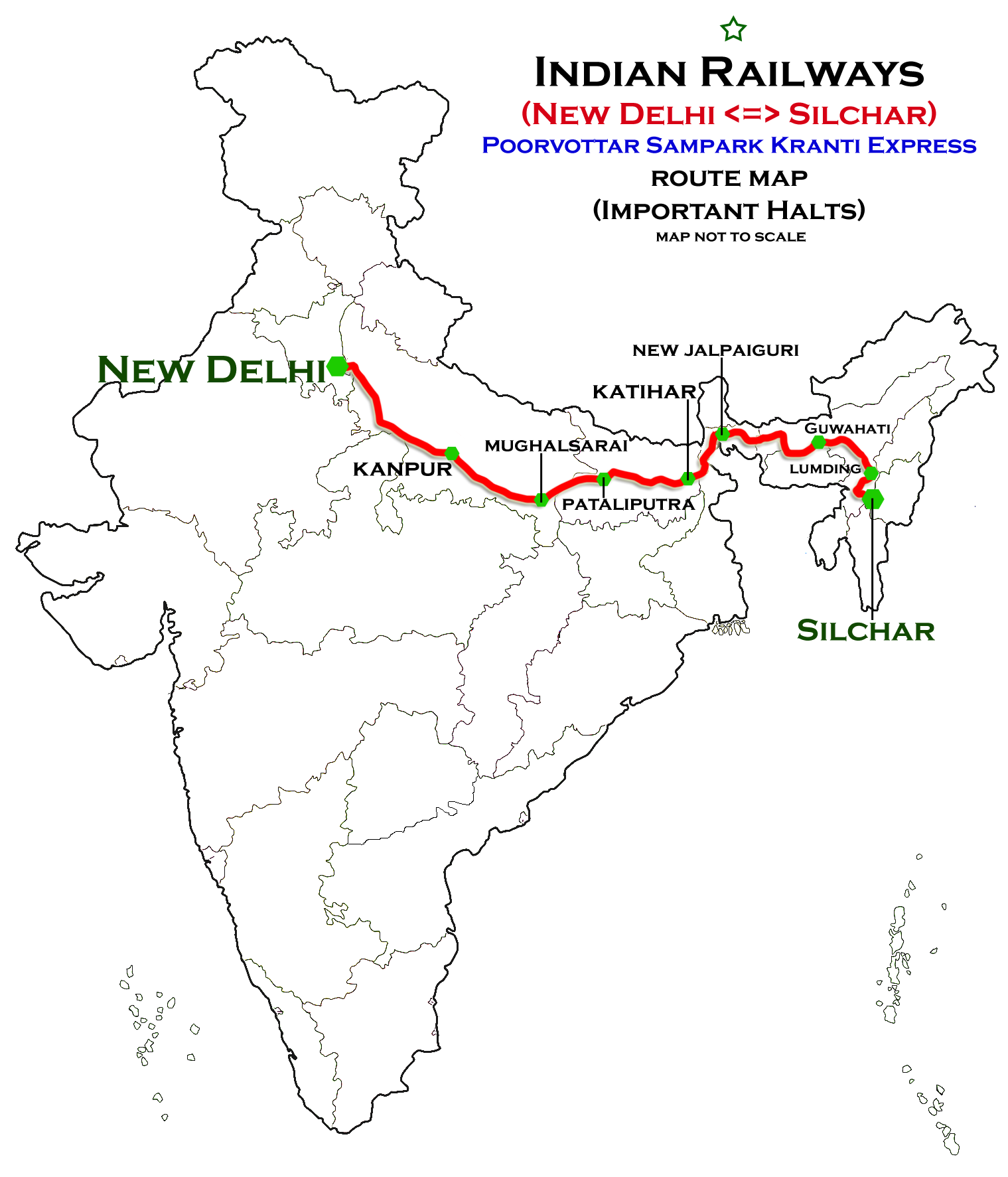

The 14037 / 14038 Silchar-New Delhi Poorvottar Sampark Kranti Express is an Sampark Kranti Express train belonging to Northern Railway zone that runs between Silchar and New Delhi in India. It is currently being operated with 14037/14038 train numbers on a weekly basis.

The train is named as Poorvottar Express since it connects New Delhi with the north east region of the country, known as Poorvottar in Hindi. This is the second Sampark Kranti Express from Assam after Poorvottar Sampark Kranti Express, running between Guwahati and New Delhi.

== Service ==
The 14037/Poorvottar Sampark Kranti Express has an average speed of 54 km/h and covers 2279 km in 42h 30m. The 14038/Poorvottar Sampark Kranti Express has an average speed of 51 km/h and covers 2279 km in 45h.

== Schedule ==
Train number	Station code	Departure station	Departure time	Departure day	Arrival station	Arrival time	Arrival day
14037	SCL	Silchar	18.30	Monday	New Delhi	13.00	Wednesday
14038	NDLS	New Delhi	23.45	Thursday	Silchar	20.40	Saturday

== Route & halts ==
The important halts of the train are:

- Silchar
- Badarpur Junction
- New Haflong
- Lumding Junction
- Guwahati
- New Bongaigaon Junction
- New Jalpaiguri Junction
- Katihar
- Barauni
- Patliputra
- Pt. Deen Dayal Upadhyaya Junction
- Prayagraj Junction
- Kanpur Central
- New Delhi.

== Coach composition ==
The train has LHB rake with a max speed of 110 kmph. The train consists of 22 coaches:

- 1 First AC
- 3 AC II Tier
- 5 AC III Tier
- 4 AC III Tier Economy
- 2 Sleeper coaches
- 1 Pantry car
- 4 Unreserved
- 2 Luggage cum Generator car

== Traction ==
Both trains are hauled by a New Guwahati Loco Shed or Siliguri Loco Shed based WDP-4 diesel locomotive from Silchar to Lumding Junction. After reaching Badarpur Junction, the trains undergo a loco reversal and are assisted by a banker locomotive up to Lumding Junction. From Lumding Junction, another loco reversal takes place, after which the trains are hauled by a Tughlakabad Loco Shed or Ghaziabad Loco Shed based WAP-7 electric locomotive from Lumding Junction to New Delhi and vice versa.

== Rake sharing ==
The train shares its rake with 22449/22450 Guwahati-New Delhi Poorvottar Sampark Kranti Express.

== Direction reversals ==
The train reverses its direction twice at:

- Lumding Junction
- Badarpur Junction.

== See also ==
- Silchar railway station
- New Delhi railway station
- Poorvottar Sampark Kranti Express
