= Tirunelveli–Shri Mata Vaishno Devi Katra Express =

Train in India

Tirunelveli-Shri Mata Vaishno Devi Katra Navyug Express
Overview
- Service type: Mail/Express train
- Current operator: Southern Railways

Route
- Termini: Shri Mata Vaishno Devi Katra (SVDK); Tirunelveli Junction (TEN)
- Stops: 64
- Distance travelled: 3,633 km (2,257 mi)
- Average journey time: 69 hours
- Service frequency: Weekly
- Train number: 16787 / 16788

On-board services
- Classes: AC 2 Tier (2A), AC 3 Tier (3A), Sleeper (SL), General, Unreserved, Ac economy
- Seating arrangements: Corridor coach
- Sleeping arrangements: Couchette car
- Catering facilities: Yes
- Baggage facilities: Over head racks

Technical
- Rolling stock: LHB coach
- Track gauge: Broad gauge
- Operating speed: 56 km/h (35 mph)

The 16787 / 16788 Tirunelveli–Shri Mata Vaishno Devi Katra Navyug Express is a weekly train running between the stations Shri Mata Vaishno Devi Katra, in Jammu and Kashmir, and Tirunelveli Junction, in Tamil Nadu. It takes about 69 hours to travel a distance of 3,633 kilometres (2,257 mi). It is currently the 40th longest-running train service of world and is the 4th-longest train service of Indian Railways. It travels through 13 states in India, with a total of 64 stops. The train takes a massive route up the Indian subcontinent crossing major junctions like Madurai, Salem, Katpadi, Vijayawada, Bhopal, Gwalior, New Delhi and Jalandhar Cantt begore reaching Katra Railway Station.

== Coach composition ==
The train has 19 LHB coaches comprising two second AC (2AC), six third AC (3AC), six couchette car/sleeper class (SL), two Unreserved coaches (UR/GS), one luggage rake (SLR) and one pantry car (PC). (Note: The coach composition is subject to change.)

Loco	1	2	3	4	5	6	7	8	9	10	11	12	13	14	15	16	17	18	19
	EOG	A1	A2	B1	B2	B3	B4	M1	M2	PC	S1	S2	S3	S4	S5	S6	UR	UR	SLR

== See also ==
- Vivek Express
- Himsagar Express
- Kerala Express
