= Kamakhya–Gomti Nagar Superfast Express =

Express train

Kamakhya - Gomti Nagar Superfast Express

Overview
- Service type: Express
- First service: 6 January 2022; 4 years ago
- Current operator: North Eastern Railways

Route
- Termini: Gomti Nagar (GTNR); Kamakhya (KYQ)
- Stops: 12
- Distance travelled: 1,379 km (857 mi)
- Average journey time: 31 hrs 10 mins
- Service frequency: Weekly
- Train number: 15077 / 15078

On-board services
- Classes: AC 2 tier, AC 3 tier, Sleeper class, General Unreserved
- Seating arrangements: Yes
- Sleeping arrangements: Yes
- Catering facilities: No
- Observation facilities: Large windows

Technical
- Rolling stock: LHB coach
- Track gauge: 1,676 mm (5 ft 6 in)
- Operating speed: 110 km/h (68 mph) maximum; 46.28 km/h (29 mph) average including halts

15077/15078 Kamakhya - Gomti Nagar Superfast Express is an Express train belonging to Indian Railways – North Eastern Railway zone that runs between Gomti Nagar railway station of Lucknow, Uttar Pradesh and Kamakhya railway station of Guwahati, Assam in India. The train in its journey covers Uttar Pradesh, Bihar, West Bengal and Assam.

== Timings ==
The train starts from Platform Number 04 of Kamakhya at 18:30 every Tuesday and reaches Platform Number 01 of Gomti Nagar on Thursday at 01:40. For reverse direction, the train starts from Gomti Nagar every Monday at 10:00 and reaches Kamakhya on Tuesday at 15:30.

== Route ==
=== Uttar Pradesh ===
- Gomti Nagar
- Gonda Junction
- Basti
- Gorakhpur Junction
- Deoria Sadar

=== Bihar ===
- Siwan Junction
- Chhapra Junction
- Hajipur Junction
- Barauni Junction
- Katihar Junction
- Kishanganj

=== West Bengal ===
- New Jalpaiguri (Siliguri)

=== Assam ===
- New Bongaigaon Junction
- Goalpara Town
- Kamakhya Junction

== Traction ==
The train is hauled by WDP-4D/WDP-4B/WDP-4 Locomotive of Diesel Loco Shed, Siliguri from Kamakhya to New Bongaigaon. Than from New Bongaigaon to Gomti Nagar, the train is hauled by WAP-7/WAP-4 Locomotive of Electric Loco Shed, Ghaziabad.

== Coach composition ==
15077/15078 Gomti Nagar - Kamakhya /Kamakhya - Gomti Nagar Express consists of Two Second AC (2AC) coaches, Six Third AC (3AC) coaches, Six Sleeper (SL) coaches, Four Second Sitting(2S) coaches Engine and One End On Generator (EOG) coach.

== See also ==
- Dibrugarh - Gomti Nagar Amrit Bharat Express
- Gomti Nagar railway station
- Kamakhya railway station
