= Sealdah–Silchar Kanchanjungha Express =

Train in India

Overview
- Service type: Express
- Locale: Assam, Bihar, Jharkhand and West Bengal
- First service: 1 February 2016; 10 years ago
- Current operators: Eastern Railway zone and Northeast Frontier Railway

Route
- Termini: Sealdah (SDAH); Silchar (SCL)
- Stops: 38
- Distance travelled: 1,359 km (844 mi)
- Average journey time: 33h 55m
- Service frequency: Tri-weekly (Note: Runs two days in a week for every direction.)
- Train number: 13175/13176

On-board services
- Classes: AC 2 tier, AC 3 tier, Sleeper class, General Unreserved
- Seating arrangements: No
- Sleeping arrangements: Yes
- Catering facilities: On-board catering; E-catering
- Observation facilities: LHB coach
- Entertainment facilities: No
- Baggage facilities: No
- Other facilities: Below the seats

Technical
- Rolling stock: 4
- Track gauge: 1,676 mm (5 ft 6 in)
- Operating speed: 45 km/h (28 mph), including halts

The Sealdah–Silchar Kanchanjungha Express is an Express train belonging to Eastern Railway zone that runs between Sealdah (Kolkata) and Silchar (Assam) in India via Barddhaman, Rampurhat, Malda Town, New Jalpaiguri, Guwahati. It is currently being operated with 13175/13176 train numbers on a tri-weekly basis.The another Kanchanjungha Express operates on the Sealdah–Sabroom route.

== Major halts ==
Bardhaman, Rampurhat, Malda Town, New Jalpaiguri, New Cooch Behar, New Bongaigaon Junction, Guwahati, Lumding, Badarpur

== Locomotive ==
this train completely run end to end by WAP-4 or WDG-4D so was WDM-3A and WDM-3D carry with or without push-pull configuration

== See also ==
- Agartala railway station
- Silchar railway station
- Sealdah–Sabroom Kanchanjungha Express
- Kanchanjungha Express

== Other trains on the Kolkata–New Jalpaiguri sector ==
- 12041/42 Howrah–New Jalpaiguri Shatabdi Express
- 22301/02 Howrah–New Jalpaiguri Vande Bharat Express
- 12377/78 Padatik Express
- 12343/44 Darjeeling Mail
- 15959/60 Kamrup Express
- 13175/76 Sealdah–Silchar Kanchanjungha Express
- 12345/46 Saraighat Express
- 15721/22 New Jalpaiguri–Digha Express
- 12516/15 Silchar–Coimbatore Superfast Express
- 15961/62 Kamrup Express
- 13141/42 Teesta Torsha Express
- 13147/48 Uttar Banga Express
- 12503/04 Agartala–SMVT Bengaluru Humsafar Express
- 13181/82 Kolkata–Silghat Town Kaziranga Express
- 22511/12 Lokmanya Tilak Terminus–Kamakhya Karmabhoomi Express
- 15643/44 Puri–Kamakhya Weekly Express (via Howrah)
- 12363/64 Kolkata–Haldibari Intercity Express
- 12509/10 Kaziranga Superfast Express
- 12507/08 Thiruvananthapuram–Silchar Superfast Express
- 12513/14 Silchar–Secunderabad Express
- 22503/04 Dibrugarh–Kanniyakumari Vivek Express
