= Poorvottar Sampark Kranti Express =

Train in India

Guwahati-New Delhi Poorvottar Sampark Kranti Express
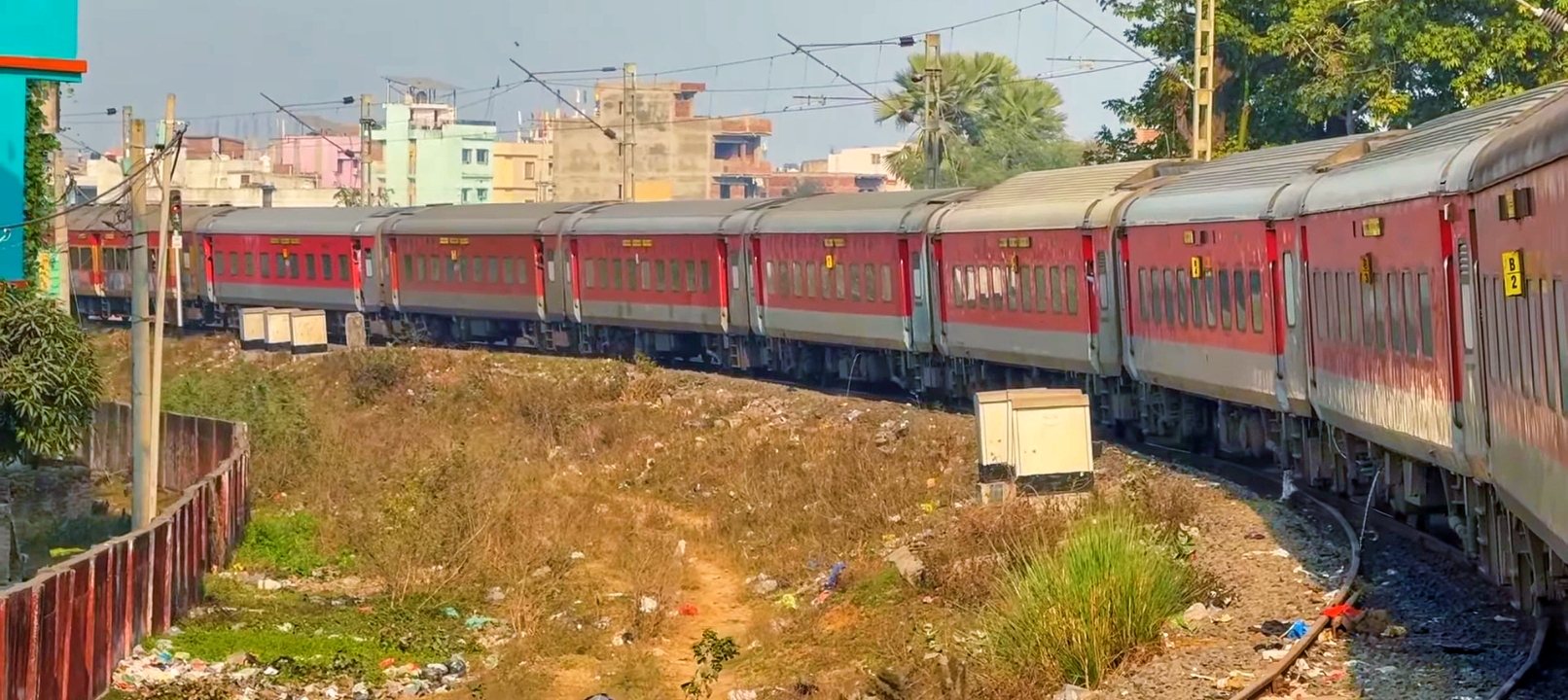
- Poorvottar Sampark Kranti Express At Barauni Junction

Overview
- Service type: Sampark Kranti Express
- Locale: Assam, West Bengal, Bihar, Uttar Pradesh & Delhi
- First service: 11 March 2005; 21 years ago
- Current operator: Northern Railway

Route
- Termini: Guwahati (GHY); New Delhi (NDLS)
- Stops: 13
- Distance travelled: 1,900 km (1,200 mi)
- Average journey time: 32 hours 15 minutes
- Service frequency: Bi-weekly
- Train number: 22449 / 22450

On-board services
- Classes: AC First Class, AC 2 Tier, AC 3 Tier,AC 3 Economy , Sleeper Class, General Unreserved
- Seating arrangements: Yes
- Sleeping arrangements: Yes
- Catering facilities: Available
- Observation facilities: Large windows
- Baggage facilities: No
- Other facilities: Below the seats

Technical
- Rolling stock: LHB coach
- Track gauge: 1,676 mm (5 ft 6 in)
- Operating speed: 62 km/h (39 mph) average including halts.
Route map
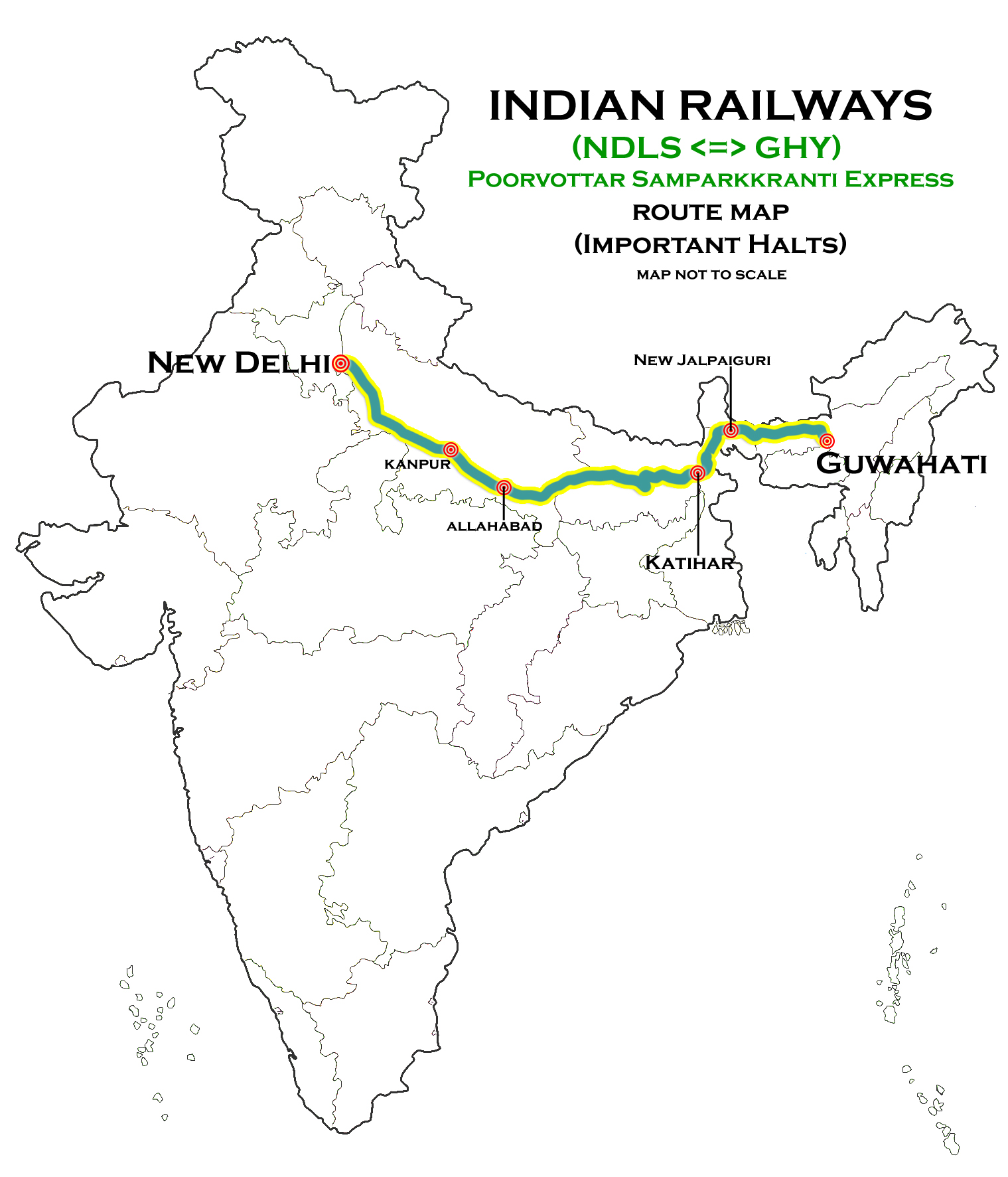

The 22449 / 22450 Guwahati-New Delhi Poorvottar Sampark Kranti Express is one of the Sampark Kranti Express trains of Indian Railways. It connects New Delhi, the capital city of India with Guwahati, the capital city of Assam. The train is named as Poorvottar Express since it connects New Delhi with the northeast region of the country, known as Poorvottar in Hindi.

== Service ==
Guwahati-New Delhi 22449/22450 (from 1 April 2020), Poorvottar Sampark Kranti Express takes approximately 32 hours to complete a distance of 1898 km. En route it stops at Goalpara Town, New Bongaigaon, New Jalpaiguri, Katihar, Patliputra Jn, Mughalsarai Jn, Prayagraj Jn and Govindpuri in both up and down journey, with technical halt at Barauni Junction. This train belongs to Northern Railway zone of the Indian Railways. Usually late departure from New Delhi Station.

== Coaches ==
The train consists of one composite 1A/2A coach (HA-1), three 2A coaches (A-1/A-2/A-3), five 3A coaches (B-1/B-2/B-3/B-4/B-5), four 3E coaches (M-1/M-2/M-3/M-4),two sleeper coaches (S-1/S-2), one pantry car (P-C), four general coaches, two luggage cum parcel car (LPR) and one Parcel cum guard (PV) . Total coach count is 23. On 28 November 2019, the conventional coaches were converted into LHB coach.

== Route & halts ==
- New Delhi
- Govindpuri
- Prayagraj Junction
- Pt. Deen Dayal Upadhyaya Junction
- Patliputra Junction
- Barauni Junction
- Begusarai
- Kishanganj
- Katihar
- New Jalpaiguri
- New Cooch Behar
- New Bongaigaon
- Guwahati

== Traction ==
The train is hauled by a Ghaziabad Loco Shed-based WAP-5 / WAP-7 electric locomotive on its entire journey.

== Rake sharing ==
The train shares its rake with 14037/14038 Silchar–New Delhi Poorvottar Sampark Kranti Express.

== See also ==
- Guwahati railway station
- New Delhi railway station
- Silchar–New Delhi Poorvottar Sampark Kranti Express
