= Rangiya–Silchar Express =

Express train in India

Rangiya – Silchar Express
Overview
- Service type: Mail/Express
- Locale: Assam
- First service: Thu Feb 01, 2018
- Current operator: Northeast Frontier Railway
- Ridership: 900+ approx.

Route
- Termini: Rangiya; Silchar
- Stops: 17
- Distance travelled: 235 km (146 mi)
- Average journey time: 12 hours 30 mins
- Service frequency: Daily
- Train number: 15611 UP / 15612 DOWN

On-board services
- Class: AC 2 tier (2) AC 3 tier (4) Sleeper (10) General (4) SLR (2)
- Seating arrangements: Available
- Sleeping arrangements: Available
- Auto-rack arrangements: Not Available
- Catering facilities: ✕ Pantry Car ✓ On-board Catering ✓ E-Catering
- Observation facilities: Windows
- Baggage facilities: Under Seat

Technical
- Rolling stock: LHB coach
- Track gauge: Broad gauge
- Electrification: Not Available
- Operating speed: Avg Speed: 37 km/h (23 mph) Max Permissible Speed: 100 km/h (62 mph) between LMG/Lumding Junction and TKC/Thakurkuchi

Rangiya–Silchar Express is an Express train belonging to Northeast Frontier Railway zone of Indian Railways that connects Rangiya and Silchar of Assam via Guwahati. This train is a replacement of previous train, Silchar - Guwahati Passenger Special, for the same route & on the same timings. The train makes its main halt at Badarpur Junction & Lumding Junction for 10 mins and 15 mins respectively & loco/rake reversals also take place at these Stations. The train runs with SGUJ/WDP-4. From 4 September 2023, the train was extended to Rangiya Junction.

== Background ==
This train was inaugurated on 1 February 2018, from Guwahati flagged off by Piyush Goyal, Minister of Railways for more connectivity between Silchar and Guwahati. The Silchar–Rangiya–Silchar Express (Train Nos. 15611/15612) was upgraded to modern LHB coaches starting 11th February 2026. The new service was inaugurated at Silchar Railway Station, replacing the old ICF coaches to improve passenger safety, comfort, and hygiene.

== Service ==
Frequency of this train is six days of week, and it covers a distance of 379 km (235 mi) with an average speed of 37 km/h (23 mph) on both sides.

== Halts ==
15612 - Silchar-Rangiya Express
| Station | Arrival | Departure | Stop Time | Distance Travelled (KM) |
|---|---|---|---|---|
| Silchar (SCL) | Starts | 23:00 | Starts | 0 |
| Katakhal Jn (KTX) | 23:31 | 23:33 | 2 mins | 20 |
| Badarpur Jn (BPB)* (Note: They operate with loco/rake reversals at Badarpur Junction and Lumding Junction including banker locomotive.) | 00:05 | 00:15 | 10 mins | 30 |
| New Harangajao (NHGJ) | 01:26 | 01:28 | 2 mins | 81 |
| New Haflong (NHLG) | 02:20 | 02:22 | 2 mins | 101 |
| Mahur (MXR) | 02:40 | 02:42 | 2 mins | 114 |
| Maibang (MBG) | 03:38 | 03:40 | 2 mins | 133 |
| Lumding Jn (LMG) | 05:55 | 06:10 | 15 mins | 199 |
| Lanka (LKA) | 06:35 | 06:37 | 2 mins | 229 |
| Hojai (HJI) | 06:45 | 06:47 | 2 mins | 244 |
| Jamunamukh (JMK) | 07:00 | 07:02 | 2 mins | 261 |
| Chaparmukh Jn (CPK) | 07:20 | 07:22 | 2 mins | 289 |
| Jagi Road (JID) | 07:47 | 07:49 | 2 mins | 324 |
| Guwahati (GHY) | 09:25 | 09:35 | 10 mins | 381 |
| Kamakhya (KYQ) | 09:50 | 09:52 | 2 mins | 389 |
| Changsari (CGS) | 10:25 | 10:27 | 2 mins | 401 |
| Rangiya Jn (RNY) | End | 00:00 | End | 427 |

15611 - Rangiya-Silchar Express
| Station | Arrival | Departure | Stop Time | Distance Travelled (KM) |
|---|---|---|---|---|
| Rangiya Jn (RNY) | Starts | 19:00 | Starts | 0 |
| Changsari (CGS) | 19:28 | 19:30 | 2 mins | 26 |
| Kamakhya (KYQ) | 19:57 | 19:59 | 2 mins | 38 |
| Guwahati (GHY) | 20:15 | 20:25 | 10 mins | 45 |
| Jagi Road (JID) | 21:18 | 21:20 | 2 mins | 103 |
| Chaparmukh Jn (CPK) | 21:46 | 21:48 | 2 mins | 139 |
| Jamunamukh (JMK) | 22:08 | 22:10 | 2 mins | 166 |
| Hojai (HJI) | 22:23 | 22:25 | 2 mins | 184 |
| Lanka (LKA) | 22:38 | 22:40 | 2 mins | 199 |
| Lumding Jn (LMG)* | 23:30 | 23:45 | 15 mins | 229 |
| Maibang (MBG) | 01:17 | 01:19 | 2 mins | 294 |
| Mahur (MXR) | 02:38 | 02:40 | 2 mins | 313 |
| New Haflong (NHLG) | 03:00 | 03:02 | 2 mins | 327 |
| New Harangajao (NHGJ) | 03:50 | 03:52 | 2 mins | 346 |
| Badarpur Jn (BPB)* | 05:40 | 05:50 | 10 mins | 398 |
| Katakhal Jn (KTX) | 06:20 | 06:22 | 2 mins | 408 |
| Silchar (SCL) | End | 00:00 | End | 427 |

== Traction ==
As the route is going to be electrified an WDP-4 loco pulls the train to its destination on both sides.
