= New Bongaigaon Railway Colony =

- city
- Location in Assam, India New Bongaigaon Railway Colony (India)
- Coordinates: 26.4667°N 90.5667°E
- Country: India
- State: Assam
- District: Bongaigaon

Population (2001)
  - Total: 15,847

Languages
  - Official: Assamese
- Time zone: UTC+5:30 (IST)
- Vehicle registration: AS

New Bongaigaon Railway Colony is a census town in Bongaigaon district in the Indian state of Assam.

== Demographics ==
As of 2001 India census, New Bongaigaon Railway Colony had a population of 15,847. Males constitute 54% of the population and females 46%. New Bongaigaon Railway Colony has an average literacy rate of 77%, higher than the national average of 59.5%: male literacy is 82%, and female literacy is 70%. In New Bongaigaon Railway Colony, 10% of the population is under 6 years of age.
