= Silchar railway station =

Railway station in Assam, India

Silchar

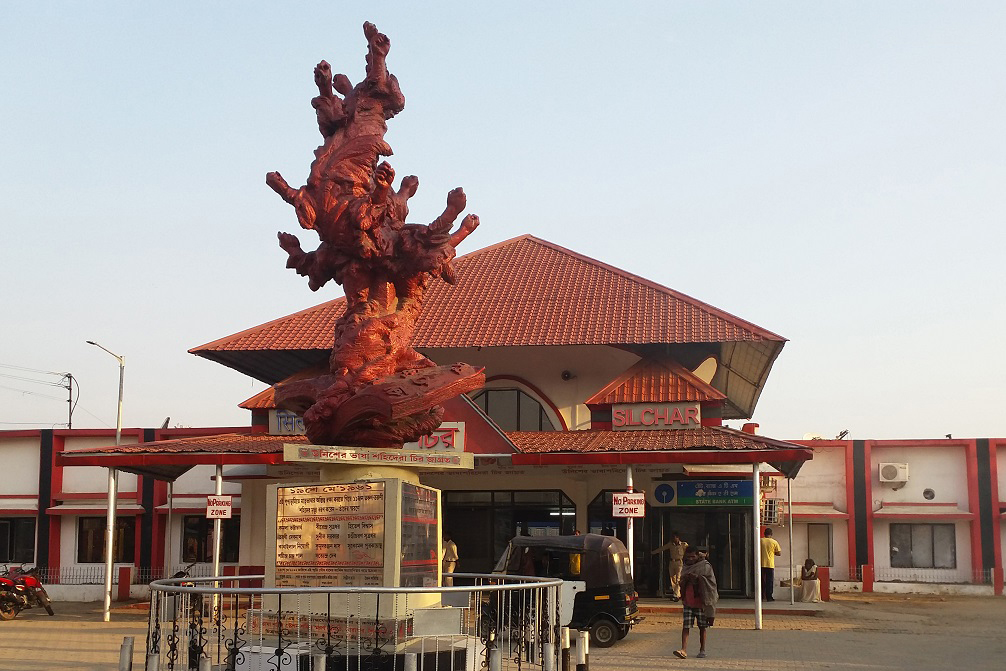
- Silchar Railway Station

General information
- Location: Station Road, Tarapur, Silchar-788003, Barak Valley, Assam; India
- Coordinates: 24°49′12″N 92°48′00″E
- Elevation: 20 m (66 ft)
- System: Regional rail & Light rail station
- Owner: Indian Railways
- Operator: Northeast Frontier Railway zone
- Line: Silchar–Sabroom section
- Platforms: 3
- Tracks: 9
- Connections: Bus; Auto rickshaw E–Rickshaw

Construction
- Structure type: At grade
- Parking: Available
- Cycle facilities: Available
- Accessible: Yes

Other information
- Status: Functioning
- Station code: SCL
- Zone(s): Northeast Frontier
- Division(s): Lumding

History
- Opened: 1898; 128 years ago
- Electrified: Yes

Services
Location
- Location within Assam Location within India

Silchar railway station is a railway station situated at Tarapur, Silchar in Assam. The railway station falls under the jurisdiction of the Northeast Frontier Railway zone of the Indian Railways. The railway gauge functioned here is broad gauge. The station consists of single diesel line. It is one of the oldest railway station in India built under Assam Bengal Railway. The station has three platforms with a total of 14 originating trains. It serves Silchar, as well as the whole Barak Valley. Trains operate to different cities of India from Silchar including Delhi, Kolkata, Chennai, Visakhapatnam, Kanpur, Patna, Prayagraj, Hyderabad , Coimbatore, Vijayawada, Guwahati, Bhubaneswar, Thiruvananthapuram, Agartala and Dibrugarh. As of now, 170 stations across India are directly connected to Silchar railway station.

== History ==
The Station was first inaugurated in 1898 under Assam Bengal Railway. Assam Bengal Railway was incorporated in 1892 to serve British-owned tea plantations in Assam. Assam Bengal Railway had III sections & Silchar railway station come under Section I named as Comilla–Akhaura–Kulaura–Badarpur section opened in 1896–1898 and finally extended to Lumding in 1903.

== Amenities ==
The station contains three platforms serving several passengers. It contains retiring rooms or passenger waiting rooms with proper sanitation facilities. The Station is upgraded with reservation facilities through ticket counters in the year 1995. It is also upgraded with RailTel free WiFi facilities. The station is also upgraded with a Digital Museum Video Wall on the entrance of the station that will showcase the rich heritage of Indian Railways and other information related to rail travellers

== Incidents ==
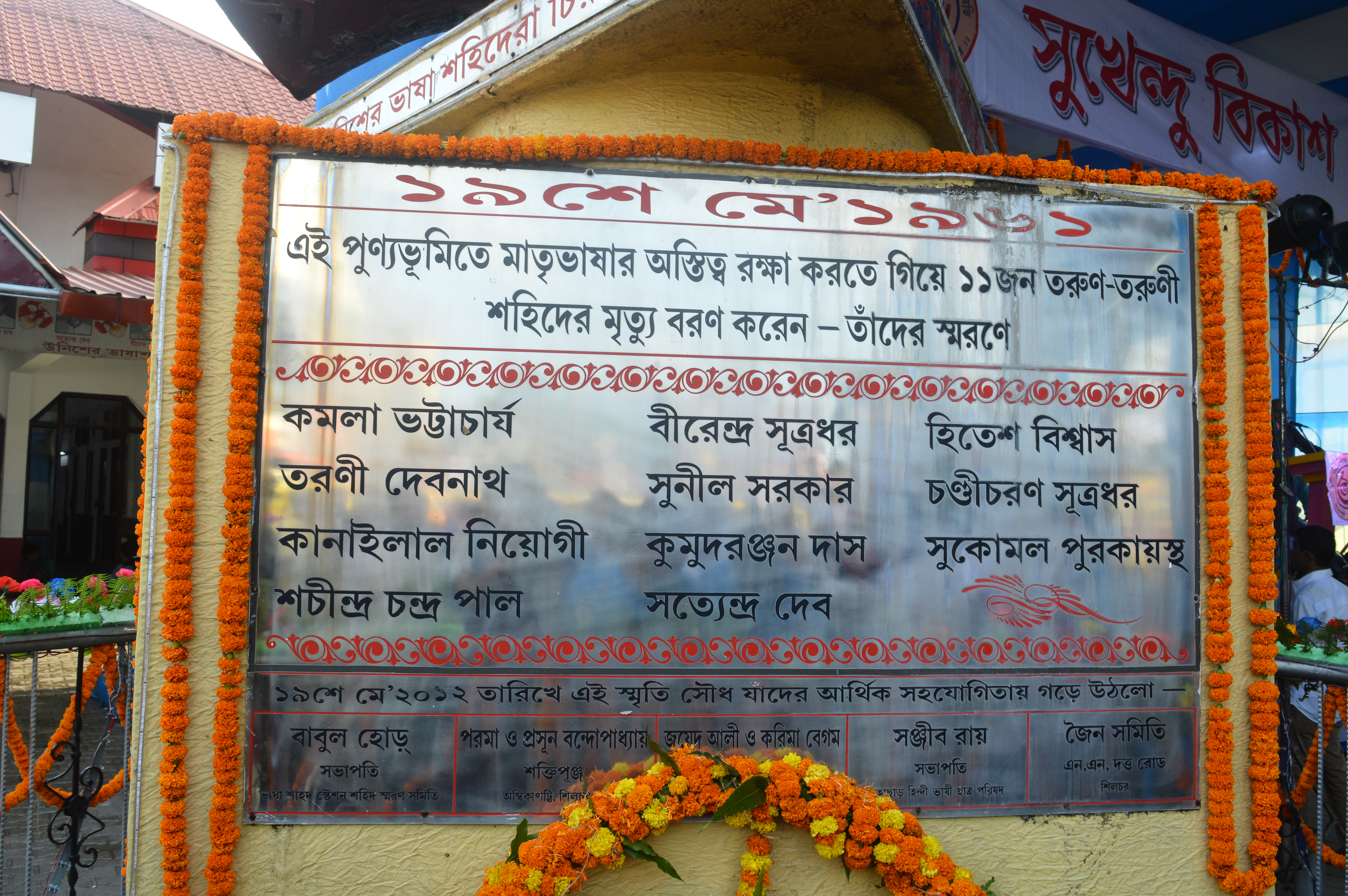
Language Martyr's Memorial at Silchar railway station

Silchar railway station was the location of one of the uprisings in support of the Bengali language. When the Assam government, under Chief Minister Bimala Prasad Chaliha, passed a circular to make Assamese mandatory, Bengalis of Barak Valley protested. On 19 May 1961, during the Bengali Language Movement of Barak Valley, Assam police opened fire on unarmed demonstrators at Silchar railway station. Eleven protesters were killed. After the popular revolt, the Assam government had to withdraw the circular and the Bengali language was ultimately given official status in the three districts of Barak Valley. Every year, 19 May is celebrated as Bhasha Shahid Divas to commemorate the incident.

On 9 June 2019, three coaches of Silchar–Trivandram Express caught fire in the early hours of Sunday, while it was stationed at Silchar railway station. No casualties were recorded.

== Security ==
In 2020, High definition CCTV cameras were installed at platforms, circulating and waiting areas of Silchar railway station by Northeast Frontier Railway (NFR) under ISS (integrated security system) to ensure round-the-clock security to passengers, especially women.

== Major trains ==
- Silchar–New Delhi Poorvottar Sampark Kranti Express
- Thiruvananthapuram–Silchar Express
- Silchar-Coimbatore Express
- Silchar–Charlapalli Express
- Sealdah–Silchar Kanchanjunga Express
- Barak–Brahmaputra Express
- Rangiya–Silchar Express

== Gallery ==
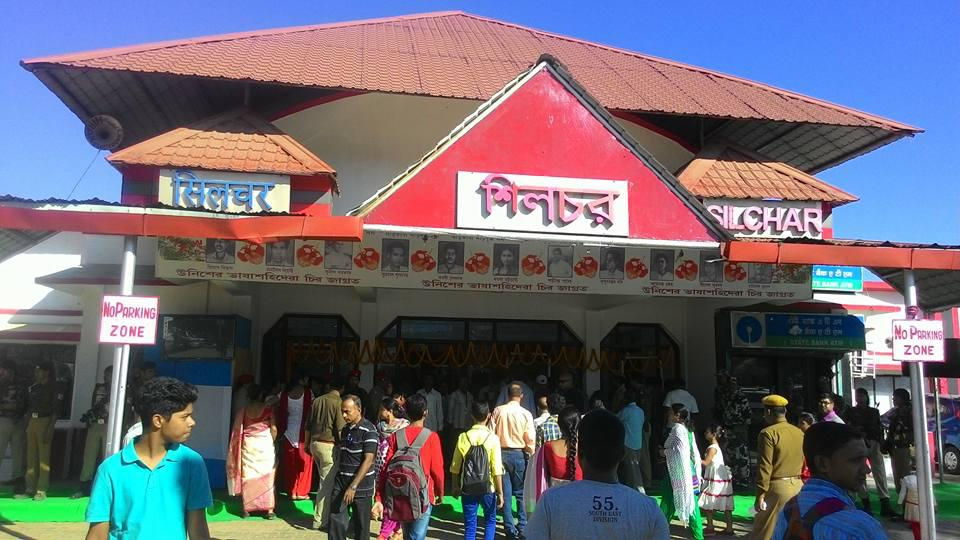
Front view

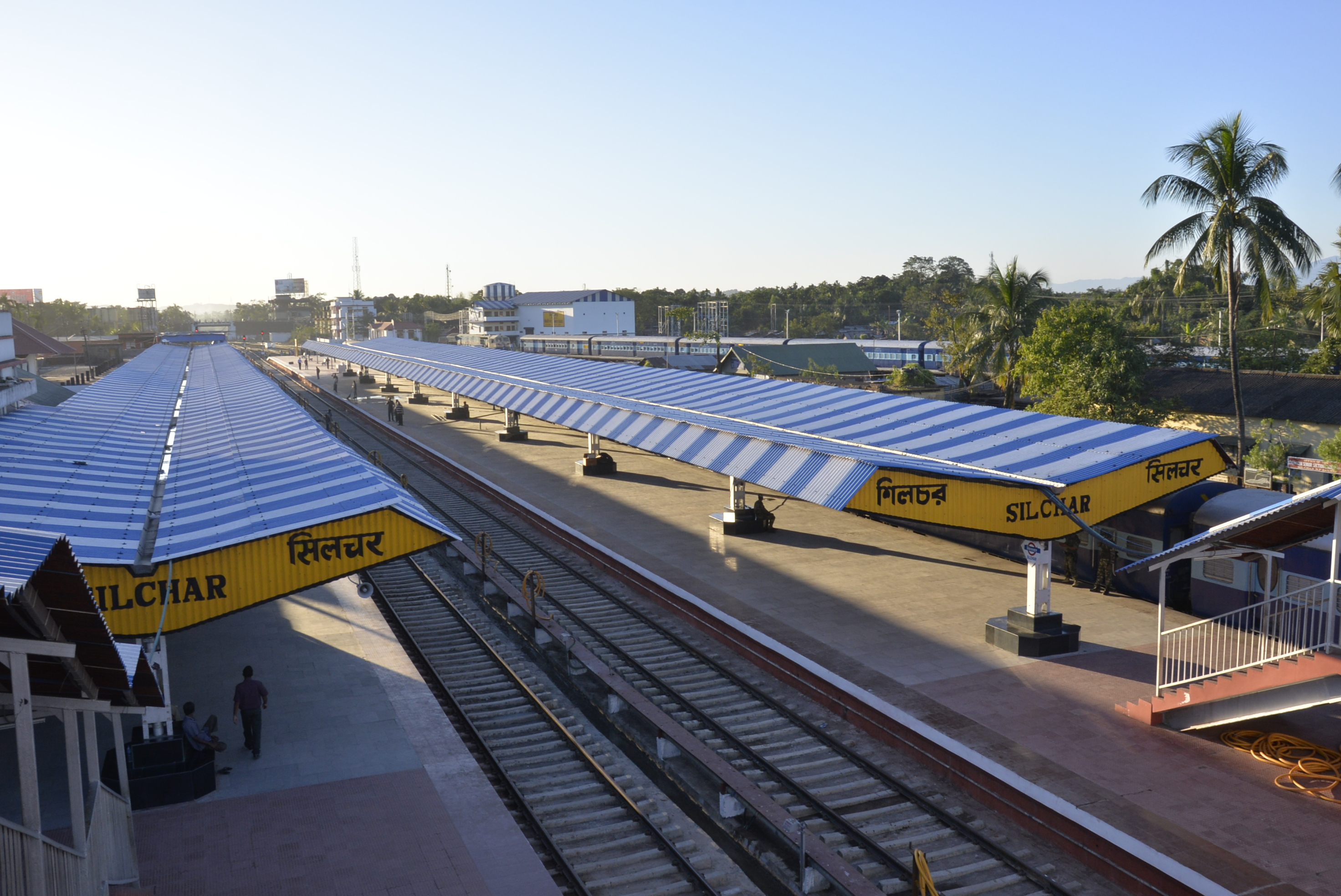
Platforms

== See also ==
- North Eastern Railway Connectivity Project
- North Western Railway zone
- Assam Bengal Railway
- Silchar (Lok Sabha constituency)
- Silchar (Vidhan Sabha constituency)
