= Silchar–Secunderabad Express =

Train in India

Silchar–Charlapalli Express

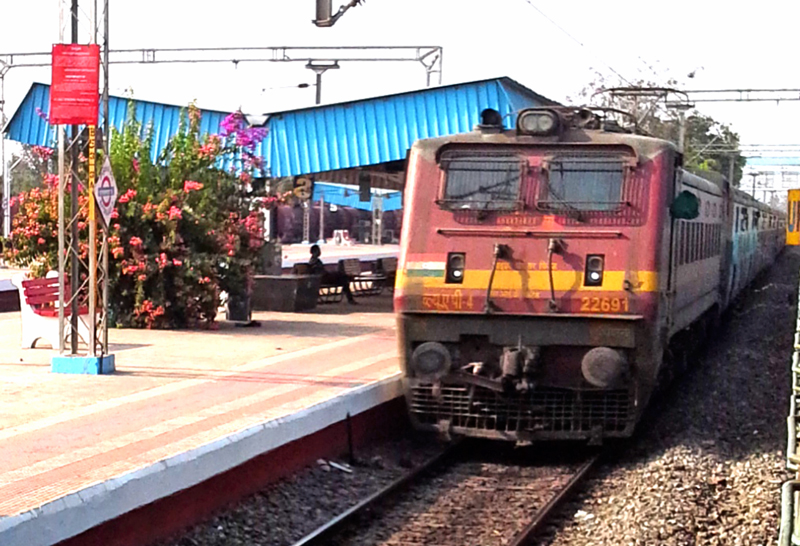
- Silchar–Charlapalli Express with WAP 4 loco spotted at Kottavalasa Junction

Overview
- Service type: Mail/Express
- Locale: Assam, West Bengal, Bihar, Odisha, Andhra Pradesh & Telangana
- First service: 11 January 2004; 22 years ago (service to Guwahati); 21 October 2023; 3 years ago (extended to Silchar)
- Current operator: Northeast Frontier Railway

Route
- Termini: Silchar (SCL); Charlapalli (CHZ)
- Stops: 35
- Distance travelled: 2,932 km (1,822 mi)
- Average journey time: 45h 40m
- Service frequency: Weekly
- Train number: 15645/15646

On-board services
- Classes: AC 3 tier Economy, AC 2 tier, AC 3 tier, Sleeper class and General Unreserved
- Seating arrangements: Yes
- Sleeping arrangements: Yes
- Catering facilities: Pantry car, on-board catering, E-catering
- Observation facilities: Large windows
- Entertainment facilities: No
- Baggage facilities: Below the seats

Technical
- Rolling stock: LHB coach
- Track gauge: 5 ft 6 in (1,676 mm) (Broad gauge)
- Operating speed: 56 km/h (35 mph) (average with halts) 110 km/h (68 mph) (maximum)
Route map
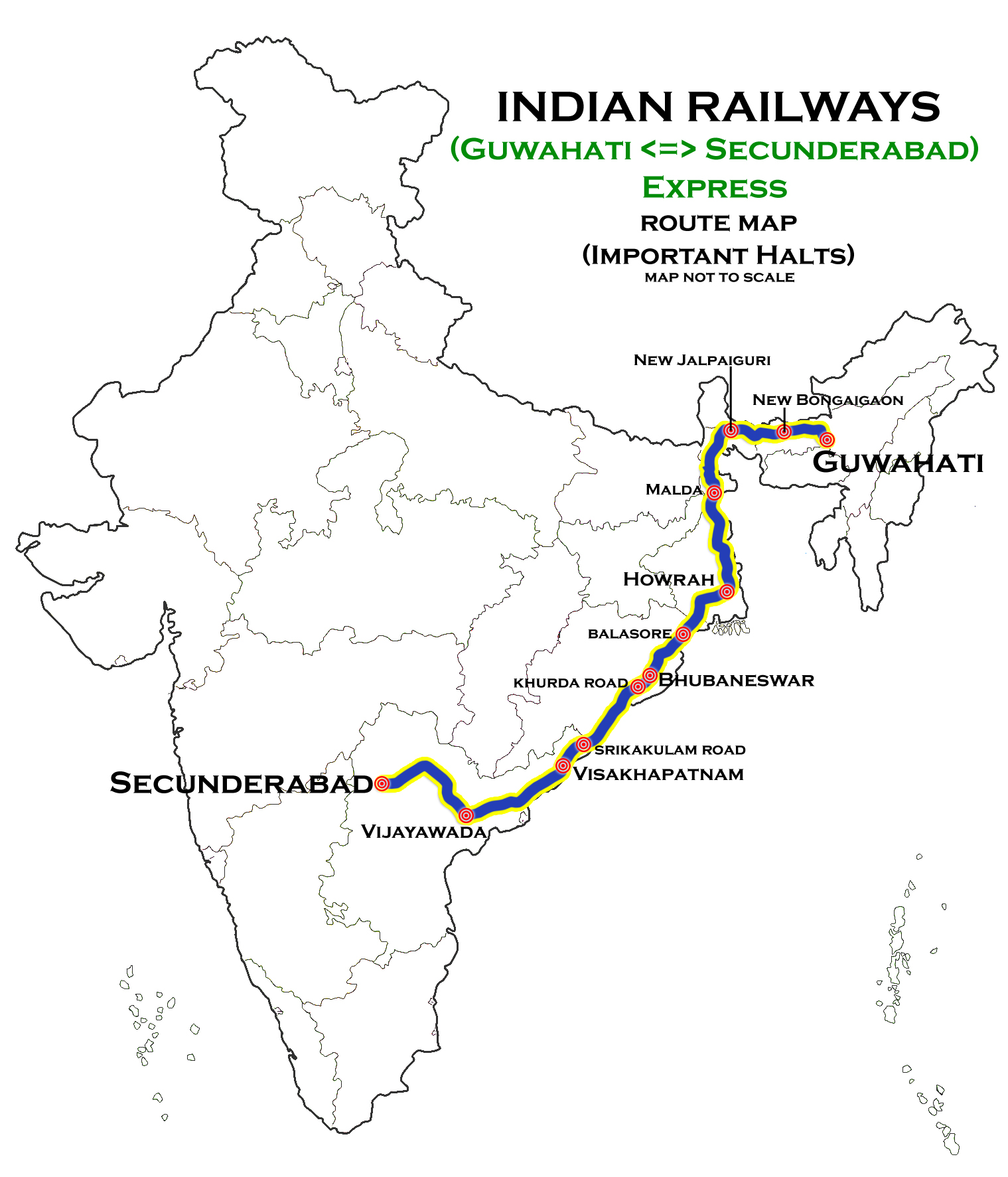

The Silchar–Charlapalli (Secunderabad) Express is a Express train operated by Northeast Frontier Railway zone of Indian Railways that runs between Silchar, and Charlapalli, via Guwahati, Malda Town, Rampurhat, Kharagpur. The train is currently being replace in 12513/12514 with new train number 15645/15646 on a weekly basis. Earlier this train was run between Guwahati and Secunderabad. From 21 October 2023, the train is being extended up to Silchar. Silchar-Secunderabad Superfast Express had its terminal changed from Secunderabad to Charlapalli on 9 April 2025, for the departure from Silchar and 12 April 2025, for the departure from the new terminal, Charlapalli.

== Overview ==
It is another fast alternative next after Falaknuma Express on this route. The train has less halts than any other train from Kolkata/Bhubaneswar to Charlapalli as it has just three halts between Vishakhapatnam and Secunderabad. Though it's a superfast train, it is less clean comparing to other trains.

The 12514/Silchar–Charlapalli Express has an average speed of 55 km/h and covers 2932 km in 45h 40m. The Charlapalli–Silchar Express has an average speed of 54 km/h and covers the same distance in 46h 30m.

This train is now diverted via Guntur.

== Route ==
ASSAM (12 Stops)

1. Silchar (starts)
2. Badarpur
3. New Haflong
4. Manderdisa
5. Hojai
6. Jagiroad
7. Guwahati Railway Station
8. Kamakhya
9. Rangiya Junction
10. New Bongaigaon Junction

BIHAR (2 stops)

1. Kishanganj
2. Barsoi Junction

WEST BENGAL (09 Stops)

1. New Alipurduar
2. New Cooch Behar
3. New Jalpaiguri (Siliguri)
4. Malda Town
5. New Farakka Junction
6. Rampurhat Junction
7. Bolpur Shantiniketan
8. Dankuni (Kolkata)
9. Kharagpur Junction

ODISHA (08 Stops)

1. Balasore
2. Bhadrak
3. Jajpur Keonjhar Road
4. Cuttack Junction
5. Bhubaneswar
6. Khurda Road Junction
7. Balugaon
8. Brahmapur

ANDHRA PRADESH (07 Stops)

1. Palasa
2. Srikakulam
3. Vizianagaram Junction
4. Visakhapatnam
5. Rajahmundry
6. Vijayawada
7. Guntur

TELANGANA (01 Stop)

1. Charlapalli (Ends)

Note: Bold letters indicate Major Railway Stations/Major Cities.

== Timings ==
The train departs from Silchar at 19:30 IST, every Wednesday and arrives at Charlapalli at 4:15 IST, every Saturdays. From Charlapalli, the train departs at 04:45 IST, every Saturday and arrives at Silchar at 23:40 IST, every Monday.

== Classes ==
earlier was ICF rakes. The train usually consists of a massive load of 23 standard LHB coach:

- 1 HCP
- 2 AC Three Tier Economy
- 2 AC Two Tier
- 1 Luggage Brake & Generator Car
- 4 AC Three Tiers
- 7 Sleeper classes
- 4 General (unreserved)
- 1 Pantry car
- 1 Seating (Ladies/Disabled) Cum Luggage Rake.

As is customary with most other train services in India, coach composition may be amended at the discretion of Indian Railways, depending on demand.

== Traction ==
As some part of the route of Northeast Frontier Railway is under electrification, so a Diesel Loco Shed, Siliguri-based WDP-4/4DWDM-3A diesel locomotive hauls the train from Silchar to Chaparmukh. From Guwahati to Visakhapatnam, the train is hauled by WAP-4 locomotive of Santragachi loco shed. Finally, from Visakhapatnam to Charlapalli, the train is hauled by WAP-4/WAP-7 locomotive of Vijayawada loco shed.

Same pattern follows for reverse journey as well.
