= Aronai Express =

Train of India

Overview
- Service type: Express
- First service: 14 April 1987; 39 years ago (Inaugural run); 21 November 2017; 9 years ago (extended upto Silchar)
- Current operator: Northeast Frontier Railway

Route
- Termini: Thiruvananthapuram Central (TVC); Silchar (SCL)
- Stops: 55
- Distance travelled: 3,915 km (2,433 mi)
- Average journey time: 71 hrs 20 mins
- Service frequency: Weekly
- Train number: 15607 / 15608

On-board services
- Classes: AC three tier economy, AC 2 Tier, AC 3 Tier, Sleeper Class, General Unreserved
- Seating arrangements: Yes
- Sleeping arrangements: Yes
- Catering facilities: Available
- Observation facilities: Large windows
- Baggage facilities: Available
- Other facilities: Below the seats

Technical
- Rolling stock: LHB coach
- Track gauge: 1,676 mm (5 ft 6 in)
- Electrification: Partial, Route Electrified Until Lumding in Assam
- Operating speed: 45 km/h (28 mph) average including halts.
Route map
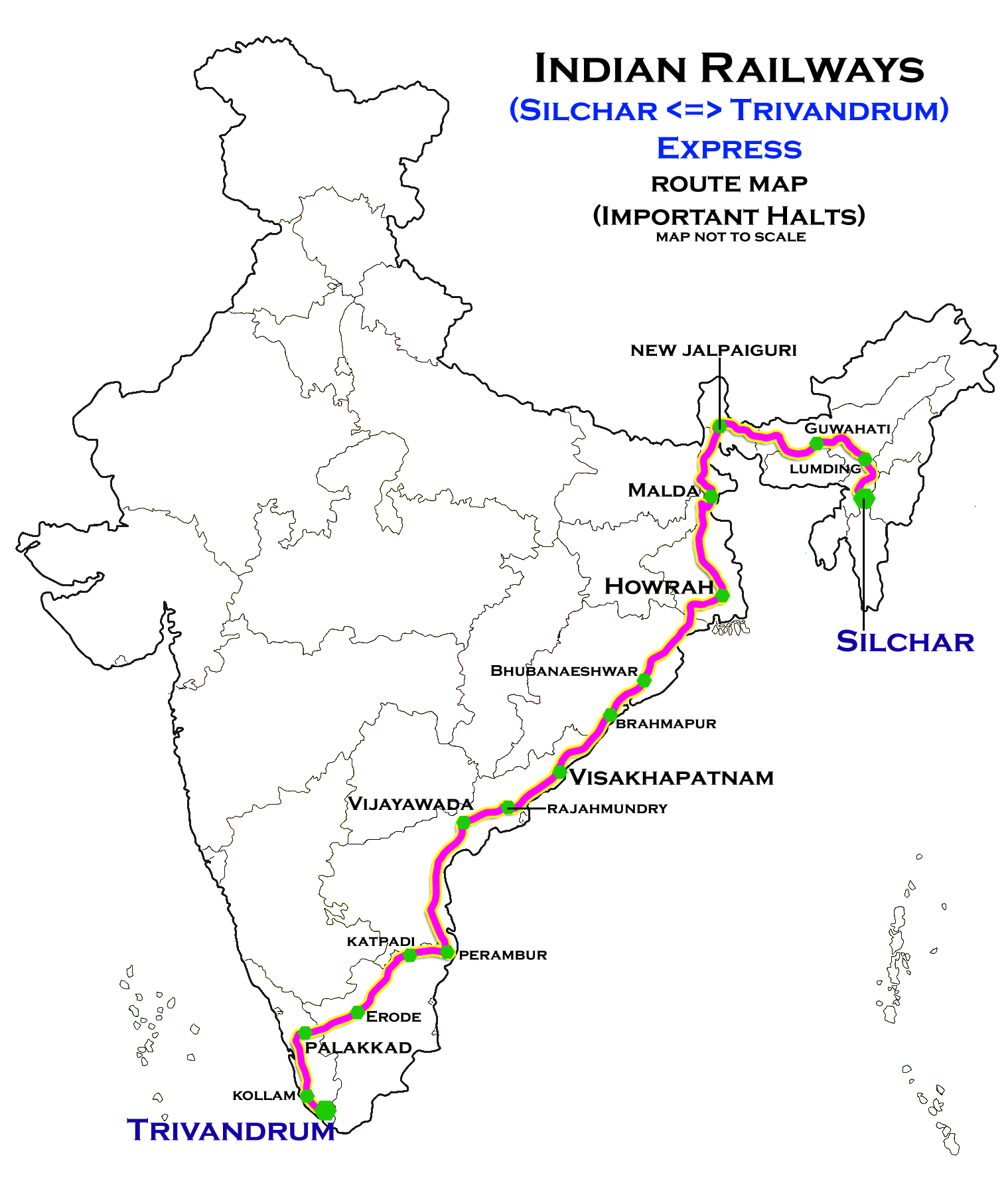

The 15607 / 15608 Aronai Express is a express train belonging to Indian Railways. It is operated by Northeast Frontier Railway zone that runs between Thiruvananthapuram Central in Kerala and Silchar in Assam. It is the 28th longest train service in the world. Initially, Thiruvananthapuram–Silchar Aronai Express ran between Thiruvananthapuram Central and Guwahati via Katpadi, Cuttack, Kharagpur, Rampurhat, Malda Town, New Jalpaiguri. On 21 November 2017, it was extended to Silchar. After this extension, it is now the second longest running train in India.

The express train service was started on 14 April 1987. It operates as train number 12507 from Thiruvananthapuram Central to Silchar and as train number 12508 in the reverse direction serving the 8 states of Assam, West Bengal, Bihar, Jharkhand, Odisha, Andhra Pradesh, Tamil Nadu and Kerala. The Indian Railways has decided to degrade this train from Superfast Express to Express with new numbers 15607/15608.

== Service ==
The 12508 Silchar–Thiruvananthapuram Central Aronai Express covers a distance of 3,915 km (2,433 mi), with a total travel time of 74 hours and 44 minutes, travelling at a speed of 44.6 km/h (27.7 mph).

== Major stops ==
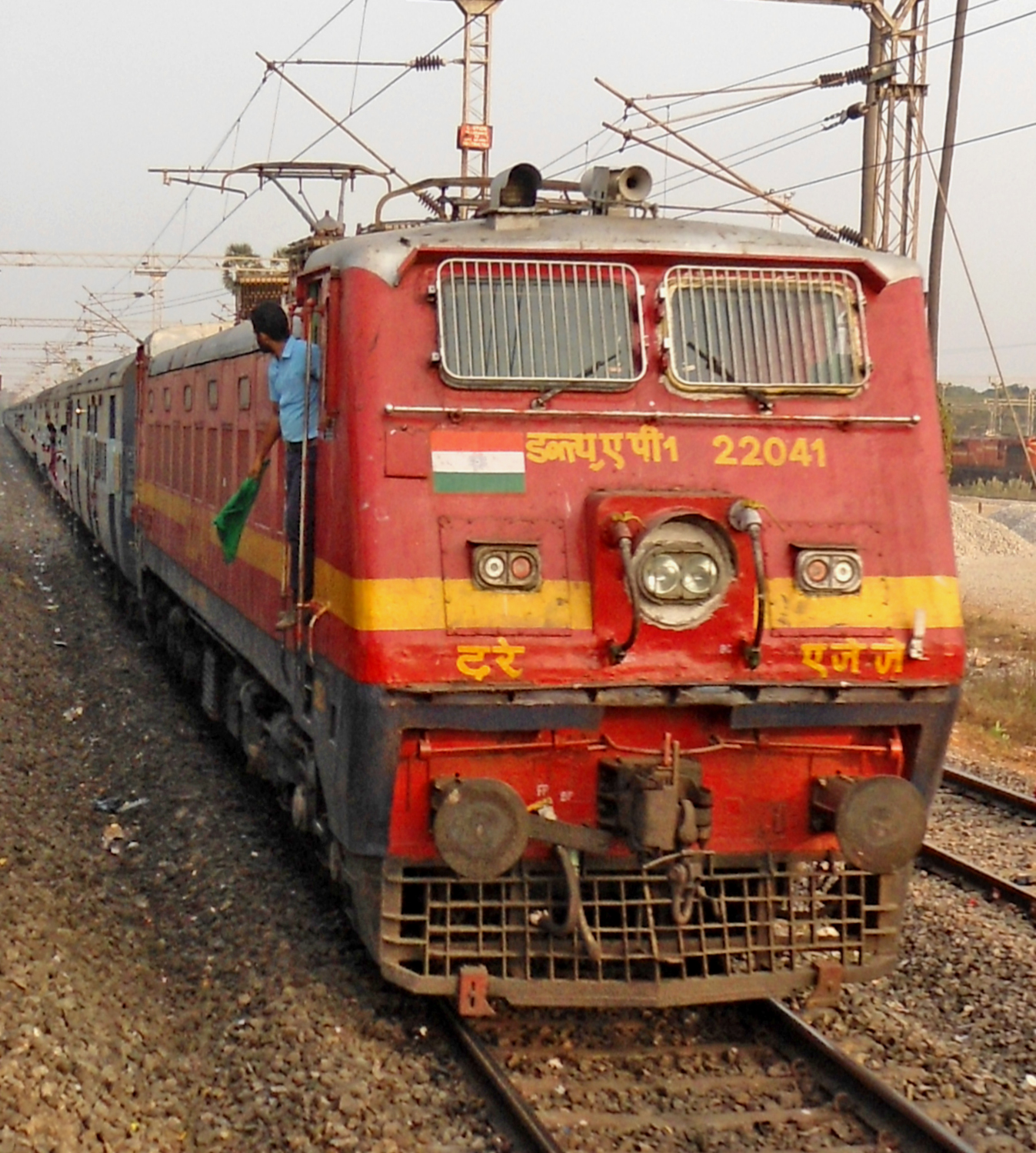
Thiruvananthapuram Central-bound Guwahati Express spotted at Marripalem, Andhra Pradesh in 2016

Badarpur Jn, Lumding Jn, Guwahati, New Bongaigaon Jn, New Cooch Behar, New Jalpaiguri Jn, Malda Town, Rampurhat Jn, Kharagpur Jn, Dankuni Jn, Cuttack Jn, Bhubaneswar, Visakhapatnam Jn, Vijayawada Jn, Katpadi Jn, Coimbatore Jn, Palakkad Jn, Ernakulam Town, Kottayam, Tiruvalla, Chengannur, Kollam Jn.

== See also ==
- Bangalore Cantonment–Agartala Humsafar Express
- Dibrugarh–Tambaram Express
- Kamakhya–SMVT Bengaluru AC Superfast Express
- Kaziranga Superfast Express
- MGR Chennai Central – New Jalpaiguri Superfast Express
- New Tinsukia–Bengaluru Weekly Express
- Longest train services of Indian Railways
