= List of railway stations in Tripura =

The railway network in Tripura belongs to Lumding Division of Northeast Frontier Railway zone operated by Indian Railways.

The first railway line in the state was laid from Kalkalighat to Dharmanagar in 1964. The railway was extended from Dharmanagar to Kumarghat in the year 1990. It was again extended from Kumarghat to Agartala in 2008.

| Sl No | Station Name | Station Code | District | Railway Zone |
|---|---|---|---|---|
| 1 | Agartala | AGTL | West Tripura | NEFR |
| 2 | Ambassa | ABSA | Dhalai | NEFR |
| 3 | Belonia | BENA | South Tripura | NEFR |
| 4 | Bishalgarh | BLGH | Sepahijala district | NEFR |
| 5 | Bishramganj | BHRM | Sepahijala district | NEFR |
| 6 | Churaibari | CBZ | North Tripura | NEFR |
| 7 | Dharmanagar | DMR | North Tripura | NEFR |
| 8 | Garjee | JRJE | Gomati district | NEFR |
| 9 | Jawaharnagar | JWNR | Dhalai district | NEFR |
| 10 | Jirania | JRNA | West Tripura | NEFR |
| 11 | Jogendranagar | JGNR | West Tripura | NEFR |
| 12 | Jolaibari | JIBI | South Tripura | NEFR |
| 13 | Kumarghat | KUGT | Unakoti district | NEFR |
| 14 | Manu | MANU | Dhalai district | NEFR |
| 15 | Manu Bazar | MUBR | South Tripura | NEFR |
| 16 | Mungiakami | MGKM | Khowai district | NEFR |
| 17 | Nadiapur | NPU | North Tripura | NEFR |
| 18 | Nalkata | NLKT | Dhalai district | NEFR |
| 19 | Panisagar | PASG | North Tripura | NEFR |
| 20 | Pencharthal | PEC | Unakoti district | NEFR |
| 21 | Sabroom | SBRM | South Tripura | NEFR |
| 22 | Santir Bazar | STRB | South Tripura | NEFR |
| 23 | Sekerkote | SKKE | West Tripura | NEFR |
| 24 | Sk Para | SKAP | Dhalai district | NEFR |
| 25 | Teliamura | TLMR | Khowai district | NEFR |
| 26 | Thailik Twisa | THTW | South Tripura | NEFR |
| 27 | Udaipur | UDPU | Gomati district | NEFR |

== See also ==
- North Eastern Railway Connectivity Project
