= Garjee railway station =

Railway station in Tripura, India

Garjee Railway Station

General information
- Location: Garjee, South Tripura district, Tripura; India
- Coordinates: 23.431723°N 91.4963183°E
- Elevation: 34 metres (112 ft)
- System: Indian Railways station
- Owner: Indian Railways
- Operator: North Western Railway
- Line: Lumding–Sabroom section
- Platforms: 2
- Tracks: 3

Construction
- Structure type: Standard (on-ground station)
- Platform levels: At Ground
- Parking: Yes
- Cycle facilities: No

Other information
- Status: Operational
- Station code: JRJE
- Zone(s): Northeast Frontier Railway
- Division(s): Lumding

History
- Opened: 2019

Services
Preceding station	Indian Railways	Following station
Udaipur Tripura towards ?	Northeast Frontier Railway zone Lumding–Sabroom section	Santir Bazar towards ?
Location
- Location within Tripura

Garjee railway station is a railway station in Gomati district, Tripura. Its code is JRJE. It serves Garjee village. The station lies on the Agartala–Sabroom rail section, which comes under the Lumding railway division of the Northeast Frontier Railway. The segment from Garjee to Sabroom became operational on 3 October 2019.

== Station layout ==
G	Street level	Exit/Entrance & ticket counter
P1	FOB, Side platform, No-1 doors will open on the left/right
P1	Track 1
P1	Track 2	toward →
P1	Track 3	toward →
P1	FOB, Island platform, No- 2 doors will open on the left/right
P1	Island platform, No- 3 doors will open on the left/right
Track 4	Under Construction

== Major trains ==
07682/07684/07690 Agartala-Garjee-Sabroom 07689/07683/07681 Sabroom-Garjee-Agartala

== See also ==
- Udaipur, Tripura
- Indian Railways
- Agartala railway station
- Lumding–Sabroom section
- Sabroom railway station
- List of railway stations in India
