= Sabroom railway station =

Railway station in Tripura, India

Sabroom
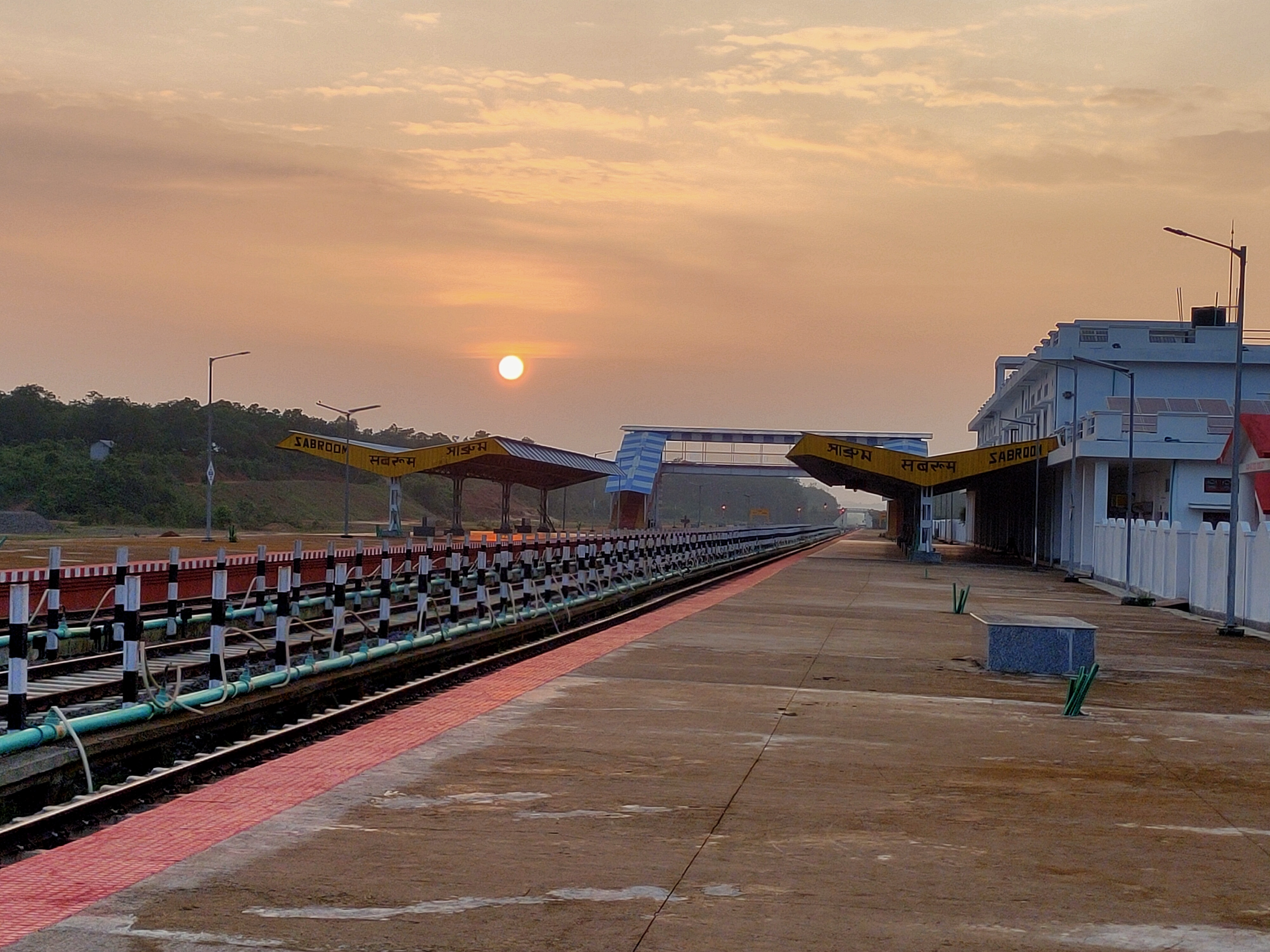
- Sabroom railway station platform.

General information
- Location: NH 8, Sabroom, South Tripura district, Tripura; India
- Coordinates: 23.014062°N 91.6987492°E
- Elevation: 33 metres (108 ft)
- System: Indian Railways station
- Owner: Indian Railways
- Operator: Northeast Frontier Railway
- Line: Lumding–Sabroom section
- Platforms: 3
- Tracks: 4

Construction
- Structure type: Standard (on-ground station)
- Platform levels: At ground
- Parking: No
- Cycle facilities: No

Other information
- Status: Single diesel line
- Station code: SBRM
- Zone(s): Northeast Frontier Railway
- Division(s): Lumding

History
- Opened: 2019
- Electrified: Ongoing

Services
Preceding station	Indian Railways	Following station
Manu Bazar towards ?	Northeast Frontier Railway zone Silchar–Sabroom section	Terminus
Location
- Location within Tripura Location within India

Sabroom railway station (Station code:- SBRM), is a railway station which serves Sabroom town in South Tripura district of Tripura state of India. It is located near Feni River which serves as Bangladesh–India border.

== History ==
The Sabroom railway station is the terminus railhead of the 113 km long 1,676 mm (5 ft 6 in) broad-gauge Agartala–Sabroom railway line which comes under the Lumding railway division of the Northeast Frontier Railway zone of Indian Railways. It is a single line without electrification. On 3 October 2019, the first DEMU serving Agartala–Sabroom performed its inaugural run after the construction of railway line was completed. In 2016, 43 km long segment from Agartala to Udaipur near Mata Tripura Sundari temple was completed. On 3 October 2019, the remaining Udaipur-Sabroom segment was also completed.

== Station layout ==
G	Street level	Exit/Entrance & ticket counter
P1	FOB, Side platform, No-1 doors will open on the left/right
P1	Track 1
P1	Track 2	toward →
P1	Track 3	toward →
P1	FOB, Island platform, No- 2 doors will open on the left/right
P1	Island platform, No- 3 doors will open on the left/right
Track 4	Under Construction

== Future connectivity ==
The rail link from South Tripura district will be extended to Chittagong Port and Cox's Bazar deep water port in Bangladesh, as agreed by the prime ministers of the both countries, by rehabilitating the railway link from Santir Bazar railway station in India to Feni Junction railway station in Bangladesh. Maitri Setu bridge near Sabroom was opened in 2021 to connect the "Belonia, India–Parshuram, Bangladesh road and rail crossing checkposts". Compared to the 1,880 km (1,170 mi) long, congested "Chicken's Neck" Siliguri Corridor, this will provide a shorter and more affordable route, and it will also provide the alternative strategic redundancy to Kaladan Multi-Modal project route if there is a war with China.

== Trains ==
The following trains are available from this railway station:

- Sealdah–Sabroom Kanchanjunga Express
- Sabroom Agartala DEMU

== See also ==
- Udaipur, Tripura
- Indian Railways
- Agartala railway station
- Lumding–Sabroom section
- Tripura#Transport
- Silchar–Sabroom section
- List of railway stations in India
