= Santirbazar =

- Municipality
- Location within Tripura Location within India
- Coordinates: 23.30°N 91.55°E
- Country: India
- State: Tripura
- District: South Tripura

Government
  - Type: Municipal Council
  - Body: Santir Bazar Municipal Council
  - Chairperson: Smt. Swapna Majumdar Baidya (BJP)

Population (2011)
  - Total: 15,647

Languages
  - Official: Bengali; Kokborok; English
- Time zone: UTC+5:30 (IST)
- Postal code: 799144
- Telephone code: 03823
- Vehicle registration: TR
- Website: tripura.gov.in

Santirbazar is a town and Municipal Council in South Tripura district, Tripura, India located 84 kms away from state capital Agartala. It is linked with Agartala (the state capital) by National Highway 8 via Udaipur and Bishramganj to Sabroom.

== Geography ==
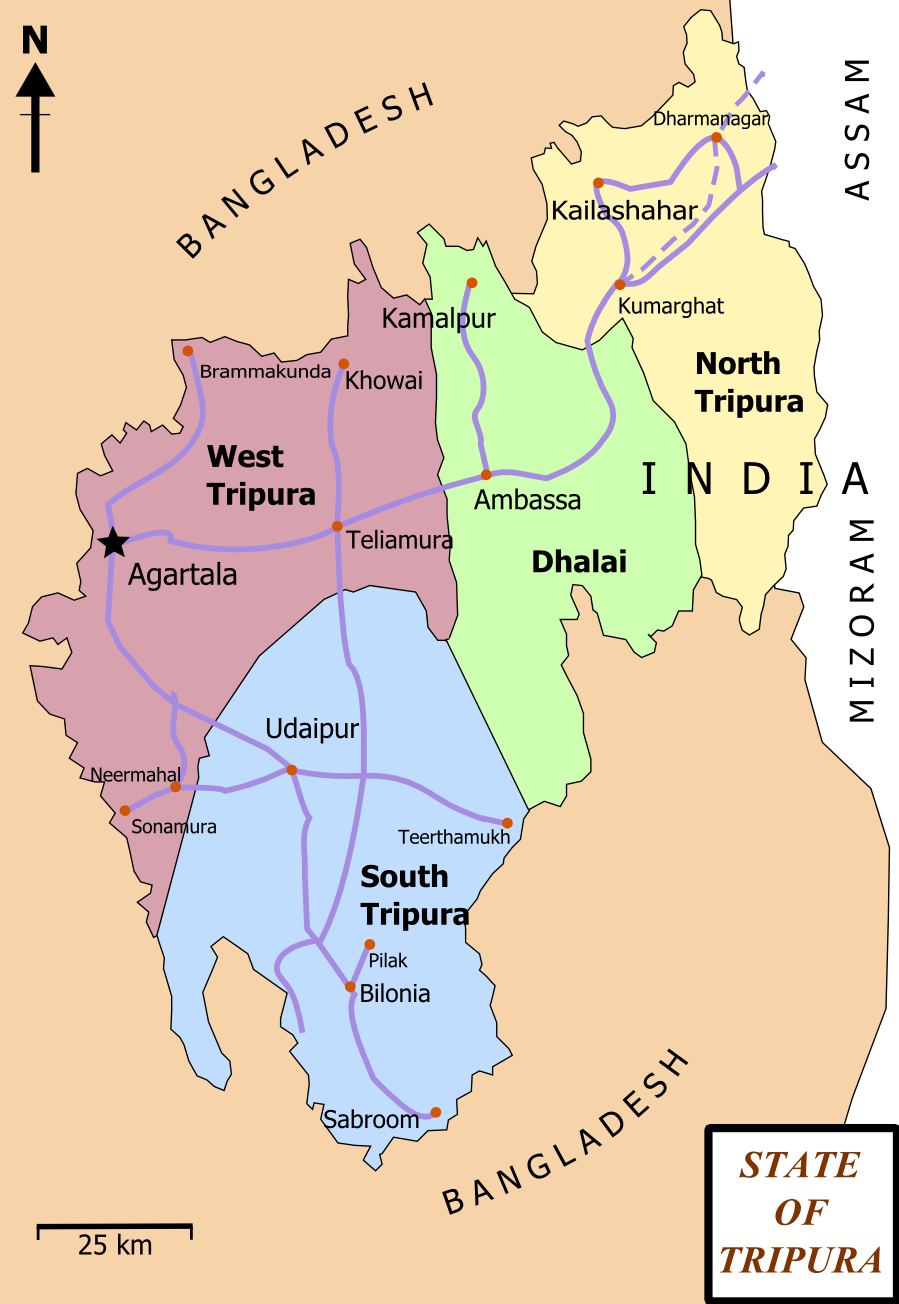
State of Tripura has eight districts, roadways, and a small railway network

Santirbazar isat 23.30°N 91.55°E. It has an average elevation of 30 metres (98 feet).

== Demographics ==
As of 2011 India census, Santirbazar town has population of 11921, male population is 6100 and female population is 5821. Population of Children under the age of 0-6 is 1209, male child population under the age of six is 612 and female child population under the age of six is 597. Presently the population of Santirbazar Municipal council is 15,647.

Males constitute 51% of the population and females 49%. Female Sex Ratio is 954 per 1000 male persons. Child sex ratio is 975 per 1000 male child under the age of six. Total number of house hold in Santirbazar is 3254.

Santirbazar has a literacy rate of 91.8%, higher than state average of 87.22% and national average of 77.7%, with Male literacy is around 95.43% while female literacy rate is 88.00%.

Population Density of Santirbazar is 627 person per hectare .

=== Racial and Caste based Orientation ===
Total House holds under Santirbazar Municipal council is 3529 nos. Out of total population 15,647, General contribute 4,953 to the population (31.6%), Scheduled Castes are 5,814 (37.1%), Scheduled Tribe are1005 (6.3%), OBC are 3,764 (24.5), Other minorities constitute 111(<1%).

=== Religion ===
In Santirbazar Hinduism is religion followed by majority making 94.83% of the total population. The other religion followed by people here include Islam, Christianity, Sikhism etc.

==== Religion wise population distribution of Santirbazar ====
- Hindu - 94.83%
- Muslim - 0.55%
- Christian - 0.14%
- Sikh - 0.03%
- Buddhist - 3.89%
- Jain - 0.03%
- Other religions and persuasions - 0.24%
- Religion not stated - 0.29%

=== Work Profile ===
As of 2011 census, Total working population of Santirbazar is 4461 which are either main or marginal workers. Total workers in the town/city are 4461 out of which 3692 are male and 769 are female. Total main workers are 3587 out of which male main workers are 3156 and female main workers are 431. Total marginal workers of Santirbazar are 874.

Of total working population, 80.41% were engaged in Main Work while 19.59% of total workers were engaged in Marginal Work.

== Education ==
Schools:

- Santir bazar H/S School
- Santir bazar Girls H/S School
- Bokafa Ashram H/S School
- Kendriya Vidyalaya, Bagafa
- Sunflower English Medium Academy
- Betaga H/S School
- West Bokafa H/S School

Colleges:

- Government Degree College, Santirbazar

== Places of interest ==
- Pilak-Pathar, 12th century Hindu-Buddhist archaeological site preserved by ASI, about 12 kilometres (7.5 mi) away
- Trishna Wildlife Sanctuary
- Jogmaya Temple, Kalibari
- Indo-Bangla Custom Checkpost
- Raj Rajeswari Temple, Muhuripur
- Muhurichar river island
- Muhuripur Fishery near Bamchara
- Mahamuni Temple, Mohamuni Road
- Buddhist Temple (Kalashi)

== Santir Bazar railway station ==
A railway station was constructed in Santirbazar (code: SNTBR) which serves the town. The station lies on the Agartala - Sabroom rail section, which comes under the Lumding railway division of the Northeast Frontier Railway. The segment from Agartala to Sabroom via Udaipur became operational on 3 October 2019, with a proposed elevation of 39m.

== Santirbazar integrated checkpost ==
Santir bazar integrated check post on the India-Bangladesh border on Santir bazar-Feni rail and road route is in Mizoram in India. It was officially opened in October 2017 by Prime Minister Narendra Modi.

== Politics ==
Santirbazar is 36th assembly constituency among the 60 constituency of Tripura state Legislative assembly. Currently Shri Pramod Reang from Bharatiya Janata Partyis elected MLA from Santirbazar constituency.

Belonia assembly constituency is in the Tripura West Lok Sabha constituency.

== See also ==
- List of cities and towns in Tripura
- Amarpur
- Teliamura
- Khumulwng
- Kailashahar
- Chittamara, Belonia
