= Bishalgarh railway station =

Railway station in Tripura, India

Bishalgarh

General information
- Location: Bishalgarh, Sepahijala district, Tripura; India
- Coordinates: 23.6767°N 91.2731°E
- Elevation: 17 metres (56 ft)
- System: Indian Railways station
- Owner: Indian Railways
- Operator: North Western Railway
- Line: Lumding–Sabroom section
- Platforms: 1
- Tracks: 3

Construction
- Structure type: Standard (on-ground station)
- Parking: No
- Cycle facilities: No

Other information
- Status: Single diesel line
- Station code: BLGH
- Zone(s): Northeast Frontier Railway
- Division(s): Lumding

History
- Opened: 2017

Services
Preceding station	Indian Railways	Following station
Sekerkote towards ?	Northeast Frontier Railway zone Lumding–Sabroom section	Bishramganj towards ?
Location

Bishalgarh Railway Station is a railway station in Sepahijala district, Tripura, India. Its code is BLGH. It serves Bishalgarh town. The station lies on the Lumding–Sabroom section, which comes under the Lumding railway division of the Northeast Frontier Railway. The segment from Agartala to Sabroom via Udaipur became operational on 3 October 2019.

== Major trains ==
- 55683/55684 Garjee–Agartala Passenger

== See also ==
- North Eastern Railway Connectivity Project
