= Bishramganj railway station =

Railway station in Tripura, India

Bishramganj

General information
- Location: Laltila, Sipahijala district, Tripura; India
- Coordinates: 23.5983°N 91.3606°E
- Elevation: 42 metres (138 ft)
- System: Indian Railways station
- Owner: Indian Railways
- Operator: North Western Railway
- Line: Lumding–Sabroom section
- Platforms: 2
- Tracks: 3

Construction
- Structure type: Standard (on-ground station)
- Parking: No
- Cycle facilities: No

Other information
- Status: Single diesel line
- Station code: BHRM
- Zone(s): Northeast Frontier Railway
- Division(s): Lumding

History
- Opened: 2017

Services
Preceding station	Indian Railways	Following station
Bishalgarh towards ?	Northeast Frontier Railway zone Lumding–Sabroom section	Udaipur towards ?
Location

Bishramganj Railway Station is a railway station in Sipahijala district, Tripura. Its code is BHRM. It serves Bishramganj town. The station lies on the Lumding–Sabroom section, which comes under the Lumding railway division of the Northeast Frontier Railway. The segment from Agartala to Sabroom via Udaipur became operational on 3 October 2019.

== Major trains ==
- 55683/55684 Garjee–Agartala Passenger
