= Manu Bazar railway station =

Railway station in Tripura, India

Manu Bazar

General information
- Location: Manu Bazar, South Tripura district, Tripura; India
- Coordinates: 23.0618928°N 91.6461052°E
- Elevation: 33 metres (108 ft)
- System: Indian Railways station
- Owner: Indian Railways
- Operator: North Western Railway
- Line: Lumding–Sabroom section
- Platforms: 3
- Tracks: 4

Construction
- Structure type: Standard (on-ground station)
- Platform levels: At ground
- Parking: Yes
- Cycle facilities: No

Other information
- Status: Single diesel line
- Station code: MUBR
- Zone(s): Northeast Frontier Railway
- Division(s): Lumding

History
- Opened: 2019

Services
Preceding station	Indian Railways	Following station
Thailik Twisa towards ?	Northeast Frontier Railway zone Lumding–Sabroom section	Sabroom towards ?
Location
- Location within Tripura

Manu Bazar railway station is a railway station in Manu Bazar, South Tripura district, Tripura, India. Its code is MUBR. It serves Manu Bazar village. The station lies on the Agartala – Sabroom rail section, which comes under the Lumding railway division of the Northeast Frontier Railway. The segment from Agartala to Sabroom via Udaipur became operational on 3 October 2019.

== Station layout ==
G	Street level	Exit/Entrance & ticket counter
P1	FOB, Side platform, No-1 doors will open on the left/right
P1	Track 1
P1	Track 2	toward →
P1	Track 3	toward →
P1	FOB, Island platform, No- 2 doors will open on the left/right
P1	Island platform, No- 3 doors will open on the left/right
Track 4	Under Construction

== See also ==
- Udaipur, Tripura
- Indian Railways
- Agartala railway station
- Lumding–Sabroom section
- Sabroom railway station
- List of railway stations in India
