= Jolaibari railway station =

Railway station in Tripura, India

Jolaibari

General information
- Location: Jolaibari, South Tripura district, Tripura; India
- Coordinates: 23.1908°N 91.5964°E
- Elevation: 44 metres (144 ft)
- System: Indian Railways station
- Owner: Indian Railways
- Operator: North Western Railway
- Line: Agartala–Sabroom line
- Platforms: 1
- Tracks: 3

Construction
- Structure type: Standard (on-ground station)
- Parking: No
- Cycle facilities: No

Other information
- Status: Single diesel line
- Station code: JLBRI
- Zone(s): Northeast Frontier Railway
- Division(s): Lumding

History
- Opened: 2019
- Electrified: Ongoing

Services
| Preceding station | Indian Railways | Following station |
|---|---|---|
| Belonia towards ? | Northeast Frontier Railway zone Agartala–Sabroom line | Thailik Twisa towards ? |
Location

Jolaibari railway station is a railway station in South Tripura district, Tripura. Its code is JLBRI. It serves Jolaibari village. The station lies on the Agartala–Sabroom rail section, which comes under the Lumding railway division of the Northeast Frontier Railway. The segment from Agartala to Sabroom via Udaipur became operational on 3 October 2019.
