= Udaipur railway station =

Railway station in Gomati district, Tripura, India

Udaipur
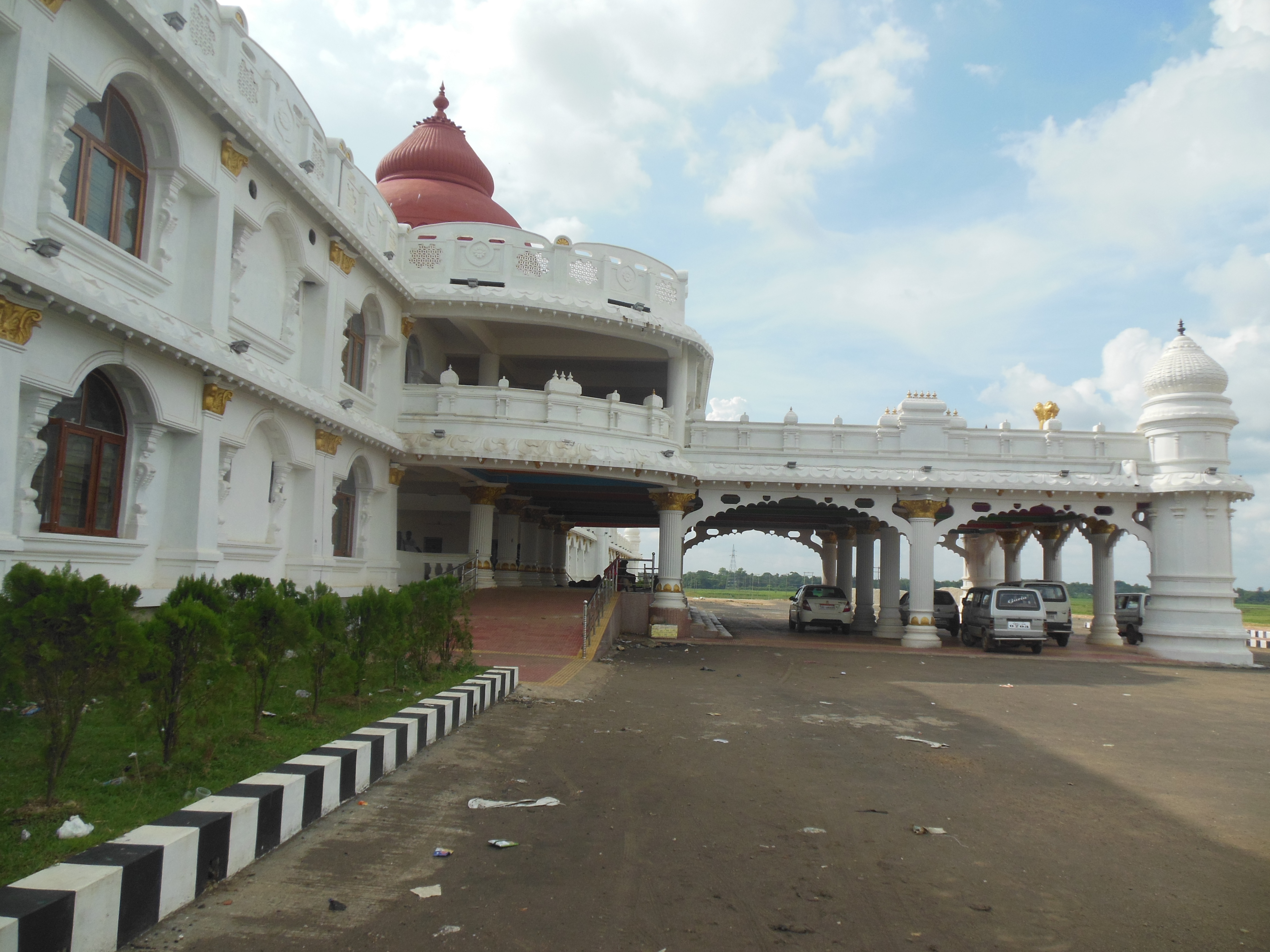

General information
- Location: Khilpara, Gomati district, Tripura; India
- Coordinates: 23.5097701°N 91.4794689°E
- Elevation: 19 metres (62 ft)
- System: Indian Railways station
- Owner: Indian Railways
- Operator: Northeast Frontier Railway
- Line: Lumding–Sabroom section
- Platforms: 3
- Tracks: 4
- Connections: Agartala, Sabroom

Construction
- Structure type: Standard (on-ground station)
- Platform levels: At ground
- Parking: No
- Cycle facilities: No

Other information
- Status: Single diesel line
- Station code: UDPU
- Zone(s): Northeast Frontier Railway
- Division(s): Lumding

History
- Opened: 2017
- Electrified: Ongoing

Services
Preceding station	Indian Railways	Following station
Bishramganj towards ?	Northeast Frontier Railway zone Lumding–Sabroom section	Garjee towards ?
Route map
Location
- Location within India

Udaipur railway station is a railway station in Gomati district, Tripura. Its code is UDPU. It serves Udaipur, Tripura, city. The station lies on the Lumding–Sabroom section, which comes under the Lumding railway division of the Northeast Frontier Railway. The segment from Agartala to Sabroom via Udaipur became operational on 3 October 2019.

== Station layout ==
G	Street level	Exit/Entrance & ticket counter
P1	FOB, Side platform, No-1 doors will open on the left/right
P1	Track 1
P1	Track 2	toward →
P1	Track 3	toward →
P1	FOB, Island platform, No- 2 doors will open on the left/right
P1	Island platform, No- 3 doors will open on the left/right
Track 4	toward →

== Major trains ==
- 13173/13174 Sealdah–Sabroom Kanchanjunga Express
- 55683/55684 Garjee–Agartala Passenger

== See also ==
- Udaipur, Tripura
- Indian Railways
- Agartala railway station
- Lumding–Sabroom section
- Sabroom railway station
- List of railway stations in India
