= Santir Bazar railway station =

Railway station in Tripura, India

Santir Bazar

General information
- Location: Gardang, South Tripura district, Tripura; India
- Coordinates: 23.3220°N 91.5323°E
- Elevation: 44 metres (144 ft)
- System: Indian Railways station
- Owner: Indian Railways
- Operator: Northeast Frontier Railway
- Line: Agartala–Sabroom line
- Platforms: 1
- Tracks: 3

Construction
- Structure type: Standard (on-ground station)
- Parking: No
- Cycle facilities: No

Other information
- Status: Single diesel line
- Station code: SNTBR
- Zone(s): Northeast Frontier Railway
- Division(s): Lumding

History
- Opened: 2019

Services
Preceding station	Indian Railways	Following station
Garjee towards ?	Northeast Frontier Railway zone Agartala–Sabroom line	Belonia towards ?
Location

Santirbazar railway station is a railway station in Santirbazar, South Tripura District, Tripura, India.Santir Bazar railway station is a railway station in Santirbazar, South Tripura district, Tripura, India.

Its code is SNTBR. It serves Santirbazar town which is about 3 km east of the station. The station lies on the Agartala–Sabroom rail section, which comes under the Lumding railway division of the Northeast Frontier Railway. The segment from Agartala to Sabroom via Udaipur became operational on 3 October 2019.
