= Sekerkote railway station =

Railway station in Tripura, India

Sekerkote

General information
- Location: Bikramnagar, West Tripura district, Tripura; India
- Coordinates: 23.7437°N 91.2774°E
- Elevation: 28 metres (92 ft)
- System: Indian Railways station
- Owner: Indian Railways
- Operator: North Western Railway
- Line: Lumding–Sabroom section
- Platforms: 1
- Tracks: 3

Construction
- Structure type: Standard (on-ground station)
- Parking: No
- Cycle facilities: No

Other information
- Status: Single diesel line
- Station code: SKKE
- Zone(s): Northeast Frontier Railway
- Division(s): Lumding

History
- Opened: 2017

Services
Preceding station	Indian Railways	Following station
Agartala towards ?	Northeast Frontier Railway zone Lumding–Sabroom section	Bishalgarh (toward Sabroom) towards ?
Location

Sekerkote Railway Station is a railway station in West Tripura district, Tripura. Its code is SKKE. It serves Sekerkote village. The station lies on the Lumding–Sabroom section, which comes under the Lumding railway division of the Northeast Frontier Railway. The segment from Agartala to Sabroom via Udaipur became operational on 3 October 2019.

== Major trains ==
- 55683/55684 Garjee–Agartala Passenger
