= Sipahijala district =

Coordinates: 23.6327°N 91.3198°E

- District of Tripura
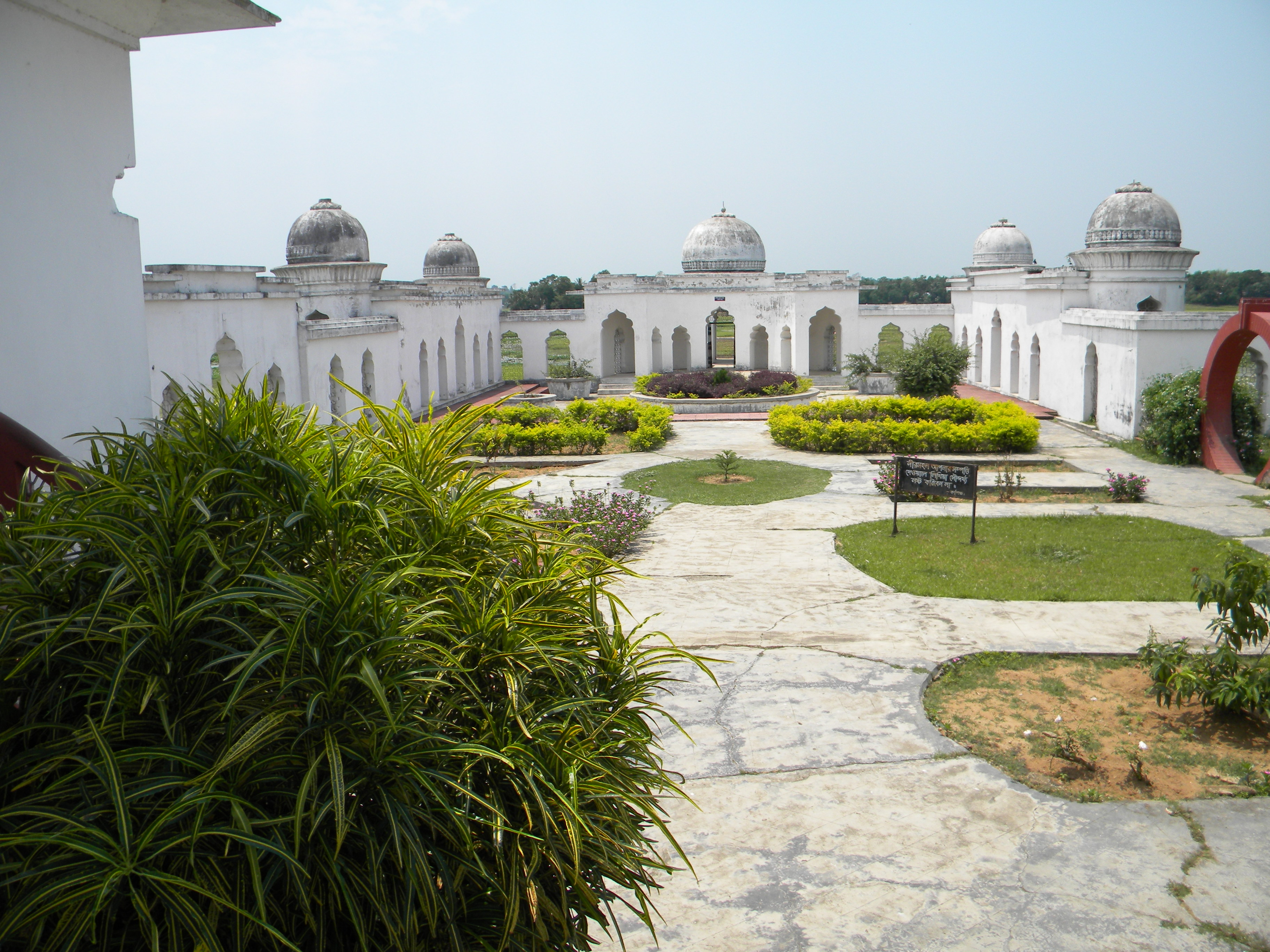
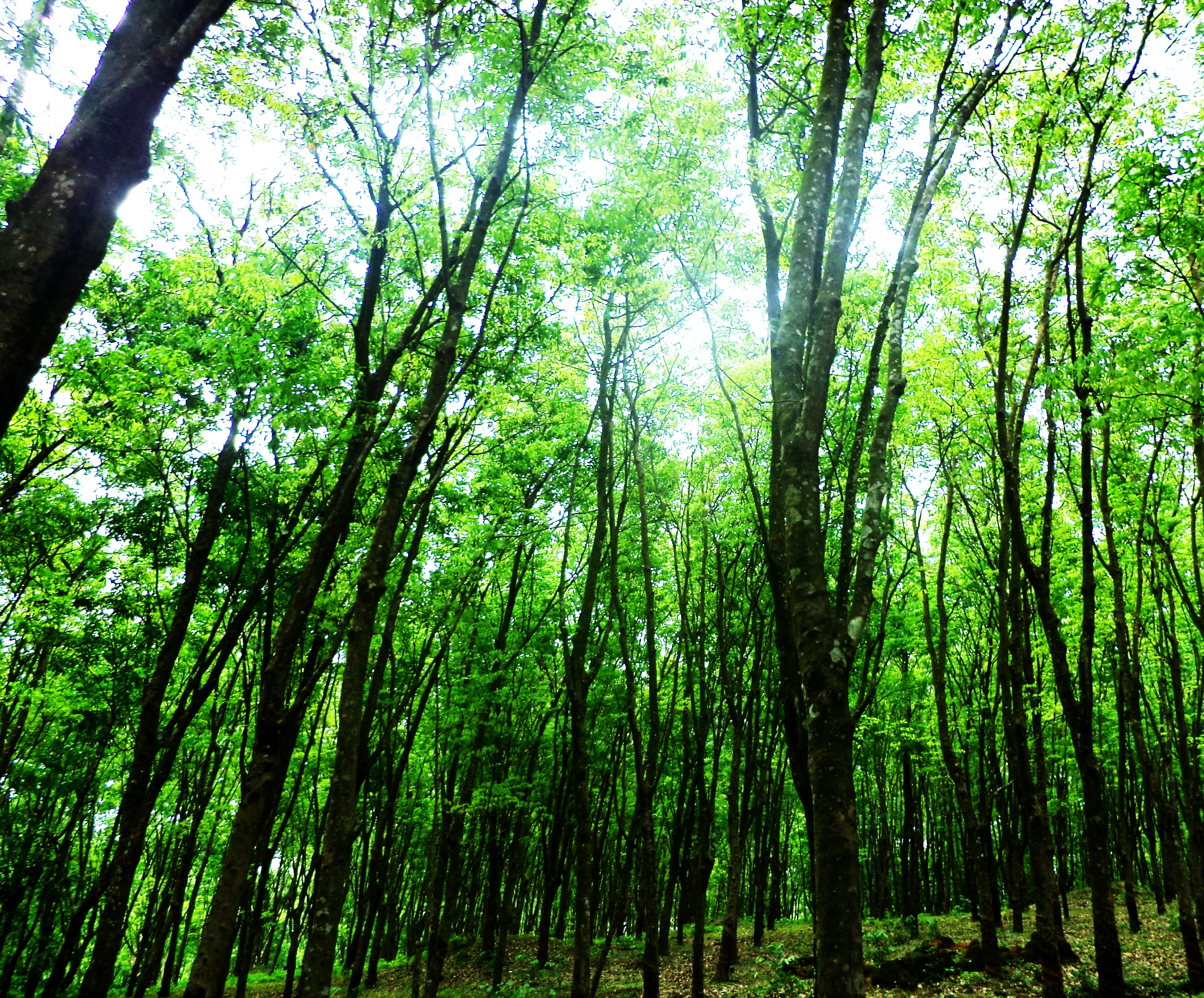
- Top: Neermahal; Bottom: Trees at Sepahijala Wildlife Sanctuary
- Sepahijala district Location in Tripura
- Country: India
- State: Tripura
- Established: January 2012
- Headquarters: Bishramganj

Government
  - DM & Collector: Siddharth Shiv Jaiswal, IAS

Area
  - Total: 1,043.04 km^{2} (402.72 sq mi)

Population (2011)
  - Total: 479,975
  - Density: 460.169/km^{2} (1,191.83/sq mi)

Demographics
  - Literacy: 98%
  - Sex ratio: 966 F/1000 M
- Time zone: UTC+05:30 (IST)
- Vehicle registration: TR-07
- Website: sepahijala.nic.in

Sipahijala district is a district of Tripura, India. This district was created in January 2012 when four new districts were established in Tripura, taking the number of districts in the state from four to eight. Part of the district was formed from the former district of West Tripura. The principal towns in the district are Bishalgarh, Bishramganj, Melaghar and Sonamura.

== Division ==
There are 3 Sub-Division in Sipahijala district. They are Bishalgarh subdivision, Sonamura Sub-division and Jampuijala subdivision.

There are 7 Blocks under Sepahijala District. They are Bishalgarh, Charilam, Nalchar (formerly Melaghar), Mohanbhog, Boxanagar, Kathalia and Jampuijala

== Demographics ==
According to the 2011 census, Sipahijala district had a population of 479,975. Sepahijala has a sex ratio of 955 females to 1000 males and a literacy rate of 84.78%. 10.28% of the population lives in urban areas. Scheduled Castes and Scheduled Tribes make up 82,557 (17.20%) and 115,811 (24.13%) of the population respectively.

Religions in Sepahijala district (2011)
Religion	Percent
Hindus	72.77%
Muslims	24.59%
Christians	2.37%
Other or not stated	0.27%
Distribution of religions

Sepahijala had 349,260 Hindus, 118,038 Muslims and 11,399 Christians.

Block	Hindu	Muslim	Other
Bishalgarh	137,728	25,732	2,793
Boxanagar	23,705	27,828	174
Kathalia	37,044	25,031	414
Jampuijala	35,678	1,211	8,793
Melagar	90,109	30,946	419

Languages of Sipahijala district (2011)
1. Bengali (73.3%)
2. Kokborok (23.3%)
3. Others (3.42%)

At the time of the 2011 census, 73.26% of the population spoke Bengali and 23.32% Kokborok as their first language.

== Transport ==
=== Roadway ===
National Highway 8 (NH 8), running from Karimganj in Assam to Sabroom in Tripura, passes through this district.

=== Railway ===
Lumding–Sabroom line of Northeast Frontier Railway passes through Sipahijala district. There are two stations in the district, namely Bishramganj railway station and Bishalgarh railway station, providing connectivity to Tripura capital Agartala and Assam and other major cities of the state like Dharmanagar, Udaipur and Belonia.

== Places to visit ==
There are some major tourist spots in Sepahijala District which are namely:-

1. Neermahal (Twijilikma Nuyung)
2. Sepahijala Wildlife Sanctuary
3. Kamalasagar and Kamalasagar(Kashaba) Kali Temple
4. Baxanagar Buddhist Stupa.
