= List of districts of Tripura =

The districts of Tripura

The Indian state of Tripura borders with Bangladesh and the Indian states of Assam and Mizoram. The third-smallest state in India and also a princely state till 1949, it covers an area of 10,491 square kilometres (4,051 sq mi). The area of modern Tripura was ruled for several centuries by the Manikya dynasty of the Twipra kingdom. It was a princely state during British rule, and joined the newly independent India. Ethnic strife between the indigenous Tripuri people and refugees, illegal immigrants influx of Bengali population led to tension and scattered violence since its integration into the country, but the establishment of an autonomous tribal administrative agency and other strategies have led to peace for a short period. Tripura was divided into four districts but with effect from 21 January 2012 four more new districts was divided making a total of eight districts in the state.

For administrative purposes, the state has been divided into 8 districts, 23 subdivisions and 58 development blocks—with effect from 21 January 2012, after a Government of Tripura Decision, out of which the newly created districts are 4, subdivisions 6, development blocks 5. The four new Districts are Gomati, Khowai, Sepahijala and Unakoti; the six new sub-divisions are Jirania, Mohanpur, Kumarghat, Panisagar, Jampuijala and Karbook; the five new development blocks are Yuvarajnagar, Durga Chowmuhani, Jolaibari, Silachari and Lefunga.

The information here are latest updated as of 25 May 2015.

== History ==
Dating back to the time of Mahabharata, the very helm of the Kingdom of Tripura encompassed the greater part of Eastern Bengal stretching from the Bay of Bengal in the South to the Brahmaputra in the North and west and Burma, now Myanmar in the East. The earliest trace of the ancient of Tripura can be found in the Ashokan pillar inscriptions. The 17th century is a major watershed in the history of Tripura when the administration of the region passed on the hands of the Mughals with some powers left with the Manikyas. In the Colonial era, the Britishers extended their control over Tripura granting some limited independence to the Manikya kings. The region was under the rule of the Twipra Kingdom for centuries, although when this dates from is not documented. The Rajmala, a chronicle of Tripuri kings which was first written in the 15th century, provides a list of 179 kings, from antiquity up to Krishna Kishore Manikya (1830–1850), but the reliability of the Rajmala has been doubted. The Royal history of Tripura ended when the princely state acceded to the Indian Union on 15 October 1949. After death of the last king Maharaja Bir Bikram Kishore Manikya on 17 May 1947, a Regency Council was formed headed by Maharani Kanchan Prabha Devi, for aid of the minor Prince, Kirit Bikram Kishore Manikya Bahadur. The regent signed the merger agreement with the Government of India. After merger Tripura became a Part ‘C’ State. On reorganization of the states, effected in November, 1956, Tripura became a Union Territory with an Advisory Committee to aid and advise the Chief Commissioner. Thereafter in place of the Advisory Committee, a Territorial Council was formed through the adult franchise on 15 August 1957. On 1 July 1963, the Tripura Territorial Council was dissolved and the Legislative Assembly with the existing members of the Territorial Council was formed. On 21 January 1972 Tripura became full-fledged State by the Act of Parliament called the North Eastern Areas (Reorganization) Act, 1971.

=== Former administrative districts ===
Code	District	Headquarters	Population (2011)	Area (km²)	Density (/km²)	Official website
DH	Dhalai	Ambassa	377,988	2,523	157	http://dhalai.gov.in/
NT	North Tripura	Kailashahar	693,281	2,821	341	http://northtripura.nic.in/
ST	South Tripura	Udaipur	875,144	2,152	286	http://southtripura.nic.in/
WT	West Tripura	Agartala	1,724,619	2,997	576	http://westtripura.nic.in/

== List of Districts ==
Sl No	District	Headquarters	District Magistrate	Police Superintendent	Subdivisions	Development Blocks	Municipals	Population (2011)	Area (in km^{2})	Map
1	Dhalai	Ambassa	Saju Vaheed A, IAS	Kishore Debbarma, TPS Gr-1	1. Kamalpur; 2. Ambassa; 3. Longtarai Valley; 4. Gandachera	1. a) Salema; 1. b) Durga Chawmuhani; 2. a) Ambassa; 3. a) Manu; 3. b) Chawmanu; 4. a) Dumburnagar; 4. b) Raishyabari	1. a) Kamalpur Nagar Panchayet; 2. a) Ambassa Municipal Council	378,000	2426	
2	Gomati	Udaipur	Tarit Kanti Chakma, IAS	Lucky Chauhan, IPS	1. Udaipur; 2. Amarpur; 3. Karbook	1. a) Matabari; 1. b) Kakraban; 1. c) Killa; 2. a) Amarpur; 2. b) Ompi; 3. a) Karbook; 3. b) Silachari	1. a) Udaipur Municipal Council; 2. a) Amarpur Nagar Panchayet	441,538	1,522.8	
3	Khowai	Khowai	Rajat Pant, IAS	Ramesh Kumar Yadav, IPS	1. Khowai; 2. Teliamura	1. a) Khowai; 1. b) Tulashikhar; 1. c) Padmabil; 2. a) Teliamura; 2. b) Kalyanpur; 2. c) Mungiakami	1. a) Khowai Municipal Council; 2. a) Teliamura Municipal Council	327,564	1,377.28	
4	Sepahijala	Bishramganj	Siddharth Shiv Jaiswal, IAS	Krishnendu Chakraborty, IPS	1. Bishalgarh; 2. Sonamura; 3. Jampuijala	1. a) Bishalgarh; 1. b) Charilam; 2. a) Mohanbhog; 2. b) Kathalia; 2. c) Boxanagar; 2. d) Nalchar; 3. a) Jampuijala	1. a) Bishalgarh Municipal Council; 2. a) Sonamura Nagar Panchayet; 2. b) Melaghar Municipal Council	479,975	1,043.04	
5	Unakoti	Kailashahar	D. K. Chakma, IAS	Rathiranjan Debanth, IPS	1. Kumarghat; 2. Kailashahar	1. a) Kumarghat; 1. b) Pecharthal; 2. a) Gournagar	1. a) Kumarghat Municipal Council; 2. a) Kailashahar Municipal Council	298,574	686.97	
6	North Tripura	Dharmanagar	Chandni Chandran, IAS	Bhanupada Chakraborty, TPS Gr-1	1. Dharmanagar; 2. Kanchanpur; 3. Panisagar	1. a) Kadamtala; 1. b) Yuvarajnagar; 2. a) Dasda; 2. b) Jampuihill; 2. c) Laljuri; 3. a) Panisagar; 3. b) Damchara	1. a) Dharmanagar Municipal Council	415,946	1,422.19	
7	South Tripura	Belonia	Muhammad Sajad, IAS	Kulwant Singh, IPS	1. Santirbazar; 2. Belonia; 3. Sabroom	1. a) Bakafa; 1. b) Jolaibari; 2. a) Hrishyamukh; 2. b) Rajnagar; 2. c) Bharat Chandra Nagar; 3. a) Satchand; 3. b) Rupaichari; 3. c) Poangbari	1. a) Santirbazar Municipal Council; 2. a) Belonia Municipal Council; 3. a) Sabroom Nagar Panchayet	453,079	1,514.3	
8	West Tripura	Agartala	Vishal Kumar, IAS	Manik Das, TPS Gr-1	1. Sadar; 2. Mohanpur; 3. Jirania	1. a) Dukli; 2. a) Mohanpur; 2. b) Hezamara; 2. c) Lefunga; 3. a) Jirania; 3. b) Mandai	1. a) Agartala Municipal Corporation; 2. a) Mohanpur Municipal Council; 3. a) Ranirbazar Municipal Council	918,200	983.63	

== Demographics ==
The following is a list of the basic demographic data for the districts of Tripura based on the size of the district's area, arranged in descending order (The data input here is taken from 2011 Census; however, the new four districts were formed in 2012 so information on those are of 2012.)

District	Area in km^{2}	Population	Growth Rate	Sex Ratio	Literacy	Density/km^{2}
Dhalai	2,400	377,988	12.57	945	86.82	157
Gomati	1,522.8	436,868	14.15	959	86.19	287
Khowai	1,005.67	327,391	14.15	961	88.37	326
Sipahijala	1,044.78	484,233	14.15	952	84.14	463
Unakoti	591.93	277,335	10.85	966	87.58	469
North Tripura	1,444.5	415,946	17.44	968	88.77	288
South Tripura	1,534.2	433,737	14.15	956	85.09	283
West Tripura	942.55	1,017,534	12.57	972	91.69	973

== Demands for new districts ==
Political parties and local movements in Tripura have raised various demands for administrative reorganization, ranging from the creation of new districts to broader constitutional changes. The Indigenous People's Front of Tripura (IPFT) has sought to elevate the Tripura Tribal Areas Autonomous District Council (TTAADC) into a "Tipra Territorial Council" with enhanced legislative and executive powers under an amendment to Article 125 of the Constitution of India. Similarly, the Tipra Motha Party has campaigned for the creation of "Greater Tipraland", a proposed separate state for the indigenous Tiprasa people.

At the local level, there are demands to upgrade certain existing sub-divisions into full administrative districts to improve government reach. However, the state government has generally prioritized sub-divisional development packages over the notification of new districts.

List of Proposed Districts in Tripura Grouped by Current District
Proposed District	Expected Area of Jurisdiction	Rationale for Creation
Proposed from Khowai
Teliamura	Southern Khowai district, corresponding to the existing Teliamura sub-division.	Proposed by local movements to decentralize administration and improve governance reach in the southern tracts of the district.
Proposed from North Tripura
Kanchanpur	Southern North Tripura district, corresponding to the existing Kanchanpur sub-division.	Sought to enhance administrative accessibility and public service delivery for populations distant from the current district headquarters.
Proposed from Dhalai
Gandacherra	Southern Dhalai district, corresponding to the existing Gandacherra sub-division.	Demanded to bring administrative resources closer to residents, counteracting regional geographic challenges.

== See also ==
- Administrative divisions of India
- Proposed states and union territories of India
