= Melaghar Block =

- Block
- Location within Tripura Location within India
- Coordinates: 23.497°N 91.331°E
- Country: India
- Region: North-Eastern
- State: Tripura
- District: Sipahijala district

Area
  - Total: 212.87 km^{2} (82.19 sq mi)
- Elevation: 11 m (36 ft)

Population (2011)
  - Total: 121,474
  - Density: 571/km^{2} (1,480/sq mi)

Languages
  - Official: Bengali, English
  - Max. Spoken Language: Bengali, Kokborok, Hindi
- Time zone: UTC+5:30 (IST)
- PIN: 799115, 799131
- Vehicle registration: TR 01 XX YYYY, TR 07 XX YYYY
- Website: tripura.gov.in

Melaghar block is a developing block in Sepahijala district in the Indian state of Tripura, located about 50 km from the capital Agartala.
