= Maitri Setu =

Bridge between India and Bangladesh

Maitri Setu মৈত্রী সেতু मैत्री सेतु
- Coordinates: 22°59′49″N 91°43′25″E
- Carries: 2-lanes
- Crosses: Feni River
- Locale: North end: Sabroom in Tripura, India; South end: Ramgarh in Chittagong, Bangladesh.
- Other name(s): Gateway of Northeast
- Named for: Indo-Bangladesh friendship
- Maintained by: National Highways and Infrastructure Development Corporation Limited (NHIDCL)

Characteristics
- Material: Steel and concrete
- Total length: 1.9 kilometres (1.2 mi)
- No. of spans: Single span
- Piers in water: No

History
- Constructed by: Dineshchandra R. Agrawal Infracon (DRA Infracon)
- Construction start: June 2015
- Construction cost: ₹133 crore (US$16 million)
- Inaugurated: 9 March 2021

Maitri Setu (lit. 'friendship bridge') is a 1.9-kilometre (1.2 mi) bridge on Feni River which links Sabroom in Tripura, India and Ramgarh in Chittagong, Bangladesh leading to Chittagong port, thus providing a shorter and more economical alternate land route between India's eastern and western states compared to the longer route through Assam. On 9 March 2021, it was officially opened to public by Indian Prime Minister Narendra Modi and then Bangladesh Prime Minister Sheikh Hasina.

== History ==
In June 2015, the foundation stone for the bridge was officially laid by Modi and Hasina. The cost of constructing the bridge, as well as the approach roads to it in both Bangladesh and India, was borne by India. The bridge connects Sabroom in Tripura, India and Ramgarh in Chittagong, Bangladesh leading to Chittagong port providing landlocked North East India with access to the sea, and enabling the transport of heavy machines and goods to North East India via Bangladesh. It also links National Highway 8 in India to Baraiyaghat-Magarcheri Road in Bangladesh across Feni river. The bridge is constructed and being maintained by National Highways and Infrastructure Development Corporation Limited (NHIDCL). The bridge was constructed by Ahmedabad based Dineshchandra R. Agrawal Infracon Private Limited (DRA Infracon) at cost of ₹ 82.57 crore.

The bridge was inaugurated on 9 March 2021 by Prime Ministers Modi and Hasina via video conference. The bridge was named "Maitri Setu" symbolizing the growing friendship and bilateral ties between India and Bangladesh. The construction was taken up by the Government of India at a project cost of ₹133 crore.

== Technical features ==
The bridge is 1.9-kilometre (1.2 mi) long including its approaches and roads. The bridge is 150-metre (490 ft) long otherwise. It is a single span pre-stressed concrete bridge.

== Significance ==
The bridge plays a very important economic role as a major trade route to Northeast India, with access to Chittagong Port, which is just 80 kilometres (50 mi) from the border. Land route between Agartala and Kolkata Port through this bridge is just 450 km via Bangladesh compared to the 1600 km land route via Siliguri Corridor. Logistics cost from Agartala to Kolkata Port will be 80% lower, as compared to the Siliguri Corridor, if the goods are sent through this bridge via Chattogram Port 200 km away.

== Future connectivity ==
A rail link extension to Chittagong Port and Cox's Bazar deep water port in Bangladesh by rehabilitating the railway link from Santir Bazar railway station in India to Feni Junction railway station in Bangladesh is planned which will also provide the strategic redundancy and alternative to Kaladan Multi-Modal project route if there is a war with China.

== See also ==
- Look East policy (India)
- Bangladesh–India relations
- Bangladesh–India border
