= Arunachal Junction railway station =

Railway station in Assam, India

Arunachal Junction

General information
- Location: National Highway 53, Masimpur, Silchar, Assam; India
- Coordinates: 24.8557°N 92.7428°E
- Elevation: 26 metres (85 ft)
- System: Indian Railways Station
- Owner: Indian Railways
- Operator: Northeast Frontier Railway zone
- Line: Lumding–Sabroom section
- Platforms: 1
- Tracks: 3
- Connections: Auto rickshaw, bus, taxi

Construction
- Structure type: Standard (on-ground station)

Other information
- Status: Functioning
- Station code: ARCL
- Zone(s): Northeast Frontier Railway zone
- Division(s): Lumding

History
- Former names: Assam Bengal Railway
Location
- Location within Assam Location within India

Arunachal Junction Railway Station is a small railway station in Silchar Cachar district, Assam. Its code is ARCL.

== Location ==
It is located in Silchar city.

== Infrastructure ==
The station consists of 3 platforms.

== Lines ==
The 1,676 mm (5 ft 6 in) broad gauge conversion which includes the reconstruction of the railway station started in October 2014 as part of the Lumding–Badarpur–Silchar railway section of the Northeast Frontier Railway zone of the Indian Railways.
