= Gomati district =

Coordinates: 23.56°N 91.62°E

Gomati district Gomati Hangkor (Kok Borok)
- District of Tripura
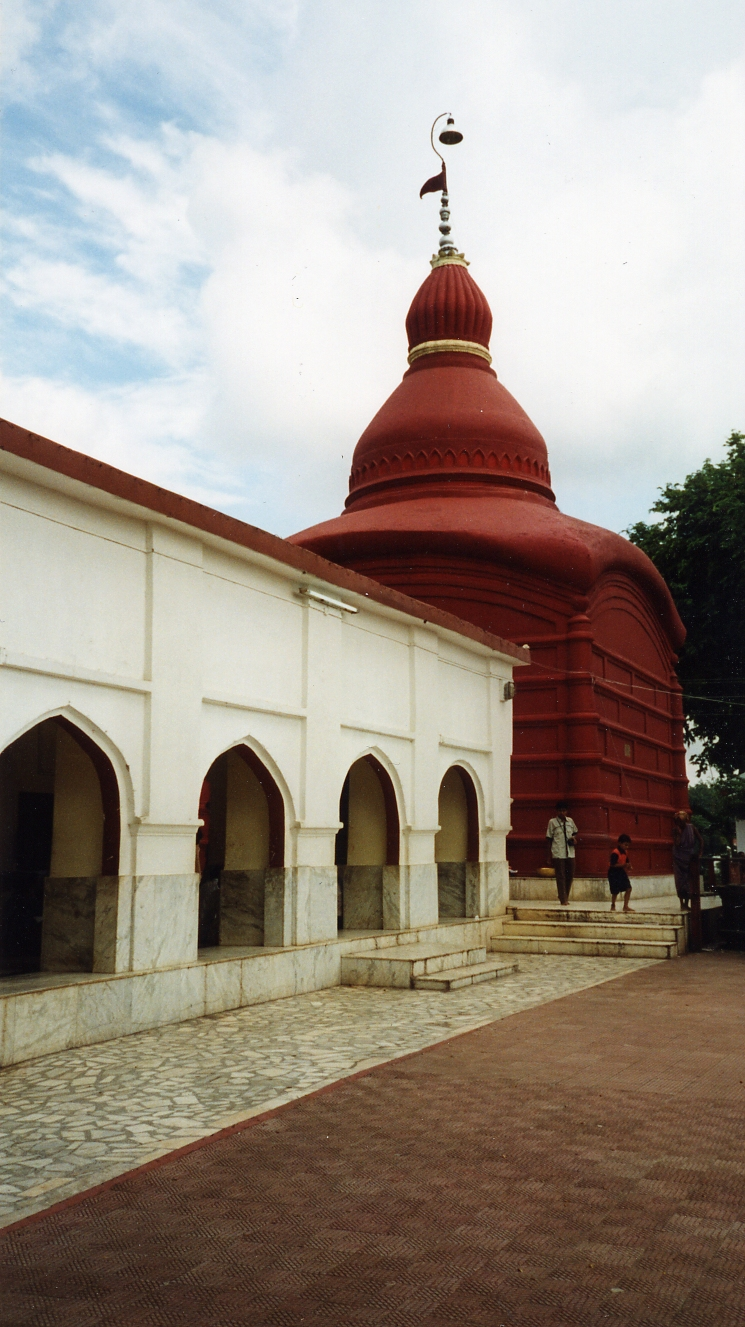
- Tripureshwari (Tripura Sundari) Temple
- Interactive map of Gomati district
- Country: India
- State: Tripura
- Established: January 2012
- Headquarters: Udaipur

Area
  - Total: 1,522.8 km^{2} (588.0 sq mi)

Population (2011)
  - Total: 441,538
  - Density: 289.95/km^{2} (750.97/sq mi)

Demographics
  - Literacy: 100%
- Time zone: UTC+05:30 (IST)
- Website: gomati.nic.in

Gomati district is a district of Tripura, India. This district was created in January 2012 when four new districts were created in Tripura, taking the number of districts in the state from four to eight. Udaipur is its headquarters.

The district is famous for its Mata Tripura Sundari Temple which is situated about 3 km away from Udaipur at Matabari. The temple is one of the 51 Mahapithasthans of India. The Gomati figures prominently in Tripura's native folklore, culture, religious rites and ritual so much so that Tripuri people perform posthumous rites.

== Geography ==
Topographically, the Gomati district features the Gomati valleys and the Debtamura hill range, which extends across the Udaipur and Amarpur subdivisions and is notable for its rock-cut relief sculptures along the hill panels.

There are 173 villages in this district. The whole district is served by 16 police stations. The only municipality in the district is Udaipur.

== Division ==
There are three sub-divisions in Gomati district. They are Udaipur subdivision, Amarpur subdivision and Karbook subdivision.

There are eight blocks under Gomati District. They are Matabari, Tepania, Killa, Kakraban, Amarpur, Ompi, Karbook and Silachhari

== Places of interest ==
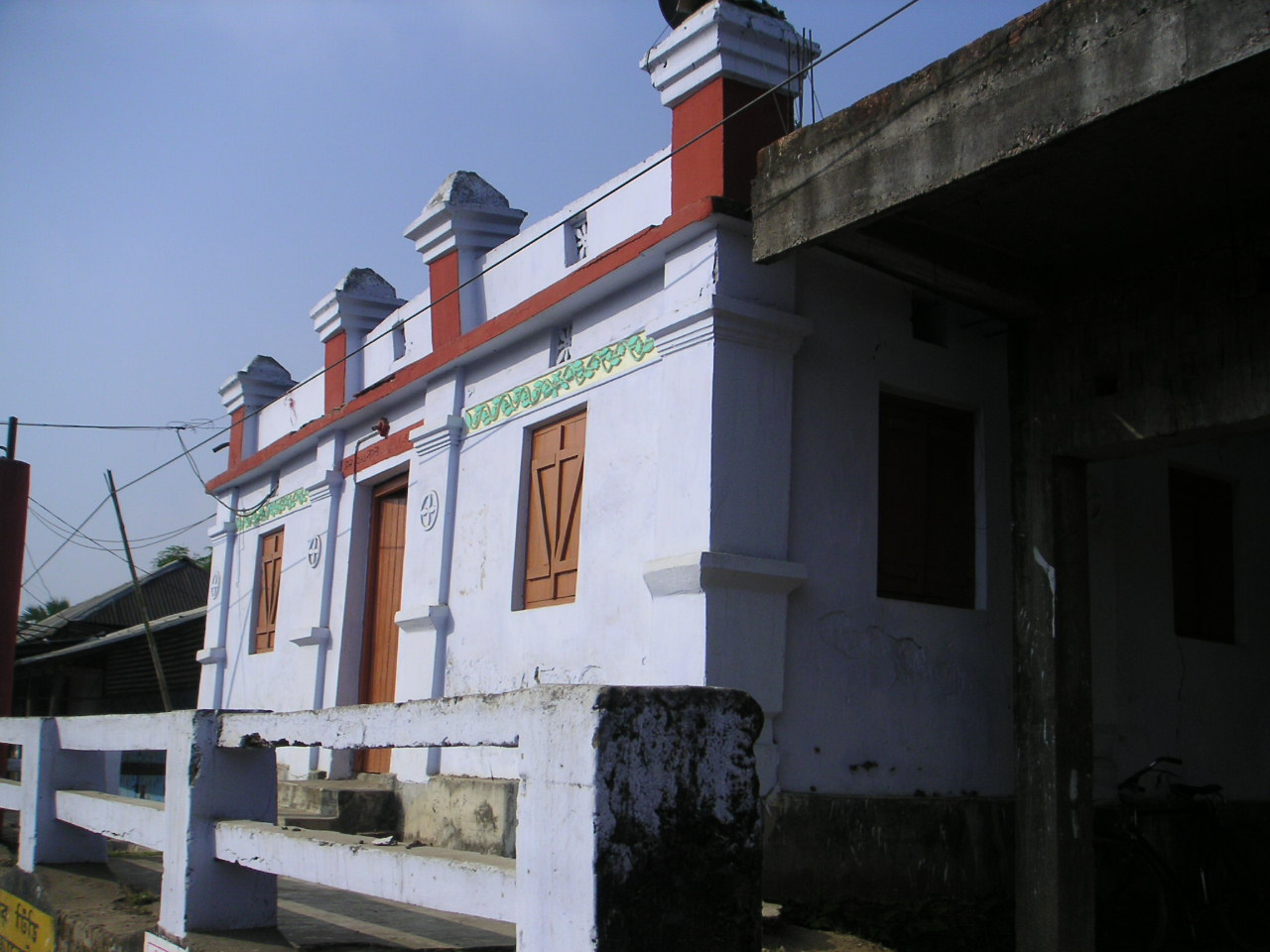
Mosque in Amarpur

Places of Interest at Gomati district are as follows:

1. Tripureshwari Mandir –This is the main attraction of the district. This temple was built on 1501 by Maharaja Dhanya Manikya.
2. Bhuvaneswari Temple – The temple is situated besides the river Gomati and is located close to the old royal palace which lies in ruins today. The Bhuvaneswari Temple is dedicated to Goddess Bhuvaneswari and was built in the 17th century by Maharaja Govinda Manikya.
3. Old Rajbari – The Ruins of Rajbari, When Udaipur was the capital of the state. Kabiguru Rabindranath Tagore Visited this place.
4. Gunabati Temple – Commonly known as Gunabati Mandir Gucchha, it is a group of three temples. Stone inscription of one temple reveals that it was built in the name of Her Highness Maharani Gunabati (wife of Maharaja Govinda Manikya), in 1668 A.D.
5. Chobimura – Rock-carved images of Devi Durga and other deities are present here on the bank of River Gomati.
6. Tepania eco-park – This park is situated by the side of NH-8. This place has lush green forest and a tree house which are maintained very carefully.
7. Tirthmukh — Another pilgrimage centre, located in this district in Amarpur Sub Division.

== Transport ==
=== Roadway ===
National Highway 8 (NH 8), running from Karimganj in Assam to Sabroom in Tripura, passes through this district.

=== Railway ===
Lumding–Sabroom line of Northeast Frontier Railway passes through Sipahijala district. The segment from Agartala to Sabroom via Udaipur may become operational in 2016. There are two stations in the district, namely Udaipur Tripura railway station and Garjee railway station, providing connectivity to Tripura capital Agartala and Assam and other major cities of the state like Dharmanagar, Udaipur and Belonia.

== Awards ==
The district received the prestigious Prime Minister's Award for Excellence in Public Administration for the year 2024.

== Gallery ==
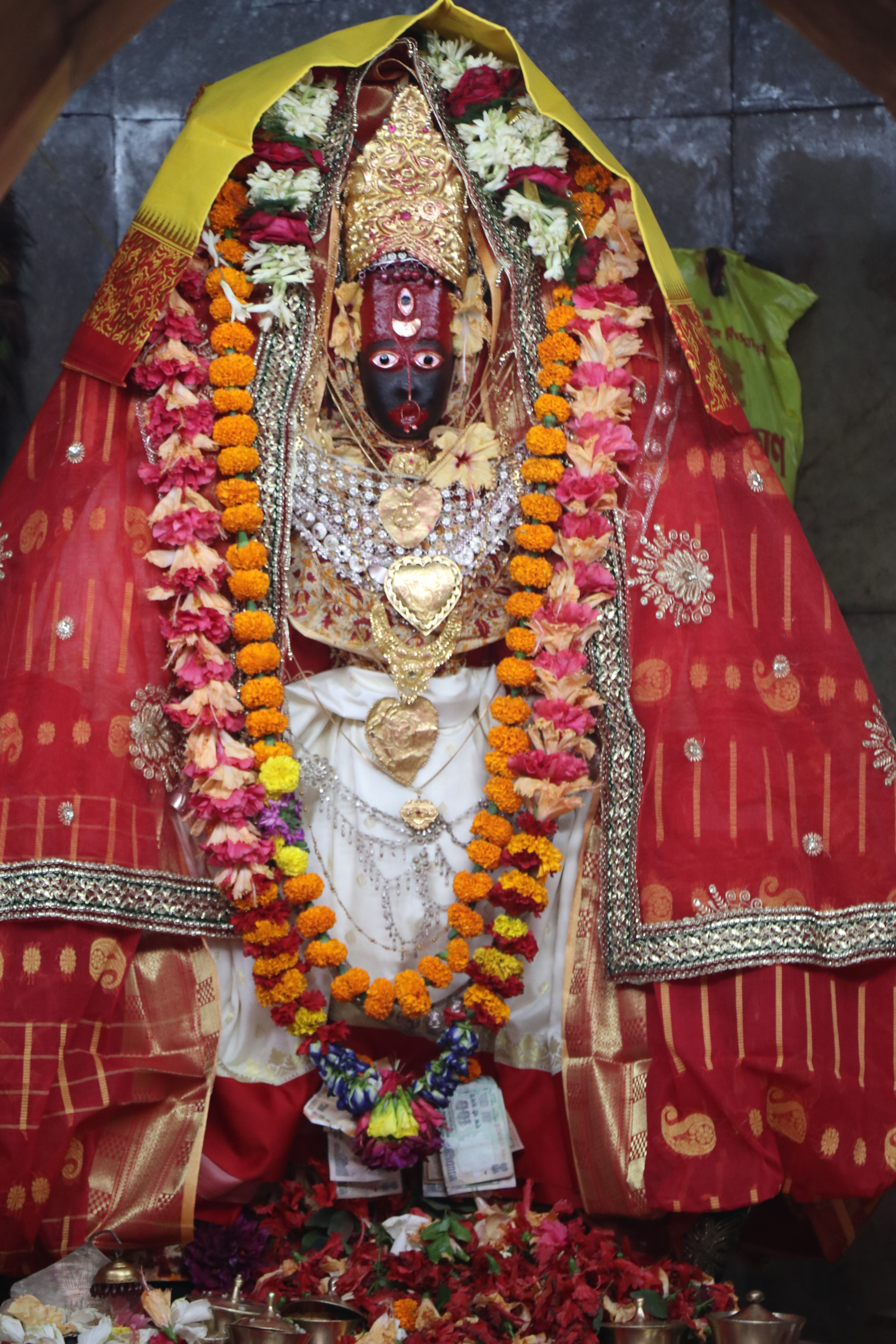
Goddess Tripura Sundari

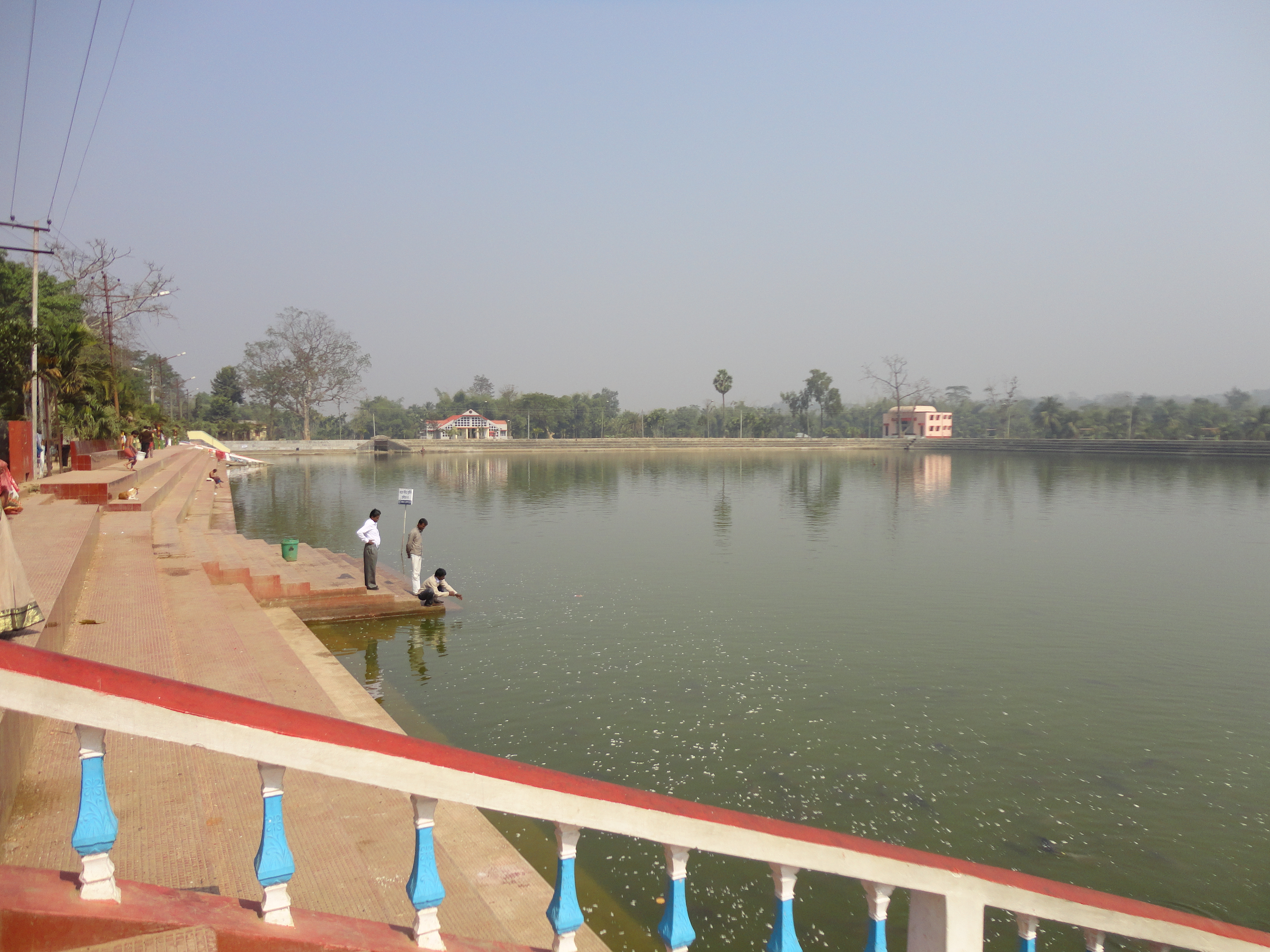
Kalyan sagar

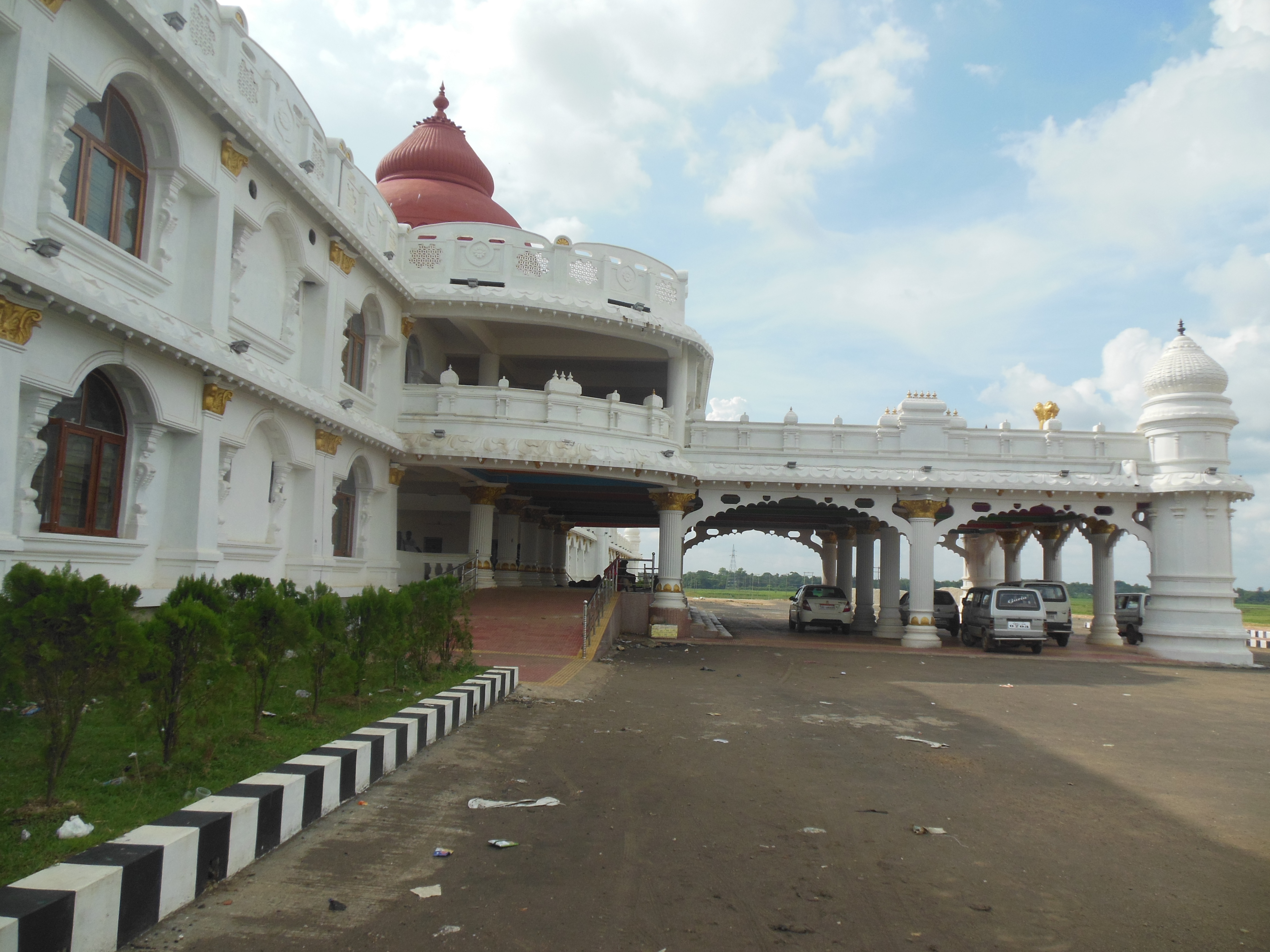
Udaipur railway station

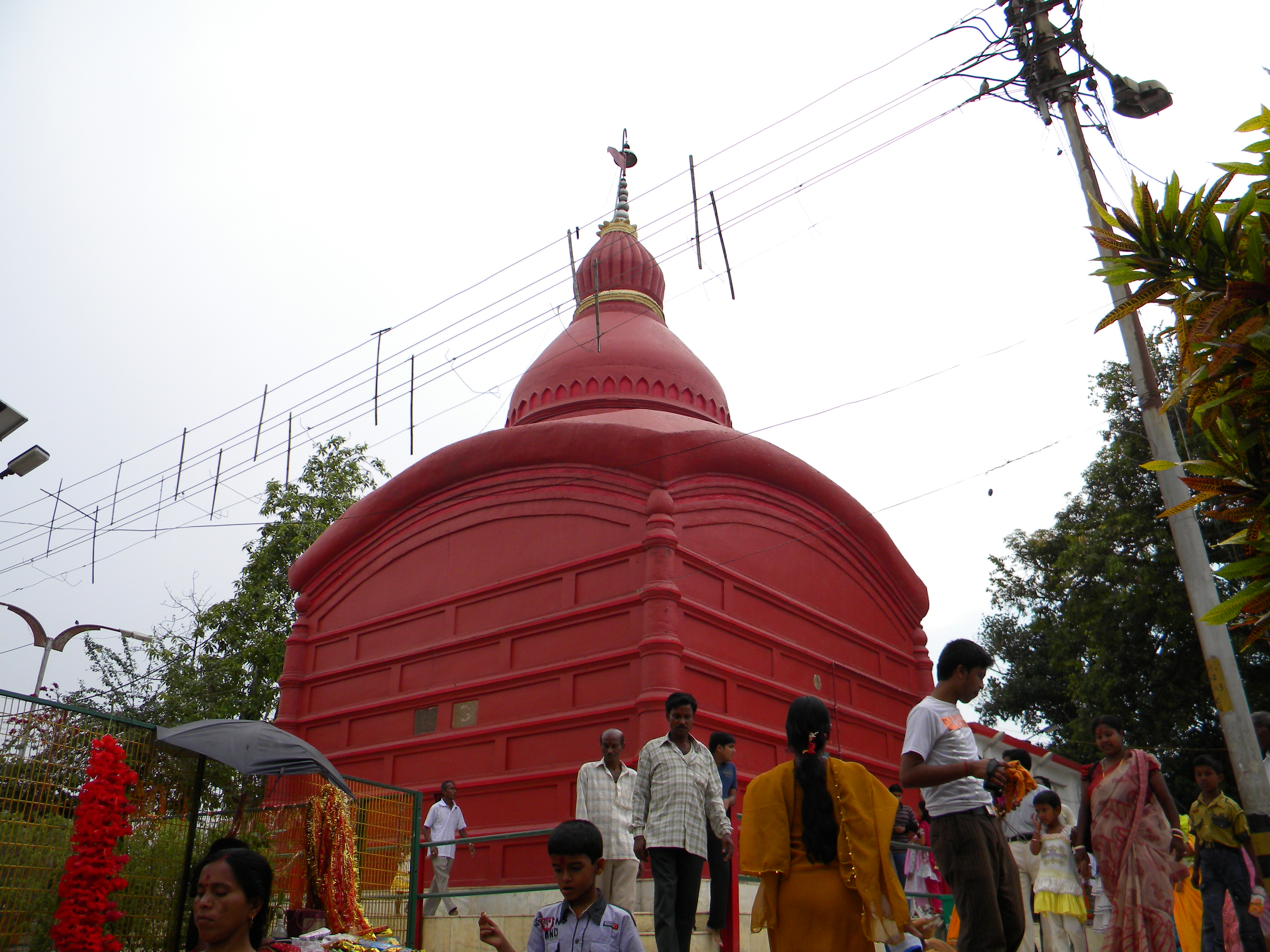
Tripura Sundari temple

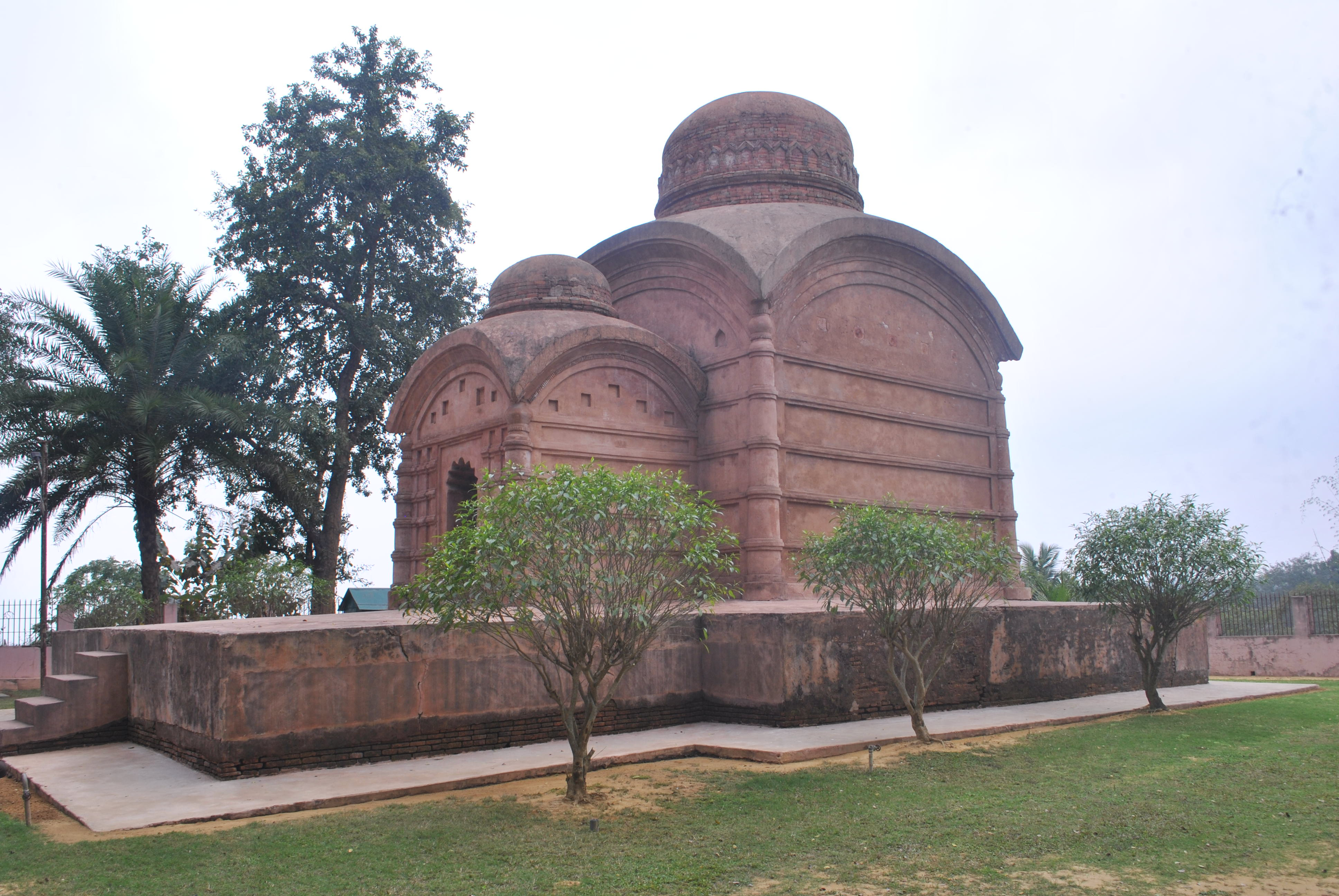
Bhubaneswari Temple, Rajnagar, Udaipur
