= Haibargaon railway station =

Railway station in Nagaon district, Assam, India

Coordinates: 26.3570°N 92.6733°E

Haibargaon Railway Station is a railway station located in Nagaon district, Assam, India. It operates under the Northeast Frontier Railway (NFR) zone and falls within the Lumding railway division. The station code is HBN. Situated at an elevation of 68 meters above sea level, Haibargaon serves as a crucial node in the middle Assam.

== History ==
Established in 1887 during British colonial rule, Haibargaon Railway Station was originally constructed to support the burgeoning tea industry in Assam. Over the years, it has played a vital role in facilitating transportation and commerce in the region.

== Redevelopment ==
In 2025, Haibargaon Railway Station became the first in Assam to be redeveloped under the Amrit Bharat Station Scheme. Inaugurated virtually by PM Modi on 22 May 2025, the ₹15.85 crore project blends modern amenities with Assamese cultural elements like gamosa, Bihu, and Ahom architecture. The upgrade is set to boost connectivity and tourism, serving as a gateway to destinations like Kaziranga National Park and Laokhowa Sanctuary.
