= Garjee–Agartala Passenger =

Train in India

Udaipur Tripura - Agartala Passenger
Overview
- Service type: Passenger
- First service: 20 January 2017; 8 years ago
- Current operator: Northeast Frontier Railway

Route
- Termini: Udaipur (UDPU); Agartala (AGTL)
- Stops: 3
- Distance travelled: 43 km (27 mi)
- Average journey time: 1h 10m
- Service frequency: 6 days a week
- Train number: 55683/55684

On-board services
- Class: Unreserved
- Seating arrangements: No
- Sleeping arrangements: Yes
- Catering facilities: No
- Entertainment facilities: No

Technical
- Rolling stock: 2
- Track gauge: 1,676 mm (5 ft 6 in)
- Operating speed: 25 km/h (16 mph)

Agartala - Udaipur Tripura Passenger is a passenger express train of the Indian Railways connecting Agartala in Tripura and Udaipur Tripura in Tripura. It is currently being operated with 55683/55684 train numbers on six a day basis.

== Service ==
The 55683/55684 has an average speed of 37 km/h and covers the 43 km in 1 hrs 15 mins.

== Route and halts ==
- Udaipur
- Bishramganj
- Bishalgarh
- Sekerkote
- Agartala

== Traction ==
Both trains are hauled by a WDM-3A diesel locomotive based at the New Guwahati Locomotive Shed.

== Coach composite ==
The train consists of 13 coaches:

- 4 General
- 1 Second-class Luggage/parcel van

== Rake maintenance ==
The train is maintained by the Silchar Coaching Depot. The same rake is used for Agartala - Udaipur Tripura Passenger for one way which is altered by the second rake on the other way.

== See also ==
- Agartala railway station
- Udaipur railway station
