= Mungiakami railway station =

Railway station located at Mungiakami in Tripura, India

Mungiakami Railway Station
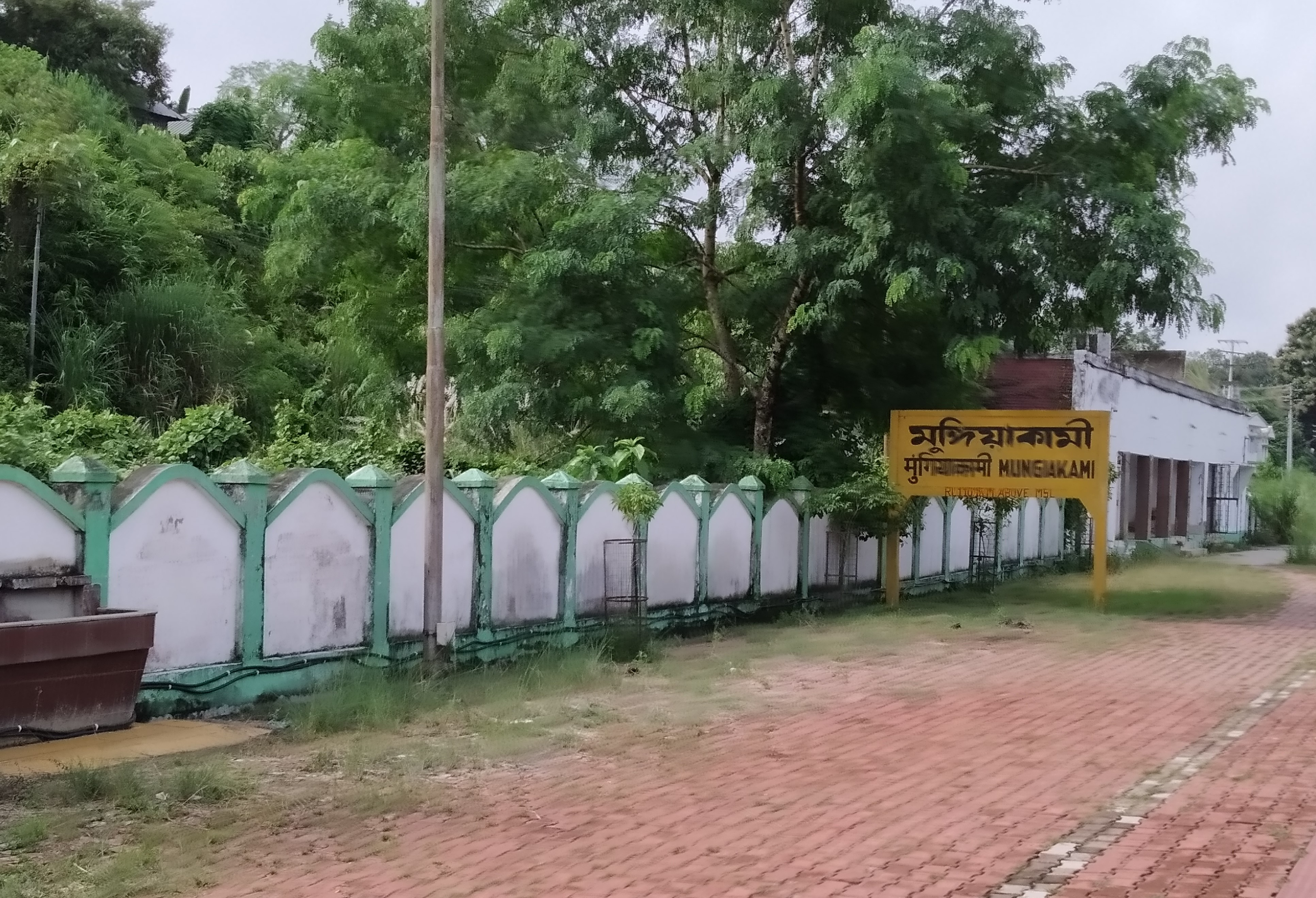
- Mungiakami railway station

General information
- Location: Shillong Road, Mungiakami, Khowai, Tripura; India
- Coordinates: 23.8833°N 91.7081113°E
- Elevation: 125 m (410 ft)
- System: Indian Railways station Regional rail
- Owner: Indian Railways
- Operator: Northeast Frontier Railway
- Line: Lumding–Sabroom section
- Platforms: 2
- Tracks: 3
- Connections: Auto rickshaw

Construction
- Structure type: Standard (on-ground station)
- Parking: Available

Other information
- Status: Functioning, Multiple Diesel-Line
- Station code
- Zone(s): Northeast Frontier Railway zone
- Division(s): Lumding

History
- Opened: 2008; 18 years ago
- Rebuilt: 2016; 10 years ago

Services
Preceding station	Indian Railways	Following station
Teliamura towards ?	Northeast Frontier Railway zone Lumding–Sabroom section	Ambassa towards ?
Location
- Location within Tripura

Mungiakami Railway Station is located at Mungiakami in Khowai district, Tripura, India. It is a station of the Lumding–Sabroom line in the Northeast Frontier Railway zone of Indian Railways. Four passenger trains halt at the station daily.

== History ==
Mungiakami railway station became operative in 2008 with the meter-gauge line from Lumding to Agartala; in 2016 the entire section was converted to broad-gauge.

== Details ==
The station lies on the 312 km-long 1,676 mm (5 ft 6 in) broad-gauge Lumding–Sabroom railway line which comes under the Lumding railway division of the Northeast Frontier Railway zone of Indian Railways. It is a single line without electrification.

== Services ==
Trains that stop at Mungiakami station are:

- 1 train per day in each direction between Agartala and Dharmanagar.
- 1 train per day in each direction between Agartala and Silchar.

== Station ==
=== Station layout ===
G	Street level	Exit/Entrance & ticket counter
P1	FOB, Side platform, No-1 doors will open on the left/right
P1	Track 1
P1	Track 2
P1	Track 3
P1	FOB, Side platform, No- 2 doors will open on the left/right

=== Platforms ===
There are 2 platforms and 3 tracks. These platforms are built to accommodate 24 coaches express train.

== See also ==
- Teliamura
- Lumding–Sabroom section
- Northeast Frontier Railway zone
