= Feni River =

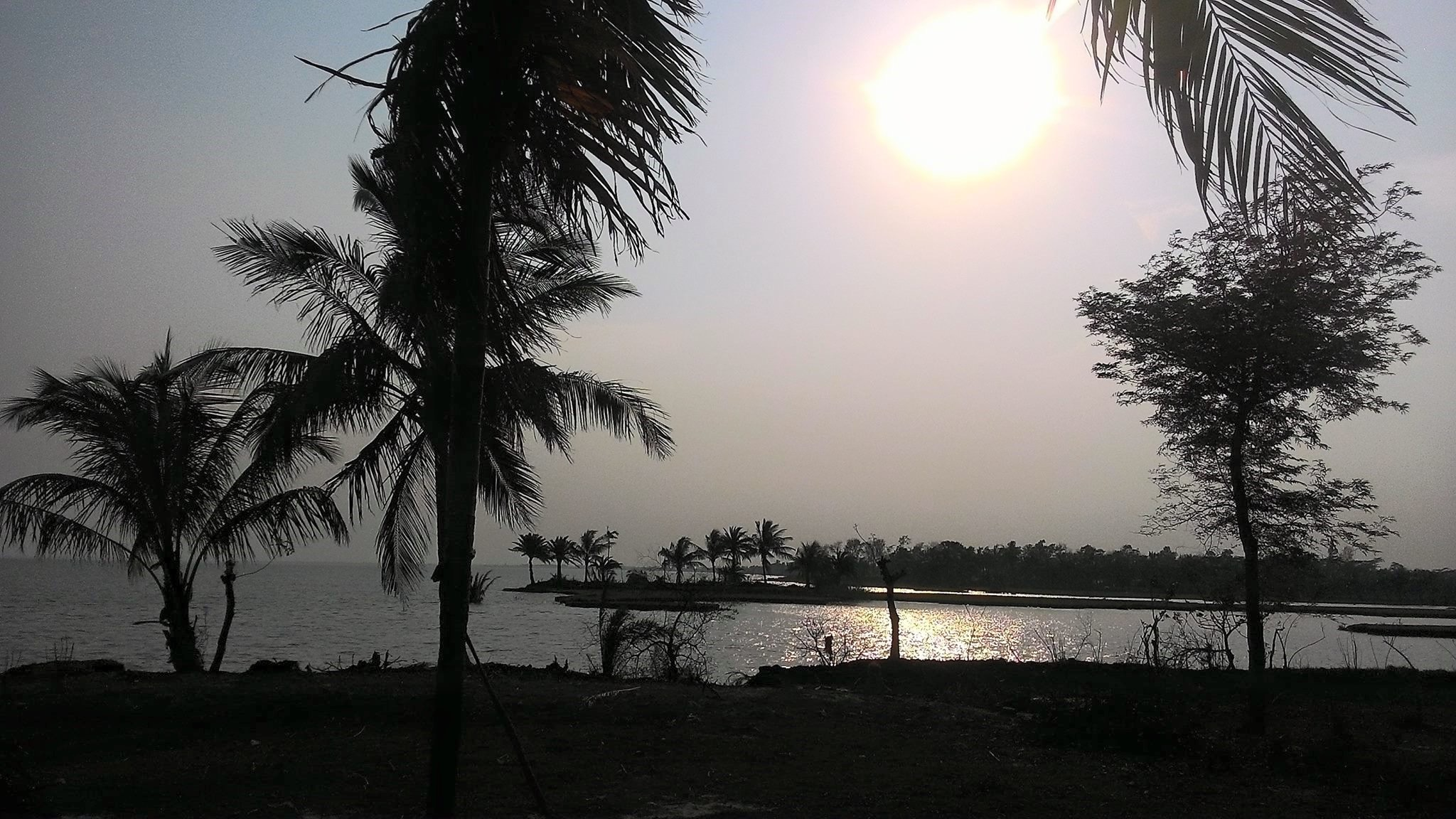
- Native name: ফেনী নদী (Bengali); Phēnī Nadī (Bengali)

Location
- Countries: Bangladesh and India
- District: Khagrachari
- State: Tripura

Physical characteristics
- Source
  - location: Khagrachari district, Bangladesh
  - coordinates: 23°20′N 91°47′E
- Mouth: Bay of Bengal
- Length: 116 km (72 mi)
- Discharge
  - location: Bay of Bengal

Basin features
- Tributaries
  - right: Muhuri River

The Feni (Bengali: ফেনী নদী ; ISO: Phēnī Nadī ) is a river in southeastern Bangladesh and Tripura state of India. It is a trans-boundary river that is the subject of an ongoing dispute about water rights between the two countries. The Feni River originates in South Tripura district and flows through Sabroom town and then enters Bangladesh. Muhuri River, also called the Little Feni, from Noakhali District joins it near its mouth. The river is navigable by small boats as far as Ramgarh, about 80 kilometres (50 mi) upstream.

The question of sharing the waters of the river between India and Pakistan was first discussed in 1958, and after its 1971 independence, Bangladesh continued that discussion with India. Through at least 2006 the countries continued to consider possible compromises.

== Course ==
Feni River originates in South Tripura district and flows through Sabroom town and then enters Bangladesh. Muhuri River, also called Little Feni, from Noakhali District joins it near its mouth. The river is navigable throughout the year by small boats up to Ramgarh, some 80 kilometres (50 mi) upstream.

== Dispute ==
The question of sharing the waters of the river between India and Bangladesh (then East Pakistan) was discussed as early as 1958.

Reports from Bangladesh in 2007 said, "India is trying to withdraw water from Feni River for irrigation projects in exchange for resolving erosion problem in [sic] Bangladesh side of this bordering river."

According to the statement on sharing of river waters with Bangladesh, released by India in 2007, "Feni River has been added to its mandate in the 36th JRC [Joint Rivers Commission] meeting. A decision was taken in the meeting that the Ministers of Water Resources of both countries would visit the sites where developmental works have been held up. This Joint Inspection of various locations of developmental and flood protection works on common rivers was held from September 14–21, 2006."

== Inland port in Tripura ==
Sabroom in South Tripura, in India, is only 18 to 20 kilometres (11 to 12 mi) from the Bay of Bengal, but it is a virtually landlocked territory. In 2007, there was a thinking that an inland harbor could be built at Sabroom, connected to the sea through a canal if Bangladesh allowed it. The construction of such a harbor could reduce considerably the cost of transportation of goods from the rest of India to Tripura and the north-east of India. However, the idea had not been acted on through 2007.

== Bridge ==
A bridge is built over the Feni River to link up with Tripura. Construction was set to begin in December 2010 for the 150-metre (490 ft) link between Sabroom and Ramgarh. The bridge provides the only land link between India's eastern states and its western states other than through Assam.

The foundation stone for the bridge was officially laid by Indian Prime Minister Narendra Modi and Bangladesh Prime Minister Sheikh Hasina in June 2015. The cost of constructing the bridge, as well as the approach roads to it in both Bangladesh and India, will be borne by India. The Tripura Public Works Department was appointed to execute the project. When completed, the bridge will connect Tripura with the Chittagong port in Bangladesh providing landlocked North East India with access to the sea, and enabling the transport of heavy machines and goods to North East India via Bangladesh.

The bridge was inaugurated on 9 March 2021 by the prime ministers Modi and Hasina via video conference. The bridge was named "Maitri Setu" symbolizing the growing friendship and bilateral ties between India and Bangladesh.

== Feni dam ==
The Feni is closed near the sea by the Feni dam. This dam was constructed in 1985 to prevent flooding by surging the lower reaches of the Feni due to cyclones and make a large area suitable for agriculture. The dam is mainly constructed by manual labour. Between the dam and the Bay of Bengal, the river is a tidal river.
