= Chittamara, Belonia =

Chittamara
- Village
- Location within Tripura Location within India
- Coordinates: 23.303574°N 91.486192°E
- Country: India
- State: Tripura
- District: South Tripura district

Area
  - Total: 12.5 km^{2} (4.8 sq mi)

Population (2011)
  - Total: 3,450
  - Density: 276/km^{2} (715/sq mi)

Languages
  - Official: Bengali, Kokborok, English
- Time zone: UTC+5:30 (IST)
- PIN: 799155
- Vehicle registration: TR
- Website: tripura.gov.in

Chittamara is a village in South Tripura district in the Indian state of Tripura, located in the UTC 5.30 time zone and it follows Indian standard time (IST). Chittamara sun rise time varies -36 minutes from IST. The vehicle driving side in Chittamara is left, all vehicles should take left side during driving. Chittamara people are using its national currency which is Indian Rupee and its international currency code is INR. It lies on the border with Bangladesh. It contains a SBI Branch and tehsil. The native language of Chittamara is Bengali, Kokborok and most of the village people speak Bengali, Kokborok. Chittamara people use Bengali, Kokborok language for communication.

== Demographics ==
As of 2011 India census, Chittamara had a population of 3450. with SC Population 360, ST Population 1277 & OBC population 1278. Chittamara has an average literacy rate of 95%, higher than the national average of 74%.

== Politics ==
Chittamara is part of Belonia (Vidhan Sabha constituency).

Currently BJP is ruling in this Gram Panchayat, with 11 GP Member.

Shri Biswajit Majumder ~ ex president of BJP Chittamara Village committee & currently one of the core member of Chittamara GP committee.

Late Smt. Arati Majumder [2018 - 2023 till her death (16 December 2023)] from this village, elected as a Panchayat Shamiti member of Bharat Chandra Nagar RD Block.

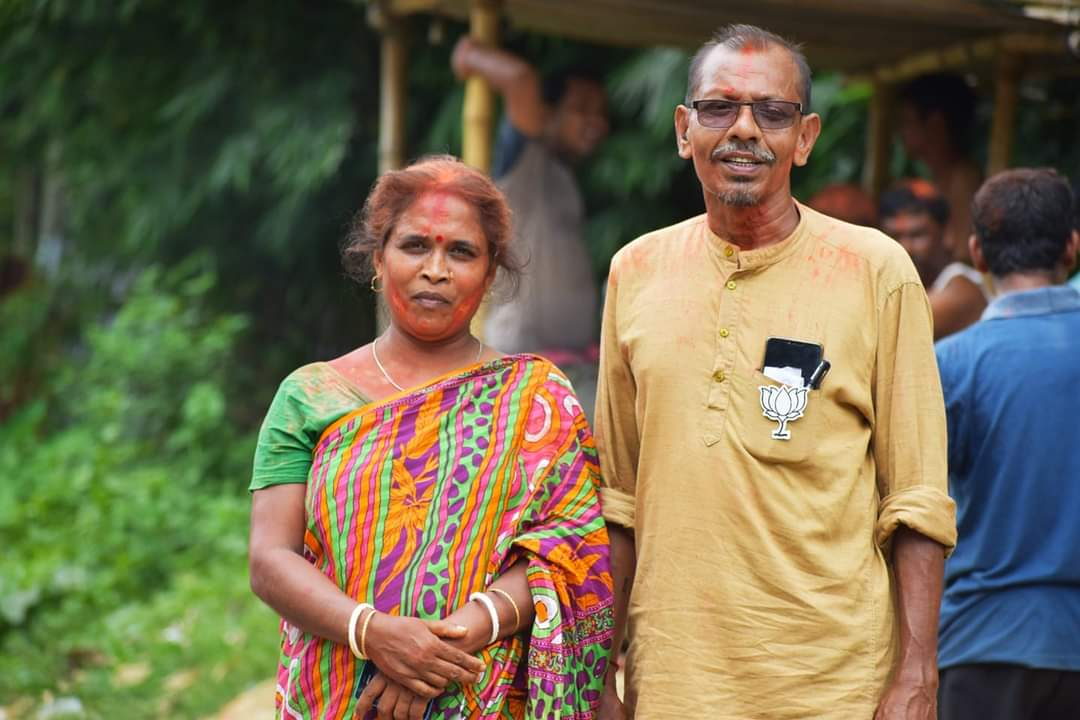
Picture of Shri Biswajit Majumder And Late Smt Arati Majumder, Picture from the election result day, 3rd March 2018

Shri.Bhrighuram Ram Tripura, elected as a Up-Pradhan of Chittamara GP.

== Education ==
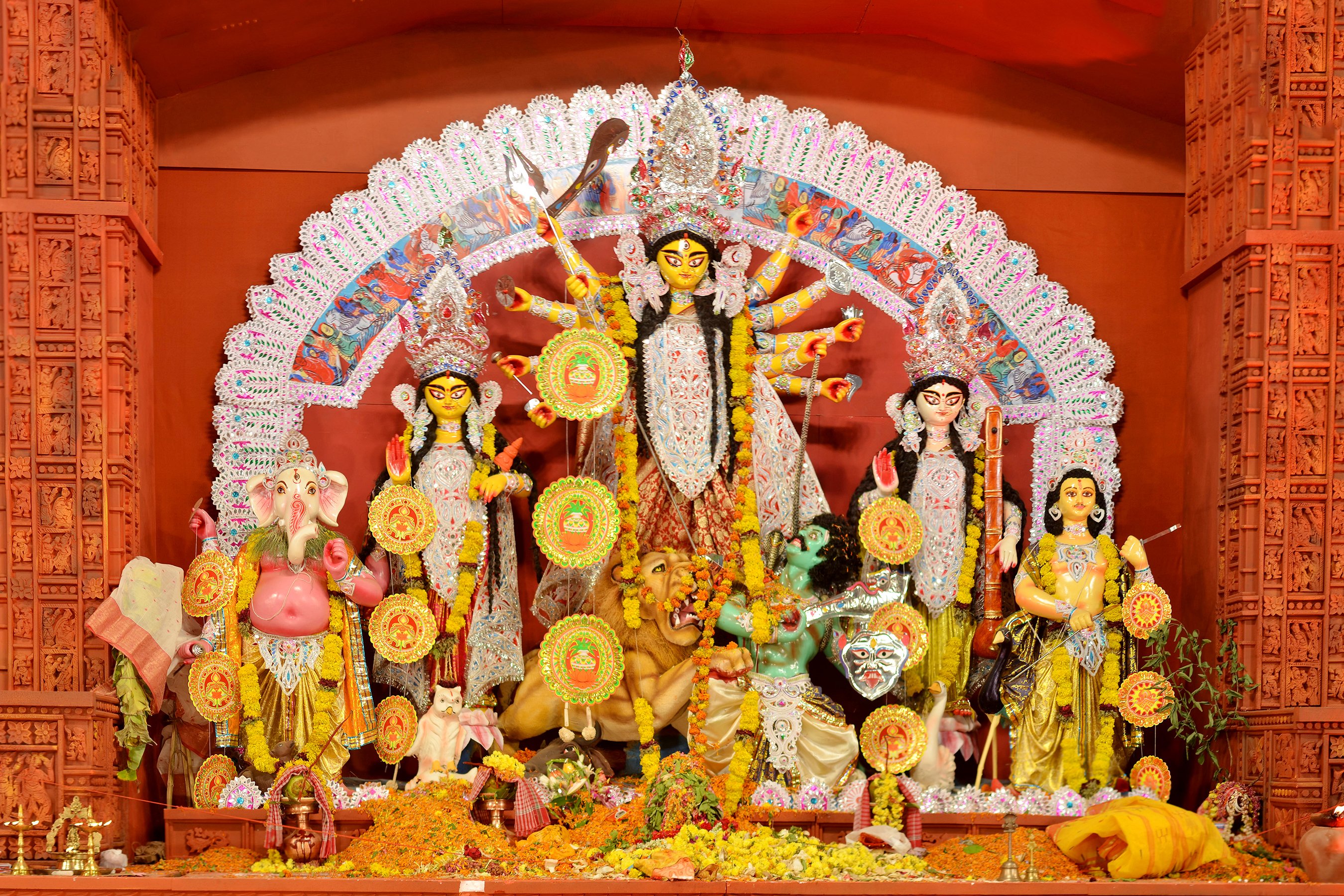
Durga Puja is the biggest festival of Chittamara As well as state Tripura and celebrated the second biggest in India after West Bengal

Schools in Chittamara are run by the state government. Instruction in schools is mainly in English or Bengali, though Kokborok and other regional languages are also used. The schools are affiliated to the Tripura Board of Secondary Education. After completing secondary school, students typically enroll for two years in a junior college or in a higher secondary school affiliated either to the Tripura Board of Secondary Education or to other central boards & for that student have to go in town area. Apart from traditional Higher education like, MBBS, B.E., B.Tech., Agri B.Sc./M.Sc. students from this place are taking professional courses likes Company Secretary, M.Tech., MCA, MBA, and PGDM. Students are also venturing to other parts of the world to take higher education. Chittamara has a total of 4 schools, Brinda Ban Royaja Para High School is one of them having 2 storey building.

== Culture ==
The diverse ethno-linguistic groups of Tripura have given rise to a composite culture. The dominant ethnic groups are Bengali, Manipuri, Tripuris, Jamatia, Reang, Murasing & Chakma.

== Sports ==
Football and cricket are the most popular sports in the village.

Former track and field sprinter Saraswati Saha belongs from this village, She holds the current 200 metres national record of 22.82 seconds set at the National Circuit Athletic Meet held in Ludhiana on 28 August 2002.
