= Bishramganj =

- Town
- Location within Tripura Location within India
- Coordinates: 23°36′28.066″N 91°20′50.264″E
- Country: India
- State: Tripura
- District: Sepahijala
- Elevation: 15 m (49 ft)

Languages
  - Official: Kokborok, English
- Time zone: UTC+5:30 (IST)
- PIN: 799103
- Vehicle registration: TR-07
- Website: tripura.gov.in

Bishramganj is a small town and the headquarters of Sipahijala district in the Indian state of Tripura, situated about 35 km from the capital, Agartala.
