= Belonia, India =

Belonia
- Municipal council
- Location within Tripura Location within India
- Coordinates: 23.25°N 91.45°E
- Country: India
- State: Tripura
- District: South Tripura

Government
  - Type: Municipal Council
  - Body: Belonia Municipal Council
  - Chairman: Nikhil Chandra Gope (BJP)
- Elevation: 23 m (75 ft)

Population (2015)
  - Total: 21,176

Languages
  - Official: Bengali; Kokborok; English
- Time zone: UTC+5:30 (IST)
- Pin: 799155
- Telephone code: 03823
- Vehicle registration: TR 08
- Website: southtripura.nic.in

Belonia is a town and municipal council in South Tripura district, Tripura, India. It is also the headquarters of South Tripura District. It is linked with Agartala (the state capital) by National Highway 108A from Belonia to Jolaibari and via National Highway 8 from Jolaibari to Agartala. Belonia lies on the border with Bangladesh.

== Geography ==
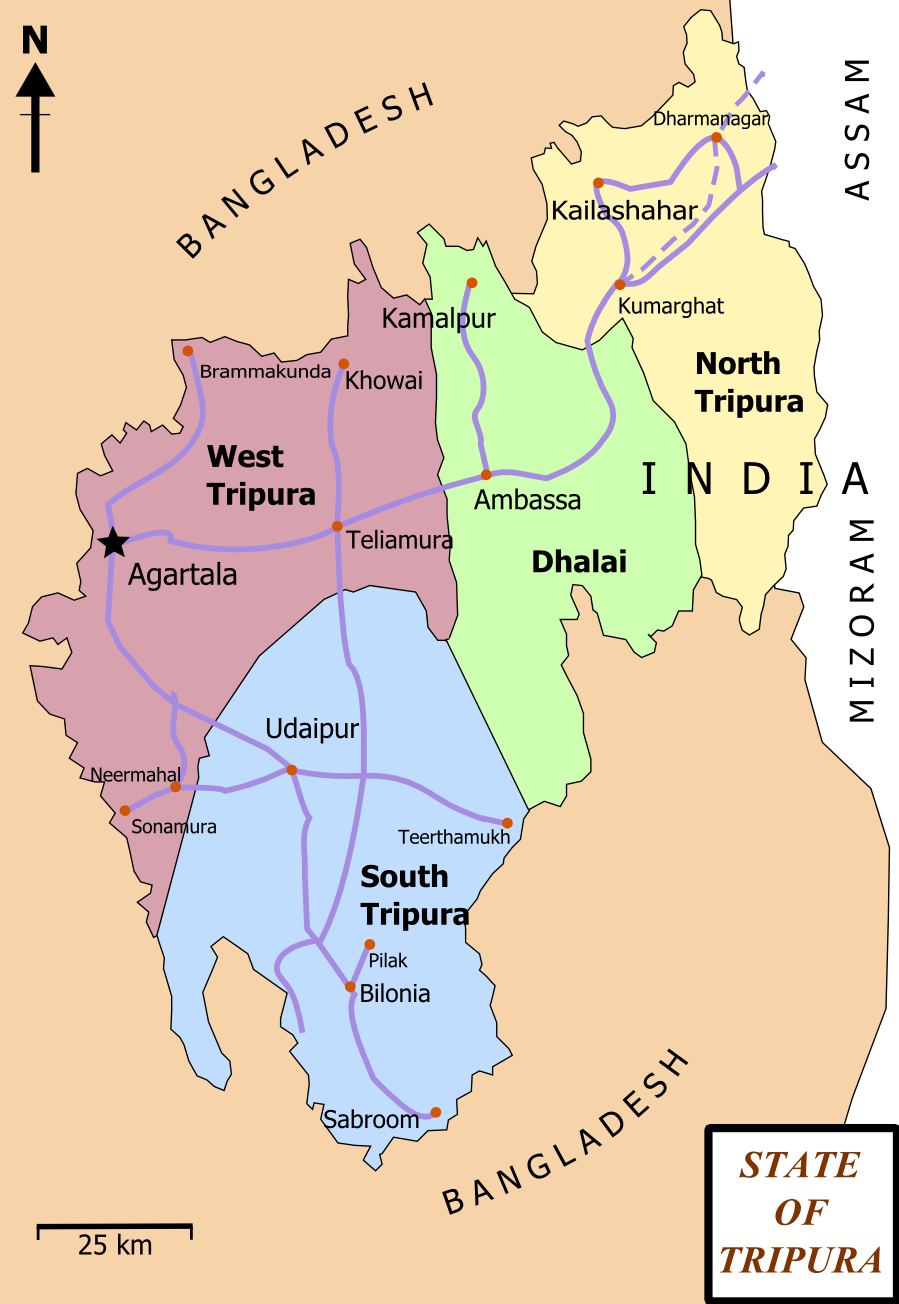
State of Tripura having 8 districts, roadways & small railway network

Belonia is located at 23.25°N 91.45°E. It has an average elevation of 23 metres (75 feet).

== Demographics ==
At the 2011 India census, Belonia Municipal Council had a population of 19,996. Males constituted 52% of the population and females 48%. Belonia had an average literacy rate of 95%, higher than the national average of 59.5%; with 54% of males and 46% of females literate. 9% of the population was under six years of age.

== Education ==
Schools:

- Belonia Vidyapith H/S School
- Brajendra Kishore Institution
- Arya Colony H/S School
- S.B.C Nagar H/S School
- Barpathari H/S School
- Brindaban Royaja Para High School, Chittamara, Belonia
- Manurmukh High School
- Amjadnagar High School
- Belonia Govt. English Medium H.S. School
- Belonia Girls H.S. School
- Satmura S.B School
- Ganoyday S.B School
- South Mirzapur High School
- North Belonia High School
- East Mirjapur High School

Colleges:

- Iswar Chandra Vidyasagar College
- ITI College

== Places of interest ==
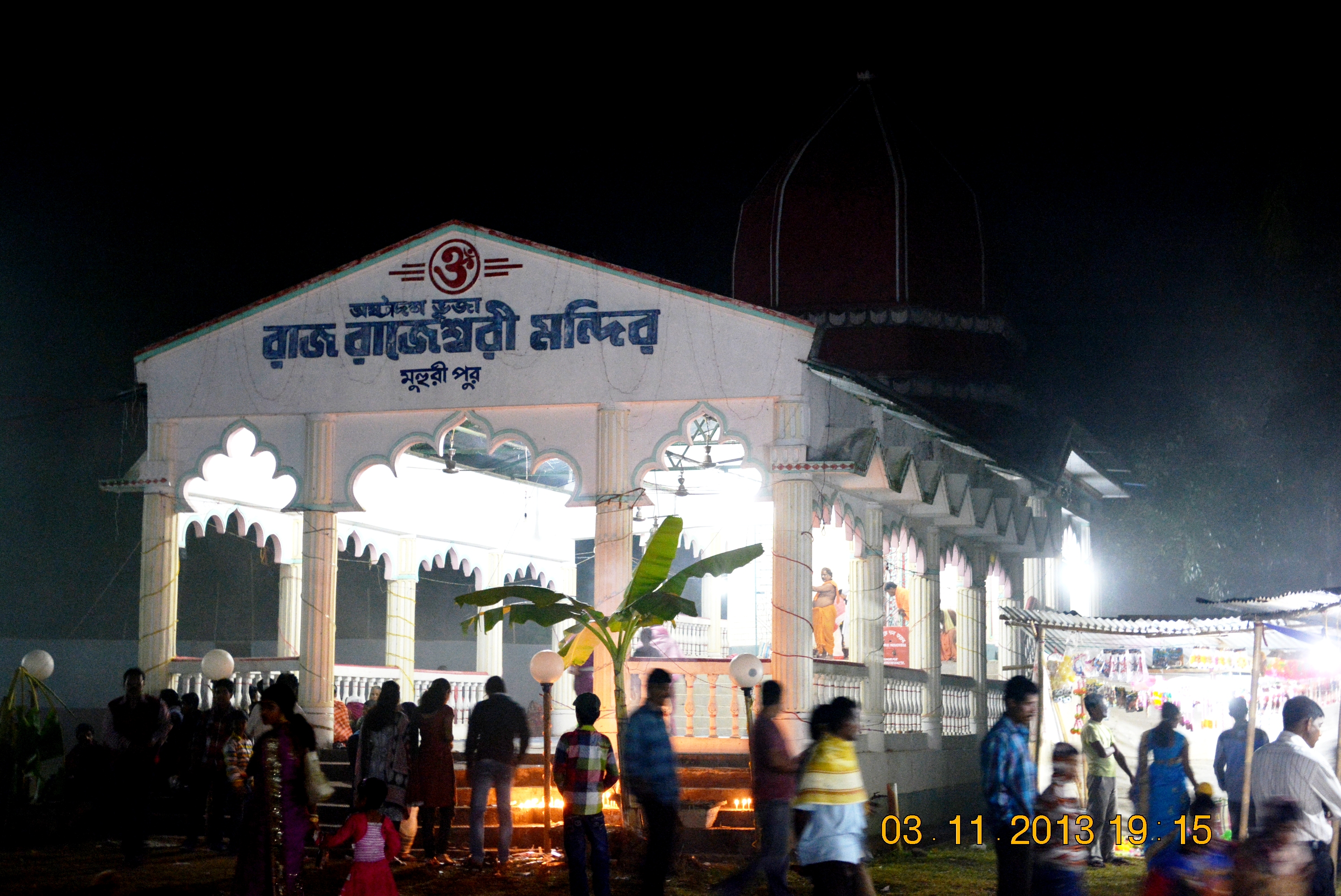
Temple of Debi Raj Rajeswari.

- Pilak-Pathar, 12th century Hindu-Buddhist archaeological site preserved by ASI, about 12 kilometres (7.5 mi) away
- Trishna Wildlife Sanctuary
- Yogmaya Temple, Kalibari
- Indo-Bangla Custom Checkpost
- Raj Rajeswari Temple, Muhuripur
- Muhurichar river island
- Muhuripur Fishery near Bamchara
- Bharat - Bangladesh Maitri Uddyan (Chottakhola, under Rajnagar RD Block). It is a memorable place for the liberation war of Bangladesh in 1971 AD.
- Eco park. It is located at Baroj colony under Belonia Municipal Area
- Chabi tilla at Munda basti.

== Belonia railway station ==
A railway service in Belonia (code: BENA) serve up to Agartala (code: AGTL), Service started from February 2019. Right now everyday (except Sunday), 2 pairs of trains run between Belonia and Agartala. The station lies on the Agartala - Sabroom rail section, which comes under the Lumding railway division of the Northeast Frontier Railway. The segment from Agartala to Sabroom via Udaipur became operational on 3 October 2019, with a proposed elevation of 39m.

=== Integrated Check Post (ICP) ===
Belonia Railway station here at border of India will have Integrated Check Post for immigration and customs and will connect Indian railway network 120 km away with Chattogram port in Bangladesh via Feni.

== Civic Administration ==
The city is represented by the Belonia constituency in Tripura's legislative assembly whose present MLA is Deepankar Sen.

In the Indian parliament, Belonia is represented by the Tripura West Lok Sabha constituency, whose Member of Parliament is Pratima Bhoumik.

== See also ==
- North Eastern Railway Connectivity Project
- List of cities and towns in Tripura
