= Lumding–Sabroom section =

Railway line in India

Overview
- Status: Operational
- Owner: Indian Railways
- Locale: Assam and Tripura in India
- Termini: Lumding; Sabroom

Service
- Operator(s): Northeast Frontier Railway

History
- Opened: 2008

Technical
- Line length: 505 km (314 mi)
- Number of tracks: 1
- Track gauge: 1,676 mm (5 ft 6 in)
- Old gauge: Metre gauge
- Electrification: Not electrified / Diesel operated
- Operating speed: 100 km/h (62 mph)

The Lumding–Sabroom section is a railway line under Lumding railway division of Northeast Frontier Railway zone of Indian Railways. It is a single 1,676 mm (5 ft 6 in) broad-gauge track from Lumding in Hojai district of Assam state to Agartala, the capital of Tripura state. The 44 kilometres (27 mi) long 1,676 mm (5 ft 6 in) segment from Agartala southwards to Udaipur, Tripura was completed in 2016 and became operational on 23 January 2017. The remaining 70 kilometres (43 mi) long track to Sabroom at the bank of Feni River at Bangladesh border was completed in 2019 and became operational on 3 October 2019.

== History ==
The British introduced 6 important trains after the 363 kilometres (226 mi) long Guwahati-Lumding-Badarpur Junction MG line was completed in 1914. These were 2 MG trains between Guwahati and Silchar, 1 MG train between Silchar & Sylhet, 1 MG Train between Silchar & Dhaka, 1 MG Train between Dhaka & Hailakandi & 1 between Guwahati & Dhaka. In 1947 after partition, 4 trains were permanently withdrawn with only 2 MG trains between Guwahati and Silchar running until 1992. After conversion of Guwahati–Lumding to broad gauge in 1992, the originating and ending station of these train was changed to Lumding. Post partition, Railway service was established in Tripura in 1964 by constructing metre gauge track from Karimganj to Dharmanagar and Kailashahar in Tripura, but the track did not connect the state capital Agartala. The foundation stone of the 119 kilometres (74 mi) Kumarghat–Agartala railway line project was laid in 1996. The 87 kilometres (54 mi) long segment from Manu to Agartala became operational in 2008. It was a meter-gauge single track without electrification. The 5695/15696 Lumding-Agartala Express was started in 2008. In 2014, all trains were stopped & the line was converted to 1,676 mm (5 ft 6 in) broad gauge in 2016. A new 44 kilometres (27 mi)-long track was laid from Agartala to Udaipur, Tripura in 2017. The remaining 70 kilometres (43 mi) long track to Sabroom at the bank of Feni River at Bangladesh border was completed by 2019 and became operational on 3 October 2019.

== Important stations ==
- Lumding Junction
- Manderdisa Junction
- Langting
- Maibang
- New Halflong
- New Harangajao
- Jatinga-Lampur
- Chandranathpur
- Badarpur Junction (Branch line to Silchar)
- Karimganj Junction (Branch line to Maishashan-Latu/Bangladesh Border)
- New Karimganj Junction
- Baraigram Junction (Branch line to Dullabcherra)
- Dharmanagar
- Kumarghat
- Ambassa
- Agartala Junction (Branch line to Akhaura/Bangladesh Border)
- Udaipur, Tripura
- Belonia
- Jolaibari
- Sabroom

== Railway lines to Manipur and Mizoram ==
On June–July 2025, Indian Railways has successfully completed Bairabi - Sairang (near Aizawl) Broad Gauge Railway line linking Mizoram. The railway connection to Imphal is in progress & completed till Khongsang. Important stations in these routes are:-

Badarpur Junction - Silchar Section:- Badarpur Junction, Katakhal Junction, Arunachal Junction & Silchar. This section is 30 kilometres (19 mi) long with 75 km/h (47 mph) max speed allowance.

Silchar - Sairang Section:- Silchar, Arunachal Junction, Katakhal Junction, Hailakandi, Lalabazar(Lala), Bairabi, Sairang. This section is 154 kilometres (96 mi) long (From Silchar), with Bairabi - Sairang part of 51 kilometres (32 mi) is completed.

Silchar - Imphal Section: - Silchar, Arunachal Junction, Jiribam, Vangaichungpao, Rani Gaidinliu, Thingou, Khongsang. This section is completed upto Khongsang & is 110 kilometres (68 mi) long (From Silchar). 12097/12098 Agartala - Khongsang Janshatabdi Express runs on this route.

== Future construction ==
The track may be extended further from Sabroom to Chittagong port which is 75 km from the India–Bangladesh border. A branch line from Agartala to Akhaura in Bangladesh, is under construction. This line will reduce the distance between Kolkata and Agartala to about 729 kilometres (453 mi), from current about 1,550 kilometres (960 mi) via Guwahati. But Indian Government have suspended the project after 5 August 2024 owing to Political Chaos in Bangladesh.

== See also ==
- Karimganj Junction
- Guwahati–Silchar Express
- North Eastern Railway Connectivity Project
