= South Tripura district =

- District
- South Tripura district Location in Tripura
- Coordinates: 23°32′N 91°29′E
- Country: India
- State: Tripura
- Headquarter: Belonia

Area
  - Total: 1,514.3 km^{2} (584.7 sq mi)
- Elevation: 26 m (85 ft)

Population (2011)
  - Total: 453,079
  - Density: 299.20/km^{2} (774.93/sq mi)
- Time zone: UTC+05:30 (IST)
- ISO 3166 code: IN-TR
- Website: southtripura.nic.in

South Tripura district is an administrative district in the state of Tripura in northeastern India.

== History ==
The district came into existence on 1 September 1970, when the entire state was divided into three districts.

== Geography ==
The district occupies an area of 2,152 km^{2} (831 sq mi). The district headquarters are located at Belonia.

== Divisions ==
District has three sub divisions (Belonia, Sabroom and Santirbazar).

The district resides in two Lok Sabha constituencies: Tripura West (shared with West Tripura district) and Tripura East (shared with Dhalai and North Tripura districts. It is also split between seven Legislative assembly constituencies : Belonia, Hrishyamukh, Jolaibari, Manu, Rajnagar, Sabroom and Santirbazar.

== Demographics ==
According to the 2011 census South Tripura district has a population of 876,001, roughly equal to the nation of Fiji or the US state of Delaware. This gives it a ranking of 471st in India (out of a total of 640). The district has a population density of 286 inhabitants per square kilometre (740/sq mi) . Its population growth rate over the decade 2001–2011 was 14.03%. South Tripura has a sex ratio of 957 females for every 1000 males, and a literacy rate of 85.41%.

Parameters	Particulars
Total population	4,53,079
Male	2,34,118
Female	2,18,961
SC Population (No. and % of total population)	74,020 (16.33%)
ST Population (No. and % of total population)	1,62,463 (35.85%)
Rural Population (in lakh)	4,14,426
Urban Population (in lakh)	38,653
Population Density (Ratio)	299 per Sq. Km.
Sex Ratio	935 Female per 1000 Male
Literacy Male (in percentage)	93.39%
Literacy Female (in percentage)	79.54%
Literacy Total (in percentage)	85.09%
Total geographical area (in Sq. Km.)	1514.3 Sq. Km.

== Flora and fauna ==
In 1987, South Tripura district became home to the Trishna Wildlife Sanctuary, which has an area of 195 square kilometres (75 sq mi). It is also home to the Gumti Wildlife Sanctuary, which was established in 1988 and has an area of 390 square kilometres (150 sq mi).
