= Udaipur, Tripura =

Udaipur
- Town
- Udaipur
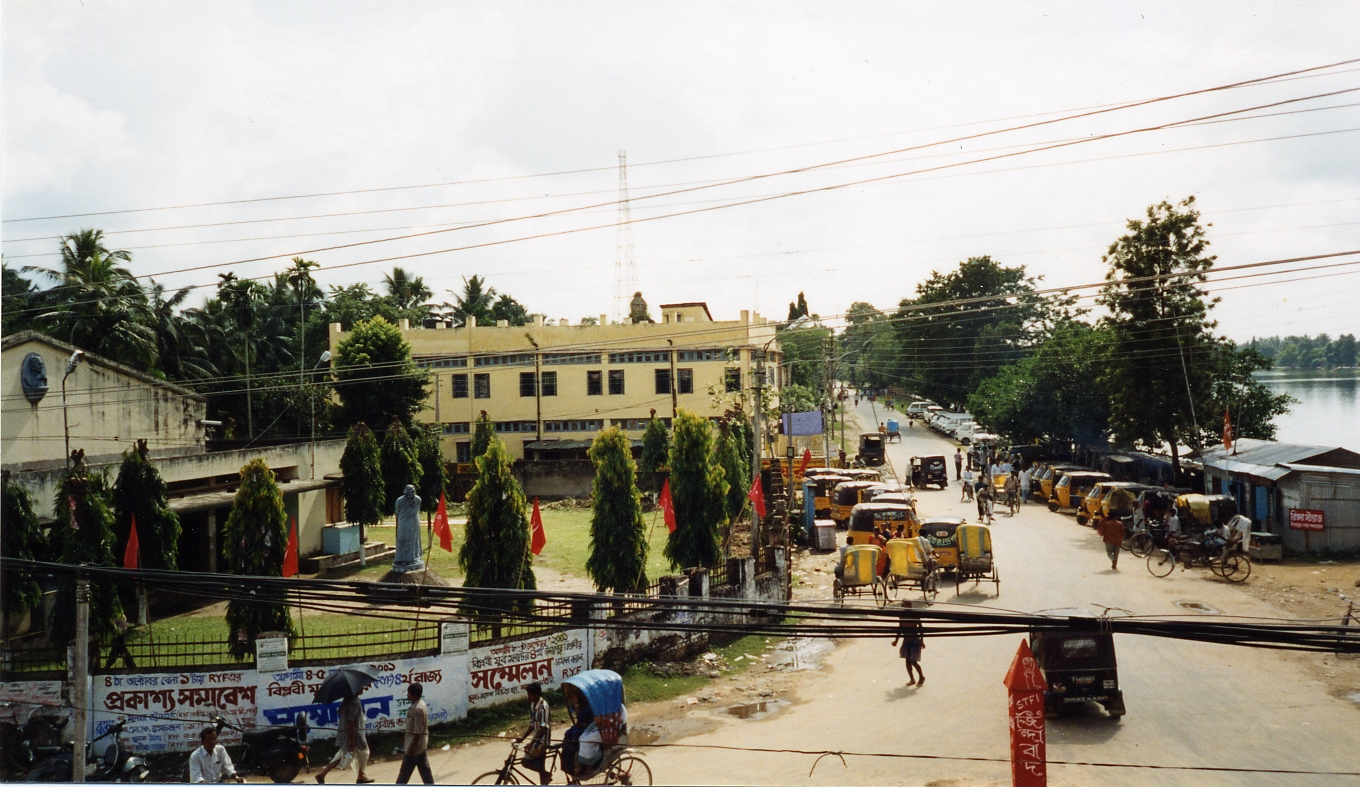

- Location in Tripura, India Udaipur (India)
- Coordinates: 23°32′20″N 91°29′30″E
- Country: India
- State: Tripura
- District: Gomati district
- Named for: Udai Manikya

Government
  - Type: Municipal Council
  - Body: Udaipur Municipal Council
  - Chairman: Sital Chandra Majumdar (BJP)
- Elevation: 22 m (72 ft)

Population (2011)
  - Total: 32,758
  - Rank: 3rd (in Tripura)

Languages
  - Official: Bengali, Kokborok, English
- Time zone: UTC+5:30 (IST)
- Postal code: 799120
- Vehicle registration: TR-03
- Website: gomati.nic.in

Udaipur (Bengali pronunciation: [udɔe̯pur]), formerly known as Rangamati, is the third biggest urban area in the Indian state of Tripura. The city was the capital of the state during the reign of the Manikya dynasty. It is famous for the Tripura Sundari temple also known as Tripureswari temple, one of the 51 Shakta pithas. It is a Municipal Council in Gomati district & also the headquarter of Gomati district. Udaipur is about 55 km from Agartala, the capital of Tripura.

== Geography ==
Udaipur is located at 23.53°N 91.48°E. It has an average elevation of 22 meters (72 feet)from the sea level. The Gomati river passes through the heart of Udaipur and helps in irrigation of its lands.

== Demographics ==
As of 2011 India census, Udaipur Municipal Council had a population of 32,758, of which 16,593 were males and 16,165 were females. The total number of literates in Udaipur were 28,378, of which 14,563 were males and 13,8155 were females. Udaipur has an effective literacy rate (for population 7 years and above) of 94.84%, of which male literacy is 96.50%, and female literacy is 93.15%. In Udaipur, 2,836 is the population in the 0-6 age range. It had 8530 households. And the number of Scheduled Castes and Scheduled Tribes in Udaipur are 6,323 and 363 respectively.

== Attractions in Udaipur ==
Udaipur is dotted with temples the most famous of which is the Tripura Sundari temple, which is one of the 51 Shakta pithas. The temple was constructed by Maharaja Dhanya Manikya Debbarma in 1501. There is a big lake beside the temple known as Kalyan Sagar. Bhubaneshwari Temple is another famous temple here. Gunabati temple, Jagannath temple, Mahadev Temple are other famous temples. Udaipur is also known as "lake city" and has many beautiful lakes. Some of them are Jagannath dighi, Mahadev Dighi, Amar sagar, Dhanisagar and as mentioned above, Kalyan sagar. It also has a national library named "Nazrul Granthagar", named after famous poet Kazi Nazrul Islam. Tepania Eco Park and Old Rajbari are other attractions of Udaipur. It is called the tourism capital of Tripura.

== Education ==
=== General Degree Colleges ===
- Netaji Subhash Mahavidyalaya, erstwhile Udaipur Government Degree College is present at Dhwajanagar beside NH 8.

=== Schools ===
- Vivekananda Vidyapith Higher Secondary School.
- Jawahar Navodaya Vidyalaya, at Fulkumari has hostel facility for the students.
- Udaipur English Medium HS School (Best)
- Ramesh HS School

== Transportation ==
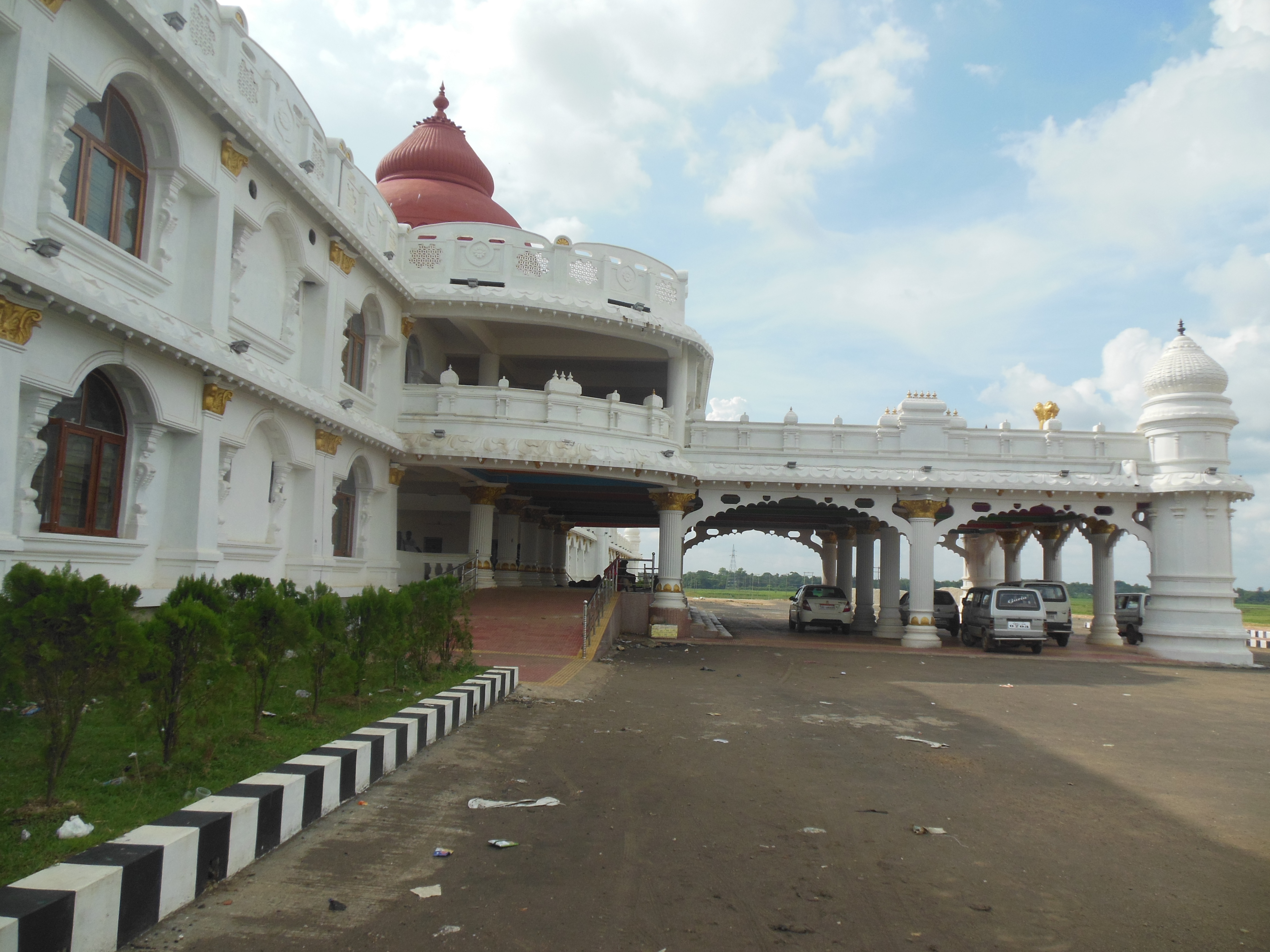
Udaipur railway station

Udaipur railway station is situated near Matabari. The station lies on the Lumding–Sabroom section, which comes under the Lumding railway division of the Northeast Frontier Railway. It is one of India's most beautiful railway stations with mesmerising architecture. Udaipur lies on NH 8, Agartala to Sabroom segment. From Rajarbag Bus Stand all day road connectivity is available towards capital Agartala and other cities of the state. The biggest river of the state Gomati is passing besides the town. To create a water connectivity through the river by increasing the depth of the river is a part of one of the auspicious future project of the central govt.

== Image gallery ==
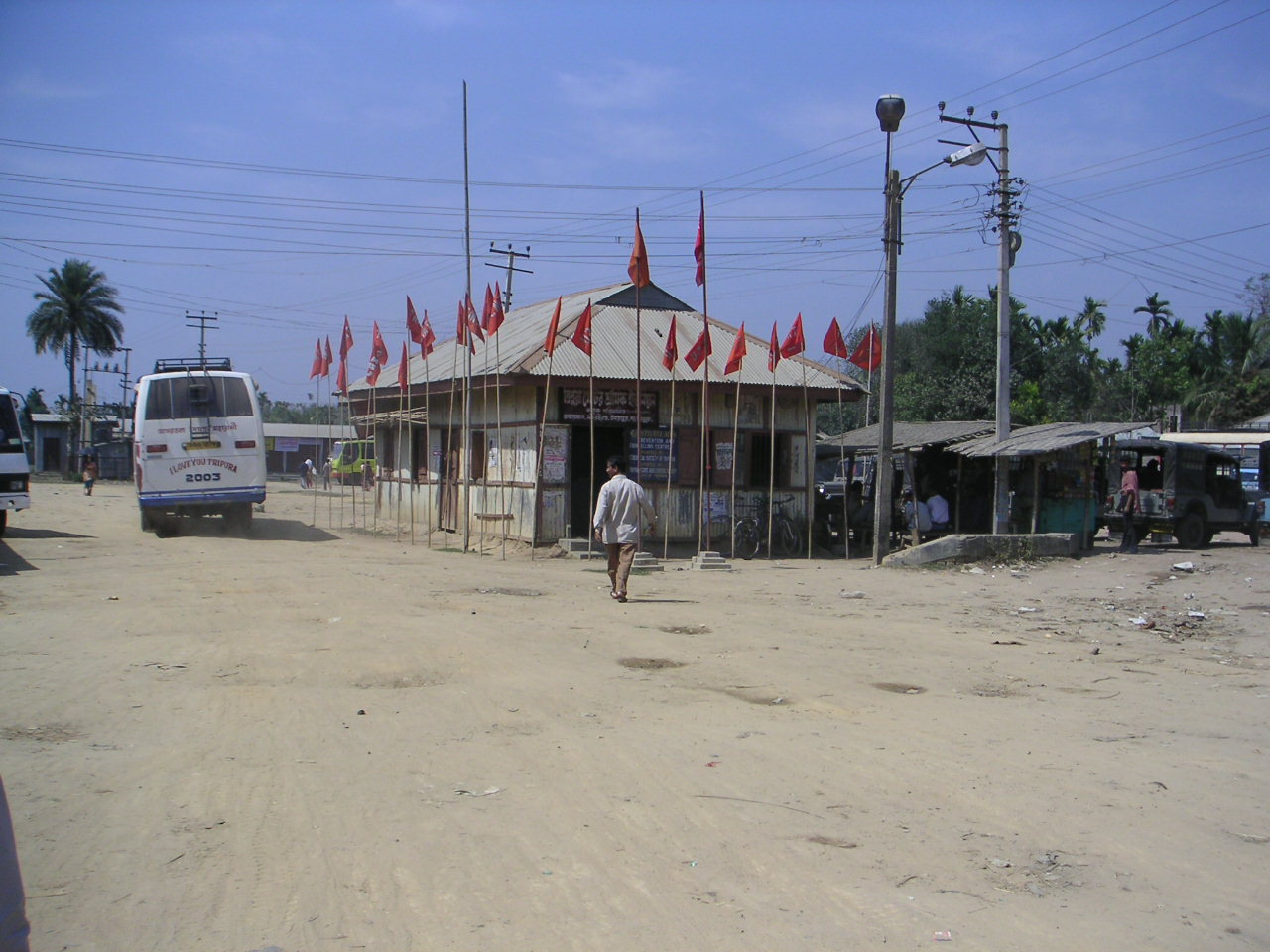
Udaipur bus stand

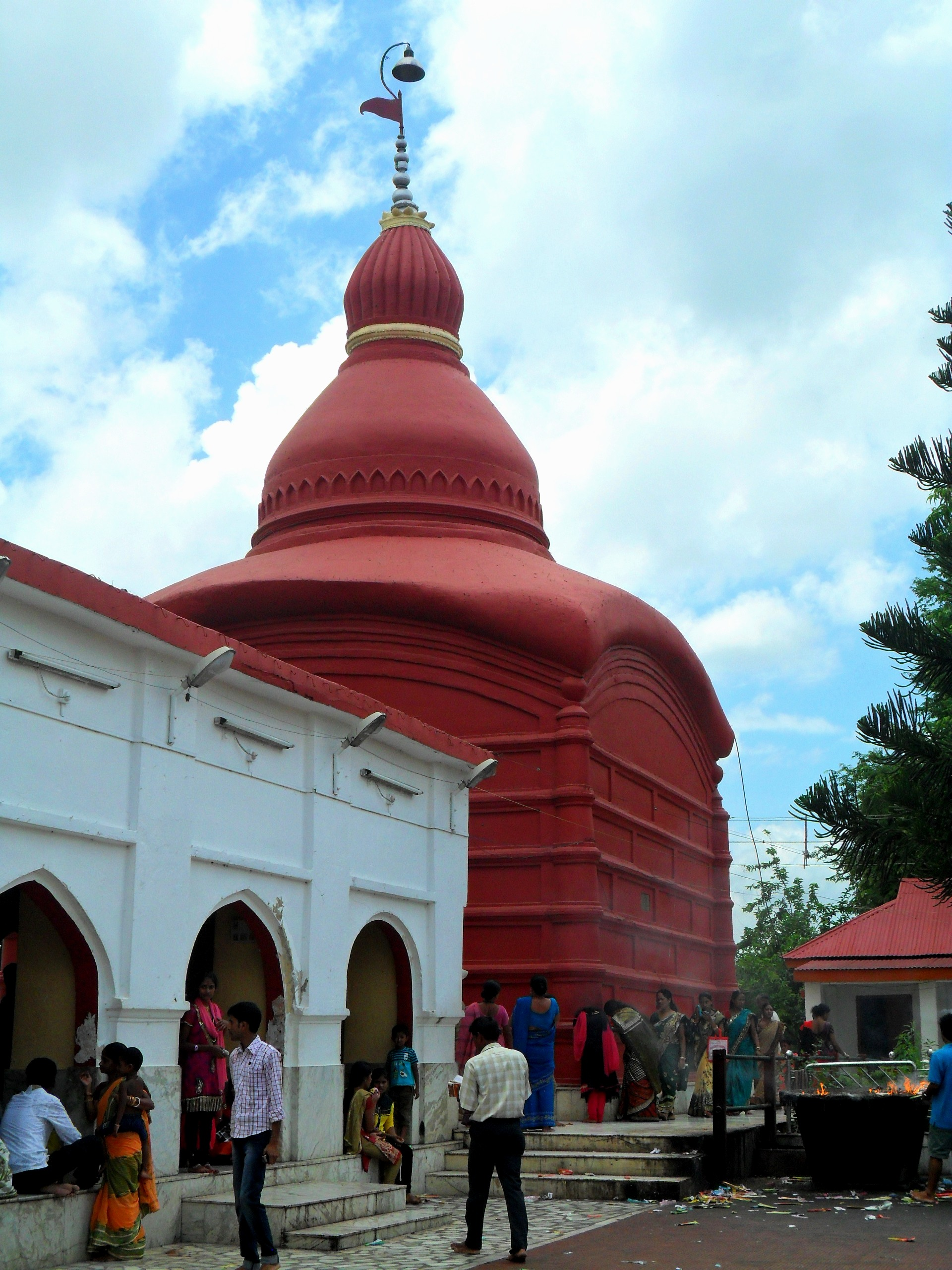
Tripura Sundari temple

== See also ==
- List of cities and towns in Tripura
