= Sabroom =

- Town
- Location within Tripura Location within India
- Coordinates: 23.00°N 91.73°E
- Country: India
- State: Tripura
- District: South Tripura

Government
  - Type: Nagar Panchayat
  - Body: Sabroom Nagar Panchayat
  - Chairman: Smt. Ruma Majumder (CPI(M))
- Elevation: 26 m (85 ft)

Population (2011)
  - Total: 7,134

Languages
  - Official: Bengali, Kokborok, English
- Time zone: UTC+5:30 (IST)
- Vehicle registration: TR-08
- Website: sabroomnp.tripura.gov.in

Sabroom is a town and a Nagar Panchayat in South Tripura district in the Indian state of Tripura. It is located on the banks of the Feni River, which separates India and Bangladesh. It is believed that during the Bangladesh War of Independence in 1971, Hindus migrated to Sabroom from Noakhali and Feni districts of Bangladesh.

== Geography ==
Sabroom is located at 23.00°N 91.73°E. It has an average elevation of 26 m (85 ft).

== Demographics ==
As of 2001 India census, Sabroom had a population of 5766. Males constitute 52% of the population and females 48%. Sabroom has an average literacy rate of 82%, higher than the national average of 59.5%: male literacy is 86%, and female literacy is 78%. In Sabroom, 11% of the population is under 6 years of age.

== Politics ==
Sabroom assembly constituency is part of Tripura East (Lok Sabha constituency).

== See also ==
- List of cities and towns in Tripura
