= Lumding railway division =

Railway division of India

Lumding railway division is one of the five railway divisions under the jurisdiction of Northeast Frontier Railway zone of the Indian Railways. This railway division was formed on 1 May 1969, with its headquarter located at Lumding in the state of Assam.

Katihar railway division, Alipurduar railway division, Tinsukia railway division and Rangiya railway division are the other four railway divisions under the NFR Zone headquartered at Maligaon, Guwahati.

== List of railway stations and towns ==
The list includes the stations under the Lumding railway division and their station category.

Category of station	No. of stations	Names of stations
A-1	1	Guwahati
A	7	Dimapur, Kamakhya Junction , Lumding Junction, Silchar, Agartala, Karimganj Junction, Badarpur Junction
B	-	-
C suburban station	-	-
D	-	New Guwahati
E	-	-
F halt station	-	-
Total	8	-

Note: - (dash) denotes 'Stations closed for Passengers'
