= Laopani railway station =

Railway station in Assam, India

Laopani

General information
- Location: Kampur-Chaparmukh Road, Niz-Jarabar, Nagaon district, Assam; India
- Coordinates: 26°12′01″N 92°35′46″E
- Elevation: 65 m (213 ft)
- System: Indian Railways station
- Owner: Indian Railways
- Operator: Northeast Frontier Railway
- Line: Guwahati–Lumding section
- Platforms: 2

Construction
- Structure type: Standard (on-ground station)

Other information
- Status: Operational
- Station code: LPN
- Zone(s): Northeast Frontier Railway
- Division(s): Lumding

History
- Electrified: Double Electric line
- Former names: Assam Bengal Railway

Services
Preceding station	Indian Railways	Following station
Chaparmukh Junction towards Guwahati	Northeast Frontier Railway zone Guwahati–Lumding section	Kampur towards Lumding
Location
- Location within Assam Location within India

Laopani railway station is a railway station located on the Guwahati–Lumding railway line operated by the Northeast Frontier Railway zone under Lumding railway division. It is situated beside Kampur-Chaparmukh Road at Niz-Jarabar in Nagaon district, in the Indian state of Assam.
