= Panbari railway station =

Railway station in Assam, India

Panbari

General information
- Location: Burha Mayang Par, Panbari, Kamrup Metropolitan district, Assam; India
- Coordinates: 26°13′36″N 91°57′05″E
- Elevation: 59 m (194 ft)
- System: Indian Railways station
- Owner: Indian Railways
- Operator: Northeast Frontier Railway
- Line: Guwahati–Lumding section
- Platforms: 2

Construction
- Structure type: Standard (on-ground station)

Other information
- Status: Operational
- Station code: PNB
- Zone(s): Northeast Frontier Railway
- Division(s): Lumding

History
- Electrified: Double Electric line
- Former names: Assam Bengal Railway

Services
| Preceding station | Indian Railways | Following station |
|---|---|---|
| Thakurkuchi towards Guwahati | Northeast Frontier Railway zone Guwahati–Lumding section | Digaru towards Lumding |
Location
- Location within Assam Location within India

Panbari railway station is a railway station located on the Guwahati–Lumding railway line operated by the Northeast Frontier Railway zone under Lumding railway division. It is situated at Burha Mayang Par, Panbari in Kamrup Metropolitan district, in the Indian state of Assam.
