= Madhab Than =

Hindu temple in India

- Assam

Religion
- Affiliation: Hinduism
- District: Nagaon
- Deity: Madhab(Sri Krishna), Shiva and Ganesh
- Festivals: Ashok-astomi mela, Rash, Janmanstami, Doll Yatra

Location
- Location: Kampur
- State: Assam
- Country: India
- Interactive map of Madhab Than
- Coordinates: 26.20°N 92.63°E

Architecture
- Temple: 4 (four)

Madhab Than is a pilgrim center dedicated to lord Krishna, one of the main Hindu deities. It is situated in Kampur of Nagaon District in the state of Assam, India.
