= Lanka railway station =

Railway station in Assam, India

Lanka

General information
- Location: Lanka, Hojai district, Assam; India
- Coordinates: 25°54′52″N 92°57′29″E
- Elevation: 87 m (285 ft)
- System: Indian Railways station
- Owner: Indian Railways
- Operator: Northeast Frontier Railway
- Line: Guwahati–Lumding section
- Platforms: 3

Construction
- Structure type: Standard (on-ground station)

Other information
- Status: Operational
- Station code: LKA
- Zone(s): Northeast Frontier Railway
- Division(s): Lumding

History
- Electrified: Double Electric line
- Former names: Assam Bengal Railway

Services
| Preceding station | Indian Railways | Following station |
|---|---|---|
| Dhalpukhuri towards Guwahati | Northeast Frontier Railway zone Guwahati–Lumding section | Habaipur towards Lumding |
Location
- Location within Assam Location within India

Lanka railway station is a railway station located on the Guwahati–Lumding railway line operated by the Northeast Frontier Railway zone under Lumding railway division. It is situated at Lanka in Hojai district, in the Indian state of Assam.
