= Kamalajari railway station =

Railway station in Assam, India

Kamalajari

General information
- Location: Sonapur Gaon, Kamrup rural district, Assam 782402 india
- Coordinates: 26°06′N 91°34′E
- Elevation: 57 m (187 ft)
- System: Indian Railways station Terminal station
- Owner: Indian Railways
- Operator: Northeast Frontier Railway
- Line: Tetelia-Byrnihat Railway Line
- Platforms: 1
- Tracks: 2

Construction
- Structure type: Terminus

Other information
- Status: under construction
- Station code: KMLJ
- Zone(s): Northeast Frontier Railway
- Division(s): Lumding

History
- Opened: 2023; 3 years ago
Location
- Location within Assam

Kamalajari Railway Station coded KMLJ is a railway station currently under construction in the Kamrup rural district of Assam, India. It is an important station on the Tetelia–Byrnihat Line of the Northeast Frontier Railway (NFR). The station is situated at an elevation of 57 metres (187 feet) above sea level.

== Current status ==
Teteliya–Byrnihat line, 22 km long, from Guwahati's suburb Tetelia to Byrnihat near Shillon in Meghalaya is likely to be completed by March 2025. From Byrnihat it will be extended further to Shillong in future. Construction was delayed after a 2017 protest in Ronghana.

== See also ==
- Tetelia-Byrnihat Railway Line
- Guwahati–Lumding section
- Shillong
