= HWX =

HWX may refer to:

- HWX, legacy switchgear product by Ferguson, Pailin & Co, England
- HWX, station code for Habaipur railway station, a railway station in India
- HWX, Toronto Stock Exchange symbol for Headwater Exploration Inc.
