= Thekeraguri railway station =

Railway station in Assam, India

Thekeraguri

General information
- Location: National Highway 37, Morakolong, Morigaon district, Assam; India
- Coordinates: 26°11′57″N 92°24′14″E
- Elevation: 62 m (203 ft)
- System: Indian Railways station
- Owner: Indian Railways
- Operator: Northeast Frontier Railway
- Line: Guwahati–Lumding section
- Platforms: 2

Construction
- Structure type: Standard (on-ground station)

Other information
- Status: Operational
- Station code: TGE
- Zone(s): Northeast Frontier Railway
- Division(s): Lumding

History
- Electrified: Double Electric line
- Former names: Assam Bengal Railway

Services
Preceding station	Indian Railways	Following station
Dharamtul towards Guwahati	Northeast Frontier Railway zone Guwahati–Lumding section	Chaparmukh Junction towards Lumding
Location
- Location within Assam Location within India

Thekeraguri railway station is a railway station located on the Guwahati–Lumding railway line operated by the Northeast Frontier Railway zone under Lumding railway division. It is situated beside National Highway 37 at Morakolong in Morigaon district, in the Indian state of Assam.
