= Pachia =

Pachia can refer to:

- Pachia (Anafi), island in the commune Anafi, Greece
- Pachia (Nisyros), island in the commune Nisyros, Greece
- Pachia, Covasna, village in Brateș, Covasna, Romania
- Pachia, Kamrup, village in Kamrup, Assam, India
- Pachía District in Tacna province, Peru

== See also ==
- Pacheia Ammos, village in municipality Ierapetra, Crete, Greece
