= Jamunamukh railway station =

Railway station in Assam, India

Jamunamukh

General information
- Location: Jamunamukh, Hojai district, Assam; India
- Coordinates: 26°06′29″N 92°44′29″E
- Elevation: 70 m (230 ft)
- System: Indian Railways station
- Owner: Indian Railways
- Operator: Northeast Frontier Railway
- Line: Guwahati–Lumding section
- Platforms: 1

Construction
- Structure type: Standard (on-ground station)

Other information
- Status: Operational
- Station code: JMK
- Zone(s): Northeast Frontier Railway
- Division(s): Lumding

History
- Electrified: Double Electric line
- Former names: Assam Bengal Railway

Services
Preceding station	Indian Railways	Following station
Kampur towards Guwahati	Northeast Frontier Railway zone Guwahati–Lumding section	Jugijan towards Lumding
Location
- Location within Assam Location within India

Jamunamukh railway station is a railway station located on the Guwahati–Lumding railway line operated by the Northeast Frontier Railway zone under Lumding railway division. It is situated at Jamunamukh town in Hojai district, in the Indian state of Assam.
