= Pathimari =

- Village
- Location in Assam, India Pathimari (India)
- Coordinates: 26.18°N 91.05°E
- Country: India
- State: Assam
- District: Kamrup

Government
  - Body: Gram panchayat

Languages
  - Official: Assamese
- Time zone: UTC+5:30 (IST)
- PIN: 781101
- Vehicle registration: AS
- Website: kamrup.nic.in

Pathimari is a village in Kamrup district, situated on the north bank of river Brahmaputra.

== Transport ==
Pathimari is accessible through National Highway 31. All major private commercial vehicles ply between Pathimari and nearby towns.

== See also ==
- Pijupara
- Pingaleswar
