= Tetelia–Byrnihat line =

Planned railway line in India

The Tetelia-Byrnihat Line is a planned railway project in Assam and Meghalaya, India, to improve connectivity and boost the region's economy.

== History ==
In the 19th century, the Cherra Companyganj State Railways had a station called Tharia in Meghalaya, connected to Companyganj in Bangladesh, but it closed after an earthquake damaged the line.

In the late 1970s, there was an attempt to build a railway from Guwahati to Byrnihat in Meghalaya, but local opposition stopped the project before any rails were laid.

== Railway in Meghalaya ==
=== Existing ===
- Mendipathar–Guwahati line, total 131 km long with 20 km in Meghalaya connects Meghalaya’s North Garo Hills to India's rail network, operational since 2014. (first rail line in Meghalaya).

=== Under-construction ===
- Tetelia-Shillong line is divided into two main phases:
  - Tetelia–Byrnihat line, 22 kilometers (14 miles) railway line from Tetelia Junction in Assam to Byrnihat in Meghalaya, project was on hold for a long time because local groups had been protesting against illegal immigration. Despite these challenges, 10 kilometers of the Tetelia–Kamalajari section have been completed. Teteliya-Kamalajari (10.15 km) operation in May 2025 but Kamalajari-Byrnihat (11.35 km) completion deadline officially not yet set as of May 2025 as work was stopped by Khasi Student Union in 2017 and remains stopped since then, however 85% complete in March 2025 with speculative target completion by 2026.
  - Byrnihat-Shillong line: 108 kilometers (67 miles) from Byrnihat to Shillong, the capital of Meghalaya, with 100 bridges with the longest being 701 meters, 10 stations enroute (Byrnihat, Sohkhwai, Lailad, Umsong, Umar, Nongsder, Kyrdemkulai, Umroi, Umpling, and New Shillong), 31 tunnels totaling 39.06 kilometers making up 36.03 percent of the rail's length with longest tunnel 4.14 kilometers long. As of May 2025, Khasi Student Union has caused problem and stopped work since 2017 while DC and CM have taken no action despite repeated reminders, and Khasi Hills Autonomous District Council has not handover the land to railway despite receiving Rs 209.37 crore in 2017, even though DPR was ready in 2024 and construction may begin in 2026 only if troublemakers make way.

- Shillong–Tura line, ₹18,000 crore 220 km long via Nongstoin to Tura in West Garo Hills with 30+ tunnels in Garo Hills, feasibility study was completed in 2025 but awaiting funding approach for construction.

- Dawki–Jowai line, 50 km link within West Jaintia Hills district from Dawki land port to Jowai near Bangladesh–India border is proposed in "Northeast Vision 2040" but has not been surveyed yet as of 2025.

=== Proposed ===
- Mawlynnong–Cherrapunji line, ~25 km link from Mawlynnong to Cherrapunji via scenic route through East Khasi Hills was proposed in 2023 for tourism was, but no formal study has been conducted as of 2025.

- Nongstoin–Mahendraganj line, ~25 km link from Nongstoin to Mahendraganj in Mgahlaya on Bangladesh Border as potential Trans-Asian Railway (TAR) spur.

== See also ==
- North Eastern Railway Connectivity Project

== See also ==
- North Eastern Railway Connectivity Project
