= Mendipathar railway station =

Railway station in Meghalaya, India

Mendipathar

General information
- Location: Dilma Rd, Mendipathar, North garo hills district, Meghalaya; India
- Coordinates: 25°53′40″N 90°35′59″E
- Elevation: 916 m (3,005 ft)
- System: Indian Railways station Terminal station
- Owner: Indian Railways
- Operator: Northeast Frontier Railway
- Line: Dudhnoi–Mendipathar line
- Platforms: 1
- Tracks: 2

Construction
- Structure type: Terminus

Other information
- Status: Functioning
- Station code: MNDP
- Zone(s): Northeast Frontier Railway
- Division(s): Rangiya

History
- Opened: 2012; 14 years ago
Location
- Location within Meghalaya

Mendipathar railway station is a railway station located in Resubelpara Municipal Board Jurisdiction, Meghalaya, India.

== History ==
Government has considered the technical feasibility of linking Shillong and Gauhati by monorail or narrow-gauge surface railway track as suggested by Mr. George Gilfellon for improved communication between these two places. The note drawn out by Mr. Gilfellon was incomplete as no cogent reasons nor any figures of cost had been given. Besides, even in foreign countries, monorail is being developed mainly for urban and suburban traffic and is not intended for cross-country traffic. Therefore, the question of its adoption in the hilly area to link Shillong and Gauhati does not arise. There is no proposal, at present, to link Gauhati with Shillong by a narrow gauge line.

A line between Dudhnoi and Depa, Meghalaya through Dudhnoi river valley was proposed in rail budget 1992–93. Later alignment was changed to Dudhnoi–Mendipathar in 2007 due to opposition of local people. Due to late handling of land to railways in Assam and Meghalaya, the work was slow up to 2013. Acquisition of land was completed by March 2013.

== Current status ==
It currently is the first and only railway station in Meghalaya, a hilly state. The train station was inaugurated by the prime minister of India, Narendra Modi, on 30 November 2014, through a video feed to the ceremony gathering at Mendipathar. Mendipathar–Guwahati Passenger is the only train from the station.

The second rail project for Meghalaya, Tetelia–Byrnihat Line, 22 km long, from Guwahati's suburb Tetelia to Byrnihat in Meghalaya is likely to be completed by March 2022. From Byrnihat it will be extended further to Shillong in future. Construction was delayed after a 2017 protest in Ronghana.

== Trains ==
- Mendipathar–Guwahati Passenger
