= Songmegap =

Village in Meghalaya, India

Coordinates: 25.894°N 90.581°E

Songmegap village is located near Resubelpara Tehsil of North Garo Hills district (earlier East Garo Hills district) in Meghalaya in India.
