= Pelagirhabdus alkalitolerans =

Scientific classification
- Domain: Bacteria
- Kingdom: Bacillati
- Phylum: Bacillota
- Class: Bacilli
- Order: Bacillales
- Family: Bacillaceae
- Genus: Pelagirhabdus
- Species: P. alkalitolerans

Binomial name
- Pelagirhabdus alkalitolerans Sultanpuram et al. 2016

Type strain
- CGMCC 1.15177, KCTC 33632, S5

Species of bacterium

Pelagirhabdus alkalitolerans is a Gram-positive, alkalitolerant, rod-shaped and non-motile bacterium from the genus of Pelagirhabdus which has been isolated from the beach of Pingaleswar in India.
