= Thakurkuchi railway station =

Railway station in Assam, India

Thakurkuchi

General information
- Location: Chandrapur Road, Hatisila, Thakurkuchi, Kamrup Metropolitan district, Assam; India
- Coordinates: 26°14′02″N 91°55′20″E
- Elevation: 54 m (177 ft)
- System: Indian Railways station
- Owner: Indian Railways
- Operator: Northeast Frontier Railway
- Line: Guwahati–Lumding section
- Platforms: 2

Construction
- Structure type: Standard (on-ground station)

Other information
- Status: Operational
- Station code: TKC
- Zone(s): Northeast Frontier Railway
- Division(s): Lumding

History
- Electrified: Double Electric line
- Former names: Assam Bengal Railway

Services
Preceding station	Indian Railways	Following station
Panikhaiti towards Guwahati	Northeast Frontier Railway zone Guwahati–Lumding section	Panbari towards Lumding
Location
- Location within Assam Location within India

Thakurkuchi railway station is a railway station located on the Guwahati–Lumding railway line operated by the Northeast Frontier Railway zone under Lumding railway division. It is situated beside Chandrapur Road at Hatisila, Thakurkuchi in Kamrup Metropolitan district, in the Indian state of Assam.
