= Nolbari railway station =

Railway station in Meghalaya, India

Nolbari

General information
- Location: Mendi–Damra Road, Goalpara district, Assam; India
- Coordinates: 25.9528°N 90.7116°E
- Elevation: 85 metres (279 ft)
- System: Indian Railways station
- Owner: Indian Railways
- Operator: Northeast Frontier
- Platforms: 1
- Tracks: 2
- Connections: Auto stand

Construction
- Structure type: Standard (on-ground station)
- Parking: Yes
- Cycle facilities: Yes

Other information
- Status: Single diesel line
- Station code: NOLB
- Zone(s): Northeast Frontier
- Division(s): Rangiya
Location

Nolbari railway station is a small railway station in Goalpara district, Assam, India. Its code is NOLB. It serves Dudhnoi town. The station consists of a single platform. The platform is not well sheltered. It lacks many facilities including water and sanitation.

== Major trains ==
- 55681/55682 Mendipathar–Guwahati Passenger
