= Natun Jharobari =

- Village
- Location in Assam, India Natun Jharobari (India)
- Coordinates: 26.25°N 91.67°E
- Country: India
- State: Assam
- District: Kamrup

Languages
  - Official: Assamese
- Time zone: UTC+5:30 (IST)
- PIN: 781124
- Vehicle registration: AS
- Website: kamrup.nic.in

Natun Jharobari is a village in Kamrup, situated in north bank of river Brahmaputra.

== Transport ==
Natun Jharobari is accessible through National Highway 31. All major private commercial vehicles ply between Natun Jharobari and nearby towns.

== See also ==
- Paneri
- Nartap
