= Pelagirhabdus =

Scientific classification
- Domain: Bacteria
- Kingdom: Bacillati
- Phylum: Bacillota
- Class: Bacilli
- Order: Bacillales
- Family: Bacillaceae
- Genus: Pelagirhabdus; Sultanpuram et al. 2016

Type species
- Pelagirhabdus alkalitolerans Sultanpuram et al. 2016

Species
- P. alkalitolerans; P. fermentum

Genus of bacteria

Pelagirhabdus is a genus of bacteria from the family of Bacillaceae.

== Phylogeny ==
The currently accepted taxonomy is based on the List of Prokaryotic names with Standing in Nomenclature (LPSN) and National Center for Biotechnology Information (NCBI).

16S rRNA based LTP_10_2024

- Pelagirhabdus
  - P. alkalitolerans Sultanpuram et al. 2016
  - P. fermentum (Zhilina et al. 2002) Sultanpuram et al. 2016

120 marker proteins based GTDB 09-RS220

- Pelagirhabdus
  Pelagirhabdus alkalitolerans

== See also ==
- List of Bacteria genera
- List of bacterial orders
