= Byrnihat =

Industrial town in Meghalaya, India

- Industrial town
- Location in Meghalaya, India Byrnihat (India)
- Coordinates: 26°3′9″N 91°52′12″E
- Country: India
- State: Meghalaya
- District: Ri-Bhoi
- Block: Umling

Languages
  - Official: Khasi
  - Regional: Bhoi dialect
- Time zone: UTC+5:30 (IST)
- PIN: 793101
- Village Code: 277492

Byrnihat is a town in the Ri-Bhoi district of Meghalaya, India, located on the Meghalaya–Assam border. It is an industrial town, with an economy mostly supported by iron and steel manufacturing. It was ranked as the most polluted city in India in 2023 by the Centre for Research on Energy and Clean Air, and as the most polluted city in the world in 2024 by IQAir. Its groundwater has also been found to be contaminated.

This pollution has been blamed on several factors, including industrial pollution. A national highway passes through Byrnihat; emissions from vehicles traveling on this highway have also been blamed for the pollution.

The site has served as a border checkpoint multiple times in its history. Railway lines connecting the town with Assam have been planned or proposed multiple times, but have received firm opposition.

== History ==
Byrnihat was a border checkpoint between Meghalaya and Assam as of 1986. Alternative agricultural practices were researched here from 1975 to 1983 to find a viable alternative to shifting cultivation. The Indian Express reported in 1992 that according to a case study, 21 plant species had become endangered in the town due to the practice.

During the beginning of the COVID-19 pandemic, Byrnihat was designated as one of the entry points for transportation of goods from Assam into Meghalaya, to prevent the spread of COVID from Assam to Meghalaya. In July 2020, the government of Meghalaya moved the entry point at the town to another location, after facing pressure from the government of Assam. Industries based in the Byrnihat industrial area were discovered in April 2021 to have engaged in power theft. A health centre was set up in the town in June of the year to serve Ri-Bhoi district residents with mild COVID cases. Byrnihat experienced heavy rains in May 2022.

It was proposed in 2024 that over 54 ha (134 acres) of forest land at Byrnihat be converted to a new industrial estate, which has raised concerns about the project's environmental impact. The Chief Minister of Meghalaya, Conrad Sangma, stated that the land is not a recorded forest land and that the proposal will only move forward if the locals are comfortable with it. The Assam-based Hindu organization Kutumba Surakshya Parishad scheduled protests against the banning of Hindu rituals in the Mawjymbuin Cave on 24 December of the year, one of them allegedly including blocking the Meghalaya-Assam Highway in the Byrnihat area. These were banned by the administration of the Ri-Bhoi district to maintain tranquility before Christmas celebrations.

== Geography ==
Byrnihat is located at a low altitude, between 66 and 100 metres above sea level. It has a tropical climate, with an average minimum and maximum temperature of 17.5 °C and 28 °C, respectively. It has a high annual temperature compared to Shillong. The average rainfall in Byrnihat was 212 mm, as of 1992. The Byrnihat area has hilly terrain. The town's geography affects the kinds of products sold in its weekly market.

The town is in the Umling block of the Ri-Bhoi district, in Meghalaya. It is located on the Guwuhati-Shillong roadways (GS road). It is 90 km away from Shillong and 14 km away from Guwahati.

== Demographics ==
Population over time, according to census
Year	Pop.	±%
2001	538	—
2011	298	−44.6%

According to the Meghalaya State Pollution Control Board (MSPCB), the population of Byrnihat and its adjacent villages was 5,444 in 2011. The Pollution Control Board of Assam stated in 2020 that the town has a population of 10,000. Deutsche Welle stated in 2025 that it has a population of 50,000. The Byrnihat region is populated by Khasi people who speak the Bhoi dialect of the Khasi language. Residents of Byrnihat are familiar with the Assamese, Bengali, Nepalese and Mikir languages.

== Economy ==
Byrnihat is an industrial town. It developed into an industrial hub during the late 1990s. The town hosts an industrial estate called the Export Promotion Industrial Park, (Note: Although the cited BBC article calls it an "Export Promotion Industrial Project", all other sources call it an "Export Promotion Industrial Park".^{Examples include:}) built by the government. The estate is located adjacent to the Umtrew river and spans 256 acres as of 2024. It provides firms that settle in the industrial zone with financial incentives such as subsidies and tax holidays, to attract investors into the region. The estate lies partially in Meghalaya and partially in Assam. Byrnihat has about 80 industries as of 2025. After Byrnihat ranked highly atop pollution charts, pollution control boards opted to close coke plants, leaving some residents unemployed.

A Bamboo Technology Park has been built in the town by the North East Cane and Bamboo Development Council. Betel nuts and betel leaves are major crops in Byrnihat.

Byrnihat has a weekly market which operates every Friday. Consumers in the markets of Byrnihat and the nearby Guwahati avoid agricultural produce from the Meghalayan town.

== Pollution ==
Pollution is a major problem in Byrnihat. In 2024, the Centre for Research on Energy and Clean Air (CREA), a non-profit think tank, reported that Byrnihat was India's most polluted city in 2023, having an annual average PM10 concentration of 301 micrograms per cubic metre. In 2025, IQAir, a Swiss air technology company, ranked the town as the most polluted city in the world in 2024, with a PM2.5 concentration of 128.2 μg/m³ that year. In 2026, CREA again ranked Byrnihat as the most polluted city in India in 2025, based on PM2.5 concentration. Its particulate matter concentration surpassed places more well known for pollution problems, such as Delhi, in all three years. The National Clean Air Programme includes Byrnihat in its list of non-attainment cities, a list of the most polluted cities of India. Its air pollution has reportedly caused health problems such as respiratory issues, eye irritation, skin rashes, tuberculosis, and cancer. The pollution has also been reported to damage crops and water sources. The number of respiratory infection cases in the region rose by 76.8% from 2022 to 2024, from 2,082 to 3,681. The town's groundwater is contaminated with heavy metals, such as cadmium, chromium, and lead, at levels which exceed limits set by the Bureau of Indian Standards and the World Health Organization, according to two 2024 studies. The Umtrew river, Byrnihat's main water source, is polluted by effluent.

Byrnihat's pollution has been attributed to the industrial activities in the area, emissions of vehicles moving through the Meghalaya-Assam border, construction, mining, the use of wood as a fuel, burning of solid waste, and resuspension of road dust. The town has been said to have a bowl-shaped topography which prevents pollutants from leaving the area. The Byrnihat Industries Association has contested the culpability of Byrnihat's industries in pollution of the town.

After the Central Pollution Control Board recorded Byrnihat as the most polluted settlement in India on 25 October 2023, with an Air Quality Index of 302, the Deputy Chief Minister of Meghalaya, Prestone Tynsong, stated that Byrnihat's factories are "well monitored by the MSPCB" and are fewer in number compared to the part of Assam bordering Byrnihat. After IQAir's report was released in 2025, the Chief Minister of Meghalaya, Conrad Sangma, challenged IQAir's report by saying that the MSPCB found Byrnihat's PM2.5 concentration in 2024 to be 50.1 μg/m³. He also stated that Assam's part of the Byrnihat area may be a major contributor to the pollution, as it has 20 industries with a high pollution potential, while Byrnihat has only 5. He called for a join effort between Assam and Meghalaya on the issue. The chairman of the MSPCB, R. Nainamalai, stated in January 2026 that pollution levels in the Meghalayan part of Byrnihat have dropped to moderate after the shuttering of several red category units.

In February 2022, factories at the Export Promotion Industrial Park were inspected by local authorities following pollution complaints by locals. The MSPCB inspected ten industrial units in the town on 3 September 2024, six of which were found to not comply with pollution regulations and were issued closure notices. Six other units were shut down for failure to comply with environmental norms after inspections in January 2025, but this did not result in a significant change in air quality. As of February 2026, fifteen industrial units have been closed on the Assam side of the Byrnihat area since the town was placed atop pollution rankings.

== Transportation ==
=== Rail ===
Planned railway projects that go to Byrnihat include the Tetelia–Byrnihat line and the Byrnihat–Shillong line. These lines have faced much opposition in Meghalaya from various groups, especially the Khasi Students Union (KSU), (Note: Karlsson (2011): "...the project has not been able to take off because of opposition, mainly from the KSU ...") (Note: Other groups that oppose the railway projects include the Jaintia Students Union and the Hynñiewtrep Integrated Territorial Organisation.) due to the fear that it would bring "outsiders" (Note: or "illegal immigrants") into Meghalaya and turn the indigenous communities into minorities. A line that goes from Azara in Assam to Byrnihat had also been proposed, but was replaced by the Tetelia–Byrnihat line. In the 1980s, proposals to establish a railhead at Byrnihat were shelved due to protests by the KSU and arguments by the opposition in the Meghalayan parliament.

=== Road ===
National Highway 6 passes through the town.
