= Panikhaiti =

- Village
- Location in Assam, India Panikhaiti (India)
- Coordinates: 26.22°N 91.88°E
- Country: India
- State: Assam
- District: Kamrup Metropolitan district

Government
  - Body: Gram panchayat

Languages
  - Official: Assamese
- Time zone: UTC+5:30 (IST)
- PIN: 781026
- Vehicle registration: AS
- Website: kamrup.nic.in

Panikhaiti is a village in Kamrup Metropolitan district,Guwahati situated on the south bank of the Brahmaputra River.

== Transport ==
Panikhaiti is accessible through National Highway 37. All major private commercial vehicles ply between Panikhaiti and Guwahati. Panikhaiti railway station is located on Guwahati–Lumding section.

== See also ==
- Palahartari
- Paneri
