= Pijupara =

- Village
- Location in Assam, India Pijupara (India)
- Coordinates: 26.08°N 91.56°E
- Country: India
- State: Assam
- District: Kamrup

Government
  - Body: Gram panchayat

Languages
  - Official: Assamese
- Time zone: UTC+5:30 (IST)
- PIN: 781101
- Vehicle registration: AS
- Website: kamrup.nic.in

Pijupara is a village in Kamrup district, situated in northern bank of river Brahmaputra.

== Transport ==
Pijupara is accessible through National Highway 31. All major private commercial vehicles ply between Pubborka and nearby towns.

== See also ==
- Pathimari
- Pitambarhat Bazali
