= Pachia, Kamrup =

Pachia
- Village
- Location in Assam, India Pachia (India)
- Coordinates: 26.22°N 91.70°E
- Country: India
- State: Assam
- District: Kamrup

Government
  - Body: Gram panchayat

Languages
  - Official: Assamese
- Time zone: UTC+5:30 (IST)
- PIN: 781133
- Vehicle registration: AS
- Website: kamrup.nic.in

Pachia is a village in Kamrup, situated on the north bank of the river Brahmaputra.

== Transport ==
Pachia is accessible through National Highway 31. All major private commercial vehicles ply between Pachia and nearby towns.

== See also ==
- Pachim Dhuligaon
- Nizmanakuchi
