= Dudhnoi railway station =

Railway station in Assam, India

Dudhnoi Junction Railway Station

General information
- Location: Dudhnoi, Goalpara district, Assam; India
- Coordinates: 26.0015°N 90.7619°E
- Elevation: 50 metres (160 ft)
- System: Indian Railways station
- Owner: Indian Railways
- Operator: Northeast Frontier
- Platforms: 2
- Tracks: 4
- Connections: Auto stand

Construction
- Structure type: At grade
- Parking: Yes
- Cycle facilities: Yes

Other information
- Status: Electric-Line Doubling
- Station code: DDNI
- Zone(s): Northeast Frontier
- Division(s): Rangiya
Location
- Location within Assam Location within India

Dudhnoi Junction Railway Station is a Junction railway station in Goalpara district, Assam. Its code is DDNI. It is situated in a village area namely Mandalgram (approximately 2 km from Dudhnoi town). It serves the passengers from several small villages around Dudhnoi town. The station consists of a two platform. The platforms are well sheltered. It lacks many facilities including water and sanitation.

== History ==
The line between Dudhnoi in Assam and Deepa in Meghalaya was proposed in Rail budget 1992–93. Later alignment was changed to Dudhnoi-Mendipathar in 2007 due to opposition of local people. Due to late handling of land to railways in Assam and Meghalaya, the work was slow up to 2013. Acquisition of land was completed by March 2013.

This rail line is the first and only railway station in Meghalaya, a hilly state. Mendipathar railway station was inaugurated by the Prime minister of India, Narendra Modi on 30 November 2014, through a video feed to the ceremony gathering at Mendipathar, making it a Junction station.

== Major trains ==
- 15673/15674 Charlapalli–Kamakhya Amrit Bharat Express
- 55681/55682 Mendipathar–Guwahati Passenger
- 55811/55812 Dhubri–Kamakhya Passenger
- 75723/75724 New Bongaigaon–Guwahati DEMU
- 55803/55804 New Bongaigaon–Guwahati Passenger
