= Pelagirhabdus fermentum =

Pelagirhabdus alkalitolerans

Scientific classification
- Domain: Bacteria
- Kingdom: Bacillati
- Phylum: Bacillota
- Class: Bacilli
- Order: Bacillales
- Family: Bacillaceae
- Genus: Pelagirhabdus
- Species: P. fermentum

Binomial name
- Pelagirhabdus fermentum (Zhilina et al. 2002) Sultanpuram et al. 2016

Type strain
- DSM 13869, UNIQEM 210, Z-7984

Synonyms
- Amphibacillus fermentum

Species of bacterium

Pelagirhabdus fermentum is a bacterium from the genus of Pelagirhabdus which has been isolated from sediments from the Lake Magadi in Kenya.
