= New Bongaigaon–Guwahati section =

Railway Line in Assam, India

New Bongaigaon–Guwahati section (including Dudhnoi-Mendipathar branch line)
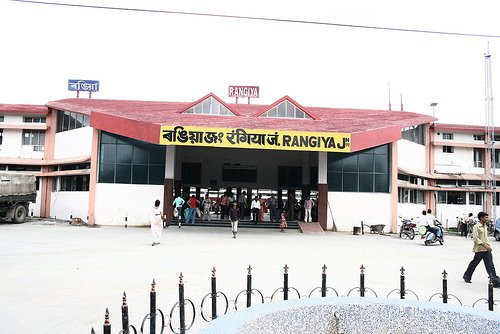
- Rangiya Junction an important railway station on New Bongaigaon–Guwahati section

Overview
- Status: Operational
- Owner: Indian Railways
- Locale: Assam
- Termini: New Bongaigaon; Guwahati
- Stations: 24

Service
- Operator: Northeast Frontier Railway

History
- Opened: 1962

Technical
- Line length: 157.8 km (98 mi)(via Rangiya) & 182.7 km (114 mi)(via Goalpara)
- Track gauge: 5 ft 6 in (1,676 mm) broad gauge
- Electrification: Yes
- Operating speed: 110 km/h (68 mph)

The New Bongaigaon–Guwahati section of the Barauni–Guwahati line connects New Bongaigaon and Guwahati in the Indian state of Assam.

== History ==
=== Early developments within Assam ===
The Assam Railway and Trading Company played a pioneering role in laying railway tracks in Assam. The Assam Railway and Trading Company Limited was incorporated in 1881. The first metre-gauge locomotive was put into service in Assam in 1882. The 64-kilometre (40 mi)-long line from Dibrugarh steamer ghat to Makum was opened to passenger traffic on 16 July 1883. The objective of opening an isolated railway in upper Assam was to link the tea gardens and coalfields to the steamer ghats. In the latter part of the 19th century, the Dibru–Sadiya railway was 149-kilometre (93 mi) long.The 1,000 mm (3 ft 3+3/8 in)-wide metre-gauge railway track earlier laid by Assam Bengal Railway from Chittagong to Lumding was extended to Tinsukia on the Dibru–Sadiya line in 1903.

=== Assam links pre-independence ===
During British rule, rail links from Assam to the rest of India were through the eastern part of Bengal. In pre-independence days, there were basically two linkages. On the western side, a metre gauge line running via Radhikapur, Biral, Parbatipur, Tista, Gitaldaha and Golokganj connected Fakiragram in Assam with Katihar in Bihar. On the eastern side, Assam was linked to Chittagong through the Akhaura–Kulaura–Chhatak line and Akhaura–Laksam–Chittagong line. Assam was linked to numerous other towns in the eastern part of Bengal through what is now the Mahisasan-Shahbajpur defunct transit point. The eastern line had been constructed in response to the demand of the Assam tea planters for a railway link to Chittagong port. Assam Bengal Railway started construction of a railway track on the eastern side of Bengal in 1891. A 150 kilometres (93 mi) track between Chittagong and Comilla was opened to traffic in 1895. The Comilla-Akhaura-Kulaura-Badarpur section was opened in 1896-1898 and finally extended to Lumding in 1903. The Assam Bengal Railway constructed a branch line to Guwahati, connecting the city to the eastern line in 1900. Apart from the eastern and western lines, there was another link. In 1908, Eastern Bengal Railway extended the Kaunia–Dharlla line to Amingaon. During the 1900–1910 period, the Eastern Bengal Railway built the Golakganj-Amingaon branch line, thus connecting the western bank of the Brahmaputra to the western line. In 1904, The Mariani–Furkating line wa made & it was operated by Jorhat-Provincial Railway. In 1937, the British also planned Guwahati-Dhaka line in Meter Gauge which was slated to connect Guwahati with Dewanganj Upazila(Bangladesh) as Dewangaunge was already connected with Dhaka via Mymensingh by a 259-kilometre (161 mi) long Meter Gauge line. The 323-kilometre (201 mi) long Railway Guwahati-Dewanganj project was scrapped in 1943-1947 period owing to Second World War, Indian National Army defeating the British & partition of India.

=== Assam Link Project ===
With the partition of India in 1947 & Independence, all the three links were lost and for a short period the railway system in Assam was delinked from the rest of India. Indian Railways took up the Assam Link Project in 1948 to build a rail link between Fakiragram and Kishanganj. Assam was connected with India through the newly laid Kishanganj-Fakirgram Railway line. The 300.1 kilometres (186.5 mi) Meter Gauge line was completed in 1950 under General Karnail Singh & General Kodandera Subayya Thimayya (Gen. KS Thimayya) of Indian Army.. The New Bongaigaon–Guwahati section was converted to 5 ft 6 in (1,676 mm) broad gauge. Broad gauge reached Guwahati in 1984.

=== Saraighat Bridge ===
The construction of the 1.49 km long Saraighat Bridge, the first rail-cum-road bridge across the Brahmaputra, was an event of great excitement. Jawaharlal Nehru, India’s first prime minister formally laid the foundation stone on 10 January 1960 and it was completed in 1962, connecting the two parts of the metre gauge railways in Assam.

=== Siliguri-Jogihopa-Kamakhya line ===
The 265 km (165 mi) long 5 ft 6 in (1,676 mm) broad gauge Siliguri-Jogihopa line was constructed between 1963 and 1965. The Naranarayan Setu was constructed in 1998, thereby paving the way for linking Jogihopa with Kamakhya.

=== Dudhnoi-Mendipathar branch line ===
The line between Dudhnoi in Assam and Deepa in Meghalaya was proposed in the Rail budget of 1992–93. Later the alignment was changed to Dudhnoi-Mendipathar in 2007 due to opposition of local people. Due to late handover of land to railways in Assam and Meghalaya, the progress of work was slow up to 2013. Acquisition of land was completed by March 2013.

This rail line is the first foray of Indian Railways into Meghalaya. Mendipathar railway station was inaugurated by the Prime minister of India, Narendra Modi on 30 November 2014, through a video feed to the ceremony gathering at Mendipathar.

== Electrification ==
Electrification of the entire Katihar–Guwahati route is planned to be executed by 2014. As on 2026, It is complete and fully operational.

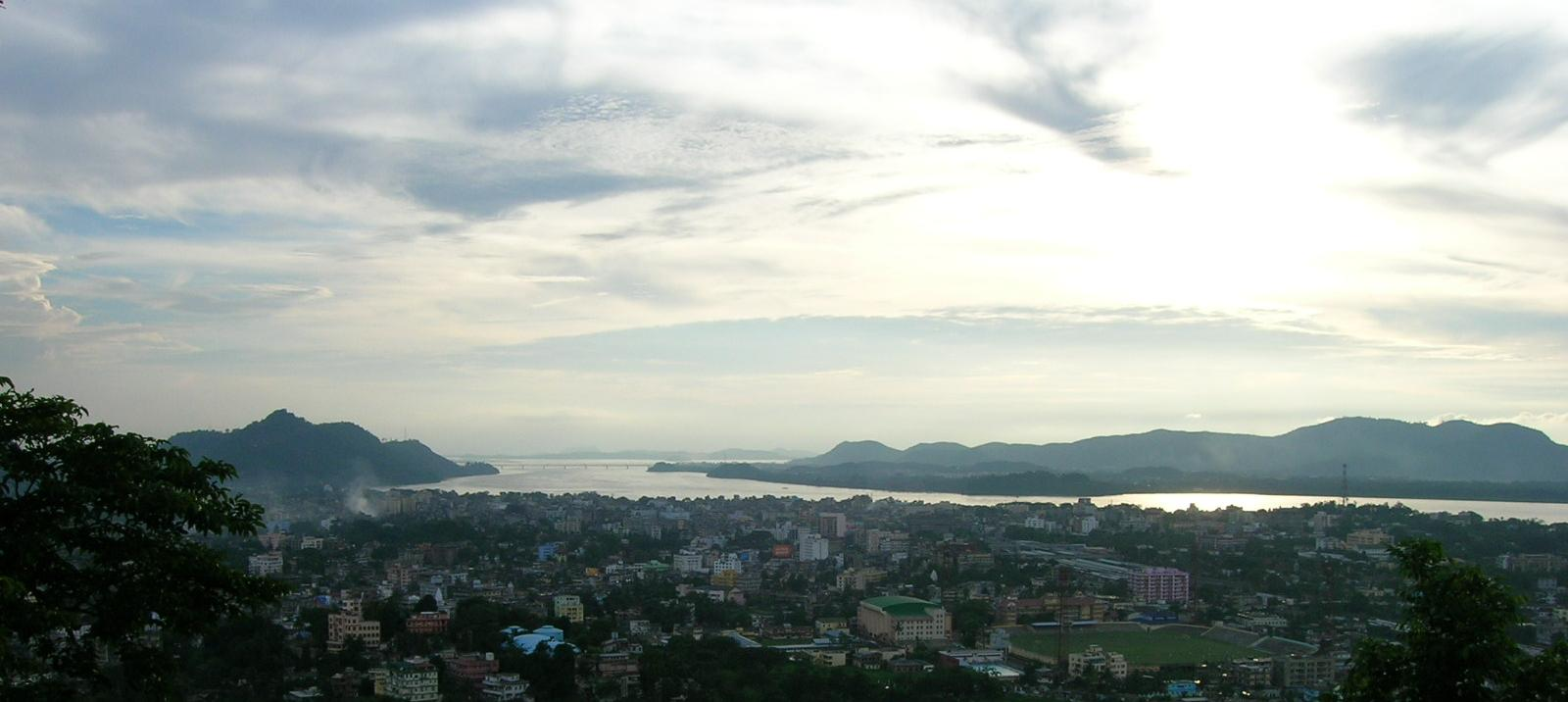
View of the Brahmaputra valley from the Sarania Hills. The Saraighat Bridge can be seen near the horizon, the peaked Kamakhya Hills are to the left, and while Guwahati is on the left bank, on the right bank is North Guwahati. The Nehru stadium and the railway station are faintly visible, right bottom.
