= Pachim Dhuligaon =

- Village
- Location in Assam, India Pachim Dhuligaon (India)
- Coordinates: 26.24°N 91.69°E
- Country: India
- State: Assam
- District: Kamrup

Languages
  - Official: Assamese
- Time zone: UTC+5:30 (IST)
- PIN: 781124
- Vehicle registration: AS
- Website: kamrup.nic.in

Pachim Dhuligaon is a village in Kamrup, situated in north bank of river Brahmaputra.

== Transport ==
Pachim Dhuligaon is accessible through National Highway 31. All major private commercial vehicles ply between Pachim Dhuligaon and nearby towns.

== See also ==
- Pachia
- Pacharia
