= Mendipathar–Guwahati Passenger =

Train in India

Overview
- Service type: Passenger
- Locale: Meghalaya and Assam
- Current operator: Northeast Frontier Railway

Route
- Termini: Mendipathar (MNDP); Guwahati (GHY)
- Stops: 12
- Distance travelled: 129 km (80 mi)
- Average journey time: 4 h 40 min
- Service frequency: Daily
- Train number: 55819/55820

On-board services
- Class: Unreserved
- Seating arrangements: Yes
- Sleeping arrangements: No
- Catering facilities: No
- Observation facilities: ICF coach
- Entertainment facilities: No
- Baggage facilities: Below the seats

Technical
- Rolling stock: 2
- Track gauge: 5 ft 6 in (1,676 mm)
- Electrification: No
- Operating speed: 28 km/h (17 mph) average with halts

Mendipathar–Guwahati Passenger is a passenger train belonging to Northeast Frontier Railway zone of Indian Railways that runs between Mendipathar of Meghalaya and Guwahati in Assam. It is currently being operated with 55819/55820 train numbers on a daily basis.

== Service ==
The 55819/Mendipathar–Guwahati Passenger has an average speed of 29 km/h and covers 129 km in 4 hrs 30 mins. 55820/Guwahati–Mendipathar Passenger has an average speed of 34 km/h and 129 km in 3 hrs 45 mins.

== Route and halts ==
- Mendipathar
- Nolbari
- Dudhnoi
- Amjonga
- Rangjuli
- Dhup Dhara
- Singra
- Boko
- Bamuni Gaon
- Chaygaon
- Mirza
- Azara
- Kamakhya Junction
- Guwahati

== Traction ==
Both trains are hauled by a WDM-3A diesel locomotive based at the New Guwahati Locomotive Shed.

== Coach composition ==
The train consists of 13 ICF coach:

- 13 General-class
- 2 Second-class Luggage/parcel van

== Direction reversal ==
The train reverses its direction 1 times:

- Dudhnoi

== See also ==
- Mendipathar railway station
- Guwahati railway station
- Dudhnoi–Mendipathar line
