= Jamunamukh =

Town in India

Jamunamukh is a town located in Hojai district in the Indian state of Assam. It is situated on the bank of the Jamuna River, which flows through the town and gives it its name. Jamunamukh is surrounded by three rivers: Jamuna, Kapili, and Nikhari.

Assamese is the official languages of this place, while Sylheti is most widely spoken.

== Etymology ==
The word "Jamunamukh" has its roots in the Assamese language, which is spoken in the region where the town is located.

Therefore, "Jamunamukh" can be interpreted as the place or location where the Jamuna River merges or meets with another river or body of water.

== Geography ==
Jamunamukh is a town located in the state of Assam, India. It is situated in the central part of the state and falls under the Nagaon district. The town is geographically positioned at approximate coordinates of 26.64°N latitude and 92.33°E longitude.

Jamunamukh is surrounded by Raha and Hojai Assembly Constituencies. Jamunamukh has an average elevation of 46 metres (151 feet). The town is surrounded by lush green forests. The climate in Jamunamukh is tropical, with an average temperature of 24 °C (75 °F) and high humidity throughout the year.

== Crimes ==
On May 31, 2018, while returning home from school, Arnamai Bora, a school teacher was attacked by two men, Moinul Haque and Salim Uddin. The accused two perpetrators reportedly following and subsequently attacked and raped her, strangled her to death, and disposed of her body in the nearest Kapili river.

== Economy ==
The economy of Jamunamukh is primarily based on agriculture, with the town being a major producer of rice and various other crops. The town also has a small industrial sector, with a few small-scale industries such as rice mills and tea processing units.

== Education ==
Jamunamukh has several educational institutions, including primary, secondary, and higher secondary schools, as well as a college. Some education institutions are listed below.

- Jamunamukh College
- Jamunamukh Higher Secondary School
- Jamunamukh Girls School, Jamunamukh
- Jamini Devi Majaliya Vidyalaya, Jamunamukh
- Rabindra Vidya Mandir, Jamunamukh
- Jamunamukh High Madrassa
- Jamuna-Kapili Junior College, Jamunamukh
- Shankardev Shishu Vidya Niketan, Jamunamukh
- Jamunamukh Jatiya Bidyalaya
- Giyandip Vidyapeeth, Jamunamukh
- Sunrise English Academy, Jamunamukh
- Green Valley English Academy, Jamunamukh

== Politics ==
Jamunamukh has been an assembly constituency since 1951 and is also a part of the Nowgaon Loksabha Constituency. As of the 2021 election, Siraj Uddin Ajmal from AIUDF is the representative of Jamunamukh.

== Transportation ==
=== Road ===
Jamunamukh is connected by road to the rest of India. Jamunamukh – Sarupather PWD Road is the life line for the people of Jamunamukh and its greater area. Jamunamukh is situated around 6 kilometres away from National Highway 36, Jamunamukh-Sarupather PWD Road connect the town to National Highway.

=== Rail ===
The nearest railway station is Jamunamukh railway station, which was built during British period & one of the oldest railway station in between Guwahati-Lumding section under NF Railway. The Railway Station is situated in the heart of the town.
