= Kampur =

Kampur Kampur
- Town
- Location in Assam, India Kampur (India)
- Coordinates: 26.20°N 92.63°E
- Country: India
- State: Assam
- District: Nagaon

Government
  - Body: Kampur Municipal Board
- Elevation: 48 m (157 ft)

Population (2011)
  - Total: 185,087

Languages
  - Official: Assamese
- Time zone: UTC+5:30 (IST)
- Postal code: 782426
- Vehicle registration: AS-02

Kampur Town (IPA: ˈkæmˌpʊə) (Assamese: কামপুৰ টাউন) is a census town in Nagaon district in the Indian state of Assam.

== Geography ==
Kampur has an average elevation of 48 m (157 ft).

Kampur town can be reached from Nagaon, Assam District in two ways. It is 32 km from Nagaon District. It is located on the bank of the Kapili River. Kampur railway station is located on the Guwahati–Lumding railway line operated by the Northeast Frontier Railway zone.

== Demographics ==
As of 2011 India census, Kampur municipality board has a population of 10,371 of which 5,230 are males while 5,141 are females.

The population of children with age of 0-6 is 1035 which is 9.98% of the total. The female sex ratio is 983 against the state average of 958. Moreover, the child sex ratio is around 917 compared to Assam state average of 962. The literacy rate is 88.28% higher than the state average of 72.19%. Male literacy is around 91.28% while the female literacy rate is 85.26%.

The town supplies over 2,342 houses with amenities including water and sewerage. It builds roads within town limits and taxes properties under its jurisdiction.

== Religion ==
The town includes people who are Hindu (84.9%), Muslim (14.2%), Christian (.5%), Sikh (.2%), Buddhist (0) Jain (.1%), other (0%), and not stated (.1%).
