= Arnamai bora rape case =

Arnamai Bora Rape Case
- Location: Jamunamukh, Hojai, Assam, India
- Date: May 31, 2018
- Victim: Arnamai Bora
- Accused: Moinul Haque, Salim Uddin
- Charges: Rape, murder, destruction of evidence

The Arnamai Bora rape case involves the brutal rape and murder of a 58-year-old school teacher in Jamunamukh, Assam, which occurred on May 31, 2018. The incident sparked widespread outrage and protests across the state.

== Incident ==
Arnamai Bora was a government school teacher who frequently crossed the Kopili River to reach her school, Changjurai Ilashi Deuri Primary School, in the Jamunamukh area of Hojai district. On May 31, 2018, while returning home from school, she was attacked allegedly by Moinul Haque and Salim Uddin. According to prosecutors, they followed her and subsequently attacked her.

Bora's body was discovered the following day, leading to a swift investigation by local authorities. The police arrested the two suspects on June 1, 2018, after public outrage and protests demanding justice for Bora intensified. They confessed to the police that they raped her, strangled her to death, and disposed of her body in the river.

== Public reaction and protest ==
The case has drawn significant media attention and public protests, emphasizing the urgent need for effective measures to combat violence against women in Assam. Activists and community leaders have called for stricter laws and better enforcement to protect women and ensure justice in cases of sexual violence.

== Police investigation and legal proceedings ==
A FIR was registered at Jamunamukh Police Station. Haque and Uddin were booked under Sections 302/34, 2001/34 and 376(A) of the Indian Penal Code.

In December 2022, the Additional District and Sessions Judge Court in Hojai sentenced Haque to death and Uddin to life imprisonment. However, both appealed the verdict.

On January 17, 2023, the Gauhati High Court commuted the death sentences of Haque and Uddin to three years in prison. The High Court's decision was met with public disappointment and raised concerns about the judicial process in such serious cases.

Later, Assam Chief Minister, Himanta Biswa Sarma, said the state government would go to the Supreme Court, if needed, after reviewing the Gauhati High Court's decision.

== Criticism ==
The Assam Director General of Police, Bhaskar Jyoti Mahanta, acknowledged faults in the police investigation, admitting that charges under certain sections of the Indian Penal Code were not properly applied. This admission highlighted systemic issues within the investigative process and the need for reform to ensure justice for victims of sexual violence.
