= Paneri =

- Village
- Location in Assam, India Paneri (India)
- Coordinates: 26.06°N 91.29°E
- Country: India
- State: Assam
- District: Kamrup

Government
  - Body: Gram panchayat

Languages
  - Official: Assamese
- Time zone: UTC+5:30 (IST)
- PIN: 781123
- ISO 3166 code: IN-AS
- Vehicle registration: AS
- Website: kamrup.nic.in

Paneri is a village in Kamrup, situated in south bank of Brahmaputra river.

== Transport ==
Paneri is accessible through National Highway 37. All major private commercial vehicles ply between Paneri and nearby towns.

== See also ==
- Panikhaiti
- Palahartari
