= Pitambarhat Bazali =

- Village
- Location in Assam, India Pitambarhat Bazali (India)
- Coordinates: 26.08°N 91.56°E
- Country: India
- State: Assam
- District: Kamrup

Languages
  - Official: Assamese
- Time zone: UTC+5:30 (IST)
- PIN: 781354
- Vehicle registration: AS
- Website: kamrup.nic.in

Pitambarhat Bazali is a village in Kamrup, situated in south bank of Brahmaputra river.

== Transport ==
Pubborka is accessible through National Highway 37. All major private commercial vehicles ply between Pitambarhat Bazali and nearby towns.

== See also ==
- Guakuchi
- Ramdia
