= Dudhnoi =

- village
- Location in Assam, India Dudhnoi (India)
- Coordinates: 25°59′00″N 90°46′55″E
- Country: India
- State: Assam
- District: Goalpara
- Elevation: 44 m (144 ft)

Languages
  - Official: Assamese
- Time zone: UTC+5:30 (IST)
- Postal code: 783124
- ISO 3166 code: IN-AS
- Vehicle registration: AS 18
- Coastline: 0 kilometres (0 mi)
- Nearest city: Goalpara

Dudhnoi is a town in Goalpara district, Assam, India.

== Geography ==
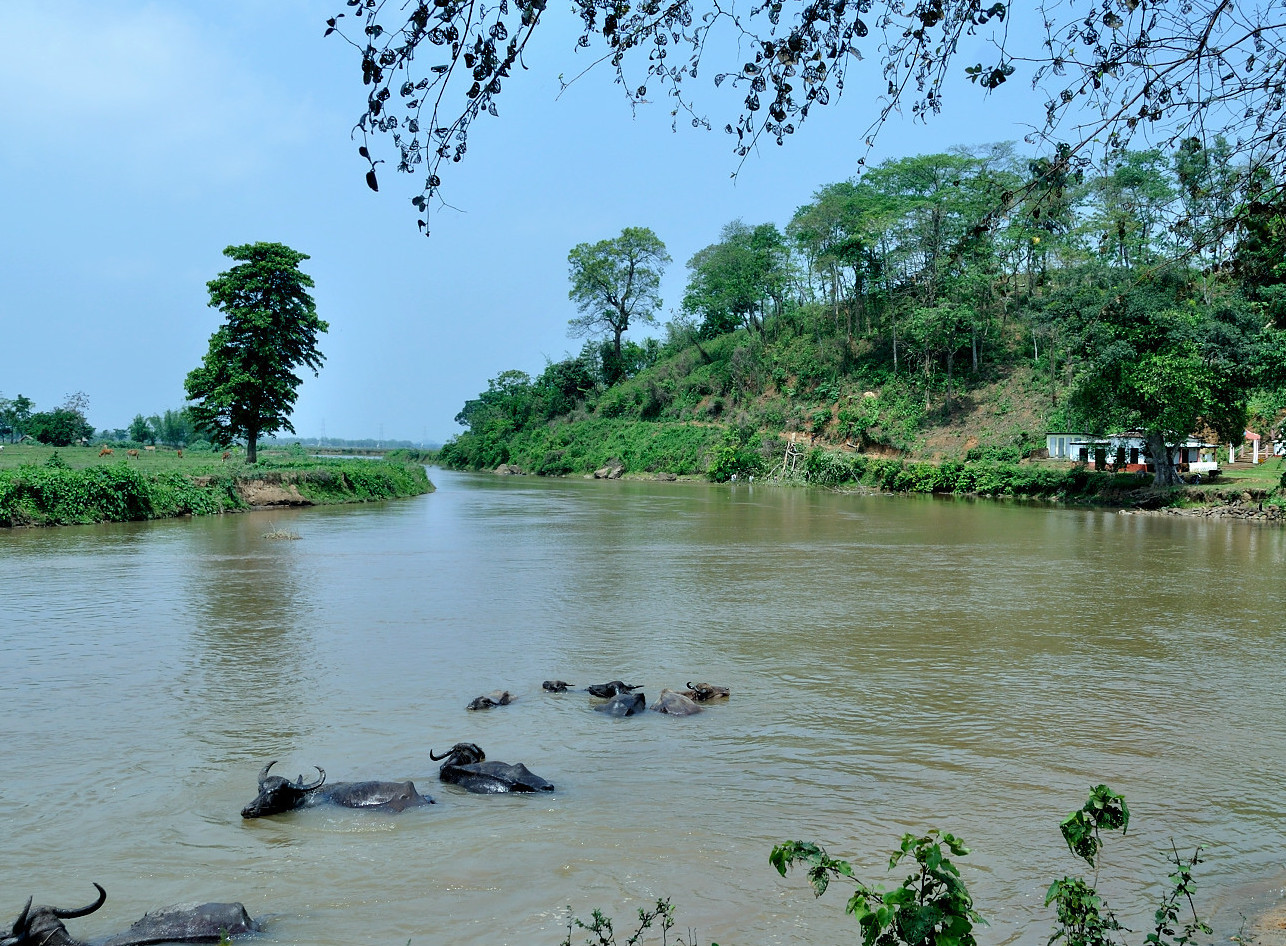
Dudhnoi river, Goalpara

It is located at 25°59′0″N 90°44′0″E at an elevation of 44 m above MSL.

River: Dudhnoi River, a tributary of Brahmaputra river.

== Location ==
National Highway 37,( Panchratna (near Goalpara) across Assam state to Roing in Arunachal Pradesh) runs from the heart of Dudhnoi

National Highway 62, which links Damra and Dalu, Starts from Dudhnoi.

State Highway 46 (SH 46) which links Goalpara via Mornoi (Sainik School) also starts from Dudhnoi

== Politics ==
Dudhnoi assembly constituency is part of Guwahati (Lok Sabha constituency).

Dudhnoi Legislative Assembly is reserved for Scheduled Tribes candidates only.

The Headquarters of Rabha Hasong Autonomous Council (RHAC) is at Dudhnoi.

== Education and scholarly activity ==
=== Primary and secondary education ===
Don Bosco School: Don Bosco School, Damra. This school aims at the education of the Catholic community around, but extends its service to members of other communities to the extent possible. The primary aim of the institution is to impart sound formation based on the principles of Christian faith to the members of Christian community.

Dudhnoi Girls' High School (1964).

Dudhnoi High School (1955).

It is a provincialized School and was provincialized in 1977. It has 11 classes from class 'Ka' to class x, since May 2017.

Jawahar Navodaya Vidyalaya Dudhnoi : It is known as JNV, Dudhnoi. JNV s are Indian schools for talented rural children and form a part of the system of gifted education. Its significance lies in the selection of talented rural children as the target group and the attempt to provide them with quality education comparable to the best in a residential school system, without regard to their family's socio-economic condition

New Dudhnoi Sishu Vidyalaya.

Bhalapara Sonapur L.P.S.

Dudhnoi Practising L.P.S.

Dudhnoi Saranarthy L.P.S.

Khara Medhi Para L.P.S.

Khara Mondalgram L.P.S.

Khara Govt Sr. Basic School

Tangabari L.P.S.

St. Peter's National Academy, Dudhnoi, Goalpara

Nirmala English High School: Nirmala School, Damra, Goalpara is a private Catholic educational institution, established, managed and run by the Missionary Sisters of Mary Help of Christians, according to the principles and method of Don Bosco, based on reason, religion and kindness.

Ekalavya English School: Ekalavya English School is 15 km in distance from Dudhnoi, situated in Matia, Goalpara. It is a new private educational institution.

Sainik School Goalpara:It is hardly 18 km from Dudhnoi via Matia. It was established on 12 November 1964, under the Ministry of Defence. The idea of Sainik schools were presented by the then Defence Minister V.K.Menon in 1961. Initially 18 Sainik schools were founded & Its one among those all.

=== Higher education and research ===
Dudnoi Ayurvedic medical college & Hospital. Ayurvedic Hospital in Dudhnoi: On 23 December 2017, Assam's Health Minister laid the foundation stone of an ayurvedic college in Dudhnoi.

Basic Training Centre, Dudhnoi Established in the year of 1949. Apart from a prestigious and age old Institute of elementary teachers training, the institute has historical importance. It has earned reputation by the visits of eminent personalities like Dr. Rajendra Prasad, the first president of India during 1951 and Acharya Vinoba Bhave held the meeting with State members in during Sarvodaya Movement.

District Institute of Education and Training (DIET), Dudhnoi, Goalpara, Assam

Dudhnoi College, (1972)

Krishi Vigyan Kendra (KVK), Dudhnoi, District. Goalpara.

== Transport and communication ==
=== Nearest airport ===
Lokpriya Gopinath Bordoloi International (LGBI) Airport, Guwahati (Airport code: GAU) is around 90 kilometers from Dudhnoi.

=== Nearest railway station ===
Dudhnoi Railway Station (it is a small station). Station code: DDNI.

=== District Transport Office ===
Dudhnoi's concerned District Transport Office is at Agia Road, Bhalukdubi, P.O. Baladmari, District- Goalpara, Assam-783121. The registration number starts with AS-18.

=== Postal and courier services ===
India Post: Dudhnoi Sub Post Office. PIN: 783124

== Sports ==
=== Playgrounds ===
- Dudhnoi Sports Association Play ground.
- Dudhnoi College Playground
- Udaipur playground, Dudhnoi
- Balasara Playground, Dudhnoi

== Culture ==
=== Festivals ===
Bohag (aka Rongali) Bihu, Magh (aka Bhogali) Bihu, Kati (aka Kongali) Bihu, Bishuwa (festival of Koch Rajbongshi), Holi (Doljatra), Diwali (aka Dewali, Deepawali), Baikho, Bwisagu, Chhat Puja, Lakshmi (Lokkhi) Puja, Christmas, Hari (Hori) Puja, Durga Puja, Biswakarma (Biswokorma) Puja, English New Year, Ram Navami, Navaratri, Kali Puja, Baseda (Bashyoda), Maha Shivaratri, Raksha Bandhan, Bijaya Dashami (Dussehra, Dasain), Krishna Janmashtami, Saraswati Puja (Vasant Panchami), Hanuman Jayanti, Teej, Ganesh Chaturthi, Bhai Phota

== Media and entertainment ==
Movie Theatre: Ambika Cine Palace, in Damra Road.

== Important services ==
Electricity

Cooking Gas: Brahmaputra Gas Agency, Dudhnoi (Indane).

Fire: Fire & Emergency Services Station, Dudhnoi.

Waste disposal

Water

Sewer

PWD

Pollution testing

Gas stations (Petrol Pump)

Telephone and internet

Banks: Assam Gramin Vikash Bank, Bandhan Bank, Central Bank of India, State Bank of India, UCO Bank, Assam Cooperative Apex Bank, Axis Bank, LIC of India.

Hospitals and dispensaries: Dudhnoi CHC (Community Health Centre) & FRU (First Referral Unit)

Veterinary: State Veterinary Dispensary, Dudhnoi (in College Road)
