= Kapila River (Maharashtra) =

River in Maharashtra, India

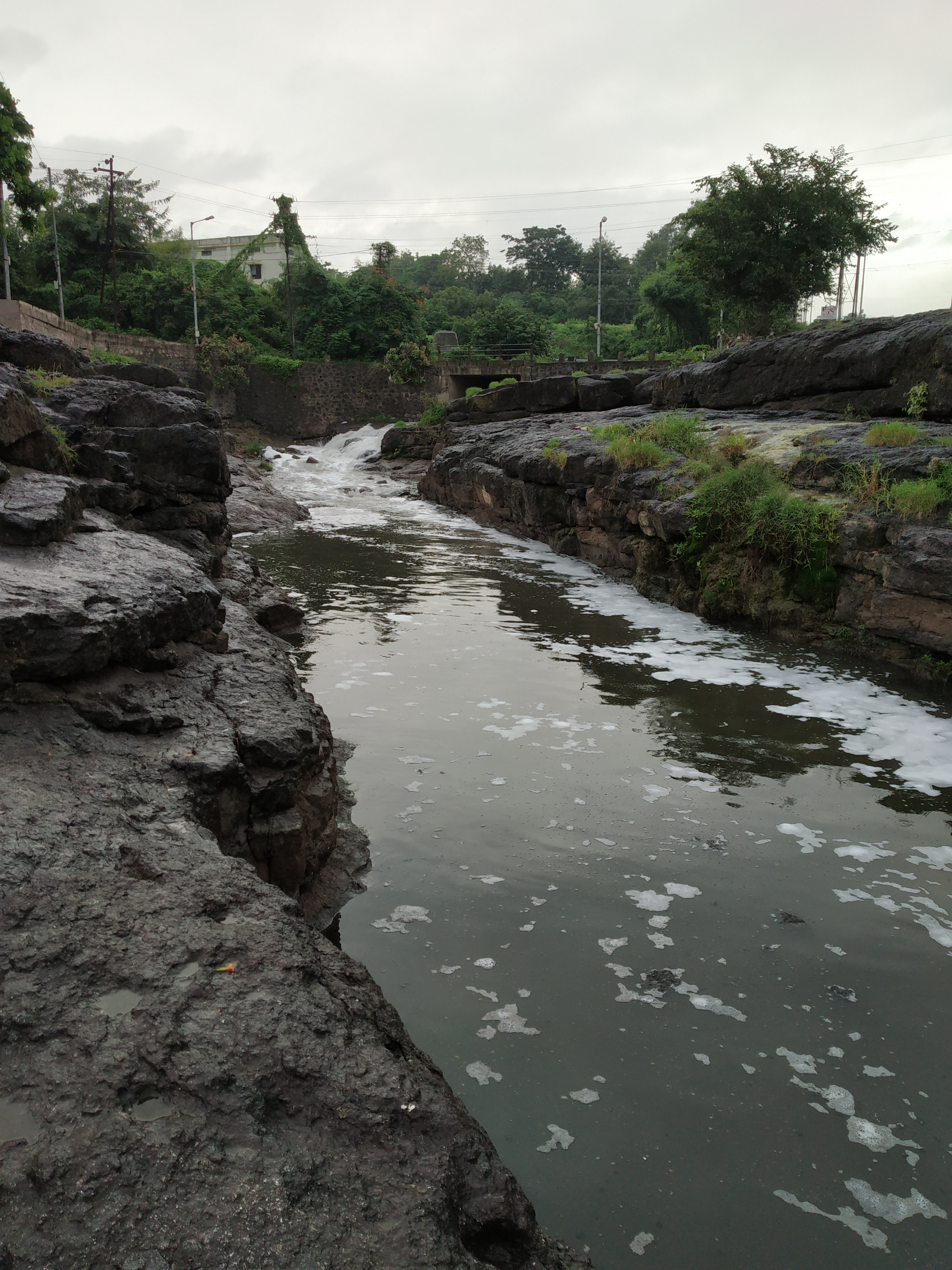
- Kapila River in Panchawati, Nashik
- Native name: कपिला नदी (Marathi)

Location
- Country: India
- State: Maharashtra
- District: Nashik

Physical characteristics
- Mouth
  - coordinates: 19°59′59″N 73°48′56″E

The Kapila (Marathi: कपिला नदी) is a river in Maharashtra. It is a minor tributary of the Godavari River, India's second longest river after the Ganga. The river is named after Rishi Kapila.

== Gallery photos ==
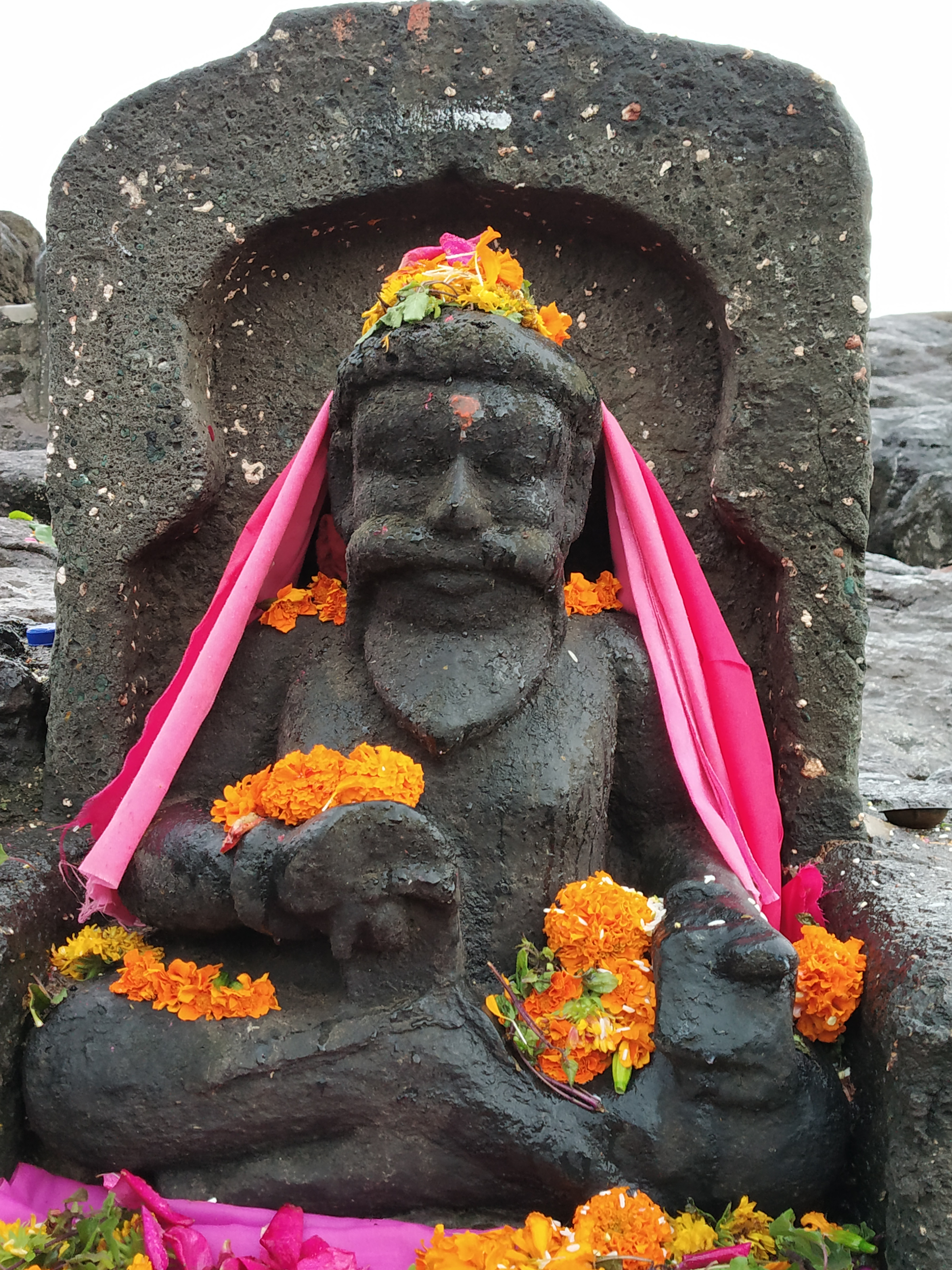
Statue of Kapila Muni on the bank of Kapila River, Nashik

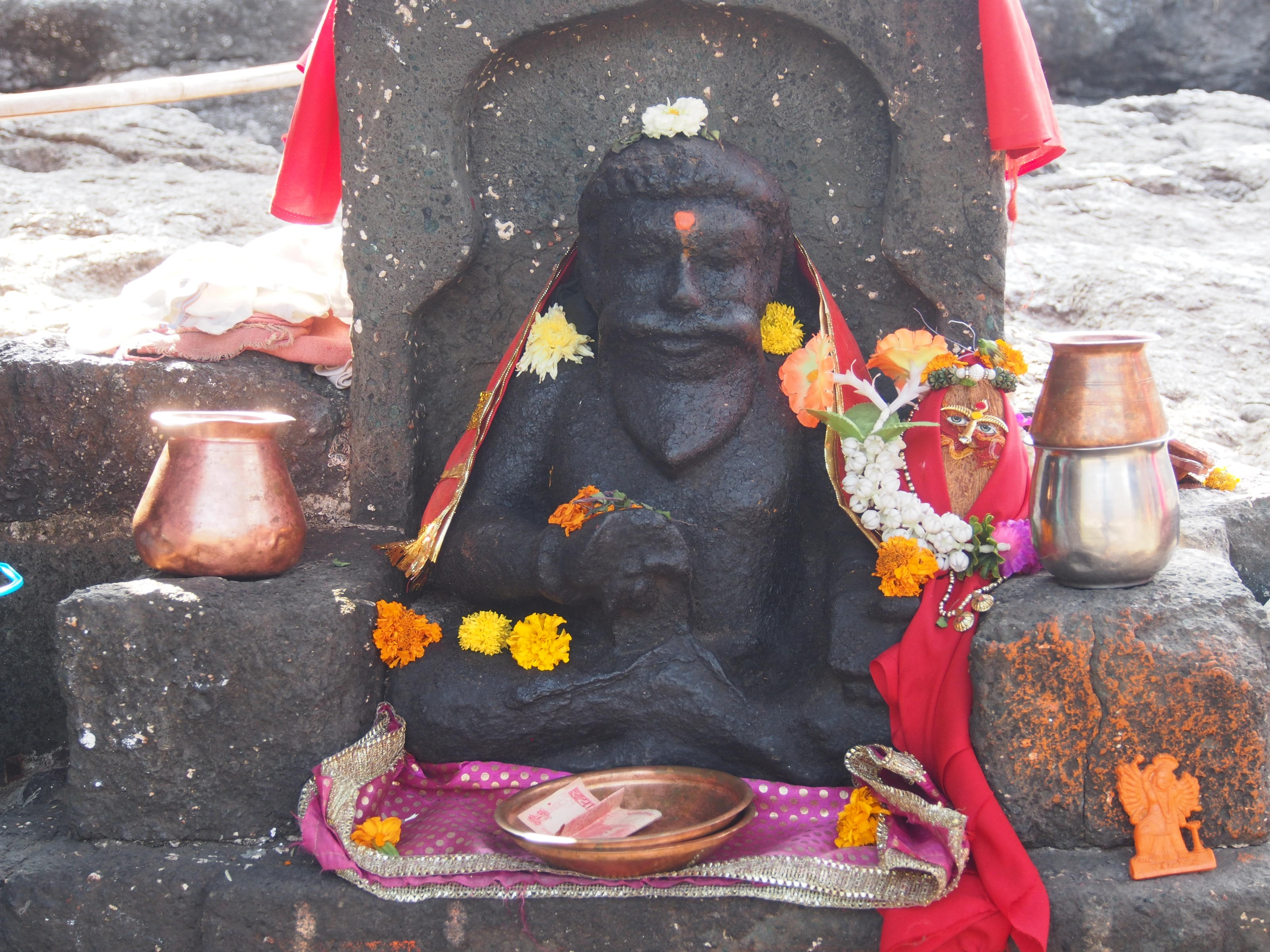
Statue of Kapila Muni on the bank of Kapila River, Nashik
