= Centre for Research on Energy and Clean Air =

Thinktank researching energy and air pollution

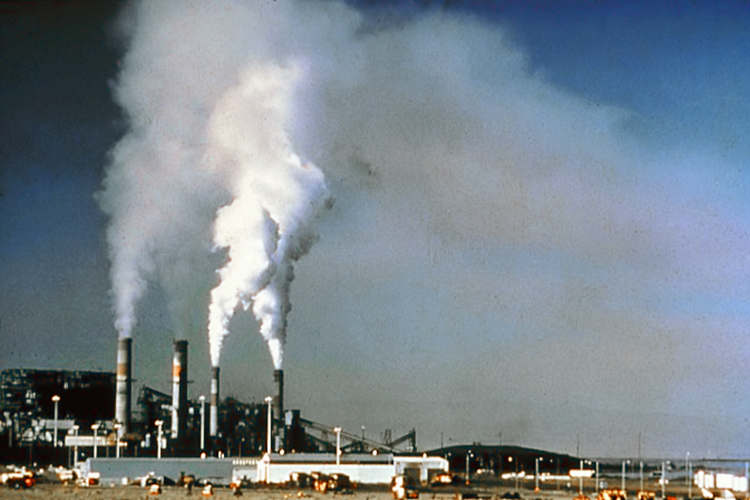
- Abbreviation: CREA
- Type: Independent Research Organisation
- Website: energyandcleanair.org

The Centre for Research on Energy and Clean Air (CREA) is a nonprofit think tank researching energy and air pollution. CREA was founded in Helsinki in 2019 with the goal of tracking the impacts of air pollution by providing data-backed research products.

== Research and publications ==
In July 2025, BBC News reported on work done by the CREA. Lauri Myllyvirta, co-founder of the organisation, found that China's carbon emissions declined in the 12 months up to May 2025, even as demand for new power generation grew rapidly, marking a potential milestone in addressing climate change.
