= Resubelpara =

Resubelpara Resu
- City
- Location in Meghalaya, India Resubelpara (India)
- Coordinates: 25.8943300°N 90.5997800°E
- Country: India
- State: Meghalaya
- District: North Garo Hills

Government
  - Body: Resubelpara Municipal Board

Population (2011)
  - Total: 104,514

Languages
  - Regional: Garo
- Time zone: UTC+5:30 (IST)
- PIN: 794108
- Telephone code: 913659
- Vehicle registration: ML - 13

Resubelpara, also known as Resu, is the headquarters of North Garo Hills District in the state of Meghalaya in India. The town is situated along the Damring River.

== History ==
Resubelpara Administrative Unit was upgraded to a full-fledged civil subdivision that went into effect on April 30, 1982, under the government's bill HPL 539/81/11 dated April 22, 1982.

== Demographics ==
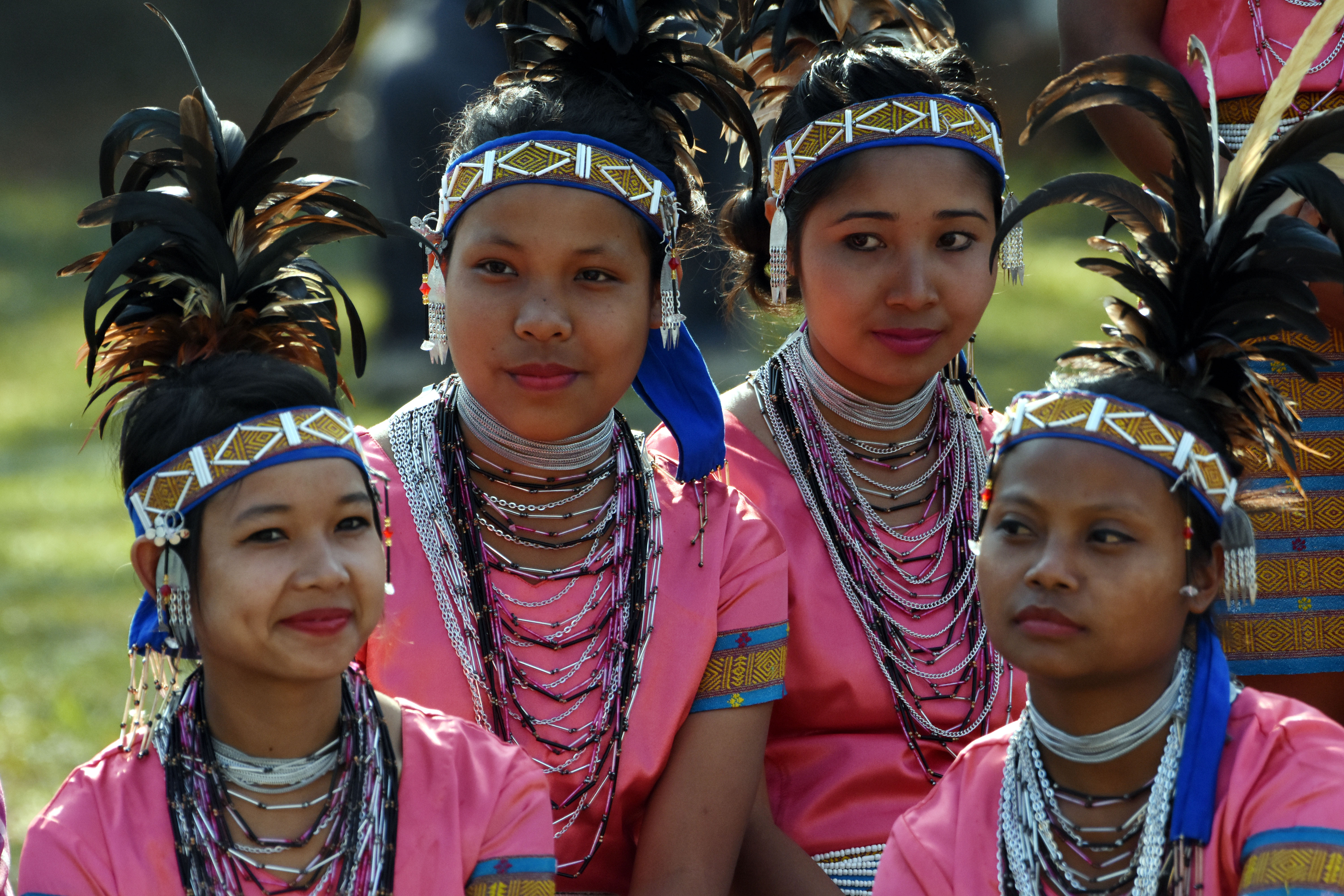
Young Garo girls in traditional dress before the start of a festival in Resubelpara in 2016

As of 2001 India census, Resubelpara had a population of 17,652. Males constituted around 51% of the population and females constituted around 49%. It has an average literacy rate of 68%, higher than the national average of 59.5%. Male literacy is 69%, and female literacy stands at 66%. 17% of the population is under 6 years of age.

== Transport ==
The nearest airport is at Guwahati and the nearest railway station is Mendipathar which comes under the Resubelpara Municipal Board Jurisdiction.

== Places of interest ==
- Beijing Warri
- Rangdokram
- Shiv Susu (Lingam), Nokat
- Rangjokram Lake
- Dap
- Damring Beach, Dekachang
- Nakachikong
- Rongmagitil

== Education ==
As of the 2011 Census of India, Resubelpara had 10 primary schools, 3 middle schools, 3 secondary schools, 3 senior secondary schools and 1 special school for the disabled, as well as Mendipathar College, an arts college.

== People ==
Mainly inhabited by the Garos and the Rabhas.

== Festivals ==
The Awe Winter Festival is celebrated in Resubelpara in December and is organized by the District Administration North Garo Hills. The Millennium Festival is celebrated in Resubelpara during the month of December.

Wangala (also known as Hundred Drums, Wanna, Wanna Rongchua) is a Harvesting Festival of Garos. They give thanks to God and Goddess, called Misi Saljong, known as "Pattigipa Ra’rongipa" (Sun-God), for blessing human beings with a rich harvest of the season.

Wangala is celebrated two or three days or one-week gathering two or three villages, though recently it has been celebrated for one day in metropolitan areas. "Rugala" and "chachat So'a" are celebrated on the first day. This is performed inside the house of the Nokma or Chief of the village. "Dama Gogata" is celebrated on the last day.

During Wangala, people young and old dress in colourful clothing (Dakmanda, Daksari, gando) with feathered headgear (do’me) and dance to the tune of music played on Damas.

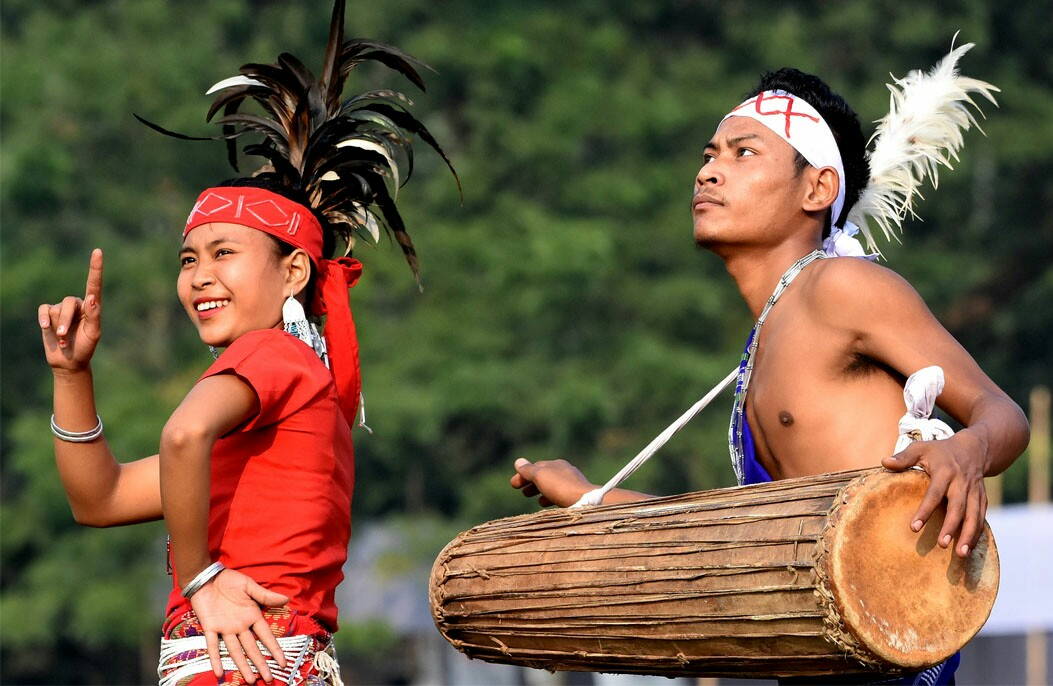
Young people performing during Wangala Awe Winter Festival Resubelpara 2017

"Katta Dokka" (talking in a singing style), "Ajea", Dani Dokka (describing Wangala by singing), Chambil Moa or Pomelo Dance, etc. are performed during these days. Wangala is celebrated in the months from September to December.
