= Pingaleswar =

- Village
- Location in Assam, India Pingaleswar (India)
- Coordinates: 26.37°N 91.77°E
- Country: India
- State: Assam
- District: Kamrup

Government
  - Body: Gram panchayat

Languages
  - Official: Assamese
- Time zone: UTC+5:30 (IST)
- PIN: 781381
- Vehicle registration: AS
- Website: kamrup.nic.in

Pingaleswar is a village in Kamrup, situated in north Brahmaputra bank.

== Transport ==
Pingaleswar is accessible through National Highway 31. All major private commercial vehicles ply between Pingaleswar and nearest towns Baihta Chariali.

Visit: Pingaleswar is famous for the Siva Mandir Pingaleswar Siva Dewalaya. Pingaleswar dewalaya.

== See also ==
- Guakuchi
- Ramdia
