= Guwahati–Lumding section =

Railway section in India

Guwahati–Lumding section (including Chaparmukh-Silghat Town & Chaparmukh-Mairabari branch lines)
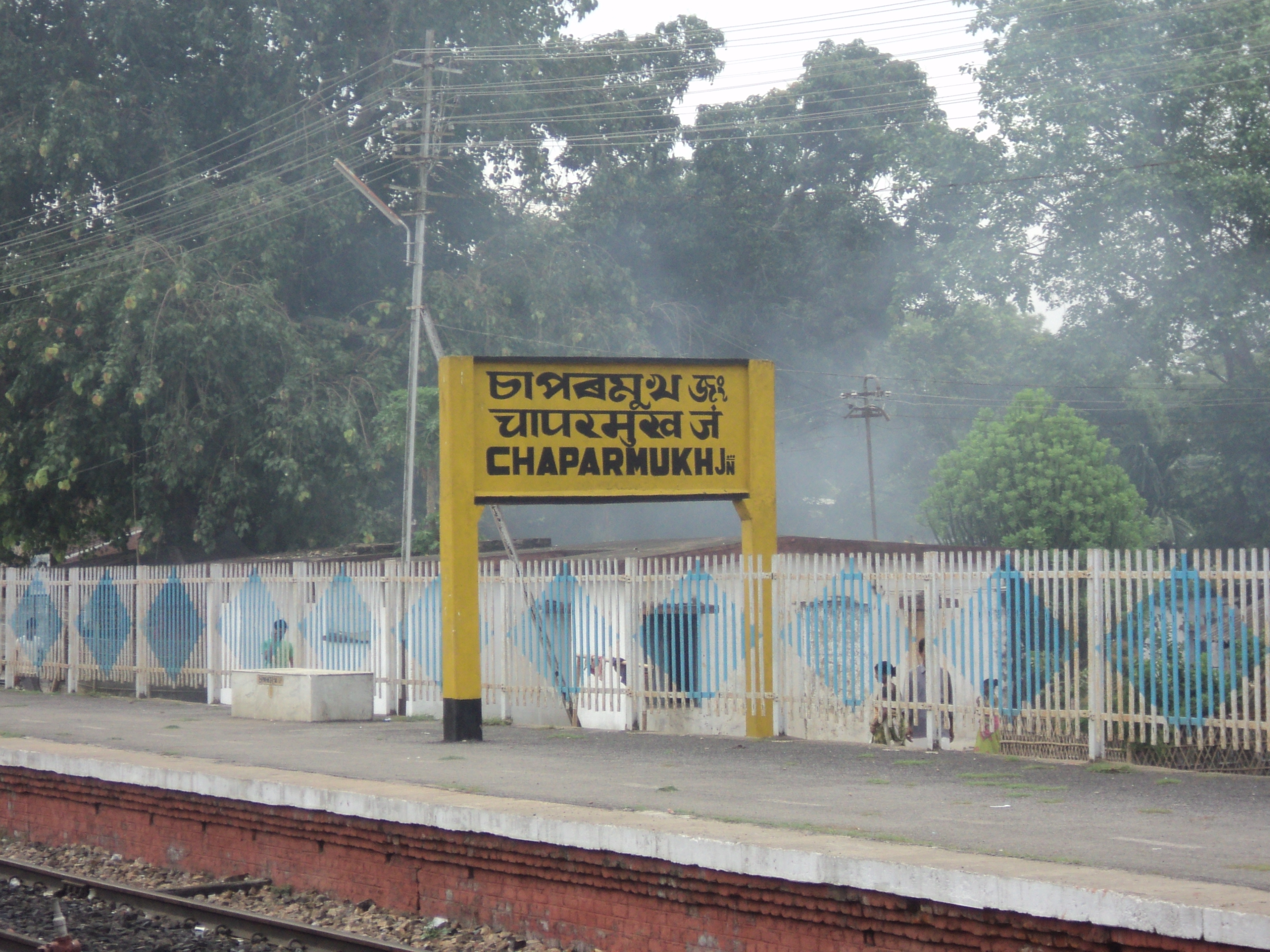
- Chaparmukh Junction an important railway station on Guwahati–Lumding section

Overview
- Status: Operational
- Owner: Indian Railways
- Locale: Assam
- Termini: Guwahati; Lumding

Service
- Operator: Northeast Frontier Railway zone

History
- Opened: 1900; 126 years ago

Technical
- Line length: 180 km (112 mi)
- Number of tracks: 1
- Track gauge: 1,676 mm (5 ft 6 in)
- Old gauge: 1,000 mm (3 ft 3 3/8 in)
- Electrification: Yes
- Operating speed: 110 km/h (68 mph)

The Guwahati–Lumding section is a broad-gauge railway line connecting Guwahati and Lumding Junction. The 180-kilometre (110 mi) long railway line operates in the Indian state of Assam. It is under the jurisdiction of Northeast Frontier Railway zone.

== History ==
The Assam Railway and Trading Company Limited was incorporated in 1881. The first metre-gauge locomotive was put into service in Assam in 1882. The 64-kilometre (40 mi)-long line from Dibrugarh steamer ghat to Makum was opened to passenger traffic on 16 July 1883. The objective of opening an isolated railway in upper Assam was to link the tea gardens and coalfields to the steamer ghats. In the latter part of the 19th century, the Dibru–Sadiya railway was 149-kilometre (93 mi) long. The 1,000 mm (3 ft 3+3/8 in)-wide metre-gauge railway track earlier laid by Assam Bengal Railway from Chittagong to Lumding was extended to Tinsukia on the Dibru–Sadiya line in 1903. The Assam Bengal Railway constructed a branch line to Guwahati, connecting the city to the eastern line in 1900. During the 1900–1910 period, the Eastern Bengal Railway built the Golakganj-Amingaon branch line, thus connecting the western bank of the Brahmaputra to the western line. In 1904, The Mariani–Furkating line wa made & it was operated by Jorhat-Provincial Railway. In 1937, the British also planned Guwahati-Dhaka line in Meter Gauge which was slated to connect Guwahati with Dewanganj Upazila(Bangladesh) as Dewangaunge was already connected with Dhaka via Mymensingh by a 259-kilometre (161 mi) long Meter Gauge line. The 323-kilometre (201 mi) long Railway Guwahati-Dewanganj project was scrapped in 1943-1947 period owing to Second World War, Indian National Army defeating the British & partition of India. Post Independence in 1947, Assam was connected with India through the newly laid Kishanganj-Fakirgram Railway line. The 300.1 kilometres (186.5 mi) Meter Gauge line was completed in 1950 under General Karnail Singh & General Kodandera Subayya Thimayya (Gen. KS Thimayya) of Indian Army.

== Broad gauge ==
The railway tracks from Guwahati to Lumding and from Chaparmukh to Haibargaon were upgraded from metre gauge to 5 ft 6 in (1,676 mm) broad gauge in 1994.

This Guwahati-Lumding route section has 2 branch lines connecting Chaparmukh with Moirabari & Shilghat Town near Kaziranga National Park via Nagaon. Chaparmukh to Shilghat Town section is 82 kilometres (51 mi) with Moirabari line branching at Senchoa & going for 50 kilometres (31 mi).

Under construction branch route to Shillong is being made from Tetelia & is completed uptill Byrnihat, 22.5 kilometres (14.0 mi) from Tetelia. But the entire 108 kilometres (67 mi) rest part of the section is stalled due to terroristic activities by Khasi & Jaintia Militant groups.

== Line doubling ==
The Guwahati-Lumding-Dibrugarh line was proposed to be doubled in the Railway Budget for 2011–12. Guwahati to Digaru was doubled by 2012-13, Digaru to Hojai was doubled by 2013-14. The 45 km (28 mi) long Lumding-Hojai doubling project was sanctioned in 2012–13. The Lumding Hojai patch doubling was completed on 10 July 2019. The 30.50 km (19 mi) long New Guwahati-Digaru doubling project was completed in 2012–13. As on date the whole 180 kilometres (110 mi) section is fully electrified double line.

== Railway reorganisation ==
The Assam Railway and Trading Company Limited was merged with Assam Bengal Railway in 1945. With partition, Assam Bengal Railway was split up and railway lines in Assam became Assam Railway. In 1952, North East Railway was formed with the amalgamation of Assam Railway, Oudh-Tiirhut Railway and the Kanpur-Achnera section of Bombay, Baroda and Central India Railway. Northeast Frontier Railway was created with a part of NE Railway in 1958.
