= Churaibari railway station =

Railway station in Tripura, India

Churaibari Railway Station

General information
- Location: Churaibari, North Tripura, Tripura; India
- Coordinates: 24.4335052°N 92.2400244°E
- Elevation: 43 m (141 ft)
- System: Indian Railways station Regional rail
- Owner: Indian Railways
- Operator: Northeast Frontier Railway
- Line: Lumding–Sabroom section
- Platforms: 3
- Tracks: 4
- Connections: Auto rickshaw

Construction
- Structure type: Standard (on-ground station)
- Parking: Available

Other information
- Status: Functioning
- Station code: CBZ
- Zone(s): Northeast Frontier Railway zone
- Division(s): Lumding

History
- Opened: 2008; 18 years ago
- Rebuilt: 2016; 10 years ago
- Electrified: Ongoing

Services
Preceding station	Indian Railways	Following station
Nadiapur towards ?	Northeast Frontier Railway zone Lumding–Sabroom section	Tilbhum towards ?
Location
- Location within Tripura

Churaibari Railway Station is located at Churaibari in Tripura, India. It is an Indian railway station of the Lumding–Sabroom line in the Northeast Frontier Railway zone of Indian Railways. The station is situated at Churaibari in North Tripura district in the Indian state of Tripura. Total 4 Passengers trains halt in the station.

== History ==
Churaibari railway station became operation in 2008 with the meter gauge line from Lumding to Agartala but later in 2016 entire section converted into broad-gauge line.

== Details ==
The station lies on the 312 km-long 1,676 mm (5 ft 6 in) broad-gauge Lumding–Sabroom railway line which comes under the Lumding railway division of the Northeast Frontier Railway zone of Indian Railways. It is a single line without electrification.

== Services ==
- 1 train per day runs between Dharmanagar and Silchar. The train stops at Panisagar station.
- 1 train per day runs between Agartala and Silchar. The train stops at Panisagar station.

== Station ==
=== Station layout ===
G	Street level	Exit/Entrance & Ticket counter
P1	FOB, Side platform, No-1 doors will open on the left/right
P1	Track 1	toward →
P1	Track 2	toward →
P1	Track 3	toward →
P1	FOB, Island platform, No- 2 doors will open on the left/right
P1	Island platform, No- 3 doors will open on the left/right
Track 4	toward →

=== Platforms ===
There are 3 platforms and 4 tracks. The platforms are connected by foot overbridge.
