= Uatlok Twithu =

- city
- Location within Tripura Location within India
- Country: India
- State: Tripura
- District: West Tripura

Languages
  - Official: Kokborok
- Time zone: UTC+5:30 (IST)
- Vehicle registration: TR
- Sex ratio: 91-0381 ♂/♀
- Website: tripura.gov.in

Uatlok Twithu also known as Borokathal, is a small town located in the interior of Mohanpur sub-division of West Tripura district of Tripura, India. The Sumli river flows through the town. The locality consist of the ethnic Tripuri people. The town has the only higher secondary school of the area.

== The Location ==
Uatlok Twithu is in the TTAADC. It is located in Sadar subdivision of West Tripura district in Tripura state of India. It is a strategic location in northern Sadar subdivision because of its existence as the starting point for journey to the Hathai Kotor hills.

The town is situated over the plains besides the river Sumli that originates from Damra Hills in Hathai Kotor hill range. It has connectivity of road with important interior villages of Mokam, Abhicharan, Kisong, Boiragi, Hezamara and to Khowai District through Hathai Kotor.

== Barkathal Baptist Church ==
The local church of Uatlok Twithu is one of the oldest in the Sumli Valley area. It has been the mother church of more than 9 other churches like Khwichang Baptist Church, Boiragi Baptist Church, Tokmakari Baptist Church, Yacharai Baptist Church and more.

== Education ==
- Tipprah Academy. Tipprah Academy High School was established in 1992 and it is managed by the Pvt. Unaided. It is located in Rural area. It is located in Hezamara Block of West Tripura district of Tripura. The school consists of Grades from 1 to 12.
- Our Lady of Holy Cross School, Barkathal. It is a private school run by the Sisters of Holy Cross living in Saint Andre Parish, Bodhjungnagar, Agartala, Tripura. The level of education is from pre-school to Class 12.
- Barkathal Higher Secondary School was established in 1948 and it is managed by the Department of Education. It is located in Hezamara block of West Tripura district of Tripura. The school consists of Grades from 1 to 12. The school is Co-educational and it doesn't have an attached pre-primary section. English is the medium of instructions in this school.

== Nearby villages ==
The villages nearby includes Dugrai, Tokmakari, Chintaram, Kutna Chikon, Kutna Kotor, Khwichang, Chakhuma, Twibru, Urua, and Twiraja.

== See also ==
- Tripuri people
- TTAADC
- Khumulwng, the headquarters of TTAADC
- Kokborok
