= Tokmakari =

- village
- Location in Tripura, India
- Coordinates: 23.958°N 91.444°E
- Country: India
- State: Tripura

Languages
  - Official: Kokborok, English
- Time zone: UTC+5:30 (IST)
- Vehicle registration: TR
- Website: tripura.gov.in

Tokmakari is a village located in the 2 kilometers interiors from Borokathal town of Tripura. This village is populated by the ethnic Tripuri tribes. Kokborok is the language spoken by the people of this village.

== Description ==
The village of Tokmakari is situated in between the foot hills of Boromura range and the plains of Sumli river. It is accessible through road via Borokathal town. This village falls under the Tripura Tribal Areas Autonomous District Council. It is in the Sadar sub-division of West Tripura district of Tripura.

There are more than 100 families dwelling in this village. The mainstay of the villagers is farming and small local business. The main market is in the nearby Borokathal town. There is a brick-soled road leading to the village from Borokathal. Electricity is available in this village.

== Nearby villages ==
The villages surrounding Tokmakari are Kutna Kotor, Kutna Chikon, Radhanagar and Dugrai.
