= Agartala Baptist Church =

Church in Tripura

Agartala Baptist Church is a Baptist Church in the city of Agartala, the capital of Tripura state in India. It is affiliated to the Tripura Baptist Christian Union (TBCU) and is located at Arundhutinagar in the southern part of Agartala city.

== History ==
It is the oldest church in Agartala and was established in the 1930s.

== Controversy ==
Religion has long been a source of tension in Tripura, with the state government accusing the TBCU of links with the National Liberation Front of Tripura, which was designated as a terrorist organisation under the Prevention of Terrorism Act, 2002. Guards had to be posted outside the headquarters of the Baptist Church in Agartala for fear of reprisals after the secretary of the Noapara Baptist Church was arrested in possession of explosives. Such fears were justified; the church in the nearby district of Krishnanagar was attacked by a mob in February the following year.

== Affiliation ==
The church comes under the Abhicharan Circle of the Sadar North Baptist Association of TBCU.

== See also ==
- National Liberation Front of Tripura
- Agartala City Baptist Church
- AKSB
