= Dugrai =

Coordinates: 25°54′N 80°38′E

Dugrai is a village across plains of Sumli valley of Borokathal in Sadar sub-division of West Tripura in the state of Tripura, India. It also falls under the Tripura Tribal Areas Autonomous District Council.

The people dwelling in this interior village belong to the Tripuri tribe and they speak Kokborok. Their main livelihood is farming and paddy is the only crop grown mainly in this village. Rice is their staple food. Amenities like electricity and telephone is available.

== See also ==
- Khumulwng
- Tripuri Dances
