= KOK Baptist Association =

KOK Baptist Association (KOKBA) is a Kokborok speaking Baptist community in Tripura. It is located within the Khowai district of Tripura in India. It has around 3,800 communicant members in 60 churches.

== History ==
The KOKBA was established in the year 1990.

== Organization ==
The Association is led by the Executive Secretary. The Association is registered under the TBCU.

== Workers of KOKBA ==
The workers of Central Baptist Association have been grouped mainly into five categories as below:

- Pastor
- Pro-Pastor
- Ordained Evangelist
- Evangelist
- Office Worker

== Pastors of KOKBA ==
The pastors of the KOKBA are:

1. Rev. Sunil Debbarma

== Ordained Evangelists of KOKBA ==
1. Ord. Evan. Suran Pada Kalai
2. Ord. Evan. Dharmendra Debbarma
3. Ord. Evan. Samaresh Debbarma

== Evangelists of KOKBA ==
1. Evan. Mangthar Debbarma
2. Evan. Ahlem Debbarma
3. Evan. Philip Rupini
4. Evan. Kishore Debbarma
5. Evan. Manoj Kumar Debbarma
6. Evan. Sanjoy Debbarma
7. Evan. Ranju Debbarma
8. Evan. Utpal Debbarma
9. Evan. Biresh Debbarma

== Affiliated Churches ==
The affiliated churches with foundation date are listed below according to 2010 census:

- Chandranath (1974)
- Pointram (1979)
- Gorjung (1980)
- Moglam (1980)
- Gwngrai (1981)
- Jiten (1982)
- Madharam (1984)
- Anath Chowdhury (1985)
- Belchara (1988)
- Ghilatoli (1989)
- Basanta Kobra (1990)
- Khakchangma (1990)
- Maharani (1991)
- Thagur (1991)
- Chhanlwng (1992)
- Dophidar (1993)
- Gairing (1994)
- Sumanta (1994)
- Tagla (1994)
- Bathaka (1994)
- Chargoria (1994)
- Khowai Town (1994)
- Mosok Kami (1995)
- Bokomnia (1996)
- Yakhrai (1998)
- Bishnu Ram Sipai (1999)
- Mudilenga (1999)
- Lampra (2001)
- Monaikhor (2002)
- Kami Kwchar (2002)
- Uahlwng (2002)
- Bolitali (2003)
- Tulasikhor (2003)
- Behalabari (2003)
- Capital (2003)
- Haruaktali (2004)
- Twisa rangchak (2005)
- Baikuntho (2006)
- Balua (2006)
- Goyamphang (2006)
- Nisan (2007)
- Manik Chowdhury (2007)
- Athuk Twisa (2007)
- Mwtai Kami (2007)
- Naithok (2007)
- Tingaria (2007)
- Marchaduk (2007)
- Khaswrang (2008)
- Akhara (2009)
- Ampura (2009)
- Thailik Bwlwng (2009)
- Jalai Twisa (2009)
- Petra Kami (2009)
- Mayung kwthwi (2009)
- Tokchaya (1988)
- Sipai Hour (1992)
- Padmabil (2006)
- Harepkuar (2004)
- Mungia (1996)
- Bidhyabil (1990)

== See also ==
- Tripura Baptist Christian Union
- Baptist World Alliance
