= Mandwi =

- town
- Interactive map of Mandwi
- Coordinates: 23°51′39.9″N 91°28′42.0″E
- Country: India
- State: Tripura
- District: West Tripura
- Elevation: 69 m (226 ft)

Languages
  - Official: Kokborok, English
- Time zone: UTC+5:30 (IST)
- Postal code: 799045
- Vehicle registration: TR
- Website: tripura.gov.in

Mandwi is a town in the Sadar sub-division of the state of Tripura in the West Tripura district in India. It is in the Mandwi Rural Development Block.

== Description ==
Mandwi (Mandai) is settled over a hilltop. It was previously known as "Mandai" but its name was corrupted by earlier land recorders. It is linked with Jirania and Borokathal by roads. It is under the Tripura Tribal Areas Autonomous District Council.

The town has a mini-stadium along the main road to Jirania. There is a town hall also, where most of the local programs and functions are organized. Other amenities such as water supply, electricity, telephones and schools are also available.

== See also ==
- Borokathal.
- Shilghati.
- Khumulwng, the headquarters of Tripura Tribal Areas Autonomous District Council.
