= Khwichang Baptist Church =

Coordinates: 23.932°N 91.445°E

- Khwichang Baptist Church
- Country: India
- Language: Kokborok
- Denomination: Baptist

Architecture
- Years built: 1988
- Completed: 3 April 1988

Khwichang Baptist Church is a Baptist church located in Kutna Kami village area of Tripura. It has a strength of about 300 baptized communicant members. Pastor Biswa Kumar Debbarma is the local pastor. It is located just beside the road near the Kutna Bari Junior Basic School.

== History ==
Khwichang Baptist Church was established on 3 April 1988 on an Easter Sunday. It was inaugurated by Rev. Hnehliana, who was the then General Secretary of TBCU.
