= Agartala City Baptist Church =

Church in Tripura

Agartala City Baptist Church (Krishnanagar Baptist Church) is a Baptist Church in the city of Agartala, the capital of Tripura state in India. It is affiliated to the Tripura Baptist Christian Union (TBCU) and is located in Krishnanagar locality in the central part of Agartala city.

== History ==
The Church was set up in 1987 by some Christians leaders of that time. As time evolved the church grew in members and in faith. As of 2012 there are more than 130 registered members.

== Community ==
Pastor:

- Rev. Rana Kusum Debbarma

Deacons: Deacon Kajal Debbarma, Deacon Abhijit Debbarma & Chandra Mani Debbarma.

Committee:

- Secretary: Mr. Bilas Debbarma
- Treasurer:Mr. Chitta Ranjan Debbarma
- Youth Secretary: Mr. Pitor Debbarma
- Youth Treasurer: Ms. Elizabeth Debbarma
- Women Secretary:

=== Membership ===
There are more than 130 registered members.

== Affiliation ==
The church comes under the Jamilwng Pastoral Circle of the Sadar North Baptist Association of TBCU.

== See also ==
- National Liberation Front of Tripura
- Agartala Baptist Church
- AKSB
