= SNBA =

SNBA may refer to:

- SN Brussels Airlines, a Belgian airline founded in 2002 and merged in 2006 with Virgin Express to form Brussels Airlines
- Sadar North Baptist Association, an association within the Tripura Baptist Christian Union
- Société Nationale des Beaux-Arts, a group of French artists
