= Ranirbazar =

- City
- Location within Tripura Location within India
- Coordinates: 23.83°N 91.37°E
- Country: India
- State: Tripura
- District: West Tripura

Government
  - Type: Municipal Council
  - Body: Ranirbazar Municipal Council
  - Chairman: Smt. Aparna Sukla Das (BJP)

Population (2015)
  - Total: 15,820

Languages
  - Official: Bengali, Kokborok, English
- Time zone: UTC+5:30 (IST)
- Postal code: 799035
- Vehicle registration: TR
- Website: tripura.gov.in

Ranirbazar is a town and a Municipal Council in West Tripura district in the Indian state of Tripura.

== Overview ==
The town of Ranirbazar has many amenities like town hall, schools, market, motorstand, petro-pump and so on. Earlier, Tripura government had declared Ranir bazar as a municipal council area.

== Demographics ==
As of 2001 India census, Ranirbazar had a population of 11,003. Males constitute 51% of the population and females 49%. Ranirbazar has an average literacy rate of 77%, higher than the national average of 59.5%: male literacy is 82%, and female literacy is 72%. In Ranirbazar, 10% of the population is under 6 years of age.

== Location ==
Ranirbazar is located on the National Highway 8 (Assam-Agartala highway) on the banks of river Haora. It is half an hour distance from Agartala by vehicle. Nearby urban areas include Khayerpur and Jirania.

== See also ==
- List of cities and towns in Tripura
- Khumulwng, the headquarters of TTAADC.
- Udaipur.
- Sabroom.
