= Shilghati =

- Village
- Location within Tripura
- Coordinates: 23.521°N 91.407°E
- Country: India
- State: Tripura
- District: Gomati
- Tehsil: Kakraban
- Time zone: UTC+5:30 (IST)
- Parliamentary constituency: Tripura West
- Assembly constituency: Kakraban

Shilghati (also spelled Silghati) is a panchayat village located in the Gomati district of Tripura state of India. It is situated some 16 kilometers far from Udaipur, the nearest main town and lies on the banks of the river Gomati, which has its origin on the high altitudes of Boromura hill range.

== Description ==
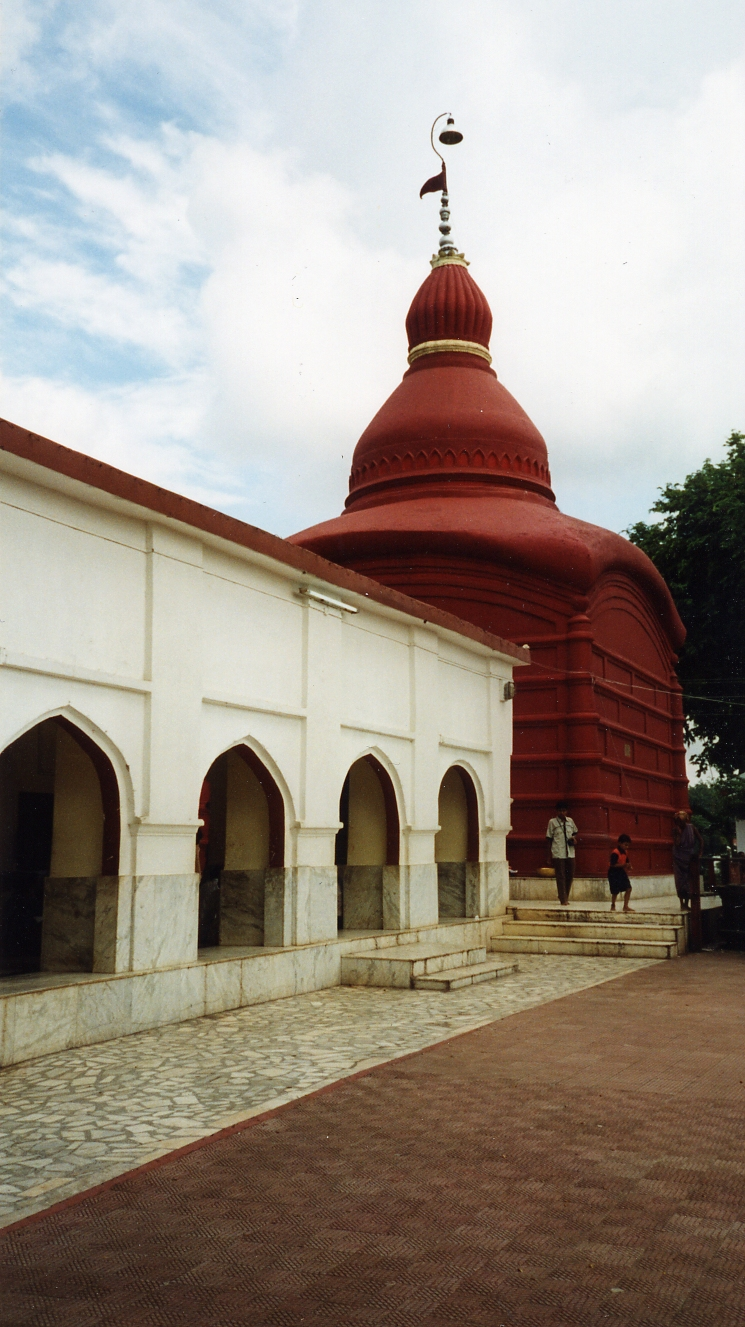
Tripura Sundari temple

The people here mainly belong to the Tripuri Jamatia clan of Tripura who speak the language Kokborok (Tripuri), the remainder are various Bengalis. It has a market located on the main-road linking Udaipur with Kakraban and Melaghar. It has lush green agriculture farms located around the settlements.

Amenities like school, post-office, telephones and electricity are available. Shilghati High School located near the Shilghati Market has been serving as the source of education for the local people from many decades.

== History ==
Prior to 2012, Shilghati was part of South Tripura district in Udaipur tehsil.

== See also ==
- Kokborok
- Tripuri people
- Jamatia Hoda
