= Jampui Hills =

Human settlement in India

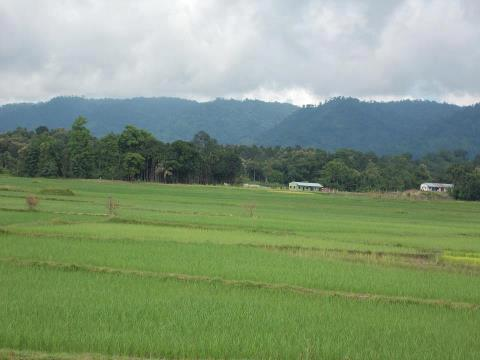
- View of the Jampui Hills in the East from the plains of Kanchanpur.

Highest point
- Peak: Thaidawr
- Elevation: 930 m (3,050 ft)
- Coordinates: 23°57′57″N 92°16′38″E

Naming
- Native name: Zampui Tlangdung (Tippera)

Geography
- Location within India
- Location: Tripura, India
- Parent range: Lushai Hills

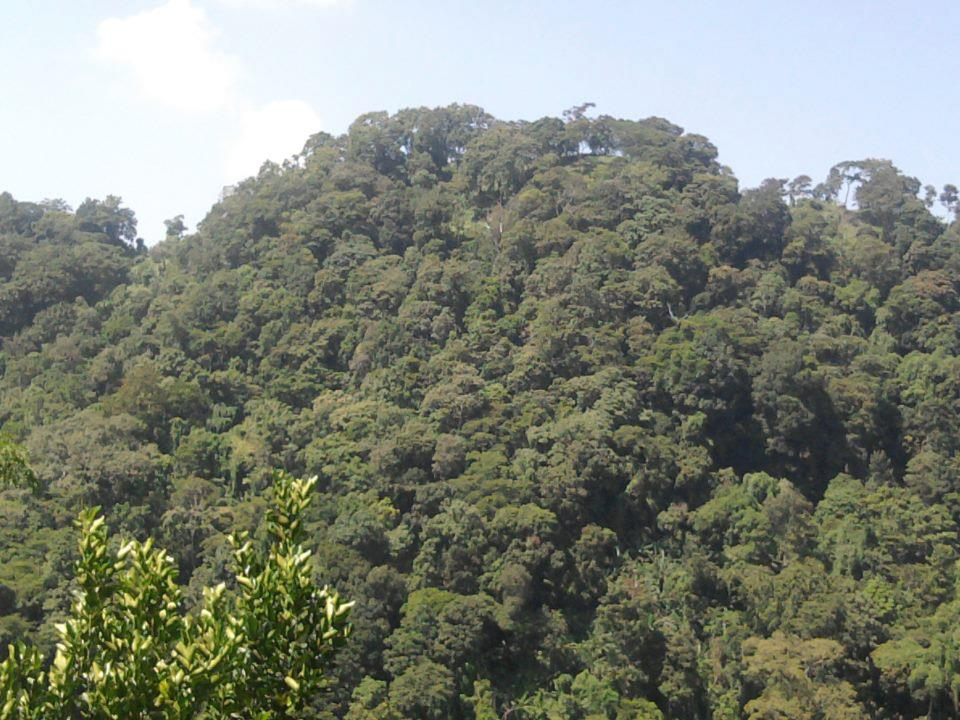
View of Thaidawr peak, the highest point in Tripura

Jampui Hills is a part of the Mizo hills (Lushai Hills) range located in the North Tripura district in the north eastern part of the Indian state of Tripura. The average altitude of the hill range is approximately 1000 metres above sea level.

== Geography ==
The Jampui Hills stretch from north to south and border the state Mizoram in the east. 930 m high Thaidawr Tlang, located on the southern part of Jampui Hills, is the highest point in Tripura.

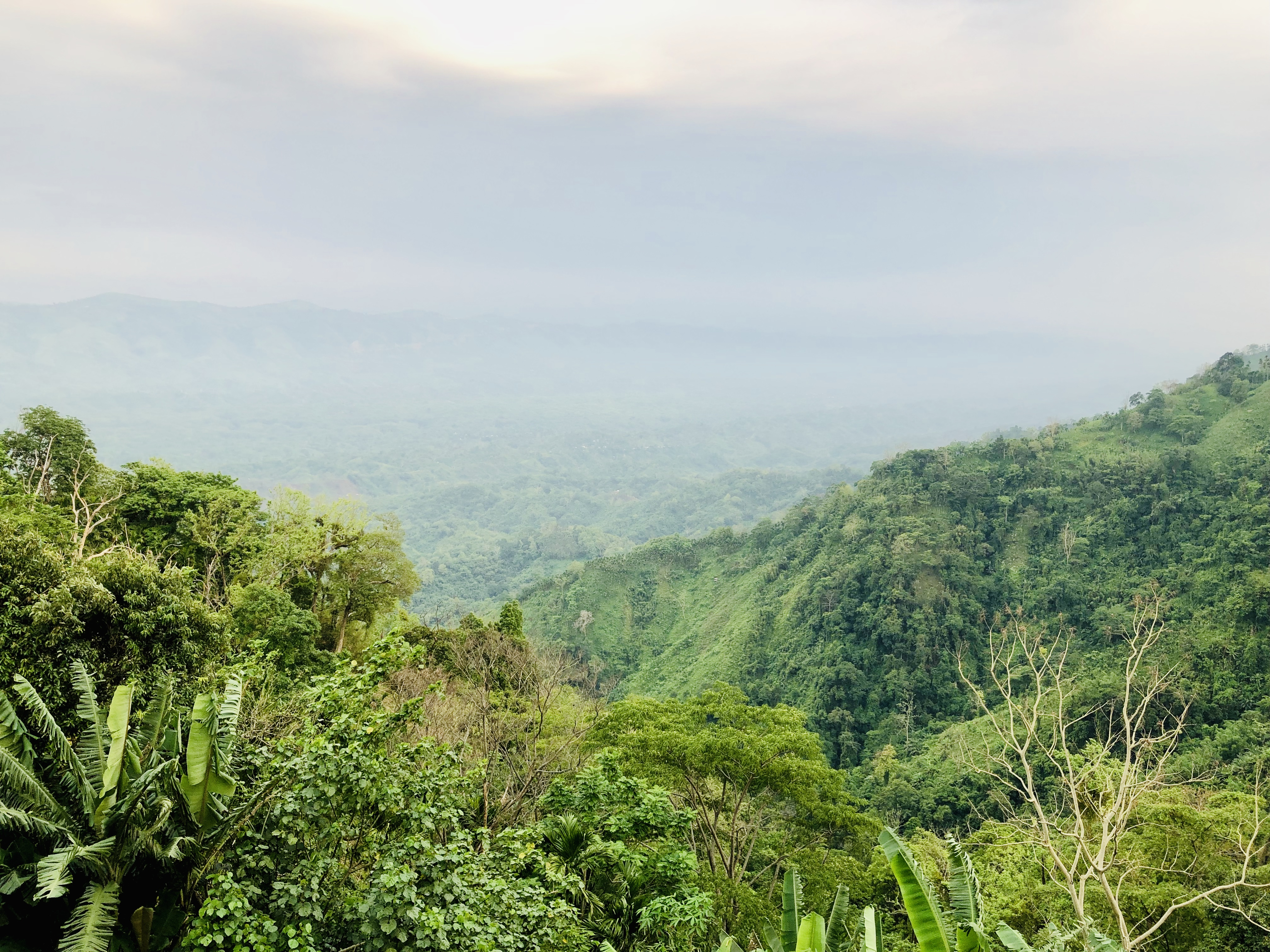
Lush greenery

There are 10 small villages in Jampui Hills and most of the inhabitants are the Mizo community. The villages are (from North to South) Vaisam, Hmawngchuan, Hmunpui, Tlaksih, Vanghmun, Behliangchhip, Bangla Zion, Tlangsang, Sabual and Phuldungsei. Vanghmun is the headquarters of Jampui R.D Block and there is a police station too. Besides these, Punjab National Bank and Tripura Gramin Bank have their branches functioning at Vanghmun. The whole of Jampui hills falls within Kanchanpur sub-division under North Tripura district with its headquarters located at Dharmanagar. There is a black topped road to Jampui Hills which is being developed to make it an interstate highway connecting with Mizoram. The nearest village, Hmunpui, is approximately 23 km away from Kanchanpur, the Sub-Divisional Headquarters.

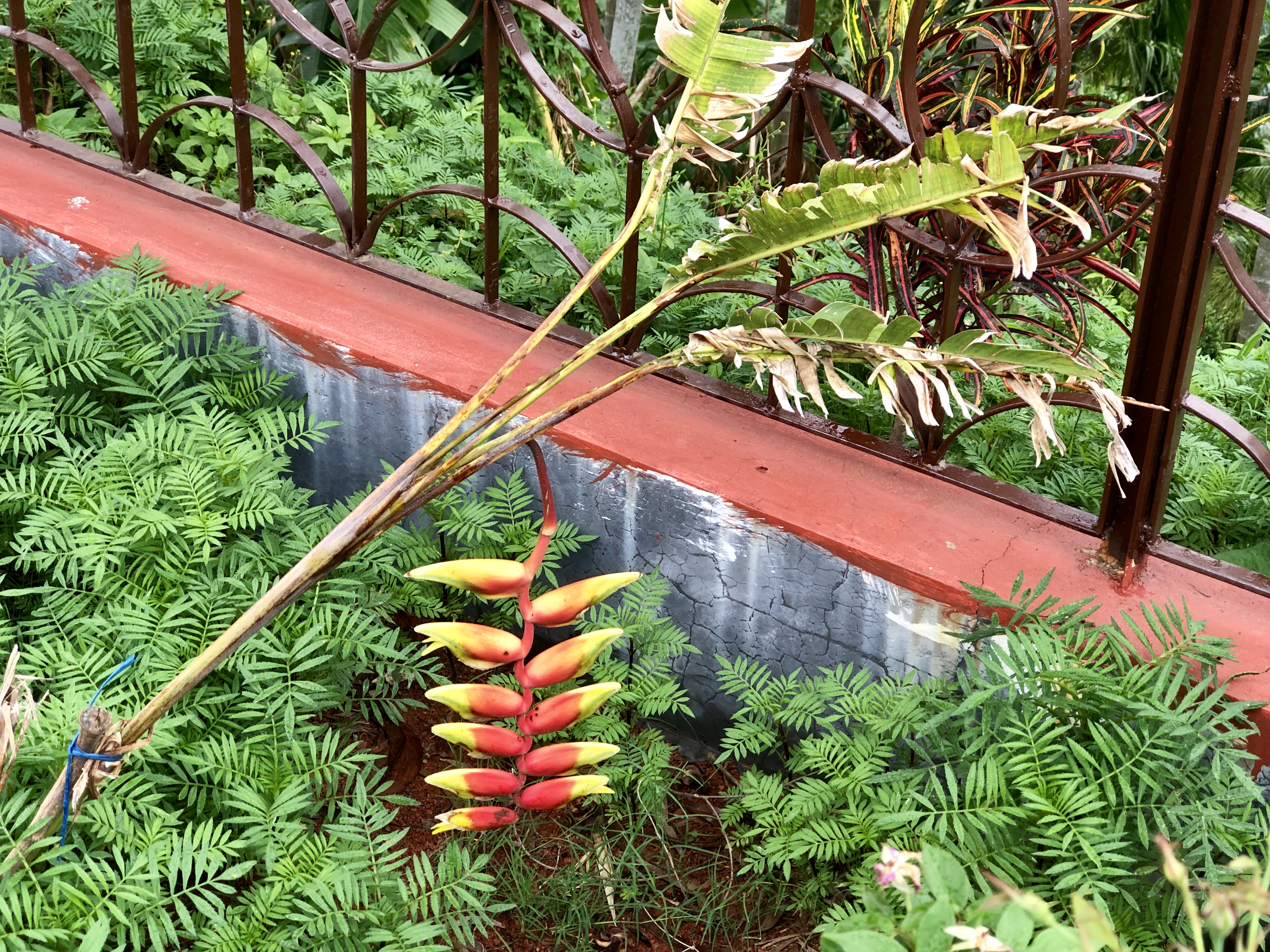
Local flower

The official languages in the area are Mizo, Kokborok, English and Bengali. Owing to the high priorities given to education, Jampui hill have produced many outstanding academics, officers, etc. in the state and other places. The first among the Mizo community (including Mizos from Mizoram, Manipur, Assam, Burma and Bangladesh) to passed an M.A. was Mr. Khawtinkhuma from Tlaksih Village of Jampui Hills. Many people in the Hills work in government service related sectors. The people of Jampui Hills are very hard working too. Despite geographical disadvantages, the people of Jampui Hills have succeeded in horticultural plantations like orange, betel-nut, ginger, coffee plantations, etc. on a large scale. These plantations are a major source of income for the farmers of Jampui. Orange plantation has been the major source of income for most of the families of Jampui but due to unscientific practices, the orange yield has declined considerably. However, fresh orange plantations are showing sign of success at Hmunpui, Vanghmun and Tlaksih villages. However, the southern areas of Jampui covering Sabual and Phuldungsei village are still yield maximum production of oranges even today. Despite many new concepts of livelihood, few families still practice the traditional jhum cultivation for their livelihood. Agricultural produce from these Jhum fields are sold in the local market and also outside the area. They are mostly organic in nature and highly prized for its taste and purity.

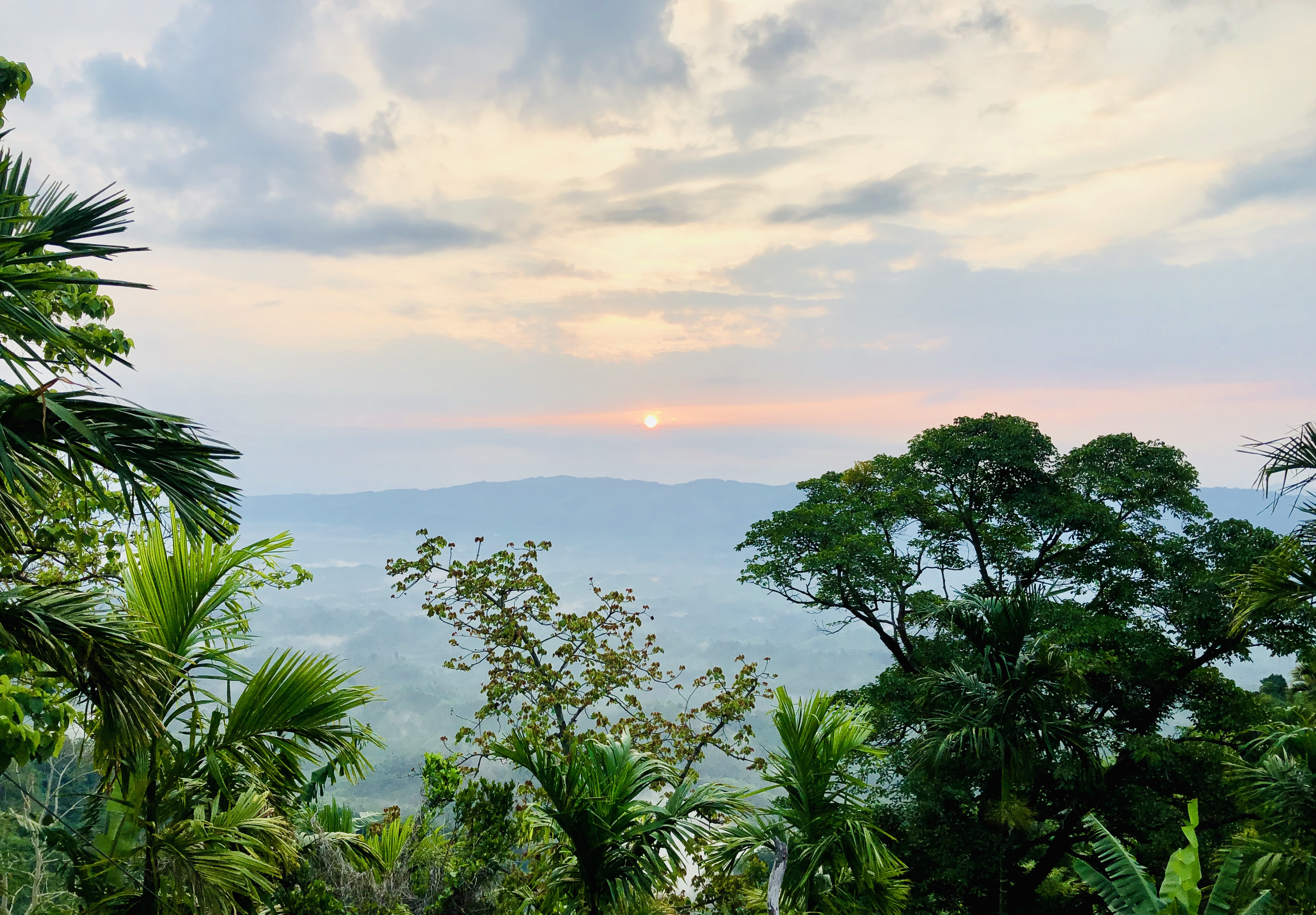
Sunrise in the jungle

== History ==
Jampui Hills was occupied by the Mizo people in the 16th century. Slowly they migrated westwards and entered into the interior part of Tripura and they were then called "Kuki" by the Tripuris. Descendants of these tribes are now called Halam community (a name given to them by Maharaja of Tripura). Jampui Hills was later occupied by another Mizo group under the Chieftainship of Zadeng, Rivung and Thangluah tribes (These are among the chief tribes of Mizo). Sibuta was one of the greatest Mizo chiefs in the 17th-18th century in northern part of Tripura, as mentioned in the Rajmala and in the book of Alexander Mackenzie. Jampui Hills was vacated by the Mizos in the mid-1800s due to a dreaded disease called "Zawnghri".The last batch of Mizo migrant settled in Jampui Hills under the chieftainship of Dokhuma Sailo in 1910 and Hrangvunga Sailo in 1912. In 1930, Dokhuma Sailo was crowned Raja Bahadur title and Hrangvunga, Raja Hrangvunga by the Maharaja of Tippera. Along with them, a wise and brave man Vungsakeia, a right-hand man of Chief Dokhuma Sailo was also crowned Montri title by the Maharaja. Since the beginning of the 20th century the Mizo continues to inhabit Jampui Hills peacefully.

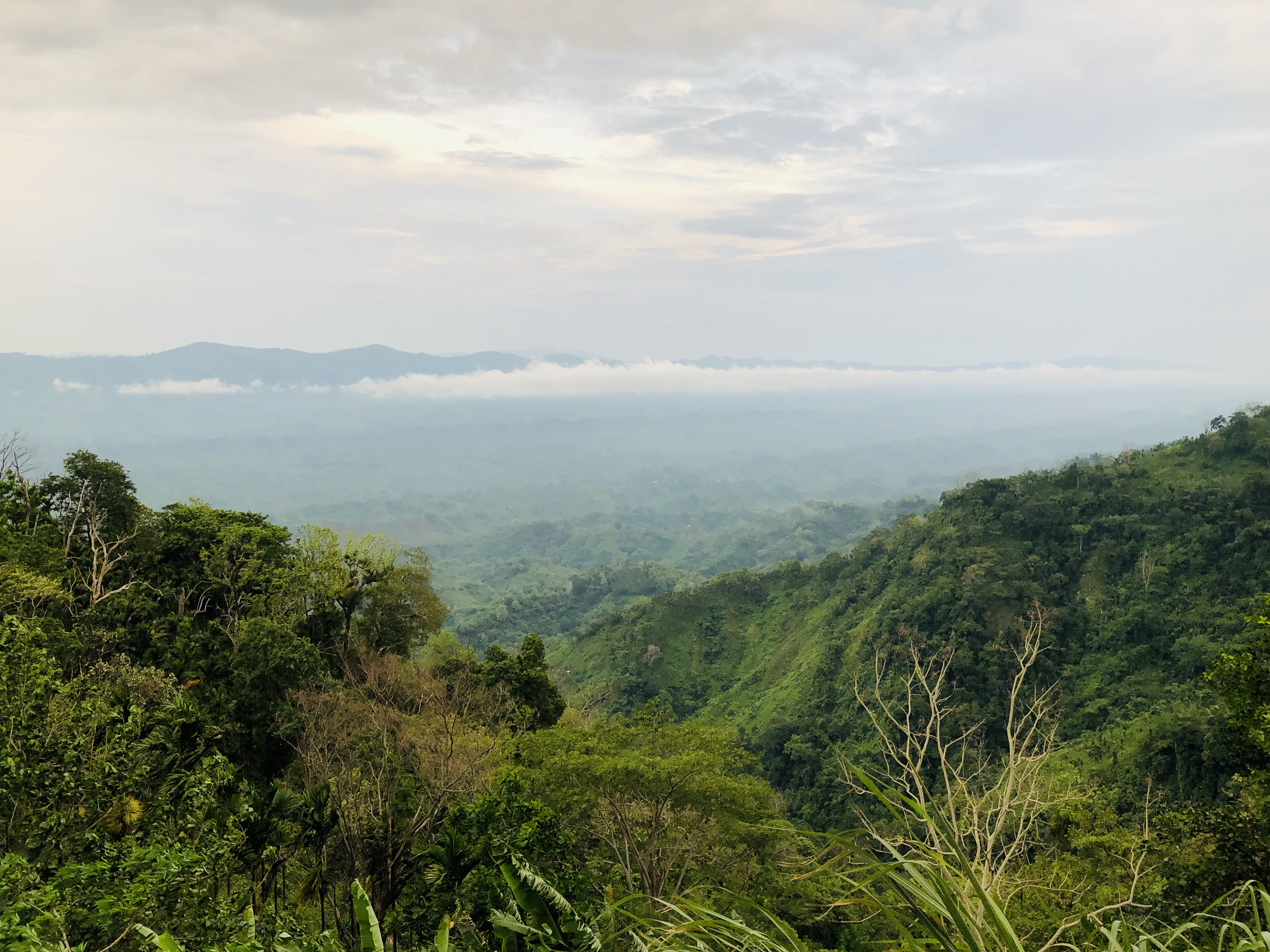
Cloud train in the jungle valley

=== Orange Festival ===
Orange plantation started in Jampui hill during the early 1960s. It began as a fruit plantation for self consumption. Later on, when markets opened the people realised the economic potential of oranges. New gardens were created and within a few years, almost all families started an orange plantation for commercial purpose in their lands. In course of time income from orange plantations drastically changed the economic conditions and standards of living of the people of Jampui. The quality of orange was so good that it won 1st position at fruits exhibition at New Delhi in the mid-1980s. Since then, Jampui became famous as a place where best quality oranges are grown commercially. With this recognition, more tourist became interested in visiting the area. So, for promotion of tourism, the Information and Culture department of Tripura started the unique Orange & Tourism festival celebration every year at Jampui hill. A large number of tourists, both domestic and foreign, participate and enjoy this festival. However, due to spread of orange disease like milky dew, dieback, and attack by pests, about two-thirds of the orange plantations has been wiped out. At present, Orange festival has been discontinued due to decline in orange productions and for other reasons. During this festival season, September to December, the hill is covered with floating clouds and it provides a rare experience for the tourists. The formation of clouds at the bottom of the hill range and its gradual ascendance from the bottom to the top slowly engulfing the whole hill range in its mystic lap is an experience to treasure. A new era of betel (Areca) nut, locally known as kuhva cultivation started by the people of Jampui since the last few decades. As the oranges are almost entirely wiped out, betel nut plantation extremely helps in the growth of the local people's economy. Just like oranges, betel nut are planted by most of the family for self consumption and commercial purpose in their land, grown and sold to many Traders coming from different places. Cultivation of betel nut thrives in Jampui and may have a huge potential even in the open market.

== Tourism in Jampui Hills ==
Jampui Hills can be accessed by road from Dharmanagar and Kailashahar via Kanchanpur. It can be accessed from Mizoram through Tuipuibari towards the South and from Kanhmun towards the North. Also, Helipad is available at Vanghmun and at Phuldungsei where Helicopters can land with ease.

The view of rising and setting sun from various view points in Jampui hills is a wonderful sight for the tourists. Tourists visiting the Jampui hill cannot afford to miss the view of the sunset and the sunrise. Various view points in the hill range provide excellent panoramic views of the valley and villages of Mizoram. From the watchtower at the highest peak,(Thaidawr) Balinchhip 'Ba'-a species of tuber, 'Lin'-to plant (in mizo), 'Chhip' -a peak (in mizo)(3200 feet above sea level), the Chattogram Hill Tracts, the Kanchanpur - Dasda valley other hill ranges of Tripura and Mizoram unfold an enigmatic scenic vista. Jampui Hills have huge eco-tourism potential which the state Government is trying its best to develop it.

Tourism Department of Government of Tripura has constructed one very modern tourist lodge- Eden Tourist Lodge at Vanghmun village in the Jampui hills which has a capacity of 30 persons and is well equipped with all modern amenities. Earlier, owing to limited seats, getting a seat at Eden lodge needs 2–3 months advance bookings during the month of September to March. At present, new buildings have been constructed besides the main Eden lodge to accommodate more visitors.

Mizo children in traditional attire.

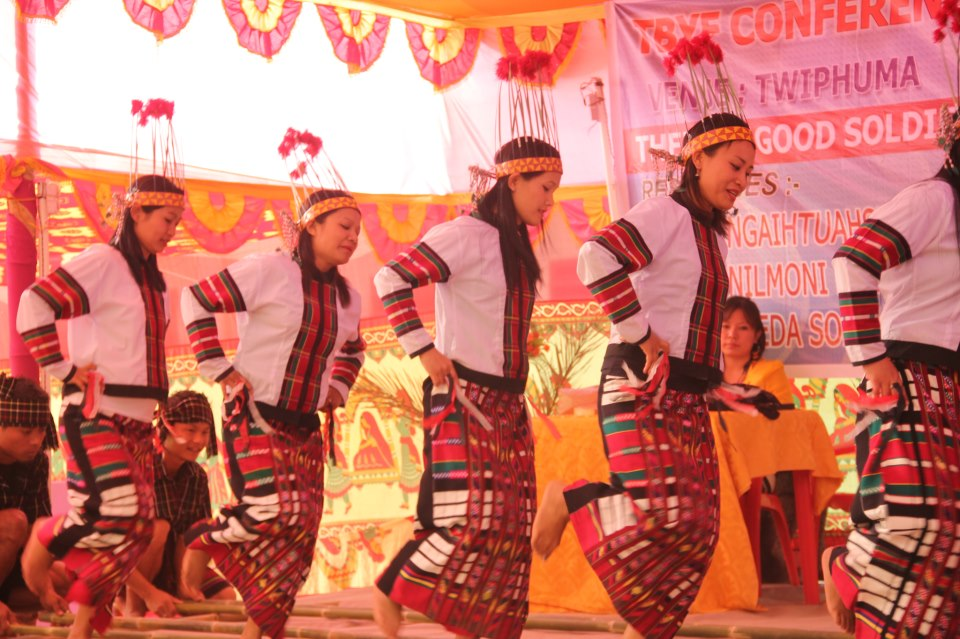
Mizo girls performing the famous 'cheraw' dance.

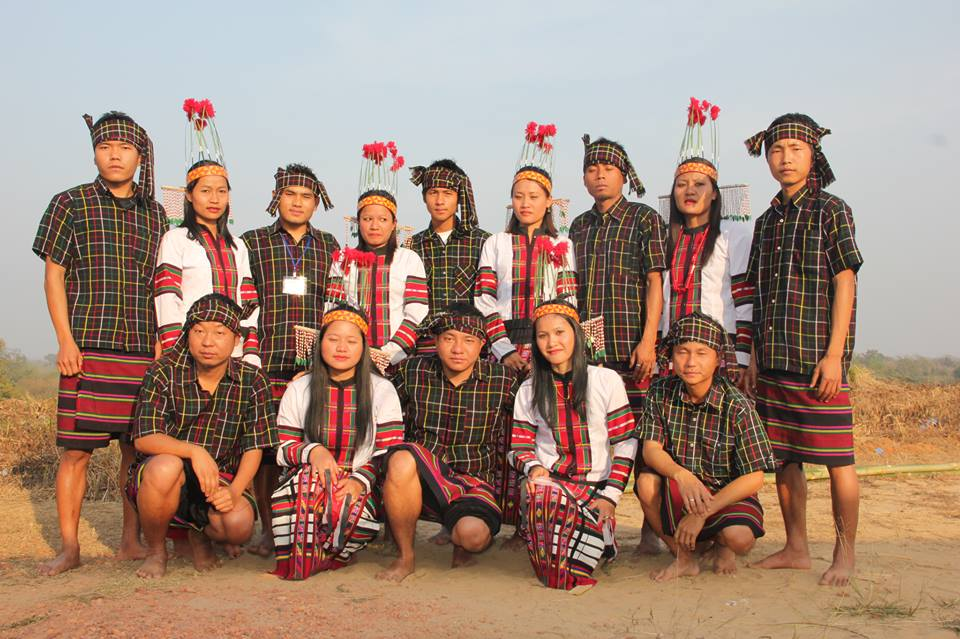
Jampui youths in traditional attire. A dance troupe.

=== Tour from Agartala ===
For facilitating the visit of tourists to Jampui hill, Tourist Department, Government of Tripura is organising various package tours from the capital town of Agartala. Jampui hill is a real tourist paradise which attracts a large number of tourists with its virgin forests and peaceful and eco-friendly ambience including beautiful orchids and colourful dance & music. Being sparsely populated it provides an ideal opportunity for leisure tourism. The tourist can visit the scenic villages, meet the people, interact with them and explore their culture and traditions. One can experience age old cultures and beautiful local dances like Cheraw " Bambo dance" as is widely known.

A beautiful sunset at Jampui Hills

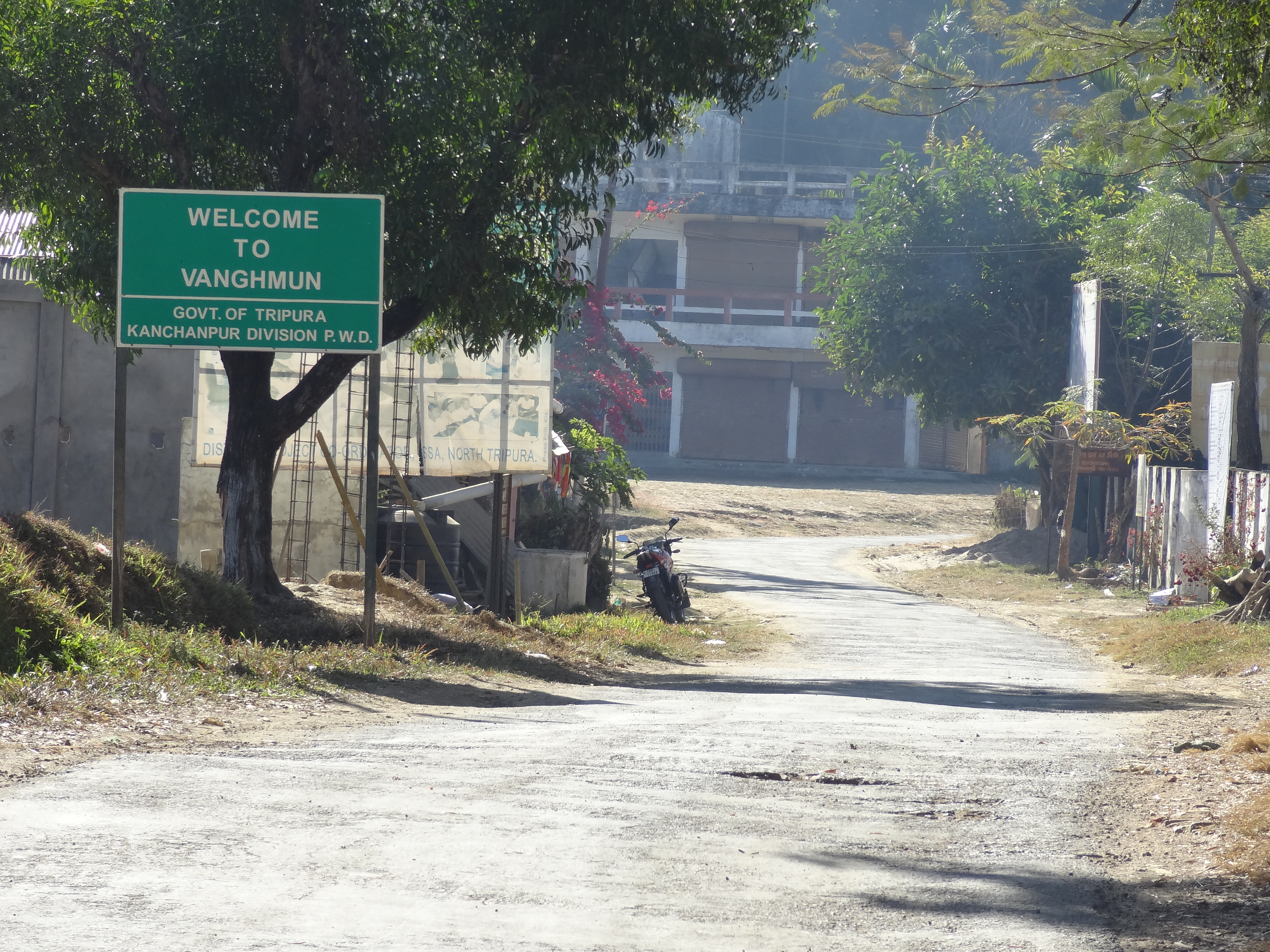
Vangmun, Jampui

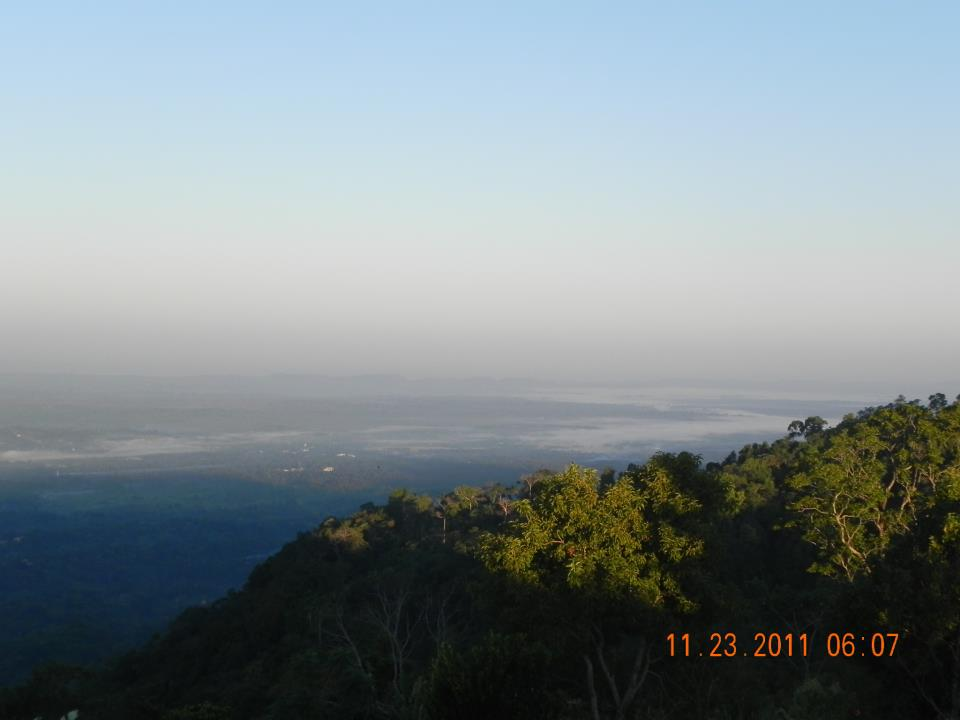
A landscape in the Jampui Hills

== Language ==
The local language is called Lusei țawng (ț=tr, trawng means "language"). The Lusei language is the common language spoken by the many Mizos living in Myanmar, Mizoram, Manipur, Assam, Bangladesh, Tripura and other places. Originally Lusei was spoken by only a particular group of the Mizos known as Lusei group, other Mizo groups speaks their own dialect. After a passage of time, the Lusei dialect became the most widely used dialect and is today the official language of the Mizo community as a whole. Bengali is known by most adults in Jampui though most are unable to read and write in Bangla. English is common and popular among the educated youths and most are fluent in speaking English.

== See also ==
- Jampui Sakhan Baptist Association
