= Jirania =

- Town
- Location within Tripura Location within India
- Coordinates: 23°48′14″N 91°28′07″E
- Country: India
- State: Tripura
- District: West Tripura

Government
  - Type: Nagar Panchayat
  - Body: Jirania Nagar Panchayat
  - Chairman: Ratan Kumar Das (BJP)
- Elevation: 45 m (148 ft)

Languages
  - Official: kokborok, Halam, Bengali
- Time zone: UTC+5:30 (IST)
- PIN: 799 045
- Vehicle registration: TR 01
- Nearest city: Agartala
- Website: tripura.gov.in

Jirania is a small town in the Indian state of Tripura on the banks of river Saidra (Haora). It is a Nagar Panchayat and also the headquarters of Jirania Rural Development Block. It is also the headquarters of Jirania Sub Division. It lies on National Highway 8 (Assam-Agartala Highway). The Jirania market is of great importance for the local business and its sustainance. The brick factories in and around Jirania are very famous, it serves for the town and its hinterland. There are more than 100 brick factories in Jirania Block. Jirania is the connecting link with the town of Khumulwng and Mandwi with the National highway. Other nearby towns include Ranirbazar and Champaknagar. One more thing that makes it famous is National Institute of Technology Agartala.

== Educational institutions ==
National Institute of Technology, Agartala is located in Jirania. It is located 4 km away from College Chowmahani, which lies on the National Highway connecting Tripura with neighbouring state Assam. It also has a Kendriya Vidyalaya primary school, Shishu Niketan Higher Secondary School (established in 1984), and Tripura Government High School, inside its campus.

== Tripura State Rifles ==
Tripura State Rifles, 10th Battalion Camp is located near National Institute of Technology Campus.

== Public transport ==
Jirania is connected to the rest of Tripura by Road and Rail transport.

Road transportation service in Jirania is provided by the local auto rickshaws and mini-vans, which ply from the campus of National Institute of Technology, till College Chowmahani. Other places such as Agartala can be reached using private mini buses and vans plying the route of Teliamura to Agartala. Buses to Assam can be boarded from College Chowmahani. Share auto rides are available for travel from National Institute of Technology Campus to College Chowmahani for Rs. 10 per head (as of May 2011).

Jirania has a railway station with four trains passing through it. Two local trains ply between Agartala and Dharmanagar and two long distance train which ply between Agartala and Lumding daily. The average speed of these trains are 40 km/h. This stretch of railway comes under North-Frontier Railways and is one of the very few stretches which still have meter-gauge tracks. Except for Lumding in Assam, Jirania is not connected to the rest of the India through Rail Transport.

To reach Agartala airport which is located around 30 km away from Jirania, local auto rickshaws can be hired.

== See also ==
- List of cities and towns in Tripura
- Khumulwng, the headquarters of TTAADC.
- Haora River
