= Sadar North Baptist Association =

- Orientation: Baptist
- President: Dhaniram Debbarma
- Headquarters: SNBA Office, Mission Compound, A.D. Nagar, Agartala, Tripura
- Origin: 1989; Tripura, India
- Congregations: 191

The symbol of Sadar North Baptist Association

Sadar North Baptist Association (SNBA) is a Baptist Christian denomination in Tripura. It is located within the West Tripura district of Tripura in India.

== History ==
SNBA started as a small circle within the Central Baptist Association of Tripura Baptist Christian Union (TBCU). It later on evolved and developed into a full-fledged association of TBCU with many churches affiliated to it. Today there are around more than 150 churches and fellowships within Sadar North Baptist Association. Some of the pioneers of the Baptist's in Sadar North is Life Deacon Biralal Debbarma (one of the first three Christians in the Kokborok speaking community and the ex-President of SNBA) and the Late Rev. Rabindra Debbarma.

=== Birth ===
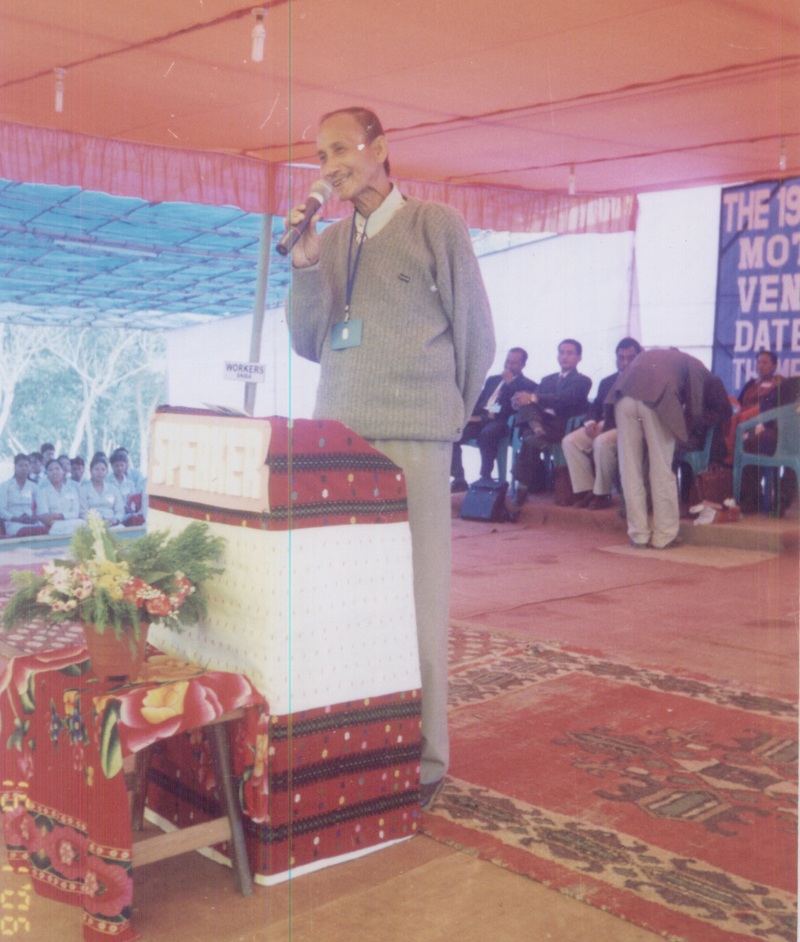
Life Deacon Lt. Birolal Debbarma, (ex-President, SNBA).

Before its birth as a full association the SNBA was one of the four Pastoral Circles under the Central Baptist Association. As churches grew rapidly with more new believers everywhere in the state, the Annual Assembly Session of Tripura Baptist Christian Union which was held in Subhash Nagar (North Tripura) on 23–26 February 1989 passed resolution that the Circles (e.g., South, Udaipur, Saisawm Sazai, and Sadar North) be given the full status of Associations. And it was how the Sadar North Baptist Association was established as an Association in the month of February 1989.

The leaders of the newly born Association with the presence of Rev. Hnehliana, the then General Secretary of TBCU, met prayerfully on 25 March 1989 at Durga Chowdhury Baptist Church and formed the first Executive Committee of the Association on ad hoc basis. The first members selected for the executive committee were:

- President: Mr. Birolal Debbarma
- Secretary: Rev. Rabindra Debbarma
- Treasurer: Mr. Chandra Kanta Debbarma.

== Faith and doctrine ==
SNBA is based on the principles of Baptist theology and doctrines and is strongly threaded and bounded by firm faith on Jesus Christ, Holy Spirit and the one and only omnipotent Father God.

== Organization ==
Rev. Dr. Chandra Kanta Debbarma, Former Executive Secretary, SNBA and Former General Secretary, TBCU.

Choir group from Mandwi Baptist Circle presenting a song in the 19th Sadar North Baptist Youth Fellowship that was organised in Abhicharan Baptist Church on 13–15 January 2006.

SNBA has the highest strength of Kokborok speaking Baptist community in Tripura.

=== Office ===
The association is led by the Executive Secretary, Rev. Barendra Debbarma, and has its head-office in Baptist Mission Compound, Arundhutinagar, Agartala.

The association is registered under the Tripura Baptist Christian Union (TBCU). The association is located within the West Tripura district of Tripura state in India.

=== Baptist Pastoral Circles ===
SNBA has nine Pastoral Circles, namely:

- Mandwi Baptist Pastoral Circle.
- Dakdu Baptist Pastoral Circle.
- Champaknagar Baptist Pastoral Circle.
- Abhicharan Baptist Pastoral Circle.
- Jamilwng Baptist Pastoral Circle.
- Khumulwng Baptist Pastoral Circle.
- Hezamara Baptist Pastoral Circle.
- Borkathal Baptist Pastoral Circle.
- Hatal Baptist Pastoral Circle

=== Sadar North Baptist Women's Society (SNBWS) ===
- President: Mrs.Anjali Debbarma(Agartala City Baptist Church)
- Secretary: Mrs. Ajali Debbarma (Agartala City Baptist Church)

=== Sadar North Baptist Sikla Bodol (SNBSB) ===
- President: Er. Sukumani Debbarma
- Secretary: Rev. Partha Sarathi Debbarma

=== Sunday School Committee ===
- Convener: Rev. Mangal Debabrma
- Member: Rev. Nilmani Debbarma
- Member: Ord. Evan. C. K. Chhoma.

== Affiliated organisations ==
=== Schools ===
The association runs four English Medium schools, namely:

- Yakhili Academy (in Khumulwng)
- Tipprah Academy (in Barkathal)
- Salka Academy (in Hezamara)
- Pohor Academy (in Burakha)

=== Hospital ===
The foundation for a new hospital under the association was laid on 30 September 2013 for which the construction is underway.

Sponsored by: Sadar North Baptist Women Society (SNBWS)

Location: Patni Village, Borokathal Baptist Pastoral Circle (around 20 km from Agartala city).

=== Institute of Community Transformation ===
Sponsored by Seva Bharat (Mission India)

Location: Madhab Baptist Church, Mandwi Baptist Pastoral Circle.

== Statistics ==
According to a census published by the association in 2023, it claimed 23,500 members and 191 churches.

SNBA Census

Description/Particulars	2001	2010	2025
Churches	84	129	185
Fellowships	5	7	3
Members	8,562	20,943	22,531
* Male members	4,411	11,203	
* Female members	4,151	9,740	
Minors	2,972	4,533	4,729
Government Employees	947	1,480	1,628
Christian Families	2,128	4,332	
Workers of SNBA	13	52	58
Pastors	8	10	38
Evangelists	4	27	19
Others	1	2	1
Deacons	77	183	341
Life Deacons	2	6	38

=== Missionaries ===
There are eight missionaries working in SNBA. Missionaries are mainly from four organisations:

- Baptist Church of Mizoram
- Evangelical Church of Maraland
- Jampui Sakhan Baptist Association
- Kailashahar Baptist Christian Association

== Affiliated churches ==
Some churches like Zion Baptist Church, Kisong Baptist Church, Jangalia Baptist Church, Abhicharan Baptist Church, Bhuban Chontai Baptist Church, Bagbari Baptist Church , and Khumulwng Baptist Church, have huge strength of members whereas others like churches like Roktia Baptist Church, and Rasu Baptist Church, have less strength of members.

The affiliated churches with foundation date are listed below according to the Pastoral Circles:

=== Abhicharan Baptist Pastoral Circle ===
- Kisong (1973)
- Dofidar (1977)
- Rajghat (1977)
- Durga Choudhury Kami (1982)
- Abhicharan (1983)
- Wala Kami (1983)
- Lefunga (1987)
- Sadhiram (1988)
- Kainta Kwpra (1990)
- Habildar (1990)
- Twisa Kwthang (1992)
- Mokam (1993)
- Bokjur (2002)
- Twisa Kwchang (2006)
- Rojong (2006)
- Kumaribil (2006)
- Phota Kami (2007)
- Raikanai (2008)
- Raj Chantai (2010)
- Kanto Kwpra (2010)
- Maikhor (2012)

=== Barkathal Baptist Pastoral Circle ===
- Debra (1978)
- Bosong thansa (1980)
- Borkathal (1986)
- Doigola (1987)
- Belphang (1987)
- Bargachia (1988)
- Khwichang (1988)
- Patni (1989)
- Yacharai (1991)
- Tokmakari (1994)
- Hathai Kwchang (2005)
- Chakhuma (2006)
- Khampar (2007)
- Bag Kami (2008)
- Radhanagar (2008)
- Salka (2010)
- Dugurai
- Urua Kami (2012)
- Twibru
- Twiraja
- Bokhorok Kiting

=== Champaknagar Baptist Pastoral Circle ===
- Khamting (1971)
- Bhrigudas (1977)
- Joynagar (1988)
- Jangalia (1988)
- Goyacharan (1989)
- Kulang Thagu (2013)
- Sobhamani (1990)
- Sinai Kami (1991)
- Maharam Sardar (1993)
- Hamari (1993)
- Rasu (1994)
- Rangking
- Sarat Sardar (1995)
- Roktia (1997)
- Debra (1999)
- Lalit Mohan (1999)
- Chokhreng (2003)
- Borduar
- Waraitwisa (2004)
- Duranta (2005)
- Uakjara (2005)
- Chandra Sadhu (2006)
- Immanuel (2007)
- Mang Kanto (2008)
- Rabicharan Thakur (2010)
- Nareng (2010)
- Thastwi Hatai (2011)
- Sambhusadhu (2012)

=== Dakdu Baptist Pastoral Circle ===
- Binon Kwpra (1975)
- Bhuban Chantai (1979)
- Madhab (1980)
- Sonamoni Sipai (1983)
- New Testament (1984)
- Boidya Kwpra (1986)
- Ramchandra (1990)
- Sibram (1998)
- Sridam Kwpra (1999)
- Chamathwi (2007)
- Sikwrai Kwpra (2007)
- Badramisip (2008)
- Thang Kami (2008)
- Lamkwthar (2010)
- Burakha (2010)
- Aitorma (2011)
- Kha Kwtal (2014)
- Boirwng

=== Mwsandwikhor Baptist Pastoral Circle ===
- Mwsandwikhor (1994)
- Garing Kami (1994)
- Shankhola (1995)
- Doldoli (1998)
- Chandranath (2003)
- Hasing Auar (2005)
- Matia (2006)
- Bethlehem (2008)
- Twisa Kuphur (2009)
- Bargatha (2010)
- Ganthalwng
- Dagia

=== Jamilwng Baptist Pastoral Circle ===
- Bagbari (1978)
- Bhati Fatik Cherra (1987)
- Agartala City (1988)
- Singlwng (1990)
- Gangalwng (1993)
- Jamilwng (1995)
- Kami Kwtal (1997)
- Hamari (2003)
- Kha Kotor (2004)
- Sipai (2006)
- Khampar kami (2008)
- Pohor (2009)
- Gamsa Kwpra (2010)
- Naran Kami
- Thansa (2023)

=== Khumulwng Baptist Pastoral Circle ===
- Kalasati (1976)
- Dashram (1985)
- Joygobind (1986)
- Khutamura (1987)
- Khakchangma (1988)
- Chichima Awar (1988)
- Muichingor (1990)
- Chhoigoria (1990)
- Bardhaman Thakur (1997)
- Khumulwng (1998)
- Langma (2005)
- Dula Kwpra (2005)
- Khasrang (2006)
- Galili (2007)
- Chukhani yakhili (2008)
- Immanuel (2010)
- Konai
- Hamkrai
- Bahu Chandra
- Khabaksa
- Gangaram
- Larima
- Hebron
- Yapri Kwtal Baptist Fellowship

=== Mandwi Baptist Pastoral Circle ===
- Thaiplok Phang (1977)
- Manikung (1978)
- Matham (1983)
- Mandwi (1986)
- Udai Kwpra (1987)
- Bishram (1989)
- Khengrai (1989)
- Sat Para (1996)
- Nepal Mura (1996)
- Naba Chandra (1997)
- Begram (1999)
- Lakhan Kwpra (2000)
- Bethel (2000)
- Baludum (2005)
- Hachwk Madhab (2007)
- Kanta Kobra (2009)
- Nolbogola (2009)
- Dondra (2015)
- Kherengbar (2010)
- Chhoigoria (2010)
- Chairgoria (2013)
- Emau (2013)
- Bokhiri (2013)
- Narayan kami (2016)

== See also ==
- Tripura Baptist Christian Union
- Baptist World Alliance
- Christianity in Tripura
- Jampui Sakhan Baptist Association
