= Sabual =

Village in Tripura, Northeast India

Coordinates: 23°27′N 92°36′E

Sabual is a village in the northeastern part of Tripura state in Northeast India. It is one of the ten Mizo villages which compose the Jampui Hills range under Kanchanpur Sub-Division. The District headquarter, Dharmanagar, is approximately 85 kilometers from Sabual. It sits at about 1000 meters above sea level. Summer is cool and the winter season is cold. The economy of the village depend on shifting cultivation and gardening.

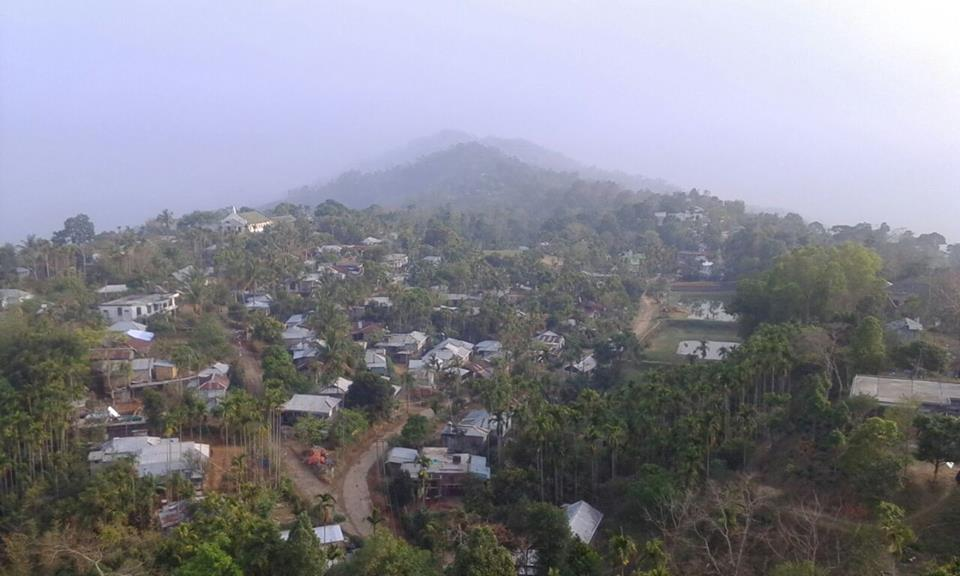
Birds eye view of Sabual village

== History ==
It is believed that the village was occupied by Mizo under the Chieftainship of Zadeng or Rivung tribes at around 17th-18th AD. But for some reason, it was later evacuated. The skeletal remains and valuables of the earlier settlers could still be found buried underground in earthen pots. However, it was reoccupied in 1918 by the Mizo chief Khawtinchawma Sailo. Lal Khawtinchawma Sailo ruled peacefully for over two decades. After his death, the village elders along with educated youths took up the work of looking after the welfare of the village. The Village Council (VC), a committee of elected elders of the village, look after the law and order and the Young Mizo Association (YMA), composed mostly of young people, works for the welfare of the people of Sabual village.

== Demography ==
The total population of Sabual village is about 1500. The Lushais or Mizos were the original inhabitants of this village. Reang migrants (also known as Sodhesi during the time) seek refuge under the village Chief Khawtinchawma Sailo at around 1935 and began to settle at Sabual village. A small number of Tripuris settled at Sabual from the year 1940. Lushai (Mizo) make up for 70% of the population followed by 20% Reang and 10% Tripuri. The village comprises around 300 families.

== Language ==
Most of the people speak Mizo (Lushai) language. Lushai language is the common language spoken by the many Mizos living in Myanmar, Mizoram, Manipur, Assam, Bangladesh, Tripura and other places. Although Bengali is spoken by mainly the adults, English is common among the inhabitants of Sabual village,

== Tourist attractions ==
The highest point of Tripura - Thaidawr tlang* (*tlang in Mizo literally means hill) also known as Betlingsib or Batlingchhip, is just 5 kilometres from Sabual.

Chapchar Kut, the most celebrated festival of the Mizos is celebrated every year during March.

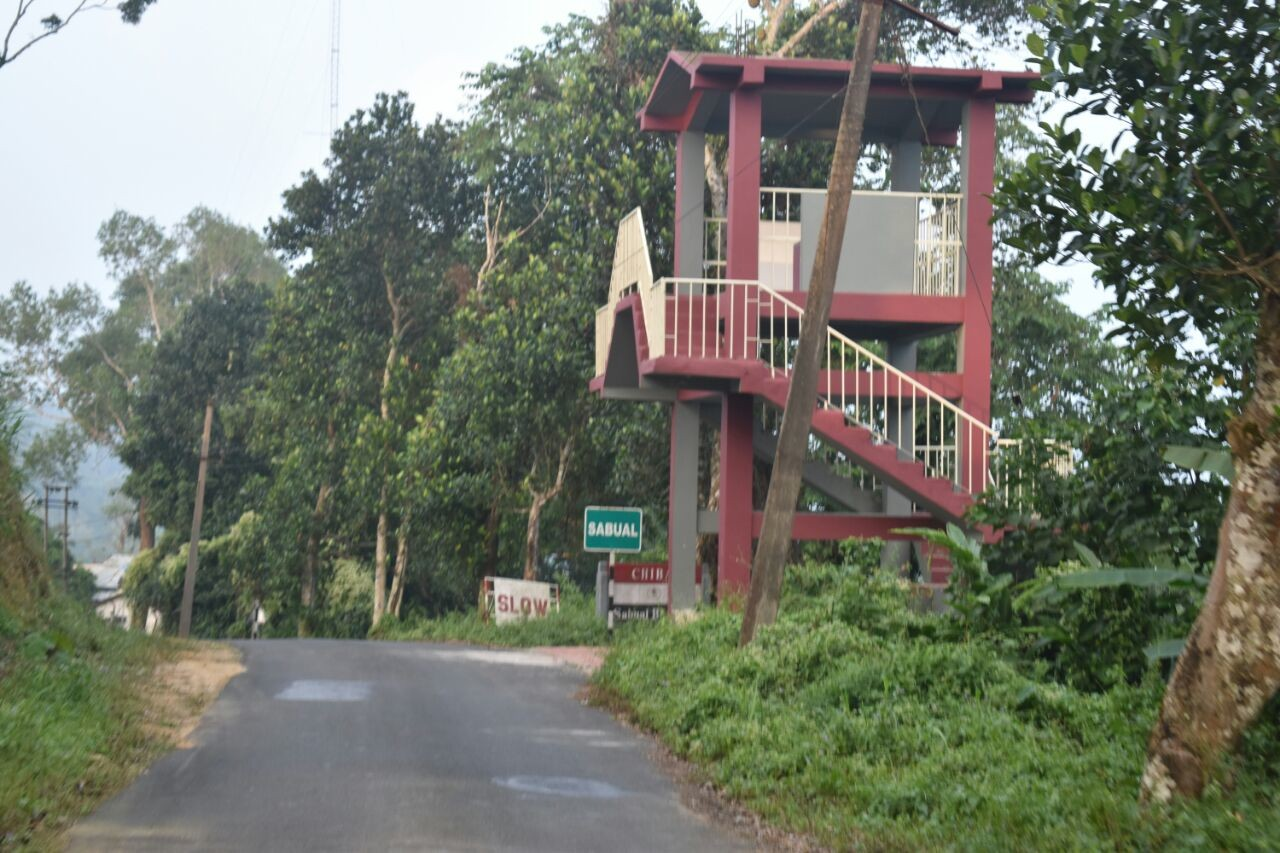
Way to Sabual village

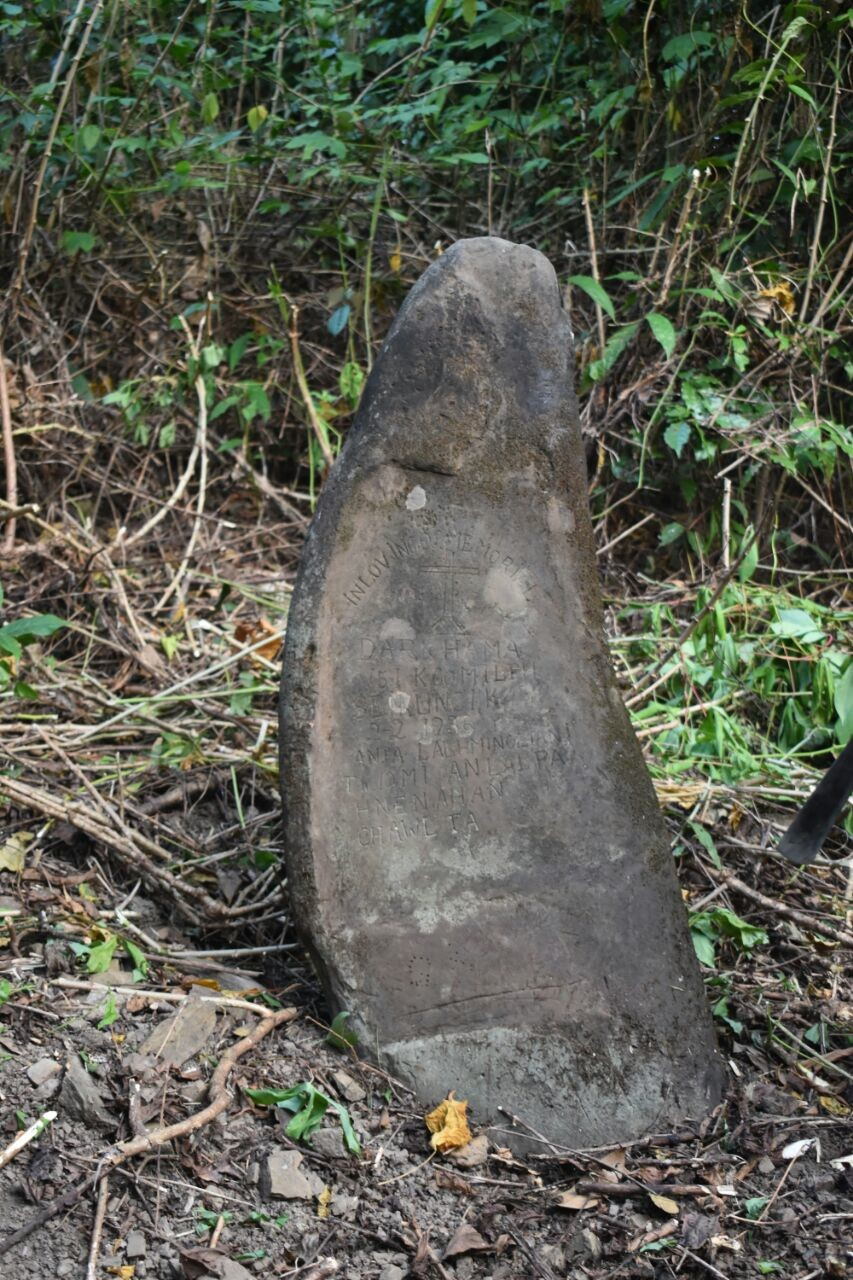
Chempai lungphun (Tomb stone found near Sabual village)
