= Sumli River =

River in India and Bangladesh

Coordinates: 23.9282°N 91.4711°E

Sumli is a trans-boundary river of Asia which flows through India and Bangladesh. It originating from the Damra Hills of Boromura hill range in the Indian state of Tripura. It flows through the villages of Boiragi, Chakhuma, Yacharai, Kutna Kami and the town of Borokathal. The Sumli continues into Bangladesh, its name changing to the Sonai.

It has been the source of water for agricultural farming in the Sumli Valley and has been a small source of fishing for the local peoples.

Every year devotees perform the Chhath Puja at various places including on the banks of the river at Salpur Kakraha Ghat in Suratganj area. In recent years, there were many incidents of people who go for bath, drowning in the river.

In 2019, the Tripura Urban Planning and Development Authority (TUDA) released funds to take up development work including the repair the river banks in the Mohanpur planning area.

== See also ==
- Tripuri people
