= Vanghmun =

Village in Tripura

- village
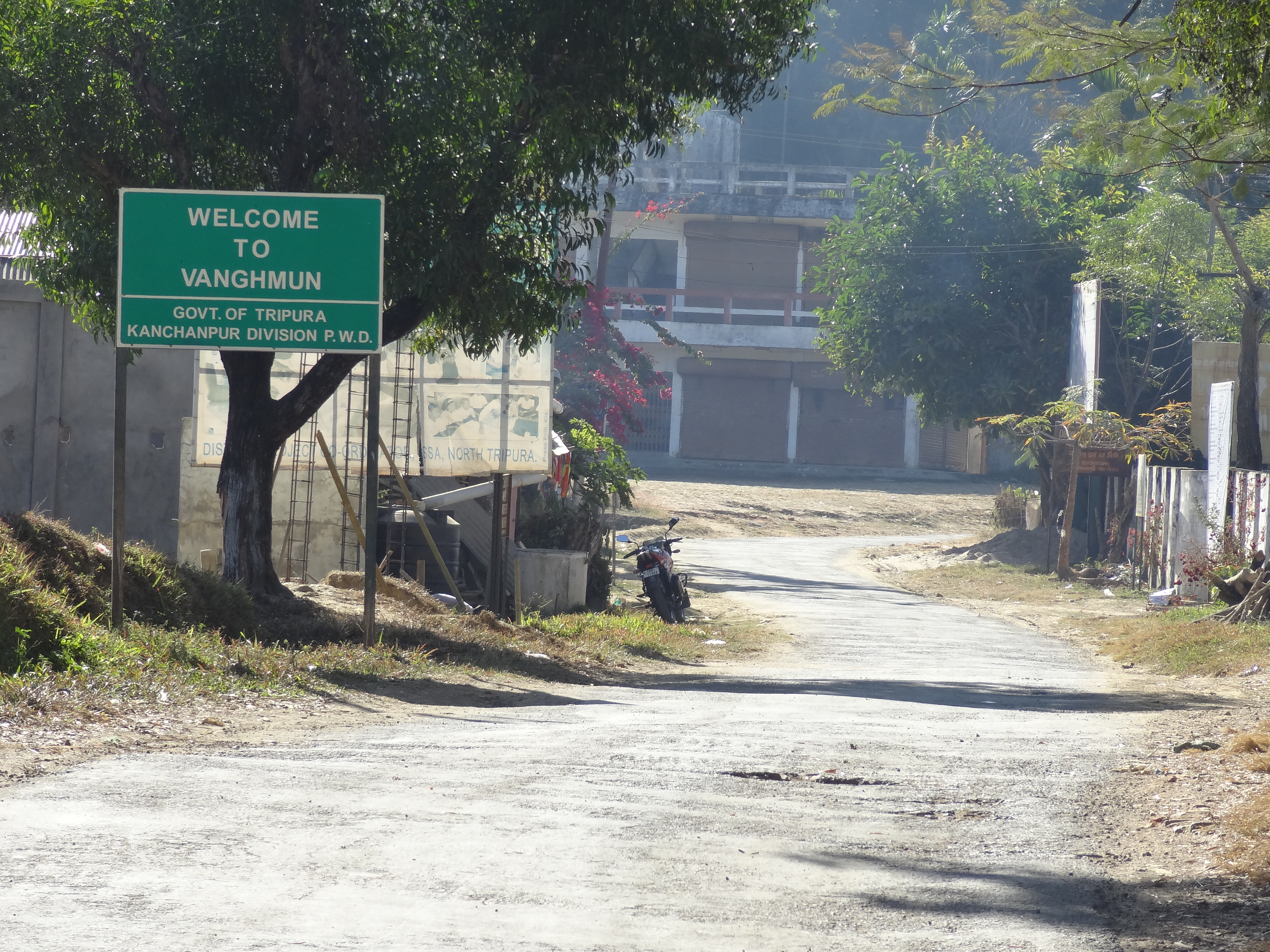
- Vanghmun in 2014

- Location within Tripura Location within India
- Coordinates: 23°59′19″N 92°16′42″E
- Country: India
- State: Tripura
- District: North Tripura district
- Block: Jampui Hills

Population (2024)
  - Total: 2,350
- Time zone: UTC+5:30 (IST)
- Climate: Am

Located at the highest peak of the Jampui Hills in Tripura in North East India, Vanghmun is a remote village notable for its cleanliness, earning it a reputation as the cleanest village in the state.

== Geography ==
Vanghmun is located 220 km from Agartala, the state capital of Tripura. Aizawl the capital of Mizoram is 55 km from Vanghmun.
