= Tripura State Rifles =

- Abbreviation: TSR
- Motto: Veerta Bandhuta

Agency overview
- Formed: 12 March 1984; 42 years ago

Jurisdictional structure
- Federal agency: India
- Operations jurisdiction: Northeast India, India
- Map of Tripura State Rifles's jurisdiction
- Governing body: Government of Tripura
- Constituting instrument: Tripura State Rifles Act, 1983
- General nature: Federal law enforcement
- Specialist jurisdictions: Paramilitary law enforcement, counter insurgency, riot control

Operational structure
- Minister responsible: Manik Saha, Government of Tripura

Website
- Tripura State Rifles

Tripura State Rifles (TSR) is a paramilitary force in the Indian state of Tripura. Tripura State Rifles Act was passed by Tripura Legislative Assembly in 1983 and on the basis of that act, it was established on 12 March 1984 to maintain law and order and assist the civil administration in the state. Its primary duty is to handle insurgency operations, maintain internal security and assist the local police in maintaining law and order. Different camps of it are present in the insurgency affected areas.

It has 12 battalions in Tripura and 9 among them are acting as India Reserve Battalions. At present, Its activities are not only found in Tripura, but also they are engaged in other parts of India.

They did a lot of operations in the state to counter various militant groups that have been active in Tripura in the past, such as the National Liberation Front of Tripura (NLFT) and the All Tripura Tiger Force (ATTF). Such groups are active in Tripura even today and for that TSR plays a pivotal role for ensuring peace.

The TSR operates under the administrative control of the Home Department of the Tripura state government. The force is trained in both conventional warfare techniques and specialized counter-insurgency operations. They work closely with the state police and other security agencies to combat insurgency and maintain peace in the region. It also works during natural disasters, elections, etc.
