= Abhicharan =

- town
- Location within Tripura Location within India
- Coordinates: 23.9126°N 91.4055°E
- Country: India
- State: Tripura
- District: West Tripura

Languages
  - Official: Kokborok, English
- Time zone: UTC+5:30 (IST)
- Vehicle registration: TR
- Website: tripura.gov.in

Abhicharan is a village in Sadar sub-division of West Tripura district of Tripura, India. The people here belong to the Tripuri tribe and they speak Kokborok. The government figure for the population is 2822. The village has amenities like telephones, schools, rice-mill, markets and also it is connected with the nearby town of Khayerpur via Kisong. It is also connected to Agartala through Kamalghat junction. A Tripura State Rifles outpost is located in this village, which looks after the security problems of this village, as this village is very strategic in location. It is situated right in the heart of Sadar sub-division. From here the villages of the interiors can be accessed very well through village unmetalled roads.

== Abhicharan Baptist Church ==
There is a local church, Abhicharan Baptist Church, which is one of the oldest in its area. The church is affiliated with the Sadar North Baptist Association. Many Baptist leaders have been from this village like the Late Rev. Rabindra Debbarma and Rev. Chandra Kanta Debbarma who is currently the Executive Secretary of Sadar North Baptist Association.

Vehicle services are available from Radhanagar motorstand of Agartala via Kamalghat-Lephunga road. It has a road connectivity with Sidhai-Mohanpur also.
