= Kisong =

- village
- Location in Tripura, India
- Coordinates: 23.899°N 91.386°E
- Country: India
- State: Tripura

Languages
  - Official: Kokborok, English, Hindi, Bengali
- Time zone: UTC+5:30 (IST)
- Vehicle registration: TR
- Website: tripura.gov.in

Kisong is a village in the central Sadar sub-division of West Tripura, a district of Tripura, India. It is about 5 kilometers away from the NEEPCO Power Station in Khayerpur. It is well connected with the Abhicharan village and the Durga Chowdhury village. The local church, Kisong Baptist Church, has been very active since its establishment and is also one of the oldest churches amongst the Kokborok speaking people of Tripura.

== Village people ==
The people dwelling in this village belong to the Tripuri tribe and speak the Kokborok language. Their livelihood is mainly agriculture-based. The staple food of people here is rice.

== Religion ==
The Kisong Baptist Church was established in the year 1973, where 80% of the people are Christians in this village. This church belongs to Baptist Liberal Denominations under the Sadar North Baptist Association. From this Church two representative workers work under the Sadar North Baptist Association. Until now, they both work as an Evangelist, Evan, Nripendra Debbarma (Joined:1 June 2009) & Evan, Somchati (Govt.) Debbarma (Joined : June 2011).

=== Church Office ===
Life Deacons:

- Sambhuram Debbarma
- Anil Debbarma

Deacons:

- Radha Mohan Debbarma (Former)
- Rabi Debbarma
- Subal Debbarma
- Sutrang Debbarma
- Bijoy Debbarma (Duration, 2012–2016 March)

[Secretary] : Joseph Debbarma (employee), [Treasure] : Dn. Rabi Debbarma. [Local pastor] : C.K Choma ( ECM Missionary). [Represented Worker] : Evan, Nripendra Debbarma & Evan, Somchati Debbarma. [Members of the Church] : 400 (Around). [Govt. Service] : (Above)-60.

== See also ==
- Kokborok
- Tripuri people
