= Kutna, India =

Coordinates: 21°03′N 82°47′E

Kutna
- village
- Interactive map of Kutna
- Country: India
- State: Tripura

Languages
  - Official: Kokborok, Bengali, English
- Time zone: UTC+5:30 (IST)
- Vehicle registration: TR
- Website: tripura.gov.in

Kutna Kami (Kokborok for "Kutna village") is a village located around 30 km away from the capital city of Agartala in Tripura state of India. The nearest town is Borokathal. It has a Junior Basic school and a church (Khwichang Baptist Church).

The village is divided into sub-sections, namely:

- Kutna Kotor
- Kutna Chikon
- Khwichang

The people dwelling here belong to the Tripuri tribe and their language is Kokborok. The economic activity is agricultural based. Rice is the staple food of the people here.

The village falls under the Tripura Tribal Areas Autonomous District Council.

== See also ==
- Debbarma
- Tripuri Dances
