= Tripura Baptist Christian Union =

Christian denomination in India

- Abbreviation: TBCU
- Classification: Evangelicalism
- Orientation: Baptist
- Polity: Congregational
- President: Rev. Anil Debbarma
- Associations: Asia Pacific Baptist Federation, Baptist World Alliance
- Region: Tripura
- Headquarters: Baptist Mission Compound, Arundhutinagar, Agartala, India
- Founder: Rev M.J. Eade, New Zealand Baptist Missionary Society (NZBMS)
- Origin: 1938; Laxmilunga village, Tripura
- Congregations: 1,079
- Members: 120,070
- Official website: christiantbcu.org

The Tripura Baptist Christian Union (TBCU) is a Baptist Christian denomination in Tripura, India. It has its head office in Agartala, the state capital. The TBCU is affiliated to the Asia Pacific Baptist Federation (APBF) and the Baptist World Alliance (BWA). It is also a member church of the North East India Christian Council (NEICC), a regional church body of the National Council of Churches in India (NCCI).

== History ==
The union was formed under the leadership of Rev. M.J. Eade in December 1938 in Lakshmilunga, a village six miles from Agartala. TBCU was supported and funded from the beginning by the New Zealand Baptist Missionary Society (NZBMS), which also provided most of the staff till the 1960s. Since then TBCU has now become an independent indigenous self-supporting church organisation. Rev. M.J. Eade was appointed as the first General Secretary of the Tripura Baptist Christian Union. Rev. Lalhuala Darlong was the first national General Secretary.

TBCU employs many pastors and evangelists and runs community programs such as schools and dispensaries. Since the early 1980s, it has been working in partnerships with the Baptist Church of Mizoram (BCM) and the Evangelical Church of Maraland (ECM) from Mizoram. Both BCM and ECM have many workers in Tripura working as missionaries and evangelist/teachers in various TBCU churches and schools.

TBCU celebrated its Golden Jubilee and Diamond Jubilees in 1988 and 1998 respectively with much fanfare.

== Organization ==
Rev. C. K. Debbarma (Executive Secretary, SNBA) and Rev. Ngaituahsunga Darlong (general secretary, TBCU) during the Sadar North Baptist Youth Fellowship 2006 in Abhicharan Baptist Church

=== Office ===
TBCU has its office in the Baptist Mission Compound at Arundhutinagar, Agartala.

The Mission Compound was established in 1938 under an official land grant by the then King of Tripura Kingdom, Maharaja Bir Bikram Kishore Manikya, to the Baptist missionaries from New Zealand.

=== Associations ===
It has the following

- Sadar North Baptist Association (SNBA)
- Central Baptist Association (CBA)
- Kok Baptist Association (KOKBA)
- Udaipur Baptist Association(UBA)
- Salgra Baptist Association (SBA)
- Kailashahar Baptist Christian Association (KBCA)
- Jampui Sakhan Baptist Association (JSBA)
- Tripura Baptist A'chik Krima
- Yarong Baptist Christian Association (YBCA)
- Saisawm Sazai Baptist Association (SSBA)
- Dharmanagar-Longai Baptist Association (DLBA)
- Yapri Baptist Association (YBA)
- Kamalpur Baptist Association (KBA)
- Songang Baptist Christian Association (SBCA)
- Dergang Baptist Association (DBA)
- Jampui Longkai sakhan Baptist Association (JLSBA)
- Hachwk Haphar Baptist Association(HHBA)
- Raima Sorma Baptist association(RSBA)
- Bishramganj Baptist Association(BBA)

Every year a meeting of the Council Members of the TBCU is organised at one of the churches within the Union.

== Schools ==
=== Union ===
==== St. Paul's School ====
The TBCU runs the St. Paul's School which is situated in Arundhutinagar, Agartala. The school was started in the early 1940s as the first English medium school in the Kingdom of Tripura.

Currently, the Principal of the School is Mrs Manjuri Sangma and the Vice-Principal is Mr. James Muankima.

The school is a higher secondary school with classes from K.G. to Class XII. It is affiliated to CISCE.

Darchawi S.B Bengali medium school, at Darchawi village in Unakoti district of Tripura, was also developed by the NZBMS with the financial aid of the Government of Tripura.

=== SNBA ===
The association runs four English Medium schools, namely:

==== Tipprah Academy ====
Tipprah Academy is a higher secondary school in Barkathal affiliated to the TBSE, offering classes from LKG-XII.

==== Salka Academy ====
Salka Academy is located in Hezamara

==== Subrai Academy ====
Subrai Academy is located in Burakha, under the Burakha IS. mandwi block west Tripura, 799035. The school was established in 2010. English medium school class provide Nursary LKG to class VIII (Eight) The school is affiliated by Tripura Govt., recognized and run by SNBA.

Haptorpha Academy

hamtorpha Academy is located in Champak Nagar area.

Langma Academy

Langma Academy is located in Langma hathai, Abhicharan area.

=== CBA ===
==== St. Peter's School ====
St Peter's School is located in Jampuijala Block, Sepahijala District of Tripura and is run by the Central Baptist Association of TBCU. It was established in 1991.

=== KOKBA ===
==== Kok English Medium School ====
Kok English Medium School is located in Baijal bari, Khowai District. The school is affiliated to TBSE for Nursery to Class -X. It is run by KOKBA.

=== Udaipur Baptist Association(UBA) ===
==== St. John's Senior Secondary School ====
St John's High School is located in Raio, Killa, Udaipur, Gomoti Tripura. It was established in 1972. The school is affiliated to CBSE for Nursery to Class -XII. It is run by Borok Hoda Thong(BHT).

==== Elem English School ====
Elem English School is located in Dulukma, Amarpur, Gomoti Tripura . The school is affiliated to TBSE for Nursery to Class -X. It is run by Baptist Church of Mizoram(BCM).

==== Hamari English School ====
Hamari English School is located in Bangphur, Amarpur, Gomati Tripura. The school is affiliated to TBSE for Nursery to Class-VIII. It is also run by BCM.

==== Nograi Mission English School ====
Nograi Mission English School(NMES) is located is located in Nograi, Ompi, Gomoti Tripura. The school is affiliated to CBSE for Nursery to Class -VIII. It is run by Chekiye Village Baptist Church(CVBC), Nagaland.

=== Salgra Baptist Association(SBA) ===
==== Ebenezer High School ====
Ebenezer High School is located in Twiphuma, Manubazar, South Tripura District of Tripura. It was established in 1983. The school is affiliated to the Central Board of Secondary Education (CBSE).

=== Saisawm Sazai Baptist Association (SSBA) ===
==== St. James Higher Secondary School ====
St James Higher Secondary School is located in Gongrai Molsom village, P.O Kendraichera, Sepahijala Dist. Tripura. It was established in 1980. The school is mainly for the scheduled Tribes students. The school is affiliated to the Central Board of Secondary Education For KG to Class - X is affiliated to CBSE and For Class - XI & XII it is affiliated to TBSE.

==== Nazareth English School ====
Nazareth English School is Located in Tuidu Bazar, Gomati District, Tripura. Mainly For Classes from KG to Class VIII.

=== JSBA ===
The JSBA currently runs two schools.

==== St. Thomas English Medium School ====
St. Thomas English Medium School, located at Vanghmun village, was established in 1979. It educates to the mostly scheduled Tribes students living in and around Jampui hill. Pu Lalnunsanga is the headmaster of the school. The school has KG to Class X standards. The school is affiliated to the Tripura Board of School education (TBSE). Every year a considerable number of Madhyamik students appear for their examination and come out with flying colors. The school has contributed greatly to the educational development of the people of Jampui hill. It has a boarding house for both male and female students. A stipend is provided by the Tribal Welfare Department of Tripura, through which each year a number of poor students can pursue their educational careers at the school.

==== Pohor English Medium School ====
Pohor English Medium school was established in 2008 at Chawmanu under Chailengta Sub-Division of Dhalai District.

== Theological Institution ==
=== Tripura Theological College ===
The TBCU runs Tripura Theological College for courses in the Bachelor of Theology (B.Th) which is affiliated by the Senate of Serampore College (University) from its mission compound in Agartala where mission workers are trained in Biblical doctrines and other theological studies. Presently, Rev. Bishu Kumar Debbarma is the principal of the college.

== Hospital ==
Earlier, the TBCU ran its own hospital at their headquarters from the 1930s until 1980 when it was discontinued, providing free treatment to the people of the state.

Presently under SNBA, a hospital is being constructed at Kaya Haduk, Patni village of West Tripura around 20 km from Agartala city.

== Social service ==
Since its inception. the TBCU has been supporting several voluntary NGOs dedicated to the development of the poor tribals living in the remote hamlets of Tripura.

=== Institute of Community Transformation ===
- Sponsored by Seva Bharat (Mission India)

Location: Madhab Baptist Church, Mandwi Baptist Pastoral Circle

== Publications ==
=== Bibles ===
TBCU in partnership with the Bible Society of India has been active in translating the Bible and New Testament in various local languages of Tripura.

==== Smai Kwtal ====
The New Testament of the Bible in Kokborok language, the dialect of the native people of Tripura was first published in 1976.

The translation team were:

- Rev. B.K. Smith, NZBMS
- Rev. Jong Bahadur Debbarma, TBCU
- Ramesh Debbarma, TBCU

==== Baibel Kthar ====
The Bible in Kaubru dialect for the Bru people called Bible kthar that is meaning Holy Bible. The New Testament called SMAIKTA and the OLD Testament called SMAIKCHAM. The translation by Rev. S.K. MSHA, and his team which was published by the Bible Society of India in 2011.

==== Baibel Kwthar ====
The full Holy Bible in Kokborok language was published for the first time in 2013 by the Bible Society of India.

The TBCU translation team were:

- Rev. Jong Bahadur Debbarma, CBA
- Rev. Anil Debbarma, CBA
- Rev. Nilmani Debbarma, SNBA
- Mark Debbarma, CBA
- Chitta Debbarma, SNBA
- Dn. Chitta Ranjan Debbarma, SNBA

=== Dan Thar ===
The New Testament of the Bible in (Molsom) language the dialect of the native people of Tripura. The translation team were:

- (Late) Rev. Misilkumar Molsom
- Rev. Sonabahadur Molsom
- Decon. Lalkunga Molsom
- Decon. C L. Nunhlima
- Rev. Mosia Molsom

=== Literature ===
Under the Tripura Baptist Christian Literature Committee and the Kokborok Christian Literature Committee (KCLC) various songbooks, tracts and study materials are regularly published by the TBCU.

== Statistics ==
According to a census published by the association in 2023, it claimed 84,795 members in 943 churches.

Sl. No.	Association	Churches	Members
1.	Sadar North Baptist Association (SNBA)	188	27,260
2.	Central Baptist Association (CBA)	92	6,500
3.	Udaipur Baptist Association (UBA)	92	7,190
4.	Kok Baptist Association (KOKBA)	85	6,284
5.	Yarung Baptist Christian Association (YBCA)	27	3,298
6.	Salgra Baptist Association (SBA)	55	8,179
7.	Yapri Baptist Association (YBA)	39	2,271
8.	Kailasahar Baptist Christian Association (KBCA)	81	11,100
9.	Dergang Baptist Association (DBA)	84	8,555
10.	Dharmanagar Longai Baptist Association (DLBA)	27	3,185
11.	Kamalpur Baptist Association (KBA)	33	2,298
12.	Jampui Longai Baptist Association (JLBA)	37	4,269
13.	Songang Baptist Christian Association (SBCA)	11	659
14.	Jampui Sakhan Baptist Association (JSBA)	11	6,700
15.	Tripura Baptist A'chik Krima (TBAK)	31	3,987
16.	Saizawm Sazai Baptist Association (SSBA)	84	13,606
17.	Hachuk Haphar Baptist Association (HHBA)	34	2,187
18.	Bishramganj Baptist Association (BBA)	38	2,542

Choir group from Mandwi Baptist Circle, Sadar North Baptist Association (SNBA)

== Office bearers of TBCU ==
=== Union ===
- General Secretary: Rev. Dr. Dohoram Reang
- Associate General Secretary: Rev. Parimal Kaipeng
- Secretary: Rev. Apurba Debbarma

==== Presidents ====
The list of presidents of the Union are as follows:

Sl. No.	Name	Year
1.	Mr. Abraham Sangma	1938-’39, 1939-‘40, 1940-’41
2.	Rev. Tikendra Ghagra	1941-’42, 1942-‘43, 1952-‘53, 1964-‘65
3.	Mr. Kamala Kanta Kubi	1944-‘45, 1945-’46
4.	Rev. L. Luaia	1946-‘47
5.	Rev. M. J. Eade	1947-‘48
6.	Mr. Lianthanga	1948-‘49
7.	Mr. Jogesh Rema	1949-‘50
8.	Pastor Sukla Kumar Das	1950-‘51
9.	Pastor Chawna	1951-‘52, 1953-‘54
10.	Mr. Dhirendra Sangma	1954-‘55, 1960-‘61
11.	Rev. Tlanglawma Darlong	1955-‘56, 1961-‘62,1969-‘70,1986-’87,1987-’88,1988-‘89
12.	Rev. Tawna	1956-’57, 1957-‘58, 1970-‘71
13.	Rev. Lalhuala Darlong	1958-’59, 1959-‘60, 1982-’83, 1983-’84, 1984-‘85
14.	Rev. B. N. Eade	1962-‘63
15.	Mr. Upendra Kumar Das	1965-‘66
16.	Mr. L. L. Rokhum	1966-‘67
18.	Rev. Lalsiama Darlong	1968-‘69, 1981-‘82. 1994-‘95
19.	Mr. Johana Darlong	1971-‘72
20.	Rev. Malsawma	1972-‘73, 1997-‘98
21.	Rev. Elendra Marak	1973-‘74, 1990-‘91, 1993-‘94
22.	Prof. D. L. Roy	1974-’75, 1975-’76, 1976-’77, 1977-‘78
23.	Rev. Lalrema Darlong	1978-’79, 1979-’80, 1980-‘81
24.	Rev. Rabindra Debbarma	1989-‘90, 1995-’96, 1996–97
25.	Rev. Dakshina Ranjan Reang	1991-‘92, 2003-‘04, 2005-‘06, 2019-‘20
26.	Rev. Jongbahadur Debbarma	1992-‘93, 1997-‘98, 2015-‘16
27.	Rev. Mishil Kumar Molsom	1998-‘99
28.	Rev. S. T. Pautu	1999-2000
29.	Rev. Anil Debbarma	2000-‘01, 2016-‘17
30.	Rev. Ngaituasunga Darlong	2001-‘02
31.	Rev. Zokhuma Rokhum	2002-‘03, 2006-‘07, 2014-‘15
32.	Rev. Ranakusum Debbarma	2004-‘05, 2012-‘13. 2020-‘21
33.	Rev. Kishore Debbarma	2008-’09, 2009-‘10
34.	Rev. Chandra Kanta Debbarma	2010-‘11
35.	Rev. Sangzuala	2011-‘12
36.	Rev. Nagendra Debbarma	2013-‘14
37.	Rev. Rajani Kaipeng	2017-‘18
38.	Rev. Jyotirmoy Debbarma	2018-‘19

=== Sadar North Baptist Association (SNBA) ===
Pastors of SNBA

1. Rev. C. K. Debbarma (General Secretary, TBCU)
2. Rev. Ranjit Debbarma (Executive Secretary, SNBA)
3. Rev.Chandramoni Debbarma (Secretary, Sadar North Baptist Association)
4. Rev. Kishor Kr. Debbarma (President, TBCU)
5. Rev. OfficO Kr. Debbarma
6. Pastor Mangal Debbarma
7. Pastor Manmohan Debbarma
8. Pastor Barendra Debbarma
9. Pastor Samendra Debbarma
10. Evan. Shikha Debbarma
11. Pastor Sitaram Rupini
12. Pastor Sushanta Debbarma
13. Pastor Pradip Debbarma
14. Pastor Mantu Debbarma
15. Pastor Kishore Debbarma
16. Pastor Bijoy Debbarma
17. Pastor Sukuram Debbarma
18. Pastor Nripendra Debbarma
19. Pastor Partha Sarathi Debbarma
20. Pastor Sandhyaram Debbarma
21. Pastor Rajkumar Debbarma
22. Pastor Mithun Rupini
23. Pastor Biswajit Debbarma
24. Pastor Nitya Debbarma
25. Pastor Manoranjan Debbarma
26. Pastor Kishore (Yarwng) Debbarma
27. Pastor Arun Debbarma
28. Pastor Ajendra Debbarma
29. Pastor Rwngthoma Debbarma
30. Pastor Joseph Debbarma
31. Pastor Manik Debbarma
32. Pastor Somchati Debbarma
33. Pastor Sunil Debbarma
34. Pastor Malendra Debbarma
35. Pastor Debojit Debbarma
36. Pastor Sachin Debbarma
37. Pastor Bijoy Debbarma
38. Evan Amit Debbarma
39. Rev. Dr. Bishu Kr. Debbarma (Principal at TTC)
40. Evan. Bharat Debbarma
41. Evan. Miss Ganga Debbarma
42. Evan. Shyamuel Debbarma
43. Evan. Shakti Debbarma
44. Evan. Bhajan Debabrma
45. Evan. Rescue Debbarma
46. Evan. Sanjoy Rupini
47. Evan. Ranjit Debbarma
48. Evan. Shyamal Debbarma
49. Evan. Pusurai Debabrma
50. Evan. Pitor Debbarma
51. Evan. Jacob Debbarma
52. Evan. Jiten Debbarma
53. Evan. Biman Debbarma
54. E/T Siari Debbarma
55. E/T Subasish Debbarma
56. E/T Jico Debbarma
57. E/T Adom Debabrma
58. Mr. Rabindra Debbarma (Driver)

Office Staff of SNBA

1. Mr. Pitor Debbarma (Accountant)
2. Mr. Binoy Debbarma (Office Assistant)
3. Mr. Alip Debbarma (Office Boy)

Ordained Evangelists of SNBA

1. Ord. Evan. Lalnunsiama (BCM Missionary)
2. Ord. Evan. Lalchungnunga (JSBA Missionary)

== Pastors and Evangelists working under TBCU ==
=== Central Baptist Association (CBA) ===
Pastors of CBA The pastors of the CBA are:

1. Rev. Jong Bahadur Debbarma (Retd)
2. Rev. Asit Debbarma (Retd)
3. Rev. Swapan Debbarma
4. Rev. Surajit Debbarma
5. Rev. Mohan Koloi
6. Rev. Anil Debbarma (Retd)
7. Rev. Ajit Debbarma
8. Rev. Tripureswer Debbarma
9. Rev. Sambhuram Debbarma
10. Rev. Swadesh Debbarma
11. Rev. Abiram Debbarma
12. Rev. Aprajit Debbarma

Ordained Evangelists of CBA

1. Rev. Sushil Debbarma
2. Ord.Evan. Ranjit Debbarma
3. Rev. Madhab Debbarma
4. Rev. Satyaram Debbarma

Evangelists of CBA

1. Evan. Dilip Debbarma
2. Evan. Premananda Debbarma
3. Evan. Laxman Debbarma
4. Evan. Ranjan Debbarma
5. Evan. Krishna Debbarma
6. Evan. Bitta Debbarma
7. Evan. Uttam Debbarma
8. Evan. Saitya Debbarma
9. Evan. Arup Debbarma

=== Kok Baptist Association (KOKBA) ===
Pastors of KOKBA The pastors of the KOKBA are:

1. Rev. Jyotirmoy Debbarma
2. Rev. Sunil Debbarma
3. Rev. Malendra Debbarma
1. Rev. Surnapada Jamatia
2. Rev. Dharmendra Debbarma
3. Rev. Samaresh Debbarma

Ordained Evangelists of KOKBA

1. Dhiman Debbarma

Ordained Evangelists of KOKBA

1. Evan. Philip Rupini
2. Evan. Kishore Debbarma
3. Evan. Manoj Kumar Debbarma
4. Evan. Sanjoy Debbarma
5. Evan. Ranju Debbarma
6. Evan. Utpal Debbarma
7. Evan. Biresh Debbarma
8. Evan. Mansujit Debbarma
9. Evan pradesh Debbarma

=== Udaipur Baptist Association (UBA) ===
The pastors of the UBA are:

1. Rev. Debguru Jamatia
2. Rev. Subraihamjak Jamatia
3. Rev. Chandra Bahadur Jamatia

Ordained Evangelists of UBA

1. Ord. Evan. Imangrai Jamatia
2. Ord. Evan. Abraham Jamatia
3. Ord. Evan. Uttam Kr. Jamatia
4. Ord. Evan. Phaijak Jamatia

Evangelists of UBA

1. Evan. Jiban Barma Jamatia
2. Evan. Swlaijak Jamatia
3. Evan. Nabin Chandra Jamatia
4. Evan. Swapan Jamatia
5. Evan. Bijoy Kumar Jamatia
6. Evan. Bipad Sadhan Jamatia
7. Evan. Baibel Kalai

=== Saisawm Sazai Baptist Association (SSBA) ===
SSBA Retired PASTORS

- Pastor Akhawi Dourai
- Rev. Zokhuma Rokhum (L)
- Rev. Mishilkumar Molsom (L)
- Rev. Sonabahadur Molsom
- O/E Dananjoy Molsom
- O/E HK Zionthanga

SSBA pastors

1. Rev.Sidhantorai Molsom (ES)
2. Rev.Dumbumoni Hrangkhawl
3. Rev.Dulirai Molsom
4. Rev Neilutlian Kaipeng
5. Rev Lalpanliana Molsom
6. Rev Mosia Molsom
7. Rev. Chondrolal Molsom
8. Rev.Vanlalnghaka Kuki
9. Rev.Temlongir Hrangkhawl
10. Rev.Joykumar Kaipeng
11. Rev.Porimal Kaipeng(AGS TBCU)
12. O/E.Purnibasi Molsom
13. O/E.Ramedas Molsom

PRO. PASTOR

1. PP.Madhyakumar Molsom
2. PP.Joyson Hrangkhawl
3. PP.David Lalthangliana Kaipeng

SSBA workers

1. Mr.Isaka Bongcher
2. Mr.Samuel Molsom
3. Mr.Ojit Molsom
4. Mr.Samuel Kaipeng
5. Mrs.Usharani Hrangkhawl
6. Mr.James Molsom
7. Mr.Lalthafela Betu
8. Mr.Rajibmohan Molsom
9. Mr.Gobindakumar Molsom

- There are 73 Churches, 11 fellowship and 2 Preaching Centre 13349 communicant Members. 196 Deacon and 25 life Deacon in SSBA (as in 2024)

== List of churches affiliated to TBCU ==
=== Sadar North Baptist Association (SNBA) ===
==== Abhicharan Baptist Pastoral Circle ====
- Kisong (1973)
- Dofidar (1977)
- Rajghat (1977)
- Durga Choudhury Kami (1982)
- Abhicharan (1983)*
- Wala Kami (1983)
- Lefunga (1987)
- Sadhiram (1988)
- Kainta Kwpra (1990)
- Habildar (1990)
- Twisa Kwthang (1992)
- Mokam (1993)
- Bokjur (2002)
- Twisa Kwchang (2006)
- Rojong (2006)
- Kumaribil (2006)
- Phota Kami (2007)
- Raikanai (2008)
- Raj Chantai (2010)
- Kanto Kwpra (2010)
- Maikhor (2012)

==== Borkathal Baptist Pastoral Circle ====
- Debra (1978)
- Boiragi (1980)
- Borkathal (1986)
- Doigola (1987)
- Belphang (1987)
- Bargachia (1988)
- Khwichang (1988)
- Patni (1989)
- Yacharai (1991)
- Tokmakari (1994)
- Hathai Kwchang (2005)
- Chakhuma (2006)
- Khampar (2007)
- Bag Kami (2008)
- Radhanagar (2008)
- Salka (2010)
- Dugurai
- Urua Kami (2012)
- Twibru
- Harep Kotor (2021)

==== Champaknagar Baptist Pastoral Circle ====
- Khamting (1971)
- Bhrigudas (1977)
- Joynagar (1988)
- Jangalia (1988)
- Goyacharan (1989)
- Kulang Thagu (2013)
- Sobhamani (1990)
- Sinai Kami (1991)
- Maharam Sardar (1993)
- Hamari (1993)
- Rasu (1994)
- Rangking
- Sarat Sardar (1995)
- Roktia (1997)
- Debra (1999)
- Lalit Mohan (1999)
- Chokhreng (2003)
- Borduar
- Waraitwisa (2004)
- Duranta (2005)
- Uakjara (2005)
- Chandra Sadhu (2006)
- Immanuel (2007)
- Mang Kanto (2008)
- Rabicharan Thakur (2010)
- Nareng (2010)
- Thastwi Hatai (2011)
- Sambhusadhu (2012)

==== Dakdu Baptist Pastoral Circle ====
- Binon Kwpra (1975)
- Bhuban Chantai (1979)
- Madhab (1980)
- Sonamoni Sipai (1983)
- New Testament (1984)
- Boidya Kwpra (1986)
- Ramchandra (1990)
- Sibram (1998)
- Sridam Kwpra (1999)
- Chamathwi (2007)
- Sikwrai Kwpra (2007)
- Badramisip (2008)
- Thang Kami (2008)
- Lamkwthar (2010)
- Burakha (2010)
- Aitorma
- Kha Kwtal (2014)
- Boirwng

==== Hezamara Baptist Pastoral Circle ====
- Hezamara (1994)
- Garing Kami (1994)
- Shankhola (1995)
- Doldoli (1998)
- Chandranath (2003)
- Hasing Auar (2005)
- Matia (2006)
- Sonaram Industry (2008)
- Twisa Kuphur (2009)
- Bargatha (2010)
- Ganthalwng
- Dagia

==== Jamilwng Baptist Pastoral Circle ====
- Bagbari (1978)
- Bhati Fatik Cherra (1987)
- Agartala City (1988)
- Singlwng (1990)
- Gangalwng (1993)
- Jamilwng (1995)
- Kami Kwtal (1997)
- Hamari (2003)
- Kha Kotor (2004)
- Sipai (2006)
- Khampar kami (2008)
- Pohor (2009)
- Gamsa Kwpra (2010)
- Naran Kami
- Thansa (2023)

==== Mandwi Baptist Pastoral Circle ====
- Thaiplok Phang (1977)
- Manikung (1978)
- Matham (1983)
- Mandwi (1986)
- Udai Kwpra (1987)
- Bishram (1989)
- Khengrai (1989)
- Sat Para (1996)
- Nepal Mura (1996)
- Naba Chandra (1997)
- Begram (1999)
- Lakhan Kwpra (2000)
- Bethel (2000)
- Baludum (2005)
- Hachwk Madhab (2007)
- Kanta Kobra (2009)
- Nolbogola (2009)
- Dondra (2015)
- Kherengbar (2010)
- Chhoigoria (2010)
- Chairgoria (2013)
- Emau (2013)
- Bokhiri (2013)

=== Central Baptist Association (CBA) ===
==== Bishramganj Baptist Pastoral Circle ====
- Borkur (1960)
- Morgang (1970)
- Ramnagar (1974)
- Amtali (1979)
- Herma (1989)
- Rangmala (1991)
- Golirai (1991)
- Sutarmura (1992)
- Bishramganj (1994)
- Twichang (1995)
- Latia Chharra (1996)
- Pagli (2000)
- Monai Khar (2000)
- Hirapur (2000)
- Twibokhorok (2001)
- Sreehari (2001)
- Tokturma (2001)
- Jagukhar (2002)
- Nukhung Rasa (2002)
- Hathai Kwchak (2003)
- Santaram (2006)
- Chikan Chhara (2007)
- Maharam

- Rangchak

==== City Baptist Pastoral Circle ====
- City (2001)
- Modhupur (2006)

==== Gabardi Baptist Pastoral Circle ====
- Dundrai (1989)
- Shyamnagar (1990)
- Jong (1992)
- Berja (1993)
- Bethel (1995)
- Bharat Sardar (2006)
- Ramgati (2006)
- Sambhu Charan (2006)
- Bahumani (2006)
- Salom (1996)
- Kanchanmala (1997)
- Khabaksa (2000)
- Pohor (2000)
- Gabardi (2001)
- Konai (2005)
- Dhukhia Kwpra (2006)
- Hari Mangal (2006)
- Satukura (2007)
- Harihari (2008)
- Ramanadh (2008)
- Khama Berjo (2008)
- Kha Swrang (2008)
- Dhupchara (2010)
- Hari Jamadar (2005)
- Bhabania

==== Jampui Baptist Pastoral Circle ====
- Morgang East (1979)
- Nabasardar (1987)
- Gahiram (1988)
- Gurudayal (1988)
- Boiragi (1989)
- Thelakung (1990)
- Bahatur (1993)
- Jampuijala Block (1997)
- Jelua (2002)
- Jampui Hati (2003)
- Getsimani (2005)
- Muitu (2006)
- Twisarangchak (2006)
- Sombar Hati (2006)
- Suarikhola (2006)
- Muni Chandra (2007)
- Ram Sardar (2007)
- Saka Nimai (2008)
- Twithaiplok (2008)
- Sankatram (2008)
- 3 No Colony (2009)
- Suari Khola

==== Takarjala Baptist Pastoral Circle ====
- Kamichang (1986)
- Takarjala (1986)
- Ganjamara (1987)
- Pekuarjala (1990)
- Bokhri (1994)
- Kandram (1998)
- Sampaijak (1998)
- Phantok (1999)
- Twijlang (1999)
- Jangalia (2002)
- Paliabanga (2005)
- Thastwi (2005)
- Gangahari (2005)
- Kherthakur (2007)
- Debendra (2008)
- Hiramanta (2009)
- Nazareth (2009)
- Khakwtal (2009)
- Arjun Thakur (2008)
- Bethlehem (2010)
- Bethany

=== Udaipur Baptist Association (UBA) ===
==== Amarpur Baptist Pastoral Circle ====
- Dulukma (1980)
- Gorjung(1980)
- Nograi (1988)
- Bangphur (1988)
- Khakchang (1989)
- Koroimura (1990)
- Kasko (1990)
- Shalom (1990)
- Paithak (1992)
- Dugri (1992)
- Sonkhala (1992)
- Tingoria (1995)
- Golgatha (1999)
- Horeb (1997)
- Twijlang (2000)
- Adongkha (2001)
- Kashi Podo (2009)
- Rambadra (2010)
- Mayunguarai (2000)
- Sada Radha (2007)
- Songang (2007)
- Twibaglai (2009)
- Ompi Regrouping Colony (2009)
- Sesua Colony (2010)
- Jarikosom
- Gongia
- Noloni
- Hodrai
- Garjung Phang
- Chwla kaham
- Dalak
- Salka
- Khajur
- Raima(2018)

==== Marandi Baptist Pastoral Circle ====
- Bethel (1974)
- Songnari (1987)
- Immanuel (1988)
- Gilgal (1990)
- Hwlwighati (1992)
- Twiwandal (1993)
- Uamlwi (1994)
- Sungrung (1999)
- Gulmura (1999)
- Tiar (2000)
- Ruthai (2004)
- Twi Horchung (2005)
- Yapri Kwtal (2005)
- Ha Rangchak (2006)
- Mayung Twisa (2008)
- Tholi Bari (2008)
- Twichangma (2008)
- Twisoma (2008)
- Salka Twisikambuk (2009)
- Laiso (2009)
- Monai Panthor (2010)
- Baso (2015)
- Chundul (2016)
- Kami kwtal(2018)
- Lailwng (2019)

==== Pitra Baptist Pastoral Circle ====
- Kuar (1972)
- Manikya (1973)
- Singi Lwng (1974)
- Joying (1972)
- Hare (1979)
- Kunjomura (1979)
- Raio (1980)
- Kami Kwtal (1982)
- Hamari (1988)
- Torbang (1989)
- Saimarua (1992)
- Salem (1992)
- St. John's (1993)
- Khakchang (1996)
- Kuar Khampar (1997)
- Langma (1997)
- Khumulwng (1997)
- Maikrwisa (1997)
- Thaipong Hathai (2002)
- Kha Kuphur (2007)
- South Yalwkma (2008)
- Yalwkma(1972)
- Borchuk Hathai (2019)

=== Kok Baptist Association (KOKBA) ===
- Chandranath (1974)
- Pointram (1979)
- Moglam (1980)
- Gwngrai (1981)
- Jiten (1982)
- Madharam (1984)
- Anath Chowdhury (1985)
- Belchara (1988)
- Ghilatoli (1989)
- Basanta Kobra (1990)
- Khakchangma (1990)
- Maharani (1991)
- Thagur (1991)
- Chhanlwng (1992)
- Dophidar (1993)
- Gairing (1994)
- Sumanta (1994)
- Tagla (1994)
- Bathaka (1994)
- Chargoria (1994)
- Khowai Town (1994)
- Mosok Kami (1995)
- Bokomnia (1996)
- Yakhrai (1998)
- Bishnu Ram Sipai (1999)
- Mudilenga (1999)
- Lampra (2001)
- Monaikhor (2002)
- Kami Kwchar (2002)
- Uahlwng (2002)
- Bolitali (2003)
- Tulasikhor (2003)
- Behalabari (2003)
- Capital (2003)
- Haruaktali (2004)
- Twisa rangchak (2005)
- Baikuntho (2006)
- Balua (2006)
- Goyamphang (2006)
- Nisan (2007)
- Manik Chowdhury (2007)
- Athuk Twisa (2007)
- Mwtai Kami (2007)
- Naithok (2007)
- Tingaria (2007)
- Marchaduk (2007)
- Khaswrang (2008)
- Akhara (2009)
- Ampura (2009)
- Thailik Bwlwng (2009)
- Jalai Twisa (2009)
- Petra Kami (2009)
- Mayung kwthwi (2009)
- Tokchaya (1988)
- Sipai Hour (1992)
- Padmabil (2006)
- Harepkuar (2004)
- Mungia (1996)
- Bidhyabil (1990)

=== Salgra Baptist Association (SBA) ===
==== Dhanu Chowdhury Baptist Pastoral Circle ====
- Dhanu Chowdhury (1977)
- Maichaya Para (1980)
- Khumtwisa (1985)
- Madab Nagar (1988)
- Emmanuel (1991)
- Matham Kami (2004)
- Hapta Para (2007)
- Betagi (2008)
- Kosomtwisa (2008)

==== Thailik Twisa Baptist Pastoral Circle ====
- Bethel (1978)
- Banapha Para (1979)
- Taimang (1981)
- Thailik Twisa (1991)
- Rangchak (1996)
- Maira Twisa (2000)
- Twisa (2007)

==== Bankul Baptist Pastoral Circle ====
- Zarzari (1980)
- Bankul (1984)
- Pokul (2001)
- Thaipong Twisa (2002)
- Padhamani (2007)
- Garipha (2009)
- Rosoma (2010)
- Saira (2010)
- Sabroom Town (2010)

==== Khakchang Baptist Pastoral Circle ====
- Twiruma (1992)
- Bananta (1994)
- Khakchang (1995)
- Domdoma (1996)
- Thansa (2001)
- Monyapara (2004)
- Eden (2009)
- Akabang (2010)

==== Desharam Baptist Pastoral Circle ====
- Twimuk (1997)
- Desharam (2003)
- New Gunjalima (2008)
- Bakmara (2008)
- Tongthokma (2010)
- Sinai (2010)

=== Saisawm Sazai Baptist Association ===
==== Gongrai Pastor Circle ====
- Gongrai (1968)
- Bijoynandi
- Bethlehem
- Olive
- Dhuptoli
- Tulamura
- Dailonga
- Bethesda
- Thandachhora
- Monithang(F)
- Kachigang
- Zirkanto
- Darkathang
- Twibaklai
- Ngava tuidai (F)
- Lungchhir
- Blue Hill

==== Dewanchhora Pastor Circle ====
- Raio
- Dewanchhora
- Rehobot Zawlkhaw
- Sonkhola
- Dak
- Darjiling
- Tutu
- Twibaklai
- Lailak No-1
- Lailak No 2 (F)
- Bangphai

=== Donlekha Pastor Circle ===
- Donlekha
- Montang
- Barmachhora
- IBC
- Robokva
- Lungphun
- Zion
- Sontang
- Sonkhola
- Nupangrumva
- Horeb
- Moria
- Salem

==== Gamagur Pastor Circle ====
- Gamagur
- Eloi
- S.Colony
- Nelsi
- Marva
- Bethlehem
- Gramha( F)
- Kanan
- Marva Colony
- Thumnograi
- Tuicholong
- Shilom

==== Kamlachora Pastor Circle ====
- Kamlachora-II
- Raipasa
- Monafa
- Donchora Bethel
- Yawejere
- Maskumbir
- Kamalachora-I
- Shik Khaw(F)
- Kanchanpur
- Kulaigontachora
- NG Para
- Empruchhora
- Mekazin
- Zawlkhaw
- Jabakhaw(F)
- Chankumar (F)
- Horinchhora(F)
- Pisga (F)

=== Twichakma Pastor Circle (2024) ===
- Twichakma
- Thelakung
- Zawltungi
- Darkhai
- sonarai
- Tangpui
- Choygaria
- Bola (F)
- Dupatila

=== Hawaibari Pastor Circle (2024) ===
- Hawaibari (1924)
- Tuikoi
- Rangamura
- Karmel
- Bethel
- Kanan (F)

=== Kamalpur Baptist Association (KBA) ===
- Maharani BC (1965)
- Bamanchara BC (1966)
- Chuttosurma BC (1989)
- L.T.S BC (1992)
- Chankap BC (1992)
- Mechuria BC (1993)
- Uatlok Twisa BC (1993)
- Sinai BC (1994)
- Kaimai BC (1994)
- Panbua BC (2001)
- Asha Purna BC (2001)
- Salem BC (2002)
- Dhanchandra BC (2005)
- Mwthangnai BF (2005)
- Twirubam BC (2005)
- Pohor BC (2005)
- Marachara BC (2006)
- Mendi BF (2006)
- Sion BC (2008)
- Kamalpur Town BF (2008)
- Bagaishwari BC (2010)
- Salkabai BF(2024)
- Lobthar BC (2024)
- Bugra BC
- Twichak BC
- Muitulwng BF
- Kamaranga BC
- Katalutma BC
- Kaisingtwisa BF
- Smyrna BF
- Tokthu Twisa BF

=== Hachwk Haphar Baptist Association (HHBA) ===
- Joyganti (1971)
- Lalcharra (1978)
- Satarai (1988)
- Chailengta (1988)
- Khumbar Kami (1989)
- Rajkandi (1989)
- Araidrun (1989)
- Jarulcharra (1993)
- Golgotha (1993)
- Saidachhera (1996)
- Bkhaktal (1997)
- Fatikchhera (1997)
- Hamari (1999)
- Dhanbilash (1999)
- Khasrang (2000)
- Bethlehem (2005)
- Samruchhera (2007)
- Chhagaldema (2007)
- Ashinray (2007)
- Behakumar (2008)
- Kamal Charan (2008)
- Nilkumar (2008)
- Naitung Chhara (2008)
- Baganbari (2009)
- Pancham Nagar (2009)

=== Songang Baptist Christian Association (SBCA) ===
- Diliram (1962)
- Palka (1980)
- Baishyamani (1980)
- Bormura (1983)
- Smai Kwtal (1987)
- Twidu (1987)
- Sinai Kami (1990)
- Twichakma (1991)
- Bethel (1996)
- Jordan (2004)
- Hallua (2009)
- Brahmachara (2009)

== Controversies ==
The state government of Tripura accused the organization of lending support to separatist NLFT rebels.

The Government of Tripura uncovered evidence asserting that the Baptist Church in Tripura had been helping Tripuri militants, such as the NLFT in the state. The NLFT militants, who are involved in armed struggle for the independence of Tripura, and the creation of a "Christian state", have been forcing local tribals to convert to Christianity at gunpoint and threatening to murder participants in Hindu festivals. It is believed that as many as 5,000 tribal villagers were converted in this fashion over two years. These forcible conversions to Christianity, sometimes including the use of "rape as a means of intimidation," have also been noted by academics outside of India.

The government accused the Baptist Church of Tripura for supporting this violent campaign of NLFT by providing funding and arms for the group. In April 2000, Nagmanlal Halam, Secretary of the Noapara Baptist Church in Tripura, was caught with a large quantity of explosives which were meant for the group. Halam later confessed to buying and supplying explosives to the NLFT for the past two years. Another church official, Jatna Koloi, was arrested in south Tripura in April 2000. According to the State Police, Mr Koloi had received training in guerrilla warfare at an NLFT base in 1999.

== See also ==
- Tripuri people
- Sadar North Baptist Association
- Christianity in Tripura
- Council of Baptist Churches in Northeast India
- List of Christian denominations in North East India
- Tripura Presbyterian Church Synod
