= Hezamara =

- Village
- Location of Hezamara Hezamara (India)
- Coordinates: 23.996°N 91.430°E
- Country: India
- State: Tripura
- District: West Tripura

Languages
  - Official: Kokborok, Bengali, English
- Time zone: UTC+5:30 (IST)
- Vehicle registration: TR
- Website: tripura.gov.in

Hezamara is a village in the Mohanpur subdivision of the West Tripura district in Tripura, India. The village is located between Sidhai-Mohanpur and Simna on the main road. Hezamara also serves as a link to the town of Khowai in Khowai subdivision.

The people are mainly Tripuris. The main economic activities are agriculture and small businesses, most related to the nearby rubber and tea plantations.

The headquarters of the Hezamara Rural Development Block are located here; the present Block Development Officer (BDO) is Gourbindu Das.

== See also ==
- Khumulwng, the headquarters of TTAADC.

== Offices ==
- Hezamara ICDS Project
- Hezamara
- Hezamara
- Barakathal
