= Hathai Kotor (Baramura) =

Hill range in India

- Hachuk

Highest point
- Parent peak: Hachuk Berem (Atharamura)
- Coordinates: 23°48′30″N 91°33′30″E

Geography
- Location: West Tripura, Khowai, Gomati
- Country: India
- State: Tripura

Hathai Kotor, formerly known as Baramura, is a hill range centrally located in the state of Tripura in India.

Hathai Kotor is also known for its great hornbill birds and holds Hornbill Festivals.

The 8 National Highway (Assam-Agartala road) crosses through the Baramura hill range.

Baramura has a gas thermal and power plant.

== Etymology ==
Hathai Kotor which is in Kokborok language translates to Big Mountains. This name was given by the Tiprasa people who lived in the hill range and also in the foothills that encompassed the present three Districts of West Tripura, Khowai, and Gomati.

== Geography ==
Multiple rivers originate from this hill range, namely the Saidra and Sumli river that flow to Bangladesh.

== Ecology ==
The Hathai Kotor Reserve Forest, situated within the administrative jurisdiction of Khowai district, is among the largest forest tracts in the state of Tripura.

== Park ==
Hathai Kotor Eco-Park is an eco park 40 kilometres from Agartala, the capital of Tripura.
