= Khumulwng =

- Town
- Nickname: City of flowers
- Location within Tripura Location within India
- Coordinates: 23.79°N 91.44°E
- Country: India
- State: Tripura
- District: West Tripura

Languages
  - Official: Kokborok, English,
- Time zone: UTC+5:30 (IST)
- PIN: 799 045
- Telephone code: 91-0381
- Vehicle registration: TR
- Website: tripura.gov.in

Khumulwng is a town in the West Tripura district in the Indian state of Tripura. It is the headquarters and the largest town of the Tripura Tribal Areas Autonomous District Council.

== History ==
Khumulwng was established in 1991. The TTAADC headquarters was shifted to the town from 1996 onwards.

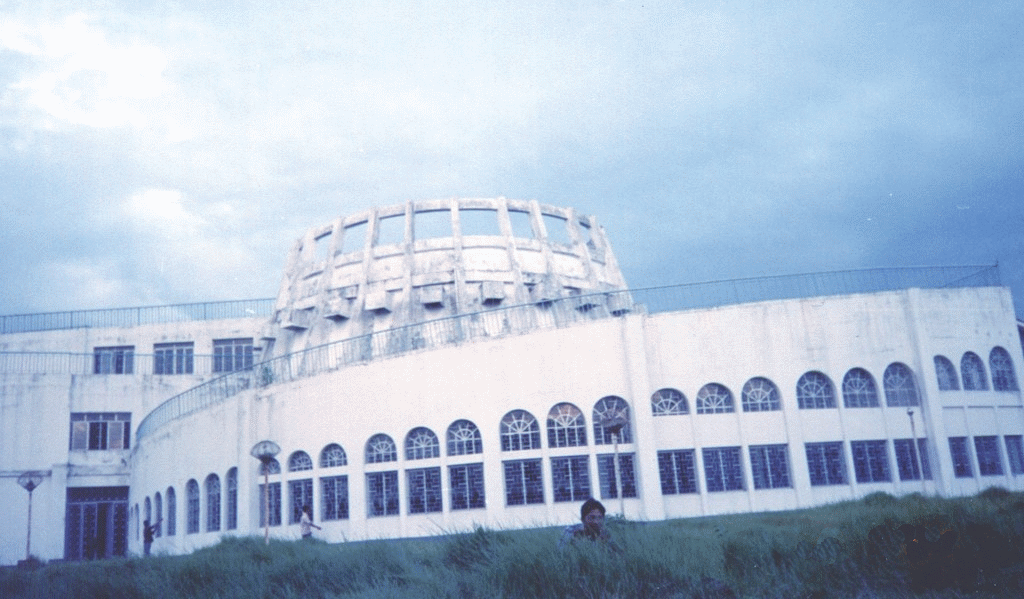
Kaunsil Nok, Khumulwng

== Geography ==
It is situated 18 km from Agartala.

=== Kokchap Nok ===
The most beautiful landmark of the town is the Kaunsil Nok (Council House) located right in the heart of the town. This structure houses the legislative body of the TTAADC (Tripura Tribal Areas Autonomous District Council).

== Demographics ==
The ethnic population of the town are the Tripuri people formed about 100% in the area, rest are others. The predominant language is Kokborok. The other most used language is English which is also used as a lingua franca.

== Culture ==
Various socio-cultural clubs are coming up to promote local culture, flora and fauna. The cultural and natural environment of Khumulwng are notable. The town is a blend of Tipra culture and the Christian influence. We see people celebrating the Goria Ter as well as the Christmas with much joyfulness. Most of the people, by profession, here are either government employees and their families or engaged in business.

=== Churches ===
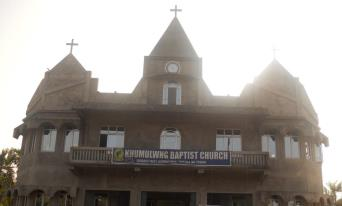
Khumulwng Baptist Church

There are many Churches in and around the town area, most notably

St.Thomas Believers Eastern Church:- Believers Eastern Church Tripura was established by Rev.Anil Kumar Debbarma, who is now known as Bishop Anil Mor Philemon, the first Ordained Bishop of BEC among the tripuri community, in the month of February 1996 (his wife Suchitra Debbarma was also present throughout the journey of BEC Tripura). It started as Gospel for Asia (GFA) Bible training center with only 30 students. Gospel for Asia Bible training center (now known BEC minor seminary) is the first Bible college in Tripura. At present, the BEC church campus in Khumulwng stays as the headquarter for the four mission dioceses under Believers Eastern Church Tripura. This church and the seminary was established while Khumulwng was still a forest area with very less people living there. Being the first Bible college of Tripura, it was not easy for the pioneers to not face any troublesome days.

- Khumulwng Baptist Church:- This church was established on 22 March 1998. Rev.Chuanshekhor Debbarma, Dn. Bhupendra Debbarma, Dn. Hemchandra Debbarma and many Christians of Khumulwng area had faced many barriers to established the Church at Khumulwng. At that time the church had a thatch roofed prayer house. It has now a beautiful Church building which was designed by Er. Dhaniram Debbarma and Er. Ranjit Debbarma and built during his 10 years tenure(2001–2010) as Secretary of the Church. This church has 471 members(AS per census 2010).
- Zion Baptist Church
- Joygobin Baptist Church
- Khakchangma Baptist Church
- Dashram Baptist Church
- Galili Baptist Church
- Immanuel Baptist Church
- Rangchak Baptist Church
- Mwichwnghar Baptist Church
- Presbyterian Church

On every December a fair is organized by the group of local churches where people of all walks of life and from all faith participate to show their brotherhood.

== Tourism ==
=== Khumulwng Museum and Heritage Centre ===
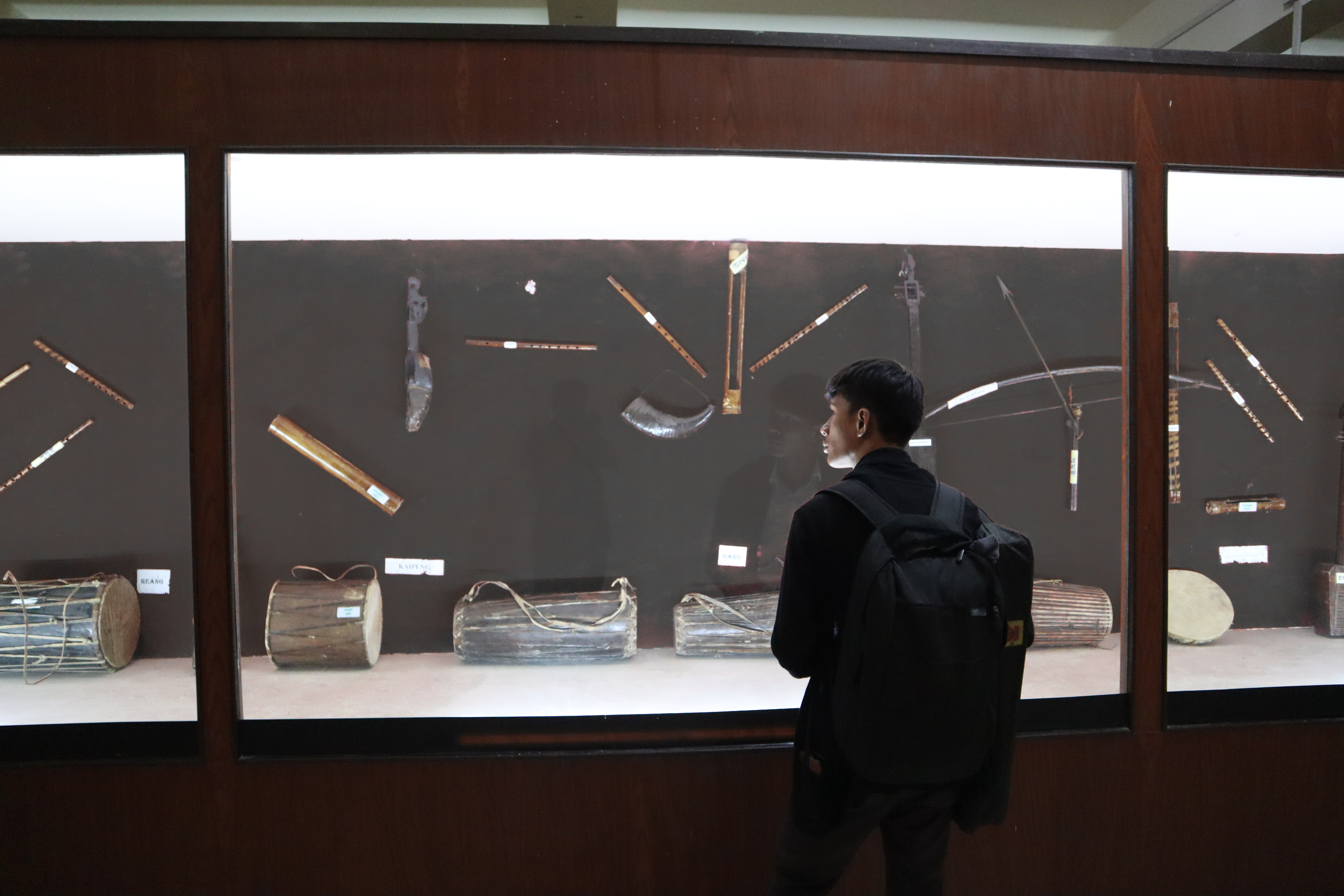
The Tiprasa Indigenous tools collection exhibition of Khumulwng Museum displays over 100 different types used in day to day life from farming to crafting.

Khumulwng Museum and Heritage Centre is a popular destination for tourist who visits the scenic town. It houses the indigenous Tiprasa culture and folk art. It also have collections of rare Tiprasa jewelleries, crafts, instruments and paintings.

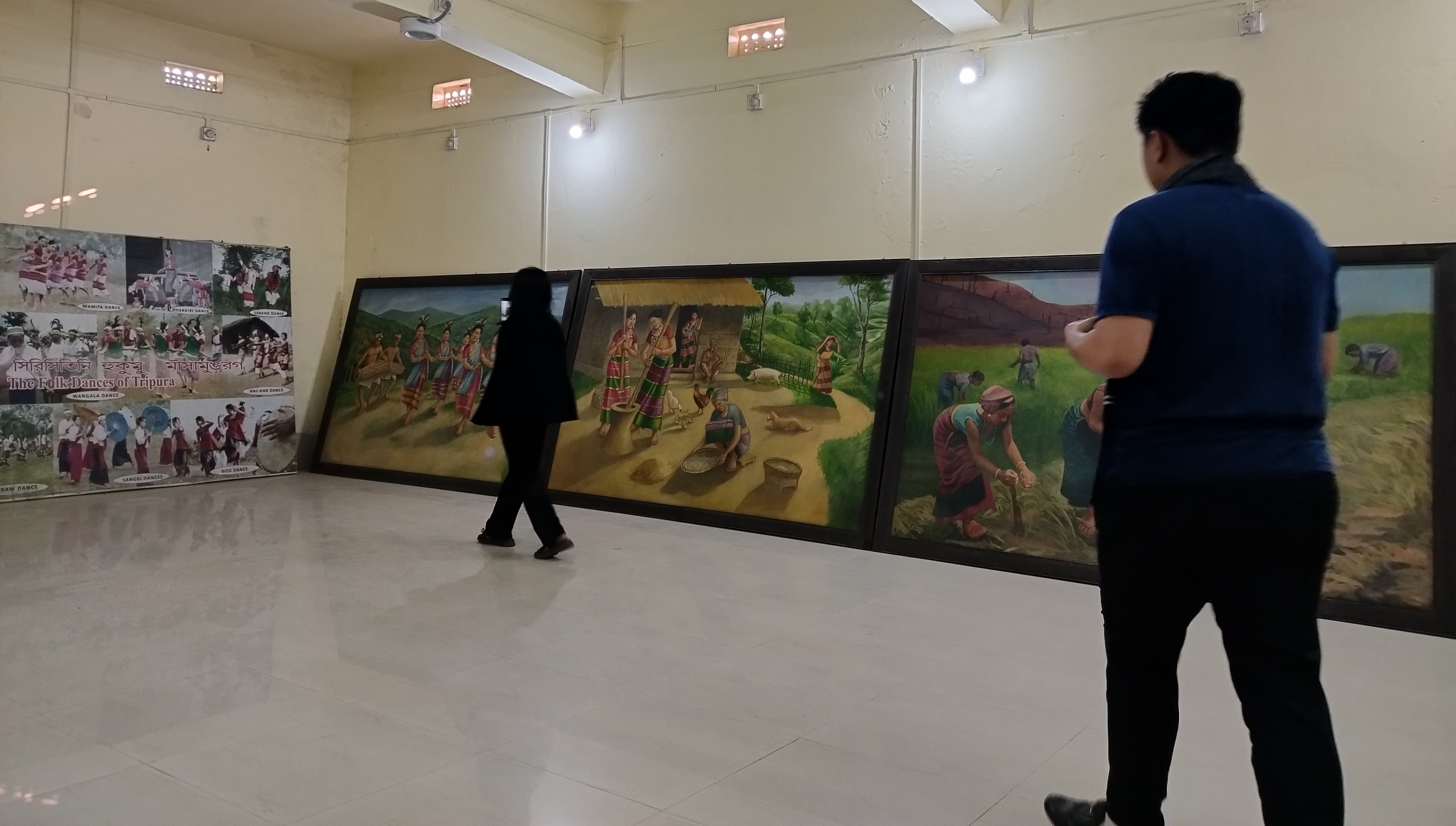
The Khumulwng Museum and Heritage Centre has a collection of paintings that portrays the culture of the Indigenous Tiprasa people of Tripura.

The museum exhibits the Indigenous Tiprasa cultures related to dresses, cloths, real life sized sculptures and inscriptions. Annually, it gets a visitors above thousand.

== Economy ==
Khumulwng act as the junction of transportation and business for the interior villages. It is fast emerging as the local business hub amongst the TTAADC.

=== Banks ===
The banks present in the town are:

- State Bank of India
- United Bank of India
- Tripura Gramin Bank

=== Markets ===
There are some markets in the town area catering to the growing needs of the town population. They are:

- Dukmali Hati, the main central market of the town
- Khumulwng Super Market
- Salka Hati Multicomplex

== Education ==
=== Schools ===
There are three important schools in Khumulwng. They are:

- Yakhili Academy, a privately run school by Sadar North Baptist Association.
- Khumpui Academy, school run by TTAADC.
- Khumpui Academy Annexe, an adjacent branch of the Khumpui Academy established in 2021.
- Eklayva Higher secondary School, a central government school.
- Sal Sampili (SASA) Academy, a private English Medium school.

=== Colleges ===
- Government General Degree College, Khumulwng
- Government Polytechnic Institute, Khumulwng
- Industrial Training Institute, Khumulwng
- NIELIT, Khumulwng
- Tripura Tribal Folk Music College
- TTAADC Polytechnic Institute, Khumulwng
- Borok Paramedical Institution & Technology, Khumulwng

== Government ==
Khumulwng is the capital and the headquarter of the Tripura Tribal Areas Autonomous District Council Government. Presently, the council is led by the Tipra Motha Party.

== Transport ==
Khumulwng can be accessed through road with the Assam-Agartala National Highway 44. The nearest stop on the highway is in Jirania (3 km) and the newly developing junction of Madhob Kami (2 km).

=== Khumulwng Motor Stand ===
It is located in the center of the town and is a place for motor vehicles running to neighbouring towns of Agartala, Jirania and Jampuijala.

=== Railway station ===
The nearest railway station is Jirania Railway Station, 3 km away from the town across the river Haora (Saidra).

=== Airport ===
The nearest airport is Agartala Airport located about 35 km away.

== Civic amenities ==
=== Town hall ===
Khumulwng has a Town-Hall situated near the Kaunsil Nok which is used by the people of the town for organizing various programs and functions.

=== Park ===
Across the Town-Hall is a park, used often as a picnic spot which is surrounded on three sides by a man-made lake.

=== Hospital ===
There is a government run hospital named as Kherengbar Hospital to serve the needs of the town and the surrounding population.

=== Stadium ===
There is a stadium in the town constructed by the Government which hosts many events and parades.

=== Kokborok Library ===
The Kokborok Language Library is situated in Khumulwng near the stadium and is run by the TTAADC administration.

== Recent events ==
=== Festival of Indigenous Tiprasa (FIT) ===
The Festival of Indigenous Tiprasa or FIT is a musical festival organised by Sports and Youth Affairs Department of the TTAADC Government in Khumulwng. It was first held in 2021 for three days long. Famous artists that performed in FIT are Borkung Hrangkhawl, Bollywood singer Papon and Lucky Ali.

KBCA Tripuri choir at the TBYF 2005, Khumulwng

=== TBYF ===
A huge gathering called Tripura Baptist Youth Fellowship was organized on 28–30 January 2005 in Khumulwng Baptist Church. The total delegation crossed 1500 strength. Delegates came from all over Tripura and even from Mizoram. Executives of TBCU, Zoram Baptist Mission and Evangelical Church of Maraland also took part in the fellowship. Different tribes of Tripura came and mingled with each other as if all were the same, like all in one, in Christ. The fellowship included Musical Meet, Discussions and Bible Classes.

== See also ==
- Kokborok
- Tripuri people
- Sadar North Baptist Association
