= Kanchanbari =

- Village
- Location in Tripura, India Kanchanbari (India)
- Coordinates: 24.1095564°N 91.9850943°E
- Country: India
- State: Tripura
- District: Unakoti

Government
  - Type: Gram Panchayat
  - Body: Kanchanbari Gram Panchayet
  - Gram Pradhan: (BJP)
- Elevation: 40 m (130 ft)

Population (2011)
  - Total: 6,696
- Demonym: Kanchanbaribashi

Languages
  - Official: Bengali
  - Additional official: English
- Time zone: UTC+5:30 (IST)
- Postal code: 799288 - 799286
- Telephone code: +03825
- Vehicle registration: TR
- Lok Sabha constituency: Tripura East
- Vidhan Sabha constituency: Fatik Roy no.51
- Precipitation: 2,081 mm (82 in)
- Avg. annual temperature: 24.5 °C (76 °F)
- Website: tripura.gov.in

Kanchanbari is a village in the Kumarghat subdistrict of the Unakoti district in the Indian state of Tripura. This village is located 28 kilometres (17 mi) south of the district headquarters in Kailasahar and 91 kilometres (57 mi) from the state capital Agartala. The village had a population of 6,696 as of 2011.

== History ==
Babu Chand Singha purchased the land on which Kanchanbari was built from Habibulla Choudhury (land number 33; area, 500 drun) and Akbar Ali (land number 34; area, 600 drun). Prior to this, the land was inhabited by Indigenous people, likely the Kuki. Singha then purchased taluk number 45 from Sarkar Bahadur. His son, Chandra Singh Choudhury, reportedly built a royal residence for Bir Bikram Kishore Debbarman, king of the Tripura Kingdom, and invited him to stay, after which he became close with the royal family. In 1927 (1337 Tring), the king visited Kailashahar, where he established the pargana Birchandra Nagar. Chandra Singh Choudhury became landlord of the pargana following the death of his father. Birchandra Nagar was later renamed Kanchanbari.

The name Kanchanbari was derived from Kanchanbrabhadebi, queen of Tripura and wife of Bir Bikram Kishore Debbarman. Revenue collected from Kanchanbari was deposited in the queen's treasury.

== Geography ==
Kanchanbari has a tropical savanna climate and sees rain from the southwest monsoons during the summer months. The four main seasons are winter (December to February), pre-monsoon season (March to May), monsoon season (June to September), and post-monsoon season (October to November). Temperatures range from 10 °C and 35 °C, with winter being its coldest season. The highest temperature is generally recorded in May and the lowest in January, and maximum rainfall is usually seen in June and July.

Holocene age quaternary sediments are visible in Kanchanbari. The lithology of local soil is alluvium. The Manu River flows south to north on the eastern side of the village, while the Laljuri Chherra flanks the western side. Kanchanbari is also home to Lake Kanchanmala Dighi.

== Demographics ==
The village is mostly dominated by Bengalis, including the Sylheti and Noakhalese, and the Manipuri people, including the Meitei. The local languages of Kanchanbari are Bengali and Manipuri.

== Education ==
The Kanchanbari School was founded in 1954 as a primary school and was renovated in the early 1960 to meet demands of the community. In 1981, it was upgraded to its current higher secondary level. The school was renamed the Dhana Singh Choudhury Memorial High School and serves parts of the Unakoti and Dhalai districts in addition to the village. The school is situated on a 4.91 acre plot of land and consists of two double-storey buildings.

== Transport ==
NH 8, running from Karimganj in Assam to Sabroom in Tripura, passes through the eastern side of the village and the Kumarghat-Fatikroy-Manu road passes through the heart of the village. The nearest railway station is the Kumarghat railway station, approximately 10 kilometres (6.2 mi) away.

== Culture ==
Annual festivals celebrated in Kanchanbari include Durga Puja, Kali Puja, Ramthakur Utsab, and Saraswati Puja. Thakur Anukul Chandra's birthday is celebrated each September at the Thaku Anukul Chandra Ashram, the largest temple in the village. Ras Purnima is celebrated at the mandap behind the school with the Meitei community.
