= Darchawi =

- village
- Location in Tripura, India Darchawi (India)
- Coordinates: 24.145°N 92.045°E
- Country: India
- State: Tripura
- Established: 23 January 1923

Population (2014)
  - Total: 1,433

Languages
  - Official: Darlong, Kokborok, English, Bengali
- Time zone: UTC+5:30 (IST)
- Postal code: 799264
- Vehicle registration: TR

Darchawi (Darlong for "Darchawi khua") is a village in Kumarghat Subdivision under Unakoti district of Tripura state in India. Mainly inhabited by the Darlong people of Tripura, it is also the headquarters of Kailashahar Baptist Christian Association.

It has a Bengali medium senior basic school and an English medium school, "Darchawi Christian High School" established in 1974.

== Emergence of the village ==
Prior to the establishment of Darchawi, the Darlong people resided in the western side of Deo river (Nelkang tuipui), Ramdingpa's village and Lalvana's village. The establishment of Darchawi village can be attributed to evangelist Zatuaha's prayer of establishing a Christian village for the Darlong people who were driven out of Saidara Khua by their Chief for embracing Christianity. Evangelist Zatuaha and six other Darlongs from Saidara Khua wandered to find a suitable place. They finally halted at this location on 23 January 1923, and named it 'Darchawi' (literally meaning 'raise the bells'). Over a period of 90 years, a sea change has taken place as people from different communities such as the Darlong, Tripuri, Garo, Lushai, Bengali, etc. irrespective of caste or creed settled here.

== Economic activities and pineapple cultivation in earlier times ==
Oranges were cultivated until the year 1937 AD. It was said that each tree bore fruits so abundantly that trees could not sustain without support. They were commercially grown for traders mainly from Kailashahar. The dependency of the villagers on jhum cultivation immediately stopped. The cultivation of pineapple started from 1937 AD. The production was around 2 million units per annum during the peak production years between 1955 AD and 1982 AD. There was huge wastage due to insufficient processing technologies during that period. Pineapple cultivation has contributed much to their well being and improved quality of life. In recent years, a majority of the population of the village has switched over to rubber plantations. Education has also brought a major transition in the day to day activities of the village people since a major population are engaged in government and public services for their livelihood and well-being.
