= 2021 Tripura riots =

Riot in India

2021 Tripura Riots
- Date: 20 – 29 October 2021
- Location: Tripura, India
- Caused by: Vandalisations of mosques

Parties
Vishva Hindu Parishad; Hindu Jagran Manch	Local authorities

Number
10,000+	

Casualties
- Injuries: 15
- Arrested: 102
- Buildings destroyed: 110+

The 2021 Tripura riots happened in the eponymous state of north-eastern India.

The riots started on 20 October 2021, mainly triggered by the vandalisations of "mosques" in the state. The situation deteriorated after several rallies were taken out by Vishwa Hindu Parishad (VHP) on 21 and 26 October. Some miscreants attacked a small mosque, some shops and houses belonging to families from the minority community during the rally. Section 144 was imposed soon after.

== Background ==
83.40% of Tripura's population is Hindu, with a significant number of Hindus migrating from Bangladesh. Locals see the recent violence in Tripura as a response to recent violence against Hindus in neighboring Bangladesh's Comilla District. The opposition parties like TMC and CPI(M) also alleged that BJP and its allies were trying to use the recent violence in Bangladesh and Tripura to polarise the voters ahead of the municipal elections in the state in November.

== Timeline ==
In protest against the violence in Bangladesh, rallies were held by Vishwa Hindu Parishad (VHP) and the Hindu Jagran Manch (HJM), among others. Participants in a rally held by VHP and HJM at Udaipur in Gomati district on October 21 clashed with police as the latter denied them permission to enter localities with mixed populations. Fifteen people including three policemen were injured in the incident. At Dharmanagar in north Tripura, a 10,000-strong rally was carried out on October 21 by different organisation's including VHP and the HJM.

After these incidents, rumours began circulating both offline and online. On October 23, images of a broken Shiva idol went viral on social media. Police later said that the Shiva idol was found in an abandoned place atop a local hilltop, surrounded by thick vegetation. They said there was no way to tell if it was broken due to natural causes or if someone broke it.

On October 26, a protest rally was taken out by VHP at Panisagar in north Tripura. A section of the protesters allegedly vandalised a few houses and burnt some shops at Rowa Bazar. On the same day, some activists who had joined the rally allegedly vandalised a local mosque at Chamtilla village, around 800 yards from Rowa Bazar.

Later in the night, a large gathering of people showed up from minority dominated localities in Churaibari. The administration then dispersed the gathering through discussions. Section 144 was imposed at Panisagar and Darmanagar.

On October 29 unidentified miscreants vandalised a local thatched-walled Kali Temple at Kailashahar of Unakoti district. Local Hindus and Muslims came together and rebuilt the thatched walls of the temple.

== Aftermath ==
Upon a complaint by AITC spokesperson Saket Gokhale, the National Human Rights Commission on November 3 sought a report on the riot from Chief Secretary of the state and Director General of Police.

=== Suppression of press freedom ===
A four-member fact-finding team of Supreme Court lawyers visited the area on 29–30 October and released a report highlighting the anti-Muslim nature of violence. Days later, Tripura Police invoked stringent anti-terror laws against two of them for “promoting enmity between religious groups as well as provoking people of different religious communities to commit breach of peace”. The police also filed charges under the same provisions against 102 people including journalists for protesting, or even merely mentioning, the communal violence on social media platforms and asked social media platforms to freeze their accounts. The 5 journalists include in the lists are Maktoob Media journalist Meer Faisal, NewsClick senior news editor Shyam Meera Singh, freelance journalist with BBC and The Guardian Sartaj Alam, Arif Shah and C.J. Werleman, global correspondent of London-based monthly newspaper Byline Times.

People's Union for Civil Liberties as well as Editors Guild of India condemned the coercive actions as malicious and requested the state government for committing to a proper investigation instead of penalizing activists. Several people filed a petition with the Supreme Court seeking to quash the UAPA charges registered against them. On 17 November, the Supreme Court of India granted immunity to all coercive action.

On 15 November, two female journalists were arrested from Assam for fomenting a "sense of hatred between communities" by circulating "doctored videos", after members of Vishva Hindu Parishad had filed a complaint against them (in Tripura) for reporting on an incident of mosque burning and thereby, "maligning the image of Tripura government". The Editors Guild of India asked for a swift withdrawal of all charges, and characterized the police actions as a foil to deflect public attention from its own failings in dealing with majoritarian violence. On 15 November, the Chief Judicial Magistrate of Gomati district granted them bail against sureties of INR 7500.
