= Ujan Dudhpur =

Coordinates: 24.097°N 91.980°E

Ujan Dudhpur is a gram panchayet in Kumarghat, Unakoti district, Tripura, India. The Manu River runs through this village.

There is a school in this panchayet named Dudhpur High School that educates almost 300 students.
