= Thanga Darlong =

Indian folk music artist (1920–2023)

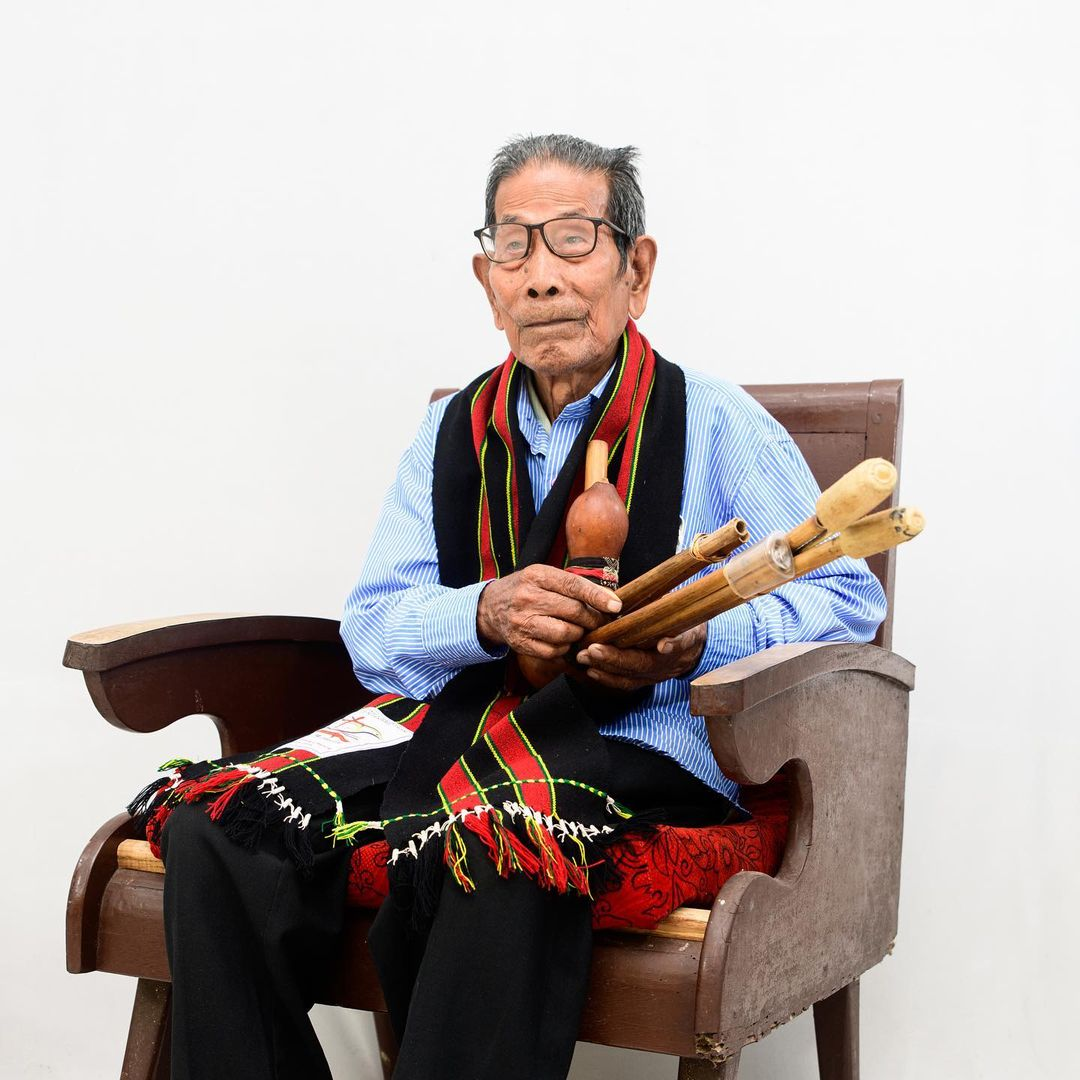
- Darlong holding the traditional musical instrument 'Rosem'

Background information
- Born: 20 July 1920; Muruai, Tripura, India
- Died: 3 December 2023 (aged 103) Kailashahar, Unakoti district, Tripura, India
- Genres: Folk Music of Tripura
- Occupation: Musician
- Instrument: Rosem

Thanga Darlong (20 July 1920 – 3 December 2023) was an Indian folk music artist, known for his contribution to the folk music of Tripura, and his work in preserving and promoting the traditional instrument Rosem.

== Biography ==
Thanga Darlong was born in Muruai village in Tripura. He was awarded the Padma Shri (2019), the fourth highest civilian award in India. He is also a recipient of Sangeet Natak Akademi Award (2014), the highest Indian recognition given to practising artists. He is also a recipient of Academic Fellowship Award (2015), state-level Vayoshresta Samman (2016) and Centenarian Award.

Darlong hailed from a Small Hilly ADC Village DeoraCherra Muraibari under Gournagar RD Block of Kailashahar in Unakoti district, Tripura. In 2016, he was also showcased in Tree of Tongues in Tripura directed by Josy Joseph.

Darlong was listed in the 2024 edition of Guinness World Records as the oldest professional male folk musician at 98 years and 319 days.

Darlong died on 3 December 2023, at the age of 103.

== Honours ==
- Padma Shri (2019)
- Vayoshresta Samman (2016)
- Academic Fellowship Award (2015),
- Sangeet Natak Akademi Award (2014)

== See also ==
- List of Padma Shri award recipients (2010–2019)
