= Unakoti district =

Coordinates: 24.2366°N 92.0199°E

- District of Tripura
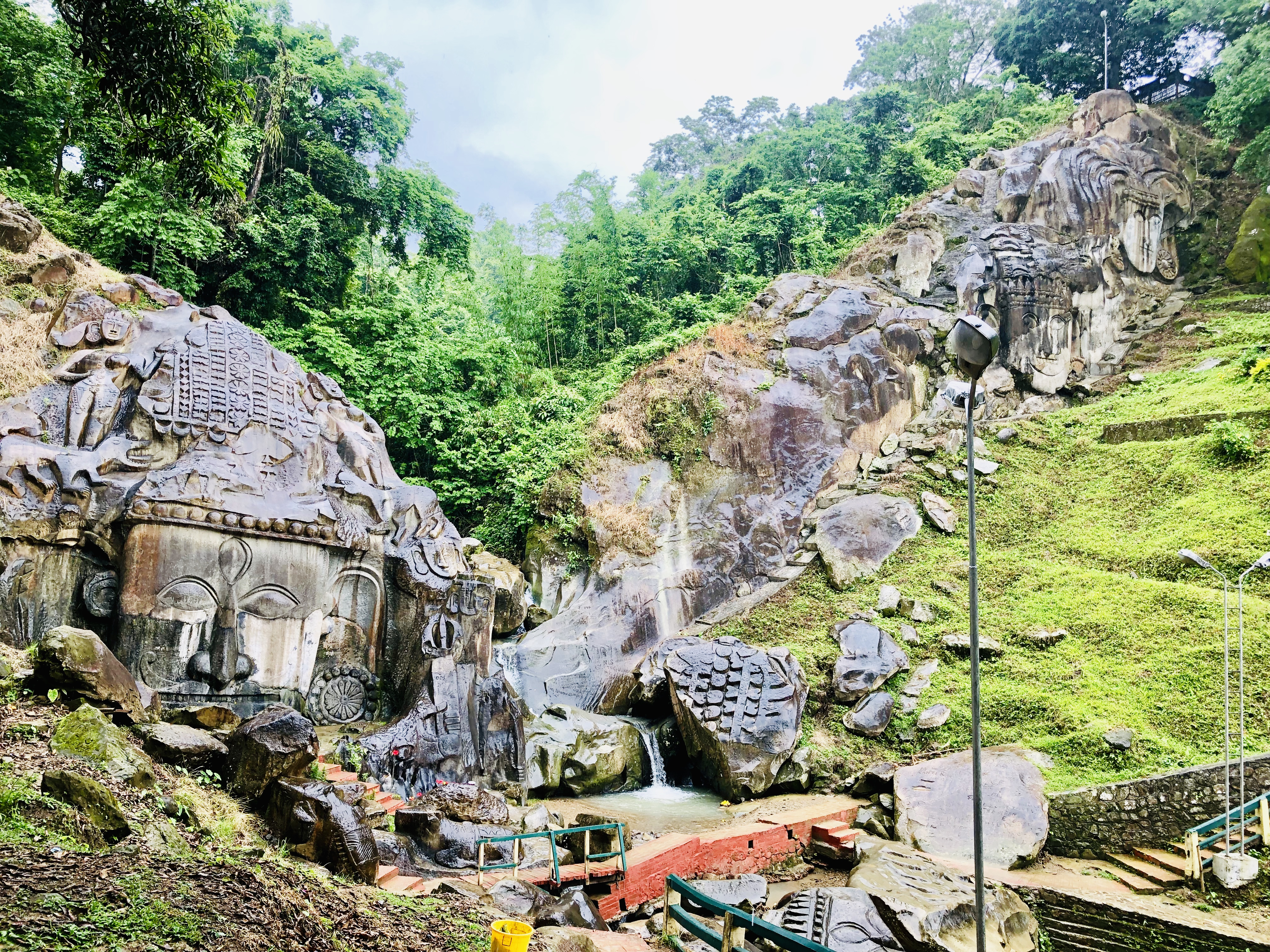
- Unakoti hill

- Location in Tripura
- Country: India
- State: Tripura
- Formation: 21 January 2012; 14 years ago
- Headquarters: Kailasahar

Government
  - Collector & District Magistrate: Tarit Kanti Chakma, IAS

Area
  - Total: 686.97 km^{2} (265.24 sq mi)
- Elevation: 915 m (3,002 ft)

Population (2011)
  - Total: 298,574
  - Density: 434.62/km^{2} (1,125.7/sq mi)
- Time zone: UTC+05:30 (IST)
- PIN: 7992XX
- STD: 3822
- ISO 3166 code: IN-TR
- Website: http://unakoti.nic.in/

Unakoti district is an administrative district in the state of Tripura in northeastern India. It is the least populated district of Tripura with the fourth highest literacy rate. The district has two sub divisions and four blocks. The district was created in 2012, by bifurcating the North Tripura district with its headquarter in Kailashahar.

== History ==
The former princely state of Tripura was ruled by Maharajas of Manikya dynasty. It was an independent administrative unit under the Maharaja even during the British rule in India, though this independence was qualified, being subject to the recognition of the British, as the paramount power of each successive ruler.

As per Rajmala, the royal chronology of Tripura, a total of 184 kings ruled over the state before it merged with the Indian Union on 15 October 1949. Since then the history of Tripura has been interspersed with various political, economical and social developments. On 26 January 1950 Tripura was accorded the status of a ‘C’ category state and on 1 November 1956, it was recognized as a Union Territory. It gained full statehood on 21 January 1972, as per the North-East Reorganisation Act, 1971.

Initially a one district state, was trifurcated into three Districts on 1 September 1970. The North Tripura District started functioning in the office of the Sub-divisional officer at Kailashahar and partly at Kumarghat, later the whole office was shifted to Kailashahar. The Collectorate was shifted to the newly constructed complex at Gournagar on 13 November 1987.

Subsequently, North Tripura District has been bifurcated and a new district, Dhalai district, has been inaugurated on 14 April 1995 with district head quarter at Ambassa.

On 21 January 2012 the decision to further bifurcate North Tripura district was accepted and the Unakoti district was created with its headquarter at Kailashahar.

== Etymology ==
Unakoti derives its name from the Unakoti hill. Unakoti literally means 'one less a koti' in Bengali. It hosts an ancient Shaivite place of worship with huge rock reliefs celebrating Shiva.

== Geography ==
The district is surrounded by Dharmanagar, Panisagar and Kanchanpur of North Tripura district, northeast, east and southeast respectively. South of Unakoti, there are the Kamalpur and Longthari valley of the Dhalai district. Its northern border is an international border with Bangladesh.

== Divisions ==
The District and divided into two sub-divisions, Kailashahar and Kumarghat. For developmental activities, it is divided into four blocks: Kumarghat, Pecharthal, Chandipur and Gournagar.

== Demographics ==
According to census 2011 Unakoti district has total population of 276,506. This includes 140,210 males and 136,296 females. The overall literacy rate is 86.91%. The male literacy rate is 90.92%, while the female literacy rate is 82.79%. There are 972 females per 1000 males.

== Climate ==
The Unakoti district has a monsoon climate. The plains regions have sub-tropical conditions while the hilly regions have more temperate climates.

There are four main seasons. The winter season lasts from December to February, while the pre-monsoon season follows on from March to May. The monsoon season then occurs from June to September, and the post-monsoon season occurs from October to November.

The temperature tends to range between 10°C and 35°C. The district's coldest season is winter. The highest temperature is typically in May and the lowest in January. The rainy season starts by about the end of May but thundershowers occur from April to the break of the monsoon. The rainy season ends in September. The maximum rainfall is usually recorded in June or July.

== Gallery ==
Unakoti Heritage Site

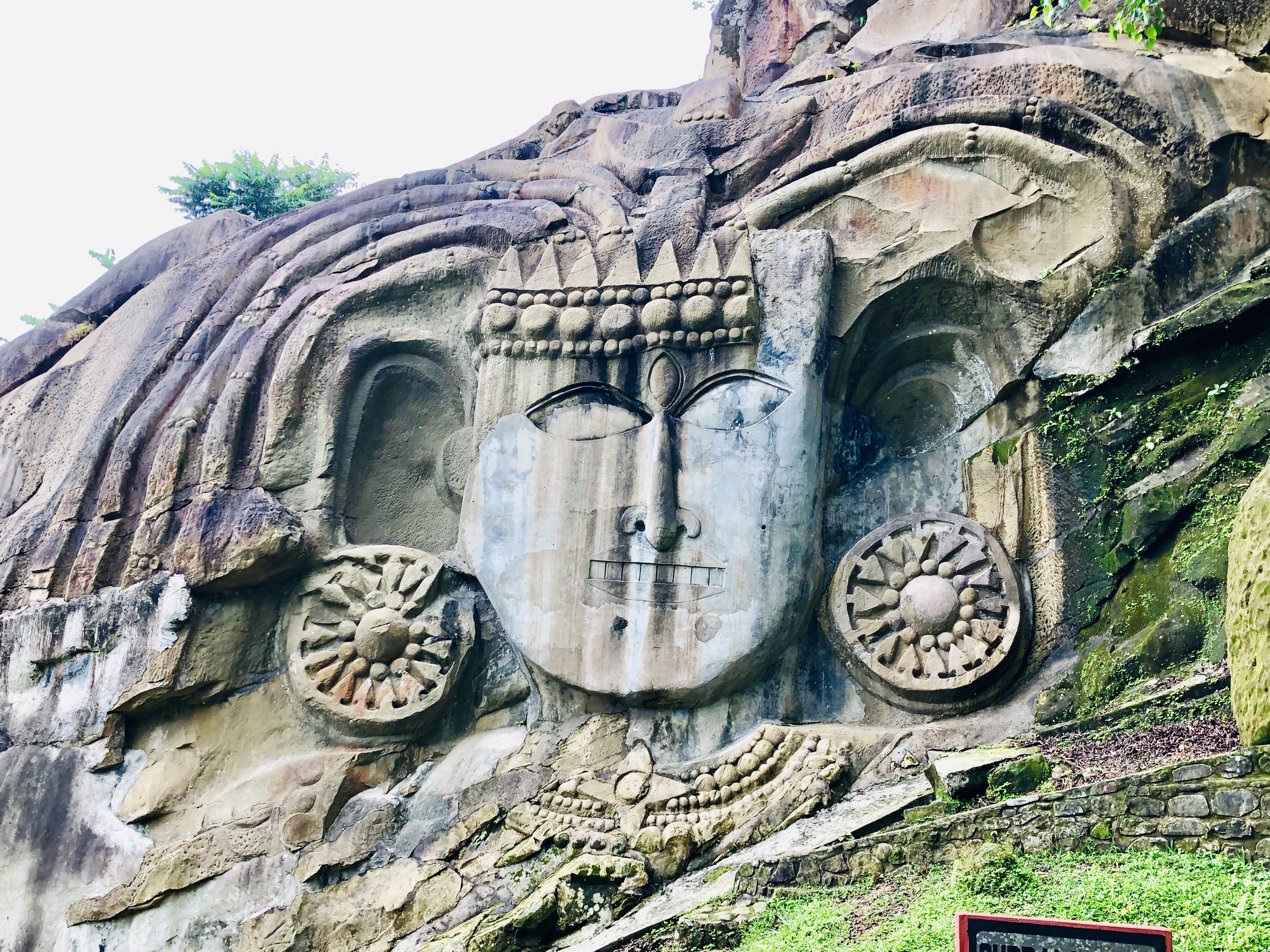
Shiva with the waters of Ganga flowing from his locks

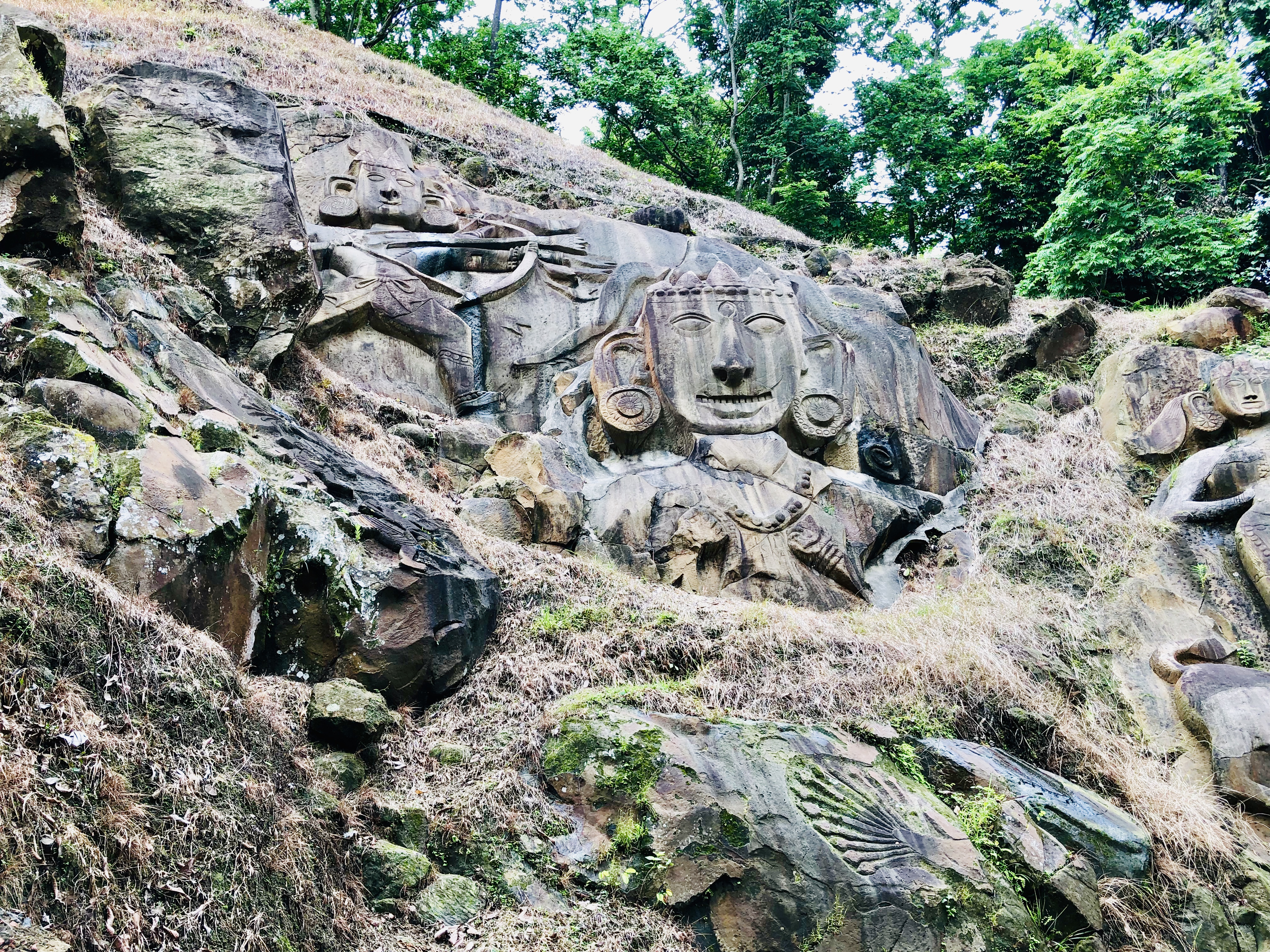
Mahishasurmardini

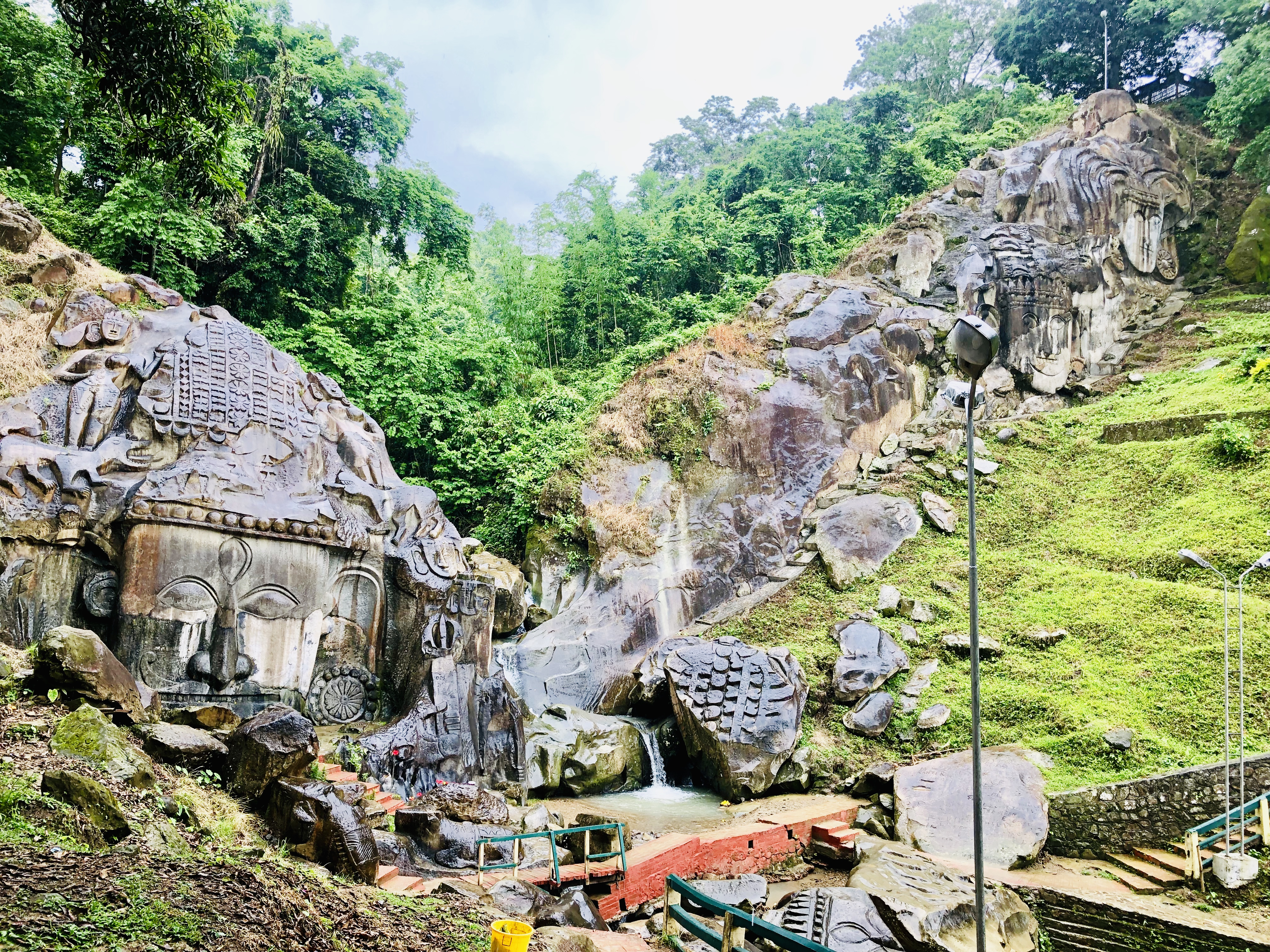
The rock wall

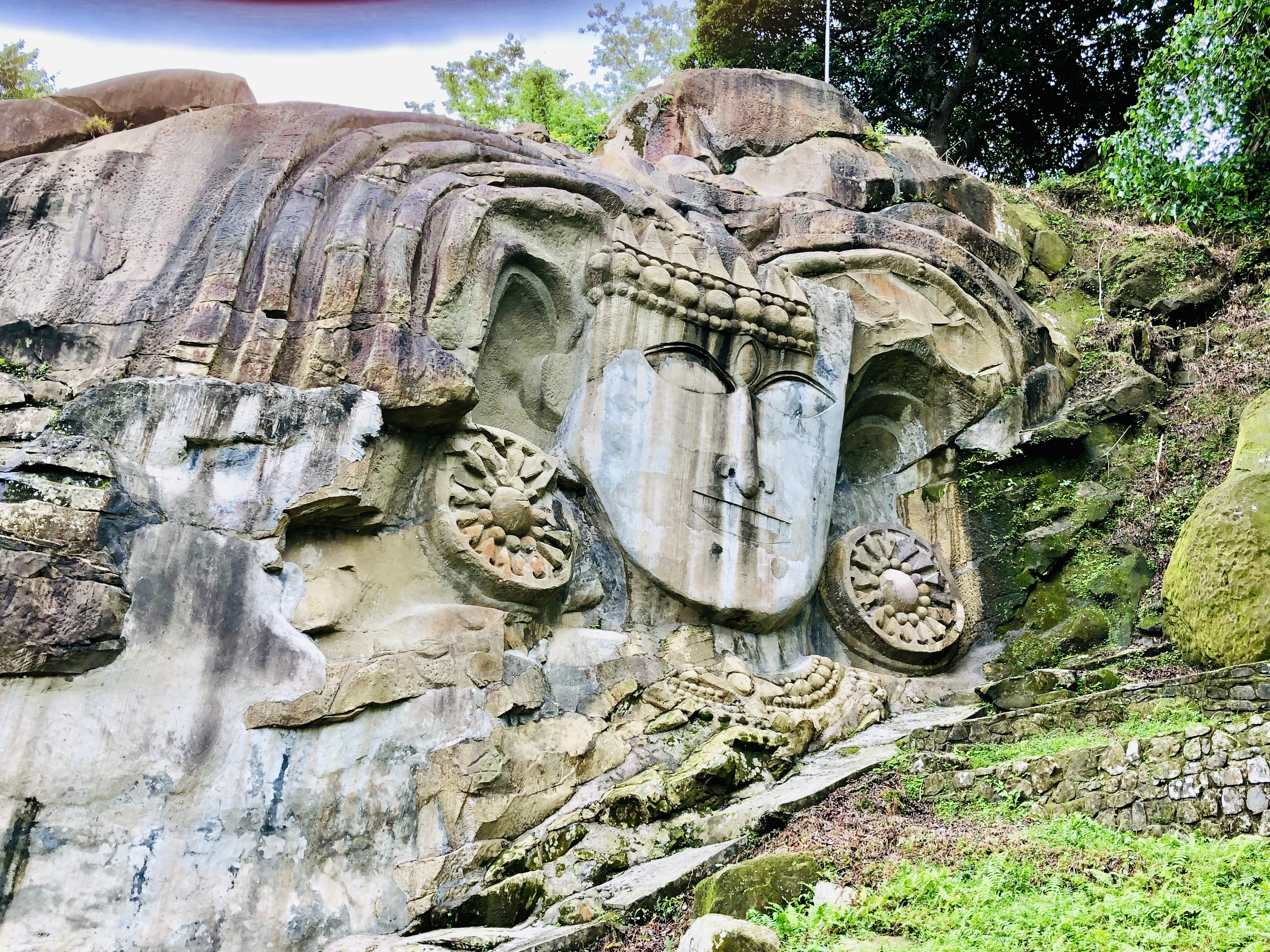
Shiva

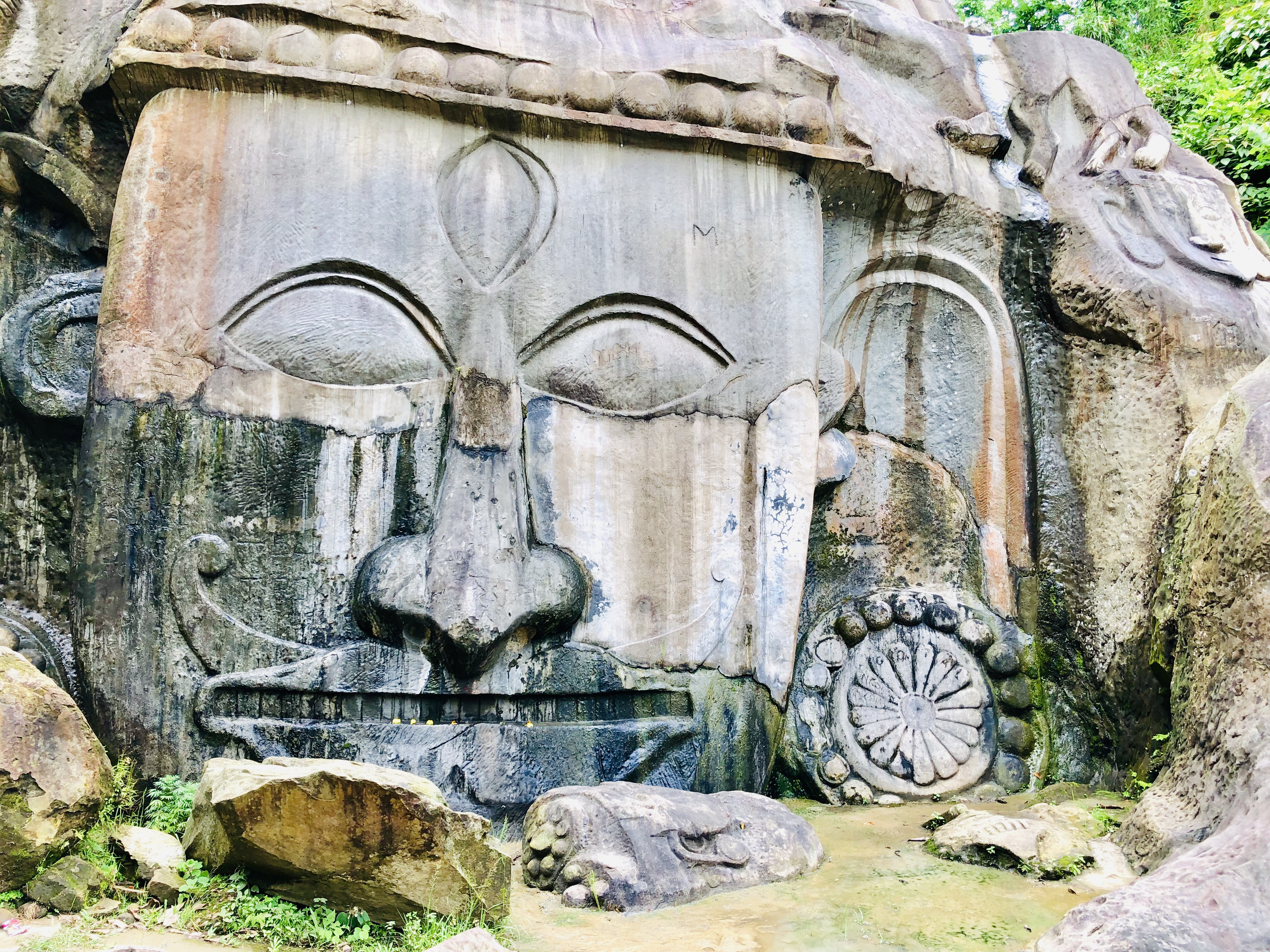
Rock-cut sculpture of Shiva at Unakoti

== Transport ==
The National Highway 8 (NH 8), running from Karimganj in Assam to Sabroom in Tripura, passes through this district.

The Lumding–Sabroom line of Northeast Frontier Railway passes through Unakoti district. The main train station in district is Kumarghat railway station, providing connectivity to Tripura capital Agartala and Assam, alongside other major cities, such as Dharmanagar, Udaipur and Belonia.

== Villages ==
- Darchawi
- Kanchanbari
- Kaulikura
- Ujan Dudhpur
