= National Highway 208A (India) =

National highway in India

National Highway 208A
- Map of the National Highway in red

Route information
- Length: 79 km (49 mi)

Major junctions
- South end: Kailashahar
- North end: Kukital

Location
- Country: India
- States: Tripura, Assam

Highway system
- Roads in India; Expressways; National; State; Asian
← NH 8	→ NH 208

National Highway 208A, commonly referred to as NH 208A is a national highway in India. It is a spur road of National Highway 8. NH-208A traverses the states of Tripura and Assam in India.

== Route ==
Tripura

Kailashahar, Dharmanagar, Kadamtala, Premtola, Kurti RCC Bridge - Assam border.

Assam

Tripura border - Kathaltali, Kukital, Chand Khera.

== Junctions ==
NH 8 Terminal near Kailashahar.
NH 208 Terminal near Kukital.

== See also ==
- List of national highways in India
- List of national highways in India by state
