= Dharmanagar =

- Town
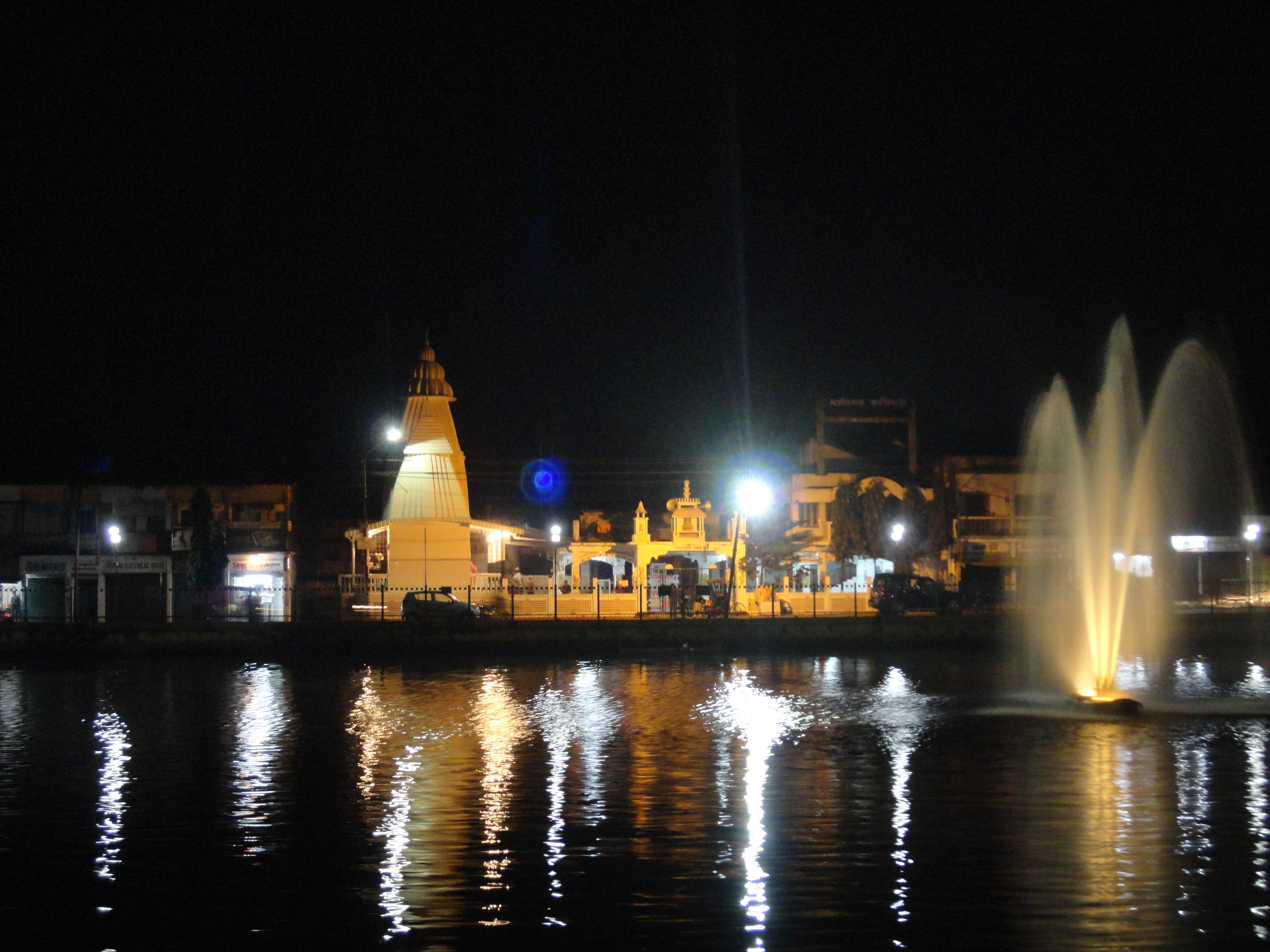
- Dharmanagar Kali Dhighi Ghat

- Location of Dharmanagar in Tripura Dharmanagar (India)
- Coordinates: 24°22′42.7″N 92°10′41.9″E
- Country: India
- State: Tripura
- District: North Tripura

Government
  - Type: Municipal Council
  - Body: Dharmanagar Municipal Council

Area
  - Total: 7.77 km^{2} (3.00 sq mi)
- Elevation: 21 m (69 ft)

Population (2015)
  - Total: 45,887
  - Rank: Second largest town of Tripura after capital Agartala.
  - Density: 396/km^{2} (1,030/sq mi)

Languages
  - Official: Bengali, Kokborok, English
- Time zone: UTC+5:30 (IST)
- PIN: 799250, 799251, 799253
- Telephone code: 03822
- Vehicle registration: TR 05 XX YYYY
- Website: www.northtripura.gov.in

Dharmanagar (Bengali pronunciation: [dhɔrmonɔgor]), is a town with a municipal council in the state of Tripura in northeastern part of India. It is the administrative center for North Tripura district, located in the northernmost region of the state near the Bangladesh border on the east and the India-Bangladesh border on the west. It is the second largest urban area in the state just after Agartala, which makes it one of the important commercial centres in whole of the hilly state. The Juri River flows through the town.

== Geography ==
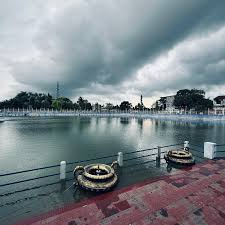
Dharmanagar Kali Dhighi Ghat 2024

The exact geographical boundaries of Dharmanagar during the ancient times have not been clearly documented. However, a general idea about the size obtained from various sources indicate that one major position of Sylhet (now in Bangladesh) was included in Dharmanagar.. Sources also indicate that Dharmanagar in those days was not as small as it is today. The size of Dharmanagar has been greatly diminished over the ages and what was once the mighty capital of Tripura has now been reduced to a district town of the state.

Currently, Dharmanagar is bound by Moulvibazar of Sylhet, Bangladesh in the North, Karimganj district of Assam in the East and Mizoram state in the South, and Kailashahar subdivision of Unakoti district in the west.

=== Climate ===
Dharmanagar is blessed with a peaceful climate most of the year. However, summer time can be excessively hot, dry, humid and interspersed with rains and thunderstorms. Winter generally starts towards the end of November and lasts until February, where the temperatures can reach very low conditions. The monsoon season in Dharmanagar starts in April during the Bengali month of Baishakh. During the monsoon season, Dharmanagar is inundated frequently due to excessive rainfall and flooding by the local rivers.

Climate data for Dharmanagar
Month	Jan	Feb	Mar	Apr	May	Jun	Jul	Aug	Sep	Oct	Nov	Dec	Year
Record high °C (°F)	30 (86)	33 (91)	38 (100)	40 (104)	38 (100)	40 (104)	37 (99)	37 (99)	37 (99)	35 (95)	32 (90)	28 (82)	40 (104)
Mean daily maximum °C (°F)	23 (73)	25 (77)	30 (86)	31 (88)	31 (88)	31 (88)	32 (90)	32 (90)	31 (88)	30 (86)	27 (81)	24 (75)	29 (84)
Mean daily minimum °C (°F)	10 (50)	12 (54)	15 (59)	20 (68)	22 (72)	25 (77)	25 (77)	25 (77)	24 (75)	21 (70)	16 (61)	11 (52)	19 (66)
Record low °C (°F)	5 (41)	6 (43)	6 (43)	11 (52)	16 (61)	18 (64)	20 (68)	21 (70)	20 (68)	15 (59)	10 (50)	5 (41)	5 (41)
Average precipitation mm (inches)	11.4 (0.45)	12.8 (0.50)	57.7 (2.27)	142.3 (5.60)	248.0 (9.76)	350.1 (13.78)	353.6 (13.92)	269.9 (10.63)	166.2 (6.54)	79.2 (3.12)	19.4 (0.76)	5.1 (0.20)	1,717.7 (67.63)
Source: wunderground.com

== Demographics ==
Others include Sikhs, Jains & Other religions (0.10%)

Religion in Dharmanagar (2011)
Religion	Percent
Hinduism	92.37%
Islam	6.88%
Christian	0.21%
Buddhist	0.25%
Others	0.29%

The population of Dharmanagar, as estimated in late 2006, is around 32,912.

Dharmanagar has an average literacy rate of 73.66%, higher than the national average of 65.38%: Male literacy is 81.47% and female literacy is 65.41%.

The majority of the population follows Hinduism (92.37%), followed by Islam (6.88%). Buddhism, Christianity, Sikhism and Jainism are followed by less than 1% of the population combined.

Year	Population	Change
1991	25,897	-
2001	30,790	+1.4%
2011	40,595	+2.8%

Languages spoken in Dharmanagar town (2011)
1. Bengali (92.8%)
2. Hindi (2.67%)
3. Others (4.50%)

Dharmanagar town has a population of 40,595 as per the 2011 census. Bengali is spoken by 37,688, Hindi is spoken by 1,085 and 1,822 speak other languages.

As seen in the table where the population 1991 to 2011 is displayed, Dharmanagar had a population of 25,897 in the year 1991 and it rose to 1.45 in 2001 which stood to 30,790 further more the population had increased more 2.4% in the year 2011 and it went to 40,595.

== Transport ==
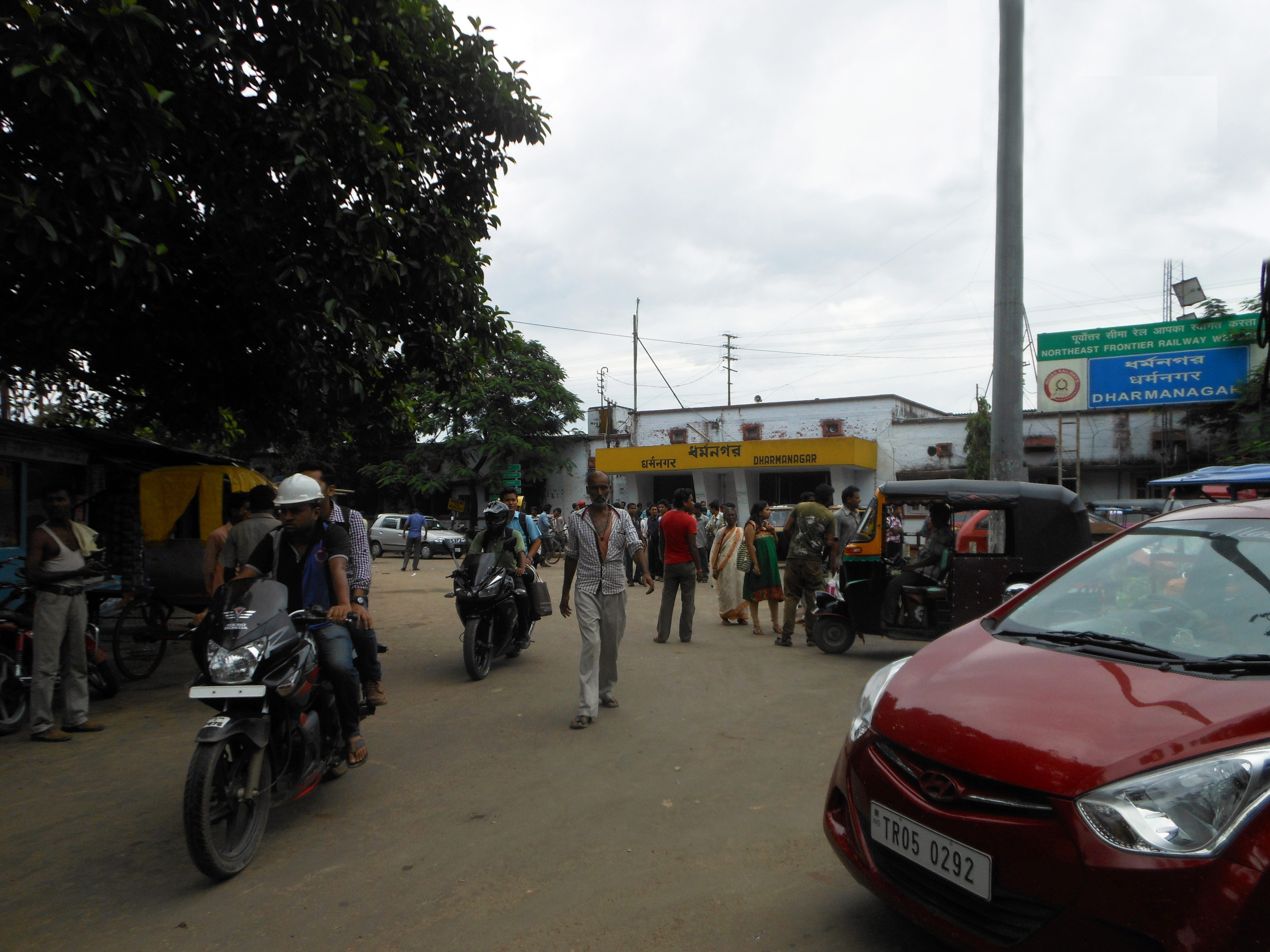
Dharmanagar railway station

The nearest airport to Dharmanagar is in Silchar and airfield at Agartala. There is also a helipad for helicopter rides or for quick journeys to the capital Agartala. Kailashahar Airport was the nearest airport to the city but it is currently non-active and abandoned. Recently the AAI surveyed the zone and has agreed to invest in upgrading the abandoned airport there. The state government has also agreed to acquire 79 acres to support this project.

Daily bus service runs from Dharmanagar to Shillong and Guwahati via NH 8. Bus services to nearby cities of Assam and Tripura from Dharmanagar ISBT are more frequent. Buses also connect Dharmanagar to state capital. Connectivity via bus is one of the most important forms of transportation for local residents.

The city has good train connectivity from Dharmanagar railway station. Daily multiple passenger trains run from Dharmanagar to various parts of the country. Agartala is connected to rest of India through the lines of Dharmanagar. In the year 1964 Dharmanagar becomes the first station of Tripura connected via rail network. Tripurasundari Express, Rajdhani Express, Kanchanjunga Express, Humsafar Express, Habibganj Express, Secunderabad Express, Deogarh Express connects Dharmanagar with cities like Firozpur, Delhi, Kolkata, Bangalore, Bhopal, Hyderabad, Deogarh (Jharkhand) respectively.

== Education ==
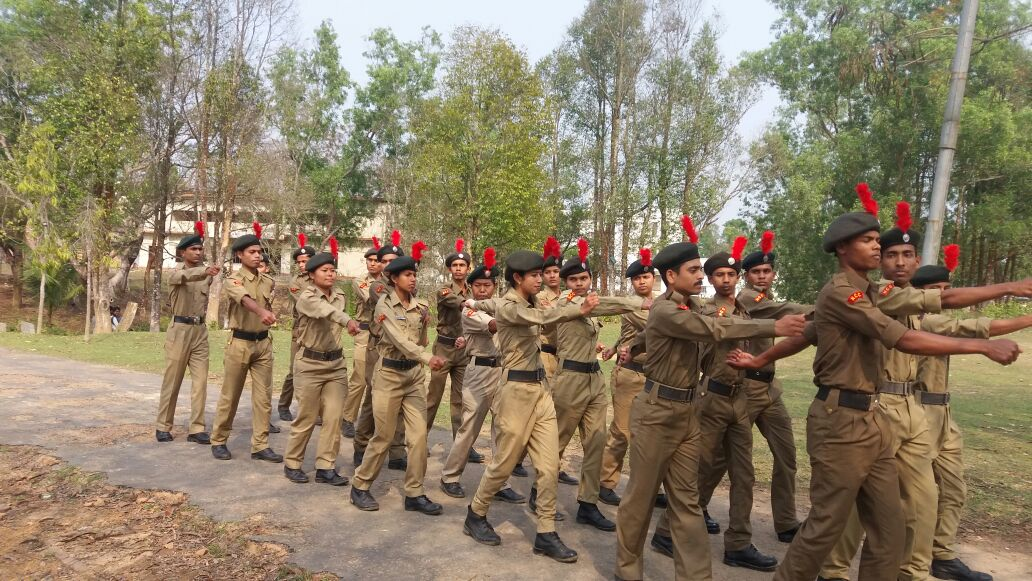
College Student practise NCC drill at Dharmanagar govt. Degree college

There are eight higher secondary schools in Dharmanagar. Padmapur HS School, Bir Bikram Institution, DMR Girls Higher Secondary School, DNV, Chandrapur, Nayapara, Rajbari, Golden Valley H.S (+2 Stage) School, Holy Cross, North Point School, and Siksha Bhavan Montessori School, last four are fully taught in English language. There's also a degree college which is called Government Degree College, Dharmanagar. It has been graded by NAAC and is the highest ranked degree college in Tripura. Siksha Bhavan Montessori School is the Education Partner of TATA Interactive Systems and North Point School is the Education partner of MEXUS Education Pvt. Ltd. for providing Digital classes for the students. The school using the Digital Class System 'Class Edge' brand from the TATA Interactive Systems.

== Neighbouring Towns and Cities ==
North Tripura

Panisagar

=== Unakoti ===
- Kailashahar
- Kumarghat

=== West Tripura ===
- Agartala
- Khowai

=== South Tripura ===
- Udaipur
- Belonia

=== Dhalai ===
- Kamalpur
- Ambassa

=== Outer Tripura ===
- Silchar
- Karimganj
- Kolkata
- Shillong

== Local Sights and Attractions ==
=== Durga Puja Festival ===
During the Durga Puja Festival, the streets come alive and people from the entire town come to the town centre to visit the many statues of goddess Durga scattered around the town. Durga Puja is an annual Hindu festival that celebrates worship of the Hindu goddess Durga. It refers to all the six days observed as Mahalaya, Shashthi, Saptami, Ashtami, Navami and Bijoya Dashami.

The Durga pandals of Dharmanagar secured second place in the Maa Durga contest; after the Capital City of Tripura Agartala.

=== Kali Puja Festival ===
One of the main festivals is the Kali Puja which occurs between October and November. Dharmanagar is also known for its bright lights during this Puja where the entire town is lit up.

=== Temples ===
Temples like Kalibari, Hari mandir, Office Tilla Kalibari, Shib Bari, Ramakrishna Seba Samiti, Choto Kalibari are tourist attractions.

=== Unakoti ===
A short distance away is the ancient site of Unakoti, which literally means "one less a crore" in Bengali, hosts an ancient place of worship with huge rock-cut images and stone idols of Lord Shiva. It is the prime tourist spot of North Tripura District, and is located in the neighbouring town of Kailashahar Subdivision in the North-eastern Indian state of Tripura.

== Politics ==
Dharmanagar is a part of Tripura East (Lok Sabha constituency). The Speaker of Tripura Legislative Assembly Biswa Bandhu Sen represents the Dharmanagar constituency.

== Media & communications ==
=== Radio ===
- All India Radio
- Akashvani (On AM).

=== Newspapers ===
No daily newspaper is published from Dharmanagar, except a few weekly. Daily newspapers published from Agartala, Karimganj and Silchar reaches daily morning in this town. Besides above, national dailies like The Telegraph, Anandabazar Patrika, Dainik Sambad, Bartaman, The Times of India, The Statesman, Hindustan Times etc. are also available.

== See also ==
- List of cities and towns in Tripura
