= Editors Guild of India =

Indian journalism organisation

- Established: 1978
- Founder: Kuldip Nayar
- Headquarters: 4/7- A, INS Building, Rafi Marg, New Delhi-110001
- Location: India
- Region served: India
- President: Sanjay Kapoor
- General Secretary: Raghavan Srinivasan
- Treasurer: Teresa Rehman
- Website: editorsguild.in

Editors Guild of India (EGI) is a non-profit organisation of journalists, particularly the Editors, based in India. The organization has declared "objectives of protecting press freedom and for raising the standards of editorial leadership of newspapers and magazines". It was founded in 1978, by Kuldip Nayar. EGI has represented Indian newspapers in communications to the government.

The first national convention of the Guild was held in Delhi on 18–19 March 1978. The guild does not function as a trade union. EGI is managed by its president with the assistance of General Secretary, a Treasurer and an executive committee.

The official statements of EGI have highlighted the incidents of muzzling of the freedom of press and threats to the safety of journalists but have rarely made any visible impact.

== Organization ==
The members of the Guild are individuals. Institutions cannot be the members. The editors of newspapers, news agencies and periodicals can become its members. The admissions need to be approved by the screening committee.

EGI is managed by its president with the assistance of General Secretary, a Treasurer and an executive committee.

=== Office Bearers ===
The three elected office bearers of the EGI are the President, General Secretary, and Treasurer. All three are elected by the General Body during the Annual General Meeting of the Guild.

Sanjay Kapoor - Editor, Hardnews, is the current President of the Guild. Raghavan Srinivasan - Former Editor, The Hindu Businessline and Teresa Rehman - Editor-in-Chief, Thumbprint NE are the current General Secretary and Treasurer, respectively.

=== Executive Committee ===
According to EGI's rules, Executive Committee has an approved maximum strength of fifteen members. The President after consulting with the senior members of the Guild nominates the executive committee. The President, the General Secretary and the Treasurer are the ex-officio members of the executive committee.

== Activities ==
=== 2002 ===
In 2002, the Editors Guild of India dispatched a three-person delegation to look into the media's role in the 2002 Gujarat riots. Their inquiry discovered that several members of the local (Gujarati language) media were anti-Muslim and had incited violence.

=== 2021 ===
In 2021, EGI demanded a probe by a court-led team, into the death of a journalist during the Lakhimpur Kheri massacre, a vehicle-ramming attack and mob lynching incident during the farmers’ protest against the farm laws passed by the BJP led Union Government. It happened on 3 October 2021 in Lakhimpur Kheri district, Uttar Pradesh, India resulting in deaths of eight people and injuries to 10 others. Four protesters and a journalist named Kashyap were run over by the car, three others were lynched by protestors in the subsequent violence. EGI demanded a probe by a court-led team, into the death of a journalist and the incident. EGI stated, "In what is clearly a terror attack meant to spread fear amongst the farmers, the killing of Kashyap raises many questions. The Editors Guild demands that the death of Kashyap be separately probed by a Court-led special investigation team to ascertain the circumstances of his death and also attempt to recover and use the footage of his camera to build the sequence of events leading to his death. EGI is concerned about the varying versions of the incident in different sections of the media. It is imperative for the media to report the facts and not versions."

After the 2021 Tripura riots, a fact-finding team of Supreme Court lawyers visited the area and released a report which highlighted anti-Muslim violence in Tripura. The Tripura Police filed charges against these lawyers under strict anti terror laws of Unlawful Activities Prevention Act (UAPA). The police also filed charges under the UAPA against 102 people including some Indian journalists for protesting, or even merely mentioning, the communal violence on social media platforms and asked Twitter, Facebook and YouTube to freeze their accounts. The EGI released a statement, that said "This is an extremely disturbing trend where such a harsh law, where in the processes of investigation and bail applications are extremely rigorous and overbearing, is being used for merely reporting on and protesting against communal violence," The EGI expressed its outrage at the Tripura police for its coercive action against journalists, claiming that it was an attempt by the Tripura government to divert attention away from its own inability to control violence by the majority religion (Hindu) or to take action against the perpetrators. It criticized the Governments "use of stringent laws like UAPA to suppress reporting on such incidents." The EGI demanded a fair investigation into "the circumstances of the riots instead of penalising journalists and civil society activists". The Guild reaffirmed its earlier request to the Supreme Court that it consider the "unjustifiable" application of laws like UAPA and provide strict guidelines on charging journalists under them.

=== 2022 ===
==== Tek Fog ====
The Guild cited The Wire's investigative report on Tek Fog and said that "several women journalists were subjected to thousands of abusive tweets" to "instill fear in them" and "prevent them from expressing themselves freely and go about their jobs". The Editors Guild of India condemned "the continuing online harassment of women journalists, which includes targeted and organised online trolling as well as threats of sexual abuse." The guild demanded 'urgent steps to break and dismantle this misogynistic and abusive digital eco-system'.

The Guild cited investigative report by The Wire, and urged the Supreme Court to order an investigation into the allegations that the Tek Fog app was used to harass women journalists with abusive tweets. The report had alleged that influential people from the ruling party BJP may be involved.

=== 2023 ===
On September 2, 2023, the Editors' Guild of India released a report on the 2023 Manipur Violence after sending a three-member 'fact finding' team to the state in August. The report was criticised as "false, fabricated and sponsored" by multiple groups. Two Manipur based journalist bodies served legal notices and the Manipur Government filed a FIR against the Guild's president and key members. However, the Supreme Court provided interim protection to the Guild from arrest. In one of the hearings in the Supreme Court, the Guild said that the Army invited it to make an "objective assessment" on the ground in Manipur. On September 15, the Chief Justice of India – D. Y. Chandrachud said the Guild may be right or wrong in its report about "partisan media coverage" of the Manipur violence, but it has a right to free speech to put forth its views in print.

== Publications ==
- Patel, Aakar; Padgaonkar, Dileep; Verghese, B. G. (2002). Rights and Wrongs: Ordeal by Fire in the Killing Fields of Gujarat : Editors Guild Fact Finding Mission Report. Editors Guild of India.
