= NH 108 =

NH 108 may refer to:

- National Highway 108 (India)
- New Hampshire Route 108, United States
