= National Highway 108B (India) =

National highway in India

National Highway 108B
- Map of the National Highway in red

Route information
- Length: 55 km (34 mi)

Major junctions
- South end: Agartala
- North end: Khowai

Location
- Country: India
- States: Tripura

Highway system
- Roads in India; Expressways; National; State; Asian
← NH 8	→ NH 208

National Highway 108B, commonly referred to as NH 108B is a national highway in India. It is a spur road of National Highway 8. NH-108B traverses the state of Tripura in India.

== Route ==
Agartala to Khowai

== Junctions ==
NH 8 Terminal near Agartala.
NH 208 Terminal near Khowai.

== See also ==
- List of national highways in India
- List of national highways in India by state
