= Rosem =

Traditional Indian tribal wind instrument

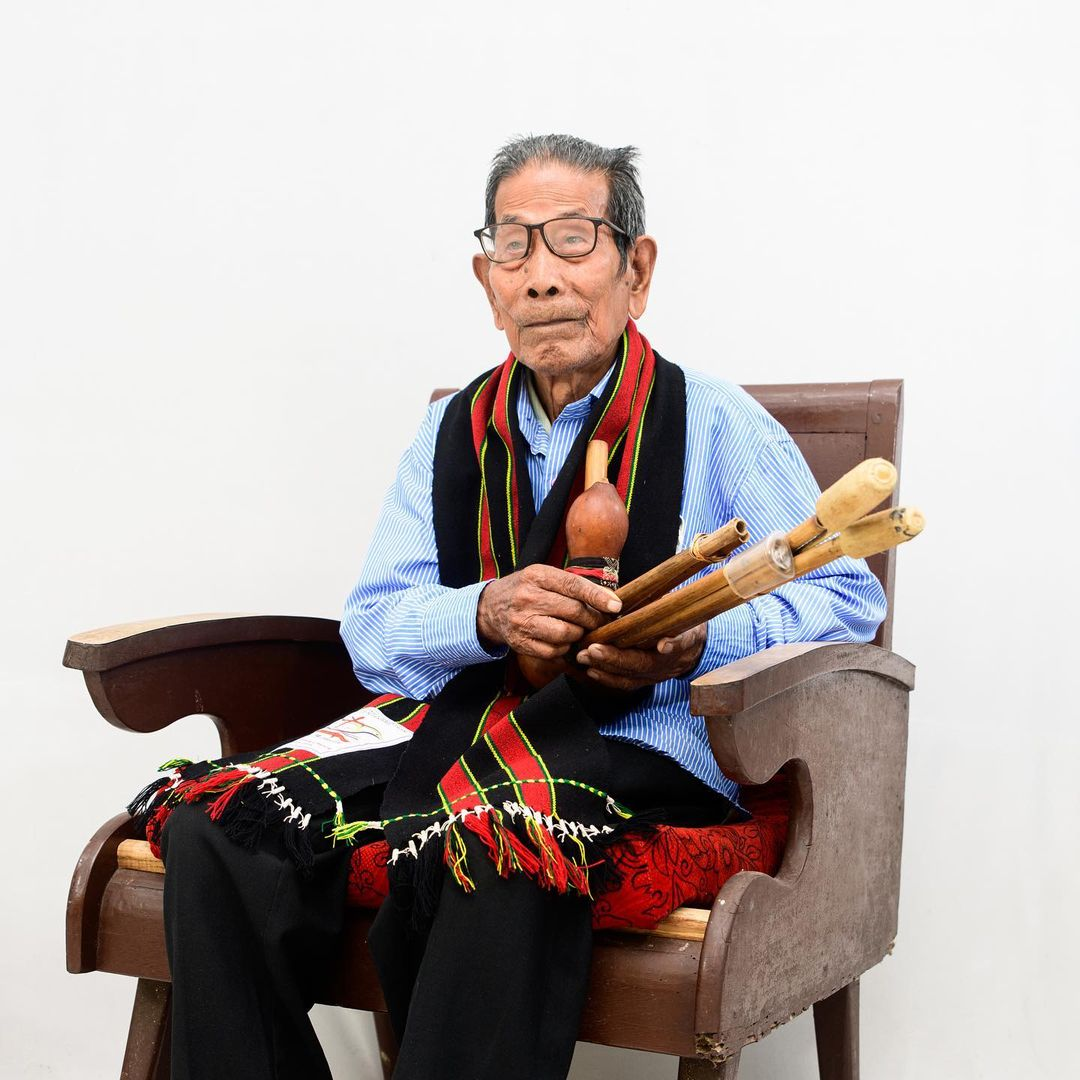
- Folk musician Thanga Darlong holding the Rosem
- Classification: Wind instrument
- Hornbostel–Sachs classification: 421.121 (Flute)
- Inventor: Darlong tribe
- Developed: Traditional use in Tripura, India
- Timbre: Melodic
- Volume: Varies
- Attack: Quick
- Decay: Moderate

Playing range
- Limited to a specific octave Variable

Musicians
- Traditional Darlong musicians

The Rosem is a traditional wind instrument from Tripura, northeastern India, associated with the Darlong tribe. It is made by shaping bamboo and incorporating the Um, a traditional water pot used by the Darlong tribe, which allows it to produce distinctive melodic sounds when played. It is commonly used during tribal ceremonies and festivals.

Historically, the Rosem was played during the Jhum Festival, an agricultural celebration. Today, it accompanies cultural dances like the Bamboo Dance and Bird Dance. The Rosem has a simple design, but it carries significant cultural importance for the Darlong tribe. As fewer artisans are making it, the instrument is becoming rare, leading to increased efforts for its preservation.

Thanga Darlong, a noted Rosem player, was recognized for his contributions to promoting Rosem and received the Padma Shri, the third highest civilian award in India, in 2019.

== See also ==
- Music of Tripura
- Darlong people
- Bamboo musical instruments
- Bansuri
