= Padinjaretheruvu =

- Village
- Location within Kerala
- Coordinates: 9.006709°N 76.807222°E
- Country: India
- State: Kerala
- District: Kollam
- Taluk: Pathanapuram

Languages
  - Official: Malayalam, Tamil
- Time zone: UTC+5:30 (IST)
- Vehicle registration: KL-02, KL-25, KL-77
- Nearest town: Pathanapuram Kottarakara
- Lok Sabha constituency: Mavelikara
- Assembly constituency: Pathanapuram
- Literacy: 93.63%

Padinjaretheruvu is one of the main village of the outskirts of Kottarakkara town, which is 0.5 kilometres (0.31 mi) west of Kizhekketheruvu on the National Highway 208 (NH 208), in Kollam District, Kerala state, India.

== Politics ==
Padinjaretheruvu is a part of Kottarakkara Municipality. It is a part of Kottarakkara assembly constituency in Mavelikkara (Lok Sabha constituency). K N balagopal is the current MLA of Kottarakkara. Kodikkunnil Suresh is the current member of parliament of Mavelikkara.

== Geography ==
Padinjaretheruvu is one of the main junctions in Kottarakkara-Punalur (or Kottarakkara-Pathanapuram) road.

== Demographics ==
Malayalam is the native language of Parankimamukal.
