= Icabpur =

Coordinates: 24.325°N 92.017°E

Icabpur is a village near Kailashahar in North Tripura district of Tripura state of India.
