= National Highway 8 (India) =

National highway in India

National Highway 8
- Map of the National Highway 8 in red

Route information
- Length: 371 km (231 mi)

Major junctions
- North end: NH 37 in Karimganj, Assam
- List: NH 208A in Chandkhira, Assam; NH 108 in Panisagar, Tripura; NH 208 / NH 208A in Kumarghat, Tripura; NH 208 in Teliamura, Tripura; NH 108B in Agartala, Tripura; NH 108A in Jolaibari, Tripura
- South end: R152 in Sabroom, Tripura

Location
- Country: India
- States: Assam, Tripura
- Primary destinations: Patharkandi – Churaibari – Ambasa – Teliamura – Khayerpur – Agartala – Udaipur

Highway system
- Roads in India; Expressways; National; State; Asian
← NH 7	→ NH 9

National Highway 8 (NH 8) is a National Highway in India running from Karimganj in Assam to Sabroom in Tripura. It ends at Maitri Setu, a bridge which connects to the R152 in Ramgarh in Chittagong, Bangladesh.

It is not to be confused with former NH 8 (Delhi-Jaipur-Ahmedabad-Mumbai), which has been renumbered NH 48. The highway is being constructed and maintained by the National Highways and Infrastructure Development Corporation Limited (NHIDCL).

Before renumbering, the whole highway formed a part of NH 44.
