= National Highway 108A (India) =

National highway in India

National Highway 108A
- Map of the National Highway in red

Route information
- Length: 23 km (14 mi)

Major junctions
- East end: Jolaibari
- West end: Belonia

Location
- Country: India
- States: Tripura

Highway system
- Roads in India; Expressways; National; State; Asian
← NH 8	→ NH 8

National Highway 108A, commonly referred to as NH 108A is a national highway in India. It is a spur road of National Highway 8. NH-108A traverses the state of Tripura in India.

== Route ==
Jolaibari - Belonia - Indo/Bangladesh border .

== Junctions ==
NH 8 Terminal near Jolaibari.

== See also ==
- List of national highways in India
- List of national highways in India by state
