= Music of Tripura =

This article "Music of Tripura", documents the music native to Tripura a state of India that has produced a wide variety of folk music. The musician Hemanta Jamatia gained major renown beginning in about 1979, when he became a musical representative for the separatist Tripura National Volunteers. He later on surrendered and returned to normal life, dedicating his work to the folk music of the Tripuri people. In recognition of his contributions to folk and modern music in the Tripuri language, he was awarded the highest honour in the field of music by the Government of India's Sangeet Natak Academy.

== Tripuri folk music ==
Tripuris use musical instruments like the kham made of wood and animal skin, the Sumui (flute) made of bamboo, Sarinda, Chongpreng, Dangdu and cymbals are very famous and popular among indigenous Tripuri people. Tripuri folk music, originating from the indigenous Tripuri people of Tripura, India, is deeply rooted in their cultural traditions and is often accompanied by unique bamboo-based instruments. One of the most iconic features of this music is the use of bamboo flutes and percussion instruments, crafted entirely from locally available bamboo. Instruments like the "Sumui" (a bamboo flute) and "Sarinda", though the latter is partially wooden, are commonly played during festivals, religious ceremonies, and traditional dances.

Bamboo, being abundant in the hilly terrains of Tripura, has been utilized not only for construction and daily tools but also for crafting musical instruments that produce soft, earthy, and rhythmic sounds, reflecting the serene lifestyle and natural surroundings of the Tripuri tribes. These instruments are played solo or in ensembles, accompanying traditional songs that often depict tales of love, nature, daily life, and ancestral legends.

Tripura Tribal Areas Autonomous District Council (TTAADC). (n.d.). Cultural Heritage of Tripura.

== Notable musicians from Tripura ==
Thanga Darlong (born 1920, died aged 103) was a folk music artist from Tripura, who is notable for playing and preserving the legacy of the tribal instrument the "Rosem", he was listed in Guinness World Records 2024 edition as the Oldest Male Folk Musician, then aged 98 years 319 days.
