= Manu River (Tripura) =

River in Tripura, India and Bangladesh

Coordinates: 24°35′N 91°44′E

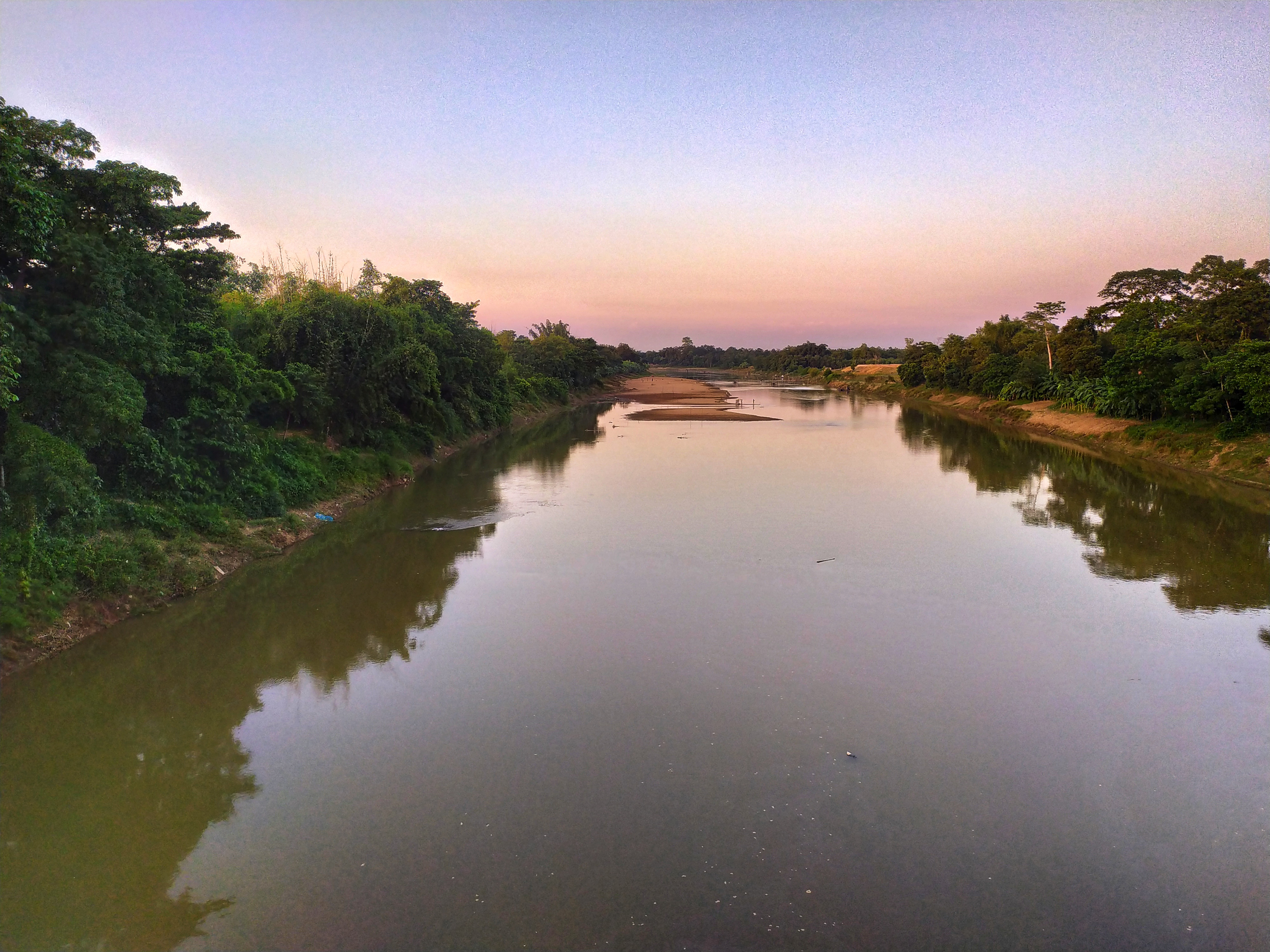

- Location within India Location within Bangladesh
- Native name: মনু নদী (Bengali)

Location
- Countries: India and Bangladesh
- State(s): Tripura; Sylhet
- District(s): Unakoti; Moulvibazar
- Cities: Kailashahar & Kumarghat (India); Moulvibazar (Bangladesh)

Physical characteristics
- Length: 167 km (104 mi)

The Manu is a transboundary river in Bangladesh and India. It originates below the Kahosib Chura of the Shakhantang Mountains in the Indian state of Tripura. Flowing north-east through Kumarghat and Kailasahar, the Manu passes through the Moulvibazar district of Bangladesh to the Sylhet Plain. Later the Dholai River joins the Manu and then it flows northwest and meets the Kushiara Manumukh. It is 167 km (104 m) long, making it the longest river in Tripura. In Tripura, it flows near the town of Manu. The river has a width of 200 meters in the railway bridge area. The area of the basin is 500 square kilometres. The river flows throughout the year.

== Legend ==
Some believe that a Hindu Shastrakar, Manu, used to worship Shiva on the banks of this river, hence the name of the river.

== See also ==
- List of rivers in Bangladesh
