= Panisagar railway station =

Railway station in Tripura, India

Panisagar Railway Station

General information
- Location: Panisagar Railway Station, Panisagar, North Tripura, Tripura; India
- Coordinates: 24.2726982°N 92.1491435°E
- Elevation: 45 m (148 ft)
- System: Indian Railways station Regional rail
- Owner: Indian Railways
- Operator: Northeast Frontier Railway
- Line: Lumding–Sabroom section
- Platforms: 2
- Tracks: 3
- Connections: Auto rickshaw

Construction
- Structure type: Standard (on-ground station)
- Parking: Available

Other information
- Status: Functioning, Multiple Diesel-Line
- Station code: PASG
- Zone(s): Northeast Frontier Railway zone
- Division(s): Lumding

History
- Opened: 2008; 18 years ago
- Rebuilt: 2016; 10 years ago

Services
Preceding station	Indian Railways	Following station
Pencharthal towards ?	Northeast Frontier Railway zone Lumding–Sabroom section	Dharmanagar towards ?
Location
- Location within Tripura

Panisagar Railway Station is located at Panisagar in Tripura, India. It is an Indian railway station of the Lumding–Sabroom line in the Northeast Frontier Railway zone of Indian Railways. The station is situated at Panisagar in North Tripura district in the Indian state of Tripura. Total 8 Passengers trains halt in the station.

== History ==
Panisagar railway station became operation in 2008 with the metre-gauge line from Lumding to Agartala but later in 2016 entire section converted into broad-gauge line.

== Details ==
The station lies on the 312 km-long 1,676 mm (5 ft 6 in) broad-gauge Lumding–Sabroom railway line which comes under the Lumding railway division of the Northeast Frontier Railway zone of Indian Railways. It is a single line without electrification.

== Services ==
- 2 trains per day run between Agartala and Dharmanagar. The train stops at Panisagar station.
- 1 train per day runs between Agartala and Silchar. The train stops at Panisagar station.

== Station ==
=== Station layout ===
G	Street level	Exit/Entrance
P1	Side platform No- 1, doors will open on the left
P1		→
P1	Side platform No- 2, doors will open on the left
P2

=== Platforms ===
There are 2 platforms and 3 tracks. The platforms are connected by foot overbridge.
