= Darlong language =

Sino-Tibetan language of India

Darlong
- Native to: India
- Region: Tripura
- Ethnicity: Darlong
- Native speakers: (6,000 cited 1998)
- Language family: Sino-Tibetan: Tibeto-Burman; Central Tibeto-Burman (?); Kuki-Chin-Naga; Kuki-Chin; Central; Mizoic; Hmaric; Darlong
- Writing system: Latin

Language codes
- ISO 639-3: dln
- Glottolog: darl1242

Darlong (also known as Dalong) is a Kuki-Chin language spoken primarily in Kailashahar and Kamalpur of Tripura, India and parts of Bangladesh. It is written in Latin script.
