= Tripura Police =

State police force of Tripura, India

- Common name: Tripura Police
- Abbreviation: TP
- Motto: সেবা, বীরতা, মিত্রতা Service, Courage, Friendship

Agency overview
- Formed: 1965
- Employees: 28,031

Jurisdictional structure
- Operations jurisdiction: Tripura, India
- Tripura Police jurisdictional area
- Area: 10,492 square kilometres (4,051 sq mi)
- Population: 360,740
- General nature: Local civilian police

Operational structure
- Overseen by: Government of Tripura
- Headquarters: Fire Brigade Chowmuhani Agartala
- Agency executive: Shri Anurag Dhankar, IPS, Director General of Police
- Parent agency: Tripura Police
- Law enforcements: Headquarter of Tripura Police

Facilities
- Stations: 65

Website
- Tripura Police Website

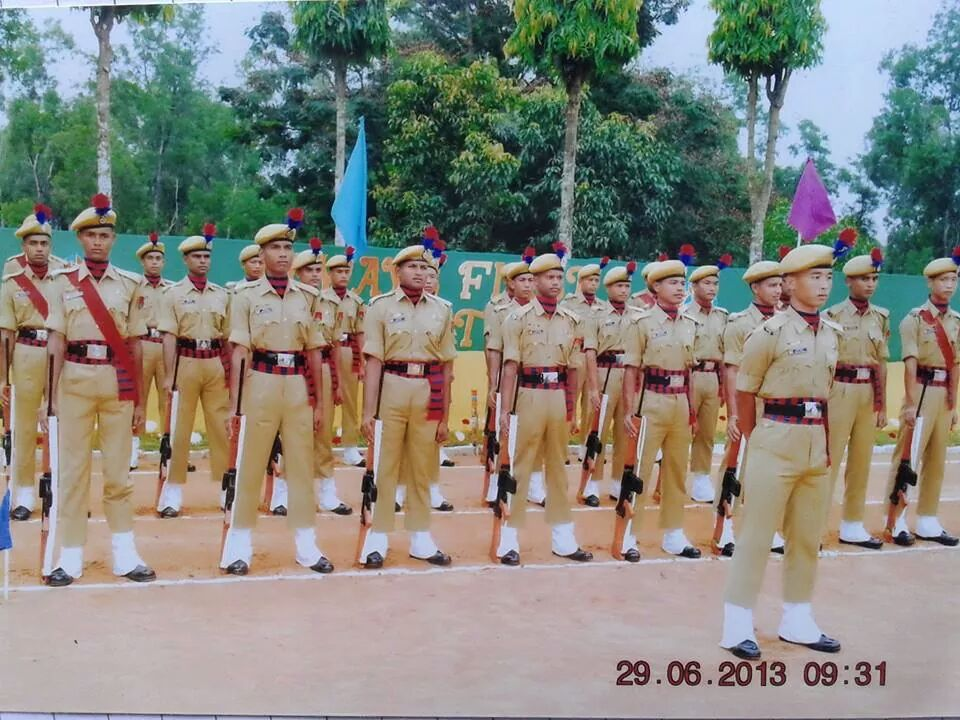
Tripura police

Tripura Police is the law enforcement agency of the state of Tripura which organizes and is responsible for policing activities in the state of Tripura, Northeast India. It was formed in the year 1965.

== Administration ==
The Director General of Police (DGP) of Tripura is the head of the organization who is decorated with an office at Police Headquarters (PHQ) located at Agartala, the capital of Tripura State. There are several Inspectors General of Police (IGP's) working under him. IGP (Law and Order), IGP (Administration), IGP (AP and OPs), and IGP (Intelligence) who are decorated with respective offices at the PHQ complex, Agartala. Several DIGPs (Deputy Inspector General of Police) are under the command and control of the DGP, Tripura. Most notable DyIGPs are DyIGP (Intelligence), DyIGP (Headquarters), DyIGP (Admin), and DyIGP (AP and OPs); and on the operation of Law and Order, DyIGP (Southern Range) and DyIGP (Northern Range). Under them are eight District SSPs (Superintendents of Police) for eight districts, namely West Tripura District, Sipahijala District, Gomati District, South Tripura District, Dhalai District, Khowai District, Unakoti District, and North Tripura District. All such District Superintendents of Police are assisted by respective Additional Superintendents of Police; Deputy Superintendents of Police (District Intelligence Branch) posted at the District Headquarters; and respective Sub-Divisional Police Officers (posted at respective sub-division headquarters). Such sub-divisional police officers supervise and monitor the day-to-day activities and working of police stations under them. All the police stations are staffed with one officer in charge (not below the rank of sub-inspector and not above the rank of inspector).

== Controversy ==
The members of the LGBT community alleged that the police officers forced them to strip in front of other male and female police officers. The victims' individuals were forced to give an undertaking not to cross-dress.

== Equipment and vehicles ==
All the equipment for the Tripura Police are manufactured indigenously by the Indian Ordnance Factories controlled by the Ordnance Factories Board, Ministry of Defence, Government of India.

- Baton (General beat purpose)
- Lee–Enfield .303 (Standard issue. Phased out)
- SLR rifle
- 1B1INSAS Rifle. (Present standard issue)
- Sterling submachine gun (VIP Protection. Phased out)
- Sten Gun (VIP protection. Phased out)
- Akm (For special operations) Indian AKM
- AK-47 (VIP protection & standard guards issue)
- Heckler & Koch MP5 (VIP protection) Limited quantity
- Bren light machine gun
- PKM Machine Gun (Limited quantity)
- Pistol Auto 9mm 1A (Standard service weapon for officers above the rank of sub-inspector)
- Glock 17 (Standard service weapon for officers above the rank of sub-inspector)
- Revolver (officer's service weapon. Being phased out)

=== Vehicles ===
- Toyota Innova (Official car for high-ranked officers)
- Mahindra Scorpio (Official car for high ranked officers)
- Tata Safari (VIP protection & convoy)
- HM Ambassador (VIP officers)

Vehicles Used for General Duty purpose.

- Mahindra Bolero
- Maruti Gypsy (patrolling)
- Tata Sumo
- Tata 407 Trucks
- Buses
- TVS Apache (Patrolling)
- Mahindra Commander (Phased out)
