= Manu, Tripura =

Coordinates: 27°31′N 88°35′E

Manu Manughat
- TTADC Village
- Interactive map of Manu
- Country: India
- State: Tripura
- District: Dhalai

Languages
  - Official: Bengali, Kokborok, English
- Time zone: UTC+5:30 (IST)
- Vehicle registration: TR
- Lok Sabha constituency: Tripura East
- Website: tripura.gov.in

Manu is a village in Dhalai district, Tripura, India. It falls under Tripura East Lok Sabha constituency.

== Location ==
National Highway 108 ends at Manu. The nearest major town is Agartala, Tripura. Manu River flows near the village Manu.
