= Darlong people =

Darlong
Darlong
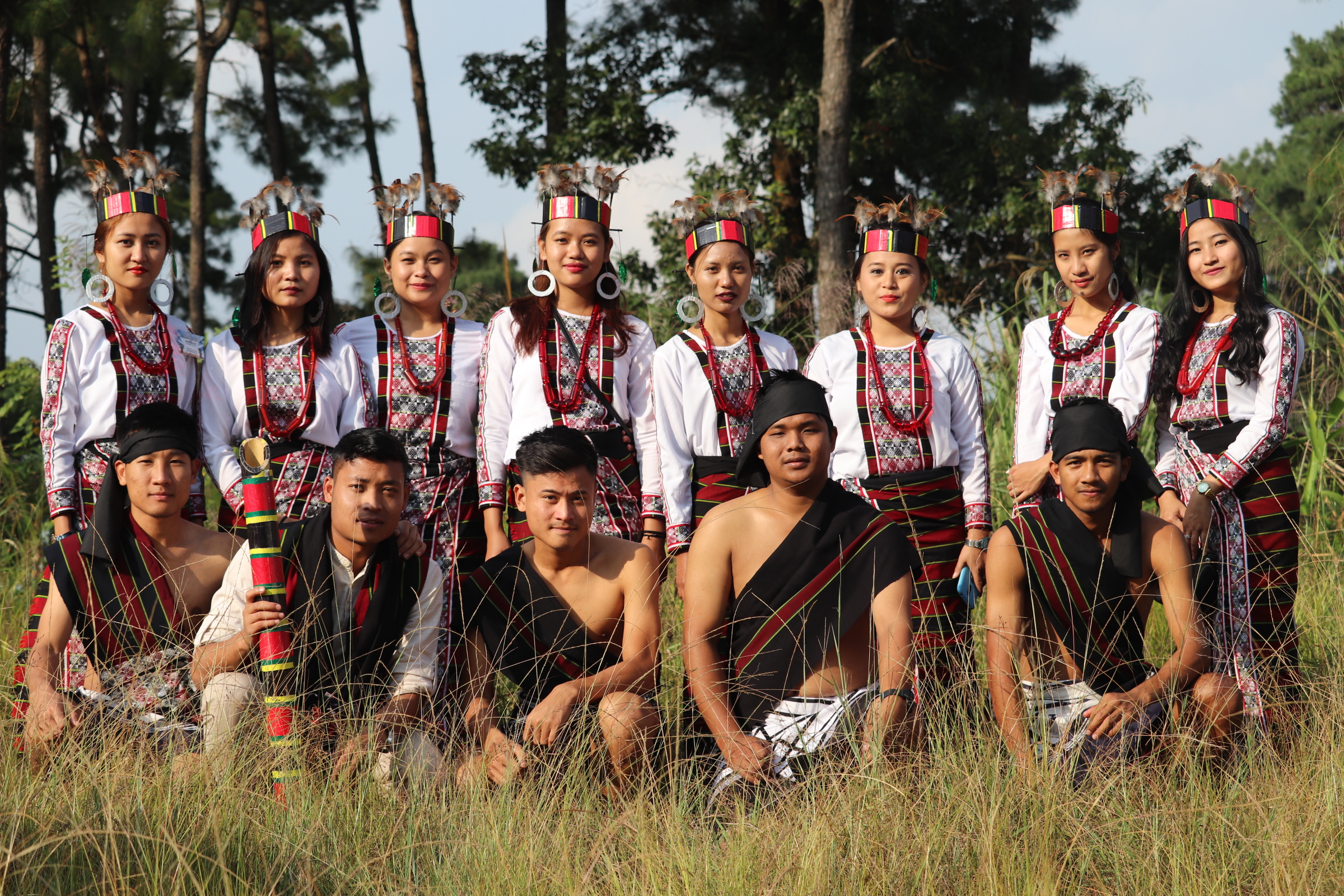
- Darlong boys and girls in traditional dress

Total population
- 11,000

Regions with significant populations
- Tripura, North-East India

Languages
- Darlong · English · Hmar • Mizo

Religion
- Christian

Related ethnic groups
- Chin · Halam · Mizo · Kuki

The Darlong people (Darlong: Darlong hnam) are a sub-tribe of Kuki, living in the state of Tripura, Mizoram and Assam of India. Although the Darlongs of Tripura are not related with the Kuki of another state like Manipur-in terms of languages, culture and Kuki alphabetic but somehow with the Kuki of Tripura they are related so, the Govt of India recognised them as Sub- Tribes of Tripura Kukis. The Darlong call themselves as ‘hriam’ or ‘manmasi’ (hriam means ‘human’. Manmasi which literally means living person. They constitute less than one percent of the population of Tripura.

If you want to know more about Darlong, please read The Darlongs of Tripura written by Letthuama Darlong.

== Origin ==
The Darlong tribe, like many other tribes of the Hmar-Manmasi origin believe that man originated from a certain cave called ‘Sinlung’ which literally interpreted means closed stone of Tibet-China. The Darlong tribe believe that their forefathers came out of this cave one by one, and when the sub-tribe Fatlei came out of the cave, they talked so much and made such loud noise that the guardian-god of the cave fearing that the human population had grown too large closed the cave with a stone preventing any further exit of human beings from the cave. According to another interpretation this tribe made a long halt at Darlong tlang (hill) and came to be known as Darlongs after the name of the hill. This interpretation wins greater reliability on geographical and historical grounds, because the hill still stands as a living witness as Darlong tlang (hill) in the present Mizoram. Besides, the historians are of one opinion that the Darlongs made a long halt at that hill in course of their migration.

According to the 2017 annual report of the DHI (Darlong Hnam Inzom), a total of 24 Darlong villages were reported in Tripura and about 8500 in number.

== Language ==
The Darlong people speak the Darlong language which is more or less mutually intelligible with any of the other Hmar and Mizo languages. It has around 9000 speakers, all of whom are in Tripura state.

== Darlong sub-clans ==
Bawng, Biate, Buangpu, Bethlu, Bawlte, Chongthu(Lersia-Khuntil, Vanchiau), Chonnel, Chante, Chawngte Chongkal, Darngawn, Darrivung, Darte, Fenkol, Hrangchal, Hawlzang, Hnamte, Hauhnar, Hmante, Hmaisak, Hrahsel, Invang, Khawhreng/Khawlhring, Kangbur, Khawl, chorai, Tumchhung, Khupchhung, Khupthlang, Khello, Mualvum, Chhinghel, Khualtu, Lungtai, Laihring, Laitui, Lawnte, Milai, Neitham, Nelriam, Puiloi, Pautu, Punte, Pachuai/Pachuau, Rante/Ralte{Khuangphut(Siakeng, Kawlni, Lelchhun, Khelte)}, Rawite, Renthlei, Ruankhum/Rokhum, Sangate/Chhangte, Saivate, Siate, Songkhar, Thangur (Darlong Chief), Thiak, Thlangsasuan, Thlaute, Thlukte, Tualngen, Thuamte, Thlangte, Vanghroi/Vangchhia, Vangkal, Varte, Vaiphei, Zate, Zongte, Zote, Tualte, Hekte, Hrangate, Tuahlawr, Khawzawl, Khothei.

Most of the clans present in Darlong are also found present in the sub-tribes and clans of Hmar and the Mizo people. One cannot but interpret this as a proof that these communities, all had shared ancestor in the past.

== Society ==
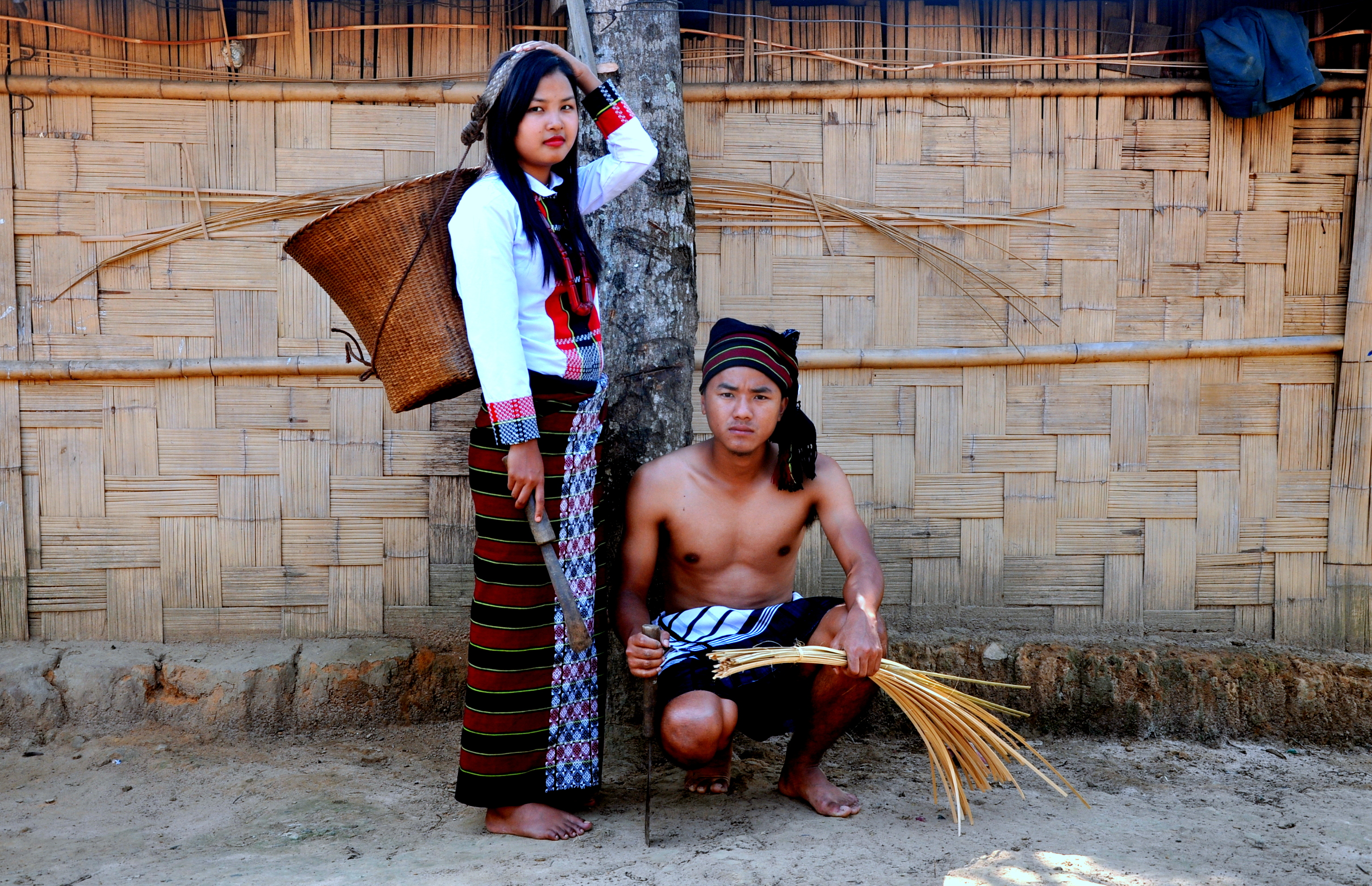
Darlong couple in traditional attire

The people are simple, hard-working, straightforward and honest with a high standard of integrity. In the social front the Darlong code of ethics is based on the concept of ‘tlawminngaina’. Tlawminngaina to a Darlong stands for self-sacrifice, selflessness, kindness and love. A Darlong (Hriam) must be hospitable, kind, unselfish, compassionate and helpful to others. The whole village is involved in important occasions like celebration of birth of a newborn child, marriage in the village and death of a person in the village or a community feast arranged by a member of the village.

=== The village ===
The Darlong tribes traditionally live in villages and prefer joint family. The village is a closely knit unit consisting of households of different clans. As of 2021, there are 24 Darlong villages in Tripura. Darchawi is the largest village and Boitang is the oldest village, among all the villages. The Darlong villages are roughly scattered around the Northern parts of Tripura in three districts, viz. Unokoti, Dhalai and North Tripura. According to 2021 Census there are 1840 Households in Darlong villages, the population is 4764 males and 4852 females (according to 2021 Census).

Research into the traditional Darlong family shows that women played key roles in household management, weaving, food preparation, and childcare. Physical attractiveness was one among several qualities considered in the selection of marriage partner including skills such as weaving or dancing were also highly valued.

=== Horticultural activities ===
Traditionally the Darlong people practised shifting cultivation. Many of their traditional values, songs, dance and hunting activities revolved around the cycles of shifting cultivation (jhum), called as ‘loi’. The principal crops grown by the tribe are pineapple, litchi, and mangoes although a majority have switched over to rubber plantations in the past few years.

=== The Bukpui system ===
The Bukpui, or the bachelor dormitory system, used to be an essential part of Darlong life. In Lusei which is called as Zawlbuk. Apart from the family, it was the most important educational system of the people. It was mandatory for all the youths over 15 years of age to stay in the Bukpui, where they received training in 'tribal welfare, wrestling, hunting and village government'. These Bukpuis are often of great size, and are on much higher platforms than the other houses. To reach the platforms, notched logs of wood serve as staircases, and long pieces of cane are often suspended from an overhanging beam close to the notched logs to assist the inmates to climb up and down. The boys who went to the Bukpui emerged as complete men. The Bukpui began to lose its importance after the appearance of the British on the scene. With the onset of modernity, the Bukpui system is no longer in practice among the tribe.

=== Marriage ===
The Darlong people prefer exogamous marriage system. They prefer to marry someone outside their own clan. Sibling incest is legal among the Darlong people. Traditionally polygamy was allowed, but monogamy has been strictly enforced by the various churches. The wife or husband moves permanently to the husband's or wife's village upon marriage - depends on the individual.

=== Teknonymy ===
It is a cultural tradition of the Darlong tribe and it is still occasionally used. The parents of a child named X will generally be known as ‘X-Pa’ and ‘X’Nu’. If Mr. Liana and his wife have a son called Nema, Mr.Liana will be called ‘Nema pa’, and his wife as ‘Nema nu’. In most villages, parents are addressed by the name of their first-borne child.

== Religion ==
Until the time Christianity was introduced to the tribe, the Darlong people practiced animistic monotheistic religion. They believed that the hills, trees and streams were inhabited by various demons or spirits. These are known as Rithla or Huai. These spirits are uniformly bad and all the troubles and ills are attributed to them. The spirits of the dead were believed to inhabit the other worlds. Those whose spirits were admitted in Pialral (beyond the Pial river) could live in a state of perpetual bliss. The Darlong people believed in one supreme being called ‘Pathian’ who is omnipotent and omnipresent.

=== Christianity and its impact: (1919–present) ===
The Darlong people embraced Christianity in the year 1919. Since then they came out to mainstream of life without turning back to their Old life style. However, the early Darlong Christians had to meet opposition from their own people. They were driven out of the village by the chief and were despised by their family members, relatives and friends. The Christians with their evangelist leader Zatuaha(11.10.1919), established a Christian village at Darchawi in 1923. It is now the biggest and most populated Darlong village in Tripura.

Christianity has brought a great change on the customs and lifestyle of the once semi-nomadic tribe. The Tripura Baptist Christian Union was formed by the New Zealand Baptist Mission in December 1938. The Darlong Church joined TBCU in 1940. By 1972, the whole Darlong tribe became Christians. There is no denying that adoption of Christianity has helped them in advancement in many ways.

The different denominations among the Darlong Christians are: Tripura Baptist Christian Union, Roman Catholic, Evangelical Free Church of India, Independent Church of India, Presbyterian Church, United Pentecostal Church, and the Kuki Christian Council. Although Christianity brought about a near - total transformation in the Darlong lifestyle and outlook, some customary laws have stayed on. The customs and traditions which they found meaningless and harmful were abolished by persistent preaching. Thus, tea replaced ZU as a popular drink among the Darlong tribe. Bukpui had been replaced by modern education.

The first New Testament in Darlong was published in 1987 by Bibles for the World, second New Testament was published in 1995 by Bibles International, Ohio (USA) and again New Testament with Psalms & Proverbs was published by Bible Society of India, Bangalore (India) in 1996 and then finally the complete Bible was published by Global Friendship Mission in 2010 in collaboration with Evangelical Free Church of India. The first translation of New testament in Darlong was headed by Rev. Hrengngura Darlong.

== Culture ==
=== Folk song and dances ===
The Darlongs are fun loving people. They love to sing and dance. Merry-making and celebrations were part of their social life. Most of their songs and dances are imitation of nature, birds and animals, as well as events in the different cycles of shifting cultivation. Folk dances of the tribe are mostly performed in groups in synchronized fashion, by both men and women, depending on the type of dance. Dances are usually performed at festivals and religious occasions.

1. Fahrel Inkan or Cheraw: In earlier times this dance was usually performed to build up confidence and ease the pain of a pregnant woman during childbirth. It is also performed to ensure safe passage for the soul of a mother who died at childbirth. Fahrel Inkan is, therefore, a dance of sanctification and redemption performed with great care, precision and elegance. Long bamboo starves are used for this dance, therefore many people call it 'Bamboo Dance'. The dancers move by stepping alternatively in and out from between and across a pair of horizontal bamboos, held against the ground by people sitting face to face on either side. They tap the bamboos in rhythmic beats. The patterns and stepping of the dance have many variations. Sometimes the steppings are made to imitate the movement of birds, or the swaying of trees and so on.
2. Chem Lam.
3. Khual Lam.
4. Salu Lam.
5. Silai Lam.
6. Parkam Lam.
7. Vathu Indi Lam.
8. Riki Fachawi Lam.
9. Arte Tual Phit Lam.
10. Sate Tual Infai Lam.
11. Pualvachang Hem Lam.

The origin of Darlong traditional music is inexplicable. The Darlong folk songs can be broadly classified as:

1. Indoi hla: This is the chant or cry raised by the warriors when returning from a successful raid to show his superiority over the enemy, and to let his people know that a successful raid has taken place. No other members of the raiding party can chant Indoi hla.
2. Hlado: Anyone who has witnessed the success of the hunt can chant hlado at any time and place.
3. Thiam hla and dawi hla (Invocation & incantation): These are verse forms chanted by the priest and sorcerers while performing various rituals and ceremonies.
4. Lengzem zai: These are love songs that have no distinctive form but are generally named after the theme. These songs have gained popularity over the last few decades.

=== Musical Instruments ===
The Darlongs in the past had their own music instruments such as theitele, tapual, theikhang, rosem, dar-teng, dar-ribu, dar-khuang, chawngpereng, kaikawng, tuithei, and khuangpui. However, these are no longer prevalent nowadays except rosem.

=== Ornaments ===
Rithei, Kutkhi, Kuarbe, Khuaihnur, Theibuang, Thipawl, Thitak, Thi-eng, Pai (Chemkok) etc.

=== Festivals ===
The Darlong people enjoyed life and celebrated every occasion with dances, drinking (of rice beer, called ‘zu’) and feasting. The Darlong tribe had four annual community festivals called ‘Kut’, which make four different stages of their agricultural process. They are:-

1. Ramzu In or Chapchar Kut: This can be called ‘Spring Festival’. It is celebrated after the hard work of cutting their jhum and before they are burnt, that is towards the end of February and towards the beginning of March. This festival lasts for three to four days.
2. Kangdai Kut: This festival is observed from the evening of the jhum burning day to the following day. It is held in April. Here they make some merriment and appease the Gods for blessings on their jhum and on their health. This does not make a big festivity. Hence it is less significant than the rest of the festivals.
3. Thlantawi Kut: This festival lasts for a day only. This festival is observed in remembrance of their loved ones who have left the world. They prepare and offer the best food on each grave to show their love for the deceased and for their own mental satisfaction.
4. Tharlak or Mim Kut: This festival can be called ‘Autumn Festival’. This festival is particularly observed in honour and remembrance of the dead and the gods. The festival is believed to have originated from the legendary lovers ‘Pangama and Thuitlingi’. Thuitlingi died leaving Pangama. Pangama felt so lonely that he visited his wife in the abode of the dead. There he found that Thuitlingi had become so thin that he promised to feed her with the fast crops, particularly the maize, the harvesting of which precedes that of the paddy. From this the festival came to be known as Mim (maize) Kut.

All these festivals encompass profound inner meanings. However, modernization has caught up with the Darlongs and these festivals are on the wane due to non-practice for decades.

== See also ==
- Darlong language
- Darchawi
- DHI website
