= Kailashahar Airport =

Domestic airport in Kailashahar, Tripura, India

Kailashahar Airport কৈলাশহর বিমানবন্দর
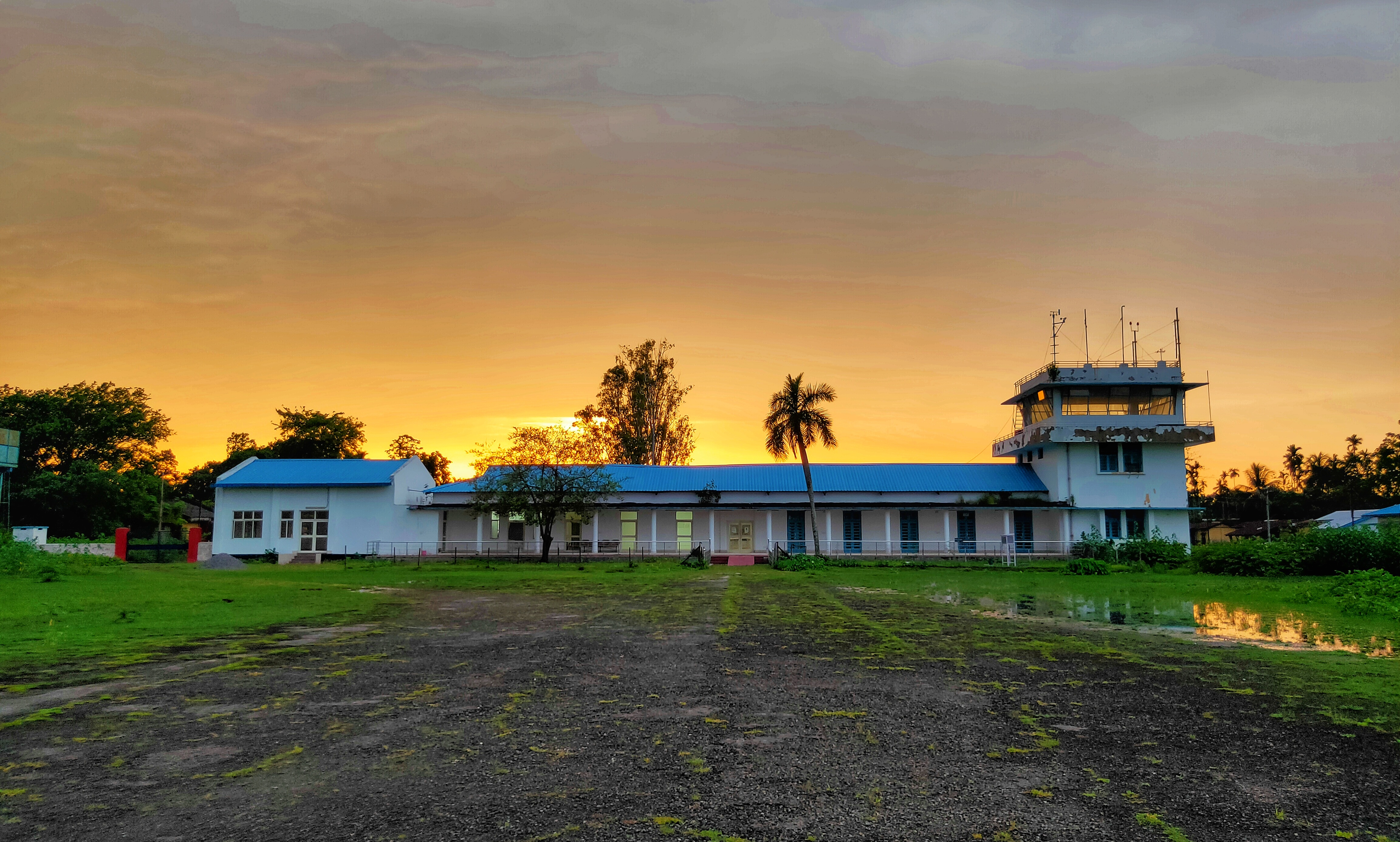
- Image of Kailashahar Airport
- IATA: IXH; ICAO: VEKR

Summary
- Airport type: Public
- Operator: Airports Authority of India
- Serves: Kailashahar
- Location: Kailashahar, Tripura, India
- Elevation AMSL: 24 m / 79 ft
- Coordinates: 24°18′29″N 092°00′26″E

Map
- Location of airport in Tripura IXH (India)

Runways
Direction	Length		Surface
Direction	m	ft	Surface
03/21	1,006	3,300	Asphalt

Kailashahar Airport (IATA: IXH, ICAO: VEKR) is a non-operational airport located at Kailashahar in the state of Tripura, India. The airport was shut down in mid 1990 due to lack of space. In December 2021, A group of 6 Persons of Airport Authority of India (AAI) conducted a Survey to start the airport soon with an aim to facilitate operations at the airport under the UDAN regional connectivity scheme (RCS). In August 2023, a delegation led by Tripura's Transport Minister Sushanta Chowdhury visited the Kailashahar Airport and proposed to revive it. The renovation includes increasing the runway length of the airport by acquiring 700 meters of land in the northern part of the airport.

== Airlines and destinations ==
There is currently no scheduled commercial air service to this airport.
