= Kaulikura =

Village in Tripura, India

Coordinates: 24°17′16.46″N 92°2′4.8″E

Kaulikura is a small village in Unakoti, Tripura, India.
