= National Highway 208 (India) =

National highway in India

National Highway 208
- Map of the National Highway in red

Route information
- Length: 158 km (98 mi)

Major junctions
- East end: Khowai
- West end: Harina

Location
- Country: India
- States: Tripura

Highway system
- Roads in India; Expressways; National; State; Asian
← NH 8	→ NH 8

National Highway 208, commonly referred to as NH 208 is a national highway in India. It is a spur road of National Highway 8. NH-208 traverses the state of Tripura in India.

== Route ==
Kumarghat - Kailashahar - Khowai - Teliamura- Amarpur -Sabroom.

== Junctions ==
NH 8 Terminal near Kumarghat.
NH 8 near Teliamura.
NH 8 Terminal near Sabrum.

== See also ==
- List of national highways in India
- List of national highways in India by state
