= Rubber plant =

Rubber plant is a common name for several plants and may refer to:

- Para rubber tree, a major commercial source of natural rubber
- Castilla elastica, a source of rubber for the ancient Maya people
- Ficus elastica, common ornamental plant
