= Kumarghat railway station =

Railway station in Tripura, India

Kumarghat

General information
- Location: Kumarghat, Tripura; India
- Coordinates: 24.1513°N 92.0353°E
- Elevation: 51 metres (167 ft)
- System: Indian Railways station
- Owner: Indian Railways
- Operator: Northeast Frontier Railway
- Platforms: 2
- Tracks: 4
- Connections: Auto stand

Construction
- Structure type: Standard (on-ground station)
- Parking: No
- Cycle facilities: No

Other information
- Status: Single diesel line
- Station code: KUGT
- Zone(s): Northeast Frontier Railway
- Division(s): Lumding
Location

Kumarghat railway station is a small railway station in Unakoti district, Tripura. Its code is KUGT. It serves Kumarghat town. The station consists of two platforms. The platform is not well sheltered. It lacks many facilities including water and sanitation.

== Major trains ==
- Dharmanagar–Agartala Passenger
