= Panisagar =

- Town
- Location within Tripura Location within India
- Coordinates: 24.25°N 92.14°E
- Country: India
- State: Tripura
- District: North Tripura

Government
  - Type: Nagar Panchayat
  - Body: Panisagar Nagar Panchayat
  - Ruling Party: (Bharatiya Janata Party)
- Elevation: 45 m (148 ft)

Population (2001)
  - Total: 11,938

Languages
  - Official: Mizo, Kokborok, English
- Time zone: UTC+5:30 (IST)
- PIN: 799260
- Telephone code: 03822
- Vehicle registration: TR
- Website: tripura.gov.in

Panisagar is a town and a Nagar panchayat in North Tripura district in the state of Tripura, India. It is also the headquarters of Panisagar Tehsil.

== Geography ==
It has an average elevation of 45 metres above sea level. The town is connected to Dharmanagar and Kailasahar with metalled roads. It can be accessed from the capital city of Agartala via Dharmanagar town. Panisagar is 120 km from Agartala.

== Politics ==
[Binay Bhushan Das (politician)] is the current MLA from Panisagar who won 2018 Tripura Legislative Assembly election.

== Transport ==
National Highway 108 originates from Panisagar and extends up to Aizawl in Mizoram. The nearest airport is the Aizawl Airport which 74 km and as has a railway station called Panisagar railway station which lies on Silchar–Sabroom section. Main rail head is Silchar railway station which is 101 km from Panisagar.

== Education ==
- Regional College of Physical Education, Panisagar
- Kendriya Vidyalaya, Panisagar
- Holy Cross School, Panisagar
- Panisagar Higher Secondary School

== See also ==
- List of cities and towns in Tripura
- North Tripura district
