= National Highway 108 (India) =

National Highway in India

National Highway 108
- Map of the National Highway 108 in red

Route information
- Length: 193 km (120 mi)

Major junctions
- From: Panisagar
- Manu
- To: Aizawl

Location
- Country: India
- States: Tripura, Mizoram

Highway system
- Roads in India; Expressways; National; State; Asian

National Highway 108 (NH 108) is a highway in India. It originates from Panisagar of North Tripura District in Tripura and extends up to Aizawl in Mizoram. It connects Lengpui Airport with the state capital of Mizoram - Aizawl. The highway passes through towns of Zawlnuam and Mamit.

== See also ==
- List of national highways in India
- National Highways Development Project
