= North Tripura district =

- District
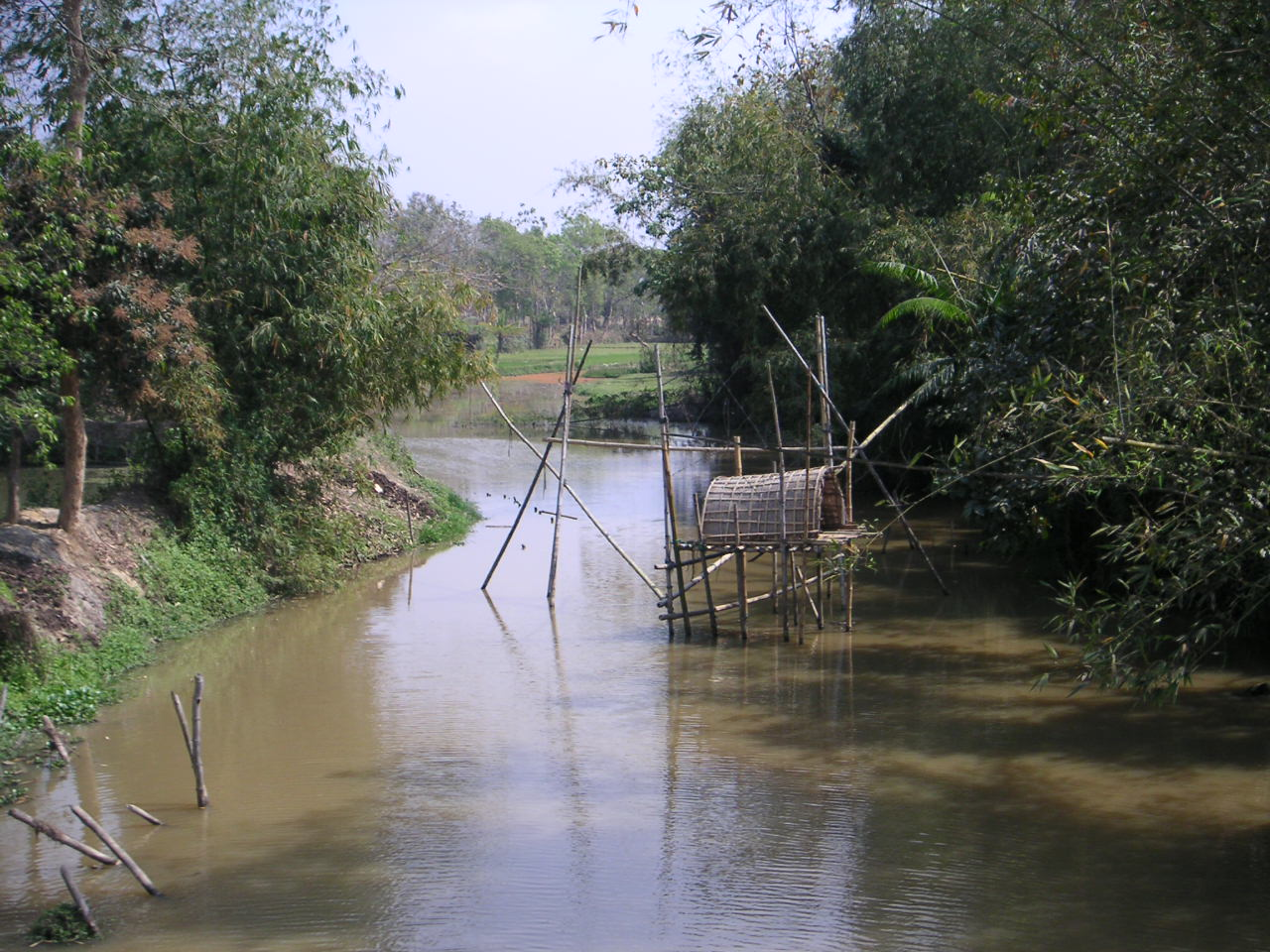
- River scene in North Tripura
- North Tripura district Location in Tripura
- Coordinates: 24°20′N 92°01′E
- Country: India
- State: Tripura
- Headquarters: Dharmanagar

Area
  - Total: 1,422.19 km^{2} (549.11 sq mi)
- Elevation: 29 m (95 ft)

Population (2011)
  - Total: 415,946
  - Density: 292.469/km^{2} (757.490/sq mi)
- Time zone: UTC+05:30 (IST)
- ISO 3166 code: IN-TR
- Website: http://northtripura.nic.in/

North Tripura district is an administrative district in the state of Tripura, India. The district headquarters are in Dharmanagar. The district occupies an area of 1422.19 km^{2} and a population of 693,947 (as of 2024).

== History ==
The area of North Tripura district was originally part of the princely state of Tripura until 9 September, 1949, when it merged with the Union of India. The district formed on 1 September, 1970, when the state was divided into three districts. On 14 April, 1995, Dhalai district was split off from North Tripura. From 21 January, 2012, four more districts were created, so a total of eight.

== Divisions ==
=== Administrative divisions ===
North Tripura is divided into three sub-divisions:

Name	Headquarters	Blocks	Location
Dharmanagar	Dharmanagar	Panisagar; Kadamtala	
Kailashahar	Kailashahar	Gaur Nagar; Kumarghat	
Kanchanpur	Kanchanpur	Dasda; Pecharthal; Damcherra; Jampui Hill	

Subdivision & Blocks. There are 3 nos of Sub-Division and 8 nos of Blocks under North Tripura District.

=== Political constituencies ===
There are eleven assembly constituencies in this district: Pabiachhara, Fatikroy, Chandipur, Kailasahar, Kadamtala-Kurti, Bagbassa, Dharmanagar, Jubarajnagar, Panisagar, Pencharthal and Kanchanpur.

North Tripura district is in the Lok Sabha constituency of Tripura East, shared with Dhalai and South Tripura districts.

=== Villages ===
- Icabpur

== Demographics ==
According to the 2011 census, North Tripura has a population of 693,947. The overall literacy assessment survey (LAS), conducted by SLMA-2016, stated the literacy rate to be 97.22% (97.34 for males, 96.79% for females) and the sex ratio is 967:1000.

There are 35,000–40,000 members of the Bru (Reang) tribe in the district, who came as refugees from Mizoram after 1997 ethnic violence.

== Flora and fauna ==
In 1988, the Rowa Wildlife Sanctuary was established in North Tripura district. It has an area of 0.85 km^{2}.
