= Kailashahar =

- Town
- Location within Tripura Location within India
- Coordinates: 24.33°N 92.02°E
- Country: India
- State: Tripura
- District: Unakoti
- Named for: Hara (Shiva) and Kailasha, abode of Shiva
- Seat: Tripura Legislative Assembly
- Wards: Total 15

Government
  - Type: Municipal Council
  - Body: Kailashahar Municipal Council
  - Chairman: Smt. Chapala Deb Roy (BJP)
  - Vice chairman: Nitish Dey

Area
  - Total: 620.428 ha (1,533.112 acres)
  - Land: 6.19 km^{2} (2.39 sq mi)
- Elevation: 28.36 m (93.0 ft)

Population (2015)
  - Total: ▲23,418
  - Rank: 4th
  - Density: 3,620/km^{2} (9,400/sq mi)

Languages
  - Official: Bengali, Kokborok, English
- Time zone: UTC+5:30 (IST)
- PIN: 799277
- Telephone code: 03824
- Vehicle registration: TR-02
- Website: www.unakoti.nic.in

Kailashahar (Bengali pronunciation: [koi̯laʃhor]), is the fourth largest urban area in the north eastern state of India, Tripura, located near northwest Bangladesh border. It is a Municipal council and the administrative center of the Unakoti district, this city is surrounded by unakoti hills and is situated on the banks of Tripura's longest river, Manu.

Kailashahar is a municipal council under Gaurnagar block. There are a total of 23 village panchayats in Gaurnagar surrounding Kailashahar, among which Rangauti, Bhagabannagar, Knowrabill, Irani are some.

Kailashahar Municipality has a total of 16 wards or constituencies, and these wards consist of several Paras or localities. Some of these paras are, Boulapasa, Govindpura, Srirampur, Kachar Ghat, Pytor Bazar, Durgapur, Cinema Hall Para, Vidyanagar and many more. The urban area of Kailashahar Municipality generally consists of these paras which carry most of the urban population of the town.

== Etymology ==
The name Kailashahar is composed of two terms, Kailash and Har. The word Kailas is derived from Mount Kailash and Har means Shiva. Some people think that the earlier name of Kailashahar was Chambulnagar. Some believed that Hara (Shiva) lived in Kailash. Hence, the place was known as Kailash - Har, which later transformed into Kailashahar.

== History ==
Kailashahar, was the ancient capital of Tripuri Kingdom. Its history is intertwined with Unakoti and it is well known for its stone and rock carvings dating from the 7th–9th centuries AD. A Shiva disciple who started the Tripuravada (Tripuri calendar), prayed for Lord Shiva at Chambulnagar village on the banks of the Mau (Manu) river. It is assumed that the Chambulnagar mentioned in the Rajmala was situated near the Unakoti Hills. The prince prayed for Mahadev in Unakoti. Kailashahar may be the legendary Chambulnagar. Hara (Shiva) lived in Kailasa, which influenced the name of the region to Kailasa Hara, which later transformed in to kailashahar. King Adi-Dharmapha of Tripura ruled there in the 7th century, he performed Yajna with pomp and joy.

== Geography ==
The neighboring towns of Kailashahar are Kumarghat, Dharmanagar, Panisagar and Kanchanpur, which surround the Northeast, East and Southeast sides of the Town, and on the southern side it is surrounded by Kamalpur and Longthari valley subdivisions. The distance of the Town from the capital Agartala is about 136.8 km. The Town shares a 320.46 km long international border with Bangladesh.

Kailashahar is elevated by 28.36 meters from sea level. The Town is surrounded by Unkoti hills and Tripura's longest river, the Manu, flows through the Town into Bangladesh.

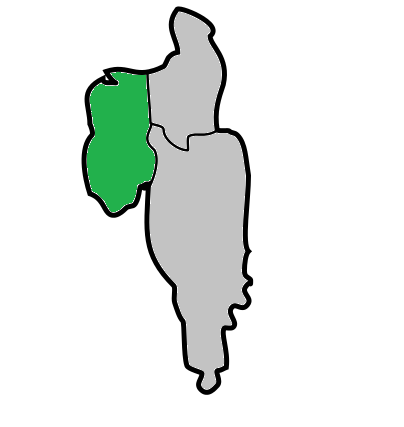
Kailashahar region (Green area)

== Demographics ==
As of 2001 India census, Kailasahar had a population of 23,418. Males constitute 51% of the population and females 49%. Kailasahar has an average literacy rate of 82%, higher than the national average of 59.5%: male literacy is 84%, and female literacy is 79%. In Kailasahar, 10% of the population is under 6.

== Religion ==
Others include Sikhs, Jains & Other religions

Religion in Kailashahar (2011)
Religion	Percent
Hinduism	90.10%
Islam	8.3%
Christian	0.6%
Buddhist	0.17%
Others	0.83%

The majority of the population of Kailashahar practice Hinduism (90.10%), the Town hosts many temples and religious sites, notably Lakshmi Narayan temple, 14 Deities Temple of Rangauti, New Kali temple and Sringeri Sharada Peetham or Tirupati temple. Besides Hinduism, many residents practice Buddhism and Sikhism. Muslims constitute the largest minority with 8.30% of the total population. There are several mosques in the Town near the main bazaar, in Kubjar and in Khowrabil, as well as many maktabs and madrasas in the areas of Kubjar, Baburbazar and Tillabazar. Christianity is a followed by 0.60% of the population.

== Culture ==
Language Chart of Population by percentage
1. Bengali (85.6%)
2. Manipuri (5.12%)
3. Tripuri (2.66%)
4. Others (6.61%)

In Kailashahar, the majority of the population is Bengali, making up 85.61 percent of the total population. In addition, there are a number of tribal populations as well. At present, the culture of Kailashahar is a mixture of Bengali and tribal influences. Kailashahar has diverse groups of tribal communities, including Tripuri, Manipuri, Chakma, Riang, Jamatia, Noatia, and more; 5.12% of the population is Manipuri or Bishnupuri, and 2.66% is Tripuri.

The folk culture of the tribal and non-tribal people of the Town forms the backbone of Kailashahar's cultural tradition. The Town witnesses many traditional folk dances like Dhamail, Hoza Giri, Kirtan etc.

== Festivals ==
As the majority of the population of the Town is Bengali, Durga Puja is one of the major festivals of the Town, which is celebrated every year between the months of September and October. After Durga Puja, Diwali is celebrated throughout the state as well as in Kailashahar around October and November. Asokastami festival is celebrated in the month of February every year, in Kailashahar as well as in the Unkoti hills. Also, Gariya Puja is celebrated for seven days from the seventh day of the month of Baishakh (3rd week of April).

Apart from the mentioned festivals, the Town also celebrate Ganesh Puja, Eid, Muharram and Christmas simultaneously.

== Climate ==
Generally, Kailashahar's climate is similar to that of the rest of the state. The climate in the Town is generally calm and stable, with few influences from seasons other than summer, monsoon, and winter. However, despite this, the climate of this Town is diverse.

The Town has a warm, humid tropical climate with five indistinct seasons: spring, summer, monsoon, autumn, and winter. The spring season begins in late February and lasts until mid-March. Winter returns in mid-February with fresh rain. Mid-March marks the beginning of the summer season, and April–May marks its peak. The pre-monsoon rains always occur in March and April.

Climate data for Kailashahar Airport (1991–2020, extremes 1968–present)
Month	Jan	Feb	Mar	Apr	May	Jun	Jul	Aug	Sep	Oct	Nov	Dec	Year
Record high °C (°F)	31.6 (88.9)	34.5 (94.1)	38.6 (101.5)	42.2 (108.0)	42.0 (107.6)	38.3 (100.9)	37.8 (100.0)	37.5 (99.5)	37.2 (99.0)	36.0 (96.8)	36.8 (98.2)	31.7 (89.1)	42.2 (108.0)
Mean daily maximum °C (°F)	25.7 (78.3)	28.4 (83.1)	32.0 (89.6)	32.6 (90.7)	32.2 (90.0)	32.2 (90.0)	32.4 (90.3)	32.7 (90.9)	32.5 (90.5)	31.8 (89.2)	29.8 (85.6)	26.8 (80.2)	30.8 (87.4)
Mean daily minimum °C (°F)	11.1 (52.0)	13.5 (56.3)	18.1 (64.6)	21.4 (70.5)	23.4 (74.1)	24.9 (76.8)	25.3 (77.5)	25.4 (77.7)	24.8 (76.6)	23.0 (73.4)	17.7 (63.9)	13.1 (55.6)	20.1 (68.2)
Record low °C (°F)	2.4 (36.3)	3.9 (39.0)	7.2 (45.0)	12.1 (53.8)	17.4 (63.3)	19.3 (66.7)	19.7 (67.5)	20.8 (69.4)	20.0 (68.0)	15.4 (59.7)	8.8 (47.8)	5.6 (42.1)	2.4 (36.3)
Average rainfall mm (inches)	6.3 (0.25)	41.1 (1.62)	93.9 (3.70)	270.8 (10.66)	531.8 (20.94)	482.3 (18.99)	389.4 (15.33)	340.9 (13.42)	299.7 (11.80)	161.3 (6.35)	25.9 (1.02)	18.6 (0.73)	2,662 (104.80)
Average rainy days	0.8	2.2	4.6	10.3	17.2	17.8	18.9	18.3	14.8	7.7	1.4	0.8	114.7
Average relative humidity (%) (at 17:30 IST)	72	61	57	69	77	82	83	82	84	84	81	79	76
Source: India Meteorological Department

== Education ==
RKSP (Ram Krishna Shiksha Prathisthan)

Kailasahar has a total of 26 schools, including rural areas, urban areas and panchayats. There are a total of 16 primary and upper primary schools, as well as ten secondary and higher secondary schools. Besides this, there are two colleges and an educational institution. The Town also has many art schools, dance schools, and music schools, most of which are private.

General degree College

- Ramkrishna Mahabhidyalay (associated with Tripura University)

Polytechnic College

- Industrial Trade institute (I.T.I)

Educational Institution

- District Institute of Education and Training, Kailashahar

Schools

- Bhagini Nivedita Girl's Higher Secondary School
- Goldharpur R.S.H.S. School
- Kacharghat High School
- Kendriya Vidyalaya Kailashahar
- Netaji Vidyapith English Medium (H.S) School
- Radha Kishore Institution
- RamKrishna Shiksha Pratishthan
- Sishu Niketan
- Tilabazar H.S School
- Vidyanagar HS School

Nursery

- Children's Garden
- Children's Blossom
- Angel Kidz, Gobindapur, Kailashahar.
- Netaji Shiksha Niketan

== Transport ==
Kailashahar is connected by National Highway 208A to Dharmanagar - Kadamtala - Assam. Next to the Town is the NH 8 terminal, which is one of the two junctions in the state. National Highway 208A starts from this junction and ends at its junction with NH-44 (Old NH-8) near Chankhera in Assam.

A daily bus service runs from Kailashahar to kumarghat (Railway Station) every morning and night, also bus services connect the Town with Guwahati, Silchar, Shillong and Agartala. Paitorbazar motor stand is a vehicle and bus stand. From there, many small vehicles are also available for interstate travel or travel to the nearest cities, like Dharmanagar and kumarghat.There is no railway station present in Kailashahar. The nearest railway station is at Kumarghat, which is 26 km from Kailashahar. Bus, Autorickshaw and other small vehicles ply between Kailashahar and Kumarghat. There is a small airport situated at Kailashahar, Kailashahar airport. Small chartered planes land at the airport. The nearest Airport is at Agartala, which is around 178 km from Kailashahar by road.

== Local attractions ==
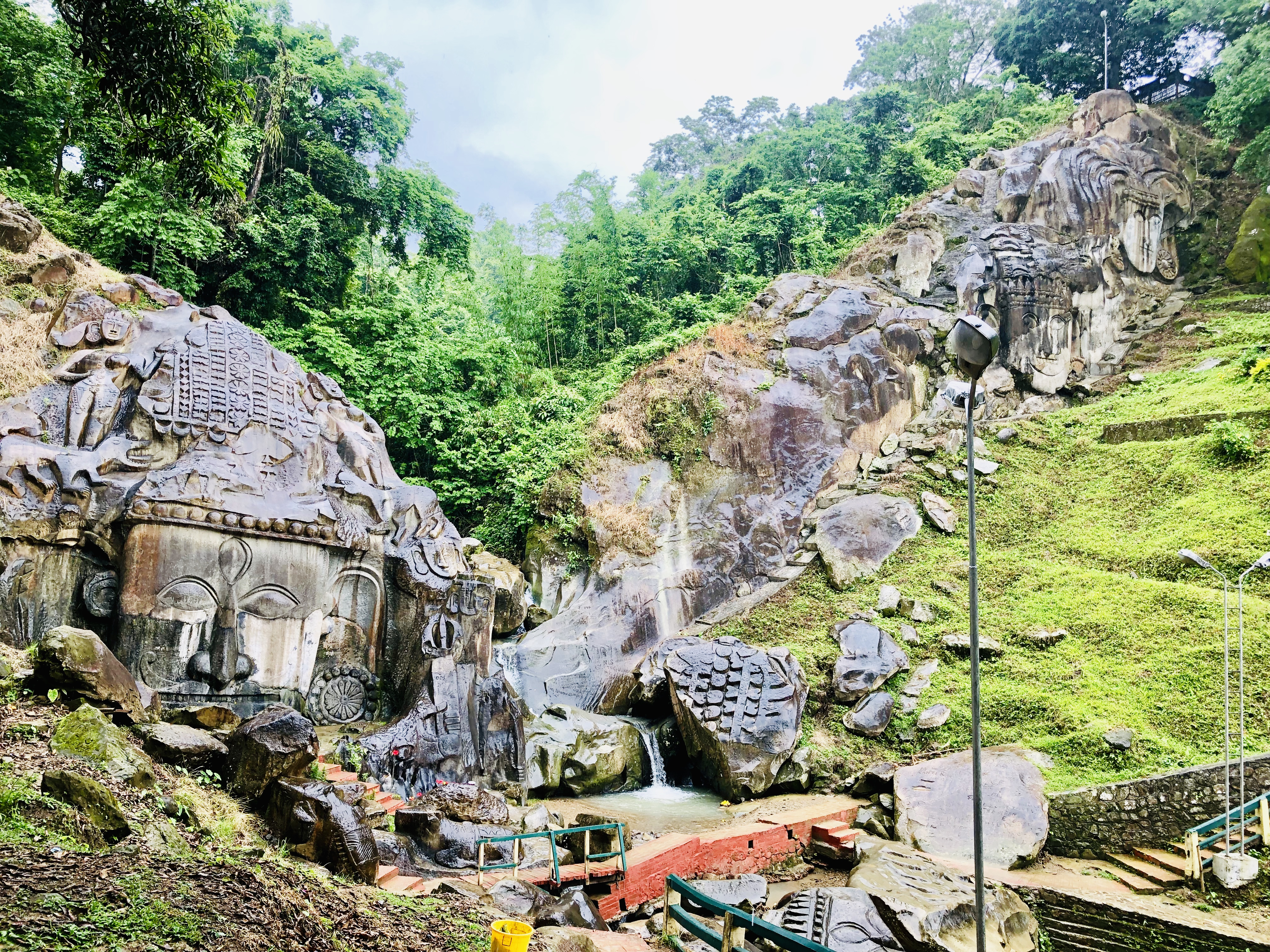
Unakoti rock wall

Lakhi Narayan Bari: Lakhi Narayan Bari is about 45 years old and is counted as an antique monument in India. It is dedicated to Lord Krishna and the idol of the lord was installed by Krishnananda Sevayet.

Tirupati balaji mandir : Tirupati Balaji temple is a Hindu temple situated in bilashpur, Dolugaon, which is 10 km away from the main urban area of Kailashahar.

Tea gardens: A little outside the main town area, Kailashahar has scenic views, tea gardens, parks etc.

Unakoti: The Unakoti hills, or in local language, Subrai Khung is an ancient Shaivite place of worship with huge rock reliefs celebrating Shiva. Here we find one less one crore idols and statues of gods and goddesses carved in stone. It is situated 8 km away from Kailashahar town. Various small vehicles are available from Kailasahar Motorstand to reach Unakoti hill. Next to Unkoti, there is a park called Unkoti Eco Park. This park is a natural area with a great deal of beauty. Unakoti is best visited during the festival of Ashokastami. During this festival, a fair is held at Unakoti, and many peoples and devotees come to participate in this festival.

== Media ==
Various daily newspapers are published from cities like Agartala, Karimganj and Silchar and reach Kailashahar every morning. No daily newspaper is published in Kailashahar except some weekly newspapers. Most of the daily newspapers are Bengali, but there are some Kokborok and English dailies as well. Some of the notable and popular newspapers in Kailashahar include, Anandabazar Patrika, Dainik Sambad, Desher kotha, Aaj kal, Sananda Patrika, Tripura Dorpon, Tripura Times, The Times of India and more. Among digital media, there are few local media channels, broadcast news through local cable networks and social media like Public Now, Headlines Tripura, News Vangaurd, News Icon etc. Along with these, All India Radio and Aakashbani are the main radio networks.

== Governance ==
The legislative assembly of Kailashahar, is one of the constituencies of Tripura state. In 2018, Moboshar Ali was elected as member of the Legislative Assembly from the Town.

Kailashahar Municipal council is the governing body of Kailashahar, responsible for management and governance of the Town.

The District Magistrate and Collector is Dr, Vishal Kumar, IAS. Pradeep Sarkar is the chief executive officer of the Town. The chairperson of Kailashahar Municipal Council is Chapala Debroy and vice-chairperson Nitish Dey.

== See also ==
- List of cities and towns in Tripura
- List of districts of Tripura
- Udaipur
