= Kumarghat =

Kumarghat KGT
- Town
- Location within Tripura Location within India
- Coordinates: 24°9′30″N 92°1′47″E
- Country: India
- State: Tripura
- District: Unakoti district
- Established: 1941

Government
  - Type: Municipal Council
  - Body: Kumarghat Municipal Council
  - Chairman: Biswajit Das (BJP)

Population (2015)
  - Total: 15,189

Languages
  - Official: Bengali, Kokborok, English
- Time zone: UTC+5:30 (IST)
- Postal code: 799264
- Telephone code: 03824
- Vehicle registration: TR-02
- Vidhan Sabha: Pabiacherra
- Website: tripura.gov.in

Kumarghat is a town and subdivision in Unakoti district in Tripura, India. It is a municipal council and the 4th largest town in Tripura. Kumarghat railway station is the only railway station in Unakoti district.

== Demographics ==
As of 2011, Kumarghat sub-division had a population of 157,972.

== Education ==
=== Colleges/Universities ===
- College of Teachers' Education

College of Teacher Education (CTE), Kumarghat is located at Sukantanagar, Kumarghat, about 150 km away from Agartala, the state capital. It is 1.1 km away from NH44 near Kumarghat Police Station and about 500 meters away from Kumarghat Railway Station.

== Transportation ==
Kumarghat railway station is one of the few railway stations in Tripura, which is connected with Agartala and Silchar.

== See also ==
- List of cities and towns in Tripura
