= Sepahijala Wildlife Sanctuary =

Wildlife sanctuary in India

- IUCN category IV (habitat/species management area)
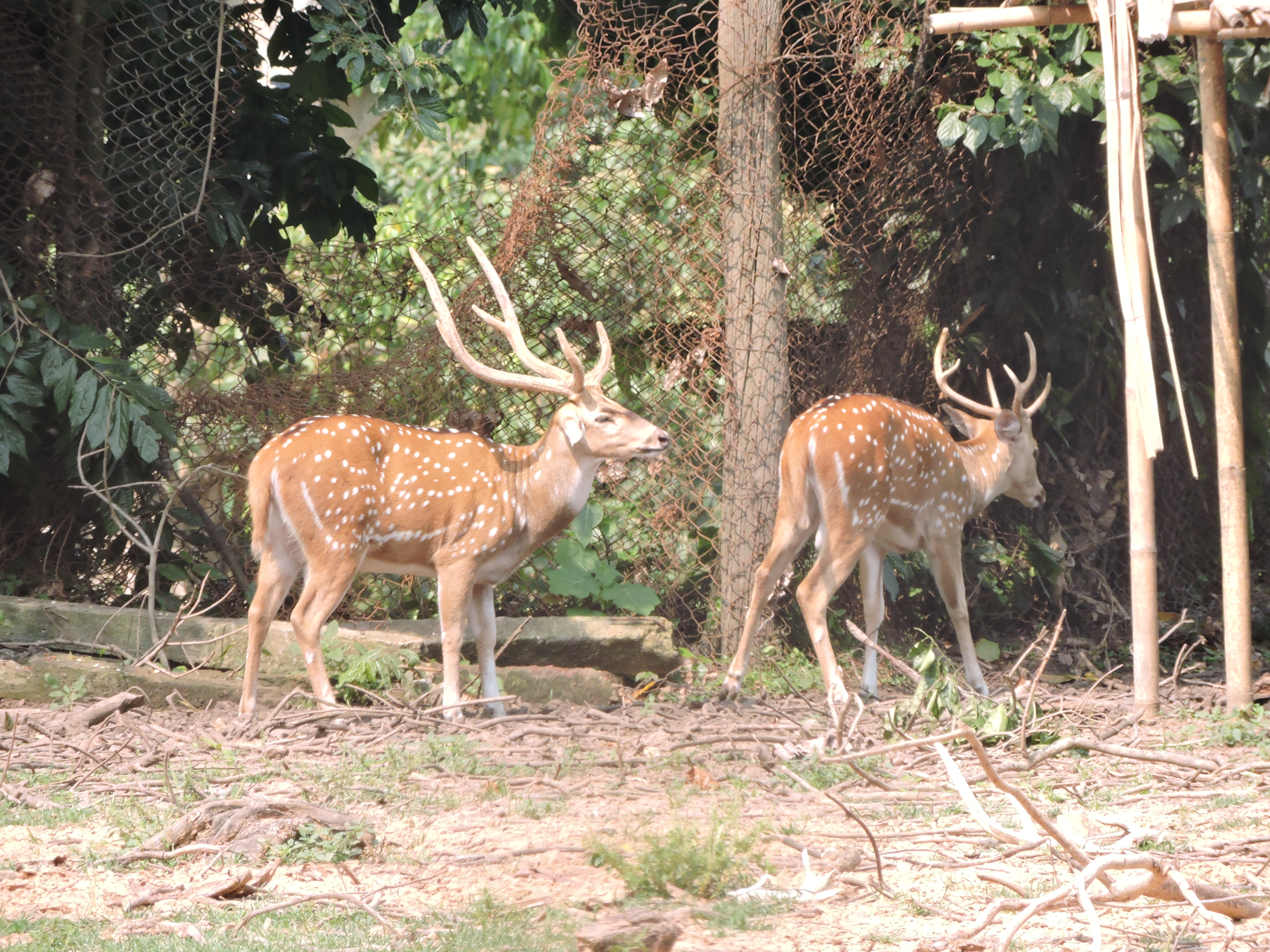
- Chital at the sanctuary

- Location within Tripura Location within India
- Interactive map of Sepahijala Wildlife Sanctuary
- Location: Bishalgarh, West Tripura district
- Nearest city: Agartala
- Coordinates: 23°39′52″N 91°18′42″E
- Area: 18.53 km^{2} (7.15 sq mi)
- Established: 1987

Sepahijala Wildlife Sanctuary is a wildlife sanctuary in the West Tripura district of the Indian state of Tripura.

== History ==
The sanctuary covers and area of 18.53 km^{2} (7.15 sq mi) and was declared a protected area in 1987.

== Wildlife ==
The sanctuary hosts carnivores, primates, ungulates, reptiles and nearly 150 species of birds. The primates include rhesus macaque, pig-tailed macaque, capped langur and dusky langur. The sanctuary has been developed both as a wildlife sanctuary and as an academic and research centre. There are several lakes within the sanctuary and the weather is temperate except for the two humid summer months of March and April.

== See also ==
- Rowa Wildlife Sanctuary
