= Longtharai =

Hill range in Tripura, India

Coordinates: 23.9°N 91.9°E

Longtharai (or, Longtarai) is a hill range in the Indian state of Tripura.
