= Betlingchhip =

Highest peak of the Jampui Hills, India

- Shibraikhong / Thaidawr
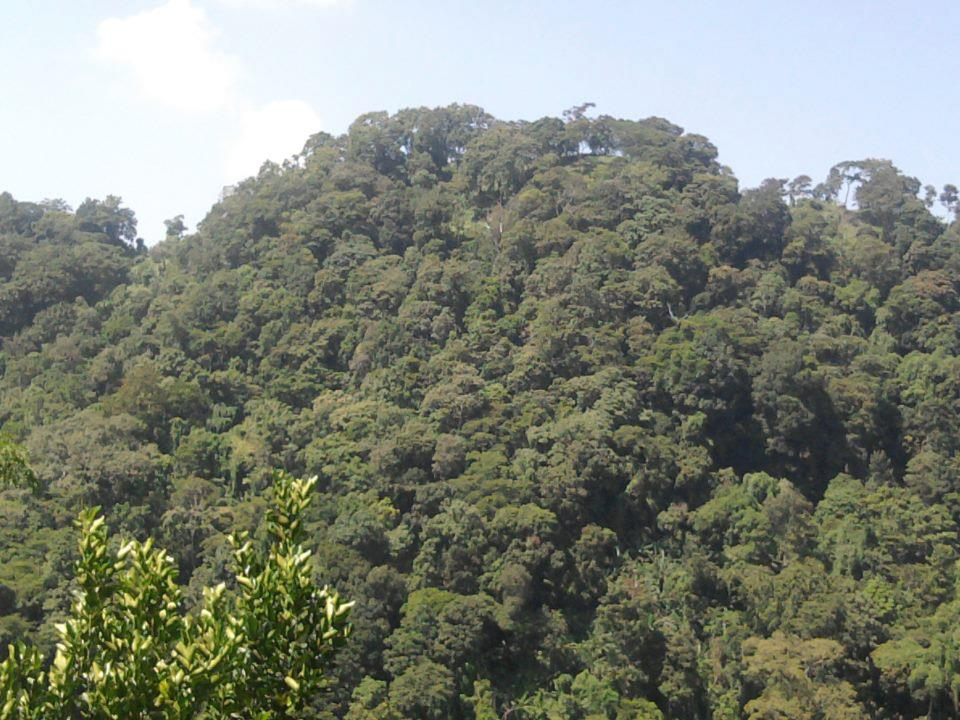
- View of the peak

Highest point
- Elevation: 930 m (3,050 ft)
- Listing: List of Indian states and territories by highest point
- Coordinates: 23°48′35″N 92°15′39″E

Geography
- Location within Tripura
- Location: North Tripura district, Tripura, India
- Parent range: Lushai Hills

Climbing
- Easiest route: Hike / scramble

Betlingchhip, also known as Betalongchhip, Balinchhip and Thaidawr is the highest peak of the Jampui Hills. It is located in the state of Tripura.

== Highest point in Tripura ==
At 930 m Thaidawr peak/Shibraikhong is the highest mountain peak in the state of Tripura. The peak has a good surrounding scenery.

== See also ==
- List of mountains in India
- List of mountains by elevation
