= Pilak, Tripura =

Pilak
- পিলাক
- Location within India
- 23°12′N 91°36′E
- Type: Ancient historic Settlement
- Periods: Historic period 8th to 12th centuries
- Cultures: Hindu and Buddhist
- Satellite of: Samatata kingdom in historical Bengal
- Location: Jolaibari, Tripura, India

Site notes
- Excavation dates: 1927
- Owner: Archaeological Survey of India
- Website: http://www.tripuratourism.gov.in/pilak

Pilak is an archaeological site in the Santirbazar sub-division of South Tripura district of the Indian state of Tripura. Many images and structures, belonging to Buddhist and Hindu sects, have been discovered here since 1927. The antiquities found here are dated to 8th to 12th centuries.

Sandstone sculptures of the Pilak site, which represent a heterodox culture of Hinduism and Buddhism of 9th to 13th century, are on display at the Tripura Government Museum.

== Location ==
Pilak site is located at Jolaibari, in South Tripura, and is spread over an area of about 10 square kilometres (3.9 sq mi). It is 100 kilometres (62 mi) away from Agartala, 51 kilometres (32 mi) from Udaipur, Santibazar is 18 kilometres (11 mi) away, and 3 kilometres (1.9 mi) from Jolaibari. The sites excavated are in Shyam Sundar Tilla, Deb Bari, Thakurani Tilla, Balir Pathar, Basudeb Bari and others.

== History ==
The archaeological site used to be a part of Samatata kingdom in historical Bengal. It is part of a series of archaeological sites that includes Mainamati and Somapura Mahavihara in Bangladesh. The earliest dates of Hindu and Buddhist sculptures, terracotta plaques and seals found at the site are between 8th and 9th centuries. The artifacts unearthed at the site belong to the Bengal's Palas and Guptas sculptural and architectural features; also the style of the Arakan, Myanmar (earlier known as Burma) and indigenous features is noticeable.

The Archaeological Survey of India (ASI) carried out excavations at the site in early 1960s when stupas built with bricks were found. Recent investigations by ASI was at Jolaibārī and other mounds where statues of Buddha and idols of Mahayana Buddhism were unearthed. ASI has taken over the site since 1999 and is responsible for its maintenance. Buddhist tourists from Tibet, Southeast Asia and Japan often visit the place. The Dalai Lama of Mahayana Buddhism visited the site (of the Theravada or Hinayana sect) in 2007.

== Discovery ==
The Pilak archaeological site represents both Hinduism and Buddhism co-existing peacefully. Artifacts of Hinduism are in the form of sculptures and plaques of Hindu gods Shiva, Surya, and Baishnabi. Large number of antiquities pertain to the Hinayana, Mahayana, Vajrayana Buddhism practices. The site is strewn with a large number of terracotta plaques and statues. Very large stone sculptures of Avalokiteśvara and Narasimha have been unearthed at the site.

=== Buddhist antiquities ===
The inscribed terracotta seals found at Pilak depict the Buddhist stupas of very small sizes. In Tripura, it is the seal which is worshipped and not the stupa. There is a cone shaped stone slab with an image of Buddha in an upright posture, dated to 8th century. In a portion of the image only the right arm is seen while the left hand is holding the border of a vestment. An Ushnisha (a three-dimensional oval form) adorns the top of the head which has a "close-curled hair" style, and a very small stupa is also engraved on the left part of the slab. A statue of Avalokiteshvara with two arms found at the site is now exhibited in the Tripura Government Museum.

A sculpture of the 8th-9th century found here is that of Goddess Marichi, venerated by both Mahayana and Vajrayana Buddhists. However, it is now an iconic idol which is installed in a Hindu temple known as Vasudev-badi. The idol in an upright posture is called "Pratyalida" and is mounted on a simple plinth, and is well preserved. The features carved on the idol consist of three faces and six arms; the three right hands depict the "sara, vajra, and parashu" and the three left hands have depictions of ritual symbols of "dhanu, parna-pichichichi and Tarjani mudra".

A sculpted sandstone statue from the site dated to 8th-9th century is of Chunda which is now revered as "Raja Rajeshwari" in a temple at Muhuripur. The image is carved with 18 arms in a posture called "Vajaparyankasana" deified over a "padmapitha" (lotus pedestal). A dharmachakra symbol of Vajrasattva and Ghanathapani decorate its two regular hands. The sculpting on the top part of this slab also includes five Dhyani Buddhas, each depicting the ring of light around its head. A new find from the Sundari Tilla is of a stupa dated to the 11th century similar to architectural features of the rule of "Palas of Bengal".

=== Hinduism antiquities ===
A Hindu religious terracotta image made in fired clay found at Pilak is of Trimurti. Another image found here from the Sagardheba mound is of Surya, the Sun God, riding a chariot driven by seven horses, dated to 7th-9th century, which is deified in a temple in the Rajesvari Ashram in Muhuripur.

== Bibliography ==
- Das, Ratna (1997). Art and Architecture of Tripura. Tribal Research Institute, Government of Tripura.
