= Shakhan =

Hill range in Tripura, India

Coordinates: 23.801°N 92.155°E

Shakhan (or, Sakhan) is a hill range in the Indian state of Tripura.
