= Tripura =

State in northeastern India

- State
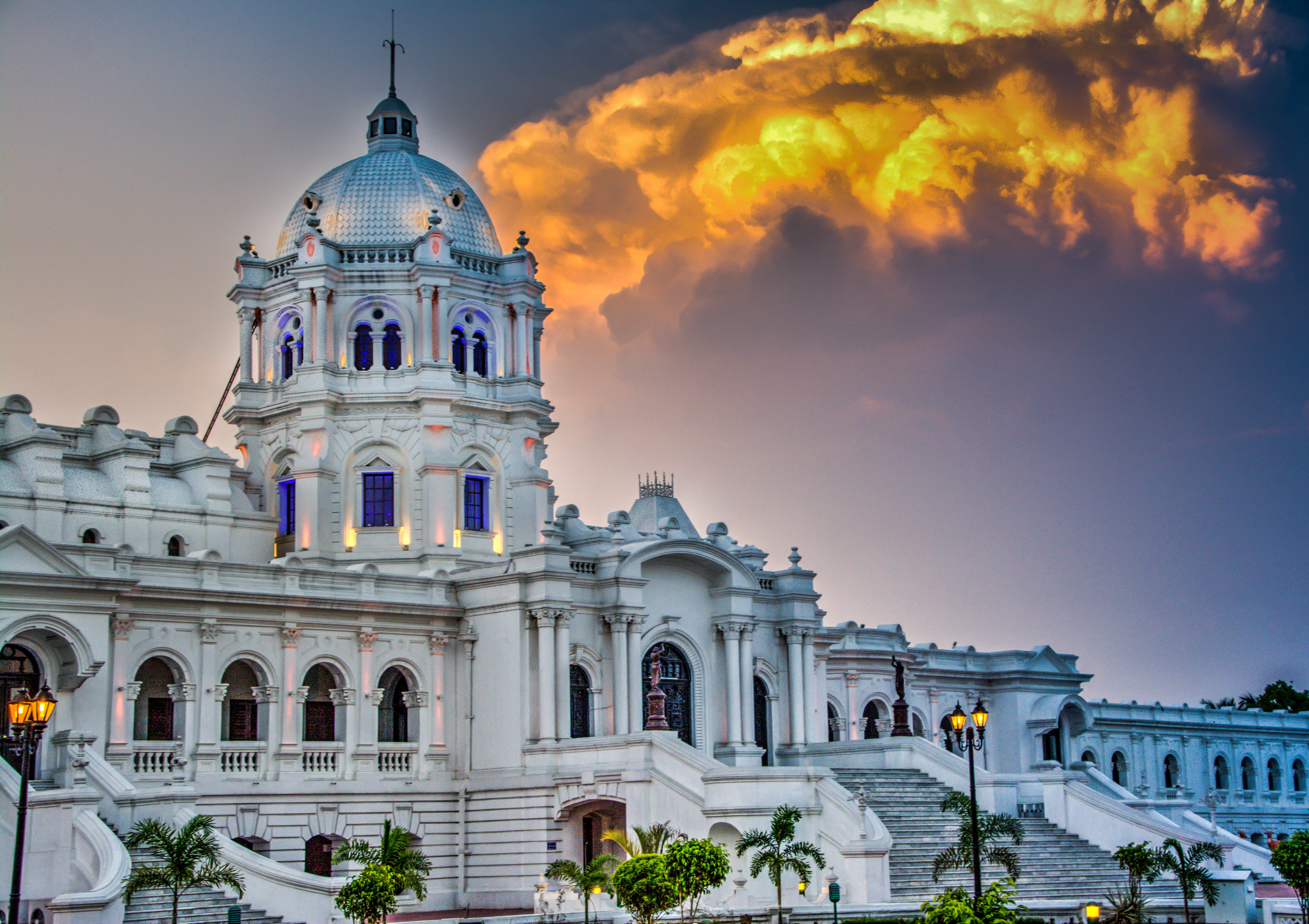
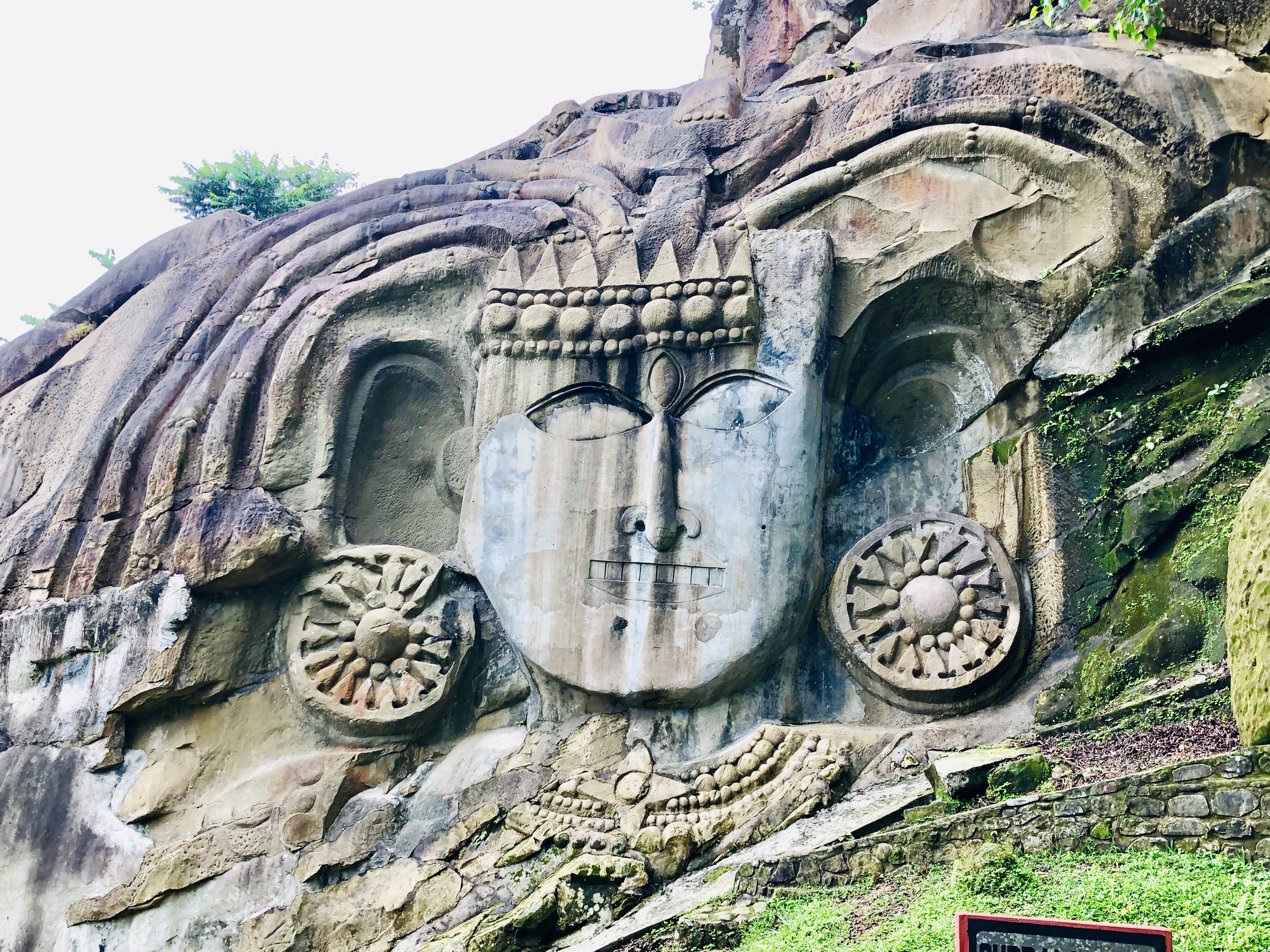
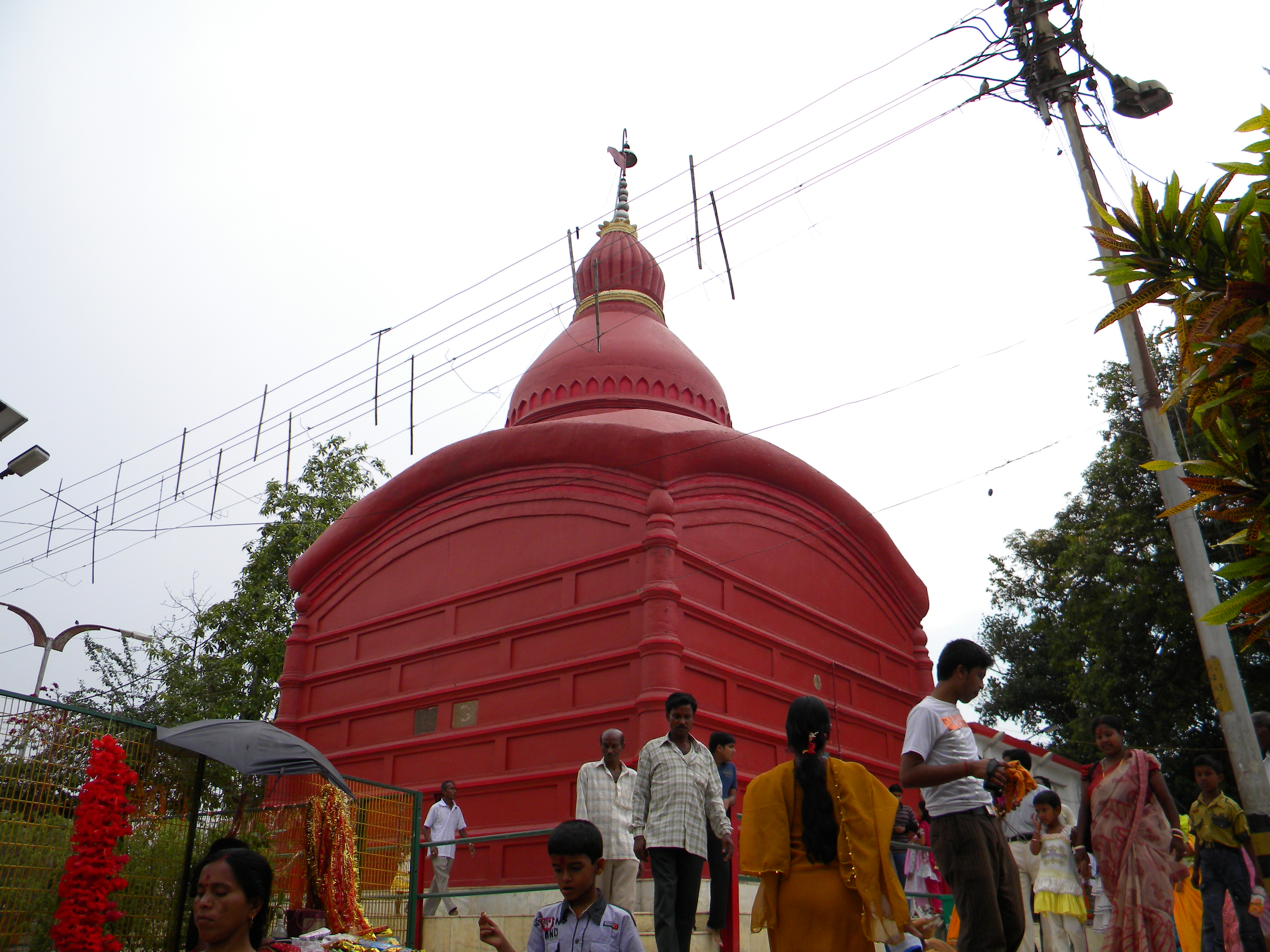
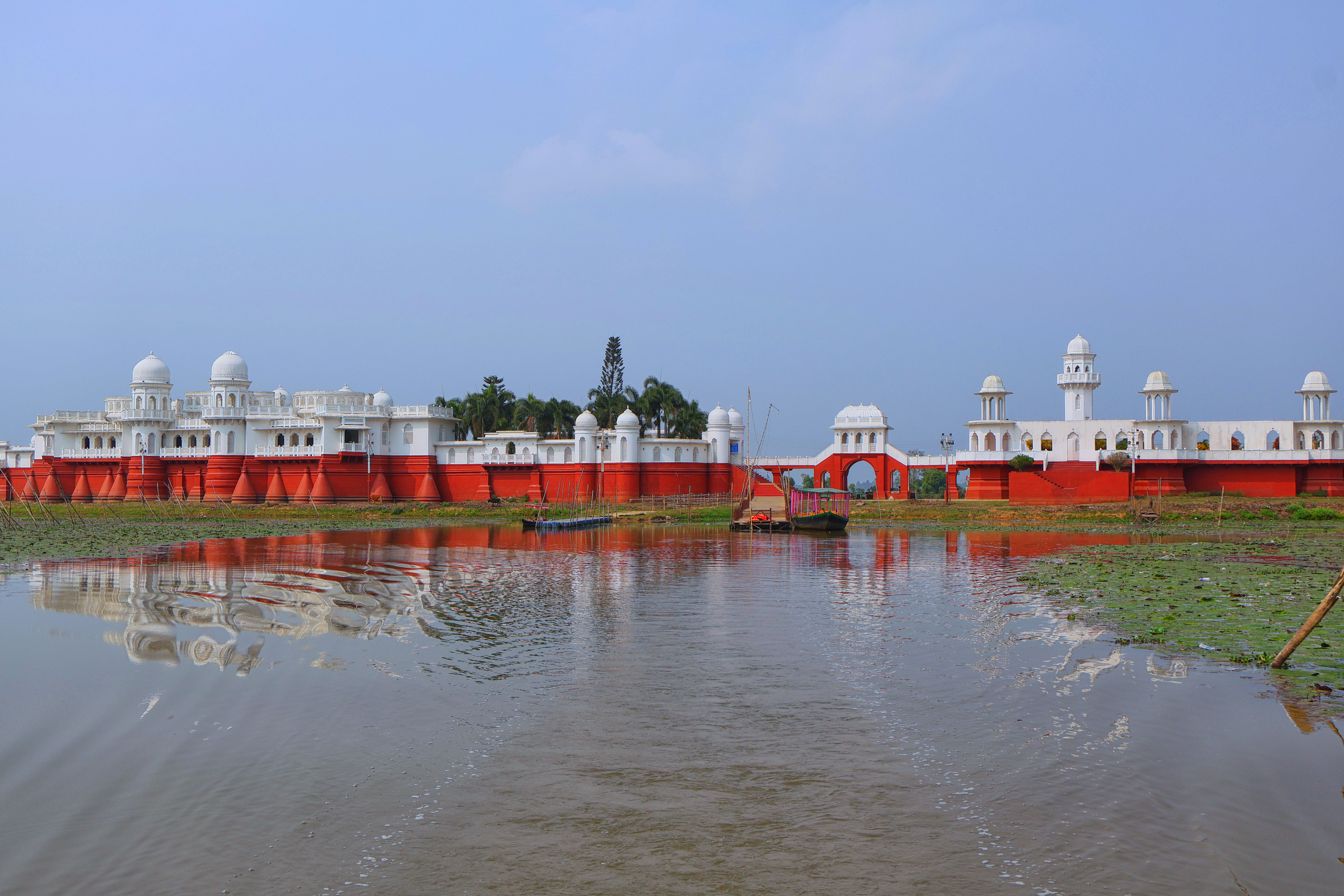
- Ujjayanta Palace Rock-cut sculptures at Unakoti Tripura Sundari Temple Neermahal Water Palace

- Emblem of Tripura
- Etymology: See § Etymology
- Motto(s): Satyameva Jayate (Truth alone triumphs)
- Location of Tripura in India
- Coordinates: 23.84°N 91.28°E
- Country: India
- Region: Northeast India
- Previously was: Princely state of Tripura
- As union territory: 1 November 1956
- As state: 21 January 1972
- Formation: 15 October 1949
- Capital and largest city: Agartala
- Districts: 8

Government
  - Body: Government of Tripura
  - Governor: Indrasena Reddy
  - Chief Minister: Manik Saha (BJP)
  - Chief Secretary: J.K. Sinha

Area
  - Total: 10,491 km^{2} (4,051 sq mi)
  - Rank: 28th

Dimensions
  - Length: 178 km (111 mi)
  - Width: 131 km (81 mi)
- Highest elevation (Betlingchhip): 930 m (3,050 ft)
- Lowest elevation (Gumti River): 15 m (49 ft)

Population (2025)
  - Total: ▲4,222,000
  - Rank: 23rd
  - Density: 402/km^{2} (1,040/sq mi)
  - Urban: 41.45%
  - Rural: 58.85%
- Demonym: Tripuri

Language
  - Official: Bengali; English; Kokborok
  - Official script: Bengali–Assamese script; Latin script

GDP
  - Total (2026–2027): ▲₹33,668 crore (US$3.6 billion) (nominal) ▲ ~US$16.5 billion (PPP)
  - Rank: 24th
  - Per capita: ▲₹213,376 (US$2,300) (nominal) (2024–25) ▲ ~US$10,500 (PPP) (21st)
- Time zone: UTC+05:30 (IST)
- ISO 3166 code: IN-TR
- Vehicle registration: TR
- HDI (2023): ▲0.664 medium (29th)
- Literacy (2025): 95.6% (3rd)
- Sex ratio (2025): 974♀/1000 ♂ (2nd)
- Website: tripura.gov.in
- Symbols of Tripura
- Foundation day: 21 January
- Bird: Green imperial pigeon
- Fish: Butter catfish
- Flower: Indian rose chestnut
- Fruit: Queen pineapple
- Mammal: Phayre's leaf monkey
- Tree: Agarwood
- State highway mark
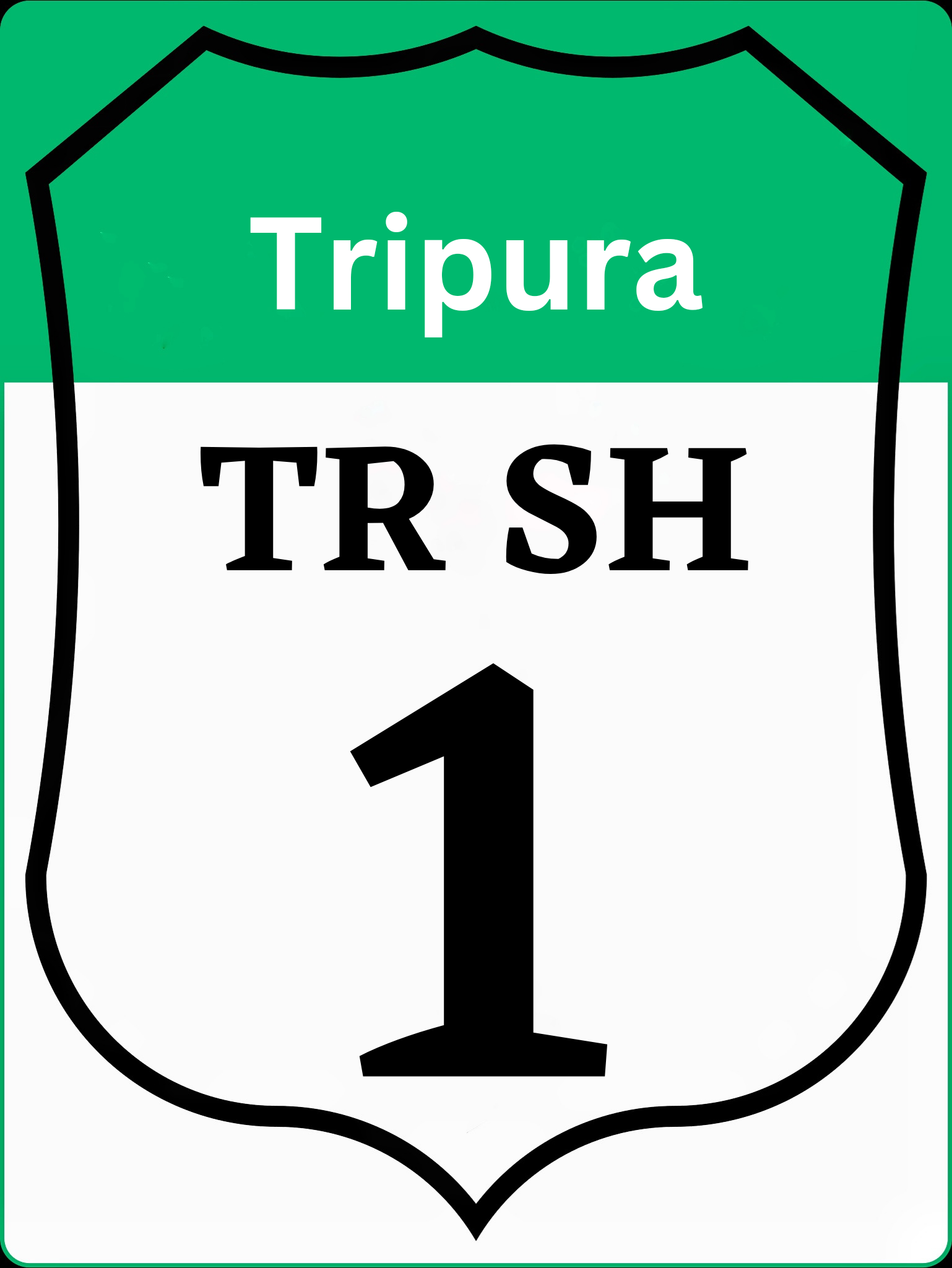
- State highway of Tripura
- List of Indian state symbols
- ^{†}It was elevated from the status of Union territory by the North-Eastern Areas (Reorganisation) Act 1971.

Tripura (/ˈtrɪpʊrə, -ərə/) is a state in northeastern India. The third-smallest state in the country, it covers 10,491 km^{2} (4,051 sq mi); and the seventh-least populous state with a population of 3.67 million. It is bordered by Assam and Mizoram to the east, and by Bangladesh to the north, south and west. Tripura is divided into eight districts and 23 sub-divisions, where Agartala is the capital and the largest city in the state. Tripura has 19 different tribal communities with a majority Bengali population. Bengali, Kokborok, and English are the state's official languages.

The area of modern Tripura — ruled for several centuries by the Manikya Dynasty — was part of the Tripuri Kingdom (also known as Hill Tippera). It became a princely state under the British Raj during its tenure, and acceded to independent India in 1947. It merged with India in 1949 and was designated as a 'Part C State' (union territory). It became a full-fledged state of India in 1972.

Tripura lies in a geographically isolated location in India, as only one major highway, National Highway 8, connects it with the rest of the country. Five mountain ranges — Hathai Kotor (Baramura), Atharamura, Longtharai, Shakhan and Jampui Hills — run north to south, with intervening valleys; Agartala, the capital, is located on a plain to the west. The state has a tropical savanna climate, and receives seasonal heavy rains from the south west monsoon.

Forests cover more than half of the area, in which bamboo and cane tracts are common. Tripura has the highest number of primate species found in any Indian state. Due to its geographical isolation, economic progress in the state is hindered. Poverty and unemployment continue to plague Tripura, which has a limited infrastructure. Most residents are involved in agriculture and allied activities, although the service sector is the largest contributor to the state's gross domestic product.

According to the 2011 census, Tripura is one of the most literate states in India, with a literacy rate of 87.75%. Mainstream Indian cultural elements coexist with traditional practices of the ethnic groups, such as various dances to celebrate religious occasions, weddings and festivities; the use of locally crafted musical instruments and clothes; and the worship of regional deities. The sculptures at the archaeological sites Unakoti, Pilak and Devtamura provide historical evidence of artistic fusion between organised and indigenous religions.

== Etymology ==
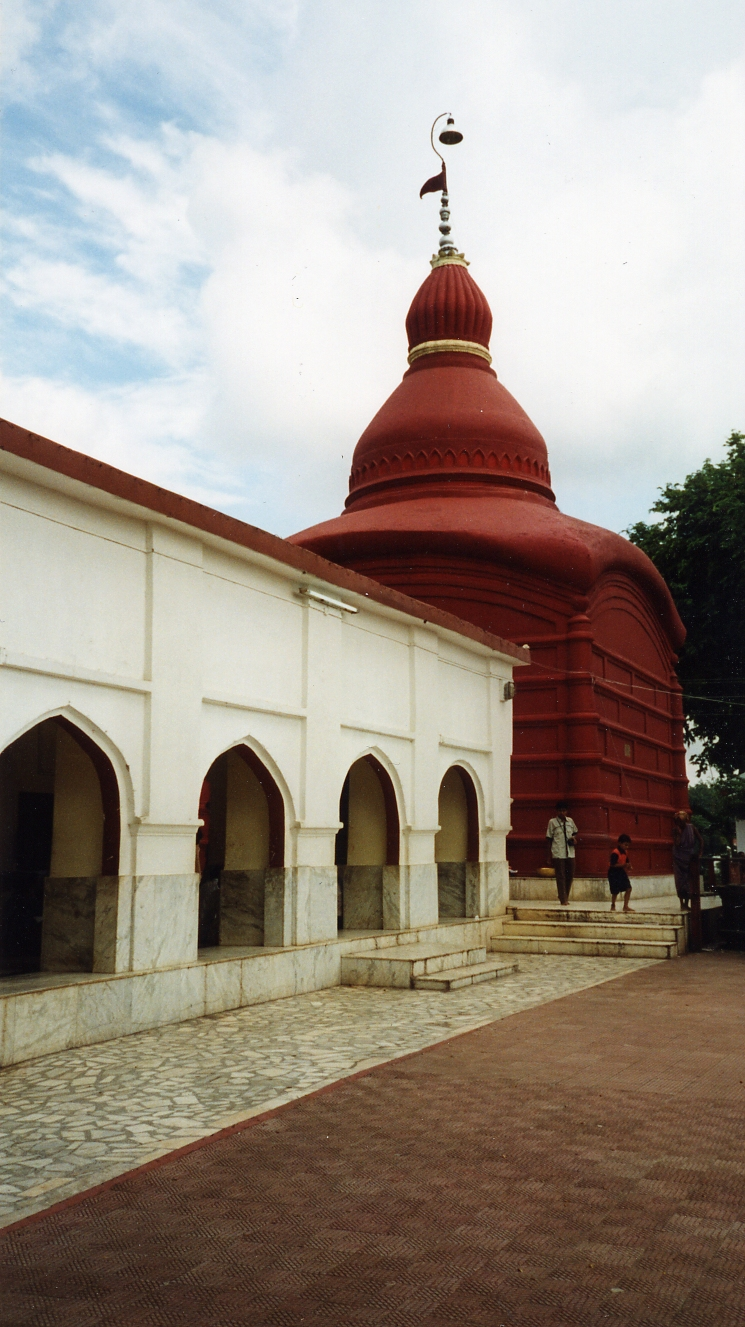
Tripura Sundari Temple in Udaipur

The name Tripura is linked to the Hindu goddess Tripura Sundari, the presiding deity of the Tripura Sundari Temple at Udaipur, one of the 51 Shakta pithas (pilgrimage centres of Shaktism), and to the legendary tyrant king Tripur, who reigned in the region. Tripur was the 39th descendant of Druhyu, who belonged to the lineage of Yayati, a king of the Lunar Dynasty.

There are alternative theories regarding the origin of the name Tripura, such as a possible etymological reinterpretation to Sanskrit of a Tibeto-Burman (Kokborok) name. Variants of the name include Tipra, Tuipura and Tippera, which can all denote the indigenous people inhabiting the area. A Kokborok etymology from tüi (water) and pra (near) has been suggested; the boundaries of Tripura extended to the Bay of Bengal when the kings of the Tipra Kingdom held sway from the Garo Hills of Meghalaya to Arakan, the present Rakhine State of Burma; so the name may reflect vicinity to the sea.

== History ==
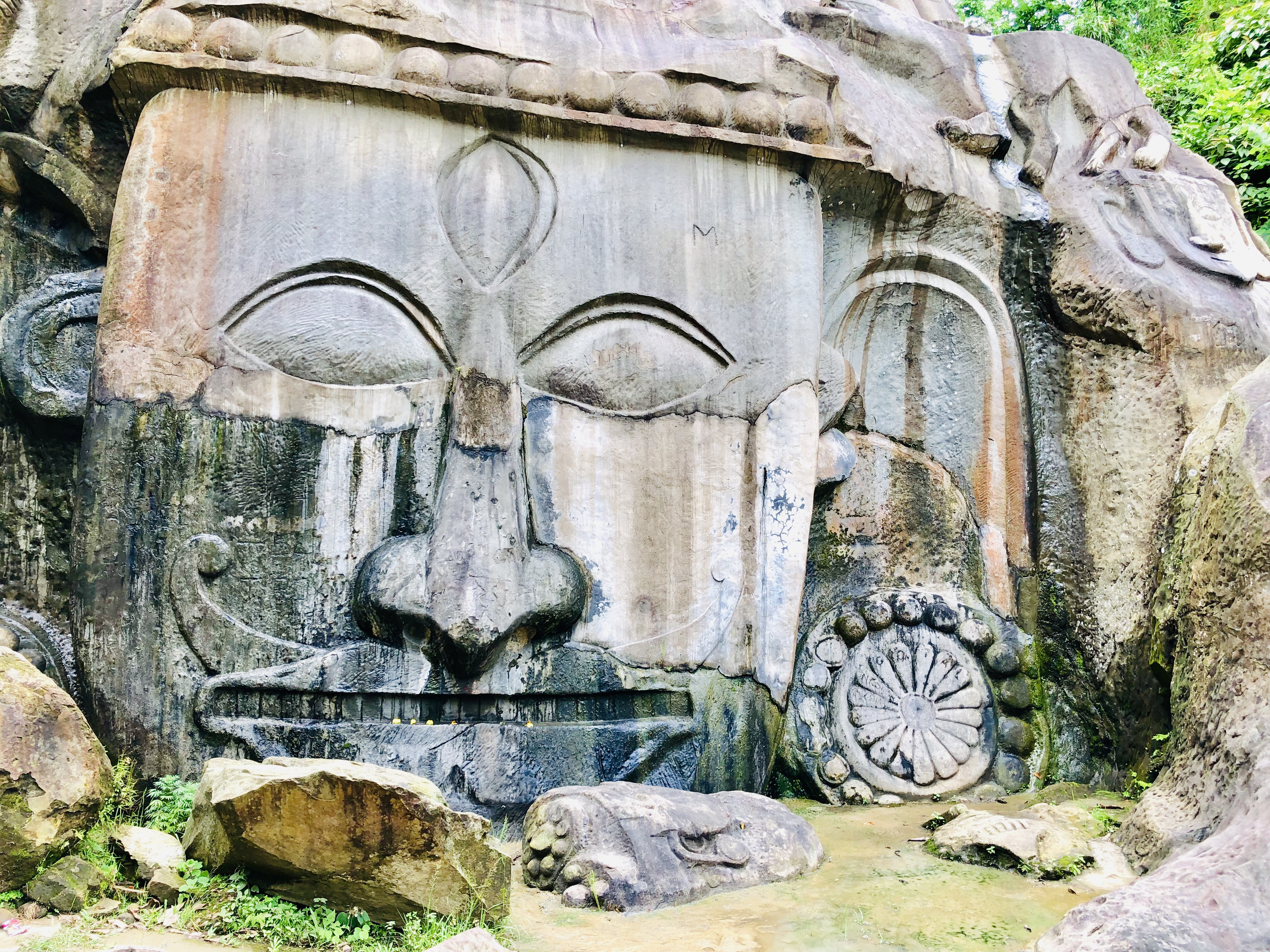
Rock-cut sculpture of Shiva at Unakoti

Although there is no evidence of Lower Paleolithic or Middle Paleolithic settlements in Tripura, Upper Paleolithic tools made of fossilised wood have been found in the Haora and Khowai valleys. The Indian epic, the Mahabharata; ancient religious texts, the Puranas; and the Edicts of Ashoka – stone pillar inscriptions of the Mauryan emperor Ashoka dating from the third century BC – all mention Tripura. An ancient name of Tripura (as mentioned in the Mahabharata) is Kirat Desh (English: "The land of Kirat"), probably referring to the Kirata Kingdoms or the more generic term Kirata. However, it is unclear whether the extent of modern Tripura is coterminous with Kirat Desh. The region was under the rule of the Twipra Kingdom for centuries, but when this dynasty began is not documented. The Rajmala, a chronicle of Tripuri kings which was first written in the 15th century, provides a list of 179 kings, from antiquity up to Krishna Kishore Manikya (1830–1850), but it is not a reliable source.

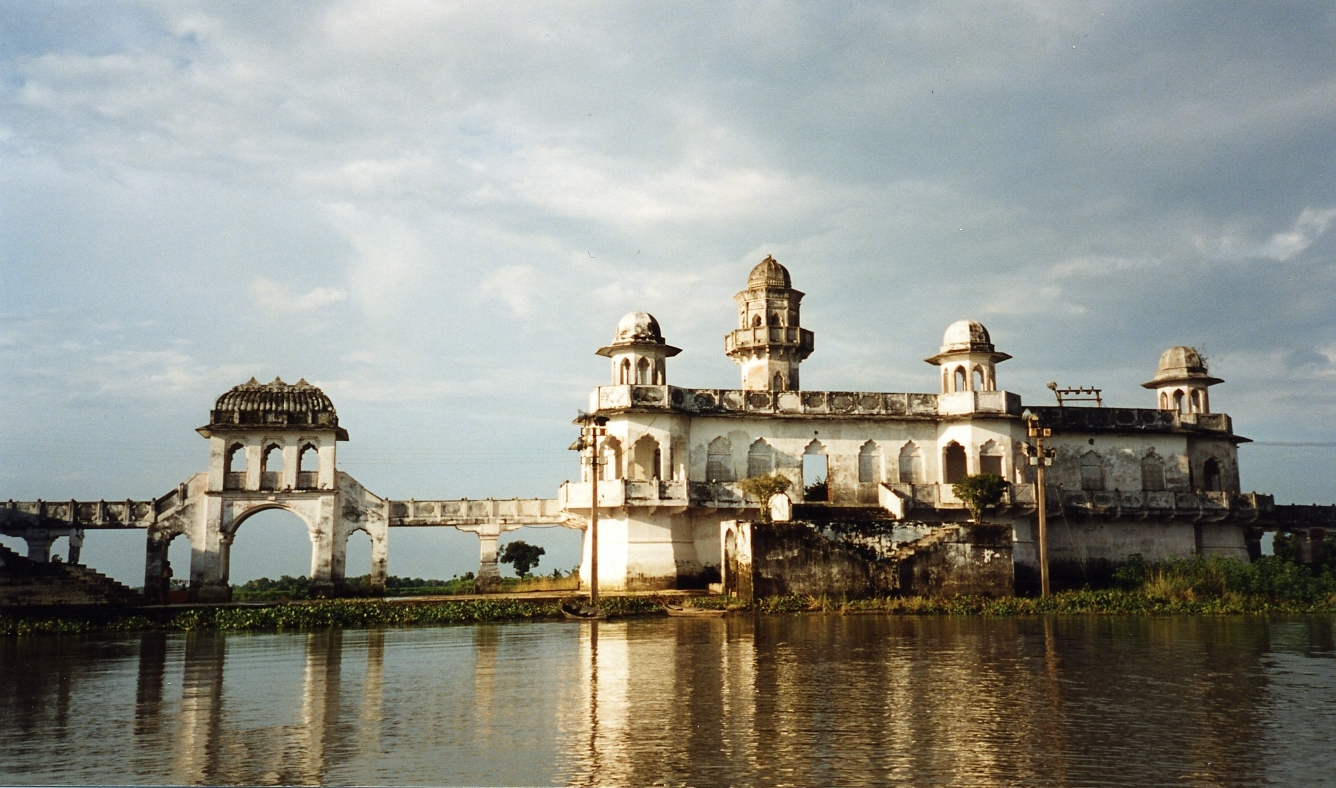
Neermahal Palace is the royal palace built by Bir Bikram Kishore Debbarman of the Kingdom of Tripura.

The boundaries of the kingdom changed over the centuries. At various times, the borders reached south to the jungles of the Sundarbans on the Bay of Bengal; east to Burma; and north to the boundary of the Kamarupa kingdom in Assam. There were several Muslim invasions of the region from the 13th century onward, which culminated in Mughal dominance of the plains of the kingdom in 1733, although their rule never extended to the hill regions. The Mughals had influence over the appointment of the Tripuri kings.

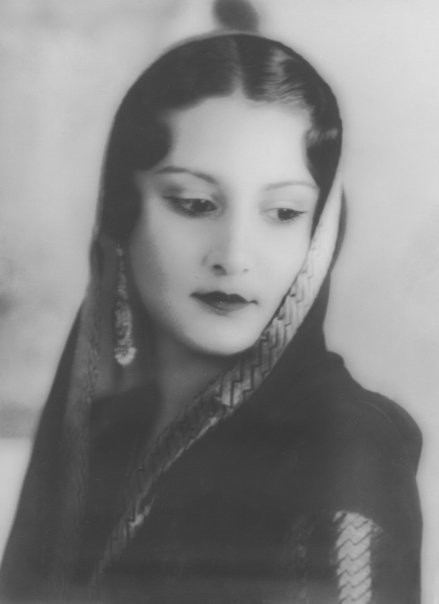
Queen Kanchan Prabha Devi who signed the instrument of accession to India as president of the Council of Regency

Tripura became a princely state during British rule in India. The kings had an estate in British India, known as Tippera district or Chakla Roshanbad (now the Comilla district of Bangladesh), in addition to the independent area known as Hill Tippera, roughly corresponding to the present-day Tripura state. Udaipur, in the south of Tripura, was the capital of the kingdom, until the king Krishna Manikya moved the capital to Old Agartala in the 18th century. It was moved to the new city of Agartala in the 19th century. Bir Chandra Manikya (1862–1896) modelled his administration on the pattern of British India, and enacted reforms including the formation of Agartala Municipal Corporation.

=== Post-independence (1947–present) ===
Following the independence of India in 1947, Tippera district – the estate in the plains of British India – became Comilla district of East Pakistan, and Hill Tippera remained under a regency council until 1949. The Maharani Regent of Tripura signed the Tripura Merger Agreement on 9 September 1949, making Tripura a Part C state of India. It became a Union Territory, without a legislature, in November 1956 and an elected ministry was installed in July 1963. Full statehood was conferred in 1971 by the North-Eastern Areas (Reorganisation) Act, 1971. The geographic partition that coincided with the independence of India resulted in major economic and infrastructural setbacks for the state, as road transport between the state and the major cities of the newly independent India had to follow a more circuitous route, around East Pakistan. The road distance between Kolkata and Agartala before the partition was less than 350 km (220 mi), and increased to 1,700 km (1,100 mi), as the route now avoided East Pakistan. The geopolitical isolation was aggravated by an absence of rail transport.

After the partition of India, many Bengali Hindus migrated to Tripura as refugees fleeing religious persecution in Muslim-majority East Pakistan, especially after 1949. Settlement by Hindu Bengalis increased during the Bangladesh Liberation War of 1971. Parts of the state were shelled by the Pakistan Army during the Indo-Pakistani War of 1971. Following the war, the Indian government reorganised the North East region to ensure effective control of the international borders – three new states came into existence on 21 January 1972: Meghalaya, Manipur, and Tripura. Before Tripura's merger with the Union of India, the majority of the population was composed of Tripuri people. Ethnic strife between the indigenous Tripuris and the predominantly immigrant Bengali community led to scattered violence, and an insurgency spanning decades, including occasional massacres such as the 1980 Mandai massacre. This gradually abated following the establishment of a tribal autonomous district council and the use of strategic counter-insurgency operations. Tripura remains peaceful, as of 2016. In retaliation for the communal violence against the Hindu minority in neighbouring Bangladesh, mosques in several areas in Tripura were attacked from 19 to 26 October 2021. The influx of refugees from erstwhile East Pakistan and present day Bangladesh has led to the minoritisation of the indigenous peoples of Tripura.

== Geography ==
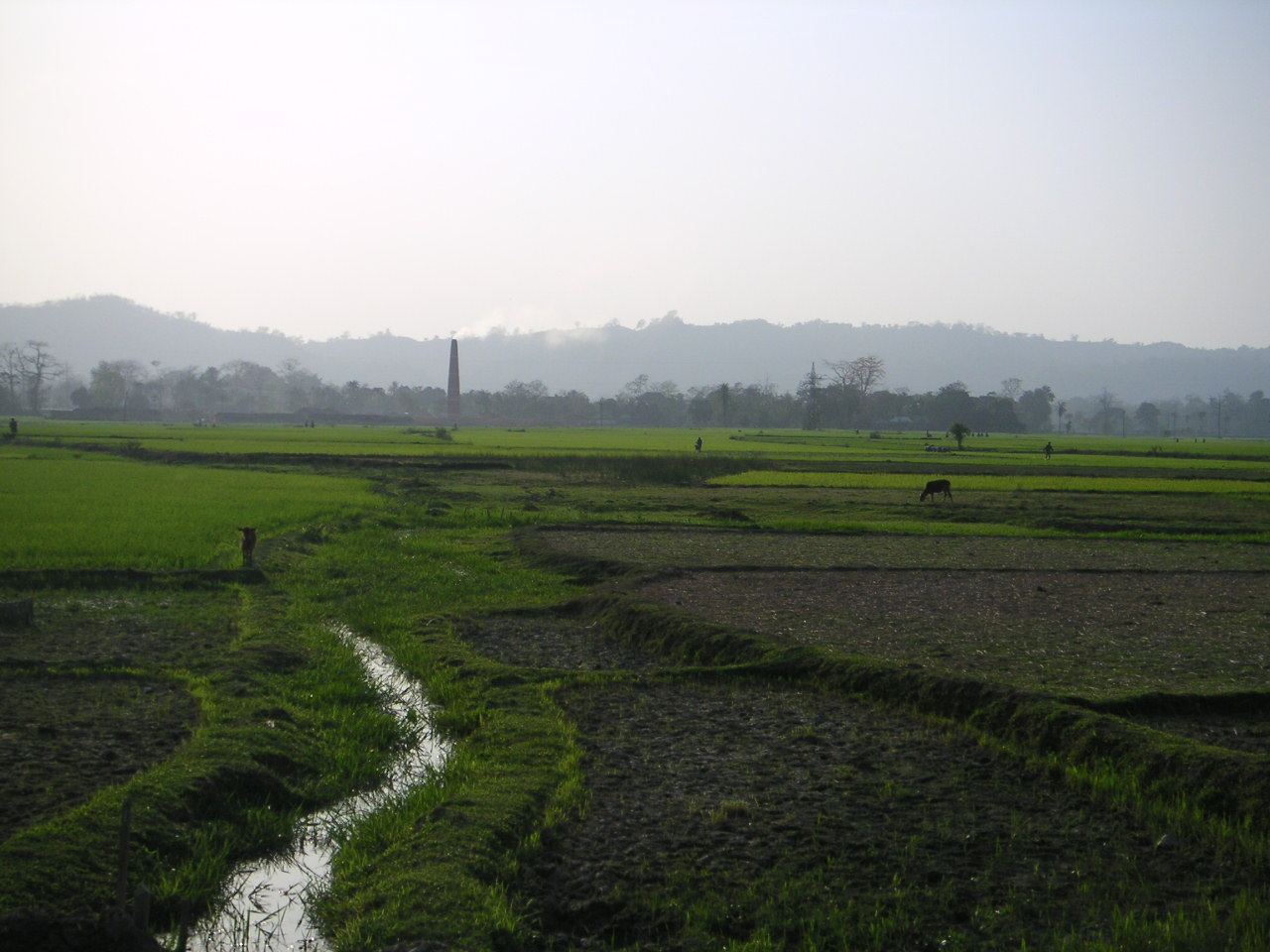
Rice is grown on Tripura's alluvial plains, which include lungas, the narrow valleys that are found mainly in the west of the state.

Tripura is a landlocked state in North East India, where the seven contiguous states – Arunachal Pradesh, Assam, Manipur, Meghalaya, Mizoram, Nagaland and Tripura – are collectively known as the Seven Sister States. Spread over 10,491.69 km^{2} (4,050.86 sq mi), Tripura is the third-smallest among the 28 states in the country, behind Goa and Sikkim. It extends from 22°56'N to 24°32'N, and 91°09'E to 92°20'E. Its maximum extent measures about 178 km (111 mi) from north to south, and 131 km (81 mi) east to west. Tripura is bordered by the country of Bangladesh to the west, north and south; and the Indian states of Assam to the north east; and Mizoram to the east. It is accessible by national highways passing through the Karimganj district of Assam and Mamit district of Mizoram.

=== Topography ===
The physiography is characterised by hill ranges, valleys and plains. The state has five anticlinal ranges of hills running north to south, from Baramura in the west, through Atharamura, Longtharai and Shakhan, to the Jampui Hills in the east. The intervening synclines are the Agartala–Udaipur, Khowai–Teliamura, Kamalpur–Ambasa, Kailasahar–Manu and Dharmanagar–Kanchanpur valleys. At an altitude of 939 m (3,081 ft), Betling Shib in the Jampui range is the state's highest point. The small isolated hillocks interspersed throughout the state are known as tillas, and the narrow fertile alluvial valleys, mostly present in the west, are called Doóng/lungas. A number of rivers originate in the hills of Tripura and flow into Bangladesh. The Khowai, Dhalai, Manu, Juri and Longai flow towards the north; Sumli to the north west; the Bijoy; Gumti and Haora towards the west; and the Muhuri and Feni to the south west.

The lithostratigraphy data published by the Geological Survey of India dates the rocks, on the geologic time scale, between the Oligocene epoch, approximately 34 to 23 million years ago, and the Holocene epoch, which started 12,000 years ago. The hills have red laterite soil that is porous. The flood plains and narrow valleys are overlain by alluvial soil, and those in the west and south constitute most of the agricultural land. According to the Bureau of Indian Standards, on a scale ranging from I to V in order of increasing susceptibility to earthquakes, the state lies in seismic zone V.

=== Climate ===
The state has a tropical savanna climate, designated Aw under the Köppen climate classification. The undulating topography leads to local variations, particularly in the hill ranges. The four main seasons are winter, from December to February; pre-monsoon or summer, from March to April; monsoon, from May to September; and post-monsoon, from October to November. During the monsoon season, the south west monsoon brings heavy rains, which cause frequent floods. The average annual rainfall between 1995 and 2006 ranged from 1,979.6 to 2,745.9 mm (77.94 to 108.11 in). During winter, temperatures range from 13 to 27 °C (55 to 81 °F), while in the summer they fall between 24 and 36 °C (75 and 97 °F). According to a United Nations Development Programme report, the state lies in "very high damage risk" zone from wind and cyclones.

Climate data for Agartala, the capital of Tripura
| Month | Jan | Feb | Mar | Apr | May | Jun | Jul | Aug | Sep | Oct | Nov | Dec | Year |
|---|---|---|---|---|---|---|---|---|---|---|---|---|---|
| Mean daily maximum °C (°F) | 25.6 (78.1) | 28.3 (82.9) | 32.5 (90.5) | 33.7 (92.7) | 32.8 (91.0) | 31.8 (89.2) | 31.4 (88.5) | 31.7 (89.1) | 31.7 (89.1) | 31.1 (88.0) | 29.2 (84.6) | 26.4 (79.5) | 30.5 (86.9) |
| Mean daily minimum °C (°F) | 10 (50) | 13.2 (55.8) | 18.7 (65.7) | 22.2 (72.0) | 23.5 (74.3) | 24.6 (76.3) | 24.8 (76.6) | 24.7 (76.5) | 24.3 (75.7) | 22 (72) | 16.6 (61.9) | 11.3 (52.3) | 19.7 (67.4) |
| Average precipitation mm (inches) | 27.5 (1.08) | 21.5 (0.85) | 60.7 (2.39) | 199.7 (7.86) | 329.9 (12.99) | 393.4 (15.49) | 363.1 (14.30) | 298.7 (11.76) | 232.4 (9.15) | 162.5 (6.40) | 46 (1.8) | 10.6 (0.42) | 2,146 (84.49) |

=== Flora and fauna ===
State symbols of Tripura
| State animal | Phayre's leaf monkey |
| State bird | Green imperial pigeon |
| State tree | Agarwood |
| State flower | Mesua ferrea |
| State fruit | Queen pineapple |

Like most of the Indian subcontinent, Tripura lies within the Indomalayan realm. According to the Biogeographic classification of India, the state is in the "North-East" biogeographic zone. In 2011 forests covered 57.73% of the state. Tripura hosts three different types of ecosystems: mountain, forest and freshwater. The evergreen forests on the hill slopes and the sandy river banks are dominated by species such as Dipterocarpus, Artocarpus, Amoora, Elaeocarpus, Syzygium and Eugenia. Two types of moist deciduous forests comprise the majority of the vegetation: moist deciduous mixed forest and Sal (Shorea robusta)-predominant forest. The interspersion of bamboo and cane forests with deciduous and evergreen flora is a peculiarity of Tripura's vegetation. Grasslands and swamps are also present, particularly in the plains. Herbaceous plants, shrubs, and trees such as Albizia, Barringtonia, Lagerstroemia and Macaranga flourish in the swamps of Tripura. Shrubs and grasses include Schumannianthus dichotoma (shitalpati), Phragmites and Saccharum (sugarcane).

According to a survey in 1989–90, Tripura hosts 90 land mammal species from 65 genera and 10 orders, including such species as elephant (Elephas maximus), bear (Melursus ursinus), binturong (Arctictis binturong), wild dog (Cuon alpinus), porcupine (Artherurus assamensis), barking deer (Muntiacus muntjak), sambar (Cervus unicolor), wild boar (Sus scrofa), gaur (Bos gaurus), leopard (Panthera pardus), clouded leopard (Neofelis nebulosa), and many species of small cats and primates. Out of 15 free ranging primates of India, seven are found in Tripura; this is the highest number of primate species found in any Indian state. The wild buffalo (Bubalus arnee) is extinct now. There are nearly 300 species of birds in the state.

Wildlife sanctuaries of the state are Sipahijola, Gumti, Rowa and Trishna wildlife sanctuaries. National parks of the state are Clouded Leopard National Park and Rajbari National Park. These protected areas cover a total of 566.93 km^{2} (218.89 sq mi). Gumti is also an Important Bird Area. In winter, thousands of migratory waterfowl throng Gumti and Rudrasagar lakes.

== Administrative divisions ==
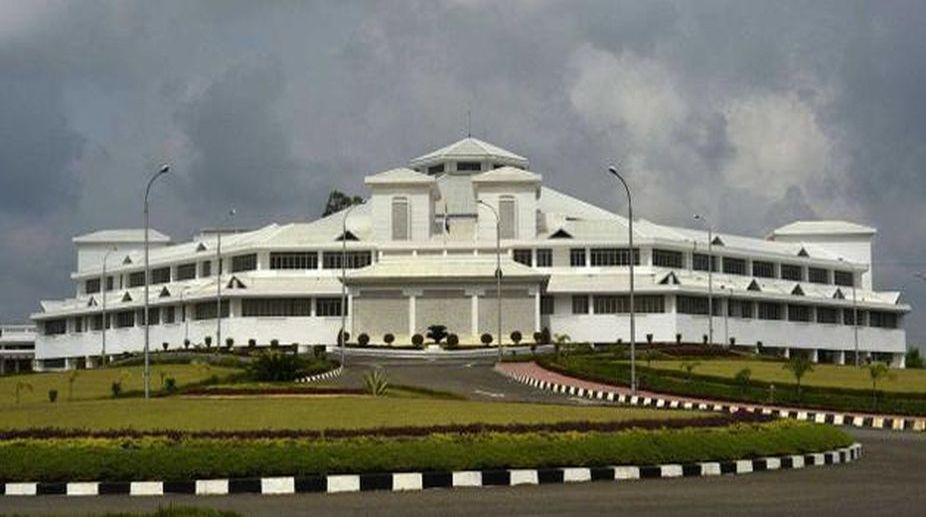
Tripura Assembly

Tripura district map

In January 2012, major changes were implemented in the administrative divisions of Tripura. There had previously been four districts – Dhalai (headquarters Ambassa), North Tripura (headquarters Kailashahar), South Tripura (headquarters Udaipur, Tripura), and West Tripura (headquarters Agartala). Four new districts were carved out of the existing four in January 2012 – Khowai, Unakoti, Sipahijala and Gomati. Six new subdivisions and five new blocks were also added. Each district is administered by a district collector and district magistrate, usually appointed from the Indian Administrative Service cadre. The subdivisions of each district are administered by a sub-divisional magistrate and each subdivision is further divided into blocks. The blocks consist of Panchayats (village councils) and town municipalities. As of 2012, the state had eight districts, 23 subdivisions and 58 development blocks. National census and state statistical reports are not available for all the new administrative divisions, as of March 2013. Agartala, the capital of Tripura, is the most populous city. Other major towns with a population of 10,000 or more (as per 2015 census) are Sabroom, Dharmanagar, Jogendranagar, Kailashahar, Pratapgarh, Udaipur, Amarpur, Belonia, Gandhigram, Kumarghat, Khowai, Ranirbazar, Sonamura, Bishalgarh, Teliamura, Mohanpur, Melaghar, Ambassa, Kamalpur, Bishramganj, Kathaliya, Santirbazar and Baxanagar.

== Government and politics ==
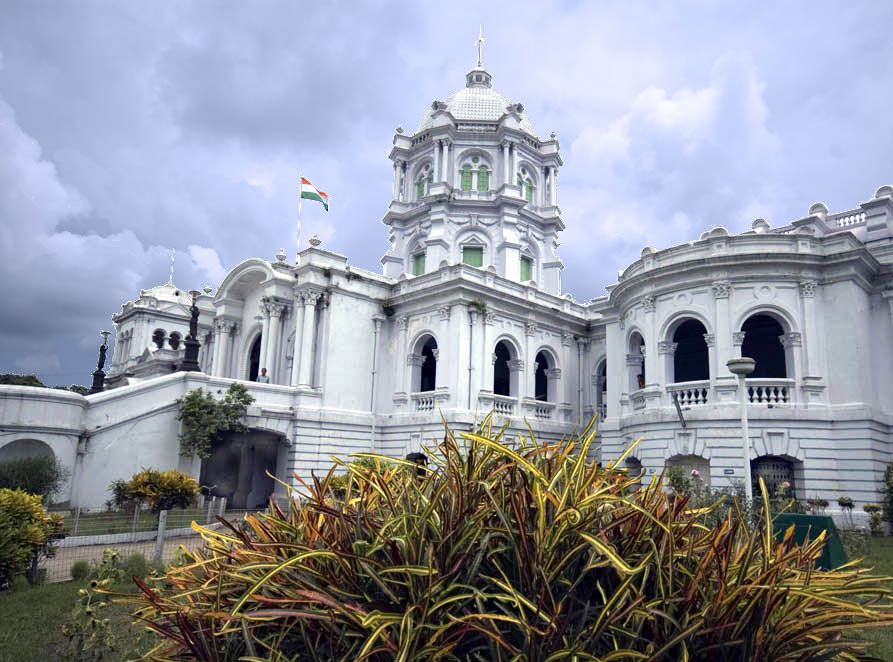
Ujjayanta Palace, built in the 19th century as a replacement for a former royal palace destroyed in an earthquake, was used until 2011 as the meeting place of Tripura's State Legislative Assembly.

Tripura is governed through a parliamentary system of representative democracy, a feature it shares with other Indian states. Universal suffrage is granted to residents. The Tripura government has three branches: executive, legislature and judiciary. The Tripura Legislative Assembly consists of elected members and special office bearers that are elected by the members. Assembly meetings are presided over by the Speaker or the Deputy Speaker in case of Speaker's absence. The Assembly is unicameral with 60 Members of the Legislative Assembly (MLA). The members are elected for a term of five years, unless the Assembly is dissolved prior to the completion of the term. The judiciary is composed of the Tripura High Court and a system of lower courts. Executive authority is vested in the Council of Ministers headed by the Chief Minister. The Governor, the titular head of state, is appointed by the President of India. The leader of the party or a coalition of parties with a majority in the Legislative Assembly is appointed as the chief minister by the governor. The Council of Ministers are appointed by the governor on the advice of the chief minister. The Council of Ministers reports to the Legislative Assembly.

Tripura Tribal Areas Autonomous District Council, pictured, encompasses much of the state.

Tripura sends two representatives to the Lok Sabha (the lower house of the parliament of India) and one representative to the Rajya Sabha (parliament's upper house). In the 2024 Indian general election, both parliament lower house seats were won by the Bharatiya Janata Party. Panchayats, (local self-governments) elected by local body elections operate in many villages for self-governance. Tripura also has a unique tribal self-governance body, the Tripura Tribal Areas Autonomous District Council. This council is responsible for some aspects of local governance in 527 villages with high density of the scheduled tribes.

The main political parties are the Bharatiya Janata Party (BJP), the Left Front, the All India Trinamool Congress and Indian National Congress along with regional parties like the IPFT and INPT. Until 1977, the state was governed by the Indian National Congress. The Left Front was in power from 1978 to 1988, and then again from 1993 to 2018. In 1988–93, the Congress and Tripura Upajati Juba Samiti were in a ruling coalition. In the 2013 Tripura Legislative Assembly election, the Left Front won 50 out of 60 seats in the Assembly. The 2018 assembly election resulted in loss for the Left Front; the Bharatiya Janata Party won an overall majority in the state, resulting in the end of the Communist Party's uninterrupted twenty-five year rule. The BJP won 44 out of 60 seats in the Assembly by coalition with the IPFT. The CPI (M) only got 16 seats and Indian National Congress lost by huge margins in all constituencies.

The 2023 assembly election resulted in re-election of the BJP government, which won 33 out of 60 seats in the Assembly by coalition with the IPFT. The TMP emerged as the second largest party and the Left Front won just 11 seats and was pushed to third place.

Communism in the state had its beginnings in the pre-independence era, inspired by freedom struggle activities in Bengal, and culminating in regional parties with communist leanings. It capitalised on the tribal dissatisfaction with the mainstream rulers, and has been noted for connection with the "sub-national or ethnic searches for identity".

Since the 1990s, there has been an ongoing irredentist Tripura rebellion, involving militant outfits such as the National Liberation Front of Tripura and the All Tripura Tiger Force (ATTF); terrorist incidents involving the ATTF claimed a recorded number of 389 victims in the seven-year period from 1993 to 2000. The Armed Forces (Special Powers) Act, 1958 (AFSPA) was first enforced in Tripura on 16 February 1997 when terrorism was at its peak in the state. The Act, as per its provisions, was subsequently reviewed and extended every six months. However, in view of the improvement in the situation and fewer terrorist activities being reported, the Tripura government in June 2013 reduced operational areas of the AFSPA to 30 police station areas. The last six-month extension to AFSPA was approved in November 2014, and after about 18 years of operation, it was repealed on 29 May 2015.

== Economy ==
GSDP at constant prices (2004–05 base) Figures in billions of Indian rupees
| Year | GSDP |
| 2004–05 | 89.04 |
| 2005–06 | 94.82 |
| 2006–07 | 102.02 |
| 2007–08 | 109.88 |
| 2008–09 | 115.96 |
| 2009–10 | 122.48 |
| 2010–11 | 129.47 |

Tripura's gross state domestic product for 2022–23 was ₹640 billion (US$6.8 billion) at constant price (2022–23), recording 10.38% growth over the previous year. In the same period, the GDP of India was ₹277,520 billion (US$3.0 trillion), with a growth rate of 8.55%. Annual per capita income at current price of the state was ₹157,752 (US$1,700), compared to the national per capita income ₹197,280 (US$2,100). In 2009, the tertiary sector of the economy (service industries) was the largest contributor to the gross domestic product of the state, contributing 53.98 per cent of the state's economy compared to 23.07 per cent from the primary sector (agriculture, forestry, mining) and 22.95 per cent from the secondary sector (industrial and manufacturing). According to the Economic Census of 2005, after agriculture, the maximum number of workers were engaged in retail trade (28.21% of total non-agricultural workforce), followed by manufacturing (18.60%), public administration (14.54%), and education (14.40%).

Tripura is an agrarian state with more than half of the population dependent on agriculture and allied activities. However, due to hilly terrain and forest cover, only 27% of the land is available for cultivation. Rice, the major crop of the state, is cultivated in 91% of the cropped area. According to the Directorate of Economics & Statistics, Government of Tripura, in 2009–10, potato, sugarcane, mesta, pulses and jute were the other major crops cultivated in the state. Jackfruit and pineapple top the list of horticultural products. Traditionally, most of the indigenous population practised jhum method (a type of slash-and-burn) of cultivation. The number of people dependent on jhum has declined over the years.

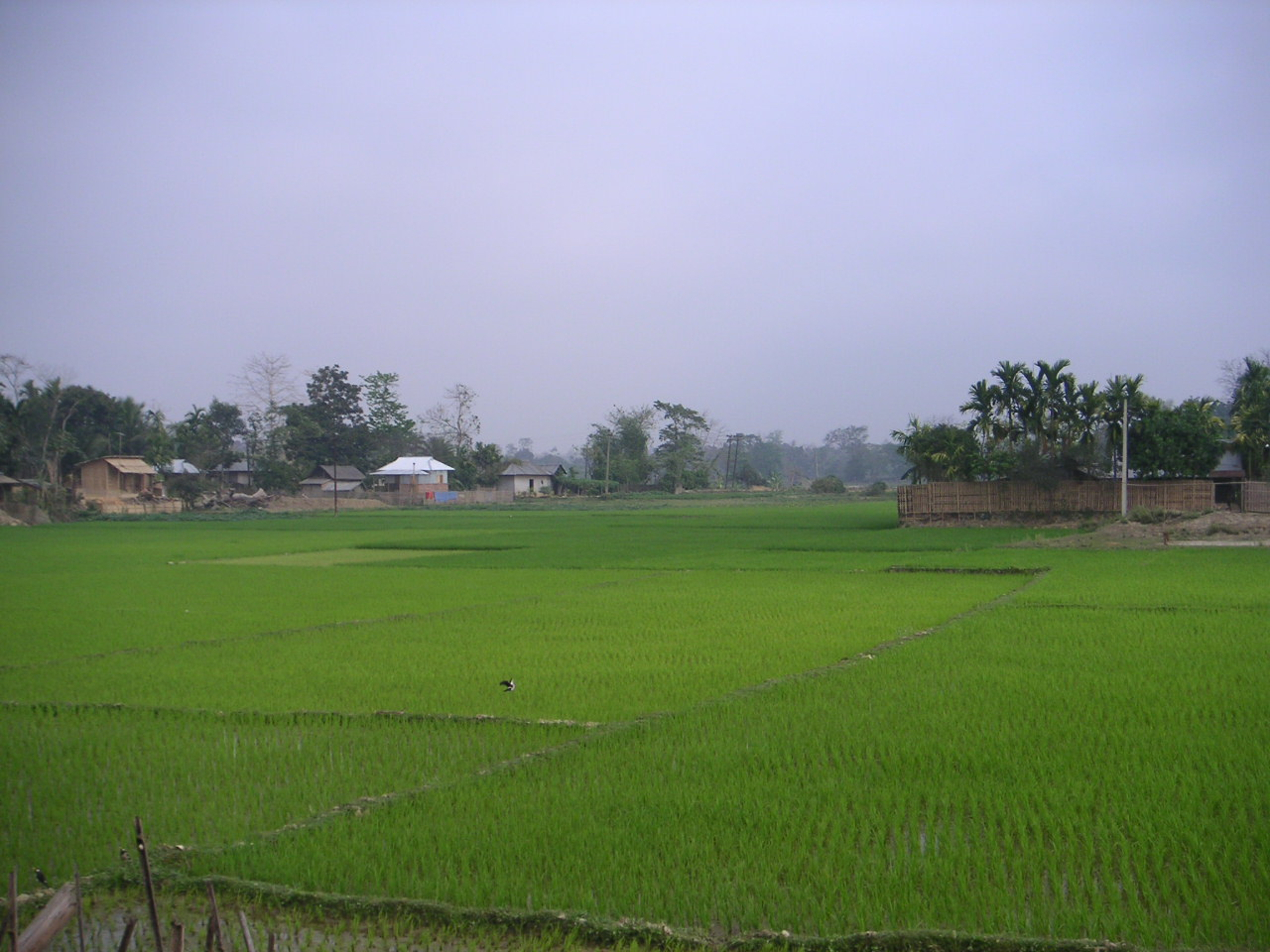
Rice is the major crop in Tripura and accounts for 91 per cent of the land under cultivation.

Fish farming has made significant advances in the state. At the end of 2009–10, the state produced a surplus of 104.3 million fish seeds, primarily carp. Rubber and tea are the important cash crops of the state. Tripura ranks second to Kerala in the production of natural rubber in the country. The state is known for its handicraft, particularly hand-woven cotton fabric, wood carvings, and bamboo products. High quality timber including sal, garjan, teak and gamar are found abundantly in the forests of Tripura. Tata Trusts signed a pact with Government of Tripura in July 2015 to improve fisheries and dairy production in the state.

Per Capita Income with 2004–05 Base
| Year | Tripura |
| 2004–05 | 24,394 |
| 2005–06 | 26,668 |
| 2006–07 | 29,081 |
| 2007–08 | 31,111 |
| 2008–09 | 33,350 |
| 2010–11 | 33,493 |
| 2011–12 | 47,079 |
| 2012–13 | 52,434 |
| 2013–14 | 61,570 |
| 2014–15 | 69,474 |
| 2015–16 | 83,680 |
| 2016–17 | 90,827 |
| 2017–18 | 100,477 |
| 2018–19 | 113,102 |
| 2019–20 | 139,512 |
| 2020–21 | 147,501 |

The industrial sector of the state continues to be highly underdeveloped – brickfields and tea industry are the only two organised sectors. Tripura has considerable reservoirs of natural gas. According to estimates by Oil and Natural Gas Corporation (ONGC), the state has 400 billion metres^{3} reserves of natural gas, with 16 billion metres^{3} is recoverable. ONGC produced 480 million metres^{3} natural gas in the state, in 2006–07. In 2011 and 2013, new large discoveries of natural gas were announced by ONGC. Tourism industry in the state is growing – the revenue earned in tourism sector crossed ₹10 million (US$110,000) for the first time in 2009–10, and surpassed ₹15 million (US$160,000) in 2010–11. Although Bangladesh is in a trade deficit with India, its export to Tripura is significantly more than import from the state; a report in the newspaper The Hindu estimated Bangladesh exported commodities valued at about ₹3.5 billion (US$37 million) to the state in 2012, as opposed to "very small quantity" of import. Alongside legal international trade, unofficial and informal cross-border trade is rampant. In a research paper published by the Institute of Developing Economies in 2004, the dependence of Tripura's economy on that of Bangladesh was emphasised.

The economy of Tripura can be characterised by the high rate of poverty, low capital formation, inadequate infrastructure facilities, geographical isolation and communication bottlenecks, inadequate exploration and use of forest and mineral resources, slow industrialisation and high unemployment. More than 50% of the population depends on agriculture for sustaining their livelihood. However agriculture and allied activities contribution to Gross State Domestic Production (GSDP) is only 23%, this is primarily because of low capital base in the sector. Despite the inherent limitation and constraints coupled with severe resource shortages for investing in basic infrastructure, this has brought consistent progress in the quality of life and income of people across all sections of society. The state government through its Tripura Industrial Policy and Tripura Industrial Incentives Scheme, 2012, has offered heavy subsidies in capital investment and transport, preferences in government procurement, waivers in tender processes and fees, yet the impact has not been much significant beyond a few industries being set up in the Bodhjungnagar Industrial Growth Centre.

The Planning Commission estimates the poverty rate of all North East Indian states by using headcount ratio of Assam (the second largest state in North East India after Arunachal Pradesh). According to 2001 Planning Commission assessment, 22 per cent of Tripura's rural residents were below the poverty line. However, the Tripura government's independent assessment, based on consumption distribution data, reported that, in 2001, 55 per cent of the rural population was below the poverty line. Geographic isolation and communication bottlenecks coupled with insufficient infrastructure have restricted economic growth of the state. High rate of poverty and unemployment continues to be prevalent.

== Transport ==
=== Air ===
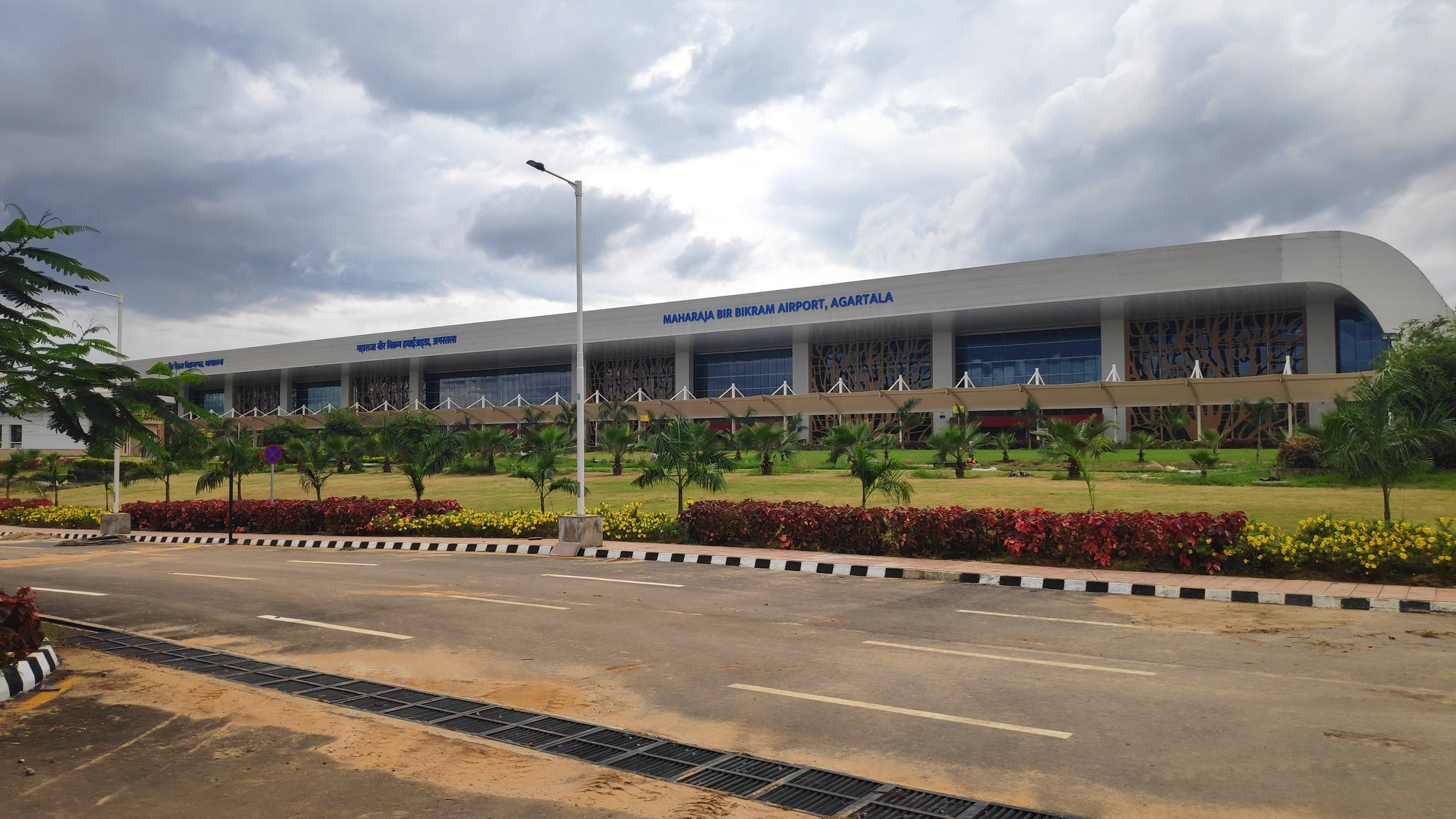
Maharaja Bir Bikram Airport

Maharaja Bir Bikram Airport, located 12 km northwest of Agartala at Singerbhil, is the second busiest airport in northeast India after Guwahati. There are direct flights to Kolkata, Imphal, Delhi, Shillong, Guwahati, Bangalore, Dibrugarh, Aizawl, Ahmedabad. The major airlines are flybig, Air India, Akasa Air, Spicejet and IndiGo. Passenger helicopter services are available between the capital and major towns (Kailashahar, Dharmanagar) as well as to more remote areas such as Kanchanpur, Belonia and Gandacherra.

=== Railway ===
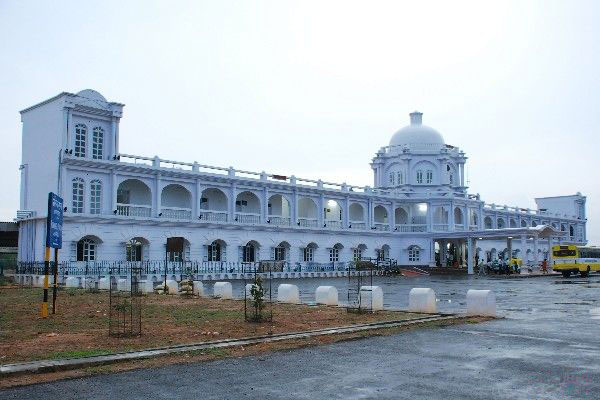
Agartala Railway Station

Agartala was connected to India's railway network with the advent of the railways in the subcontinent in 1853 but the link was broken when India was partitioned in 1947. Railway services were established in Tripura in 1964 by constructing 1,000 mm (3 ft 3 3/8 in) metre gauge track from Lumding in Assam to Dharmanagar and Kailasahar in Tripura but the track did not reach Agartala. Rail transport was absent in the state until 2008–09 when the railway track was extended to the capital Agartala. The metre gauge rail track was connected to 5 ft 6 in (1,676 mm) broad gauge at Lumding. The major railway stations in this line are in Agartala, Dharmanagar, and Kumarghat. This metre gauge track was converted to 1,676 mm (5 ft 6 in) broad gauge in 2016 and now trains run from Agartala to Kolkata and Delhi. The total length of this railway track in Tripura state is 153 km. It is a single line without electrification. The Agartala sabroom line was coupled and became fully operational from 2019.

A new railway line is being laid westwards from Agartala to Akhaura in Bangladesh. This will reduce the distance between Agartala and Kolkata by over 1000 km and provide rail access to the Port of Chittagong.

Some major Express trains that operate from Agartala are – Agartala – Anand Vihar Terminal Rajdhani Express

- Agartala – KSR Bengaluru Humsafar Express
- Agartala – Firozpur Cantonment Tripura Sundari Express
- Agartala – Sealdah Kanchanjunga Express
- Agartala – Deoghar Weekly Express
- Agartala – Rani Kamlapati(Bhopal) Weekly Express
- Agartala – Secunderabad Superfast Special
- Agartala – Jiribam Janshatabdi Express

=== Road ===
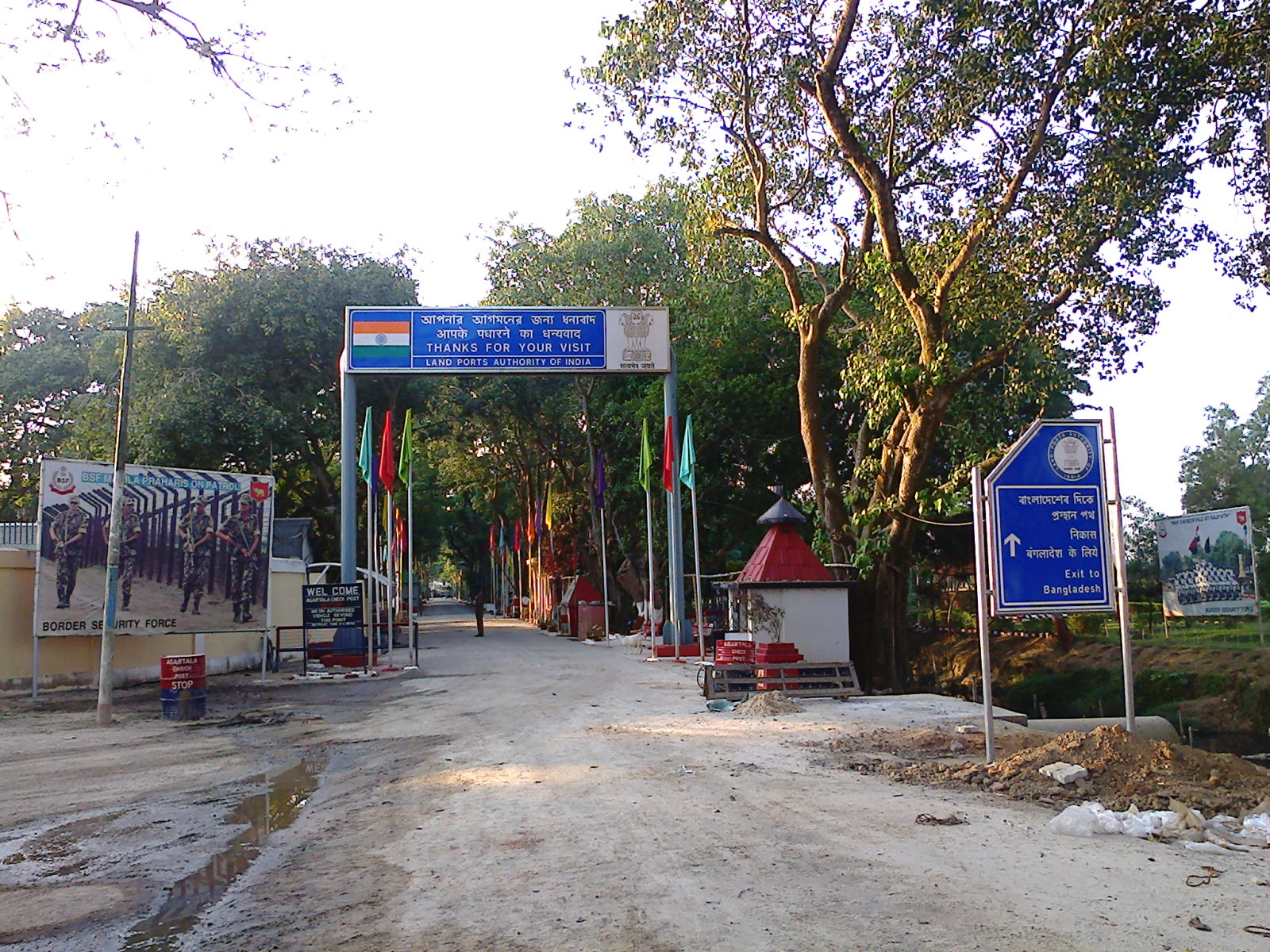
The border post between Bangladesh and India in Akhaura

Only one major road, the National Highway 8 (NH-8), connects Tripura to the rest of India. Starting at Sabroom in southern Tripura, it heads north to the capital Agartala, turns east and then north-east to enter the state of Assam. Locally known as "Assam Road", the NH-8 is often called the lifeline of Tripura. However, the highway is single lane and of poor quality; often landslides, rains or other disruptions on the highway cut the state off from its neighbours. Another National Highway, NH 108, connects the town of Panisagar in northern Tripura with Aizawl, Mizoram. The Tripura Road Transport Corporation is the government agency overlooking public transport on road. A hilly and land-locked state, Tripura is dependent mostly on roads for transport. The total length of roads in the state is 16,931 km (10,520 mi) of which national highways constitute 88 km (55 mi) and state highways 689 km (428 mi), as of 2009–10. Residents in rural areas frequently use waterways as a mode of transport.

Tripura has an 856 km (532 mi) long international border with Bangladesh, of which 777.4 km (483.1 mi) is fenced, as of 2012. Several locations along the border serve as bilateral trading points between India and Bangladesh, such as Akhaura near Agartala, Raghna, Srimantpur, Belonia, Khowai and Kailasahar. A bus service exists between Agartala and Dhaka, the capital of Bangladesh. In 2013, the two countries signed an agreement to establish a 15 km (9.3 mi) railway link between Agartala and the Akhaura junction of Bangladesh. Citizens of both countries need visa to legally enter the other country; however, illegal movement and smuggling across the border are widespread.

== Media and communication ==
Doordarshan (DD) has a television station in Agartala.

As of 2014, 56 daily and weekly newspapers are published in Tripura. Most of the newspapers are published in Bengali, except for one Kokborok daily (Hachukni Kok), one Manipuri weekly (Marup), two English dailies and three bilingual weeklies. Notable dailies include Ajkal Tripura, Daily Desher Katha, Dainik Sambad and Syandan Patrika. In a study by Indian Institute of Mass Communication in 2009, 93% of the sampled in Tripura rated television as very effective for information and mass education. In the study, 67% of the sampled listened to radio and 80–90% read newspaper. Most of the major Indian telecommunication companies are present in the state, such as Airtel, Vi, Jio and BSNL. Mobile connections outnumber landline connections by a wide margin. As of 2011, the state-controlled BSNL has 57,897 landline subscribers and 325,279 GSM mobile service connections. There are 84 telephone exchanges (for landlines) and 716 post offices in the state, as of 2011.

=== Electricity ===
Till 2014, Tripura was a power deficit state. In late 2014, Tripura reached surplus electricity production capacity by using its recently discovered natural gas resources, and installing high efficiency gas turbine power plants. The state has many power-generating stations. These are owned by Tripura State Electricity Corporation (TSECL), natural gas-powered thermal power stations at Rokhia and Baramura, and the ONGC Tripura Power Company in Palatana. The ONGC plant has a capacity of 726.6 MW, with the second plant's commissioning in November 2014. It is the largest individual power plant in the northeast region.

The state also has a hydro power station on the Gumti River. The combined power generation from these three stations is 100–105 MW. The North Eastern Electric Power Corporation (NEEPCO) operates the 84 MW Agartala Gas Turbine Power Plant near Agartala. As of November 2014, another thermal power plant is being built at Monarchak.

With the newly added power generation capacity, Tripura has with enough capacity to supply all seven sister states of northeast India, as well export power to neighbouring countries such as Bangladesh. With recent discoveries, the state has abundant natural gas reserves to support many more power generation plants, but lacks pipeline and transport infrastructure to deliver the fuel or electricity to India's national grid.

=== Irrigation and fertilizers ===
As of 2011, 255,241 hectares (985 sq mi) of land in Tripura cultivable, of which 108,646 hectares (419 sq mi) has the potential to be covered by irrigation projects. However, only 74,796 hectares (289 sq mi) is irrigated. The state lacks major irrigation projects; it depends on medium-sized projects sourced from Gumti, Khowai (at Chakmaghat) and Manu rivers, and minor projects administered by village-level governing bodies that utilise tube wells, water pumps, tanks and lift irrigation.

ONGC and Chambal Fertilizers & Chemicals are jointly building a fertiliser plant to leverage ONGC's natural gas discoveries in Tripura. Expected to be in operation by 2017, the 1.3 million tonnes per year plant will supply the northeastern states.

=== Drinking water ===
Drinking Water and Sanitation (DWS) wing] of Public Works Department manages the drinking water supply in the state. Schools and Anganwadi centres have been specifically targeted to improve drinking water supply as well as attendance to these institutions. Many areas of Tripura have the problem of excessive iron content in groundwater requiring the installation of Iron Removal Plants (IRP). Tripura State has received the best State Award for Water & Sanitation under the category of Small States in the IBN7 Diamond State Award function for doing commendable work to provide drinking water supply to the people with the sparsely distributed tribal population in hamlets of hilly regions of the State. However, a study by the DWS Department found a depleting water table and excessive contamination. Still, packaged drinking water under brands "Tribeni", "Eco Freshh", "Blue Fina", "Life Drop" and "Aqua Zoom" among others is manufactured and sold in the state. Filters of many types and brands, in addition to locally manufactured ceramic type filters, are sold in the state although their acceptance in rural areas is less.

== Education ==
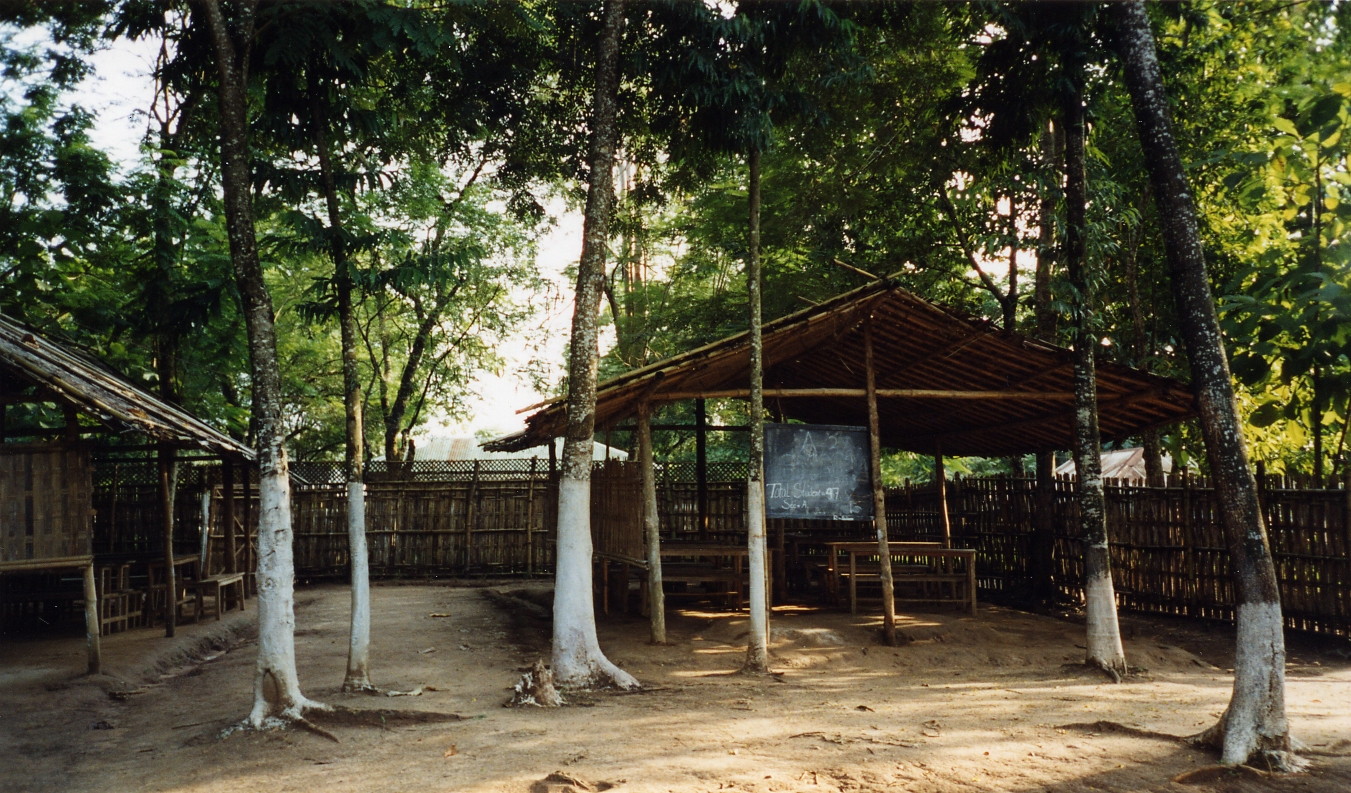
Classrooms built of bamboo in a school. In 2010–11, Tripura had 4,455 schools run by the state government or private organisations. Instruction is mainly in English or Bengali.

As per 2011 census, the literacy rate of Tripura was 87.75 per cent, the fourth-highest in India (which had a national literacy rate of 74.04 per cent). A state government survey in 2013 announced that Tripura has the highest literacy rate in India at 94.65 per cent. Schools in Tripura are run by the state government, TTAADC or private organisations, which include religious institutions. Instruction in schools is mainly in Bengali or English, though Kokborok and other regional languages are also used. Some of the special schools include Jawahar Navodaya Vidyalaya, Kasturba Gandhi Balika Vidyalaya, residential schools run by Tripura Tribal Welfare Residential Educational Institutions Society (TTWREIS), missionary organisations like St. Paul's, St. Arnold's, Holy Cross, Don Bosco, and St. John's. The schools are affiliated to the Council for the Indian School Certificate Examinations (CISCE), the Central Board for Secondary Education (CBSE), the National Institute of Open Schooling (NIOS) or the Tripura Board of Secondary Education. Under the 10+2+3 plan, after completing secondary school, students typically enroll for two years in a junior college or in a higher secondary school affiliated either to the Tripura Board of Secondary Education or to other central boards. Students choose from one of the three streams—liberal arts, commerce or science. As in the rest of India, after passing the Higher Secondary Examination (the grade 12 examination), students may enroll in general degree programs such as bachelor's degree in arts, commerce or science, or professional degree programs such as engineering, law or medicine.

According to the Economic Review of Tripura 2010–11, Tripura has a total of 4,455 schools, of which 2,298 are primary schools. The total enrolment in all schools of the state is 767,672. Tripura has one Central University (Tripura University), one State University (M. B. B. University) and one private university (a branch of the Institute of Chartered Financial Analysts of India). There are 15 general colleges, three engineering colleges (Tripura Institute of Technology, National Institute of Technology, Agartala and NIEILT, Agartala), two medical colleges (Agartala Government Medical College and Tripura Medical College), three nursing or paramedical colleges, three polytechnic colleges, one law college, one Government Music College, one College of Fisheries, Institute of Advance Studies in Education, one Regional College of Physical Education at Panisagar and one art college.

== Healthcare ==
Health indices as of 2010
| Indicator | Tripura | India |
| Birth rate | 14.9 | 22.1 |
| Death rate | 5.0 | 7.2 |
| Infant mortality rate | 27 | 47 |
| Total fertility rate | 2.2 | 2.7 |
| Natural growth rate | 9.9 | 14.9 |

Healthcare in Tripura features a universal health care system run by the Ministry of Health & Family Welfare of the Government of Tripura. The health care infrastructure is divided into three tiers – the primary health care network, a secondary care system comprising district and sub-divisional hospitals and tertiary hospitals providing speciality and super speciality care. As of 2010–11, there are 17 hospitals, 11 rural hospitals and community health centres, 79 primary health centres, 635 sub-centres/dispensaries, 7 blood banks and 7 blood storage centres in the state. Homeopathic and Ayurvedic styles of medicine are also popular in the state. The National Family Health Survey – 3 conducted in 2005–06 revealed that 20% of the residents of Tripura do not generally use government health facilities, and prefers the private medical sector. This is overwhelmingly less than the national level, where 65.6% do not rely on government facilities. As in the rest of India, Tripura residents also cite poor quality of care as the most frequent reason for non-reliance over the public health sector. Other reasons include distance of the public sector facilities, long waiting time, and inconvenient hours of operation. As of 2010, the state's performance in major public health care indices, such as birth rate, infant mortality rate and total fertility rate is better than the national average. The state is vulnerable to epidemics of malaria, diarrhoea, Japanese encephalitis and meningitis. In summer 2014 the state witnessed a major malaria outbreak.

== Demographics ==
=== Population ===
Historical population
| Year | Pop. | ±% |
|---|---|---|
| 1871 | 65,334 | — |
| 1881 | 95,637 | +46.4% |
| 1891 | 137,442 | +43.7% |
| 1901 | 173,325 | +26.1% |
| 1911 | 229,613 | +32.5% |
| 1921 | 304,437 | +32.6% |
| 1931 | 382,450 | +25.6% |
| 1941 | 513,010 | +34.1% |
| 1951 | 639,029 | +24.6% |
| 1961 | 1,142,005 | +78.7% |
| 1971 | 1,556,342 | +36.3% |
| 1981 | 2,053,058 | +31.9% |
| 1991 | 2,757,205 | +34.3% |
| 2001 | 3,199,203 | +16.0% |
| 2011 | 3,673,917 | +14.8% |
Source: Census of India

Tripura ranks second to Assam as the most populous state in North East India. According to the provisional results of 2011 census of India, Tripura has a population of 3,671,032 with 1,871,867 males and 1,799,165 females. It constitutes 0.3% of India's population. The sex ratio of the state is 961 females per thousand males, higher than the national ratio 940. The population density is 350 persons per square kilometre. The literacy rate of Tripura in 2011 was 87.75%, above the national average of 74.04%, and third highest among all the states.

Tripura ranked sixth in Human Development Index (HDI) among 35 states and union territories of India, according to the 2006 estimate by India's Ministry of Women and Child Development; the HDI of Tripura was 0.663, better than the all-India HDI of 0.605.

In 2011, the police in Tripura recorded 5,803 cognisable offences under the Indian Penal Code, a number second only to Assam (66,714) in North East India. The crime rate in the state was 158.1 per 100,000 people, less than the all-India average of 192.2. However, 2010 reports showed that the state topped all the states for crime against women, with a rate of 46.5 per 100,000 people, significantly more than the national rate of 18.

=== Ethnic groups ===
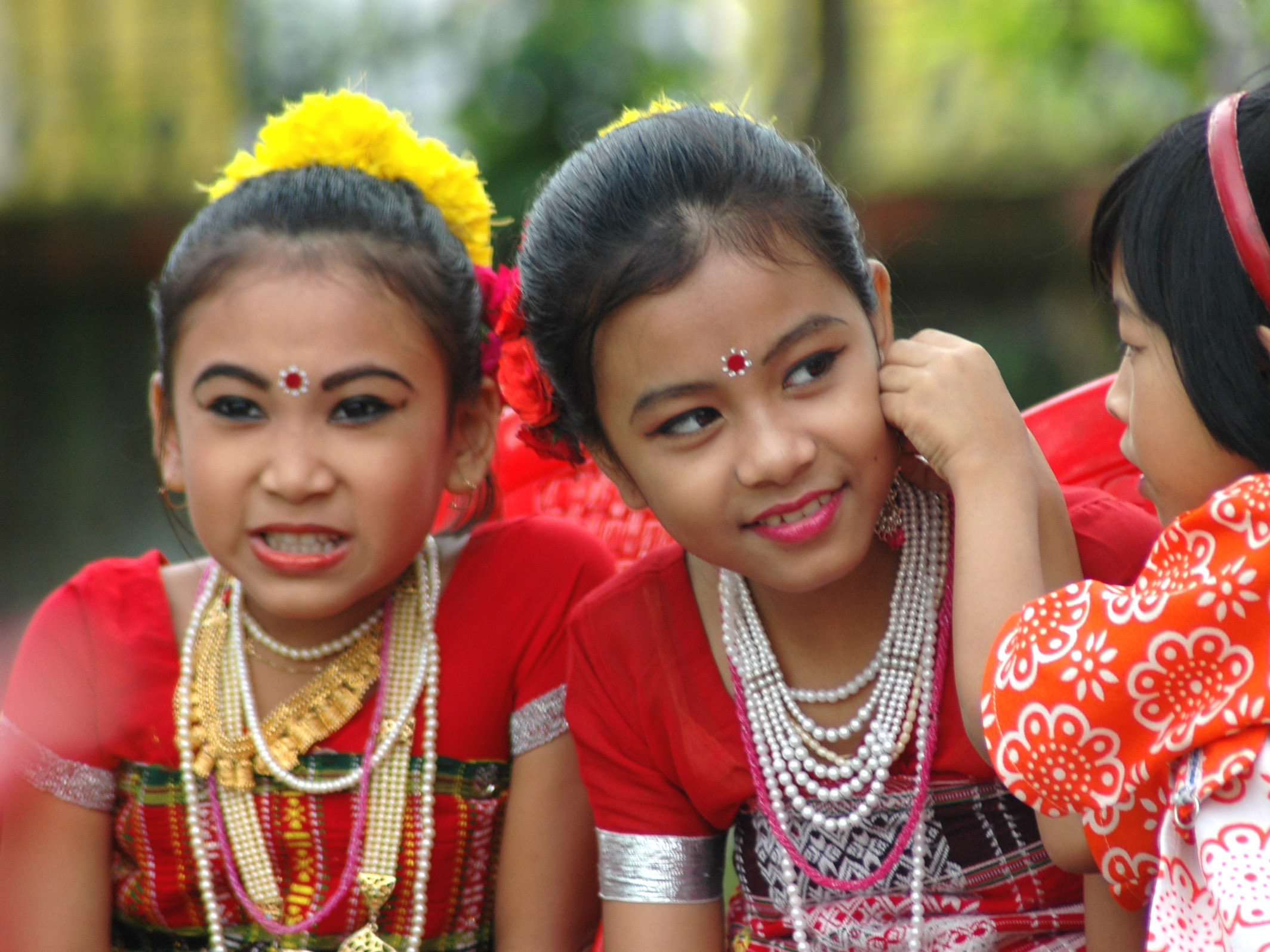
Tripuri children preparing for a dance performance

According to the 2001 census of India, Bengalis represented almost 65 per cent of Tripura's population while the scheduled tribe population (including the Tripuris) amounted to a little over 30 per cent, with rest belonging to other minorities including Hindi speakers. The state's scheduled tribes, recognised by the country's constitution, consist of 19 ethnic groups and many sub-groups, with diverse languages and cultures. In 2001, the largest such group were Kokborok-speaking Tripuris, who had a population of 543,848, representing 17.0 per cent of the state's population and 54.7 per cent of the scheduled tribe population. The other major groups, in descending order of population, were the Reang (16.6), Jamatia (7.5 per cent), Chakma (6.5 per cent), Halam (4.8 per cent), Mog (3.1 per cent), Munda (1.2 per cent), Any Kuki Tribes (1.2 per cent), Garo (1.1 per cent) and a sizeable Meitei population.

There are approximately 35,000–40,000 members of the Bru (Reang) tribe in the state, who came as refugees from Mizoram after the 1997 ethnic violence.

=== Languages ===
Languages of Tripura (2011)
1. Bengali (63.4%)
2. Tripuri (25.9%)
3. Chakma (2.29%)
4. Mogh (Marma) (0.97%)
5. Meitei (Manipuri) (0.64%)
6. Halam (0.62%)
7. Bishnupriya Manipuri (0.60%)
8. Others (5.53%)

The official languages of the state are Bengali, English and Kokborok (Tripuri). Bengali is the most widely spoken language, while Kokborok is the most prominent language among the Tripuri people. Other minority languages such as Mog, Manipuri, Halam (Old Kuki), Garo and Chakma, Odia, Bishnupriya, belonging to Indo-European and Sino-Tibetan families are spoken in the state. Saimar, a nearly extinct language, was spoken by only four people in one village as of 2012.

=== Religion ===
Growth of Religions in Tripura (1951–2011)
| Census Year | Hinduism (%) | Islam (%) | Christianity (%) |
|---|---|---|---|
| 1951 | 63.97 | 24.31 | 0.17 |
| 1961 | 71.53 | 24.83 | 0.36 |
| 1971 | 74.55 | 23.63 | 0.56 |
| 1981 | 85.55 | 12.96 | 1.21 |
| 1991 | 85.34 | 11.93 | 1.69 |
| 2001 | 85.59 | 8.97 | 3.18 |
| 2011 | 83.40 | 8.60 | 4.35 |

Religion in Tripura (2011)
1. Hinduism (83.4%)
2. Islam (8.60%)
3. Christianity (4.35%)
4. Buddhism (3.41%)
5. Other or not stated (0.24%)

According to 2011 census, Hinduism is the majority religion in the state, followed by 83.40% of the population. Muslims make up 8.60% of the population, Christians 4.35%, and Buddhists 3.41%. Christianity is chiefly followed by members of the Kuki tribes (Halam, Ranglong, Hrangkhol, Lushai, Darlong, Thadou people etc.) and as per 2011 census has 159,882 adherents.

=== By geography ===
Most of the area of Tripura is part of the TTAADC area, which is an Autonomous Region within Tripura under 6th schedule of the Indian Constitution and the western part of Tripura is called the General ward area, where Bengalis formed the overwhelming majority of the population.

Autonomous councils in North East India

The total area of the TTAADC is about 7,132.56 km^{2}, which covers about 68% of the total area (10,491 km^{2}) of Tripura respectively. It's a thinly populated area of the state with vast area.

Ethnicity in TTAADC area (2011 Census)
1. Scheduled Tribes (83.4%)
2. Bengalis (16.0%)
3. Others (0.60%)

The population of the TTAADC area is 1,216,465 out of which the Native Scheduled Tribes (Tripuris) are 1,021,560, constituting an overwhelming 83.4% of the region's population. While the population of General ward area of Tripura is 2,457,452 but out of total 10,491 km^{2} state area, the General region have a total area of only 3,358.44 km^{2}, which covers only about 32% of the total area of the state.

Out of the total population of 3,673,917 (as per 2011 census) the population of Scheduled Tribes is 1,166,813 (31.76% of the state population). Therefore, the number of Scheduled Tribes of the state who reside in the TTAADC area is 87.55% of the total Indigenous population of Tripura as a whole, while small segments of the native Tribes population also reside in General ward area.

=== Arrival of Bengali refugees ===
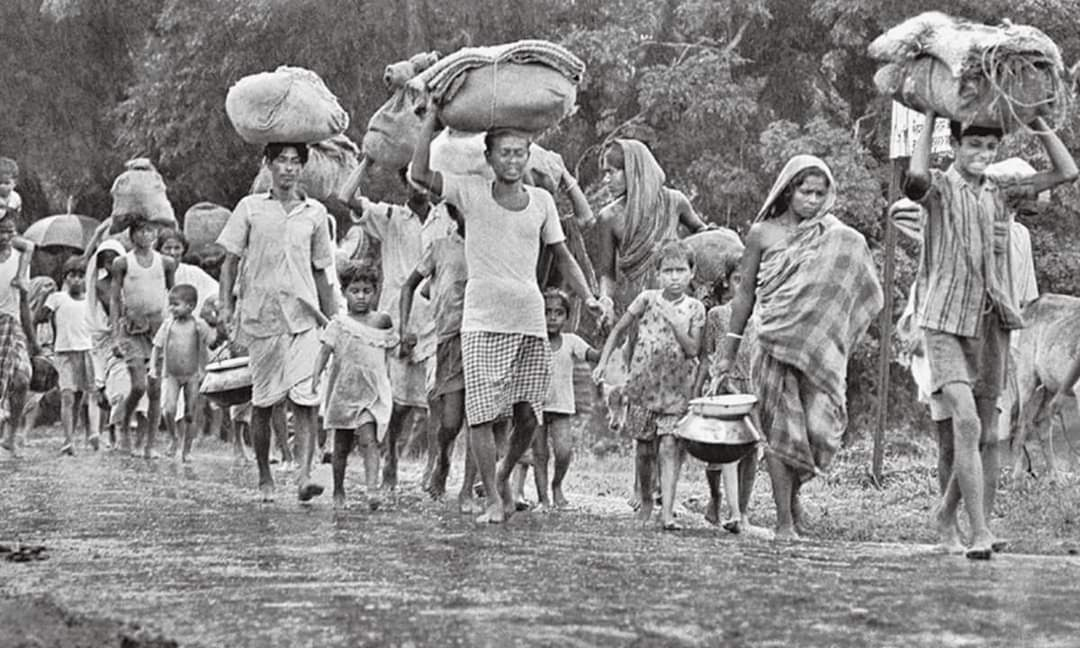
East Bengali refugees coming to Tripura during Bangladesh liberation war

During the Partition of Bengal in 1947, hundreds of thousands of Bengali refugees fled from East Bengal into India's Tripura following the Partition of India. It is estimated that between the years 1947–51, around 610,000 Bengalis — a figure almost equal to the state's total population poured into the state leading to a profound demographic change during this first phase. Again during the Bangladesh liberation war of 1971, in the second phase of migration, around 1.038 million Bengalis (most being Hindus) moved into various parts of Tripura as refugees with most of them settling down permanently afterwards. Until Bangladesh liberation war, Tripura had sheltered around 1.3 million refugees. The number of the refugees was almost equal to the indigenous population and the majority of them were rehabilitated and permanently settled in Tripura, altering the demography which became the basis of changes in resource distribution, economy, culture, polity, society and a cause of conflicts between the immigrants and the indigenous peoples.

Annual Arrival of Bengali refugees in Tripura
| Year | Numbers |
|---|---|
| 1946 (riot year) | 3,327 |
| 1947 (year of Partition) | 8,124 |
| 1948 | 9,554 |
| 1949 (communal disturbance) | 11,575 |
| 1950 (serious communal riots) | 67,151 |
| 1951 | 184,000 |
| 1952 (serious riots) | 233,000 |
| 1953 | 80,000 |
| 1954 | 4,700 |
| 1955 | 17,500 |
| 1956 | 50,700 |
| 1957 | 57,700 |
| 1958 | 3,600 |
| 1964–65 (serious riots) | 100,340 |
| 1965–66 | 13,073 |
| 1966–67 | 1,654 |
| 1967–68 | 12,229 |
| 1968–69 | 3,120 |
| 1969–70 | 4,334 |
| 1970–71 (to 24 March) | 5,774 |
| From (1946–71) | Total – (871,455) |

== Culture ==
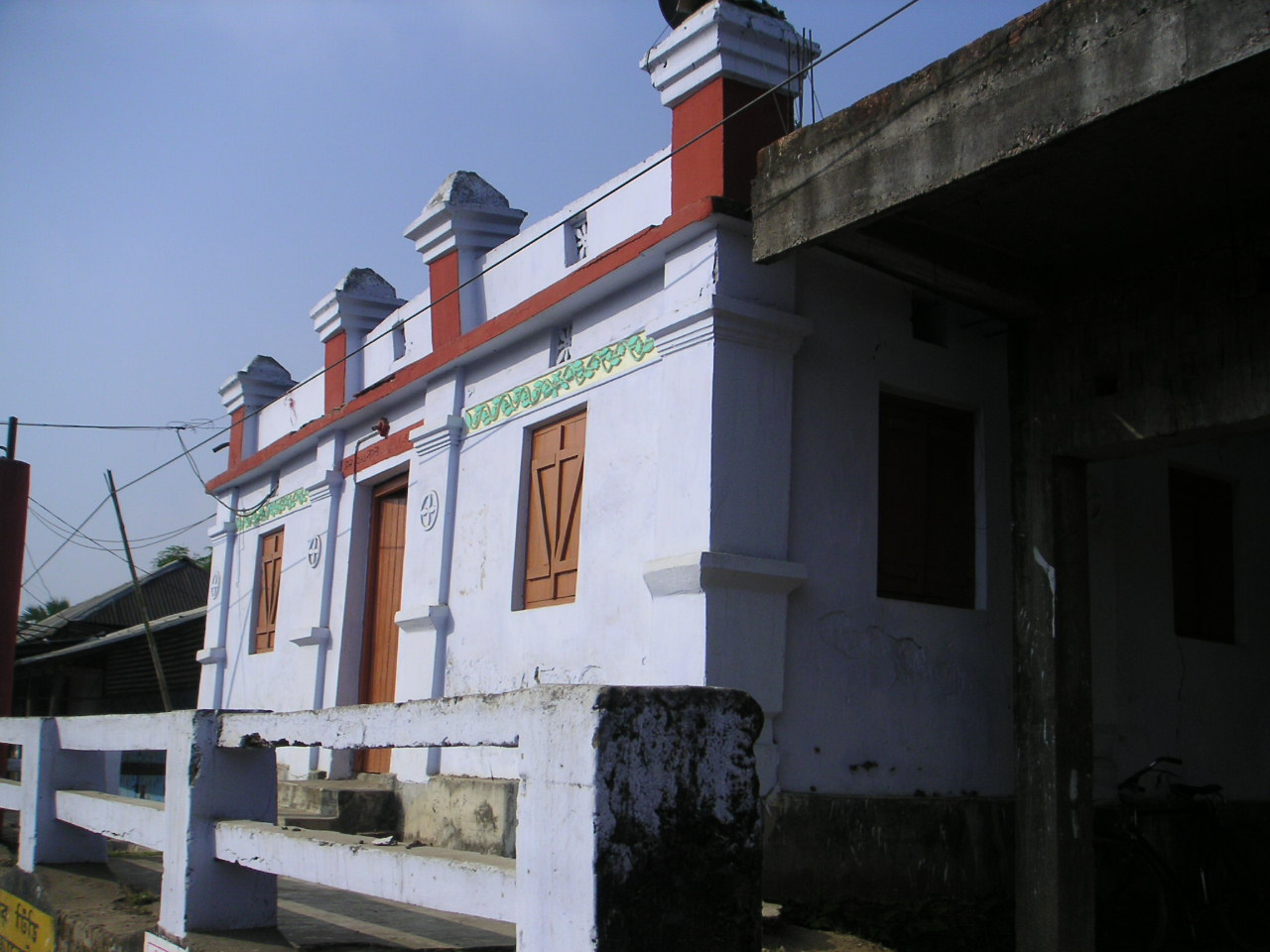
A mosque used for worship by the Muslims in Amarpur, Tripura.

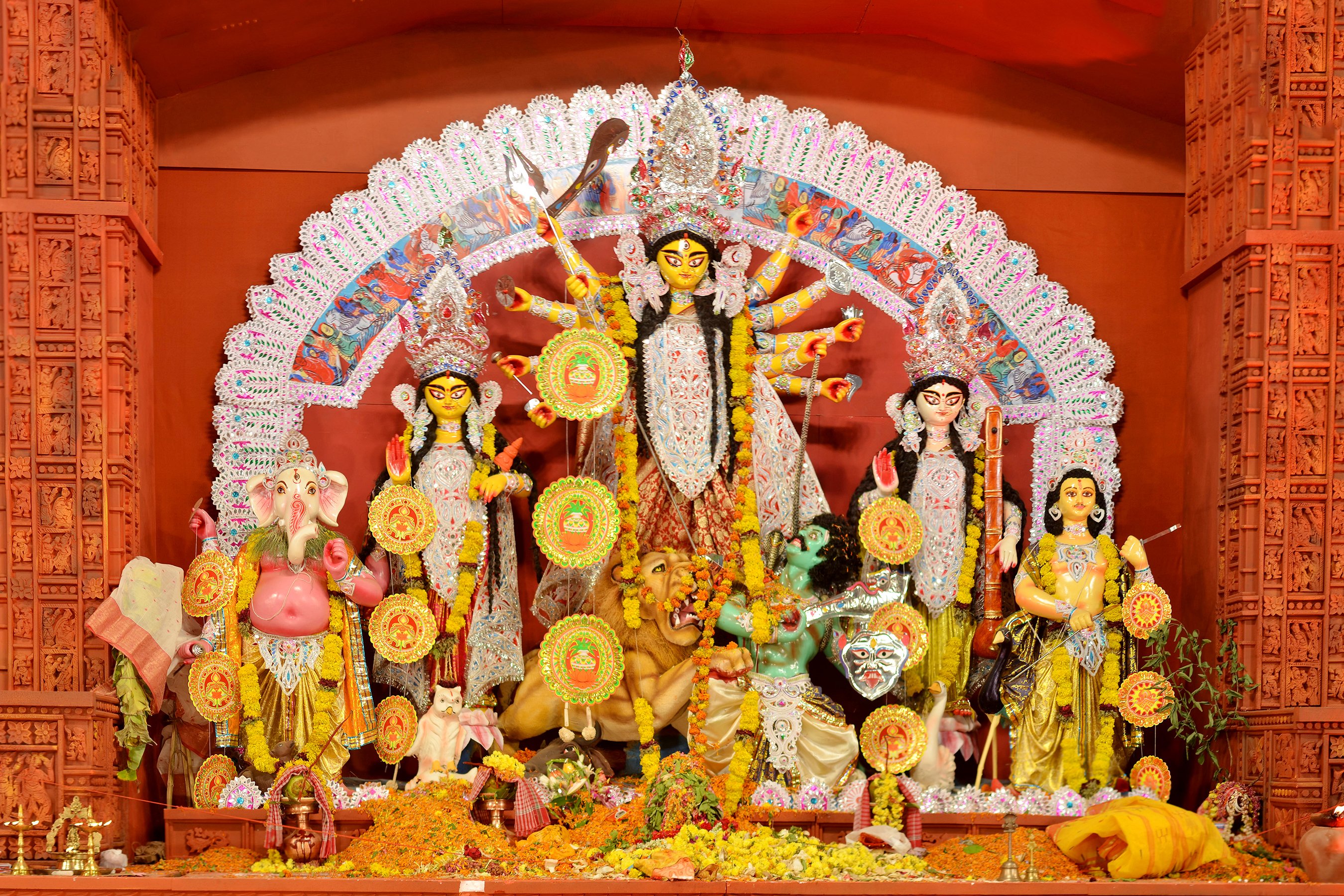
Durga Puja is the major festival of Tripura.

The diverse ethno-linguistic groups of Tripura have given rise to a composite culture. The major Tripuri clans are: Tripura, Debbarma, Jamatia, Reang, Noatia, and Murasing. And there are tribal groups such as Chakma, Halam(old kuki), Garo, Kuki, Mizo, Uchoi, Dhamai, Roaza, Mag, Munda, Oraon and Santhal who migrated in Tripura as tea labourers. Bengali people represent the largest ethno-linguistic community of the state. Bengali culture, as a result, is the main non-indigenous culture. The Tripuri Maharajas were great patrons of Bengali culture, especially literature; Bengali language replaced Kokborok as the language of the court. Elements of Bengali culture, such as Bengali literature, Bengali music, and Bengali cuisine are widespread, particularly in the urban areas of the state.

Tripura is noted for bamboo and cane handicrafts. Bamboo, wood and cane are used to create an array of furniture, utensils, hand-held fans, replicas, mats, baskets, idols and interior decoration materials. Music and dance are integral to the culture of the state. Some local musical instruments are the sarinda, chongpreng (both string instruments), and sumui (a type of flute). Each indigenous community has its own repertoire of songs and dances performed during weddings, religious occasions, and other festivities. The Tripuri and Jamatia people perform goria dance during the Goria puja. Jhum dance (also called tangbiti dance), lebang dance, mamita dance, and mosak sulmani dance are other Tripuri dance forms. Reang community, the second largest scheduled tribe of the state, is noted for its hojagiri dance that is performed by young girls balanced on earthen pitchers. Bizhu dance is performed by the Chakmas during the Bizhu festival (the last day of the month of Chaitra in Hindu calendar). Other dance forms include wangala dance of the Garo people, hai-hak dance of the Halam branch of Kuki people, and sangrai dance and owa dance of the Mog. Alongside such traditional music, mainstream Indian musical elements such as Indian classical music and dance, Rabindra Sangeet are also practised. Sachin Dev Burman, a member of the royal family, was a maestro in the filmi genre of Indian music.

Hindus believe that Tripura Sundari is the patron goddess of Tripura and an aspect of Shakti. Durga Puja, Kali Puja, Dolyatra, Ashokastami and the worship of the Chaturdasha deities are important festivals in the state. Some festivals represent confluence of different regional traditions, such as Ganga puja, Garia puja, Kharchi puja and Ker puja. Unakoti, Pilak and Devtamura are historic sites where large collections of stone carvings and rock sculptures are noted. Like Neermahal is a cultural Water Palace of this state. Sculptures are evidence of the presence of Buddhist and Brahmanical orders for centuries, and represent a rare artistic fusion of traditional organised religions and tribal influence.

=== Performing arts ===
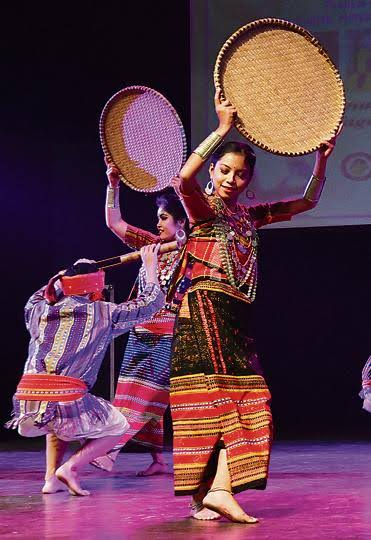
Tripuri dance

Tripura had a wide collection of notable art and cultural displays.

- Mamita dance: A Tripuri dance form performed during Mamita occasion, which is after the harvesting of year's first crops and to worship Ama Mailuma.
- Goria dance: Tripuri dance performed during Goria puja.
- Hojagiri dance: A divine Tripuri dance form. The dance is performed on the occasion of Hojagiri festivals or Laxmi Puja, held in the following full moon night of Durga Puja. generally after 3rd day of Dashera. The Goddess Mailuma (Tipra Indigenous Goddess) is worshipped on this day.
- Lebang dance: A Tripuri dance form.
- Mosak Sulmani dance: A Tripuri dance form.
- Jadu Kolija: A Tripuri folk-classical song.
- Dangsa Mwsamung: A type of Tripuri play performed on stage.

Other dance forms of minority groups include Sangrai dance and Owa dance of Mog, Hai-hak dance of Halam, Wangla dance of Garo, Bizhu dance of Chakma. Alongside such traditional music, mainstream Indian musical elements such as Indian classical music and dance are also practised. Sachin Dev Burman, a member of the Tripuri royal family, was a maestro in the filmi genre of Indian music.

Local musical instruments are:

- sarinda: A Tripuri string instrument.
- chongpreng: Tripuri string instrument.
- sumui: Tripuri flute.

== Sports ==
Football and cricket are the most popular sports in the state. The state capital Agartala has its own club football championships every year in which many local clubs compete in a league and knockout format. The Tripura cricket team participates in the Ranji Trophy, the Indian domestic cricket competition. The state is a regular participant of the Indian National Games and the North Eastern Games.

Tennis player Somdev Devvarman, who won the gold medal in the Men's Singles event at the 2010 Asian Games, has family roots in Tripura. He was the first Indian to win a gold medal in the men's singles tennis event of the Asian Games.

In 2016, Dipa Karmakar from Agartala became the first ever female gymnast from India to qualify for the Olympics when she qualified for the women's artistic gymnastics event of 2016 Summer Olympics. Other notable gymnasts from Tripura include Mantu Debnath, Kalpana Debnath, and Bishweshwar Nandi.

== See also ==
- Tipraland
- Habugra
- List of cities and towns in Tripura
- Tripura Industrial Development Corporation

== Bibliography ==
- Debbarma, Mousumi (29 July 2022). "Tripura's nuanced history to the present". Northeast India Through the Ages. pp. 332–354. doi:10.4324/9781003157816-14. ISBN 9781003157816. Archived from the original on 4 January 2023.
