= Habugra =

King - Tripura Language

Habugra is a term for "King" in Kokborok language of Tripura.

There were at least 184 kings that ruled Tripura before merging with the Republic of India on 15 November 1950. The last and most illustrious Habugra of all was Habugra Bir Bikram Manikya Debbarma.

The college of Maharaja Bir Bikram College was established in his memory in 1947 in the state capital Agartala.
