= Rowa Wildlife Sanctuary =

Wildlife sanctuary in Tripura, India

- IUCN category IV (habitat/species management area)
- Location within Tripura Location within India
- Interactive map of Rowa Wildlife Sanctuary
- Location: North Tripura district, Tripura
- Nearest city: Panisagar
- Coordinates: 24.29°N 92.17°E
- Area: 0.858 km^{2} (0.331 sq mi)
- Established: 1988

Rowa Wildlife Sanctuary is a wildlife sanctuary in the North Tripura district of the Indian state of Tripura. It is near the urban center of Panisagar and has significant anthropogenic pressure with risk of fragmentation. Even though precipitation is fairly high, the area still falls under fire risk, and has been categorized to be highly fire prone.

== Description ==
Rowa Wildlife Sanctuary encompasses an area of 0.858 km^{2} (0.331 sq mi) and was declared in 1988.

== Flora and fauna ==
Rowa Wildlife Sanctuary has deciduous forest, semi-evergreen forest and mixed moist deciduous secondary forests with patches of bamboo brakes. The flora is dominated by Microcos paniculata, Senna siamea and Macaranga denticulata.

Major wildlife include barking deer, wild boar, pig-tailed macaque, crab-eating mongoose, Indian porcupine, Indian rock python, and birds such as barbets, bulbuls, cuckoos, darters, pigeons, drongos, ducks, Old World orioles, owls, parakeets, partridges, sunbirds, woodpeckers, weaverbirds, treepies and jungle mynas.
