= Kulai, Dhalai =

The Indian village Kula jii is located in the taluk of Ambassa, district of Dhalai, in the State of Tripura.

== Location ==
- Kulai is located 19 km towards west from District headquarters Ambassa and 66 km from State capital Agartala
- Khowai, Kailasahar, Jogendranagar, Indranagar are nearby cities to Kulai
- Kanchanpur (2 km), Purba Nalicherra (2 km), Lalchhari (3 km), Paschim Lalchari (3 km), Jagannathpur (5 km) are nearby villages to Kulai
- Kulai is surrounded by Salema Tehsil towards North, Mungiakami Tehsil towards West, Manu Tehsil towards East, Tulashikhar Tehsil towards North
- Kulai is in the border of the Dhalai District and West Tripura District

== Language ==
Bengali is the local language in Kulai.

== Institutions ==
- Kulai Class XII School
