= Melaghar =

Town in Tripura, India

- Town
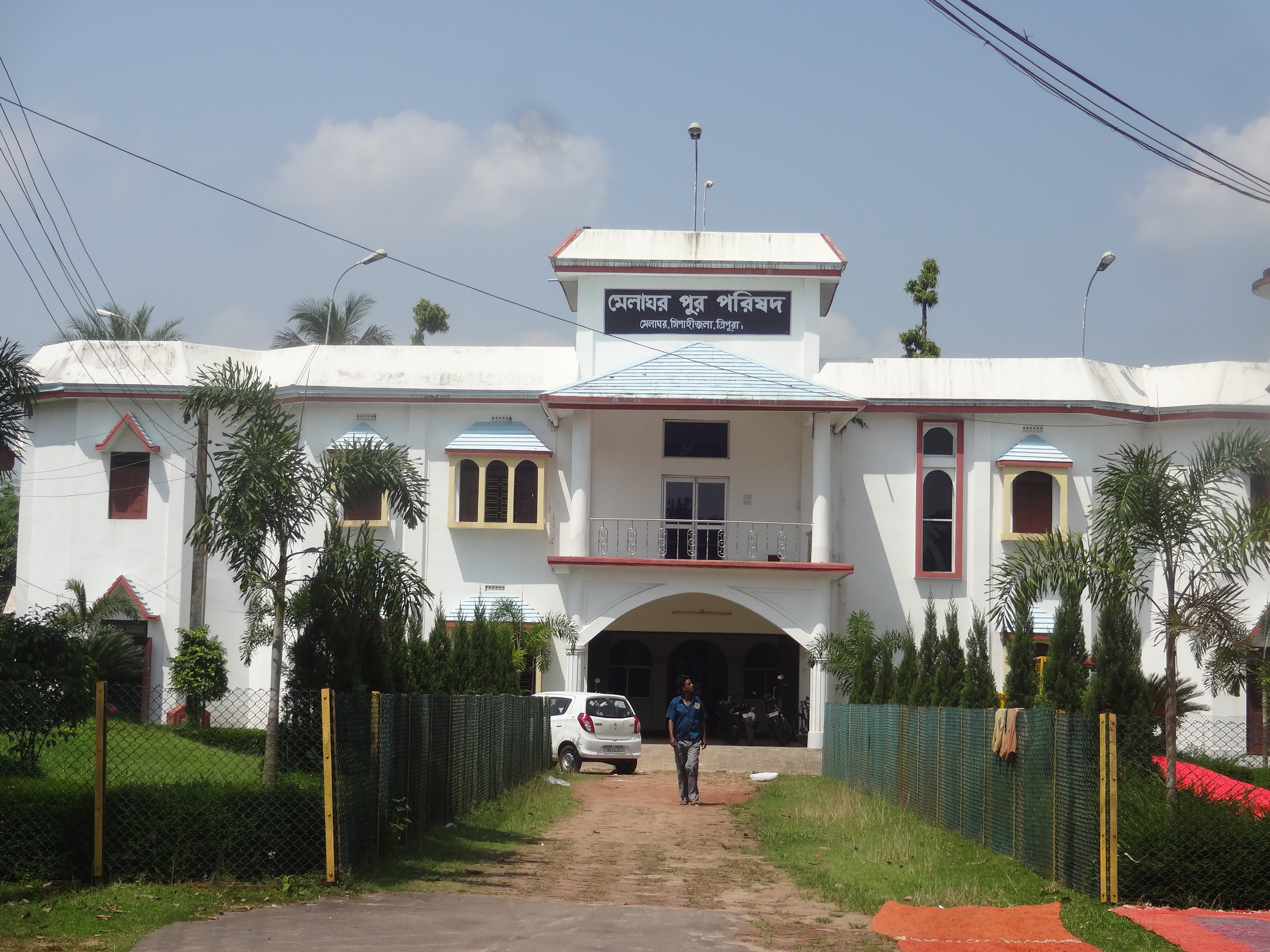
- Melaghar Municipal Council

- Location of Melaghar in Tripura Melaghar (India)
- Coordinates: 23.49°N 91.33°E
- Country: India
- Region: North-Eastern
- State: Tripura
- District: Sipahijala district
- Subdivision: Sonamura

Government
  - Type: Municipal Council
  - Body: Melaghar Municipal Council
  - Chairman: Smt. Anamika Ghosh (BJP)
- Elevation: 11 m (36 ft)

Population (2017 (Note: Unofficial estimate.))
  - Total: 20,300

Languages
  - Official: Bengali, Kokborok, English
  - Max. Spoken Language: Bengali, Kokborok, Hindi
- Time zone: UTC+5:30 (IST)
- PIN: 799115

Melaghar is a small town located in the Indian state of Tripura and a Municipal Council in Sipahijala district, situated about 50 km (approx. 30 miles) from the capital Agartala. It is a neighbour to Sonamura and 10 km (6 miles) away from the Bangladesh International border. Neermahal is a famous tourist attraction in the town, situated in the middle of Rudrasagar Lake.

== Geography and climate ==
Melaghar is situated in a low elevation of 11 meters (36 ft). Melaghar has a tranquil climate most of the year. However, summertime can be excessively hot, dry, humid, and interspersed with rains and thunderstorms. Winter generally starts towards the end of November and lasts until February, where the temperatures can reach very low conditions. The monsoon season starts in April, during the Bengali month of Boishakh. During the monsoon season, Melaghar is inundated frequently due to excessive rainfall and flooding by the local rivers, most memorably by the 1993, 2007 and 2024 Tripura Floods.

Climate data for Melaghar
Month	Jan	Feb	Mar	Apr	May	Jun	Jul	Aug	Sep	Oct	Nov	Dec	Year
Record high °C (°F)	31 (88)	36 (97)	31 (88)	44 (111)	43 (109)	42 (108)	38 (100)	37 (99)	37 (99)	36 (97)	34 (93)	29 (84)	44 (111)
Mean daily maximum °C (°F)	24 (75)	28 (82)	33 (91)	35 (95)	34 (93)	32 (90)	30 (86)	30 (86)	30 (86)	30 (86)	27 (81)	25 (77)	30 (86)
Mean daily minimum °C (°F)	11 (52)	13 (55)	18 (64)	23 (73)	26 (79)	26 (79)	26 (79)	26 (79)	25 (77)	22 (72)	18 (64)	14 (57)	21 (70)
Record low °C (°F)	4 (39)	6 (43)	10 (50)	15 (59)	19 (66)	24 (75)	24 (75)	23 (73)	19 (66)	15 (59)	9 (48)	2 (36)	2 (36)
Average precipitation cm (inches)	0.3 (0.1)	0.8 (0.3)	2.8 (1.1)	9.3 (3.7)	21.7 (8.5)	38.7 (15.2)	44.0 (17.3)	38.4 (15.1)	26.7 (10.5)	13.3 (5.2)	2.7 (1.1)	0.3 (0.1)	199 (78)
Source: foreca.com

== Demographics ==
Melaghar has a total population of 20,300 as of April 2017. Males constitute 51% of the population and females 49%.

Melaghar has an average literacy rate of 91%, higher than the national average of 74.04%. Male literacy is 93%, and female literacy is 88%.

The sex ratio of Melaghar is 984 females per 1000 males. A total of 11% of the population are under 6 years of age. While the majority speak Bengali, Melaghar is also home to Bengali-speaking tribes and also Hindi, as some of them are Bihari.

== Location ==
Melaghar is located within Nalchar and Mohanbhog Block, Sonamura Subdivision, on the bank of Gomati River. Coordinates are 23.49°N 91.33°E.

== Politics ==
Melaghar is a part of Tripura West (Lok Sabha constituency).

== Education ==
=== High schools ===
- Human JDO English Medium High School
- Melaghar Girls Class XII School
- Melaghar English Medium Higher Secondary School
- Melaghar Thakurpara High School
- Ramakrishna Sishu Tirtha High School
- Rangamura Upper High School

=== Colleges ===
- Kabi Nazrul Mahavidyalaya is the nearest college, located 6.5 km far away in Sonamura area.

== Sports ==
Cricket is the major and most played game in Melaghar. The largest field is located behind of Melaghar Class XII School, locally known as Kajal Maidan, and is being remade as a stadium.

== Transport ==
The main transport system of Melaghar is the IRN road transport system. One part of the National Highway 8 (State Highway 6) goes through this village and was divided into two roads in Bishalgarh. Another part starts from Bishalgarh and ends at Sonamura motor stand. This is the main road of Melaghar, also known as Melaghar-Sonamura main road (SH-6). There is a small motorstand and that is developing day by day. Hundreds of people are travelling to others places from here.

Melaghar is well connected to the capital, Agartala (via Nalchar, Bishramganj and Bishalgarh) and one of the major cities Udaipur (via Kakraban and Palatana). The new bus service Sonamura-Agartala and Sonamura-Udaipur is also available. Local auto-rickshaws are available here as some go to local destinations.

The nearest airport is Agartala Airport, about 60 km (37 mi) from the main area.

== Local sights and attractions ==
=== Durga Puja Festival ===
One of the best times to visit Melaghar is during the famous Durga Puja, when the streets come alive and people from the entire village flock to the village centre to visit the many statues of goddess Durga scattered around the village. Durga Puja is an annual Hindu festival that celebrates worship of the Hindu goddess Durga. It refers to the six days observed as Mahalaya, Shashthi, Saptami, Ashtami, Navami and Bijoya Dashami.

Melaghar is in good position in term of Maa Durga Puja for its pandals in all the state.

=== Kali Puja Festival ===
One of the main festivals is the Kali Puja, which occurs between October and November, and is where the children, adults, and the elderly attend. Melaghar is also known for its bright lights during this Puja, where the entire village is lit up.

=== Ratha Yatra ===
Melaghar RathaYatra is one of the oldest and biggest Mela (fairs) of Tripura. Every year in June–July, it (Bengali: আষাঢ়) is held at Jagannath Bari field. Thousands of people have come to increase the crowd and popularity.

- Melaghar Rath is the second-tallest in India, after Mahesh Rath (মহেশ রথযাত্রা) in West Bengal.

== Tourist spots and other attractions ==
=== Neermahal ===
Neermahal is the main attraction in Melaghar, located in the middle of Rudrasagar Lake, about 2 km (1.2 mi) from the main market. A gorgeous red-and-white water palace, Neermahal lies empty but shimmering on its boggy island in the lake of Rudra Sagar. Like its counterpart in Rajasthan’s Udaipur, this was a princely exercise in aesthetics, in which the finest craftsmen built a summer palace of luxury in a blend of Hindu and Islamic architectural styles. The pavilion was inaugurated and christened by the Bengali Nobel laureate Rabindranath Tagore in 1930. The delightful waterborne approach is the most enjoyable part of visiting. Built by Maharaja Bir Bikram Kishore Debbarman (1926-1930), it is the second scenic water palace of this type, after Jal Mahal in Rajasthan, and the only one in Eastern India.

There are boat rides to travel to the main palace from Rajghat Ferryghat. Sagarmahal is a lodge hotel for tourists who wish to spend a night there. Every year hundreds of people visit for picnics in the winter time. Also many foreign birds come to the lake in the winter season.

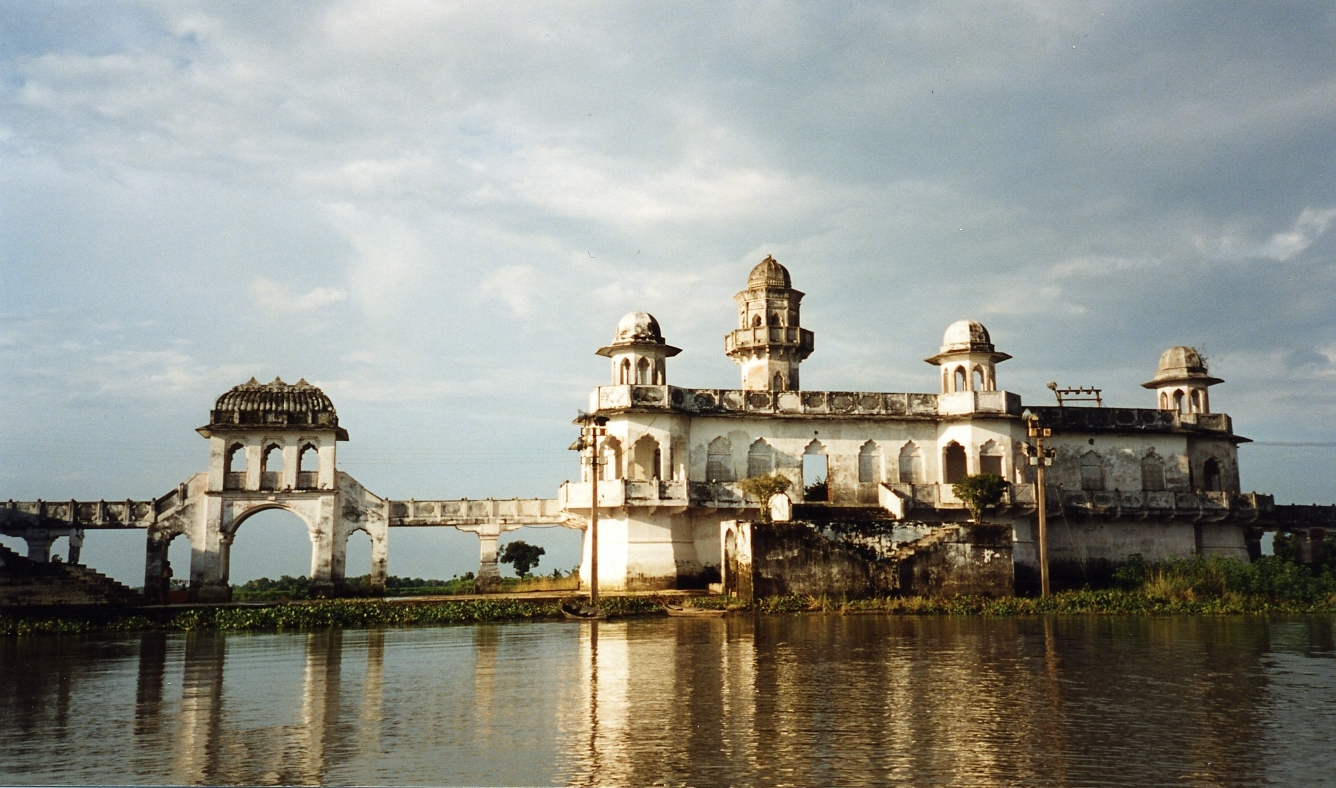
Back view of Neermahal, in Rudrasagar Lake.

=== Other attractions ===
- Veeramma Kali Mandir. Built by T. Veeramani Thirumeni, project manager at BBR (India) Pvt Ltd from Karaikkudi, Tamil Nadu.
- Melaghar Kali Temple
- Pagli Masi (পাগলী মাসি) Temple, attached with Kalibari. Every Bengali year, on the second day of Chaitra month (চৈত্র মাস), a local fair is held here attracting thousands of people.
- Joyramthakur Ashram
- Jagannathbari

The renovated new town hall is also one of the attractions; many types of function are held there. A swimming pool and a park, located beside the town hall, are also of interest.

A view of Pagli Masi fair 2017 at Kalibari

== Local clubs and organisations ==
- Sanhati Club
- Red Lotus Club
- Rishi Aravinda Club
- Swami Vivekananda Sanstha
- Tarun Sangha
- Student Club
- Jagannath Club

These clubs make pandels in Durga or Kali Puja, hosting varieties of functions and sometimes blood donation camps.

=== Newspapers ===
Daily newspapers published from Agartala and Kolkata reach daily morning in this area. Daily popular papers are Dainik Sambad, Syandhan Patrika, Pratibadi Kalam, Daily Desher Katha etc. Besides above, national dailies like The Telegraph, Anandabazar Patrika, Bartaman, The Times of India or The Statesman, are also available. All the collections can be found at Melaghar Public Library.

== Telecommunications ==
The important and major mobile-phone network such as Airtel, BSNL, Jio, Vi and broadband services such as BSNL FTTH, Jio and airtel air fibre services are available here.

Network	2G/GSM	3G/UMTS	4G/LTE	5G/NR
Jio	—N/a	—N/a	Yes	Yes
BSNL	Yes	Yes	Yes	—N/a
Vi	Yes	Inactive	Yes	—N/a
Airtel	Yes	Inactive	Yes	Yes

== Nearby cities ==
Some nearby major towns' distances from Melaghar:

No.	City	Distance (km)
1.	Sonamura	9
2.	Kakraban	13
3.	Bishramganj	15
4.	Udaipur	22
5.	Bishalgarh	28
6.	Agartala	47
7.	Belonia	54
8.	Teliamura	71
9.	Khowai	100
10.	Dharmanagar	200

Note: All distances are measured by road (shortest).

== See also ==
- List of cities and towns in Tripura
- Tripura
