= Mohanpur, Tripura =

Town in Tripura, India

Mohonpur
- Mohanpur

- Location within Tripura Location within India
- Coordinates: 23.58°N 91.22°E
- Country: India
- State: Tripura
- District: West Tripura
- Legislative Assembly: Tripura Legislative Assembly

Government
  - Type: Municipal Council
  - Chairman: Sri Motilal Das
  - MLA: Ratan Lal Nath

Area
  - City: 884 ha (2,180 acres)
- Elevation: 45 m (148 ft)

Population (2011)
  - City: 16,363
  - Rank: 10th
  - Urban: 11,325

Languages
  - Official: Bengali, English
- Time zone: UTC+5:30 (IST)
- PIN: 799211
- Area code: 0381
- Vehicle registration: TR 01 XX YYYY

Mohanpur is a Municipal Council in Tripura, northeast India. It is the 10th largest town in the state and a subdivision of West Tripura district.

Mohanpur subdivision has a total of 30 village panchayats, among them Anangnagar is the most populated followed by Vijaynagar, brahmakunda, debendranagar.

== Demographics ==
According to the 2011 census data, the total population of Mohanpur is 16,363. The number of males is 8,434 and the number of females is 7,929 Most of the population is urban with a number of 11,325, as well as, more than 5,050 people are from rural areas. Mohanpur had an average literacy rate of 80.43%, higher than the national average of 59.5%. The male literacy rate is 83.53% and female literacy rate is 77.13%.

== Forest ==
In the subdivision of Mohanpur there is a total of 73.869 km^{2} of forest land in which 73.869 km^{2} is Reserved forest .

== Transportation ==
The main transport system of the town is dependent on roadways. Mohanpur Road and Assam Agartala Road are the main roads. The town does not have any railway stations; the nearest railway station is at Jogendranagar. The distance of the town from the capital Agartala is about 23 km.

== Education ==
- Schools
1. MOHANPUR CLASS XII SCHOOL
2. MOHANPUR GIRLS' H.S. SCHOOL
3. TARAPUR HIGH SCHOOL
4. MOHANPUR TEA GARDEN J.B SCHOOL
5. GANDHIGRAM H.S. SCHOOL
- Colleges

Swami Vivekananda Mahavidyalaya
