= List of cities in Tripura by population =

Tripura is a state in Northeast India. The third-smallest state in the country, it covers 10,491.69 km^{2} (4,050.86 sq mi) and is bordered by Bangladesh (East Bengal) to the north, south, and west, and the Indian states of Assam and Mizoram to the east. In 2011 the state had 3,671,032 residents, constituting 0.3% of the country's population. Native Tripuri people form about 30 per cent of Tripura's population. The Bengali people form the ethno-linguistic majority in Tripura. The entire work of this article is based on Census of India, conducted by "The Office of the Registrar General and Census Commissioner, India" under Ministry of Home Affairs, Government of India. According to the data from the Census of 2011, there are 8 districts, 23 sub-divisions and 20 municipal towns in the state of Tripura. There is only one city in this state with a Municipal Corporation - Agartala and thirteen towns with Municipal Council as per latest data.

== List ==
No.	Town	Class	Sub-division	District	Population	Municipal Wards
1.	Agartala	Municipal Corporation	Sadar	West Tripura	522,613	51
2.	Dharmanagar	Municipal Council	Dharmanagar	North Tripura	45,887	25
3.	Udaipur	Municipal Council	Udaipur	Gomati	37,781	23
4.	Kailashahar	Municipal Council	Kailasahar	Unakoti	23,418	17
5.	Bishalgarh	Municipal Council	Bishalgarh	Sipahijala	22,309	15
6.	Teliamura	Municipal Council	Teliamura	Khowai	21,679	15
7.	Khowai	Municipal Council	Khowai	Khowai	21,387	15
8.	Belonia	Municipal Council	Belonia	South Tripura	21,176	17
9.	Melaghar	Municipal Council	Sonamura	Sipahijala	19,714	13
10.	Mohanpur	Municipal Council	Mohanpur	West Tripura	18,549	15
11.	Ambassa	Municipal Council	Ambassa	Dhalai	16,407	15
12.	Ranirbazar	Municipal Council	Sadar	West Tripura	15,820	13
13.	Santirbazar	Municipal Council	Santirbazar	South Tripura	15,647	15
14.	Kumarghat	Municipal Council	Kumarghat	Unakoti	15,189	15
15.	Sonamura	Nagar Panchayat	Sonamura	Sipahijala	12,592	13
16.	Panisagar	Nagar Panchayat	Panisagar	North Tripura	11,938	13
17.	Amarpur	Nagar Panchayat	Amarpur	Gomati	11,525	13
18.	Jirania	Nagar Panchayat	Jirania	West Tripura	11,023	11
19.	Kamalpur	Nagar Panchayat	Kamalpur	Dhalai	10,904	11
20.	Sabroom	Nagar Panchayat	Sabroom	South Tripura	6,034	9

== See also ==
- List of districts of Tripura
- Tripura
- List of cities In India by population
- List of cities In India by area
