= Jirania railway station =

Railway station in Tripura, India

Jirania Railway Station

General information
- Location: Bankimnagar, Jirania, Agartala, West Tripura, Tripura; India
- Coordinates: 23.8279021°N 91.4287257°E
- Elevation: 39 m (128 ft)
- System: Indian Railways station Regional rail, Light rail
- Owner: Indian Railways
- Operator: Northeast Frontier Railway
- Line: Lumding–Sabroom section
- Platforms: 3
- Tracks: 3
- Connections: Auto rickshaw

Construction
- Structure type: Standard (on-ground station)
- Parking: Available

Other information
- Status: Functioning, Multiple Diesel-Line
- Station code: JRNA
- Zone(s): Northeast Frontier Railway zone
- Division(s): Lumding

History
- Opened: 2008; 18 years ago
- Rebuilt: 2016; 10 years ago

Services
Preceding station	Indian Railways	Following station
Jogendranagar towards ?	Northeast Frontier Railway zone Lumding–Sabroom section	Teliamura towards ?
Location
- Location within Tripura

Jirania Railway Station is located at Jirania in Tripura, India. It is an Indian railway station of the Lumding–Sabroom line in the Northeast Frontier Railway zone of Indian Railways. The station is situated at Jirania in West Tripura district in the Indian state of Tripura. Total 8 Passengers trains halt in the station.

== History ==
Jirania railway station became operation in 2008 with the meter gauge line from Lumding to Agartala but later in 2016 entire section converted into broad-gauge line.

== Details ==
The station lies on the 312 km-long 1,676 mm (5 ft 6 in) broad-gauge Lumding–Sabroom railway line which comes under the Lumding railway division of the Northeast Frontier Railway zone of Indian Railways. It is a single line without electrification.

== Services ==
- 2 trains per day run between Agartala and Dharmanagar. The train stops at Jirania station.
- 1 trains per day run between Agartala and Silchar. The train stops at Jirania station.

== Station layout ==
G	Street level	Exit/Entrance & Ticket counter
P1	FOB, Side platform, No-1 doors will open on the left/right
P1	Track 1
P1	Track 2	toward →
P1	Track 3	toward →
P1	FOB, Island platform, No- 2 doors will open on the left/right
P1	Island platform, No- 3 doors will open on the left/right
Track 4	Under Construction
