= Mohanbhog, Tripura =

Village in Tripura, India

Mohanbhog
- Village
- Location within Tripura
- Coordinates: 23.506°N 91.389°E
- Country: India
- State: Tripura
- District: Sepahijala district
- Sub-division: Sonamura
- Local Language: Bengali, Kokborok

Population (2011)
  - Total: 4,829
- Time zone: UTC+05:30 (IST)
- PIN: 799105
- ISO 3166 code: IN-TR
- Website: tripura.gov.in

Mohanbhog is a village located in the Indian state of Tripura in Sipahijala district. As of 2011 census, Mohanbhog had a population of 4,829. 2,457 people are male. 2,372 are female.

== See also ==
- List of cities and towns in Tripura
