= Krishna Kishorenagar =

- Village
- Interactive map of Krishna Kishorenagar
- Country: India
- State: Tripura
- District: West Tripura
- Sub-district: Bishalgarh

Population (2011)
  - Total: 9,244
- Time zone: UTC+05:30 (IST)
- ISO 3166 code: IN-TR
- Website: tripura.gov.in

Krishna Kishorenagar is a village in West Tripura District, Tripura, India. The population is 9,244. 4,791 people are male. 4,453 are female.
