= Gakulnagar =

- Census town
- Interactive map of Gakulnagar
- Coordinates: 23.718°N 91.265°E
- Country: India
- State: Tripura
- District: West Tripura

Population (2001)
  - Total: 9,037

Languages
  - Official: Bengali, Kokborok, English
- Time zone: UTC+5:30 (IST)
- Vehicle registration: TR
- Website: tripura.gov.in

Gakulnagar is a census town in West Tripura district in the state of Tripura, India.

== Demographics ==
As of 2001 India census, Gakulnagar had a population of 9037. Males constitute 54% of the population and females 46%. Gakulnagar has an average literacy rate of 66%, higher than the national average of 59.5%: male literacy is 73%, and female literacy is 57%. In Gakulnagar, 15% of the population is under 6 years of age.
