= IXN =

IXN may refer to:

- the abbreviation for isoxanthohumol, a prenylated flavanone
- the IATA code for Khowai Airport, India
