= Brajapur =

Coordinates: 23°26′N 85°52′E

- Village
- Interactive map of Brajapur
- Country: India
- State: Tripura
- District: West Tripura
- Sub-district: Bishalgarh

Population (2011)
  - Total: 8,477
- Time zone: UTC+05:30 (IST)
- ISO 3166 code: IN-TR
- Website: tripura.gov.in

Brajapur is a village in West Tripura District, Tripura, India. The population is 8,477. 4,303 people are male. 4,174 are female. Pin Code of Brajapur is 799102 which comes under agartala postal division (Shillong HQ Region)
