= Paharmura =

Coordinates: 24.073°N 91.592°E

Paharmura Paharmora
- Paharmura
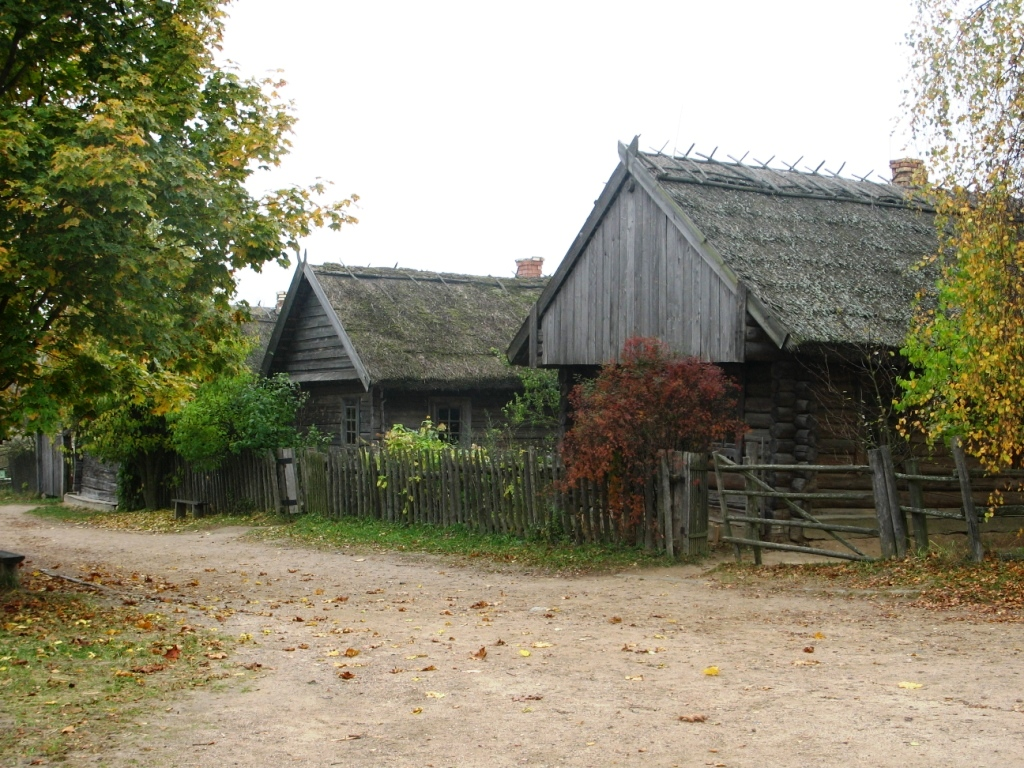

Population
  - Total: 2,761

Paharmura is a village in the Khowai district of Tripura state of India.

== Details ==
According to the Census 201, the location code or village code of Paharmura is 271908. The village is 5 km away from sub-district headquarter Khowai and 85 km away from district headquarter Agartala.

The total area of Paharmura is 220 hectares. Paharmura has a total population of 2,761 peoples. There are about 648 houses in Paharmura village. Khowai is the nearest town to Paharmura, approximately 2 km away .

Current Local Government

Paharmura Gram Panchayat, located in Paharmura, Khowai, Tripura, is presently governed by the Bharatiya Janata Party (BJP). In the most recent local elections, all 9 seats were uncontested, resulting in a clean sweep for the BJP, with no opposition candidates in the fray. The Gram Pradhan, Nabanita Sarkar Biswas, oversees local governance, development initiatives, and the implementation of government schemes. Under her leadership, the Panchayat is focused on various development projects aimed at enhancing the quality of life for the residents of Paharmura.Administration

== Schools in Paharmura ==
- Paharmura Higher secondary school
