= Laxmibil =

- Village
- Interactive map of Laxmibil
- Country: India
- State: Tripura
- District: West Tripura
- Sub-district: Bishalgarh

Population (2011)
  - Total: 6,984
- Time zone: UTC+05:30 (IST)
- ISO 3166 code: IN-TR
- Website: tripura.gov.in

Laxmibil is a village located in the West Tripura District, Tripura, India. The population is 6,684. 3,521 people are male. 3,163 are female.
