= Ganki, Tripura =

Ganki
- Location in Tripura
- Coordinates: 24.058°N 91.632°E
- Country: India
- State: Tripura
- District: Khowai district

Population (2011)
  - Total: 13,524

Languages
  - Official: Bengali, Kokborok
- Time zone: UTC+5:30 (IST)

Ganki is a village in Khowai district of Tripura state of India.

== See also ==
- Khowai district
