= Uttar Charilam =

- Village
- Interactive map of Uttar Charilam
- Country: India
- State: Tripura
- District: West Tripura
- Sub-district: Bishalgarh

Population (2011)
  - Total: 10,793
- Time zone: UTC+05:30 (IST)
- ISO 3166 code: IN-TR
- Website: tripura.gov.in

Uttar Charilam is a village in West Tripura District, Tripura, India. The population is 10,793. 5,516 people are male. 5,277 are female.
