= Riya Shukla =

Indian actress

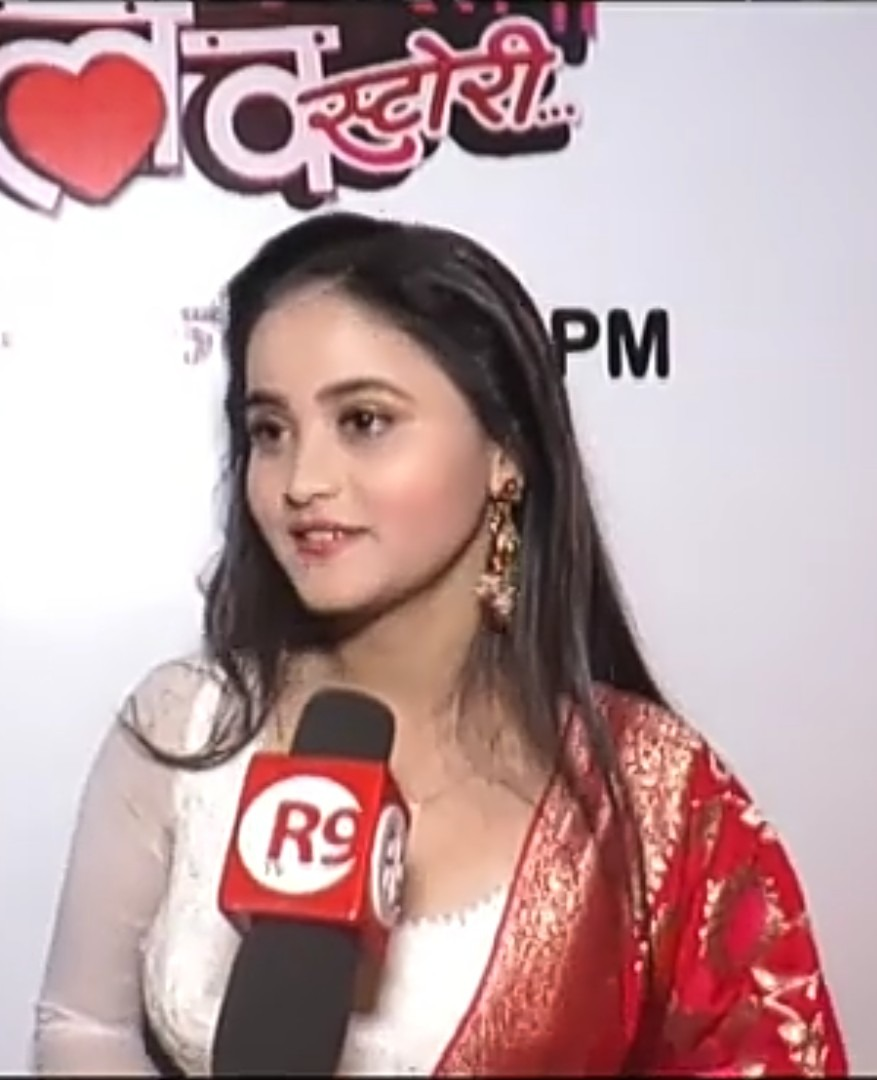
- Shukla in 2020
- Born: Riya Shukla; 1 January 2000 (age 26); Indranagar, Lucknow, Uttar Pradesh India
- Occupations: Actress; Model
- Years active: 2015–2020
- Known for: Naati Pinky Ki Lambi Love Story

Riya Shukla is an Indian actress. She made her film debut with Nil Battey Sannata, garnering her the Star Screen Awards best child artist award and was also nominated for Best female debut at Zee Cine Award. In 2020, she was seen as the lead Lavanya "Pinky" Kashyap/Bhardwaj in Colors TV's Naati Pinky Ki Lambi Love Story.

== Early life and education ==
Riya was born on 1 January 1998, hails from Indranagar, Lucknow, Uttar Pradesh, and completed her education from M.K.S.D. inter College, Lucknow.

== Career ==
Riya entered the entertainment world as a contestant with reality TV show Hindustan Ke Hunarbaaz.

In 2015, she made her film debut with Nil Battey Sannata as Appu. For this role she won best child artist at Star Screen Award. She also appeared in the films Hichki and 3rd Eye.

From 2020, was the lead character Lavanya "Pinky Kashyap/Bhardwaj" in Naati Pinky Ki Lambi Love Story. She also appeared in Netflix thriller Raat Akeli Hai as Chunni.

== Filmography ==
=== Television ===
Year	show	Role	Channel	Notes
2020	Naati Pinky Ki Lambi Love Story	Lavanya Kashyap	Colors TV	Lead role

=== Films ===
Year	Film	Notes
2015	Nil Battey Sannata	Star Screen Award Best Child artist
2017	Butterflies and hurricanes	Short Film
2018	Hichki	
2019	3rd Eye	
2020	Raat Akeli Hai	Chunni
