= Paschim Singhichhara =

- Location in Tripura
- Coordinates: 24.079°N 91.623°E
- Country: India
- State: Tripura
- District: Khowai district

Population (2011)
  - Total: 11,127

Languages
  - Official: Kokborok, Bengali
- Time zone: UTC+5:30 (IST)

Paschim Singhichhara is a village in Khowai district of Tripura state of India.

== See also ==
- Khowai district
