= Kadhalikka Neramillai (2025 film) =

2025 Indian film

- Theatrical release poster
- Directed by: Kiruthiga Udhayanidhi
- Written by: Kiruthiga Udhayanidhi
- Produced by: Udhayanidhi Stalin
- Starring: Ravi Mohan; Nithya Menen
- Cinematography: Gavemic U. Ary
- Edited by: Lawrence Kishore
- Music by: A. R. Rahman
- Production company: Red Giant Movies
- Distributed by: Red Giant Movies; Ayngaran International
- Release date: 14 January 2025
- Running time: 143 minutes
- Country: India
- Language: Tamil
- Box office: ₹ est.18 crore

Kadhalikka Neramillai (transl. No Time to Love) is a 2025 Indian Tamil-language romantic comedy film written and directed by Kiruthiga Udhayanidhi. It is produced by Udhayanidhi Stalin under Red Giant Movies. The film stars Ravi Mohan and Nithya Menen in the lead roles, alongside Vinay Rai, Yogi Babu, T.J. Bhanu and Lal. It is loosely inspired from the 2010 American romantic comedy The Switch.

The film was officially announced in November 2023. Principal photography commenced the same month. It was predominantly shot in Chennai and wrapped by late-May 2024. The film has music composed by A. R. Rahman, cinematography handled by Gavemic U. Ary and editing by Lawrence Kishore.

Kadhalikka Neramillai released in theatres on 14 January 2025 and received mixed to positive reviews from critics.

== Plot ==
In 2017, Chennai-based architect Shriya defies her conservative parents' wishes by register-marrying her lover, Karan. However, she soon discovers Karan's infidelity and ends their relationship. Shriya, desiring motherhood, decides to undergo In vitro fertilisation (IVF) with the support of her cousin, Ashwini. This decision leads to a rift with her mother, who disowns her. Meanwhile, in Bengaluru, structural engineer Siddharth "Sid" is in a relationship with model Nirupama. After a stressful work period, Sid, along with friends Sethuraman "Sethu" and Gowda, decide to freeze their sperm. Sid provides a pseudonym, P. James, and incorrect contact information to maintain anonymity.

A mix-up at the hospital leads to Sid's sperm being used for IVF. Unbeknownst to Sid, his sperm is used to impregnate Shriya. As Sid's relationship with Nirupama becomes strained due to his reluctance to have children, while Shriya becomes curious about her sperm donor, P. James. With Ashwini's help, she tracks down the donor's details and travels to Bengaluru. At a seminar, Sid is impressed by Shriya, unaware of their connection. Later, Shriya meets Sid and his friends while searching for P. James. As they grow closer, Shriya leaves instantly, returning to Chennai. Shriya soon gives birth to a baby boy.

Eight years later, Sid arrives in Chennai to secure a project for his company and coincidentally meets Shriya and her 8-year-old son, Parthiv. Sid accommodates in the same apartment building as Shriya, her aunt, and Parthiv. As fate would have it, Sid and Shriya are rival representatives competing for the same project. Parthiv, an angry young boy, repeatedly questions Shriya about his father. Parthiv desperately attempts to find his father, goes missing, but Sid helps rescue him. Sid and Parthiv strongly bond, particularly over their shared passion for football. Sid, a former football enthusiast, begins coaching Parthiv. Meanwhile, Shriya's neighbor, Vivek, harbors feelings for her, but she doesn't reciprocate. During a road trip to Bengaluru for a meeting, Sid, Shriya, and Parthiv grow closer. Parthiv also forms a connection with Sid's father.

Surprisingly, Gowda reunites Sid with Nirupama, who is now filled with guilt for leaving him. She asks Sid to rekindle their relationship and requests to stay in his flat, to which he reluctantly agrees. Shriya becomes possessive upon Nirupama's return, but soon, Nirupama realizes that Sid's heart belongs to Shriya. Recognizing this, Nirupama graciously exits Sid's life. As Sid's company announces their impending project win, Shriya mistakenly accuses Sid of sabotaging her quotation to secure the project for his company, at Parthiv's birthday party. However, the truth reveals that Sid had actually recommended Shriya's quote, resulting in his termination from the company. At Parthiv's football match, Shriya apologizes for her misunderstanding. Sid responds graciously, thanking her for inspiring him to quit his job and pursue his long-planned startup.

As they reconcile, Sid proposes to Shriya, and she happily accepts. Meanwhile, Sethu ties the knot with his partner and welcomes a child using his frozen sperm. Sethu reveals that the hospital had misplaced their sperm samples, but Sid's sperm had already been used for Shriya's IVF treatment. Finally, Sid, Shriya and Parthiv embark on a new journey together, unaware of the profound connection between them.

== Cast ==
- Ravi Mohan as Siddharth "Sid"
- Nithya Menen as Shriya Chandramohan
- Vinay Rai as Sethuraman "Sethu"
- Yogi Babu as Gowda
- T. J. Bhanu as Nirupama
- John Kokken as Karan
- Lal as Sid's father
- Lakshmy Ramakrishnan as Kanmani, Shreya’s mother
- Mano as Chandramohan, Shreya’s father
- Vinodhini Vaidyanathan as Jalaja, Shreya’s aunt
- Rohaan Singh as Parthiv
- Vivek R Venkatram as Inspector Gandhi
- Raj Ayyappa as Vivek, Shreya's neighbour
- Lizzie Antony as a Physician
- Vidyullekha Raman as a Receptionist
- Swetha Venkit as Ashwini, Shreya's cousin
- Abdool Lee as Naveen, Sid's colleague
- Praveen Kumar as Shreya’s boss
- Gaayathri Krishnan as Nirupama's mother
- Soundarya Saravanan as Parthiv's teacher
- RJ Saru as Charu
- Prem Jacob as Sethu's partner

== Production ==
=== Development ===
Director Kiruthiga Udhayanidhi revealed that the inspiration for Kadhalikka Neramillai stemmed from a conversation with friends about their unconventional relationships. This sparked the idea for a romantic comedy-drama reflecting the evolving dynamics of relationships and choices, particularly those relevant to women.

In May 2023, reports indicated that Jayam Ravi would collaborate with Nithya Menen in a film directed by Kiruthiga Udhayanidhi. The project was funded by Udhayanidhi Stalin's production house, Red Giant Movies. In October 2023, Menen confirmed her involvement in the project, followed by an official announcement and title reveal on November 29, 2023.

Kiruthiga described the film as an evolution of O Kadhal Kanmani, which also featured Nithya Menen. She stated, “Several women are not just abstaining from marriage, but are also questioning whether to bring a child into this world. We explore these subjects without being preachy.”

=== Casting ===
After completing the script, Kiruthiga envisioned Nithya Menen for the lead role, influenced by her performance in Thiruchitrambalam. After narrating the story to Nithya, she readily agreed. Kiruthiga then informed Ravi Mohan of Menen's agreement, and he expressed his willingness to read the script.

=== Filming ===
The film commenced with a formal pooja on August 20, 2023, followed by the start of principal photography on August 21, 2023, which took place in and around Chennai. In March 2024, the team filmed a scene where Nithya Menen and Ravi's characters reunite after a long separation, reminiscing about their previous meeting.

The film's production was completed on May 28, 2024.

The movie was granted its censor clearance by the CBFC on January 9, 2025, with a UA 16+ certification. The movie's runtime is specified as 2h 22m.

== Music ==
Kadhalikka Neramillai

Soundtrack album by A. R. Rahman
- Genre: Feature film soundtrack
- Language: Tamil
- Label: T-Series
- Producer: A. R. Rahman

A. R. Rahman chronology
| Raayan (2024) | Kadhalikka Neramillai (2025) | Chhaava (2025) |

Singles from Kadhalikka Neramillai
- 1. "Yennai Izhukkuthadi" Released: 22 November 2024; 2. "Lavender Neramae" Released: 18 December 2024; 3. "It's A Break Up Da" Released: 4 January 2025; 4. "Baby Chiki Chiki" Released: 7 January 2025

External audio
- Kadhalikka Neramillai Audio Jukebox on YouTube

The soundtrack and background score is composed by A. R. Rahman. The first single "Yennai Izhukkuthadi" released on 22 November 2024. The second single "Lavender Neramae" released on 18 December 2024. The third single "It's A Break Up Da" is set to be released on 4 January 2025. The entire soundtrack album was released on 7 January 2025. The fourth single "Baby Chiki Chiki" released on 7 January 2025.

Track listing
| No. | Title | Lyrics | Singer(s) | Length |
|---|---|---|---|---|
| 1. | "Yennai Izhukkuthadi" | Vivek | A. R. Rahman, Dhee | 4:05 |
| 2. | "Lavender Neramae" | Mashook Rahman | Adithya RK, Alexandra Joy | 4:01 |
| 3. | "It's A Break Up Da" | Snehan | Shruti Haasan, Adithya RK | 3.36 |
| 4. | "Muevelo" | Vivek, thoughtsfornow | A. R. Ameen, Shuba | 3:32 |
| 5. | "Baby Chiki Chiki" | Krithika Nelson | Shreya Ghoshal | 4:00 |

== Release ==
=== Theatrical ===
Kadhalikka Neramillai released in theatres on 14 January 2025, coinciding Pongal weekend. The movie was granted its censor clearance by the Central Board of Film Certification on 9 January 2025.

=== Home media ===
The film began streaming on Netflix from 11 February 2025.

== Reception ==
=== Critical response ===
Avinash Ramachandran of The Indian Express gave 3.5/5 stars and wrote "Kadhalikka Neramillai is a simple, sensitive, and sensible film that accepts the flaws of its characters as par for the course. [...] it reminds us how despite all odds… love will always find time to find a way." Harshini SV of The Times of India gave 3/5 stars and wrote "But the boldest of all is in the writing of Kiruthiga which gets a little predictable in between but takes an interesting turn, especially towards the end of the film—for like its characters, the writing too is flawed but breezy and bold!" Narayani M of Cinema Express gave 3/5 stars and wrote "It is a film that dares to take its audience on a familiar yet revamped route, towards a new and interesting space that might not suit everyone’s idea of a destination, one that is not bound by the confines of societal expectations or time."

Janani K of India Today gave 2.5/5 stars and wrote "Kiruthiga Udhayanidhi’s film resorts to clichés with a triangle love story and some redundant messaging in the second half. This is where Kadhalikka Neramillai failed to stand out from other rom-coms." Anusha Sundar of OTTPlay gave 2.5/5 stars and wrote "Kadhalikka Neramillai attempts to talk a modern love story, one where the couple are beyond their honeymoon phase of getting along. But in turn becomes a flatline narrative that does not explore issues in detail."

Gopinath Rajendran of The Hindu wrote "Despite its fair share of shortcomings, Kadhalikka Neramillai is a sweet breath of fresh air that plays to its strengths and, in a way, embodies contemporary relationships." Latha Srinivasan of Hindustan Times wrote "Ravi Mohan and Nithya Menen share great screen chemistry and their performances are beautiful [...] Director Kiruthiga Udhayanidhi’s directorial skills have definitely evolved with her films over the years and Kadhalikka Neramillai is perhaps one of her best works. "
