= Rudrasagar Lake =

- Twijilikma (Kok Borok)
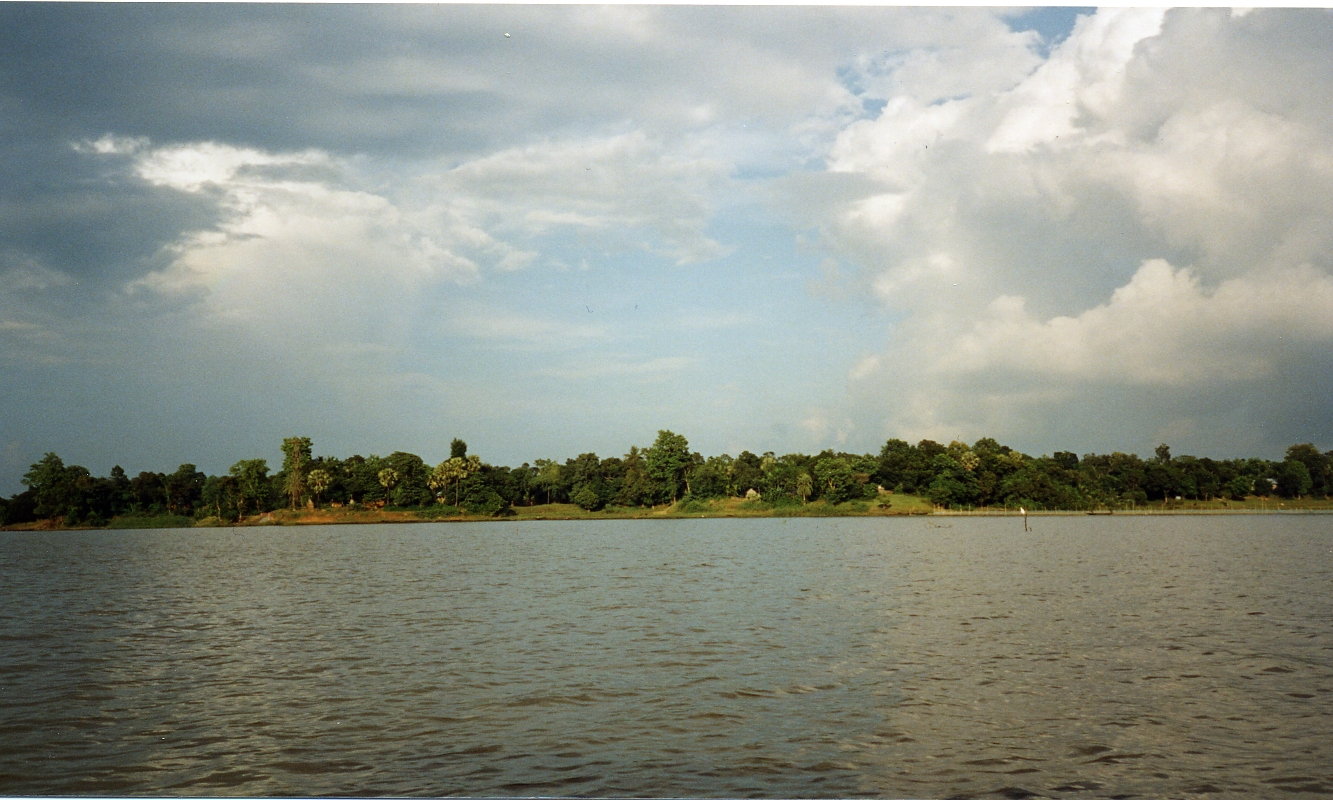

- Location within India
- Location: Melaghar, Tripura, India
- Coordinates: 23.504°N 91.315°E
- Type: lake

Designations

Ramsar Wetland
- Designated: 8 November 2005
- Reference no.: 1572

Rudrasagar Lake, also known as Twijilikma, is a lake located in Melaghar, Tripura, India.

The Government of India's Ministry of Environment, Forest and Climate Change has identified Rudrasagar as one of the wetlands of National Importance for conservation and sustainable use based on its bio-diversity and socio economic importance. The secretary general of the Ramsar Convention has declared Rudrasagar Lake as a wetland of international importance. This certificate was communicated by Ministry of Environment and Forests, Govt. of India on 29 February 2007.

== Geography ==
The Rudrasagar Lake is located in the Melaghar block of Sonamura sub-division of Sipahijala district. The lake forms a geographical area of 5.3 km^{2} and is situated at a distance of about 52 km from the state capital of Tripura. The lake is situated in between 23°29’ N and 90°01’ E.

Hydromorphologically, Rudrasagar Lake is a natural sedimentation reservoir, which receives flow from three perennial streams namely, Noacherra, Durlavnaraya cherra and Kemtali cherra. After settling the sediment from the received flow, clear water discharges into the river Gumati through a connective channel namely Kachigang. The lake bed has been formed by silt deposition. As such no rock formation is found with 50 m is silt (clay loam) and below formation is sandy. Surrounding hillocks are of soft sedimentary formation. Annual rainfall is around 2,500 mm, spread over the months of June to September with four or five flood peaks. Substantial base flow in streams rounds the year. The soil in lake area is silty clay loam to clay loam. Lake water is fresh with insignificant pollution with depth varying from 2 to 9 m. Fluctuation in water level varies from 9 to 16 m. The downstream area of the lake is 750 ha with a temperature variation from 37 °C to 50 °C and rainfall during 15 May to 15 October.

Rudrasagar is a potential Important Bird Area and attracts a large number of waterfowl in winter. Among the rarer species recorded are the endangered Baer's pochard and near-threatened ferruginous duck.

== Pollution ==
The lake has faced the problem of pollution due to the following reasons.

- The non-point sources of pollutant such as agricultural run off, anthropogenic introduced solid and semisolid pollutants
- Malpractices such as anthropogenic dumped garbage, deposition of solid waste and construction materials along the shoreline etc.
- Eutrophication, an uncontrolled growth of alien invasive species such as water hyacinth, excessive algae was observed in the lake which caused loss of aquatic biodiversity.
- Agricultural activity (use of pesticides and fertilizers) in the area adjacent to the lake
- Deforestation, filling, draining and degradation of wetland areas: Clearing and removal of native vegetation due to the rapid unplanned urbanization, rural or industrial development
- Lack of awareness, scientific knowledge and negligence in protection by law
- Competition for using lake water such as for drinking, irrigation, fishing etc.
- Untreated or inadequately treated domestic and industrial effluents from point sources located all over the basin.
- Cultural siltation in the form of immersion of idols during specific festivals, an annual feature in India, has been a source of serious metallic pollution of lakes.
- Not having a definite Wetland Authority, Special Purpose Vehicles (SPVs) for Lake Management and conservation with a unified mandate have not been set up.
- Lack of community toilet facilities around periphery of the lake.
- Ownership and legal status of the lake and the inhabitants around the lake are not clearly defined.

Major soil erosion in catchment area of the lake is one of the major problems to decrease the lake area and to decrease the depth of the lake also. Such degradation in catchment area and siltation in the lake has the effect since long time in the lake. For such reason and others, the area of Rudrasagar Lake has been decreased drastically from 1000 ha. Prior to 1950 to more or less 100 ha. at present. Silting of lakes on account of increased erosion as a result of expansion of urban and agricultural areas, deforestation, flood, immersion of idols by the religious activity and such other land disturbances taking place in the drainage basin of the lake.

== Neermahal ==
A palace known as Neermahal (Water Palace) is situated near the north-east bank of the lake. It constructed by the then Tripura King Maharaja Bir Bikram Kishore Manikya Bahadur in between 1935 and 1938 as summer resort.
