= Amma Kanakku =

2016 Indian film by Ashwiny Iyer Tiwari

- Theatrical release poster
- Directed by: Ashwiny Iyer Tiwari
- Produced by: Anand L. Rai; Dhanush
- Starring: Amala Paul; Revathi; Yuva Lakshmi; P. Samuthirakani
- Cinematography: Gavemic U. Ary
- Edited by: Raja Mohammad
- Music by: Ilaiyaraaja
- Production companies: Colour Yellow Pictures; Wunderbar Films
- Release date: 24 June 2016
- Running time: 110 minutes
- Country: India
- Language: Tamil

Amma Kanakku (transl. Mother's calculations) is a 2016 Indian Tamil-language comedy drama film written and directed by Ashwiny Iyer Tiwari and produced by Anand L. Rai and Dhanush. A remake of the director's Hindi film Nil Battey Sannata (2015), it stars Amala Paul, Revathi, Yuva Lakshmi, and P. Samuthirakani in the lead roles. Principal photography commenced on 7 January 2016 and wrapped in late February 2016. The film was released on 24 June 2016.

== Plot ==
A young, widowed, high school drop-out mother, Shanti (Amala Paul) is employed as a servant in Dr. Nandhini's (Revathi) house where she is treated as part of the family. Shanti works in several other places to supplement her monthly income so that she can provide a better life for her daughter Abhinaya (Yuva Lakshmi). However, Abhinaya is not interested in her studies and loves to chat with her friends, watch TV, and play.

One day, Abhinaya conveys to her mother that her ambition in life is to become a servant as well. Shanti is dismayed hearing this and conveys this to her boss, who in turn advises her to challenge her daughter. Shanti realises that if she were more educated, she would be able to mentor as well as tutor her daughter and thus motivate her to improve in her studies. So with Nandhini's help, she is enrolled in the same school as her daughter. This infuriates Abhinaya, who hates to see her mother in her daily school life. Shanti proves to her daughter that age is not a major deterrent to learning and that she can pick up where she left off several years ago. Shanti studies hard and challenges Abhinaya to score higher marks than her in the half-yearly exams. Abhinaya starts taking math seriously and does well in her exams. Seeing this, Shanti thinks Abhinaya has turned over into a new leaf and her attitude has changed, so she wants to discontinue school. Seeing this, Abhinaya confesses that her hard work to succeed in math and pass the exam was so that her mother could drop out of school.

There is this wonderful twist which shows the psychology of human nature. Shanti works night and day to earn and collect money for her daughter's future, while the daughter spends all that earned money in one day. Abhinaya comes home with new clothes and shoes to find her mother looking through jars to find where the money she earned for Abhinaya's future went. They argue, and Abhinaya says that she knows what Shanti's job is and that she sees a man drop her home every day at night. Abhinaya finally learns the truth about her mother from her classmate and is ashamed of her rebellious behaviour. She realises the value of education and her mother's dream, which is Abhinaya. Her goal is to make Abhinaya's life more independent. The final scenes show Abhinaya passing her 10thsStandard, and then years later getting interviewed by IAS Officers, who ask her why she is pursuing Civil Services, and her reply says it all: "So that I do not become a maid".

== Cast ==
- Amala Paul as Shanti Gopal
- Revathi as Dr. Nandhini
- Yuvasri Lakshmi as Abhinaya Gopal
- Samuthirakani as Ranganathan
- Malvika Jayan
- Vishal Dev
- Vicky

== Production ==
In November 2015, Ashwini Iyer Tiwari agreed terms to direct a remake of her Hindi film, Nil Battey Sannata in Tamil, for producers Dhanush and Anand L. Rai. Dhanush had been shown a preview of the film by Rai, during a visit to Mumbai in September 2015 and the duo chose to co-produce the film, with Ashwini Iyer retained as director, while Amala Paul and Revathi were signed on to play the leading roles. Principal photography began on 7 January 2016 in Chennai, and wrapped in late February 2016.

== Soundtrack ==
The music was composed by Ilaiyaraaja.

Track listing
No.	Title	Lyrics	Singer(s)	Length
1.	"Maths Tough"	Na. Muthukumar	Srinisha Jayaseelan	03:06
2.	"Unakkum Enakkum"	Ilaiyaraaja	Ramya NSK, Vandana Srinivasan	03:28
3.	"Kadavul Padaippil"	Ilaiyaraaja	Haricharan	02:28
4.	"Kanavugal"	Ilaiyaraaja	Surmukhi Raman	00:54
5.	"Indha Vazhkai"	Palani Bharathi	Shashaa Tirupati	01:20
Total length:				11:16

== Critical reception ==
S Saraswathi of Rediff.com stated that "Despite the ordinary performances, Amma Kanakku has a wonderful message and certainly deserves a watch" and gave 3 stars out of 5. M. Suganth of The Times of India noted that "It is only the panache in the filmmaking that stops the film from crumbling" and gave 3 out of 5. Anupama Subramanian of Deccan Chronicle stated, "A modest feel-good film worth a watch!". Baradwaj Rangan wrote for The Hindu that it was a "feel-good film with a problem at its core".
