= Teliamura railway station =

Railway station in Tripura, India

Teliamura তেলিয়ামুড়া
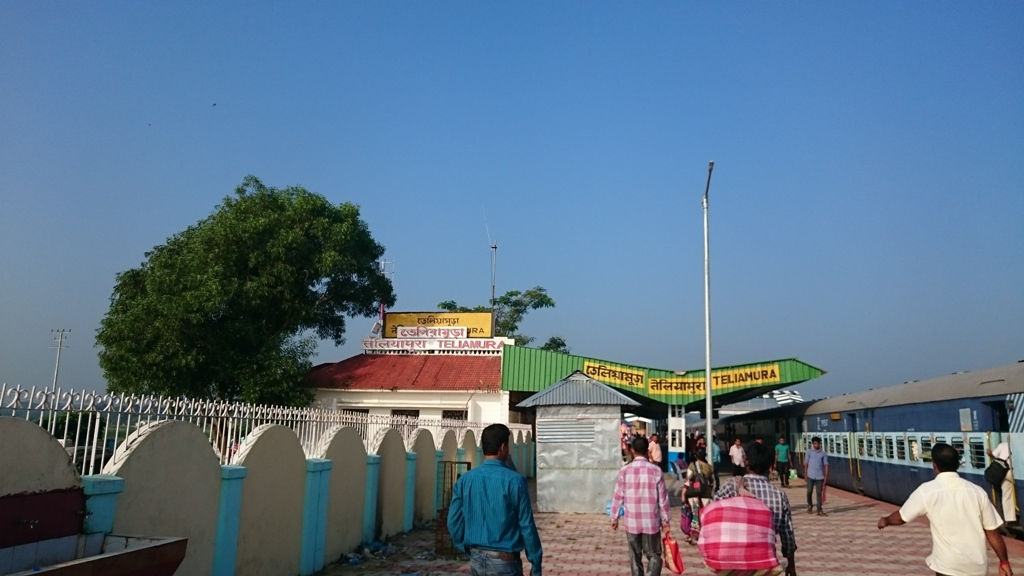
- Teliamura railway station platform 1

General information
- Location: Teliamura Station Rd., Teliamura, Khowai district, Tripura; India
- Coordinates: 23.8613°N 91.6183°E
- Elevation: 47 metres (154 ft)
- System: Express train & Passenger train station
- Owner: Indian Railways
- Operator: Northeast Frontier Railway zone
- Line: Lumding–Sabroom section
- Platforms: 2
- Tracks: 3

Construction
- Structure type: At Ground
- Parking: Available
- Accessible: Disabled access

Other information
- Status: Functional
- Station code: TLMR
- Zone(s): Northeast Frontier Railway zone
- Division(s): Lumding

History
- Opened: 2008; 18 years ago
- Rebuilt: 2016; 10 years ago
- Electrified: No.
Location
- Location within Tripura

Teliamura railway station (station code TLMR) is at Teliamura city in Khowai district in the Indian state of Tripura on the Lumding–Sabroom section.

== Administration ==
It is in the Lumding railway division of the Northeast Frontier Railway zone of the Indian Railways. It has an average elevation of 47 metres (154 ft).

The railway line has single 5 ft 6 in (1,676 mm) broad gauge track from Lumding junction in Assam to Agartala in West Tripura district of Tripura.

== History ==
Teliamura railway station became operation in 2008 with the metre-gauge line from Lumding to Agartala but later in 2016 entire section converted into broad-gauge line.

== Platforms ==
There are a total of 2 platforms and 3 tracks. The platforms are connected by foot overbridge. These platforms are built to accommodate 24 coaches express train.

=== Station layout ===
G	Street level	Exit/Entrance & ticket counter
P1	FOB, Side platform, No-1 doors will open on the left/right
P1	Track 1
P1	Track 2
P1	Track 3
P1	FOB, Side platform, No- 2 doors will open on the left/right

== Nearest airport ==
The nearest airports are Agartala Airport at Agartala, Silchar Airport at Silchar.

== See also ==
- Teliamura
- Lumding–Sabroom section
- Northeast Frontier Railway zone
