= Gavemic U. Ary =

Indian cinematographer

Gavemic Ary
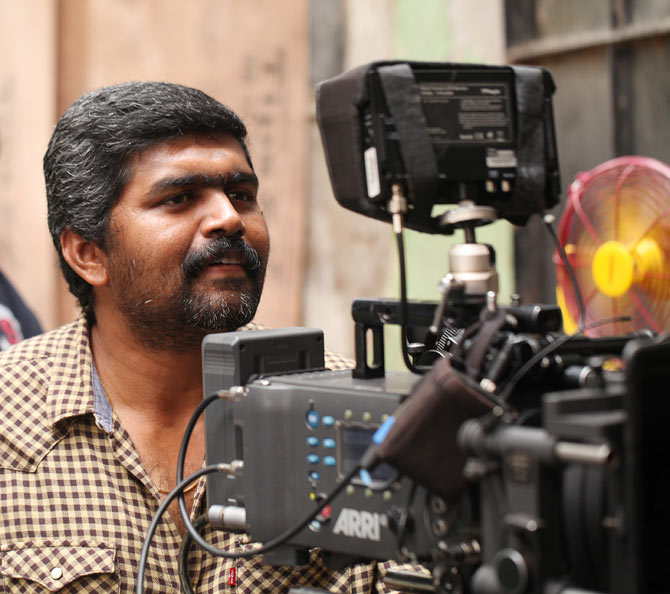
- Born: Thanjavur, India
- Occupation: Cinematographer
- Years active: 2001–present
- Organization: Southern India Cinematographers Association (SICA)

Gavemic Ary is an Indian cinematographer. He began his career in the Indian film industry in the 2000s, working as an Assistant Cameraman under the mentorship of cinematographer Santosh Sivan.

== Life ==
He began his career in Indian film productions in the 2000s, when he started working as an Assistant Cameraman under the supervision of cinematographer Santosh Sivan.

His first film as a cinematographer was the 2012 independent film Mastram, which followed the journey of a writer, in which he used the Arri Alexa.

== Filmography ==
Year	Film	Language	Notes
2014	Mastram	Hindi	
2014	Jigarthanda	Tamil	
2016	Nil Battey Sannata	Hindi	
2016	Amma Kanakku	Tamil	
2017	Bareilly Ki Barfi	Hindi	
2021	Bunty Aur Babli 2	Hindi	
2022	Bachchhan Paandey	Hindi	
2024	Mission: Chapter 1	Tamil	Additional cinematography
2024	Teenz	Tamil	
2025	Kadhalikka Neramillai	Tamil	

== Sources ==
- Gavemic U. Ary at IMDb
