= Naati Pinky Ki Lambi Love Story =

Indian television drama series

- Genre: Drama
- Created by: Sukesh Motwani
- Written by: Malavika Asthana
- Directed by: Rohit Dwivedi
- Creative director: Tanu Tiwari
- Starring: Riya Shukla; Puneett Chouksey
- Country of origin: India
- Original language: Hindi
- No. of seasons: 1
- No. of episodes: 102

Production
- Producers: Mautik Tolia; Sukesh Motwani
- Production locations: Mumbai, Maharashtra, India
- Cinematography: Anil Katke; Mangal Singh
- Camera setup: Multi-camera
- Running time: Approx. 20-27 minutes
- Production company: Bodhi Tree Multimedia

Original release
- Network: Colors TV
- Release: 27 January – 2 October 2020

Naati Pinky Ki Lambi Love Story (Short Pinky's Long Love Story) is an Indian television drama series which premiered 27 January 2020 on Colors TV. Produced by Bodhi Tree Productions, it starred Riya Shukla and Puneett Chouksey.

== Plot ==
Lavanya "Pinky" Kashyap is an aspiring comedian who is often teased for her shortness. She marries Gagan. After the marriage, they learn of his extramarital affair leading Pinky to leave the house and return to her maternal home. During a disagreement with her father she leaves the house along with her grandmother Sarla. At Arjun's insistence, they accept for her to live with him but only if he takes a deposit for their rent. Arjun helps Pinky to divorce Gagan, and convinces her conservative father, who continues to try to hurt her while Arjun protects her putting his life in danger. Pinky also starts to dress up as Imarti, something which her dadi knows about and eventually her mother Nalini and aunt Antara (her father's sister). She also marries Arjun as Imarti (as their fake marriage ends up as a real one) to help him gain custody of Nandu who is revealed to be his adopted daughter as he and Ananya had three miscarriages. Meanwhile, Arjun's mother, whom Arjun hates tries to re-enter his life and to have him marry a girl of her choice. Later on Pinky on Antara's insistence realizes that she has started developing feelings for Arjun but goes on to agree to marry Vikas, a boy chosen by her father. Antara on one hand promises to unite Arjun and Pinky against Pinky's mother and even Pinky, who does not want to oppose her father's wishes, will. At the end, Pinky's father agrees to her marriage and accepts Arjun as Pinky's husband. Arjun says that Naati Pinky ki Lambi Love Story is completed and there comes a caption that reads To New Beginnings.

== Cast ==
=== Main ===
- Riya Shukla as Lavanya "Pinky" Kashyap Venkatraman/Bhardwaj – Nalini and Ram's younger daughter; Ananya's sister; Sarthak and Shraddha's cousin; Gagan's ex-wife; Arjun's wife
- Puneett Chouksey as Arjun Venkatraman – Revati's son: Ananya's widower; Pinky's husband; Nandu's adoptive father

=== Recurring ===
- Vishwajeet Pradhan as Ram Kashyap – Sarla's elder son; Lakshman and Antara's brother; Nalini's husband; Ananya and Pinky's father
- Pyumori Mehta Ghosh as Nalini Kashyap – Ram's wife; Ananya and Pinky's mother
- Bharati Achrekar as Sarla Kashyap – Ram, Antara and Lakshman's mother; Ananya, Sarthak, Shraddha and Pinky's grandmother
- Neelam Gupta as Asha Kashyap – Lakshman's wife; Sarthak and Shraddha's mother
- Madan Tyagi as Lakshman Kashyap – Sarla's younger son; Ram and Antara's brother; Asha's husband; Sarthak and Shraddha's father
- Sheetal Ranjankar as Shraddha Kashyap – Asha and Lakshman's daughter; Sarthak's sister
- Arjun Singh Shekhawat as Sarthak Kashyap – Asha and Lakshman's son; Shraddha's brother
- Unknown as Ananya Kashyap Venkatraman – Nalini and Ram's elder daughter; Pinky's sister; Sarthak and Shraddha's cousin; Arjun's first wife; Nandu's adoptive mother (Dead)
- Aadya Jha/Adiba Hussain as Nandini "Nandu" Venkatraman – Ananya and Arjun's adopted daughter
- Jaskaran Singh Gandi as Sunny Narvekar – Arjun's best friend
- Anjali Mukhi as Revati Venkatraman – Arjun's mother
- Dhiraj Rai as Gagan Bhardwaj: Pinky's former husband; Megha's former lover
- Ravneet Kaur as Megha Singhania: Gagan's former lover
- Vibhuti Thakur as Kanchan Bhardwaj: Gagan's aunt
- Gurdeep Kohli as Antara Kashyap: Sarla's daughter; Ram and Lakshman's sister
- Priyal Gor as Parvathy
- Adhitya deshmukh as Vikas Kumar Patel
- Sangeeta Adhikary as Kalyani Naagar
- Ira Dua as Child Protection Rights Officer

=== Guest appearance ===
- Nimrit Kaur Ahluwalia as Meher Sarabjeet Singh Gill from Choti Sarrdaarni (2020)

== Production ==
The production and airing of the show was halted indefinitely in late March 2020 due to the COVID-19 outbreak in India. Because of the outbreak, the filming of television series and films was halted on 19 March 2020 and expected to resume on 1 April 2020 but could not and the series was last broadcast on 13 July 2020 when the remaining episodes were aired.
