= Jogendranagar railway station =

Railway station in Tripura, India

Jogendranagar

General information
- Location: Station Road, Subhash Nagar, Jogendra Nagar, Agartala, West Tripura, Tripura; India
- Coordinates: 23.8115587°N 91.3072882°E
- Elevation: 39 m (128 ft)
- System: Indian Railways station Regional rail, Light rail
- Owner: Indian Railways
- Operator: Northeast Frontier Railway
- Line: Lumding–Sabroom section
- Platforms: 1
- Tracks: 1
- Connections: Auto rickshaw, Bus

Construction
- Structure type: Standard (on-ground station)
- Parking: Available

Other information
- Status: Functioning, Multiple Diesel-Line
- Station code: JGNR
- Zone(s): Northeast Frontier Railway zone
- Division(s): Lumding

History
- Opened: 2008; 18 years ago
- Rebuilt: 2016; 10 years ago

Services
Preceding station	Indian Railways	Following station
Agartala towards ?	Northeast Frontier Railway zone Lumding–Sabroom section	Jirania towards ?
Location
- Location within Tripura

Jogendranagar Railway Station is located at Jogendranagar in Tripura, India. It is an Indian railway station of the Lumding–Sabroom line in the Northeast Frontier Railway zone of Indian Railways. The station is situated at Jogendranagar in West Tripura district in the Indian state of Tripura. Total 6 Passengers trains halt in the station.

== Details ==
The station lies on the 312 km-long 1,676 mm (5 ft 6 in) broad-gauge Lumding–Sabroom railway line which comes under the Lumding railway division of the Northeast Frontier Railway zone of Indian Railways. It is a single line without electrification.

== Services ==
- 2 trains per day run between Agartala and Dharmanagar. The trains stop at Jogendranagar station.
- 1 train per day runs between Agartala and Silchar. The train stops at Jogendranagar station.

== Station layout ==
G	Street level	Exit/Entrance & Ticket counter
P1	Side platform, No-1 doors will open on the left/right
P1	Track 1

== See also ==
- National Highway 8 (India)
- Lumding–Sabroom section
- Northeast Frontier Railway zone
