= Khowai Airport =

Airport of Tripura, India

Khowai Airport खोवाई हवाई अड्डा
- IATA: IXN; ICAO: VEKW

Summary
- Airport type: Public
- Operator: Airports Authority of India
- Serves: Khowai
- Location: Khowai, India
- Elevation AMSL: 29 m / 95 ft
- Coordinates: 24°03′42″N 091°36′14″E

Map
- Location of the airport in Tripura IXN (India)

Runways
| Direction | Length | | Surface |
| Direction | m | ft | Surface |
|---|---|---|---|
| 18/36 | 914 | 3,000 | Asphalt |

Khowai Airport is a small airport located in Khowai, Tripura, India. It is managed by the Airports Authority of India and is non-operational.

== Incidents ==
On 29 March 1955, a Dacota belonging to Airways (India) overran a wet runway and ended up in a ditch. Though there were no casualties, the aircraft was damaged beyond repair and written off.
