= Indranagar =

- Census town
- Location in Tripura Location in India
- Coordinates: 23°51′29″N 91°17′51″E
- Country: India
- State: Tripura
- District: West Tripura
- Elevation: 27 m (89 ft)

Population (2001)
  - Total: 17,679

Languages
  - Official: Bengali, Kokborok, English
- Time zone: UTC+5:30 (IST)

Indranagar is a census town in West Tripura district in the Indian state of Tripura. The locality is famous for the Kali temple. Everyday many devotees are found to offer worship to the goddess Kali. During Dewali a fair is held for three days. Large gathering is observed. ITI is another landmark of the place.

== Demographics ==
As of 2001 India census, Indranagar had a population of 17,679. Males constitute 51% of the population and females 49%. Indranagar has an average literacy rate of 77%, higher than the national average of 59.5%: male literacy is 82%, and female literacy is 72%. In Indranagar, 10% of the population is under 6 years of age.
