= Sadar Sub-division =

Sub division in Tripura, India

Sadar
- Sub division
- Country: India
- State: Tripura
- District: West Tripura

Government
  - Sub Divisional Magistrate: Arup Deb

Area
  - Total: 1,506 km^{2} (581 sq mi)

Population
  - Total: 472,729
  - Density: 314/km^{2} (810/sq mi)

Sadar is the headquarter and a Sub division of West Tripura district in the Indian state of Tripura. Agartala Municipal corporation comes under this Subdivision and had only one block name, Dukli. Sadar sub division has total three revenue circles, Agartala East, Agartala and Dukli. Along with this, there are a total of 13 tehsils and 19 Panchayats.

== Demographics ==
As per 2011 census, the total population of Sadar sub division is 472,729 out of which males are 242,948 and females are 229,181.

== Divisions ==
Tehsils of Sadar
Sub division	Revenue Circle	Tehsil
Sadar	Agartala East	Agartala East, Indranagar, Abhaynagar, Yogendranagar
Sadar	Agartala	Agartala west, Barjala, Ramnagar, Bordowali
Sadar	Dukli	Bikramnagar, Suryamaninagar, Badharghat, Dukli, Srinagar
