= Teliamura =

- Town
- Location within Tripura Location within India
- Coordinates: 23.72°N 91.74°E
- Country: India
- State: Tripura
- District: Khowai

Government
  - Type: Municipal Council
  - Body: Teliamura Municipal Council
  - Chairman: Rupak Sarkar (BJP)

Population (2015)
  - Total: 21,679

Languages
  - Official: Bengali, Kokborok, English
- Time zone: UTC+5:30 (IST)
- Postal code: 799205

Teliamura is a town and a Municipal Council in Khowai district in the Indian state of Tripura. It is on National Highway No. 08 of India. It is also the headquarters of the recently included sub-division of Teliamura. It is 45 km from Agartala, Capital of Tripura, 35 km from Khowai and 42 km from Ambassa.

== Geography ==
Teliamura is located at 23.72°N 91.74°E.

== Forest ==
In the Sub-Division of Teliamura there is a total of 49573 hectors of forest land in which the Kalyanpur range sector constitutes 17744 hector, whereas Teliamura range sector constitutes 6168 hector and 25661 hector in Mungiakami range sector.

== Demographics ==
As of 2011 India census GOI Teliamura has a population of 19,605. Males constitute 51% of the population and females 49%. Teliamura has an average literacy rate of 81%, higher than the national average of 59.5%: male literacy is 85%, and female literacy is 78%. In Teliamura, 10% of the population is under 6 years of age.

== Politics ==
Teliamura assembly constituency is part of Tripura East (Lok Sabha constituency).

== Education ==
One Inspectorate in the Sub-Division under which 15 H.S. Schools, 25 High Schools, 48 Sr. Basic Schools, 94 Junior Basic schools (Non-ADC - 36, ADC- 58) operate in Teliamura. Schools

- Saradamayee Vidyapith High School (English Medium)
- Kabi Nazrul Bidya Bhabhan
- Teliamura H.S. School
- Vivekanada High School
- Ananda Marga High School (English medium), with pre-primary section
- Netajinagar High School
- Bloom Adventist school
- NICs Teliamura, Khowai Tripura
- Kalyanpur H.S. School
- Assam rifles high school

Government Degree College was established in 2012.

== Transport ==
=== Train ===
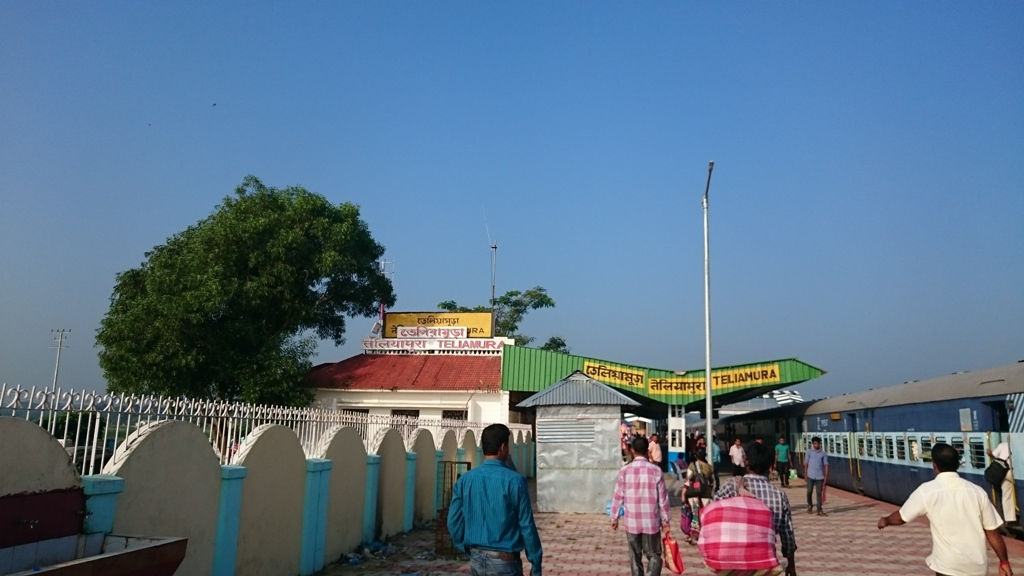
Teliamura railway station

It is well connected by Railways. Teliamura is situated at Trishabari, 3 km (1.9 mi) from Teliamura main Town. Regular auto service available from and to various part of Teliamura.

=== Road ===
Teliamura is connected with Assam through National Highway 8. It is also connected to Khowai, Amarpur by Road.

== See also ==
- List of cities and towns in Tripura
