= Jogendranagar =

Coordinates: 23°49′13″N 91°18′21″E

Jogendra Nagar
- Census town
- Interactive map of Jogendra Nagar
- Country: India
- State: Tripura
- District: West Tripura

Population (2001)
  - Total: 34,844

Languages
  - Official: Bengali, Kokborok, English
- Time zone: UTC+5:30 (IST)
- Vehicle registration: TR
- Website: tripura.gov.in

Jogendranagar is a census town in West Tripura district in the Indian state of Tripura. Jogendranagar has the only railway station after Agartala railway station, in Agartala.

== Demographics ==
As of the 2001 census of India, Jogendranagar had a population of 34,844. Males constitute 51% of the population and females 49%. Jogendranagar has an average literacy rate of 74%, higher than the national average of 59.5%: male literacy is 79%, and female literacy is 69%. In Jogendranagar, 11% of the population is under 6 years of age.
