= Sonamura =

- Town
- Location within Tripura Location within India
- Coordinates: 23.47°N 91.27°E
- Country: India
- State: Tripura
- District: Sipahijala district

Government
  - Type: Nagar Panchayat
  - Body: Sonamura Nagar Panchayat
  - Chairman: Smt. Sarada Chakraborty (BJP)
- Elevation: 15 m (49 ft)

Population (2015)
  - Total: 12,592

Languages
  - Official: Bengali, Kokborok, English
- Time zone: UTC+5:30 (IST)
- PIN: 799131
- Vehicle registration: TR
- Website: tripura.gov.in

Sonamura is a town and a Nagar Panchayat in the Indian state of Tripura. It is the headquarter of Sonamura Subdivision in Sipahijala district and lies on the border with Bangladesh to the east of Comilla.

== Demographics ==
As of the 2011 India census, Sonamura had a population of 10,074. Males constituted 51% of the population and females 49%. Sonamura has an average literacy rate of 73%, higher than the national average of 59.5%: male literacy is 77%, and female literacy is 68%. In Sonamura, 11% of the population is under 6 years of age.

== Politics ==
Sonamura’s assembly constituency is part of Tripura West (Lok Sabha constituency).

== See also ==
- List of cities and towns in Tripura
