= Sonamura subdivision =

Sonamura Subdivision
- Subdivision
- Location within Tripura Location within India
- Coordinates: 23.480°N 91.270°E
- Country: India
- Region: North-Eastern
- State: Tripura
- District: Sipahijala district

Area
  - Total: 479.53 km^{2} (185.15 sq mi)
- Elevation: 11 m (36 ft)

Population (2015)
  - Total: 271,302
  - Density: 566/km^{2} (1,470/sq mi)

Languages
  - Official: Bengali, Kokborok, English
  - Max. Spoken Language: Bengali, Tripuri, Hindi
- Time zone: UTC+5:30 (IST)
- PIN: 799115, 799131-132
- Vehicle registration: TR 07 XX YYYY
- Website: tripura.gov.in

Sonamura is a subdivision in Sipahijala district in the Indian state of Tripura. Sonamura is the headquarter. The subdivision contains one municipal council, one Nagar Panchayat, four RD blocks and 67 Gram Panchayats. Major towns include Melaghar, Kathalia and Sonamura.
