= Khowai district =

- District of Tripura
- Interactive map of Khowai district
- Coordinates (Khowai): 23.8974°N 91.6372°E
- Country: India
- State: Tripura
- Established: January 2012
- Headquarters: Khowai
- Tehsils: 1. Khowai; 2. Teliamura

Area
  - Total: 1,377.28 km^{2} (531.77 sq mi)

Population (2011)
  - Total: 327,564
  - Density: 237.834/km^{2} (615.987/sq mi)

Demographics
  - Literacy: 87.78
  - Sex ratio: 957
- Time zone: UTC+05:30 (IST)
- Average annual precipitation: 2570 mm
- Website: khowai.nic.in

Khowai district is a district of Tripura state of India. This district was created in January, 2012 when four new districts were created in Tripura, taking the number of districts in the state from four to eight. The district headquarters are located in the town Khowai. The district was carved out of West Tripura district along with new Sipahijala district. The district is divided into two subdivisions, namely Khowai and Teliamura.

== Etymology ==
Khowai district derives its name from the namesake Khowai river, which runs across the district in north-south direction almost in the middle.

== Geography ==
Khowai district is surrounded by Kamalpur subdivision of Dhalai district in the east, Sadar subdivision of West Tripura in the west and Amarpur subdivision of Gomati district in the south. Khowai district also shares a border with Bangladesh in the north.

There are 55 gram panchayats and 2 municipalities, namely, Khowai and Teliamura in this district. There are 69 village committees that falls under ADC.

== Division ==
The district is divided into two subdivisions: Khowai subdivision and Teliamura subdivision. Khowai district has been divided into 6 blocks, namely, Khowai, Padmabil, Tulashikhar, Kalyanpur, Teliamura and Mungiakami.

== Demographics ==
According to the 2011 census, Khowai district had a population of 327,564. Khowai has a sex ratio of 957 females to 1000 males and a literacy rate of 88.37%. Scheduled Castes and Scheduled Tribes make up 63,062 (19.25%) and 139,537 (42.60%) of the population respectively.

Religions in Khowai district (2011)
Religion	Percent
Hindus	95.35%
Christians	3.56%
Muslims	0.71%
Other or not stated	0.38%
Distribution of religions

Khowai had 312,338 Hindus, 11,669 Christians and 2,333 Muslims.

Languages of Khowai district (2011)
1. Bengali (51.4%)
2. Kokborok (39.5%)
3. Odia (2.04%)
4. Hindi (1.13%)
5. Mundari (1.07%)
6. Others (4.77%)

At the time of the 2011 census, 51.44% of the population spoke Bengali, 39.55% Kokborok, 2.27% Odia, 1.13% Hindi and 1.07% Mundari as their first language.

== Transport ==
Railway

Lumding–Sabroom line of Northeast Frontier Railway passes through Khowai district. The main station in district is Teliamura railway station, providing connectivity to Tripura capital Agartala and Assam.

== Monuments ==
Some historical monuments are there in Khowai District. One of this Nupilan Memorial Complex has established at Gournagar to commemorate the great sacrifice of Manipuri women during 12 December 1939 against mass exploitation and artificial famine triggered by British imperialist in Manipur which is popularly known as Manipur Women War Statue. another monument Khumari Madhuti Rupashi located at Padmabil Bazar.

== Places of interest ==
Places of Interest at Khowai district are as follows:

- Baramura Eco Park
- Chakmaghat Park, Teliamura
- Banabithi Eco Park, Padmabil, Khowai
- Jangal Mahal, Khowai

== See also ==
- List of districts of Tripura
