= Khowai =

- Khowai
- Location within Tripura Location within India
- Coordinates: 24°3′54″N 91°36′18″E
- Country: India
- State: Tripura
- District: Khowai district

Government
  - Type: Municipal Council
  - Body: Khowai Municipal Council
  - Chairman: Debasish Nath Sharma (BJP)
- Elevation: 23 m (75 ft)

Population (2015)
  - Total: 21,387

Languages
  - Official: Bengali, Kokborok, English
  - Spoken Languages: Bengali, Kokborok, Meitei
- Time zone: UTC+5:30 (IST)
- PIN: 799201, 799202, 799203
- Area code: 3825
- Vehicle registration: TR06
- Website: www.khowai.nic.in

Khowai is a town located in the Indian state of Tripura and a Municipal Council in Khowai district. The city lies on the banks of Khowai river and hence from the river the city gets its name. It was originally settled upon by Upendranath Roy. Located near the Bangladesh border, Khowai has boundaries with Bangladesh on its entire northern part.

== Demographics ==
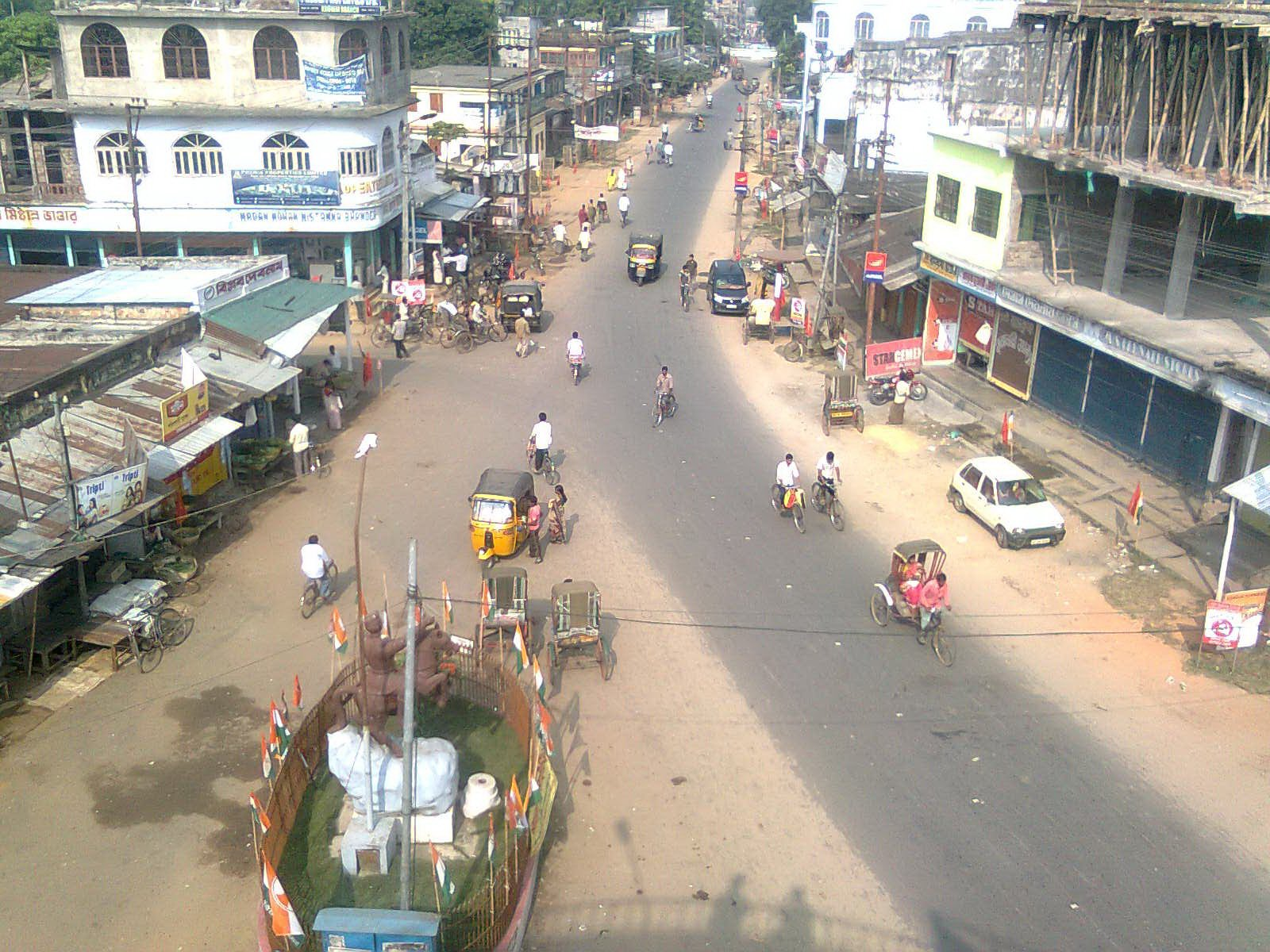
A view of Shubhash park from Kohinoor Complex

As of the 2001 India census, Khowai had a population of 17,621. Males constituted 51% of the population and females 49%. Khowai has an average literacy rate of 86%, higher than the national average of 59.5%: male literacy is 88%, and female literacy is 85%. In Khowai, 9% of the population is under 6 years of age.

== Forest ==
There are two range sector offices in the subdivision of Khowai – Khowai and Padmabil. The Khowai range has 13,578 hectares of forest land whereas the Padmabil range has 6,468 hectares of forest land.

== Health ==
Khowai has one district hospital (Khowai Hospital), five Public Health centers, and 43 health sub-centers.

== Geography and climate ==
Khowai is situated in a plain along the Khowai River and has a monsoon influenced humid subtropical climate with large amounts of rain almost all year. The city experiences long, hot and wet summers, lasting from April to October. Average temperatures are around 28 °C (82 °F), fluctuating with rainfall. There is a short, mild winter from mid-November to early March, with mostly dry conditions and average temperatures around 18 °C (64 °F).

== Culture ==
There is predominance of both the Kokborok, Bangla and Manipuri languages in Khowai. The main festivals of the town are Durga Puja, Kharchi, Garia Pooja, Tring (Tripuri new year) and Manipuri Yaosang (holi) etc.

== Indo-Bangladesh border ==
The length of the border along Khowai is 61.5 km. It is almost fully fenced (only 950 metres are pending).

== Khowai district ==
The sub-division has already become a district named "Khowai". All the district regulatory offices will start functioning in the district town Khowai. Two sub-divisions, Khowai and Teliamura, make up the new district, with a total area of 1378.28 km^{2}. Saradamayee Vidyapith is one of the best English medium schools in Teliamura subdivision of Khowai district.

== Monuments ==
There are some famous historical monuments in Khowai Sub-division. Some of these are Nupilal Statue (Women War Statue) has established at Meitei people dominated village Gournagar in memory of great sacrifice of manipuri women against mass exploitation and artificial famine triggered by British emperialist in Manipur during 1939, 12 December. Every calendar year on 12 December has been observed this very special day in State level with a colourful cultural programmes and Symposium, poetry reading on women empowerment. Another historical spot is Kumari Madhuti Rupashi monuments situated at padmabil near Padmabil Bazar.

== Transport ==
Khowai Airport which serves Khowai, is currently non-operational.

== Education ==
- Dasaratha Deb Memorial College
- Jawahar Novadaya Vidyalaya
- Khowai Government Class XII School
- Khowai Government Girls' Class XII School
- Khowai Government English Medium Class XII School
- Sharat Chandra Class XII School
- Sonatala Govt. Class XII School
- Ananda Marga School
- Don Bosco School, Baijal bari
- Birchandrapur Higher Secondary School
Mohar Mukto moncho

== See also ==
- List of cities and towns in Tripura
