= West Tripura district =

Coordinates: 23°55′N 91°30′E

- District
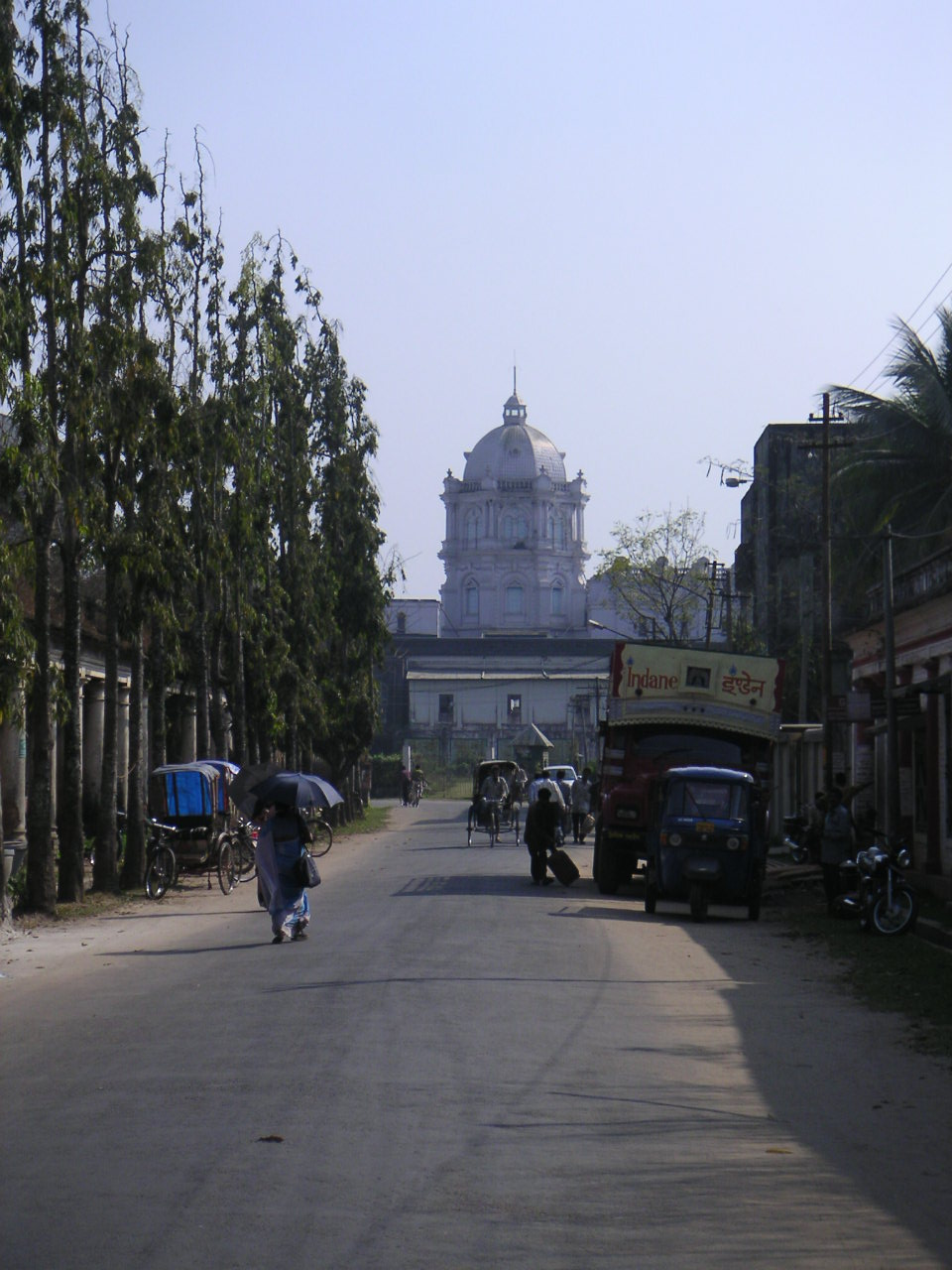
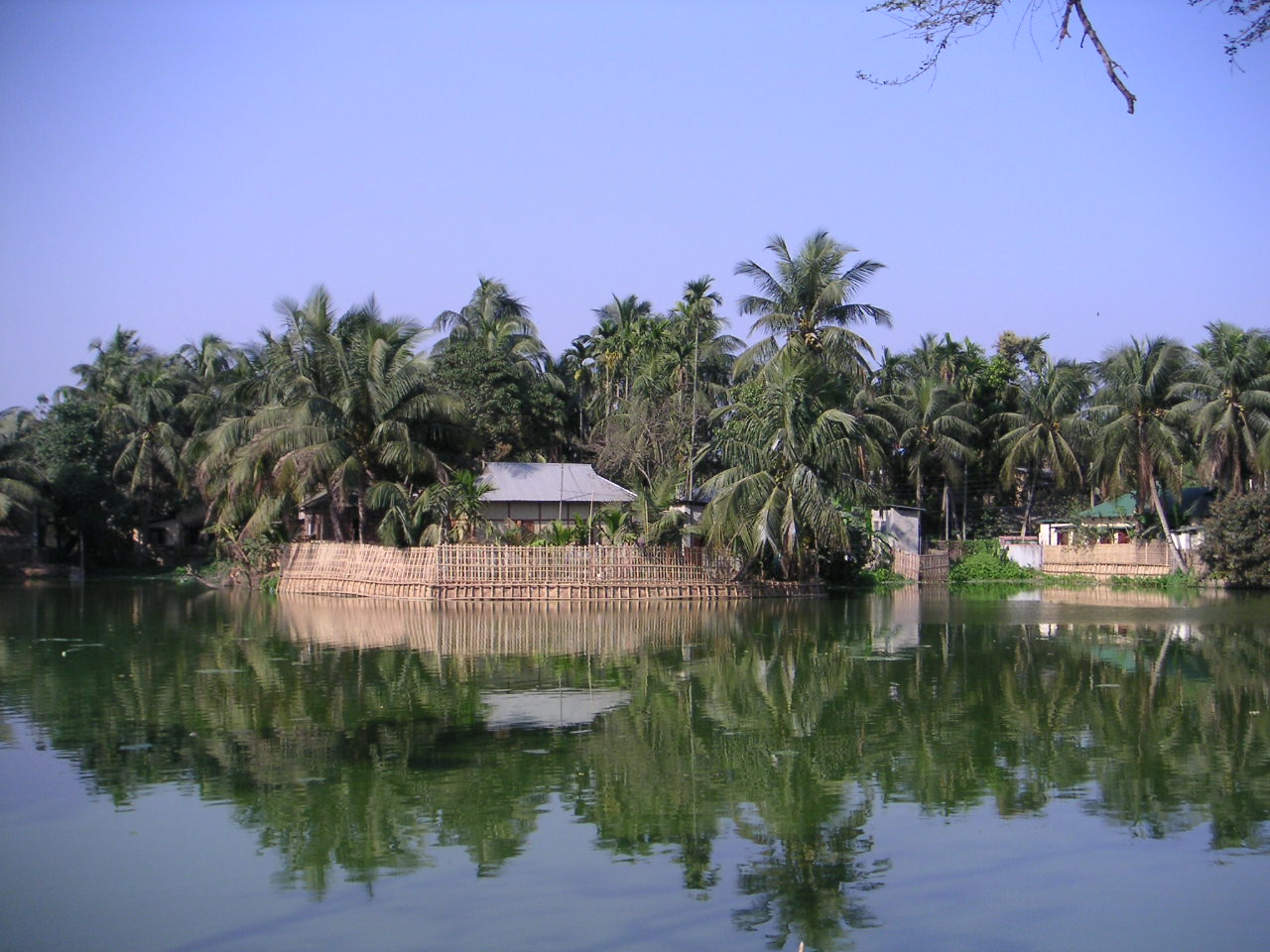
- Agartala North Gate; River scene in Agartala, West Tripura
- West Tripura district Location in Tripura
- Country: India
- State: Tripura
- Established: 1 September 1970
- Headquarters: Agartala

Government
  - District Magistrate: Vishal Kumar, IAS
  - Superintendent of police: Kiran Kumar K., IPS

Area
  - Total: 983.63 km^{2} (379.78 sq mi)

Population (2011)
  - Total: 918,200
  - Density: 933.5/km^{2} (2,418/sq mi)

Languages
  - Official: Bengali, Kokborok, English
- Time zone: UTC+05:30 (IST)
- ISO 3166 code: IN-TR-WT
- Spoken languages: Bengali, Kokborok
- Ethnicity: Bengali, Tripuri
- Website: https://westtripura.nic.in/

West Tripura district is an administrative district in the state of Tripura in India. The district headquarters are located at Agartala. As of 2012, it is the most populous of Tripura's eight districts.

Agartala

Climate chart (precipitation, max. and min. temperature)
J	F	M	A	M	J	J	A	S	O	N	D
9.1 26 10	20 29 13	59 33 19	182 34 22	316 33 24	455 32 25	386 31 25	313 32 25	225 32 24	165 31 22	40 29 17	8.4 26 11
- █ Average max. and min. temperatures in °C
- █ Precipitation totals in mm
- Source: IMD
Imperial conversion
J	F	M	A	M	J	J	A	S	O	N	D
0.4 78 50	0.8 83 56	2.3 91 65	7.2 94 72	12 91 74	18 89 76	15 88 76	12 89 76	8.9 89 76	6.5 88 72	1.6 84 62	0.3 80 52
- █ Average max. and min. temperatures in °F
- █ Precipitation totals in inches

== District profile ==
The information provided below are taken from a book based on 2012 statistics, all the names, infos, details, etc. are in effect from and on 2012.

Nos	Info	Details
1	Inauguration date	1 September 1970
2	Present DM	Vishal Kumar (IAS)
3	First DM	R Ghosh (IAS) from 5 November 1951 to 26 September 1954.
4	Present SP	Kiran Kumar K (IPS)
5	Area in km^{2}	983.63
6	Population Density	1005
7	Population(2011)	988,192
8	Rural Population	577,453 (58%)
9	Urban Population	410,739 (42%)
10	Literacy	91.31% (♂ & ♀ 94% & 88% respectively)
11	BPL Population	Rural 62%, Urban 30%
12	Cultivated Land	40% of district area
13	Irrigable Land	14623 Hectares
14	Power Connectivity	140/147 Villages
15	Self Help Groups	5468
16	Assembly Constituencies	14 (SDR: 8 MNP:3 JRN: 3)
17	TTAADC Constituencies	5 (Sadar: 1 MNP:2 JRN: 2)
18	Voters	583,434
19	No. of Colleges	21

=== Divisions ===
West Tripura district has three sub-divisions: Mohanpur Subdivision, Jirania Subdivision, and Sadar Subdivision. It is split into nine blocks: Bamutia, Belbari, Dukli, Hezamara, Jirania, Lefunga, Mandwi, Mohanpur, Old Agartala.

=== Lok Sabha constituencies ===
West Tripura district is located in two Lok Sabha constituencies: Tripura West (shared with South Tripura district), and Tripura East (shared with South Tripura, Dhalai and North Tripura districts).

== Demographics ==
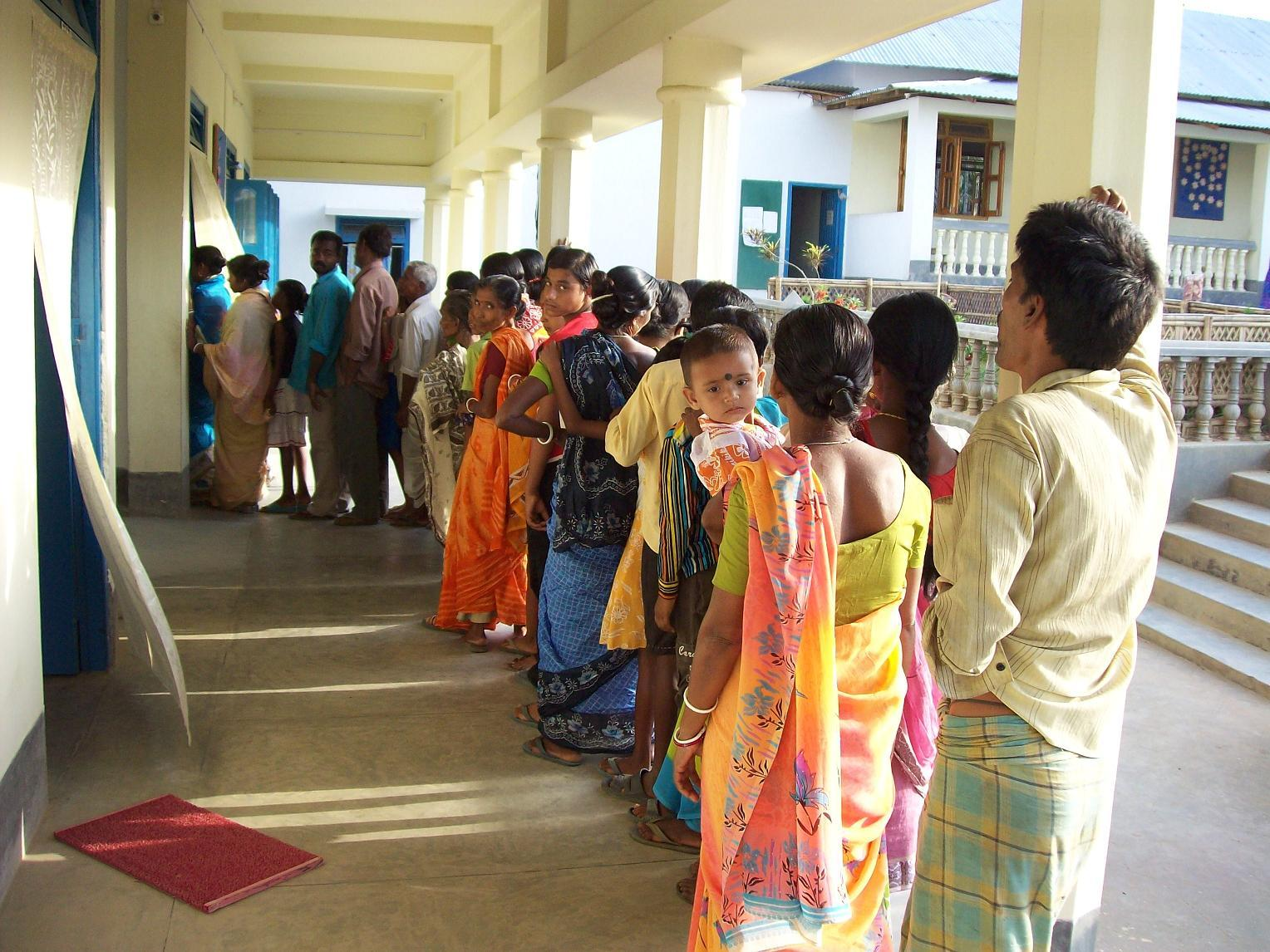
West Tripurans waiting in line.

According to the 2011 census, West Tripura district has a population of 1,725,739 ranking it 281st nationally. The district has a population density of 576 inhabitants per square kilometre (1,490/sq mi) . Its population growth rate in 2001–2011 was 12.5%. West Tripura has a sex ratio of 964 females for every 1000 males, and a literacy rate of 88.91%. After reorganisation, the residual district had a population was 918,200. 64.12% of the population lived in urban areas. Scheduled castes and tribes made up 192,475 (20.96%) and 176,596 (19.23%) of the population respectively.

Religions in West Tripura district (2011)
Religion	Percent
Hinduism	92.70%
Islam	3.53%
Christianity	3.33%
Other or not stated	0.44%
Distribution of religions

West Tripura had 851,203 Hindus, 32,420 Muslims and 30,554 Christians.

West Tripura	Urban Pop. % of total population	Sex ratio (♀ per 1000 ♂)	Density Population
1981	15.29	941	364
1991	24.29	946	963
2011	42.00	-	1005

Languages of West Tripura district (2011)
1. Bengali (76.2%)
2. Kokborok (17.7%)
3. Hindi (2.04%)
4. Others (4.04%)

In 2011, 76.23% of the population spoke Bengali, 17.69% Kokborok and 2.04% Hindi as their first language.

== Flora and fauna ==
In 1987, the Sipahijola Wildlife Sanctuary was established in the West Tripura district, with an area of 18.5 km^{2}.
