= Hapa–Naharlagun Weekly Express =

Train in India

Hapa - Naharlagun Weekly Express

Overview
- Service type: Express
- Status: Active
- Locale: Gujarat, Madhya Pradesh, Uttar Pradesh, Bihar, West Bengal, Assam and Arunachal Pradesh
- First service: 23 September 2026; 12 days ago
- Current operator: Western Railway (WR)

Route
- Termini: Hapa (HAPA); Naharlagun (NHLN)
- Stops: 49
- Distance travelled: 3,187 km (1,980 mi)
- Average journey time: 63h 20m
- Service frequency: Weekly
- Train number: 19525 / 19526

On-board services
- Classes: Sleeper Class, AC 3rd Class, AC 2nd Class, AC 1st Class
- Seating arrangements: No
- Sleeping arrangements: Yes
- Catering facilities: Pantry Car; On-board Catering; E-Catering
- Observation facilities: Large windows
- Baggage facilities: No
- Other facilities: Below the seats

Technical
- Rolling stock: LHB coach
- Track gauge: 1,676 mm (5 ft 6 in)
- Electrification: 25 kV 50 Hz AC overhead line
- Operating speed: 130 km/h (81 mph) maximum, 51 km/h (32 mph) average including halts.
- Track owner: Indian Railways

The 19525 / 19526 Hapa–Naharlagun Weekly Express is an express train belonging to Western Railway zone that runs between the city Hapa of Gujarat and Naharlagun of Arunachal Pradesh in India.

It operates as train number 19525 from Hapa to Naharlagun and as train number 19526 in the reverse direction, serving the states of Gujarat, Madhya Pradesh, Uttar Pradesh, Bihar, West Bengal, Assam and Arunachal Pradesh.

== Services ==
- 19525 / Hapa–Naharlagun Weekly Express has an average speed of 50 km/h and covers 3187 km in 63h 20m.
- 19526 / Naharlagun–Hapa Weekly Express has an average speed of 51 km/h and covers 3187 km in 62h 35m.

== Schedule ==
- 19525 – 12:40 AM (Wednesday) [Hapa]
- 19526 – 9:40 AM (Saturday) [Naharlagun]

== Routes and halts ==
The important halts of the train are :

- Hapa
- Rajkot Junction
- Wankaner Junction
- Surendranagar Junction
- Ahmedabad Junction
- Nadiad Junction
- Anand Junction
- Chhayapuri (Vadodara)
- Godhra Junction
- Ratlam Junction
- Nagda Junction
- Ujjain Junction
- Maksi Junction
- Shajapur
- Biyavra Rajgarh
- Ruthiyai Junction
- Guna Junction
- Shivpuri
- Gwalior Junction
- Bhind
- Etawah Junction
- Govindpuri
- Prayagraj Junction
- Gyanpur Road
- Banaras
- Varanasi Junction
- Ghazipur City
- Ballia
- Chhapra Junction
- Hajipur Junction
- Shahpur Patori
- Barauni Junction
- Begusarai
- Khagaria Junction
- Naugachia
- Katihar Junction
- Barsoi Junction
- Kishanganj
- New Jalpaiguri Junction
- New Cooch Behar
- Kokrajhar
- New Bongaigaon Junction
- Barpeta Road
- Rangiya Junction
- Udalguri
- New Missamari
- Rangapara North Junction
- Harmuti Junction
- Naharlagun

== Coach composition ==
The train has 21 coaches are :

1. Sleeper Class - 15
2. AC 3rd Class - 3
3. AC 2nd Class - 1

== Traction ==
As the entire route is fully electrified, it is hauled by an Vadodara Loco Shed-based WAP-7 electric locomotive from Hapa to Naharlagun and vice versa.

== Rake reversal or rake share ==
No rake reversal or rake share.

== See also ==
Trains from Hapa :

1. Hapa–Shri Mata Vaishno Devi Katra Superfast Express
2. Dwarka Express
3. Madgaon–Hapa Superfast Express
4. Mumbai Central–Hapa Duronto Express
5. Surat–Hapa Intercity Express

Trains from Naharlagun :

1. Naharlagun–Guwahati Shatabdi Express
2. Arunachal AC Superfast Express
3. Naharlagun–New Delhi AC SF Express
4. Donyi Polo Express

== Notes ==
a. Runs a day in a week with both directions.
