= Dibrugarh–Kolkata Superfast Express =

Train in India

Overview
- Service type: Superfast
- Status: Cancelled
- Locale: Assam, Nagaland, West Bengal
- First service: 4 September 2012
- Current operator: Northeast Frontier Railway

Route
- Termini: Dibrugarh (DBRG); Kolkata (KOAA)
- Stops: 20
- Distance travelled: 1356 km
- Average journey time: 24 hours and 50 mins
- Service frequency: Weekly
- Train number: 12525/12526

On-board services
- Classes: AC 2 Tier (2A), AC 3 Tier (3A), Sleeper (SL)
- Seating arrangements: Available
- Catering facilities: Pantry car attached
- Observation facilities: Large windows
- Baggage facilities: Available

Technical
- Rolling stock: LHB coach
- Track gauge: Broad gauge
- Operating speed: 54 km/h

Dibrugarh–Kolkata Express was a weekly Superfast train that connects Dibrugarh, known as the "Tea City of India", in eastern Assam and Kolkata, West Bengal. The train runs between Dibrugarh station (Location: Banipur, Station Code: DBRG) of N F Railway and Kolkata station (Chitpur, Station Code: KOAA) of Eastern Railway. This train was announced in the Railway Budget 2012/2013. The inaugural run took place on 4 September 2012, from Dibrugarh. The train numbered as 12525/12526; 12526 covers a distance of 1356 km in 24 hours and 50 mins with an average speed of 54 km/h from Dibrugarh to Kolkata, and on its return journey 12525 covers the distance in 24 hours and 50 mins with an average speed of 54 km/h.

The train departs Dibrugarh every Tuesday at 14:10 hours to reach Kolkata Wednesday at 15:00 hours, and on return journey it departs Kolkata every Wednesday at 21:40 hours to reach Dibrugarh at 22:30 hours Friday. This train was cancelled during the COVID-19 pandemic and was not re-started after the resumption of the train services.

== Schedule ==
Train number	Station code	Departure station	Departure time	Departure day	Arrival station	Arrival time	Arrival day
12525	KOAA	Kolkata	21:40 PM	WED	Dibrugarh	22:30 PM	FRI
12526	DBRG	Dibrugarh	14:10 PM	TUE	Kolkata	15:00 PM	WED

== Route ==
WEST BENGAL

1. Kolkata (Starts)
2. Bandel Junction
3. Nabadwip Dham
4. Katwa
5. Azimganj Junction
6. Malda Town
7. New Jalpaiguri (Siliguri)
8. New Cooch Behar Junction

ASSAM

1. Fakiragram Junction
2. New Bongaigaon Junction
3. Rangiya Junction
4. Tangla
5. Udalguri
6. New Missamari
7. Rangapara North Junction
8. Viswanath Charali
9. Gohpur
10. Harmuti
11. North Lakhimpur
12. Gogamukh
13. Dhemaji
14. Dibrugarh (Ends)

== Coach composition ==
The train has LHB rakes with max speed of 110 kmph.

- 1 AC II Tier
- 3 AC III Tier
- 11 Sleeper coaches
- 1 AC hot buffet car
- 2 General
- 2 Generator cum Luggage/parcel van

Loco	1	2	3	4	5	6	7	8	9	10	11	12	13	14	15	16	17	18	19	20
	PV1	GEN	B1	B2	B3	A1	PC	S1	S2	S3	S4	S5	S6	S7	S8	S9	S10	S11	GEN	PV2

== Rake sharing ==
15906 / 15905 – Dibrugarh–Kanyakumari Vivek Express

== Traction ==
It is hauled by WDP-4D/WDP-4B class of locomotive of Diesel Loco Shed, Siliguri from Dibrugarh to New Cooch Behar. From there onwards it is hauled by WAP-7 Locomotive of Electric Loco Shed, Howrah till Kolkata.
