= Tatibahar railway station =

Railway station in Assam, India

Tatibahar
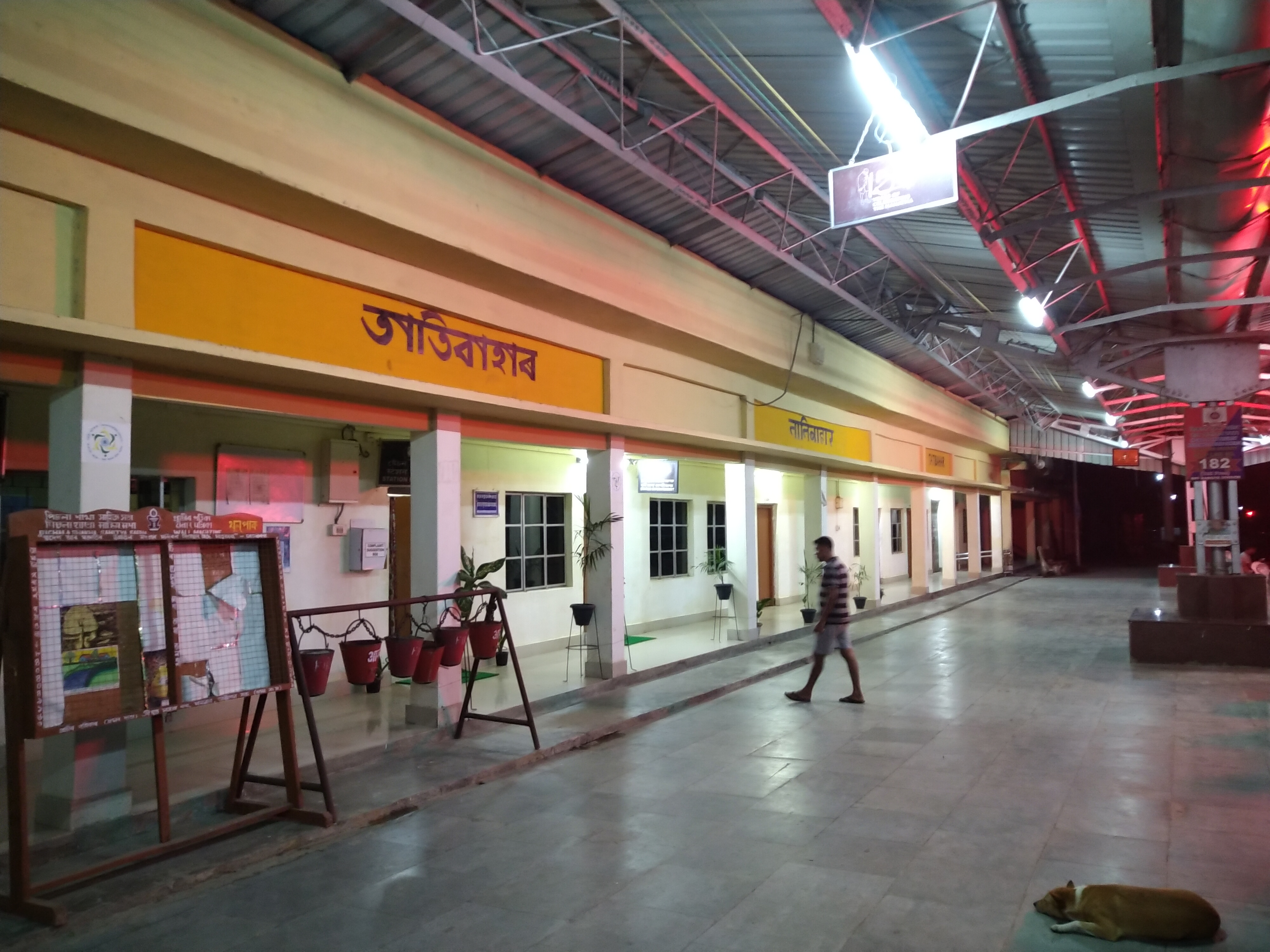

General information
- Location: Tatibahar, Assam; India
- Coordinates: 26.9802°N 93.8200°E
- Elevation: 85 metres (279 ft)
- System: Indian Railways station
- Owner: Indian Railways
- Operator: Northeast Frontier Railway
- Line: Rangiya–Murkongselek section
- Platforms: 2
- Tracks: 4
- Connections: Auto stand

Construction
- Structure type: Standard (on ground station)
- Parking: No
- Cycle facilities: No

Other information
- Status: Single diesel line
- Station code: TBH
- Zone(s): Northeast Frontier Railway
- Division(s): Rangiya

History
- Rebuilt: 2015
Location
- Location within Assam Location within India

Tatibahar Railway Station is a main railway station in Lakhimpur district, Assam. Its code is TBH. It serves Narayanpur town and nearby areas. The station consists of three platforms.

== Major trains ==
- Kamakhya–Murkongselek Lachit Express
- Rangapara North–Murkongselek Passenger
- Dekargaon–Murkongselek Passenger
- Naharlagun–Shokhüvi Donyi Polo Express
- Naharlagun−Guwahati Shatabdi Express
- Arunachal AC Superfast Express
