= New Tinsukia–Tambaram Express =

Train in India

New Tinsukia–Tambaram Weekly Express
Overview
- Service type: Express
- Status: Operating
- First service: 01 July 2001
- Current operator: Northeast Frontier Railway

Route
- Termini: New Tinsukia (NTSK); Tambaram (TBM)
- Stops: 39
- Distance travelled: 3175 km
- Average journey time: 61 hours and 55 mins
- Service frequency: Weekly
- Train number: 15929/15930

On-board services
- Classes: AC 2 Tier (2A), AC 3 Tier (3A), Sleeper (SL)
- Seating arrangements: Available
- Catering facilities: ✓ Pantry car ✓ On-board catering ✓ E-catering
- Baggage facilities: Available

Technical
- Rolling stock: LHB coach
- Track gauge: Broad gauge
- Operating speed: 51 km/h
Route map
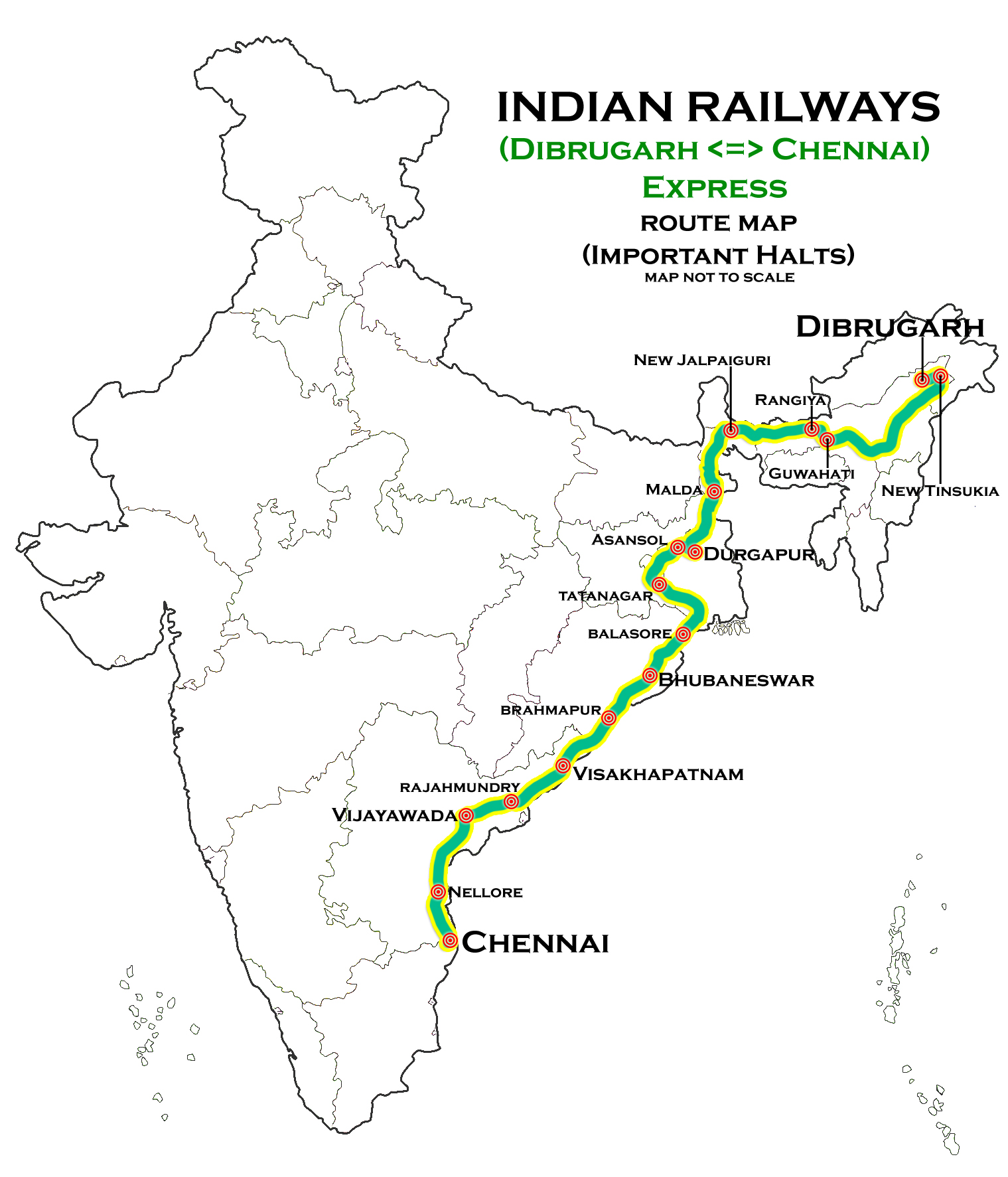
- New Tinsukia–Chennai Tambaram Express Route map

New Tinsukia–Tambaram Weekly Express is a weekly Express train which connects New Tinsukia Junction railway station in Tinsukia, Assam, with and Tambaram in the South Indian metropolis of Chennai, Tamil Nadu via New Jalpaiguri, Malda Town, Rampurhat, Asansol. This train travels a total distance of 3175 km.

== Time-table ==
- Train no. 15930 from New Tinsukia to Tambaram
- Train no. 15929 from Tambaram to New Tinsukia

The train leaves New Tinsukia on every Sunday at 23:45 P.M. and arrives Tambaram on Wednesday at 21:15 P.M. traversing a distance of 3354 kilometres in 69 hours and 30 minutes.

== Schedule ==
Train number	Station code	Departure station	Departure time	Departure day	Arrival station	Arrival time	Arrival day
15929	TBM	Tambaram	11:41 PM (Night)	THU	Dibrugarh	6:00 PM	SUN
15930	MS	Chennai Egmore	8:05 PM	SUN	Tambaram	8:05 PM	WED

== Traction ==
1. DBRG -> RNY – SGUJ/WDP-4/4B/4D
2. RNY - > DGP - HWH/WAP-4
3. DGP -> VSKP – HWH/WAP-4
4. VSKP -> TBM – ED/WAP-4

== Major halts ==
The major halts of this train are as follows-

TAMIL NADU (02 stops)

1. Tambaram
2. Chennai Egmore.

ANDHRA PRADESH (06 stops)

1. Nellore
2. Ongole
3. Vijayawada Junction
4. Eluru
5. Rajahmundry
6. Visakhapatnam

ODISHA (05 stops)

1. Brahmapur
2. Khurda Road Junction
3. Bhubaneswar
4. Cuttack Junction
5. Balasore

WEST BENGAL (17 stops)

1. Hijli
2. Purulia Junction
3. Joychandi Pahar
4. Burnpur
5. Asansol Junction
6. Andal Junction
7. Durgapur
8. Siuri
9. Rampurhat Junction
10. New Farakka Junction
11. Malda Town
12. Dalkhola
13. New Jalpaiguri (Siliguri)
14. New Maynaguri
15. Dhupguri
16. New Cooch Behar Junction
17. New Alipurduar.

JHARKHAND (02 stops)

1. Pakur
2. Tatanagar Junction

BIHAR (02 stops)

1. Barsoi Junction
2. Kishanganj

ASSAM (12 stops)

1. Fakiragram Junction
2. Kokrajhar
3. New Bongaigaon Junction
4. Tihu
5. Rangiya Junction
6. New Missamari
7. Rangapara North Junction
8. Viswanath Charali
9. Harmuti Junction
10. North Lakhimpur
11. Dhemaji
12. Dibrugarh
13. New Tinsukia Junction.

Note: Bold letters indicates Major Railway Stations/Major Cities.

== Reversals ==
DGR/Durgapur and VSKP/Visakhapatnam.

== Major bridges ==
The train passes over some important rivers of India:

1. Creek in Ennore near Chennai
2. Penna river in Nellore
3. Paleru river in Ongole
4. Krishna River in Vijayawada
5. Godavari River in Rajamahendravaram
6. Nagavali River in Srikakulam
7. Vamsadhara River in Srikakulam
8. Rushikulya River in Ganjam
9. Mahanadi river in Cuttack
10. Kathjori river (Mahanadi distributary) in Cuttack
11. Kuakhai River (Mahanadi distributary) near Barang
12. Birupa River (Mahanadi distributary) near Kendrapara
13. Brahmani River in Jenapur
14. Baitarani River in Jajpur Keonjhar Rd.
15. Budhabalanga River in Balasore
16. Subarnarekha River near Jaleswar
17. Kangsabati River near Kharagpur
18. Dwarakeswar River near Bankura
19. Damodar River near Asansol
20. Mayurakshi River near Sainthia
21. Ganges via Farakka Barrage in Farakka
22. Mahananda River near Dumdangi
23. Teesta River near Jalpaiguri
24. Jaldhaka River near Altagram
25. Torsa river near Ghoksadanga
26. Tipkai River near Chautara
27. Gaurang River at Kokrajhar
28. Champabati River near Bongaigaon
29. Manas River near Bongaigaon
30. Beki River at Barpeta Road
31. Baralia River near Rangiya
32. Gabharu River near Missimari
33. Kameng River near Rangapara
34. Ranganadi River near North Lakhimpur
35. Subansiri River near Gogamukh
36. Bogibeel Bridge on Brahmaputra near Dibrugarh.

== See also ==
- Nagaon Express
- Chennai–New Jalpaiguri Superfast Express
- Guwahati–Bengaluru Cantt. Superfast Express
- Thiruvananthapuram–Silchar Superfast Express
- New Tinsukia–Bengaluru Weekly Express
- Bangalore Cantonment–Agartala Humsafar Express
