= Viswanath Charali railway station =

Railway station in Assam, India

Viswanath Charali
- Indian Railways logo

General information
- Location: Biswanath Chariali, Biswanath district, Assam; India
- Coordinates: 26.7697°N 93.1653°E
- Elevation: 83 metres (272 ft)
- System: Indian Railways station
- Owner: Indian Railways
- Operator: Northeast Frontier Railway
- Line: Rangiya–Murkongselek section
- Platforms: 3
- Tracks: 4
- Connections: Auto stand

Construction
- Structure type: At grade
- Parking: No
- Cycle facilities: No

Other information
- Status: Single diesel line
- Station code: VNE
- Zone(s): Northeast Frontier
- Division(s): Rangiya

Services
Preceding station	Indian Railways	Following station
Niz Chatia towards Rangiya Junction	Northeast Frontier Railway zone Rangiya–Murkongselek section	Monabari towards Murkongselek
Location
- Location within Assam Location within India

Viswanath Charali railway station is a main railway station in Biswanath Chariali, Assam. Its code is VNE. It serves Biswanath Chariali town. The station consists of three platforms. The station has been upgraded to a standard Class III Station.

== Major trains ==
- New Tinsukia–Tambaram Weekly Express
- Dibrugarh–Howrah Kamrup Express Via Rangapara North
- Dibrugarh - Deogarh Express
- Naharlagun–Guwahati Shatabdi Express
- Naharlagun–Shokhüvi Donyi Polo Express
- Kamakhya–Murkongselek Lachit Express
- Guwahati–North Lakhimpur Jan Shatabdi Express
- Dekargaon–Murkongselek Passenger
- Rangiya–Murkongselek Passenger
- Rangiya–Murkongselek Special Passenger
