= North Lakhimpur railway station =

Railway station in Assam

North Lakhimpur

General information
- Location: Old College Road, North Lakhimpur, Assam; India
- Coordinates: 27.2543°N 94.1108°E
- Elevation: 92 metres (302 ft)
- System: Indian Railways station
- Owner: Indian Railways
- Operator: Northeast Frontier Railway
- Line: Rangia–Murkongselek section
- Platforms: 3
- Tracks: 5
- Connections: Auto stand

Construction
- Structure type: Standard (on-ground station)
- Parking: Yes
- Cycle facilities: no

Other information
- Status: Single diesel line
- Station code: NLP
- Zone(s): Northeast Frontier Railway
- Division(s): Rangiya

Services
Preceding station	Indian Railways	Following station
Silanibari towards ?	Northeast Frontier Railway zone Rangia–Murkongselek section	Lilabari towards ?
Location
- Location within Assam Location within India

North Lakhimpur railway station is a main railway station in Lakhimpur district, Assam. Its code is NLP. It serves North Lakhimpur city. The station consists of three platforms. The station is considered as Gateway to Arunachal.

== Major trains ==
- Dibrugarh Rajdhani Express via Rangapara North
- New Tinsukia–Tambaram Weekly Express
- Dibrugarh–Howrah Kamrup Express Via Rangapara North
- Dibrugarh - Deogarh Express
- Kamakhya–Murkongselek Lachit Express
- Dekargaon–Murkongselek Passenger
- Murkeongselek–Rangiya Passenger
