= Murkongselek–Pasighat line =

Murkongselek–Pasighat railway section

Overview
- Status: Under construction
- Owner: Indian Railways
- Locale: Assam and Arunachal Pradesh, India
- Termini: Murkongselek; Pasighat
- Stations: Murkongselek, Sille, Labo, Pasighat

Service
- Operator: Northeast Frontier Railway

History
- Opened: (partially completed; under construction)

Technical
- Track length: 26.15 km
- Track gauge: Broad gauge (1,676 mm)

The Murkongselek–Pasighat railway section is a broad-gauge new line project under the Northeast Frontier Railway zone of Indian Railways connecting Murkongselek in Assam to Pasighat in Arunachal Pradesh, India. The 26.15 km railway line is being constructed to extend rail connectivity from the existing network in Assam into Arunachal Pradesh, improving transportation, fostering economic development in the region, and supporting strategic infrastructure expansion in the northeastern frontier of India.

== History ==
Rail connectivity in the region historically ended at Murkongselek, which is part of the Rangiya–Murkongselek section in Assam and just 2 km from Arunachal Pradesh border. Extension of railway lines into Arunachal Pradesh was a long-standing priority aimed at integrating remote districts with the national railway network. The Murkongselek–Pasighat railway project was sanctioned as part of these strategic connectivity initiatives and has been implemented in phases.

The project was sanctioned to strengthen regional transport links, promote tourism and economic activity, and provide a reliable alternative to road travel in a region prone to seasonal disruption due to monsoon and rugged terrain. Construction milestones have been reported incrementally, with significant progress announced in 2025 and 2026.

== Route ==
The line begins at Murkongselek in Assam's Dhemaji district, just 2 km from Arunachal Pradesh border and proceeds north-east into East Siang district of Arunachal Pradesh, terminating at Pasighat. It is being constructed in two primary segments:

1. Phase I – Murkongselek to Sille (15.60 km): The railway line from Murkongselek to Sille in Arunachal Pradesh and the Sille railway station have commissioned in February 2026.
1. Phase II – Sille to Pasighat (10.55 km): Formation and bridge construction are underway, with ancillary structures such as road overbridges and station yard works in progress. Most of the work has been completed. Pasighat railway station is planned to be commissioned by the end of 2026.

The line will also have a halt station at Labo.

== Construction and Progress ==
As of April 2025, the project had achieved approximately 45% physical progress, with an estimated cost exceeding ₹1,252 crore.

In February 2026, Murkongselek–Sille section was completed and operationalised. The overall project had reached around 60% physical progress, remaining Sille-Pasighat 10.55 km section will be completed by December 2026 on which the track linking, ballast laying, bridge works, and station infrastructure development toward Pasighat are ongoing.

== Strategic Importance ==
The project forms part of Indian Railways’ broader initiative to enhance infrastructure in northeastern India. Improved rail connectivity is expected to support regional economic development, tourism, and logistical mobility in Arunachal Pradesh, particularly in areas close to the international border.

== Stations ==
- Murkongselek – Existing station on the Rangiya–Murkongselek section in Assam.
- Sille – Intermediate station commissioned in February 2026.
- Labo – Intermediate "halt" station.
- Pasighat – Terminus in Arunachal Pradesh.

== See also ==
- Northeast Frontier Railway
- Indian Railways
- Rangiya–Murkongselek section

== Categories ==
- Category:Railway lines in India
- Category:Transport in Arunachal Pradesh
- Category:Proposed railway lines in India
- Category:Northeast Frontier Railway
