= Dhemaji railway station =

Railway station in Dhemaji, Assam, India

Dhemaji Railway Station

General information
- Location: Dhemaji, Dhemaji district, Assam; India
- Coordinates: 27.4894°N 94.5426°E
- Elevation: 105 metres (344 ft)
- System: Indian Railways station
- Owner: Indian Railways
- Operator: Northeast Frontier Railway
- Line: Rangiya–Murkongselek section
- Platforms: 2
- Tracks: 3
- Connections: Auto stand

Construction
- Structure type: Standard (on ground station)
- Parking: No
- Cycle facilities: No
- Accessible: Yes

Other information
- Status: Functioning
- Station code: DMC
- Zone(s): Northeast Frontier Railway
- Division(s): Rangiya

History
- Rebuilt: 2015
Location
- Location within Assam Location within India

Dhemaji Railway Station is the main railway station in Dhemaji district, Assam. Its code is DMC. It serves Dhemaji town and places near it. The station consists of two platforms and 3 tracks.

== Major trains ==
- Dibrugarh Rajdhani Express via Rangapara North
- Kamrup Express via Rangapara North (15961/15962)
- Kamakhya–Murkongselek Lachit Express
- Dibrugarh - Deogarh Express
- Rangiya–Murkongselek Passenger
- Dekargaon–Murkongselek Passenger
