= Khandikar railway station =

Railway station in Assam

Khandikar Railway Station

General information
- Location: Murara, Khandikar, Baksa district, Assam; India
- Coordinates: 26.463321°N 91.642769°E
- Elevation: 61 metres (200 ft)
- System: Indian Railways station
- Owner: Indian Railways
- Operator: Northeast Frontier Railway
- Line: Rangiya–Murkongselek section
- Platforms: 2
- Tracks: 1

Construction
- Structure type: Standard (on ground station)
- Parking: No
- Cycle facilities: No

Other information
- Status: Single diesel line
- Station code: KYO
- Zone(s): Northeast Frontier Railway
- Division(s): Rangiya

History
- Rebuilt: 2015

Services
Preceding station	Indian Railways	Following station
Rangiya towards ?	Northeast Frontier Railway zone Rangiya–Murkongselek section	Goreswar towards ?
Location
- Location within Assam Location within India

Khandikar railway station is a railway station on Rangiya–Murkongselek section under Rangiya railway division of Northeast Frontier Railway zone. This railway station is situated at Murara, Khandikar in Baksa district in the Indian state of Assam.
