= Goreswar railway station =

Railway station in Assam

Goreswar Railway Station

General information
- Location: Baihata-Goreswar Road; Goreswar, Baksa district, Assam; India
- Coordinates: 26.526056°N 91.720467°E
- Elevation: 64 metres (210 ft)
- System: Indian Railways station
- Owner: Indian Railways
- Operator: Northeast Frontier Railway
- Line: Rangiya–Murkongselek section
- Platforms: 2
- Tracks: 1

Construction
- Structure type: Standard (on ground station)
- Parking: No
- Cycle facilities: No

Other information
- Status: Single diesel line
- Station code: GVR
- Zone(s): Northeast Frontier Railway
- Division(s): Rangiya

History
- Rebuilt: 2015

Services
Preceding station	Indian Railways	Following station
Khandikar towards ?	Northeast Frontier Railway zone Rangiya–Murkongselek section	Khoirabari towards ?
Location
- Location within Assam Location within India

Goreswar railway station is a railway station on Rangiya–Murkongselek section under Rangiya railway division of Northeast Frontier Railway zone. This railway station is situated beside Baihata-Goreswar Road at Goreswar in Baksa district in the Indian state of Assam.
