= Harisinga Railway Station =

Railway station in Assam

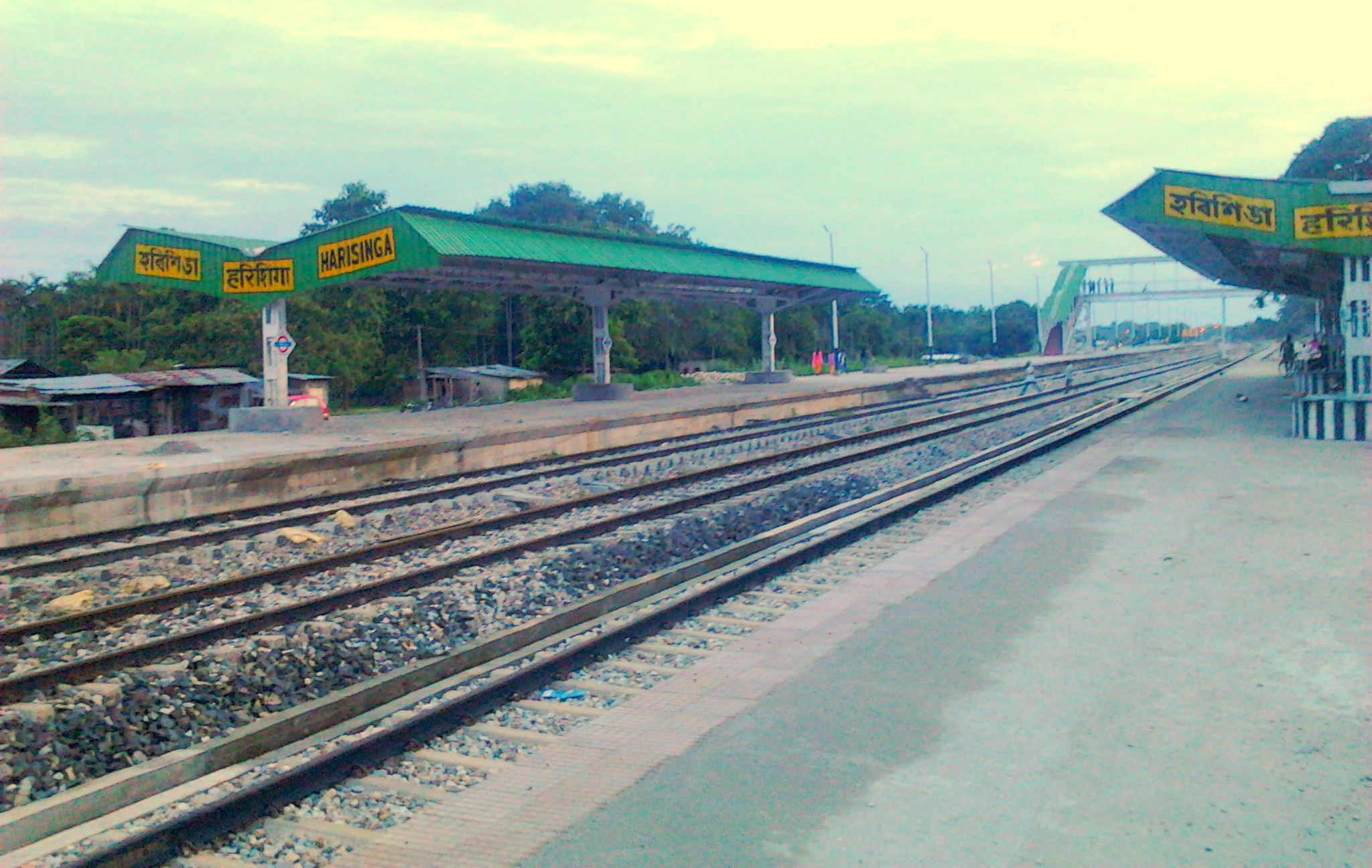
- Harisinga railway station platform

General information
- Location: Harisinga Doulguri Road, Merbangchuba, Harisinga, Udalguri district, Assam; India
- Coordinates: 26.72438°N 91.985001°E
- Elevation: 97 metres (318 ft)
- System: Indian Railways station
- Owner: Indian Railways
- Operator: Northeast Frontier Railway
- Line: Rangiya–Murkongselek section
- Platforms: 2
- Tracks: 1

Construction
- Structure type: At grade
- Parking: No
- Cycle facilities: No

Other information
- Status: Single diesel line
- Station code: HRSN
- Zone(s): Northeast Frontier
- Division(s): Rangiya

History
- Rebuilt: 2015

Services
Preceding station	Indian Railways	Following station
Tangla towards ?	Northeast Frontier Railway zone Rangiya–Murkongselek section	Udalguri towards ?
Location
- Location within Assam Location within India

Harisinga Railway Station is a railway station on Rangiya–Murkongselek section under Rangiya railway division of Northeast Frontier Railway zone. This railway station is situated beside Harisinga Doulguri Road at Merbangchuba, Harisinga in Udalguri district in the Indian state of Assam.
