= Belsiri railway station =

Railway station in India

Belsiri Railway Station

General information
- Location: Belsiri, Sonitpur district, Assam; India
- Coordinates: 26.800481°N 92.514463°E
- Elevation: 95 metres (312 ft)
- System: Indian Railways station
- Owner: Indian Railways
- Operator: Northeast Frontier Railway
- Line: Rangiya–Murkongselek section
- Platforms: 1
- Tracks: 1

Construction
- Structure type: Standard (on ground station)
- Parking: No
- Cycle facilities: No

Other information
- Status: Single diesel line
- Station code: BLRE
- Zone(s): Northeast Frontier Railway
- Division(s): Rangiya

History
- Rebuilt: 2015

Services
Preceding station	Indian Railways	Following station
Dhekiajuli Road towards ?	Northeast Frontier Railway zone Rangiya–Murkongselek section	New Missamari towards ?
Location
- Location within Assam Location within India

Belsiri Railway Station is a railway station on Rangiya–Murkongselek section under Rangiya railway division of Northeast Frontier Railway zone. This railway station is situated at Belsiri in Sonitpur district in the Indian state of Assam.
