= Dhekiajuli Road railway station =

Railway station in Assam

Dhekiajuli Road Railway Station

General information
- Location: New Misamari, Dhekiajuli, Sonitpur district, Assam; India
- Coordinates: 26.809214°N 92.452548°E
- Elevation: 111 metres (364 ft)
- System: Indian Railways station
- Owner: Indian Railways
- Operator: Northeast Frontier Railway
- Line: Rangiya–Murkongselek section
- Platforms: 2
- Tracks: 3

Construction
- Structure type: Standard (on ground station)
- Parking: No
- Cycle facilities: No

Other information
- Status: Active
- Station code: DKJR
- Zone(s): Northeast Frontier Railway
- Division(s): Rangiya

History
- Rebuilt: 2015

Services
Preceding station	Indian Railways	Following station
Hugrajuli towards ?	Northeast Frontier Railway zone Rangiya–Murkongselek section	Belsiri towards ?
Location
- Location within Assam Location within India

Dhekiajuli Road Railway Station is a railway station on Rangiya–Murkongselek section under Rangiya railway division of Northeast Frontier Railway zone. This railway station is situated at New Misamari, Dhekiajuli in Sonitpur district in the Indian state of Assam.
