= Kamakhya–Murkongselek Lachit Express =

Express train in India

Guwahati–Murkongselek Lachit Express
Overview
- Service type: Express
- Locale: Assam
- First service: 11 August 2015; 10 years ago
- Current operator: Northeast Frontier Railway

Route
- Termini: Kamakhya Junction (KYQ); Murkongselek (MZS)
- Stops: 22
- Distance travelled: 490 km (300 mi)
- Average journey time: 12 hours 5 minutes
- Service frequency: Daily (Note: Runs seven days in a week for every direction.)
- Train number: 15613/15614

On-board services
- Classes: AC 2 Tier, AC 3 Tier, Sleeper 3 Tier, Unreserved
- Seating arrangements: No
- Sleeping arrangements: Yes
- Catering facilities: No
- Observation facilities: ICF coach
- Entertainment facilities: No
- Baggage facilities: Below the seats

Technical
- Rolling stock: 2
- Track gauge: 1,676 mm (5 ft 6 in)
- Electrification: No
- Operating speed: 43 km/h (27 mph)
Route map
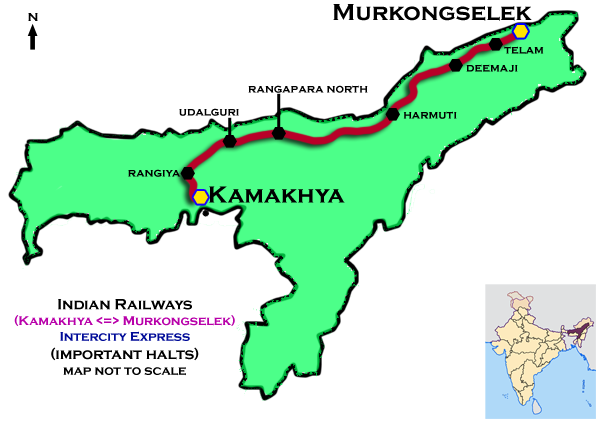

Kamakhya–Murkongselek Lachit Express is an Express train belonging to Northeast Frontier Railway zone that runs between Kamakhya Junction and Murkongselek in India. It is currently being operated with 05613/05614 train numbers on a daily basis.

== Service ==
It averages 39 km/h as 15613 Kamakhya–Murkongselek Intercity Express starts from Kamakhya daily at 18:10 and covering 488 km in 12 hrs 35 mins and 40 km/h as 05613/05614 Murkongselek–Kamakhya Intercity Express starts on Monday and Friday covering 832 km in 12 hrs 10 mins.

== Route and halts ==
- Kamakhya Junction
- Rangiya Junction
- Rangapara North Junction
- Viswanath Charali
- Tatibahar
- Harmuti Junction
- North Lakhimpur
- Gogamukh
- Dhemaji
- Silapathar
- Simen Chapari
- Telam
- Murkongselek

== Coach composition ==
The train consists of 17 coaches:

- 1 AC II Tier
- 2 AC III Tier
- 8 Sleeper coaches
- 3 General
- 2 Second-class Luggage/parcel van

== Traction ==
Both trains are hauled by a New Guwahati Loco Shed or Malda Town Loco Shed-based WDM-3A diesel locomotive from Murkongselek to Guwahati and vice versa.

== Direction reversal ==
The train reverses its direction once:

- Rangiya Junction

== See also ==
- Kamakhya Junction railway station
- Murkongselek railway station
