= Majbat railway station =

Railway station in Assam

Majbat Railway Station

General information
- Location: Majbat, Udalguri district, Assam; India
- Coordinates: 26.784587°N 92.287814°E
- Elevation: 113 metres (371 ft)
- System: Indian Railways station
- Owner: Indian Railways
- Operator: Northeast Frontier Railway
- Line: Rangiya–Murkongselek section
- Platforms: 2
- Tracks: 1

Construction
- Structure type: Standard (on ground station)
- Parking: No
- Cycle facilities: No

Other information
- Status: Single diesel line
- Station code: MJBT
- Zone(s): Northeast Frontier Railway
- Division(s): Rangiya

History
- Rebuilt: 2015

Services
| Preceding station | Indian Railways | Following station |
|---|---|---|
| Rowta Bagan towards ? | Northeast Frontier Railway zone Rangiya–Murkongselek section | Hugrajuli towards ? |
Location
- Location within Assam Location within India

Majbat railway station is a railway station on Rangiya–Murkongselek section under Rangiya railway division of Northeast Frontier Railway zone. This railway station is situated at Majbat in Udalguri district in the Indian state of Assam.
