= Boro Baptist Convention =

Boro Baptist Convention (BBC)
- Abbreviation: BBC
- Classification: Baptist
- Theology: Evangelical
- Associations: North Bank Baptist Christian Association
- Language: Boro
- Headquarters: Harisinga in Udalguri District, Bodoland, India
- Founder: Baptist General Conference, USA
- Origin: 2003
- Members: 52,000
- Places of worship: 354

Boro Baptist Convention or BBC is a Baptist churches convention based in Assam, India, with more than 52,000 members and 354 congregations as of 2014. The Boro Baptist Convention was established in 1914 and completed its centenary celebrations in 2014. It has its headquarters at Harisinga in Udalguri District of Bodoland, Assam. It is affiliated to the North Bank Baptist Christian Association. The Union is made primarily of Bodo people, an indigenous ethnic group of Assam.

== History ==
In 1914 Rev. George Richard Kampfer of the American Baptist Foreign Mission Society (ABFMS) who was stationed in Guwahati came to Borigaon and established the first Baptist church. It was in the year 1914 under the guidance of Rev. Kampfer, the Baptist churches of Udalguri district (then Mangaldai Sub division) of Assam came together unitedly and formed a Christian Organization called "Mangaldai Baptist Christian Association". At the time of formation there were only 5 churches. In the year 1983 when Darrang district was divided into two districts by the government it was in that pattern the association was renamed as "Darrang Baptist Christian Association". Again while the Bodoland Territorial Council was created by the Central government as separate administration for the Boros it was then called "Boro Baptist Convention" in 2003.

The American Baptist Foreign Mission Society (ABFMS) missionaries were in charge of the "Mangaldai Baptist Christian Association" (MBCA) till 1945 when they handed over the MBCA to the Baptist General Conference, USA. Rev. Johnson of the Baptist General Conference built the present mission center at Harisinga. The Harisinga Mission school was developed and the Baptist Christian Hospital was constructed. The missionaries left in 1969 and handed over the administration of the association to the locals. As of 2014, the convention had 92 full-time workers including departmental secretaries.

== Organization ==
The Boro Baptist Convention has a General Council and an Executive Committee. They oversee the work of the other departments of the convention which are:

- Church Growth Department
- Mission and Evangelism Department
- Christian Education Department
- Women Department
- Youth Department
- Prayer Department
- General Education Department
- Zion Bible College
- Relief and Development

== Education ==
=== Diamond English School ===
Diamon English School, Udalguri was established in 1989 in commemoration of the Diamond jubilee of the then Darrang Baptist Christian association.

== Zion Bible College ==
Zion Bible college has been offering G.Th and B.Th courses over the years.

== See also ==
- Council of Baptist Churches in Northeast India
- North East India Christian Council
- List of Christian denominations in North East India
- Boro Baptist Church Association
- Baptist World Alliance
- Rabha Baptist Convention
