= New Missamari railway station =

Railway station in Assam

New Missamari Railway Station

General information
- Location: Missamari, Sonitpur district, Assam; India
- Coordinates: 26.8108039°N 92.577544°E
- Elevation: 94 metres (308 ft)
- System: Indian Railways station
- Owner: Indian Railways
- Operator: Northeast Frontier Railway
- Line: Rangiya–Murkongselek section
- Platforms: 3
- Tracks: 1

Construction
- Structure type: Standard (on ground station)
- Parking: No
- Cycle facilities: No

Other information
- Status: Single diesel line
- Station code: NMM
- Zone(s): Northeast Frontier Railway
- Division(s): Rangiya

History
- Rebuilt: 2015
- Electrified: Ongoing

Services
Preceding station	Indian Railways	Following station
Belsiri towards ?	Northeast Frontier Railway zone Rangiya–Murkongselek section	Misamari towards ?
Location
- Location within Assam Location within India

New Missamari Railway Station is a railway station on Rangiya–Murkongselek section under Rangiya railway division of Northeast Frontier Railway zone. This railway station is situated at Missamari in Sonitpur district in the Indian state of Assam.

== Major Trains ==
1. New Delhi–Dibrugarh Rajdhani Express (Via Rangapara North)
2. Naharlagun–Guwahati Shatabdi Express
3. New Tinsukia–Chennai Tambaram Express
4. Guwahati–Dekargaon Intercity Express
