= Naharlagun railway station =

Railway station in Arunachal Pradesh

Naharlagun

General information
- Location: Naharlagun, Yupia Road, Arunachal Pradesh; India
- Coordinates: 27°06′11″N 93°42′03″E
- Elevation: 138 m (453 ft)
- System: Regional rail and Light rail station
- Owner: Indian Railways
- Operator: Northeast Frontier Railway
- Line: Harmuti-Naharlagun section
- Platforms: 3

Construction
- Structure type: Standard
- Parking: Yes

Other information
- Status: Functioning
- Station code: NHLN
- Zone(s): Northeast Frontier Railway
- Division(s): Rangiya

History
- Opened: April 7, 2014; 12 years ago
Location
- Location within Arunachal Pradesh

Naharlagun railway station is a railway station located in Papum Pare district of Arunachal Pradesh. It is about 15 kilometres (9.3 mi) to the state capital Itanagar.

== History ==
Initial survey for the first rail link to Arunachal, Harmuti–Naharlagun line, was conducted in 1997 and the project was sanctioned in 1996–97 Railway Budget as a metre-gauge line. The engine trial run was completed on 15 October 2012, but the railway station and line were operationalised on 7 April 2014. On the same day a Naharlagun–Dekargaon Passenger was inaugurated.

== Facilities ==
The station has three platforms.

== Trains ==
The trains originating/halting at Naharlagun are as follows:

1. 15618/ Naharlagun–Shokhüvi Donyi Polo Express
2. 22411/ Naharlagun–Anand Vihar Terminal Arunachal AC SF Express
3. 12087/ Naharlagun–Guwahati Shatabdi Express
4. 15908/ Naharlagun–Tinsukia Intercity Express
5. Naharlagun – Dekargaon Passenger
6. 19525/26 Hapa (HAPA) - Naharlagun (NHLN) Express. Starting from 23 September 2026.

== Railway in Arunachal ==
=== Existing ===
Existing operational rail lines are.

- Harmuti–Naharlagun line, 20 km from Harmuti in Assam to Naharlagun near Itanagar in Arunachal, is operational and electrified. Initial survey was conducted in 1997 and the project was sanctioned in 1996–97 Railway Budget as a metre-gauge line. The engine trial run was completed on 15 October 2012, but the railway station and line were operationalised on 7 April 2014. On the same day a Naharlagun–Dekargaon Passenger was inaugurated.
- Dekargaon–Bhalukpong Line, 63 km operational line continues to provide vital rail access to the western part of Arunachal Pradesh, connecting Bhalukpong on Arunachal-Assam border with the broader Indian railway network.

=== Under-construction ===
These lines have been sanctioned, and active physical construction work is ongoing.

- Tinsukia–Dambuk line, ~300 km via Tinsukia (Longpatia)–Pasighat via Kanubari, Deomali, Lekhapani, Jairampur, Kharsang, Miao, Diyun, Tezu, Bhishmaknagar, Roing, and Dambuk, survey under progress as of Feb 2023.

  - Murkongselek–Sille-Pasighat line (subset of above), 26.15 km long, 45% complete and major progress made particularly in Phase-I Murkongselek-Sille with whole project on target for completion by February 2026 (30 April 2025 update).

- Bhalukpong–Tawang line, INR 70,000 crore ~201.46 km long link declared as the "Strategic Project" involves extensive tunneling for estimated 80% of the route, Detailed Project Report (DPR) completed and submitted to the Ministry of Defence on Feb 2023 but no physical construction has yet commenced as of July 2025.

- Lakhimpur-Bame-Silapathar line, ~ 96.02 km link via North Lakhimpur–Bame–Aalo–Silapathar has been declared "strategic project", survey and Detailed Project Report (DPR) completed in Feb 2023 but no further progress as of July 2025.

- Pasighat–Tezu–Parshuram Kund–Rupai line, ~217.83 km, Detailed Project Report (DPR) completed but awaiting funding approval with no timelines announced as of July 2025.

- Lekhapani–Deban line, 71.85 km via Nampong, survey completed but declared financially unviable thus no further progress as of July 2025.

- Naharkatia–Deomali line, ₹1260.13 crore 21.13 km link, survey completed but no progress made due to financial unviability as of July 2025.

- Itakhola–Seijosa line, 18 km, survey completed by 2018, but no further progress made as of July 2025.

- Dumduma–Namsai–Wakro line, 96 km, survey completed in 2018, but no progress made as of July 2025.

- Dangri–Roing line, 60 km, survey completed in 2018, but no further progress as of July 2025.

== See also ==
- North Eastern Railway Connectivity Project
- India–China Border Roads
