= Rangapara =

- town
- Location in Assam, India Rangapara (India)
- Coordinates: 26.82°N 92.65°E
- Country: India
- State: Assam
- District: Sonitpur

Government
  - Type: Municipal Board
- Elevation: 206 m (676 ft)

Population (2003)
  - Total: 18,822
  - Rank: 22

Languages
  - Official: Assamese
- Time zone: UTC+5:30 (IST)
- 784505 PIN -->: 784505
- ISO 3166 code: IN-AS
- Vehicle registration: AS 12

Rangapara (IPA: ˈræŋgəˌpɑːrə) is a small town and a municipal board in Sonitpur district in the Indian state of Assam.

== Demographics ==
As of 2001 India census, Rangapara had a population of 18,822. Males constitute 54% of the population and females 46%. Rangapara has an average literacy rate of 76%, higher than the national average of 59.5%: male literacy is 81%, and female literacy is 70%. In Rangapara, 10% of the population is under 6 years of age.

=== Language ===
Languages spoken in Rangapara (2011)
1. Bengali (46.7%)
2. Hindi (21.5%)
3. Assamese (13.7%)
4. others (18.1%)

Bengali is the most spoken language at 8,785 speakers, followed by Hindi at 4,043 and Assamese is spoken by 2,583 people.

== Geography ==
Rangapara is located at 26.82°N 92.65°E. It has an average elevation of 206 metres (675 feet).

== Politics ==
Rangapara is part of Tezpur (Lok Sabha constituency). Also an important legislative constituency of the state.

== Transport ==
The Rangapara North Junction which lies on the Rangiya–Murkongselek section has trains to Kamakhya Junction, New Jalpaiguri Junction, Dekargaon, Rangiya Junction, New Delhi and Naharlagun.Dibrugarh, Howrah and Tambaram.
