= Udalguri =

- Town
- Location in Assam, India Udalguri (India)
- Coordinates: 26.7452°N 92.0962°E
- Country: India
- State: Assam
- District: Udalguri district

Government
  - Body: Udalguri Municipal Board

Area
  - Total: 4.69 km^{2} (1.81 sq mi)
- Elevation: 180 m (590 ft)

Population (2011)
  - Total: 15,279
  - Density: 3,260/km^{2} (8,440/sq mi)
- Time zone: UTC+5:30 (IST)
- PIN: 784509
- Telephone code: 03711 XXXXXX
- Vehicle registration: AS-27
- Website: udalguri.assam.gov.in

Udalguri is a small town and the headquarters of Udalguri district under the jurisdiction of Bodoland Territorial Council which controls the Bodoland Territorial Region in the state of Assam.

== Demographics ==
Religion in Udalguri town (2011)
1. Hindu (88.9%)
2. Christian (9.27%)
3. Muslim (1.67%)
4. others (0.18%)

As per 2011 census, population of Udalguri town was 15,279. Literacy rate of Udalguri town was 88.33%.

=== Language ===
Languages spoken in Udalguri (2011)
1. Assamese (49.7%)
2. Bengali (17.0%)
3. Bodo (16.0%)
4. Hindi (9.20%)
5. others (9.16%)

Assamese is the most spoken language at 7,590 speakers, followed by Bengali at 2,598, Bodo is spoken by 2,440 people and Hindi at 1,405.

== Transport ==
Udalguri is the main railway station of Udalguri town. Udalguri railway station is a railway station on Rangiya–Murkongselek section under Rangiya railway division of Northeast Frontier Railway zone.

== Politics ==
Udalguri is part of Mangaldoi (Lok Sabha constituency).
