= Rowta Bagan railway station =

Railway station in Assam

Rowta Bagan Railway Station

General information
- Location: Bajarajhar, Rowta Bagan, Udalguri district, Assam; India
- Coordinates: 26.736799°N 92.21491°E
- Elevation: 103 metres (338 ft)
- System: Indian Railways station
- Owner: Indian Railways
- Operator: Northeast Frontier Railway
- Line: Rangiya–Murkongselek section
- Platforms: 2
- Tracks: 1

Construction
- Structure type: At grade
- Parking: No
- Cycle facilities: No

Other information
- Status: Single diesel line
- Station code: RWTB
- Zone(s): Northeast Frontier
- Division(s): Rangiya

History
- Rebuilt: 2015

Services
Preceding station	Indian Railways	Following station
Udalguri towards ?	Northeast Frontier Railway zone Rangiya–Murkongselek section	Majbat towards ?
Location
- Location within Assam Location within India

Rowta Bagan railway station is a railway station on Rangiya–Murkongselek section under Rangiya railway division of Northeast Frontier Railway zone. This railway station is situated at Bajarajhar, Rowta Bagan in Udalguri district in the Indian state of Assam.
