= Donyi Polo Express =

Naharlagun–Shokhüvi Donyi Polo Express
Overview
- Service type: Intercity
- Status: Operational
- Locale: Arunachal Pradesh, Assam, Nagaland
- First service: 20 February 2015; 11 years ago
- Current operator: Northeast Frontier Railway

Route
- Termini: Naharlagun (NHLN); Shokhüvi (SKHV)
- Stops: 12
- Distance travelled: 578 km (359 mi)
- Average journey time: 13 hours 10 minutes
- Service frequency: Daily
- Train number: 15817 / 15818

On-board services
- Classes: Sleeper, 3rd AC, 2nd AC
- Sleeping arrangements: Available
- Auto-rack arrangements: No
- Catering facilities: No pantry car On-board catering
- Observation facilities: LHB coach
- Baggage facilities: Yes

Technical
- Rolling stock: LHB coach
- Track gauge: 1,676 mm (5 ft 6 in)
- Operating speed: 57.35 km/h (36 mph)
Route map
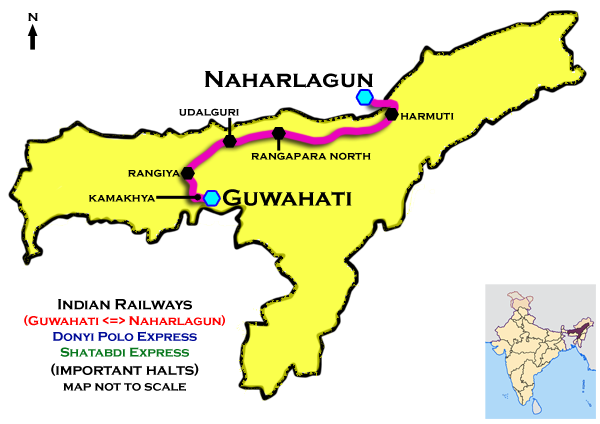

The 15617 / 15618 Naharlagun–Shokhüvi Donyi Polo Express previously known as Naharlagun–Guwahati Intercity Express is a daily Intercity Express of the Indian Railways, which runs between Shokhüvi in Nagaland and Naharlagun in Arunachal Pradesh.

== Stops ==
- Shokhüvi railway station
- Diphu railway station
- Lumding railway station
- Hojai railway station
- Chaparmukh railway station
- Guwahati railway station
- Kamakhya Junction railway station
- Changsari railway station
- Rangiya Junction railway station
- Tangla railway station
- Udalguri railway station
- Rangapara North Junction railway station
- Biswanath Charali railway station
- Gohpur railway station
- Tatibahar railway station
- Harmuti Junction railway station
- Gumto railway station
- Naharlagun railway station

== Locomotive ==
The train is hauled by WDM-3A diesel locomotive of the Malda Shed.

== Coach composition ==
The train consists of 15 LHB coach as follows:

- 2 SLR
- 8 Sleeper coach
- 3 AC Three Tier
- 1 AC Two Tier
- 1 AC 1st Class cum Two Tier
