= Jonai =

Jonai জ'নাই
- Co-District
- Co-District Administration, Jonai
- Nickname: Jonai Bazar
- Location within Assam
- Coordinates: 27.83°N 95.22°E
- Country: India
- State: Assam
- District: Dhemaji District
- Established: 2 February 1972

Government
  - Type: Sub-District
  - Body: Co-District Administration, Jonai/(Co- District Commissioner)

Area
  - Total: 1,181.2 km^{2} (456.1 sq mi)

Ethnicities
  - Mising, Assamese, Nepali: Mising 80% approx
- Time zone: UTC+5:30 (IST)
- PIN: 787060
- Vehicle registration: AS 22

Jonai is the easternmost Co-District of Dhemaji District in India's Assam State, about 554 kilometers away from the state capital, Dispur. It covers a total area of 1181.2 sq. km. and is bounded by Arunachal Pradesh in the north, Lali and Brahmaputra River in the south, Sipiya river and Sadiya Subdivision of Tinsukia district in the east, and Simen River in the west. The Co-District has the easternmost railway station of the Indian Railways, called Murkongselek railway station, in Dhemaji District. Its local residents are the Mising, Assamese and Gorkha. Some tourist attractions include the Poba Wildlife Sanctuary, which is located 3 miles away.

== Etymology ==
The name Jonai is derived from Jona, a Chutia princess who married off to Kansan, a Kachari prince. As per folklore, due to hardship, the Kachari prince and his 900 men left his kingdom and came upon the Chutia kingdom. The Chutia princess having heard about this encroachment ordered her soldiers to make the prince and his followers captive and to bring them to the royal court in Sadiya. Later, as events turned out, the princess fell in love with the prince, and she was married off to him and they settled in Jonai. The other followers too married local women. The Sonowal Kacharis are thought to be descendants of this group of people and recall the queen as Jonadoi Ai.

== Demographics ==
Jonai is the easternmost sub-division of Dhemaji District, about 554 km from the state capital, Guwahati. It is located at 27.83°N, 95.22°E. Covering a total Geographical area of 1,111.81 km^{2}, it is bounded by Arunachal Pradesh in the north, Lali & Brahmaputra River in the south, Sipiya river & Sadiya Subdivision of Tinsukia district in the east and Simen River in the west. The headquarters is at 27.770°N, 95.160°E. The Sub-division comprises one Development Block named by Murkong Selek Tribal Development Block, One Revenue Circle named by Jonai Revenue Circle and 15 Nos. of Gaon Panchayats. According to the 2001 census, the population of Jonai is 143,199. Jonai has a literacy rate of 64.9% according to the census 2001.

== Governance ==
Jonai is part of Lakhimpur (Lok Sabha constituency). Jonai is a Vidhan Sabha Constituency. It has its own Member of the Legislative Assembly (MLA), which is a reserved seat for Schedule Tribe. Jonai comes under the Mising Autonomous Council (MAC) area. The most popular political parties are Indian National Congress (INC), Sanmilita Ganasakthi Asom (SGSA), Bharatiya Janata Party (BJP), and Asom Gana Parishad (AGP).

Jonai connects to the rest of the country through National Highway No.515 (previously 52) It is the last railway station of the Indian Railways which stretches towards the east. The name of the railway station is Murkongselek.

== People ==
Jonai is mostly inhabited by the Mising people, an indigenous community. About 85% of inhabitants of Jonai are Mishing community and only 15% belong to other communities according to 2011 census of India. Ali Ai Ligang is a local festival in Jonai. On that day, they prepare a local homemade rice beer known as "Apong", available in two varieties i.e., Nogin and Po:Ro. On the eve of Ali Ai Ligang, the Mishing girls and boys dress in traditional attire . The festival is celebrated by performing gumrag dance and singing oinitom song. Other festivals like Dobur and Porag are mostly celebrated. Agriculture, hand loom weaving and services are the main source of earning among the people here.

== Nature and tourism ==
A forest reserve named Poba is situated on the banks of the river Brahmaputra near 'Tinmile Ghat' and Bogibeel Ghat from where ferry and boat services sail to Dibrugarh. Teenmile Ghat is used as a picnic spot and has a view of the Brahmaputra and a part of the Himalayan Range. There are also other picnic spots surrounding Jonai, in the Arunachal Pradesh area. Tourists are accommodated at the 'Circuit House' and the local government tourist lodge. There are shops in the Jonai Bazar area and some 'watering holes' around town.

== Transport ==
=== Air ===
The nearest airports are Pasighat, Arunachal Pradesh, Lilabari in North Lakhimpur and Mohanbari Airport (Dibrugarh), from which direct flights are available to and from Guwahati and Delhi. Only a few flights are available weekly.

=== Rail ===
Jonai is connected via the Indian Railways network. Murkongselek is the last station in the Northeast Frontier Railway Zone of the Indian Railways. It is being planned to extend it up to Pasighat (Arunachal Pradesh). After that, direct trains from New Delhi would be made available.

=== Road ===
Jonai is also connected by road and is near National Highway 515. The road to Jonai lies through a valley behind the Arunachal hills. Routes are served by buses of the Assam State Transport Corporation (ASTC) and other privately owned buses like Blue Hill Travels, Network Travels, Royal Tours & Travels and maxi cabs, which run from ISBT Guwahati and Paltan Bazar Guwahati to reach Jonai. It is connected to Arunachal Pradesh through NH 515 and to Dibrugarh through the Bogibeel Bridge. 24 hours bus services are available in the subdivision along with small sumo services.

=== Waterways ===
Ferry and transport services are available at Bogibeel Ghat, about 67 km from Jonai, Tinmile Ghat, about 8 kilometers from Jonai Bazar, and Singajan Ghat (commonly called Majorbari Ghat); about 6 kilometers from Simen Chapori. Due to a lack of medical colleges and good hospitals in Dhemaji, people travel to Dibrugarh via these river ports.

== Climate ==
Climate data for Jonai
Month	Jan	Feb	Mar	Apr	May	Jun	Jul	Aug	Sep	Oct	Nov	Dec	Year
Mean daily maximum °C (°F)	26.5 (79.7)	28.5 (83.3)	31.7 (89.1)	33.0 (91.4)	35.1 (95.2)	36.6 (97.9)	36.6 (97.9)	36.5 (97.7)	36.0 (96.8)	33.5 (92.3)	31.0 (87.8)	27.5 (81.5)	32.7 (90.9)
Mean daily minimum °C (°F)	9.3 (48.7)	10.7 (51.3)	13.5 (56.3)	15.7 (60.3)	18.3 (64.9)	21.3 (70.3)	21.7 (71.1)	21.9 (71.4)	20.9 (69.6)	17.3 (63.1)	14.1 (57.4)	10.7 (51.3)	16.3 (61.3)
Average rainfall mm (inches)	42.8 (1.69)	96.1 (3.78)	144.6 (5.69)	259.5 (10.22)	371.0 (14.61)	847.8 (33.38)	1,081.1 (42.56)	670.6 (26.40)	583.7 (22.98)	231.7 (9.12)	29.1 (1.15)	30.3 (1.19)	4,388.3 (172.77)
Average rainy days	3.7	7.0	10.2	13.0	13.8	19.0	22.0	15.5	15.0	7.6	2.1	2.2	131.1
Source: India Meteorological Department

== Politics ==
Jonai is part of Lakhimpur (Lok Sabha constituency). The sitting MLA is Bhubon Pegu and the sitting MP is Mr. Pradan Barua
