= Gumto railway station =

Railway station in Arunachal Pradesh

Gumto
- Indian Railways logo

General information
- Location: Doimukh–Harmuti Road, Papum Pare, Arunachal Pradesh; India
- Coordinates: 27.1370°N 93.7915°E
- Elevation: 115 metres (377 ft)
- System: Indian Railways station
- Owner: Indian Railways
- Operator: Northeast Frontier
- Platforms: 1
- Tracks: 2 (Single diesel line 5 ft 6 in (1,676 mm) broad gauge)
- Connections: Auto stand

Construction
- Structure type: Standard (on-ground station)
- Parking: Yes
- Cycle facilities: Yes

Other information
- Status: Functioning
- Station code: GMTO
- Zone(s): Northeast Frontier Railway
- Division(s): Rangiya
Location

Gumto railway station is a small railway station in Papum Pare district, Arunachal Pradesh. Its code is GMTO. It serves Gumto town. The station consists of one platform. The platform is not well sheltered. It lacks many facilities including water and sanitation.

== Major trains ==
- Naharlagun–Shokhüvi Donyi Polo Express
