= Rangapara North Junction railway station =

Rail station in Assam, India

Rangapara North Junction
- Indian Railways logo

General information
- Location: Rangapara, Sonitpur district, Assam; India
- Coordinates: 26.8212°N 92.6831°E
- Elevation: 94.20 metres (309.1 ft)
- System: Indian Railways station
- Owner: Indian Railways
- Operator: Northeast Frontier Railway
- Lines: Rangiya–Murkongselek section, Rangapara North–Dekargaon section, Rangapara North-Bhalukpong section
- Platforms: 5
- Tracks: 8
- Connections: Auto stand

Construction
- Structure type: At grade
- Parking: Yes
- Cycle facilities: Yes

Other information
- Status: Functioning
- Station code: RPAN
- Zone(s): Northeast Frontier
- Division(s): Rangiya

History
- Closed: 2011
- Rebuilt: 2011–2014
Location
- Location within Assam Location within India

Rangapara North Junction Railway Station is a main railway station in Sonitpur district, Assam. Its code is RPAN. It serves Rangapara town. The station consists of 5 platforms. This station has been upgraded to a standard B Class Station.

Post gauge conversion station is connected Arunachal Pradesh with Assam pass through the Murkongselek.

== Major trains ==
- New Delhi–Dibrugarh Rajdhani Express (Via Rangapara North)
- Arunachal AC Superfast Express
- New Tinsukia–Tambaram Weekly Express
- Dibrugarh–Howrah Kamrup Express (Via Rangapara North)
- Dibrugarh - Deogarh Express
- Guwahati–Murkongselek Lachit Express
- Naharlagun−Guwahati Shatabdi Express
- Rangiya–Rangapara North Passenger
- Dekargaon–Bhalukpong Passenger
- Guwahati–Dekargaon Intercity Express
- Naharlagun–Shokhüvi Donyi Polo Express
- Rangapara North–Dekargaon Passenger

== See also ==
- North Eastern Railway Connectivity Project
- North Western Railway zone

s==References==
