= Dhemaji =

- Town
- Dhemaji Town
- Location in Assam, India Dhemaji (India)
- Coordinates: 27.48°N 94.58°E
- Country: India
- State: Assam
- District: Dhemaji

Government
  - Body: Dhemaji Municipal Board

Area
  - Total: 12 km^{2} (4.6 sq mi)
- Elevation: 91 m (299 ft)

Population
  - Total: 25,000(Estimated)
  - Density: 2,100/km^{2} (5,400/sq mi)

Languages
  - Official: Assamese
- Time zone: UTC+5:30 (IST)
- Postal code: 787057
- ISO 3166 code: IN-AS
- Vehicle registration: AS 22
- Sex ratio: 1000:915 ♂/♀
- Website: dhemaji.gov.in

Dhemaji is a town and the headquarters of the Dhemaji district in the state of Assam, India. It is situated on the north bank of the Brahmaputra River and serves as an important administrative and commercial centre for the surrounding area. The town is known for its serene environment, traditional Assamese culture, and proximity to natural attractions like hills, rivers and forests.

== Etymology ==
The district's name Dhemaji is derived from the Deori word Dema-ji which means great water indicating it to be a flood-prone region.

== Geography ==
Dhemaji is located at 27.48°N 94.58°E. It has an average elevation of 91 metres (298 feet). Dhemaji is located to the north of the river Brahmaputra. To its north lies the Arunachal Himalayas. To its east lies the state Arunachal Pradesh and to the west is Lakhimpur, a district of Assam. It has many large and small rivers flowing through it. Some of them are Jiadhal, Gainodi, Dikhari, Dihang, Dimow and Simen. The Subansiri River flows by its western border.

== History ==
The area of the present district was under the control of the Chutia Kingdom until it was annexed and made a part of Ahom kingdom in 1524. Ruins of the erstwhile capital are still there but not well preserved. A number of monuments Ghuguha Dol, Ma Manipuri Than, Padumani Than built by the several kings are worth visiting.

Dhemaji became a fully-fledged district on 14 October 1989, when it was split from Lakhimpur district.

== Demographics ==
As of 2011 India census, Dhemaji had a population of 12816. Males constitute 51% of the population and females 49%. Dhemaji has an average literacy rate of 92%, higher than the national average of 59.5%: male literacy is 94% and, female literacy is 89%. In Dhemaji, 11% of the population is under 6 years of age.

=== Language ===
Languages spoken in Dhemaji (2011)
1. Assamese (68.6%)
2. Bengali (16.3%)
3. Mishing (6.96%)
4. Hindi (5.38%)
5. others (2.72%)

Assamese is the most spoken language at 8,794 speakers, followed by Bengali at 2,092, Mishing is spoken by 891 people and Hindi at 690.

== Economy ==
In 2006, the Indian government named Dhemaji one of the country's 250 most backward districts (out of a total of 640). It is one of the eleven districts in Assam currently receiving funds from the Backward Regions Grant Fund Programme (BRGF). During the last 10 years Dhemaji has been witnessing rapid growth in terms of business and education. The economy of Dhemaji is based on agriculture. In the recent decade a growth in the nursery business has been seen in the region under leadership of Mr.Tankeswar Doloi, who has collected more than 100 varieties of orchids and Mr. Ajit Dutta of Asok Nursery who have created work culture through their own individual enterprises in the region. The prominent employment avenue apart from agriculture is the service sector (government jobs, school teachers). Central government schemes for rural development is changing the scene of the district. People now have different options to enrich themselves. The DRDA, Zilla Parishad, Gram Panchayat are flourishing income opportunities to the people as well as the office-bearers of these organizations.

== Transport ==
The National Highway NH15 passes through Dhemaji and goes towards Lahoal via the Bogibeel bridge. Another National Highway, NH515 separates from the NH15 at Kulajan and ends at Pasighat passing through Jonai . In Railways, the town is served by the Dhemaji railway station of tinsukia railway division by its broad-gauge train service and provides connectivity to Guwahati, Murkongselek and Tinsukia.

Jiadhal and Gainadi are the most ravaging rivers in this district in terms of floods. Every year floods destroy a bulk of the agricultural proceeds and people take refuge in camps.

The nearest airports to Dhemaji are Lilabari Airport, near North Lakhimpur, 66 km (41 mi) away and Mohanbari Airport, near Dibrugarh, 80 km (50 mi) away.

The Bogibeel Bridge over the Brahmaputra connects Dhemaji with Dibrugarh by road as well as by rail. It was inaugurated by prime minister Narendra Modi on 25 December 2018. The state-highways here are comparatively well-off compared to its neighbouring districts.

== Education ==
Dhemaji has a dozen of schools and colleges.

The names of some notable Colleges, Senior Secondary school and High School of Dhemaji town are :-

A. College :

1.Dhemaji College.

2.Dhemaji Commerce College.

3.Dhemaji City College.

4.Moridhal College.

B. Senior Secondary school :

1. Machkhowa Higher Secondary School

2. Dhemaji Higher Secondary school

3.Dhemaji Girls High School.

4.SFS Jr. College

5.VKV Dhemaji

6.Public Academy

7.Dhemaji Town Jr. College

8.Paramananda Academy

9. JNV Dhemaji

10.Kiran Academy

11. Mother's Pride School, Dhemaji

C. High School :

1.Dhemaji Town High School

2.Dhemaji Public School

3.The Gurukul

4.Sankardev Sisuvidya Niketon

5.Rupnath Brahma High School

6.Suvidya Residential English School

7.Dhemaji Adarsh High School

D. Professional College :

1.Dhemaji PGT College

2.Dhemaji Engineering College

3. I.t.i dhemaji

== Politics ==
Dhemaji is part of Lakhimpur (Lok Sabha constituency). There are two Assembly constituencies in Dhemaji District- Dhemaji and Jonai. Dhemaji district is politically very poor. Community politics is main reason for this. Sarbananda Sonowal of Bharatiya Janata Party was Member of Parliament until May 2016 when he became Chief Minister of Assam. Pradan Baruah of Bharatiya Janata Party is the present Member of Parliament of Lakhimpur Lok Sabha Constituency, Bhubon Pegu an independent M.L.A of Jonai.

Students' organisations such as Takam Mising Porin Kebang, All Assam Students Union, Asom Jatiyatabadi Yuva Chatra Parishad, All Bodo Students Union, National Students' Union of India, All Tai Ahom Students Union, All Assam Students Union, and Krishak Mukti Sangram Samiti(KMSS) are popular.

== Economy ==
=== Banking ===
Strengthening the economy among both rural and urban people, many new banks, both Nationalised Bank i.e. public sector and private-sector banks, have opened their branches in the various rural and urban areas of the district.

- State Bank of India
- Allahabad Bank
- Canara Bank
- Central Bank of India
- IDBI Bank
- UCO Bank
- United Bank of India
- ICICI Bank
- Assam Gramin Vikash Bank
- IDBI Bank
- Axis Bank
- HDFC Bank
