= Jonai Bazar =

- Town
- Nickname: Jonai Town
- Location in Assam, India Jonai Bazar (India)
- Coordinates: 27.832928°N 95.221424°E
- Country: India
- State: Assam
- District: Dhemaji

Government
  - Body: Jonai Bazar Business Union Board

Population (2021)
  - Total: 278,949

Languages
  - Official: Assamese, Mising
- Time zone: UTC+5:30 (IST)
- Vehicle registration: AS22

Jonai Bazar is a major town and Commercial hub of Dhemaji district in the Indian state of Assam. It located in the hurt of Jonai Co - District and 100 KM away from the Headquarter Dhemaji District.

== Demographics ==
As of 2001 India census, Jonai Bazar had a population of 5172. Males constitute 53% of the population and females 47%. Jonai Bazar has an average literacy rate of 65%, higher than the national average of 59.5%: male literacy is 74%, and female literacy is 56%. In Jonai Bazar, 16% of the population is under 6 years of age.
