= Goreswar =

- Town
- Location in Assam, India Goreswar (India)
- Coordinates: 26.54°N 91.73°E
- Country: India
- State: Assam
- Region: Western Assam
- District: Tamulpur
- Elevation: 42 m (138 ft)

Languages
  - Official: Bodo, Assamese
- Time zone: UTC+5:30 (IST)
- PIN: 781366
- ISO 3166 code: IN-AS
- Vehicle registration: AS
- Website: baksa.gov.in

Goreswar is a small town in the Tamulpur district (part of erstwhile Kamrup district till 2004), situated in the north bank of the Brahmaputra River, surrounded by Rangiya and Baihata

== Transport ==
The town is located north of National Highway 31 and well connected to nearby towns and cities with regular buses and other modes of transportation. Goreswar railway station is the main railway station in the area.

== See also ==
- Rangiya
- Uparhali
- Benjamin Daimary
