= Tezpur railway station =

Railway station in Assam, India

Tezpur

General information
- Location: Cotton Road, Mahabhairab, Tezpur, Sonitpur district, Assam; India
- Coordinates: 26.6178°N 92.7878°E
- Elevation: 70 metres (230 ft)
- System: Indian Railways station
- Owner: Indian Railways
- Operator: Northeast Frontier Railway
- Platforms: 1
- Tracks: 2

Construction
- Structure type: At grade

Other information
- Status: Abandoned
- Station code: TZTB
- Zone(s): Northeast Frontier
- Division(s): Rangiya
Location
- Location within Assam Location within India

Tezpur Railway Station was a railway station located in Sonitpur district of Assam. It served the Tezpur town. The station consists of one platform but the platform is not well sheltered. The station lacked many facilities including water and sanitation. The Tezpur station has been closed now, the nearest railway station is Dekargaon which is approx 4 km from the tezpur town.
