= Arunachal AC Superfast Express =

Train in India

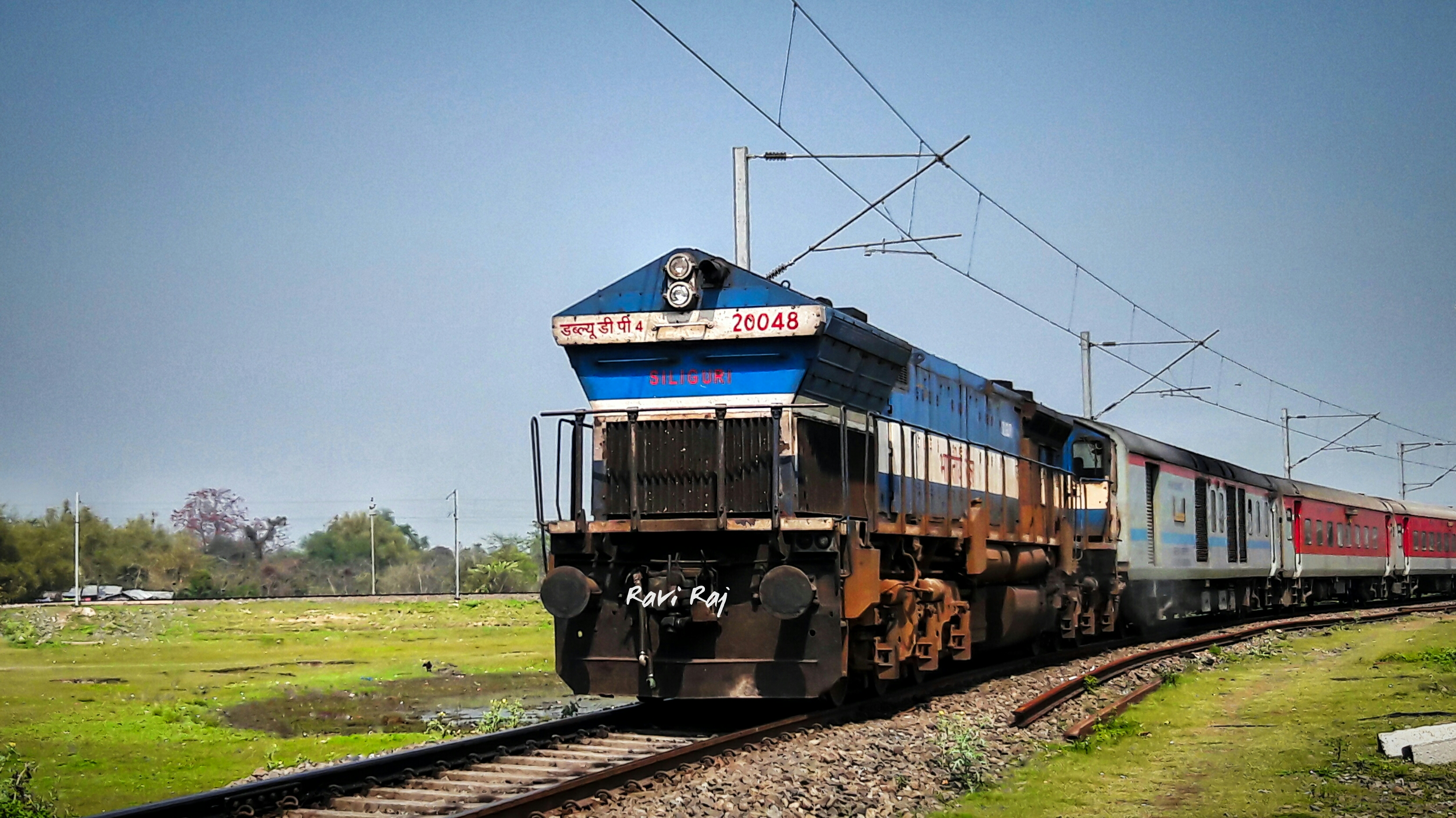

Overview
- Service type: AC Express
- Locale: Arunachal Pradesh, Assam, West Bengal, Bihar, Uttar Pradesh & Delhi
- First service: 20 February 2015; 11 years ago
- Current operator: Northern Railway

Route
- Termini: Naharlagun (NHLN); Anand Vihar Terminal (ANVT)
- Stops: 15
- Distance travelled: 2,124 km (1,320 mi)
- Average journey time: 37 hours 40 minutes
- Service frequency: Bi-weekly
- Train number: 22411 / 22412

On-board services
- Classes: AC First Class, AC 2 Tier, AC 3 Tier
- Seating arrangements: No
- Sleeping arrangements: Yes
- Catering facilities: Available
- Observation facilities: Large windows
- Baggage facilities: Available
- Other facilities: Below the seats

Technical
- Rolling stock: LHB coach
- Track gauge: 1,676 mm (5 ft 6 in)
- Operating speed: 130 km/h (81 mph) maximum, 57 km/h (35 mph) average including halts.
Route map
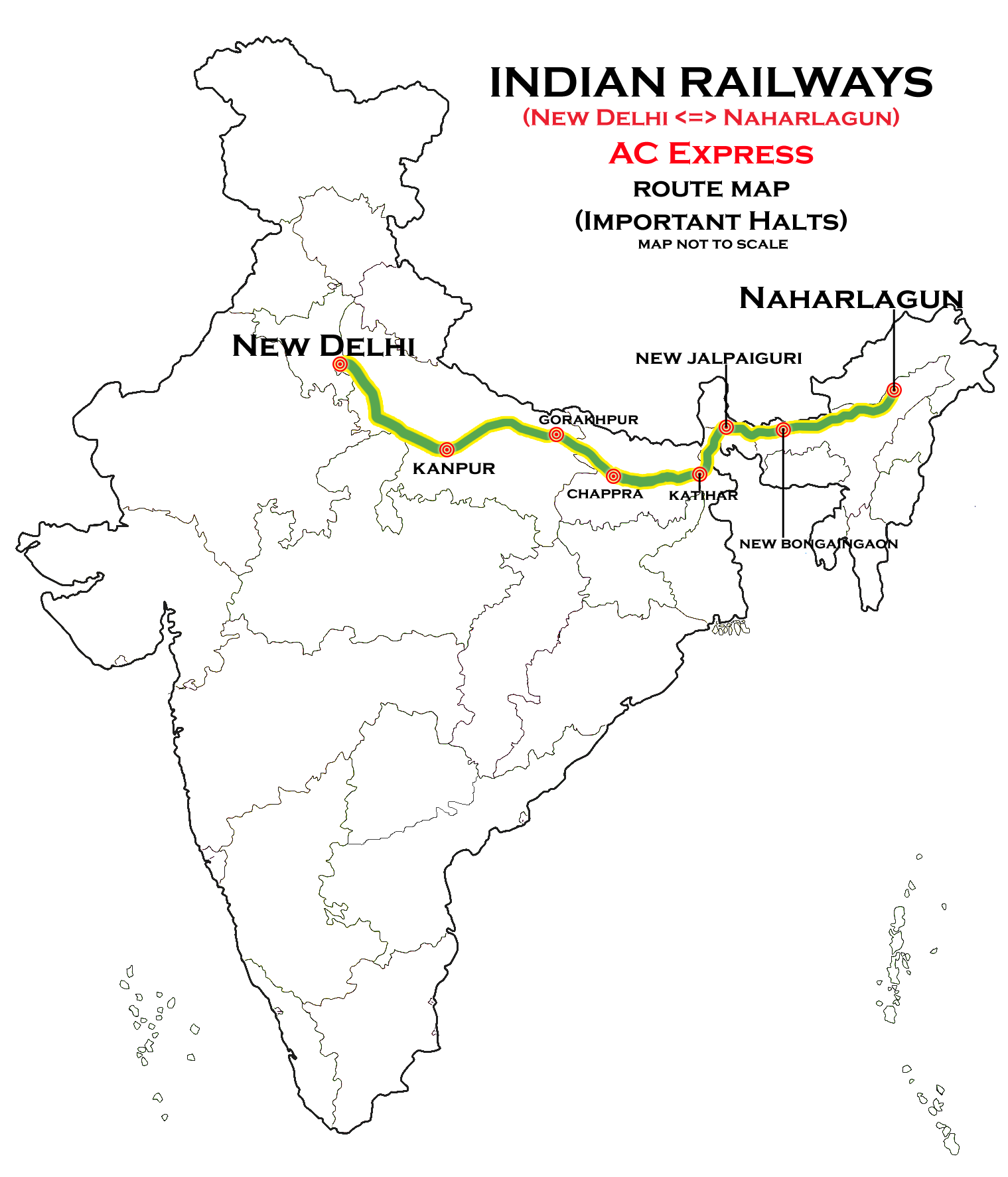

The 22411 / 22412 Arunachal AC Superfast Express is an AC Express train connecting Delhi and Naharlagun in Arunachal Pradesh.

This is the first fully air conditioned train connecting Arunachal Pradesh to Delhi and touching Assam, West Bengal, Bihar, Uttar Pradesh.

== Route & halts ==
1. Anand Vihar Terminal
2. Kanpur Central
3. Lucknow
4. Gorakhpur Junction
5. Siwan Junction
6. Chhapra Junction
7. Hajipur Junction
8. Barauni Junction
9. Katihar Junction
10. New Jalpaiguri
11. New Coochbehar
12. New Bongaigaon
13. Rangiya Junction
14. Rangapara North Junction
15. Naharlagun

== Coaches ==
The 22412/11 Delhi–Naharlagun Arunachal AC Express has 1 AC First Class, 4 AC 2 tier, 13 AC 3 tier & 2 End on Generator LHB coach. In addition, it carries a pantry car coach.

== Timetable ==
- 22411 – Leaves Naharlagun every Tuesday, Saturday at 21:35 hrs and reaches Delhi on Thursday, Monday at 11:30 AM IST
- 22412 – Leaves Delhi (Anand Vihar Terminal) every Sunday, Thursday at 16:45 hrs and reaches Naharlagun Arunachal Pradesh on Tuesday, Saturday at 6:55 AM IST

== Traction ==
Two locomotives are assigned to this train as the route is not fully electrified. Ghaziabad Loco Shed-based HOG WAP-7 / WAP-5 electric locomotive hauls the train from Anand Vihar Terminal to Rangiya and Siliguri Loco Shed- based WDP-4D diesel locomotive handles the remaining route from Rangiya to Naharlagun.
