= Dibrugarh Rajdhani Express =

Train in India

Dibrugarh–New Delhi Rajdhani Express

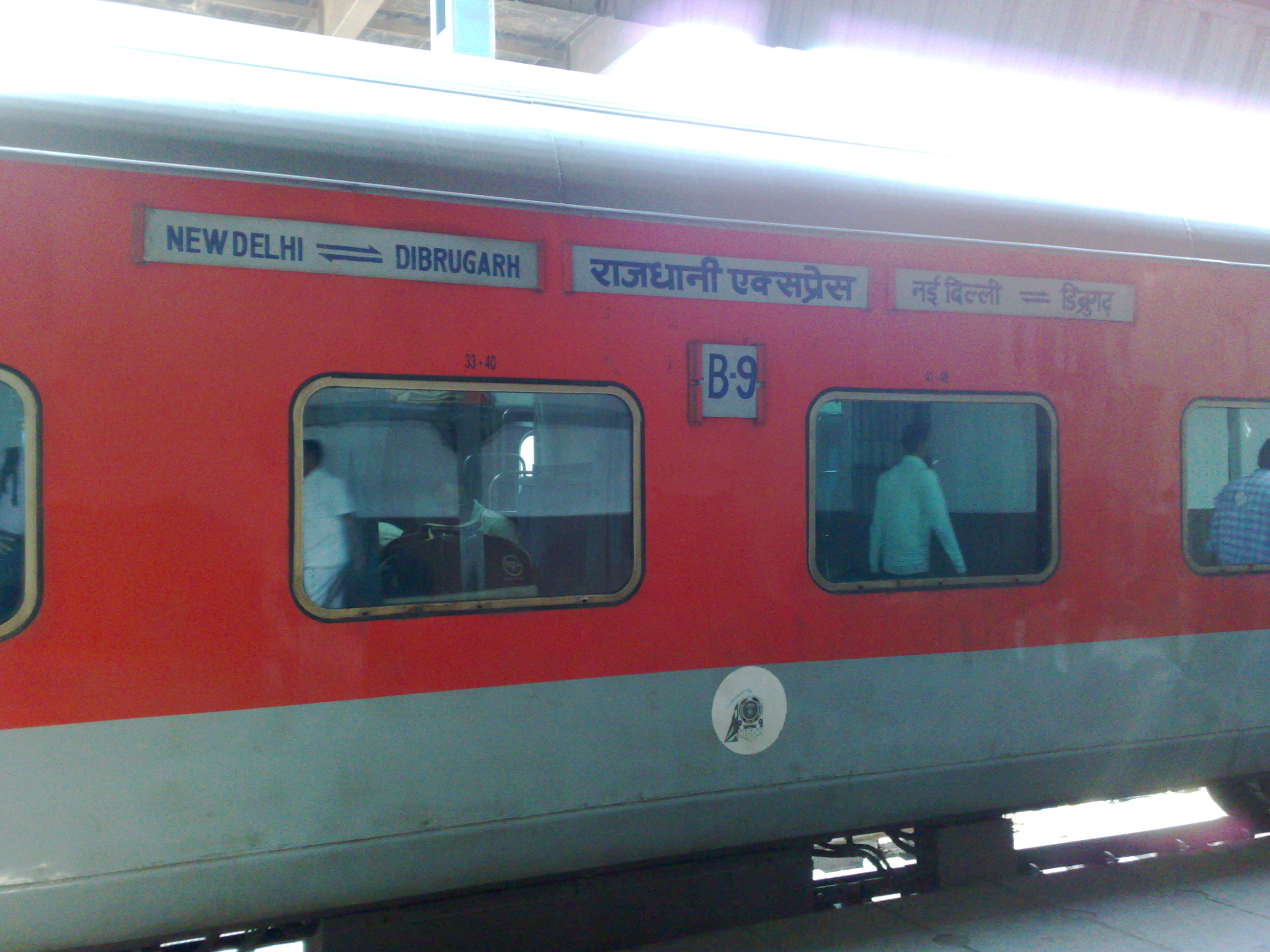
- Dibrugarh Rajdhani Express At Prayagraj Junction

Overview
- Service type: Rajdhani Express
- Locale: Assam, Nagaland, West Bengal, Bihar, Uttar Pradesh & Delhi
- Current operators: Northern Railway & Northeast Frontier Railway

Route
- Termini: Dibrugarh Town (DBRT) Dibrugarh (DBRG); New Delhi (NDLS)
- Stops: 23 as 12423 / 12424, 24 as 20503 / 20504, 26 as 20505 / 20506
- Distance travelled: 2,432 kilometres (1,511 mi) (via New Tinsukia Jn); 2,312 kilometres (1,437 mi) (via Rangapara North); 2,477 kilometres (1,539 mi) (via Moranhat)
- Average journey time: 38 hrs 55 (Approx.)
- Service frequency: Daily
- Train numbers: 12423 / 12424; 20503 / 20504; 20505 / 20506

On-board services
- Classes: AC First Class, AC 2 Tier, AC 3 Tier
- Seating arrangements: Yes
- Sleeping arrangements: Yes
- Catering facilities: Available
- Observation facilities: Large windows
- Baggage facilities: Available
- Other facilities: Below the seats

Technical
- Rolling stock: LHB coach
- Track gauge: 1,676 mm (5 ft 6 in)
- Operating speed: 12423/24 64 kmph 20503/04 59 kmph 20505/06 58 kmph
Route map
(Via New Tinsukia)
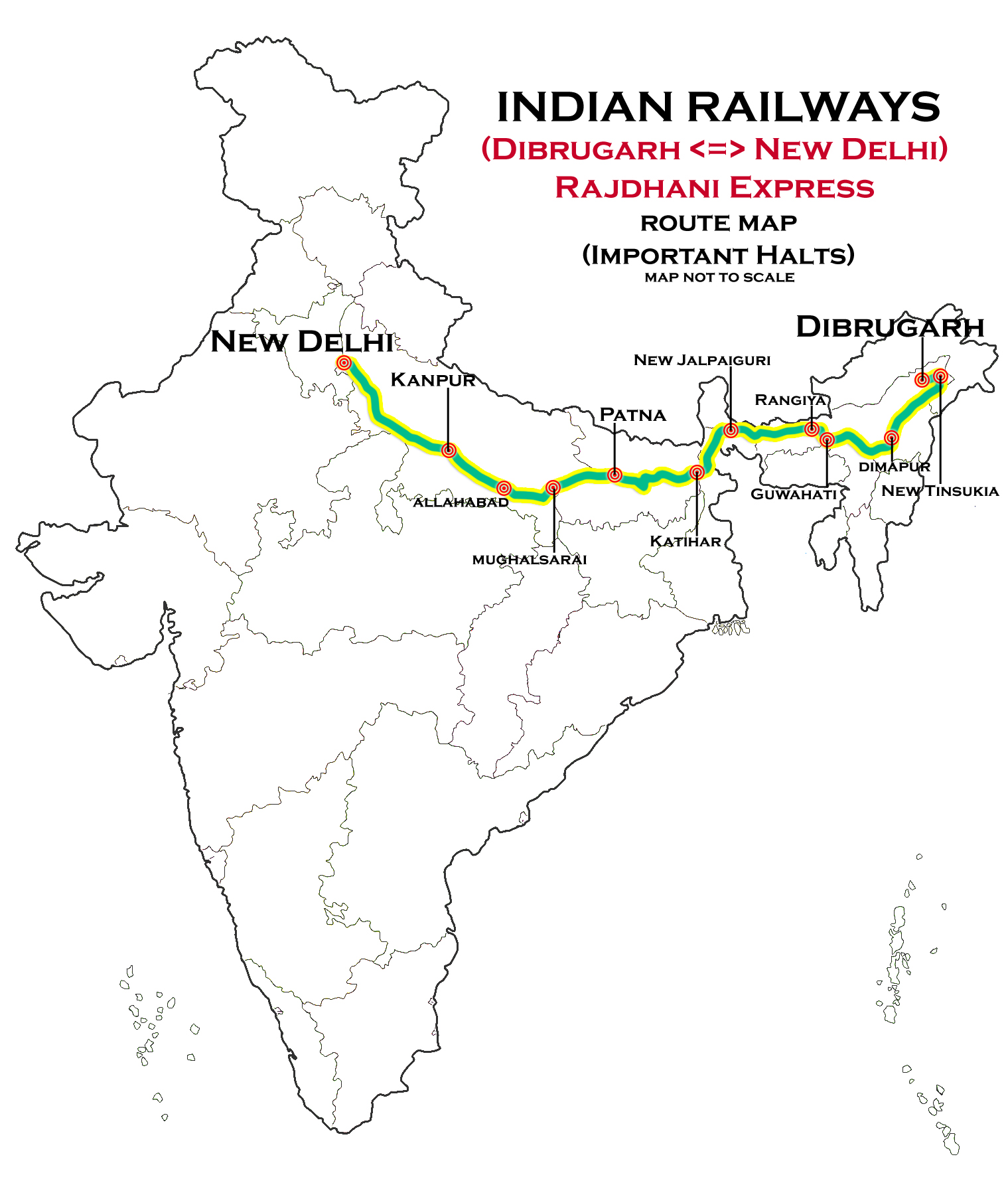
(12423 / 12424 )

The Dibrugarh–New Delhi Rajdhani Express is a group of Rajdhani-class express train services operated by Indian Railways, connecting New Delhi Railway Station (NDLS) in the National Capital Territory of Delhi with Dibrugarh Town (DBRT) and Dibrugarh (DBRG) railway station in the Indian state of Assam. The service provides one of the fastest and most prestigious rail links between the northeastern region of India and the national capital. 12423/24 via New Tinsukia Jn (NTSK), 20503/04 via Moranhat (MRHT) and 20505/06 via Rangapara North (RPAN). 12423/24 goes to Dibrugarh Town.

The train operates under three different pairs of train numbers, each running via distinct routes to improve connectivity across multiple states and to manage traffic demand along the long-distance corridor. All services are fully air-conditioned and include onboard catering as per Rajdhani Express standards.

== History ==
- The first version of this train was inaugurated on 26 October 1996 as Guwahati Rajdhani Express which ran via Barauni. It was flagged off by Ram Vilas Paswan (former Minister of Railways) which runs as a weekly service.
- This Rajdhani Express is numbered 12423/12424 & covers the distance of 2,436 kilometres (1,514 mi) in 37 hrs 45 mins running at 65 km/h (40 mph) average speed.
- Later, on 11 January 1999, the Second set of Guwahati Rajdhani Express was inaugurated which runs through Chhapra. It was flagged off by Nitish Kumar (former Minister of Railways) which runs as a bi-weekly service numbered as 2435/2436 with Dibrugarh part numbered 2435A/2436A.
- After that, on 24 March 2010, the third set of Guwahati Rajdhani Express was inaugurated which runs through Muzaffarpur. It was flagged off by Mamata Banerjee (former Minister of Railways) which runs as a weekly service numbered 2235/2236.
- The three sets of Rajdhani were permanently extended up to Dibrugarh and runs as Dibrugarh Rajdhani Express and also the frequency of First Set was increased to daily service.
- February 2021: 12235/12236 was renumbered 20503/04 Dibrugarh Rajdhani with frequency increased to 5 days a week from Weekly. 20503/20504 covers the distance of 2,462 kilometres (1,530 mi) in 39 hrs 30 mins running at 62 km/h (39 mph) average speed. 12435/12436 was renumbered 20505/06 Dibrugarh Rajdhani and runs permanently via Rangiya, Rangapara(Tezpur), Harmuti, North Lakhimpur, Bogibeel Bridge route avoiding Guwahati. 20505/20506 covers the distance of 2,282 kilometres (1,418 mi) in 39 hrs 30 mins running at 58 km/h (36 mph) average speed & is slowest Rajdhani Train of India.

== 20503 / 20504 (Via Muzaffarpur) ==
The 20503/20504 Rajdhani Express is a long-distance Rajdhani Express train of Indian Railways that runs between Dibrugarh in Assam and New Delhi, the capital of India, via Muzaffarpur. The train operates five days a week.

=== Schedule ===
20503 / 20504 Dibrugarh–New Delhi Rajdhani Express Schedule
Train Type	Rajdhani Express
Distance	2477 km
Average Speed	~85 km/h
Journey Time (DBRG → NDLS)	~41 hrs 45 min
Journey Time (NDLS → DBRG)	~41 hrs 15 min
Classes Available	1A, 2A, 3A
Catering	On-board catering included
Operating Days	5 days in a week.
Operator	Northeast Frontier Railway

=== Route ===
20503 & 20504 Dibrugarh–New Delhi Rajdhani Express
20503 DBRG → NDLS				20504 NDLS → DBRG			
Station	Arr.	Dep.	Dist (km)	Station	Arr.	Dep.	Dist (km)
Dibrugarh	—	19:55	0	New Delhi	—	11:25	0
Moranhat	20:30	20:32	42	Moradabad	14:03	14:11	167
Simaluguri Junction	21:17	21:19	96	Bareilly Junction	15:22	15:25	257
Mariani Junction	22:05	22:10	150	Lucknow Junction	18:40	18:50	492
Dimapur	00:15	00:22	258	Varanasi	22:50	23:00	793
Lumding Junction	01:40	01:45	327	Ballia	00:50	00:55	934
Guwahati	05:15	05:30	508	Chhapra Junction	02:07	02:12	999
New Bongaigaon	08:00	08:10	665	Hajipur Junction	03:17	03:22	1058
Kokrajhar	08:43	08:45	696	Muzaffarpur Junction	04:00	04:10	1112
New Alipurduar	09:30	09:32	774	Samastipur Junction	05:05	05:10	1163
New Cooch Behar	09:55	09:57	793	Katihar Junction	08:35	08:45	1373
New Jalpaiguri Junction	12:05	12:15	919	Kishanganj	09:58	10:00	1471
Kishanganj	13:20	13:22	1006	New Jalpaiguri Junction	11:25	11:35	1558
Katihar Junction	15:10	15:20	1104	New Cooch Behar	13:35	13:37	1684
Samastipur Junction	18:35	18:40	1314	New Alipurduar	13:58	14:00	1703
Muzaffarpur Junction	19:30	19:40	1365	Kokrajhar	14:48	14:50	1781
Hajipur Junction	20:30	20:35	1419	New Bongaigaon	15:25	15:35	1812
Chhapra Junction	21:55	22:00	1478	Guwahati	18:20	18:35	1969
Ballia	22:55	23:00	1543	Lumding Junction	21:20	21:25	2150
Varanasi	01:30	01:40	1684	Dimapur	22:38	22:45	2219
Lucknow Junction	05:45	05:55	1985	Mariani Junction	01:40	01:45	2327
Bareilly Junction	09:10	09:15	2220	Simaluguri Junction	02:33	02:35	2381
Moradabad	10:45	10:55	2311	Moranhat	03:20	03:22	2435
New Delhi	13:38	—	2477	Dibrugarh	04:40	—	2477

=== Coach composition ===
Category	Coaches	Total
Luggage/Parcel Rake (LPR)	LPR1, LPR2	2
AC 2 Tier (2A)	A1, A2, A3, A4	4
AC First Class (1A)	H1	1
Pantry Car (PC)	PC	1
AC 3 Tier (3A)	B1, B2, B3, B4, B5, B6, B7, B8, B9, B10, B11, B12, B13	13
Power Car (VP)	VP1, VP2	2
Total Coaches		23

- Primary Maintenance – Dibrugrah CD
- Secondary Maintenance - NDLS CD

== 20505 / 20506 (Via Rangapara North - Barauni - Hajipur) ==
20505/20506 Dibrugarh–New Delhi Rajdhani Express (Via Rangapara North) is a premium long-distance Rajdhani Express train operated by Indian Railways, connecting Dibrugarh in Assam with New Delhi, the capital of India. This train runs 2 days a week via Rangapara North, Guwahati, and key junctions in eastern and northern India, providing fast, fully air-conditioned service with classes including AC First Class, AC 2-Tier, and AC 3-Tier

=== Schedule ===
20505 / 20506 Dibrugarh–New Delhi Rajdhani Express Schedule
Train Type	Rajdhani Express
Distance	2312 km
Average Speed	~82 km/h
Journey Time (DBRG → NDLS)	~39 hrs 40 min
Journey Time (NDLS → DBRG)	~39 hrs 45 min
Classes Available	1A, 2A, 3A
Catering	On-board catering included
Operating Days	Bi-Weekly
Operator	Northeast Frontier Railway

=== Route ===
20505 & 20506 Dibrugarh–New Delhi Rajdhani Express
20505 DBRG → NDLS				20506 NDLS → DBRG			
Station	Arr.	Dep.	Dist (km)	Station	Arr.	Dep.	Dist (km)
Dibrugarh	—	22:00	0	New Delhi	—	11:25	0
North Lakhimpur	00:08	00:13	131	Moradabad	14:03	14:11	167
Harmuti	00:48	00:53	161	Bareilly	15:22	15:25	257
Rangapara North	02:50	03:00	315	Lucknow Junction	18:40	18:50	492
New Misamari	03:14	03:16	325	Varanasi	22:50	23:00	793
Udalguri	03:40	03:42	377	Ballia	00:50	00:55	934
Tangla	04:10	04:12	399	Chhapra Junction	02:07	02:12	999
Rangiya Junction	05:40	05:50	438	Hajipur Junction	03:17	03:22	1058
New Bongaigaon	08:00	08:10	547	Barauni Junction	04:45	04:55	1146
Kokrajhar	08:43	08:45	578	Begusarai	05:16	05:18	1161
New Alipurduar	09:30	09:32	657	Katihar Junction	08:35	08:45	1325
New Cooch Behar	09:55	10:00	675	Kishanganj	09:58	10:00	1423
New Jalpaiguri Junction	12:05	12:15	801	New Jalpaiguri Junction	11:25	11:35	1511
Kishanganj	13:20	13:22	889	New Cooch Behar	13:35	13:40	1637
Katihar Junction	15:10	15:20	987	New Alipurduar	13:58	14:00	1655
Begusarai	17:48	17:50	1151	Kokrajhar	14:48	14:50	1734
Barauni Junction	18:25	18:35	1166	New Bongaigaon	15:25	15:35	1765
Hajipur Junction	20:30	20:35	1254	Rangiya Junction	17:20	17:30	1874
Chhapra Junction	21:55	22:00	1313	Tangla	18:00	18:02	1913
Ballia	22:55	23:00	1378	Udalguri	18:18	18:20	1935
Varanasi	01:30	01:40	1519	New Misamari	19:05	19:07	1986
Lucknow Junction	05:45	05:55	1820	Rangapara North	19:30	19:40	1997
Bareilly	09:10	09:15	2055	Harmuti	22:00	22:05	2150
Moradabad	10:45	10:55	2145	North Lakhimpur	00:05	00:10	2180
New Delhi	13:38	—	2312	Dibrugarh	03:10	—	2312

=== Coach composition ===
Category	Coaches	Total
Luggage/Parcel Rake (LPR)	LPR1, LPR2	2
AC 3 Tier (3A)	B1, B2, B3, B4, B5, B6, B7, B8, B9, B10, B11, B12, B13	13
Pantry Car (PC)	PC	1
AC First Class (1A)	H1	1
AC 2 Tier (2A)	A1, A2, A3, A4	4
Total Coaches		21

- Primary Maintenance – Dibrugrah CD
- Secondary Maintenance - NDLS CD

== 12423 / 12424 (Via New Tinsukia - Barauni - Hajipur - Patliputra) ==
Dibrugarh–New Delhi Rajdhani Express (12423/12424) is a premium long-distance Rajdhani Express train operated by Indian Railways, connecting Dibrugarh in Assam with New Delhi, the capital of India. It runs Daily via Guwahati, Patliputra and other key junctions in eastern and northern India, providing fast, fully air-conditioned service with classes including AC First Class, AC 2-Tier, and AC 3-Tie

== Schedule ==
12423 / 12424 Dibrugarh–New Delhi Rajdhani Express Schedule
Train Type	Rajdhani Express
Distance	2432 km
Average Speed	~83 km/h
Journey Time (DBRG → NDLS)	~37 hrs 40 min
Journey Time (NDLS → DBRG)	~37 hrs 45 min
Classes Available	1A, 2A, 3A
Catering	On-board catering included
Operating Days	Daily
Operator	Northeast Frontier Railway

=== Route ===
12423 & 12424 Dibrugarh–New Delhi Rajdhani Express
12423 DBRG → NDLS				12424 NDLS → DBRG			
Station	Arr.	Dep.	Dist (km)	Station	Arr.	Dep.	Dist (km)
Dibrugarh	—	20:50	0	New Delhi	—	16:20	0
New Tinsukia	21:35	21:45	42	Kanpur Central	21:00	21:05	441
Mariani Junction	23:53	23:58	198	Subedarganj	22:58	23:00	631
Dimapur	02:00	02:07	306	Pt. Deen Dayal Upadhyaya Junction	01:13	01:20	788
Diphu	02:42	02:44	344	Danapur	03:38	03:40	986
Lumding Junction	03:15	03:20	375	Patliputra	04:00	04:10	992
Chaparmukh Junction	04:36	04:38	465	Barauni Junction	06:35	06:45	1100
Guwahati	06:20	06:35	556	Mansi Junction	07:38	07:40	1165
Rangiya Junction	07:28	07:30	604	Naugachia	08:24	08:26	1223
New Bongaigaon	09:00	09:10	713	Katihar Junction	09:35	09:45	1280
Kokrajhar	09:50	09:52	744	Kishanganj	11:00	11:02	1378
New Cooch Behar	10:58	11:00	841	New Jalpaiguri Junction	12:30	12:40	1465
New Jalpaiguri Junction	13:05	13:15	967	New Cooch Behar	14:15	14:17	1591
Kishanganj	14:20	14:22	1054	Kokrajhar	15:15	15:17	1688
Katihar Junction	16:20	16:30	1152	New Bongaigaon	16:15	16:25	1719
Naugachia	17:08	17:10	1209	Rangiya Junction	17:40	17:42	1829
Mansi Junction	18:03	18:05	1267	Guwahati	19:10	19:25	1876
Barauni Junction	19:05	19:15	1332	Chaparmukh Junction	20:43	20:45	1967
Patliputra	21:30	21:40	1440	Lumding Junction	22:15	22:20	2057
Danapur	21:56	21:58	1446	Diphu	22:50	22:52	2089
Pt. Deen Dayal Upadhyaya Junction	00:53	01:00	1644	Dimapur	23:30	23:37	2126
Subedarganj	02:58	03:00	1801	Mariani Junction	02:10	02:15	2234
Kanpur Central	04:55	05:00	1991	New Tinsukia	04:20	04:30	2390
New Delhi	10:30	—	2432	Dibrugarh	06:05	—	2432

=== Coach Composition ===
Category	Coaches	Total
Luggage/Parcel Rake (LPR)	LPR1, LPR2	2
AC 2 Tier (2A)	A1, A2, A3, A4	4
AC First Class (1A)	H1	1
Pantry Car (PC)	PC	1
AC 3 Tier (3A)	B1, B2, B3, B4, B5, B6, B7, B8, B9, B10, B11, B12, B13	13
Power Car (VP)	VP1, VP2	2
Total Coaches		23

- Primary Maintenance – Dibrugrah CD
- Secondary Maintenance - NDLS CD

== Traction ==
Train is hauled by the WAP-7 of Ghaziabad and Tuglakabad shed. For 20506 Dibrugarh Rajdhani the loco is changed at Rngiya From WAP-7 to WDP4 or WDP4-B or WDP4-D of Siliguri shed or to the WDP-4D of New Guwahati shed.

For 20505 Dibrugarh Rajdhani, earlier was WDP-4D, the train is hauled by WAP-7 of Ghaziabad or Tuglakabad shed from New Delhi to Rangiya Junction.

For the 12424 Dibrugarh Rajdhani, earlier was WDP-4B, the train is hauled by a WAP-7 electric locomotive of Ghaziabad Loco Shed from New Delhi to Guwahati.
