= Bhalukpong railway station =

Railway station in Arunachal Pradesh

Bhalukpong

General information
- Location: West Kameng district, Arunachal Pradesh; India
- Coordinates: 27.0006°N 92.6447°E
- Elevation: 162 metres (531 ft)
- System: Indian Railways station
- Owner: Indian Railways
- Operator: Northeast Frontier
- Platforms: 3
- Tracks: 4 (Single diesel line 5 ft 6 in (1,676 mm) broad gauge)
- Connections: Auto stand

Construction
- Structure type: Standard (on-ground station)
- Parking: Yes
- Cycle facilities: Yes

Other information
- Status: Functioning
- Station code: BHNG
- Zone(s): Northeast Frontier
- Division(s): Rangiya
Location
- Location within Arunachal Pradesh

Bhalukpong Railway Station is a small railway station in West Kameng district, Arunachal Pradesh. Its code is BHNG. It serves Bhalukpong town. The station consists of 3 platform. A new station building and platform with good shelters have been built on newly converted broad-gauge line. And facilities including water and sanitation have been provided.

== Major trains ==
- Dekargaon–Bhalukpong Passenger
- Rangiya–Bhalukpong Passenger
