= Udalguri railway station =

Railway station in Assam

Udalguri Railway Station

General information
- Location: Odalguri, Udalguri district, Assam; India
- Coordinates: 26.744291°N 92.094329°E
- Elevation: 111 metres (364 ft)
- System: Indian Railways station
- Owner: Indian Railways
- Operator: Northeast Frontier Railway
- Line: Rangiya–Murkongselek section
- Platforms: 3
- Tracks: 1

Construction
- Structure type: At grade
- Parking: No
- Cycle facilities: No

Other information
- Status: Single diesel line
- Station code: ULG
- Zone(s): Northeast Frontier
- Division(s): Rangiya

History
- Rebuilt: 2015

Services
Preceding station	Indian Railways	Following station
Harisinga towards ?	Northeast Frontier Railway zone Rangiya–Murkongselek section	Rowta Bagan towards ?
Location
- Location within Assam Location within India

Udalguri railway station is a railway station on Rangiya–Murkongselek section under Rangiya railway division of Northeast Frontier Railway zone. This railway station is situated at Odalguri town in Udalguri district in the Indian state of Assam.
