= Harisinga =

- town
- Location in Assam, India Harisinga (India)
- Coordinates: 26.43308°N 91.5910°E
- Country: India
- State: Assam
- District: Udalguri-BTAD-Bodoland Territorial Autonomous District
- Elevation: 180 m (590 ft)

Languages
  - Official: Assamese, Bodo
- Time zone: UTC+5:30 (IST)
- PIN: 784510
- Telephone code: 03711 XXXXXX
- Vehicle registration: AS-27

Harisinga is a town in the Udalguri district in the northeastern Indian state of Assam. It is in the Bhergaon subdivision of Udalguri district.

== Politics ==
Harisinga is part of Mangaldoi (Lok Sabha constituency).
