= Murkongselek railway station =

Railway station in Assam, India

Murkongselek

General information
- Other names: মূৰ্কংচেলেক
- Location: Murkongselek, Jonai, Dhemaji district, Assam; India
- Coordinates: 27.8291°N 95.2192°E
- Elevation: 132 metres (433 ft)
- System
- Owner: Indian Railways
- Operator: Northeast Frontier Railway
- Line: Rangiya–Murkongselek section
- Platforms: 3
- Tracks: 5
- Connections: Auto stand, Rikshaw,

Construction
- Structure type: At grade
- Parking: Available
- Cycle facilities: Available

Other information
- Status: Single diesel line
- Station code: MZS
- Zone(s): Northeast Frontier
- Division(s): Rangiya

History
- Rebuilt: 2015
- Electrified: Ongoing

Passengers
- 5K/Day

Services
Location
- Location within Assam Location within India

Murkongselek Railway Station is a main railway station in Dhemaji district, Assam. Its code is MZS. It serves Murkongselek town. The station consists of three platforms. The station has been upgraded to a standard Class II Station. . It is a railway station which connects Assam to Arunachal Pradesh.

== Station details ==
=== Platforms ===
There are a total of 3 platforms and 5 tracks. The platforms are connected by foot overbridge. These platforms are built to accommodate 24 coaches express train.

Murkongselek railway station has a separate platform for receiving and unloading freight (goods) trains.

=== Station layout ===
G	Street level	Exit/Entrance & ticket counter
P1	FOB, Side platform, No-1 doors will open on the left/right
P1	Track 1
P1	Track 2
P1	FOB, Island platform, No- 2 doors will open on the left/right
P1	Island platform, No- 3 doors will open on the left/right
P1	Track 3
Track 4	For freight trains
Track 5	For freight trains

== Major Trains ==
- Kamakhya–Murkongselek Lachit Express
- Rangapara North–Murkongselek Express
- Dekargaon–Murkongselek Express

== Underconstruction new rail lines ==
The 227 km long Murkongselek–Pasighat–Tezu–Rupai line is being undertaken as a strategic project.

== Nearest airport ==
The nearest airports are Dibrugarh Airport, Lilabari Airport in Lakhimpur district, and Pasighat Airport in Arunachal Pradesh (roughly 37 km away).

== See also ==
- Murkongselek
- Indian Railways
- Rangiya Junction railway station
- Rangiya–Murkongselek section
- Northeast Frontier Railway zone
- List of railway stations in India
