= Naharlagun–Guwahati Shatabdi Express =

Shatabdi Express train in India

Naharlagun - Guwahati Shatabdi Express

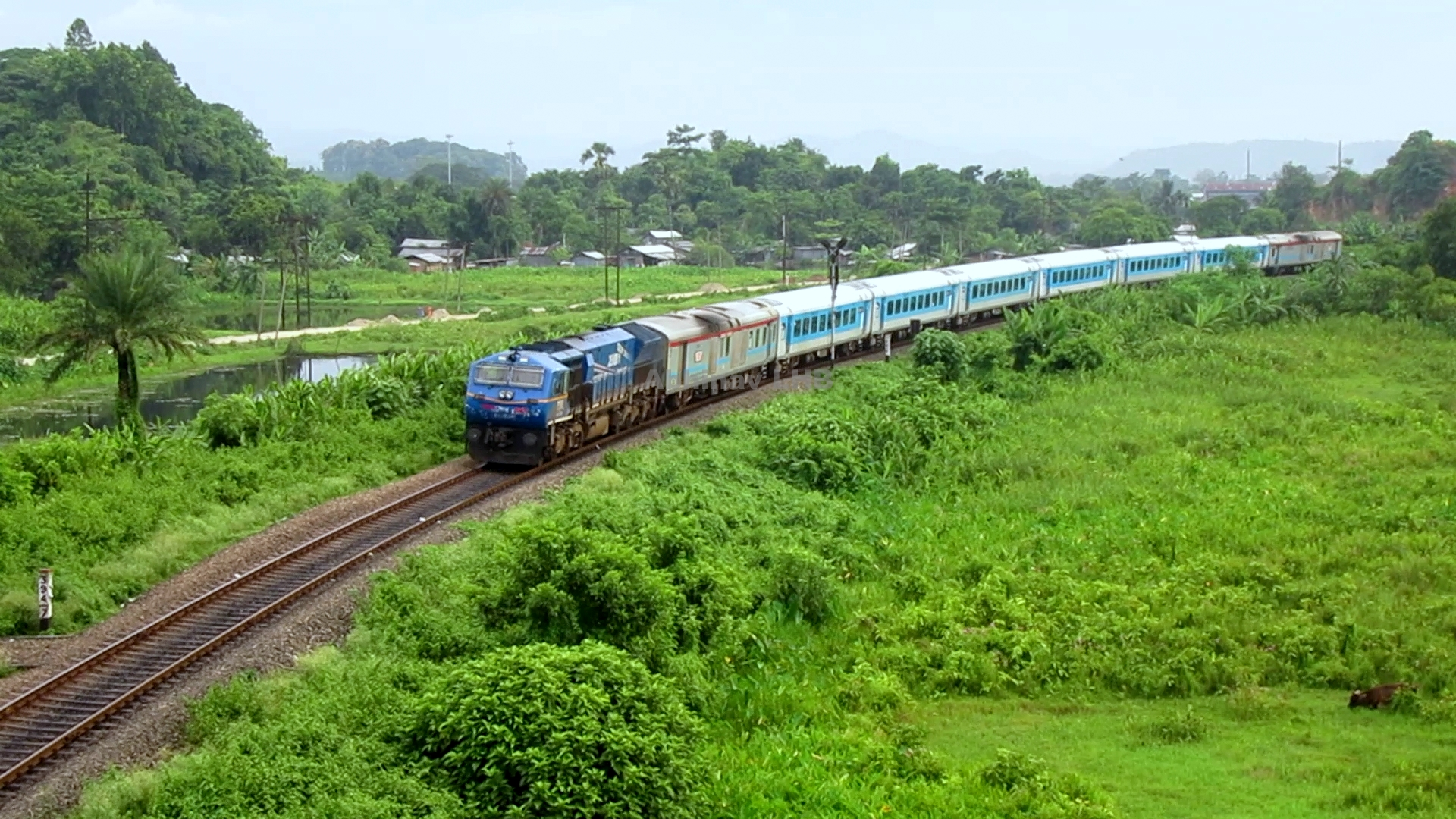
- Guwahati–Naharlagun Shatabdi Express with imported EMD WDP-4

Overview
- Service type: Shatabdi Express
- Locale: Arunachal Pradesh, Assam
- First service: 9 May 2017; 9 years ago
- Current operator: Northeast Frontier Railway

Route
- Termini: Naharlagun (NHLN); Guwahati (GHY)
- Stops: 7
- Distance travelled: 332 km (206 mi)
- Average journey time: 06 hours
- Service frequency: Weekly
- Train number: 12087 / 12088

On-board services
- Classes: AC Chair Car and Vistadome
- Seating arrangements: Yes
- Sleeping arrangements: No
- Catering facilities: Yes
- Observation facilities: Large windows
- Entertainment facilities: No
- Baggage facilities: Overhead racks

Technical
- Rolling stock: LHB coach
- Track gauge: 1,676 mm (5 ft 6 in)
- Operating speed: 75 km/h (47 mph), including halts
Route map
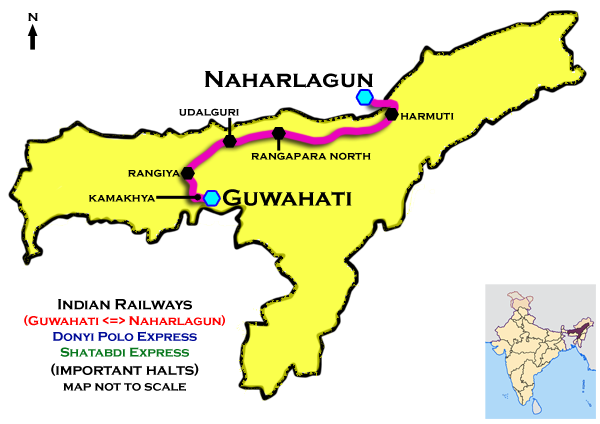

Naharlagun–Guwahati Shatabdi Express is a Shatabdi Express category type of service belonging to Northeast Frontier Railway zone that runs between Naharlagun and Guwahati in India.

It operates as train number 12087 from Naharlagun to Guwahati and as train number 12088 in the reverse direction, serving the states of Assam and Arunachal Pradesh.

== Coaches ==
The 12085/ 86 Naharlagun–Guwahati Shatabdi Express presently has 6 AC Chair Car and 2 End-on Generator coaches. It does not carry a pantry car but being a Shatabdi-category train, catering is arranged on board the train. It is now hailed by an NGC WAP-7

As is customary with most train services in India, coach composition may be amended at the discretion of Indian Railways depending on demand.

Loco	1	2	3	4	5	6	7	8
	EOG	C7	C6	C5	C4	C3	C2	EOG

== Service ==
The 12087 / 12088 Naharlagun–Guwahati Shatabdi Express covers the distance of 332 kilometres in 06 hours 00 mins in both directions.

The average speed of the train is 55 km/h.

== Routing ==
The 12087 / 88 Naharlagun–Guwahati Shatabdi Express runs from Naharlagun via Viswanath Charali, Rangiya Junction to Guwahati.

Being a Shatabdi-class train, it returns to its originating station Naharlagun on next day and also it shares rakes with 12085/86 Guwahati–Dibrugarh Shatabdi Express
