= Bogibeel Bridge =

River bridge in Assam, India

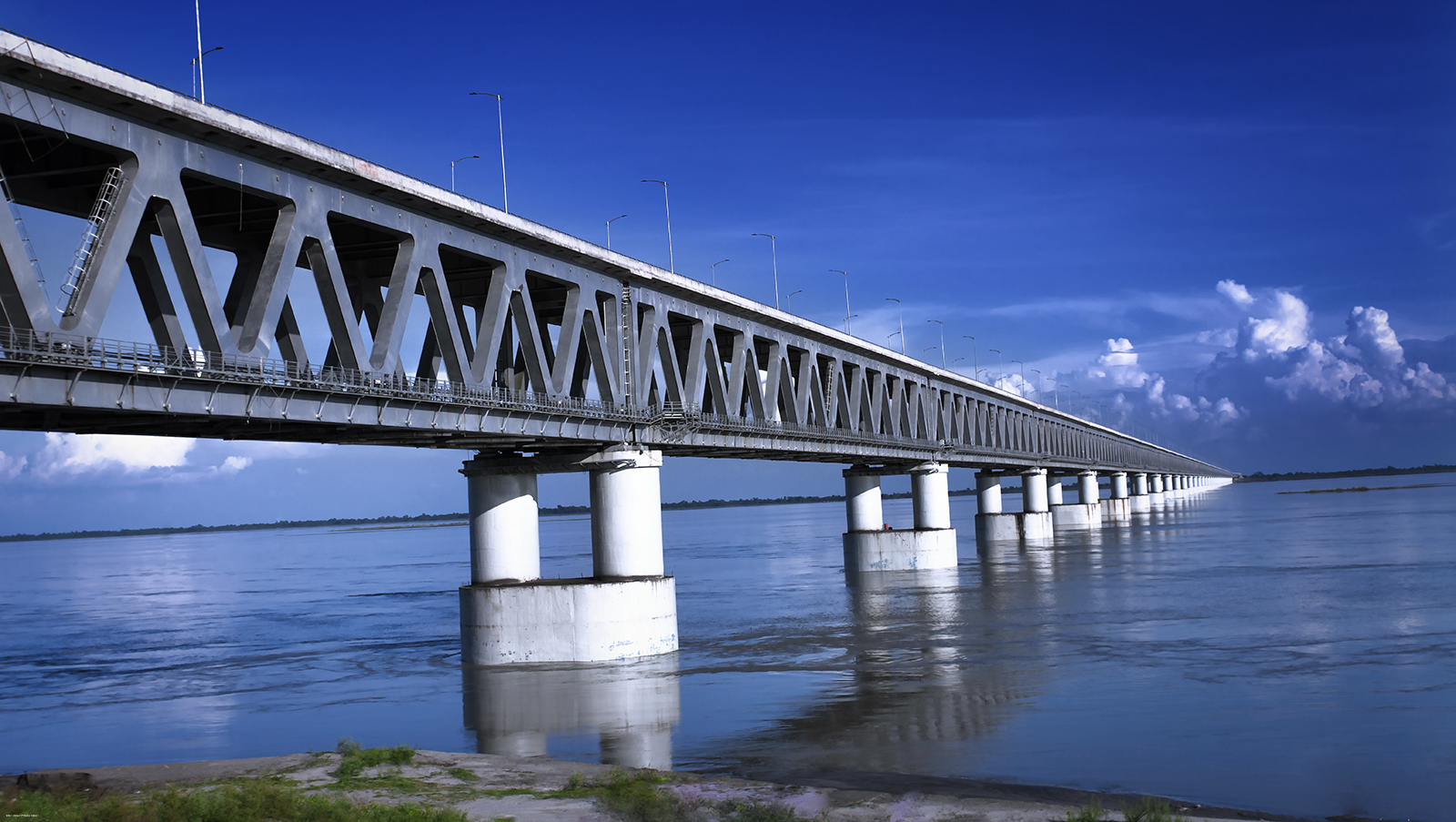
- Coordinates: 27°24′31″N 94°45′37″E
- Carries: NH 15
- Crosses: Brahmaputra River
- Locale: Assam, India

Characteristics
- Design: Truss bridge
- Material: Steel, Concrete
- Total length: 4.94 kilometres (3.07 mi)
- Longest span: 125 m (410 ft)
- No. of spans: 41

History
- Designer: RITES
- Constructed by: Hindustan Construction Company (HCC) and Gammon India
- Construction start: 21 April 2002
- Opened: 25 December 2018

Location
- Interactive map of Bogibeel Bridge

The Bogibeel Bridge is an operational, 4.94 km long, combined road-cum-rail bridge over the Brahmaputra River in the northeastern Indian state of Assam between Dhemaji city in Dhemaji district on north bank and Dibrugarh city in Dibrugarh district on south bank, with double broad-gauge rail line at lower deck and 3-lane road highway on the upper deck. It is the longest rail-cum-road bridge in India and Asia's second longest rail-cum-road bridge. The bridge is of strategic importance to India as it significantly eases India's ability to transport troops and supplies to the border with Tibet in Arunachal Pradesh. The bridge is located just over 20 km south of the Assam-Arunachal Pradesh border and acts as an alternative to the Kolia Bhomora Setu 270 km west at Tezpur in providing connectivity to nearly five million people residing in Upper Assam and Arunachal Pradesh.

== History ==
=== 1985-2002: Conception ===
The bridge traces its origins to the Assam Accord of 1985 and was one of several major infrastructural projects to be set up in Assam in accordance with the pact. It was sanctioned by the Government of India in 1997-98 and was expected to be completed by the end of the Ninth Five Year Plan. The foundation of the bridge was laid in January 1997 by Prime Minister H. D. Deve Gowda, but its construction was inaugurated only in 2002 by Prime Minister, A. B. Vajpayee. Thereafter, North East Frontier Railway awarded the Design and Consultancy contract to RITES. Scientific Model Studies were done by UPIRI Roorkee. A Global Expression of Interest was invited, DSD Steel of Germany was shortlisted for construction of Superstructure Work. By 2004 the preliminary design and shortlisting of agencies was completed.

=== 202-11: Delays and cost overruns ===
Construction commenced in 2002 and took a total of 200 months (16 years and 8 months) to complete. The project was to be completed in six years following the inauguration, however the work did not begin even in 2007, owing to lack of funds and attention. Consequently, that same year, the Bogibeel Bridge was granted a national project status by the Government of India in 2007 by Prime Minister Manmohan Singh, but the implementation was slow, notwithstanding a Congress government in Assam. In April 2008, the Northeast Frontier Railway contracted Gammon India to construct the sub-structure of the bridge while a consortium of Hindustan Construction Company, DSD Brückenbau GmbH, Germany and VNR Infrastructures won the bid to build the superstructure. Accordingly, the Union Ministry of Finance funded 75% of the project costs while the Ministry of Railways financed the rest.

=== 2011: Construction re-commenced ===
The actual work on the project recommenced only in 2011. The bridge was constructed by a consortium of construction companies headed by Hindustan Construction Company. The bridge's construction was subject to large time and cost overruns over time. The cost, initially estimated at ₹1,767 crore (US$180 million), escalated to ₹4,996 crore (US$520 million) by 2014.

=== 2018: Completed ===
On 2 December 2018, the bridge opened as the first freight train crossed it. On 25 December, the Indian Prime Minister Narendra Modi inaugurated the Bogibeel bridge, on the birth anniversary of former Prime Minister Atal Bihari Vajpayee on the occasion of Good Governance Day, and also flag off an intercity express connecting Tinsukia and Naharlagun. The overall cost of the project ultimately escalated to ₹5,960 crore (US$620 million) as the total length of the bridge increased from 4.31 kilometres (2.68 mi) to 4.94 kilometres (3.07 mi).

== Details ==
=== Features ===
The bridge, with has a serviceable period of 120 years, is the 6th longest bridge in India after the Mumbai Trans Harbour Link, Bhupen Hazarika Setu, Dibang River Bridge, Mahatma Gandhi Setu and Bandra–Worli Sea Link. As it is situated in an earthquake-prone area it is India's first bridge to have fully welded steel-concrete support beams that can withstand earthquakes of magnitudes up to 7 on the Richter scale. Owing to its strategic importance, it was also built with supporting the movement of tanks and aircraft in mind. The design of the bridge has 41 spans of 125 m and a superstructure of composite welded steel truss and reinforced concrete.

=== Road connectivity ===
The bridge connects Dhemaji district and Dibrugarh district in Assam through National Highway 15.

=== Rail connectivity ===
The Bogibeel Bridge provides a connection between the Rangiya–Murkongselek section of the Northeast Frontier Railway, located on the northern bank of the Brahmaputra River, and the Lumding–Dibrugarh section that lies to the southern bank. New Dibrugarh Railway Station, is linked to the Rangiya–Murkongselek line via Chaulkhowa and Moranhat, Railways has connected Dhamalgaon-Tangani rail line north of bridge to 44 km Chalkhowa–Moranhat line to the south.

== See also ==
- List of bridges on Brahmaputra River
- North Eastern Railway Connectivity Project
