= Murkongselek =

Murkongselek is a village in Assam. It is located in the north-eastern part of Dhemaji district, 42 km from Pasighat, East Siang district, Arunachal Pradesh. Tourist attractions are located nearby in Torajan dolung Jonai and Silapathar. The village also has a railway station. It is around 540 km from Guwahati. The nearest airport is Pasighat Airport.

== See also ==
- Murkongselek railway station
