= Dibrugarh–Deogarh Express =

Dibrugarh - Deogarh Express
Overview
- Service type: Express
- First service: 5 March 2024; 2 years ago
- Current operator: Northeast Frontier Railway

Route
- Termini: Deoghar Junction (DGHR); Dibrugarh (DBRG)
- Stops: 28
- Distance travelled: 1,294 km (804 mi)
- Average journey time: 30 hours 30 Minutes
- Service frequency: Weekly
- Train number: 15926/15927

On-board services
- Classes: AC 2 Tier, AC 3 Tier, Sleeper 3 Tier, Unreserved
- Seating arrangements: Yes
- Sleeping arrangements: Yes
- Catering facilities: Yes
- Observation facilities: LHB coach
- Entertainment facilities: No
- Baggage facilities: Available

Technical
- Rolling stock: 2
- Track gauge: 1,676 mm (5 ft 6 in)
- Operating speed: 42 km/h (26 mph)

Dibrugarh - Deogarh Express is an Express train of the Indian Railways connecting Deoghar Junction in Jharkhand and Dibrugarh in Assam. It is currently being operated with 15926/15927 train numbers once in week basis. The train passes through Jharkhand, Bihar, West Bengal and Assam.
