= Rangiya Junction railway station =

Railway station in Assam, India

RANGIYA Jn.

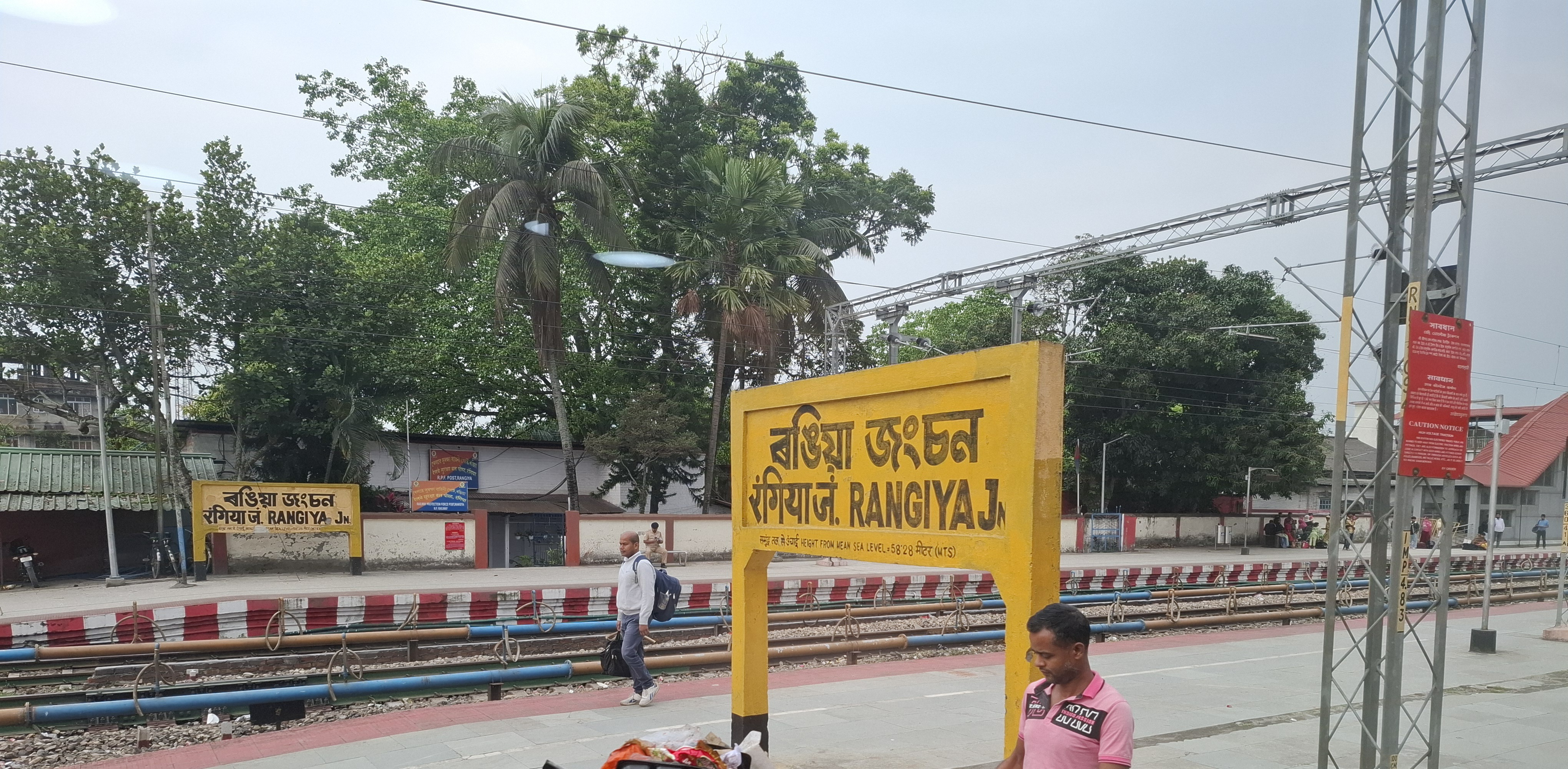
- Rangiya Junction Station

General information
- Location: Station Road, Rangiya-781354, Assam; India
- Coordinates: 26°26′50″N 91°36′20″E
- Elevation: 53 metres (174 ft)
- System: Indian Railways junction station
- Owner: Indian Railways
- Operator: Northeast Frontier Railway
- Lines: New Bongaigaon–Guwahati section; Rangiya–Murkongselek section
- Platforms: 5
- Tracks: 9
- Connections: Bus, Auto-rickshaw, E-rickshaw

Construction
- Structure type: Standard on ground
- Parking: Available
- Cycle facilities: Available
- Accessible: Yes

Other information
- Status: Functioning
- Station code: RNY
- Zone(s): Northeast Frontier Railway
- Division(s): Rangiya

History
- Opened: 1909; 117 years ago
- Electrified: Yes (2021)
- Former names: Assam Bengal Railway

Passengers
- 40K/Day (▲ high)

Services
Location
- Location within Assam

Rangiya Junction railway station is a junction station on the New Bongaigaon–Guwahati section of Barauni–Guwahati line, and Rangia–Tezpur line of Rangiya–Murkongselek section. It is located in Kamrup district in the Indian state of Assam. It serves Rangiya and the surrounding areas. . Rangiya Junction is the 4th largest railway station in Northeast India.

== History ==
In 1883–84 the 1,000 mm (3 ft 3 3/8 in)-wide metre-gauge line of Assam Behar State Railway met the Eastern Bengal Railway's 5 ft 6 in (1,676 mm) broad gauge line at Parbatipur Junction. It reached Katihar Junction in 1888–89 and in 1909 it reached Amingaon on the banks of the Brahmaputra, which could be crossed by ferry to reach Guwahati.

The new broad-gauge track from New Bongaigaon to Guwahati was commissioned in 1984.

Saraighat Bridge opened in 1962, initially carried metre-gauge tracks, which was later replaced by broad-gauge tracks.

The 450 km (280 mi)-long Rangia–Murkongselek line is being converted from 1,000 mm (3 ft 3 3/8 in)-wide metre gauge to 5 ft 6 in (1,676 mm) broad gauge. As of 2013, the work is expected to be completed soon.

== Infrastructure and amenities ==
Indian Railways, has carried out several development works to improve the condition of the platforms and station. An amount of Rs10-15 crores has been incurred on providing new facilities and beautifying the station with local art painting.

Following are some of the important salient features of the renovation done at the station:

1. Station facade got a facelift by ACP cladding with colours of blue and silver.

2. Circulating area had been upgraded and for smooth movement of traffic the station's parking area had been rearranged by construction of pathways.

3. First class waiting room had been renovated with texture paint and renovation done to second class waiting hall with good quality tiles, granite, and a false ceiling.

4. New mosaic tiles had been laid at the broken surface flooring of platforms and station.

5. Refreshment room at the station had been renovated by covering with false ceiling and good quality floor and wall tiles.

6. Renovation had also been made to the kitchen portion of the building.

7. Work is in progress for the construction of new foot over bridge and installation of new lifts and escalators.

8. A new pay and use toilet had been set up at the station for the convenience of passengers.

== Electrification ==
Electrification of the Barauni–Katihar–Guwahati line was sanctioned in 2008. In the document on Vision 2020 – A Blue Print for Railway Electrification Programme, in the list of ongoing projects the entire route km (836) is shown as balance work as on 1 April 2010.

== Track doubling ==
Doubling of the track between New Bongaigaon and Kamakhya via Rangia has been approved in the railway budget for 2013–14. As of 2026, It is successfully completed and operational.

Preceding station	Indian Railways	Following station
Ghoghrapar towards ?	Northeast Frontier Railway zone New Bongaigaon–Guwahati section	Kendukana towards ?
Terminus	Northeast Frontier Railway zone Rangiya–Murkongselek section	Khandikar towards ?
