= Rangiya railway division =

Railway division of India

Overview
- Operator: Northeast Frontier Railway
- Headquarters: Rangiya, Assam, India
- Locale: Assam, Meghalaya, Arunachal Pradesh
- Dates of operation: 1 April 2003; 23 years ago–

Technical
- Track gauge: Broad Gauge; Narrow Gauge
- Previous gauge: Metre Gauge
- Electrification: Constructed

Other
- Website: Northeast Frontier Railway website

Rangiya railway division is one of the five railway divisions under the jurisdiction of Northeast Frontier Railway zone of the Indian Railways. This railway division was formed on 1 April 2003 carved out from Alipurduar railway division and its headquarter is located at Rangiya in the state of Assam. Katihar, Lumding, Tinsukia and Alipurduar are the other four railway divisions under the NFR Zone headquartered at Maligaon, Guwahati.

== List of railway stations and towns ==
The list includes the stations under the Rangiya railway division and their station category.

Category of station	No. of stations	Names of stations
A-1	1	Rangiya Junction
A	3	New Bongaigaon Junction, Barpeta Road, Rangapara North Junction
B	3	Nalbari, Pathsala, Dudhnoi
C suburban station	2	Viswanath Charali, Tezpur
D	5	Udalguri, Harisinga, Rowta Bagan, New Missamari, Tangla, Murkongselek
E	-	-
F halt station	-	-
Total	14	-

== Serving districts ==
The Rangiya division serves the districts of Bongaigaon, Goalpara, Barpeta, Chirang, Nalbari, Udalguri, Baksa, Kamrup (Rural), Kamrup (Metro), Sonitpur, North Lakhimpur and Dhemaji in the state of Assam, West Kameng and Papumpare (Itanagar) in the state of Arunachal Pradesh and Resubelpara (North Garo Hills) in Meghalaya.
