= Rangiya–Murkongselek section =

Railway line in India

Rangiya–Murkongselek section (including Rangapara North-Dekargaon, Balipara-Bhalukpong & Harmuti-Naharlagun branch lines)
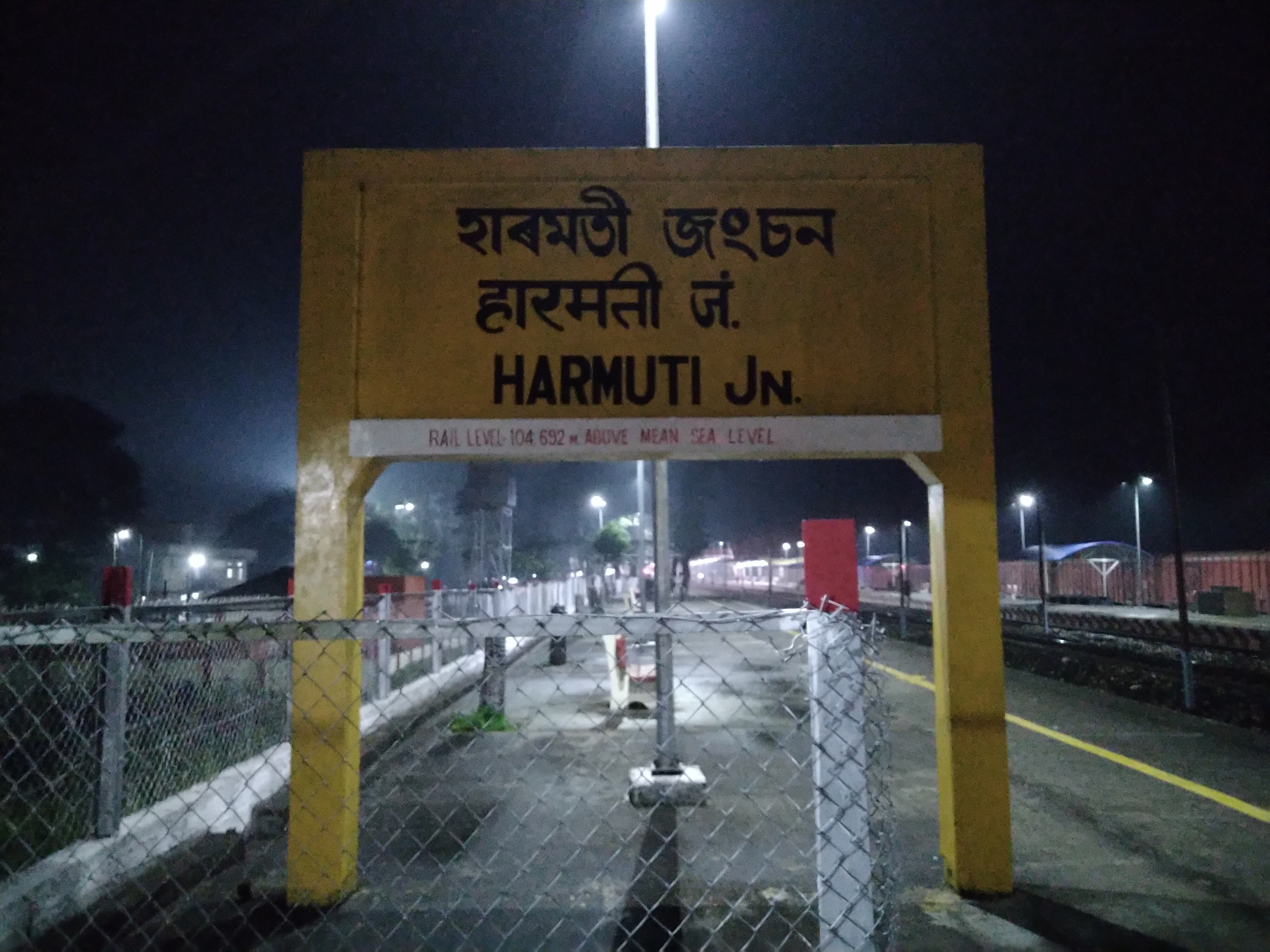
- Harmuti Junction an important railway station on Rangiya–Murkongselek section

Overview
- Status: Operational
- Owner: Indian Railways
- Locale: Assam
- Termini: Rangiya; Murkongselek

Service
- Operator: Northeast Frontier Railway

Technical
- Line length: 450 km (280 mi)
- Number of tracks: 1
- Track gauge: 1,676 mm (5 ft 6 in) Broad gauge
- Electrification: Yes

The Rangiya–Murkongselek section is a 450 km (280 mi) long railway line connecting Rangiya in Kamrup district with Murkongselek in Dhemaji district in the Indian state of Assam. The entire section is under the jurisdiction of Northeast Frontier Railway.

== History ==
=== Tezpur-Balipara Light Railway ===
The Tezpur-Balipara Light Railway was built as a 20 mi (32 km) long, 762 mm (2 ft 6 in) narrow gauge railway line between Tezpur and Balipara in 1895 with the primary aim of transporting tea from upcountry estates to the river port of Tezpur for onward shipment down the Brahmaputra to Calcutta. A 2 miles (3.2 km) extension to this line was made from Rangapara, then a station on this line, to Borjuli Tea estate as well. However, this line was closed to traffic on 1908.

This line continued to operate until 1952 before it was taken over by the North Eastern Railway and was converted to metre gauge.

=== Singri-Panchnoi River Tramway ===
The Singri-Panchnoi River Tramway was a privately owned narrow gauge line that ran northwards from Singri Ghat on the Brahmaputra River to the environs of Hugrajuli. The line opened in 1919 to transport tea down to the Singri Ghat.

=== Eastern Bengal Railway ===
Tracks were laid at Rangiya as a part of the extension of Eastern Bengal Railway's main metre gauge line from Sarbhog to Amingaon in 1909. The Tangla extension was built from Rangiya to Tangla in 1912. The line was extended to Rangapara North station on the Tezpur-Balipara Light Railway by 1933.

=== Post-independence ===
Post-independence the metre-gauge line was extended from Rangapara North to Murkongselek. The Balipara-Bhalukpong branch line was built in 1989–90.

== Conversion to broad gauge ==
The conversion of this section to broad gauge started on 2007–08. The Rangiya-Rangapara North-Dekargaon section was converted and opened for traffic in 2013. The Tezpur railway station was abandoned however owing to its proximity to Brahmaputra river which caused frequent flooding and Dekargaon railway station became the terminus of the branch line. The Rangapara North-Harmuti & Harmuti-North Lakhimpur sections were converted in 2014 and the North Lakhimpur-Sripani section was converted and opened in 2015. The final stretch between Sripani and Murkongselek along with the Balipara-Bhalukpong branch line was converted and opened to traffic in May 2015 as well.

== Branch lines ==
The 34 kilometres (21 mi) long Balipara-Bhalukpong branch line was built in 1989–90. The line was converted to broad gauge in May 2015.

The 18.5 kilometres (11.5 mi) long Harmuti-Naharlagun branch line was announced in 2008 and was opened in 2014 as a part of the Rangiya-Murkongselek gauge conversion project. This was declared a national project considering that it connected Itanagar, the capital of Arunachal Pradesh, with the Indian railway network.

The Bogibeel Bridge was sanctioned in 1997 and work started on it in 2002. It was intended to link the Rangiya-Murkongselek section on the north bank of the Brahmaputra with the Lumding-Dibrugarh section in the South bank. The work was completed on 2018 and the first train across the bridge was flagged off by Prime Minister Narendra Modi. The 31.83 kilometres (19.78 mi) line is now a daily useful link between Assam & Arunachal.

== Proposed projects and extensions ==
Three national projects of strategic importance are proposed in this section primarily focusing on providing connectivity with Arunachal Pradesh. A broad gauge railway track is proposed from the existing rail head at Bhalukpong to Tawang via Tenga & Dirang. Another Lakhimpur-Bame-Silapathar line is proposed from North Lakhimpur to Silapathar via Bame & Aalo. The terminal station of the section is also expected to be moved from Murkongselek to Parshuram Kund in Arunachal Pradesh, via Pasighat and Tezu and to further connect it to the Lumding–Dibrugarh section at Rupai.

The 25 km (16 mi) long Silghat Town-Dekargaon new line project has been sanctioned to connect Silghat on the south bank of Brahmaputra on the Chaparmukh-Silghat branch line with Dekargaon. This also entails the building of a new railway bridge across the Brahmaputra River.

== See also ==
- Railway in Arunachal Pradesh
- North Eastern Railway Connectivity Projects
- India–China Border Roads
