= Nona River =

River in India

- Location within Assam Location within India
- Native name: নোনা নদী (Assamese)

Location
- State: Assam
- District: Baksa district Nalbari district

Physical characteristics
- Source: Samdrup Jongkhar
  - location: Bhutan
  - coordinates: 26°49′17.5″N 91°33′26.1″E
- Mouth: Baralia River
  - location: Near Kismat Village, Nalbari district, Assam
  - coordinates: 26°22′49.2″N 91°32′03.8″E

Basin features
- Progression: Nona River - Baralia River -Puthimari River- Brahmaputra River

The Nona River is a sub-tributary of the Brahmaputra River in the Indian state of Assam. The Nona River originates in the hills of Samdrup Jongkhar and flows through Baksa district and Nalbari district in Assam before its confluence with the Baralia River.
