= 1997 Nislamari massacre =

Terrorist incident in Assam, India

Nislamari massacre
- Part of the Insurgency in Northeast India
- Location: Nichlamari, Darrang district, Assam, India
- Date: 30 December 1997 (UTC+5:30)
- Target: Bengali Hindus
- Attack type: Massacre
- Weapon: firearms
- Deaths: 12
- Injuries: 3
- Perpetrator: National Democratic Front of Bodoland

On 30 December 1997, gunmen belonging to National Democratic Front of Bodoland gunned down 12 Bengali Hindus in the outskirts of Nislamari in Darrang district (now in Udalguri district) in the state of Assam. The dead included a six-month-old baby and six women. On the next day the group attacked another village nearby and killed 9 Bengalis.

== Background ==
Following non-implementation of the 1993 Bodo Accord, the erstwhile Bodo Security Force transformed itself into National Democratic Front of Bodoland with the stated goal of secession from India and the formation of a sovereign Bodoland. The Christian dominated NDFB targeted the minority ethnic groups in the Bodo inhabited areas. NDFB also violently clashed for supremacy with the Hindu-dominated the Bodo Liberation Tigers Force that espoused the formation of a Bodo autonomous region within Assam. In this violent battle for supremacy, the Bodo Liberation Tigers Force aligned with the Bengali Liberation Tigers for the protection of the Bengali Hindu people from the NDFB attacks. On 30 December 1997, the massacre took place in the outskirts of Nislamari (also spelled Nichlamari) about the 28 kilometers from Tangla in Darrang district (now in Udalguri district). According to Assam police the NDFB insurgents were targeting Bengali Liberation Tigers cadres in the area.

== Killings ==
On 30 December 1997, at around 8 PM IST, a group of NDFB militants entered the Nislamari locality. They dragged 15 Bengali Hindus from four houses and fired on them. Twelve persons including a six-month-old baby and six women died on the spot. Three persons were critically injured. Following the incident the villagers didn't allow the authorities to take the bodies for autopsy till the Chief Minister Prafulla Kumar Mahanta visited the village.
