= Bhairabkunda =

- city
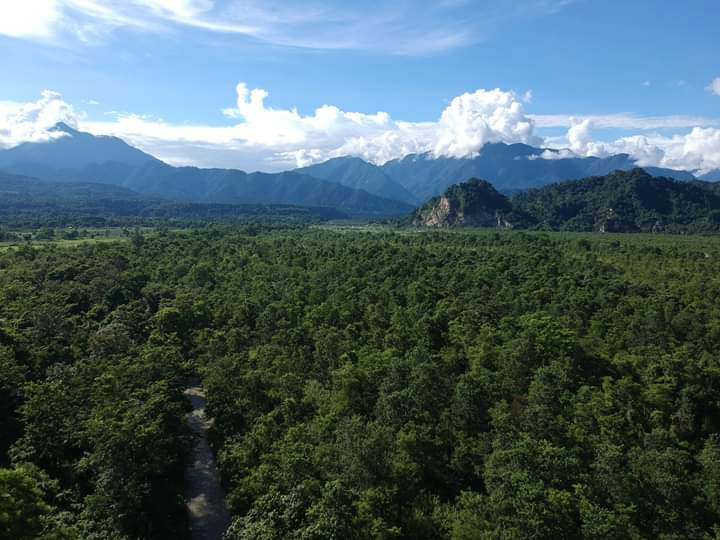
- View of Gethsemanene Man-made forest

- Location in Assam, India Bhairabkunda (India)
- Coordinates: 26.8900°N 92.1150°E
- Country: India
- State: Assam
- District: Udalguri
- Elevation: 703 m (2,306 ft)

Languages
  - Official: Bodo
- Time zone: UTC+5:30 (IST / BST)
- ISO 3166 code: IN-AS
- Vehicle registration: AS

Bhairabkunda is a popular picnic spot in Udalguri district in the State of Assam, India. It is situated on the border of Bhutan.

The Jampani River, originating in Bhutan, and Bhairabi River merge here to form Dhanshiri River. Dhanshiri river is a major tributary of Brahmaputra river. An irrigation project was constructed on Dhanshiri river at Bhairabkunda. A guide dam was constructed inside Bhutan for this project. The Project is situated in Udalguri District within jurisdiction of Bodoland Territorial Region (B.T.R.) aimed to provide assured irrigation to an area of 41.683 hectares (103.00 acres) in five development blocks viz. Udalguri, Rowta, Kalaigaon, Mazbat and Bechimari under Udalguri Civil Sub-Division.

Along with the irrigation project, a hydro-electric project was also planned to generate 20 MW of electricity out of 5 No. falls per 9 metres (30 ft) drop, but it did not materialise.

== Geography ==
Bhairabkunda has an average elevation of 703 metres. It stands as one of the famous picnic spots in Assam. Both locals and tourists are drawn towards this place because of its location and features. One attraction of the place is that it shares border with Bhutan and stands as a suitable entrypoint to the country. People can also cross the international border on foot from here and visit the adjacent Daifam town. There is also a suspension bridge made with steel cables that connects Bhairabkunda with Daifam, which is a tourist destination, and a spot for photography.

== Tourist Places ==
1. Bhairabkunda Picnic Spot- Thousands of picnickers visit this place through November to early February.
2. Bhairabkunda Shiva Mandir- Geographically located in Bhutan, but near Bhairabkunda town. Significant Number of devotees visit this place throughout the year. The number, however, increases during special occasions.
3. Gethsemane Man-made Forest- A forest grown entirely by local JFMC of 35 members with the help of Forest department of Assam. Spread across more than 6 km^{2}. With more than 14 lakh plus trees of over 35 varieties. A number of animals, birds and reptiles can also be seen here. Visitors can also stay the night in their Guest house.

== Bhairabkunda Tourism Festival ==
Bhairabkunda Tourism Festival is organised during the month of January every year. The event is organised in the bank of river Dhansiri and Bhairabkunda Tourism Complex. The main objective of this event is to promote tourism in the locality and to expose the vibrant local culture. The main attractions of this events are folk dance and music, traditional cuisines and traditional dresses shows from across the Northeast region as well as from Bhutan. Other activities in the event include elephant and Jeep safari as well.

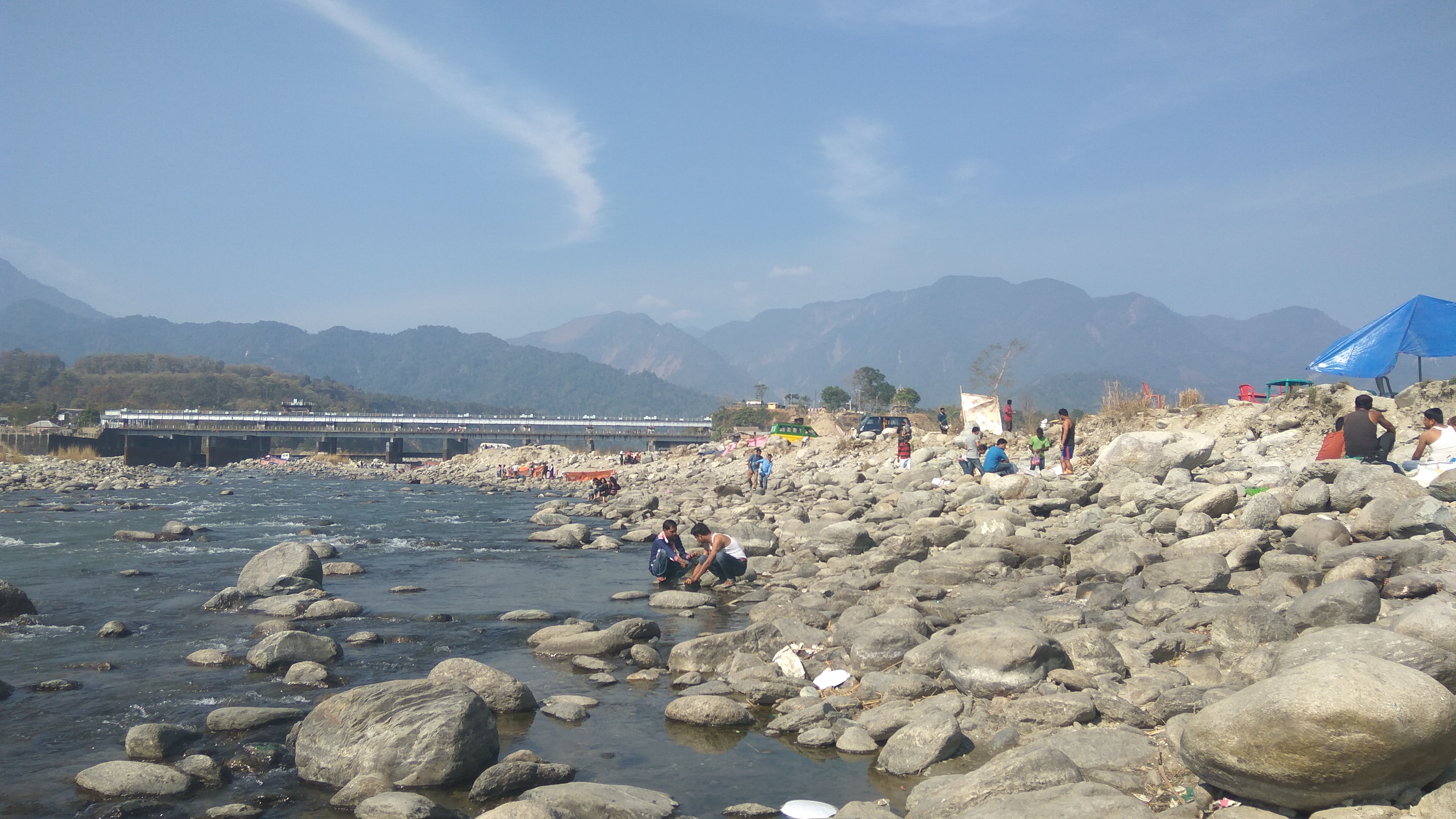
Dhansiri river in Bhairabkunda

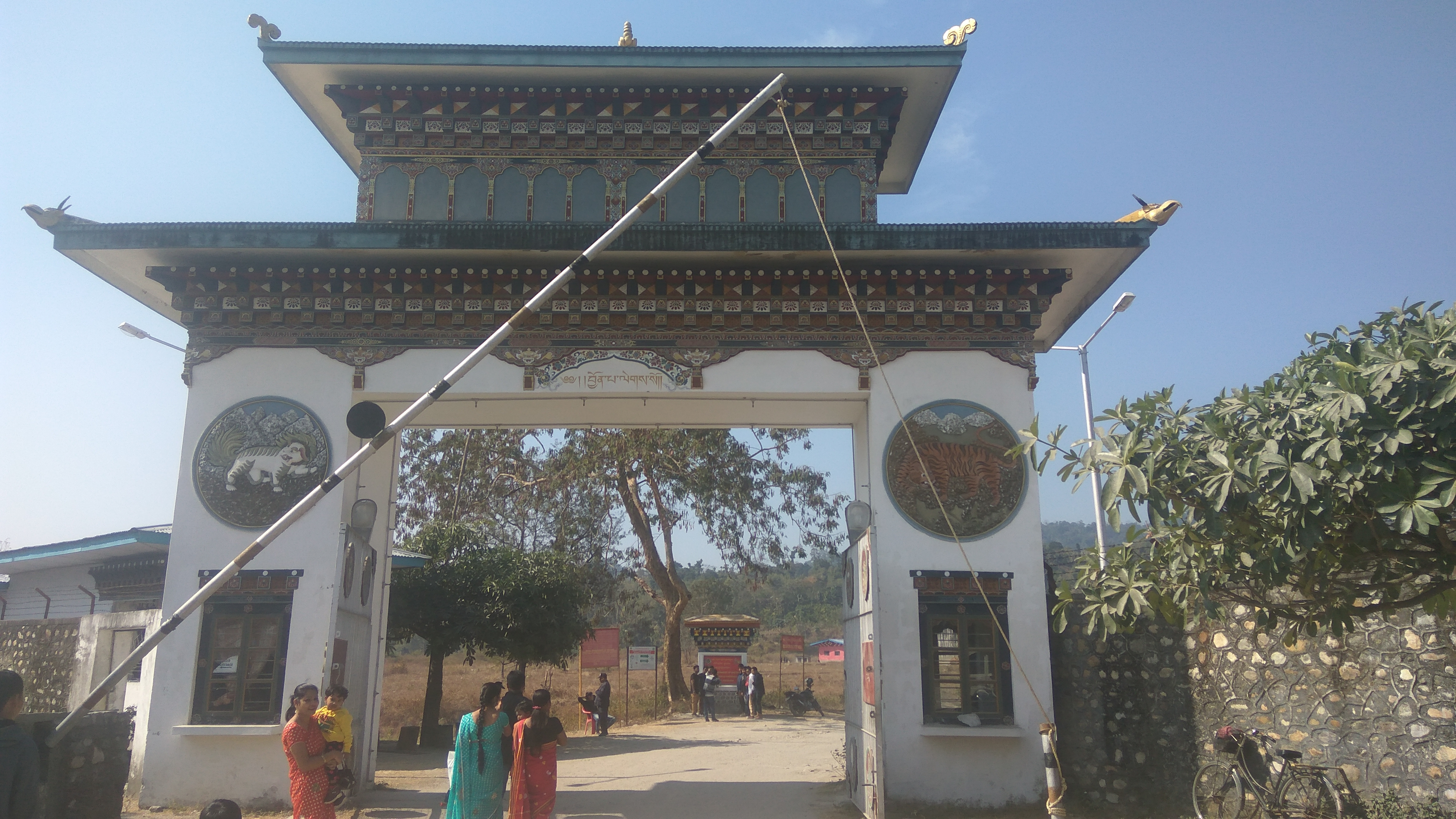
Gate at India-Bhutan international border in Bhairabkunda

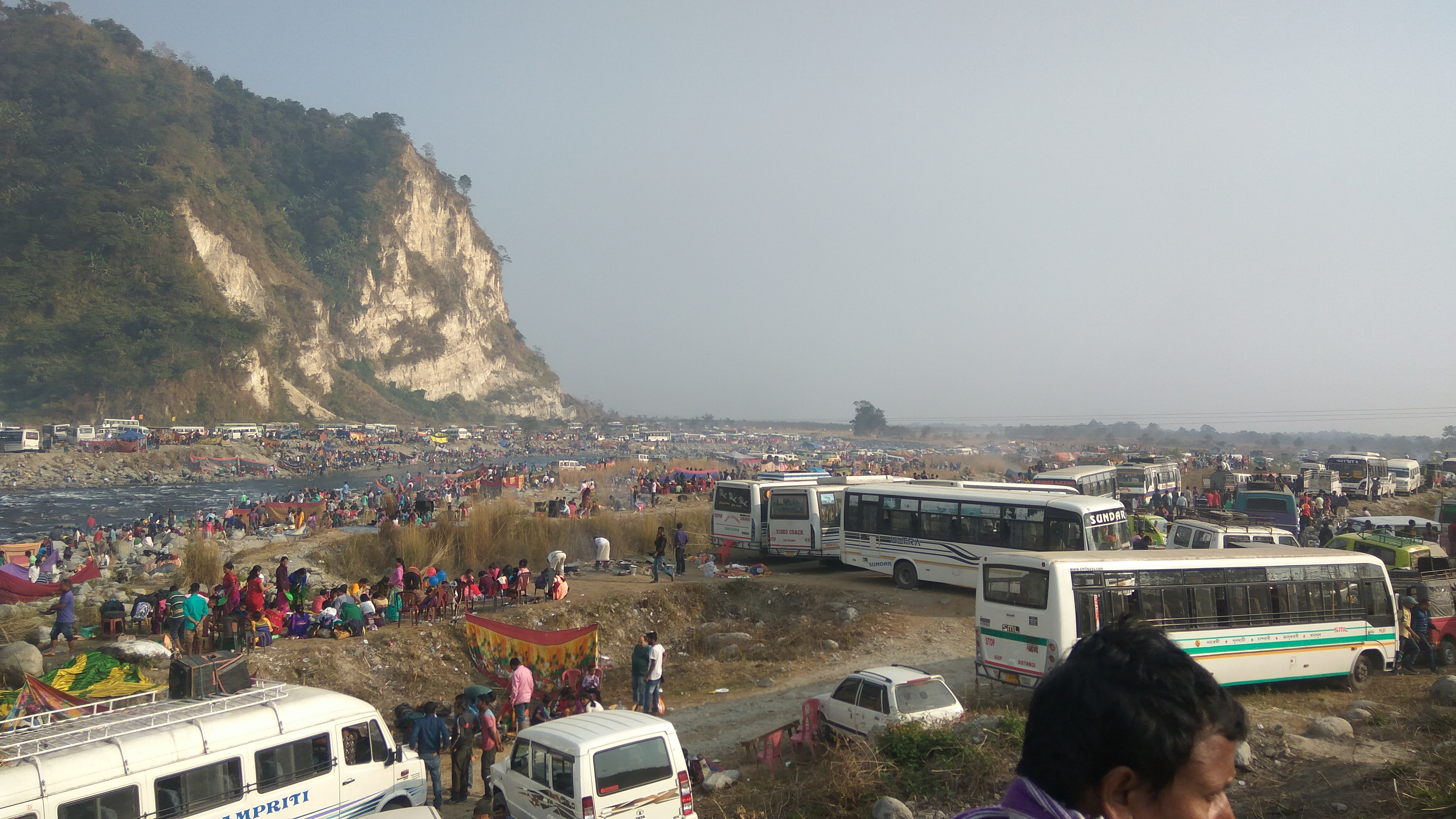
Bhairabkunda picnic spot

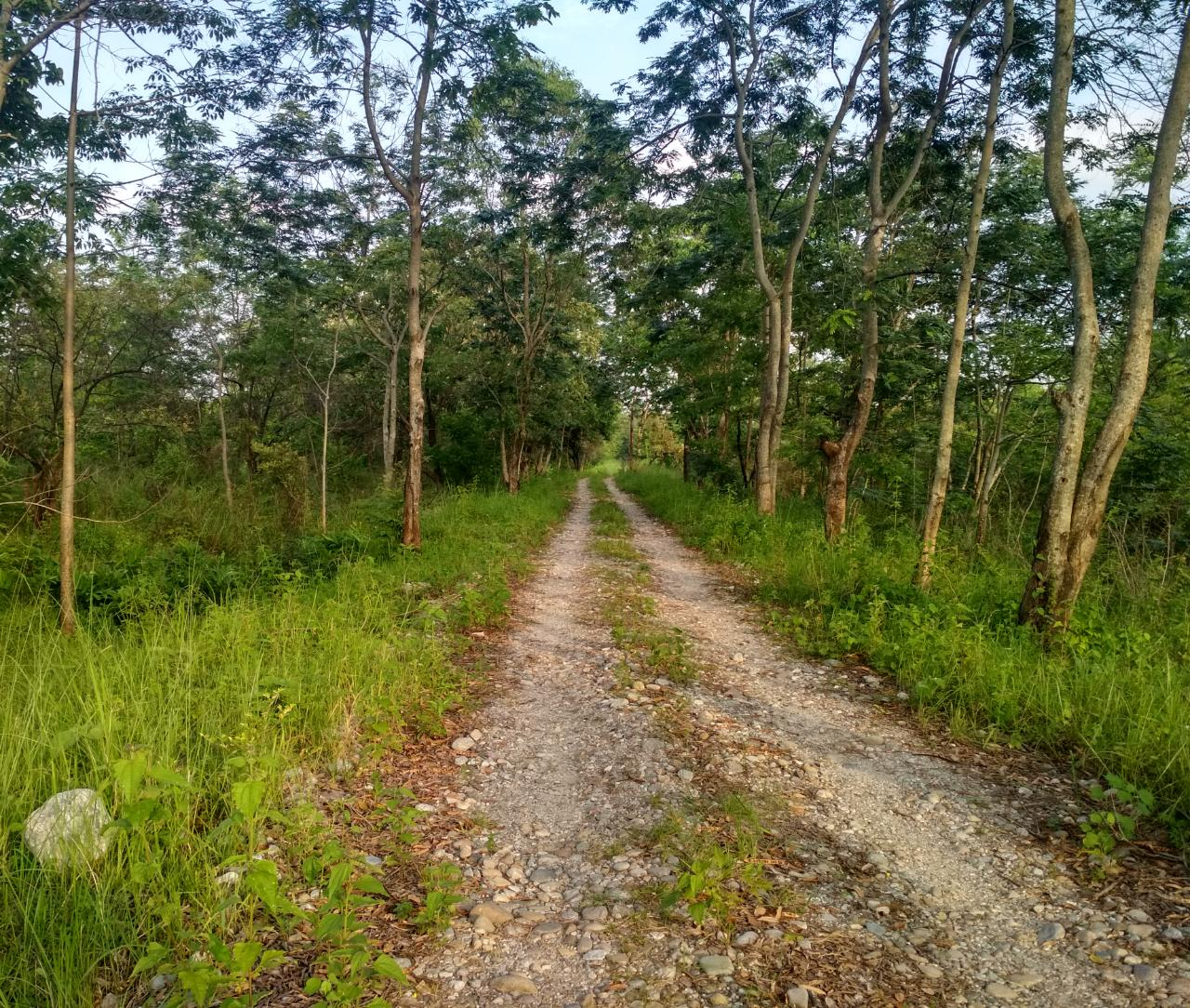
Gethsemane Man-made Forest

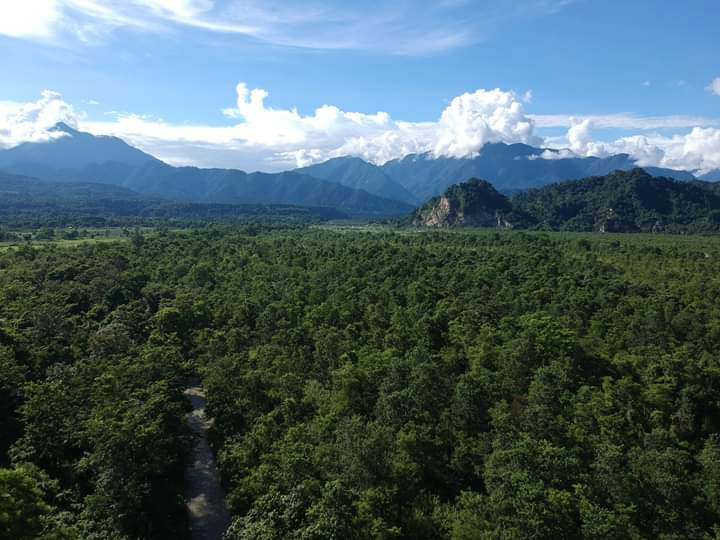
Aerial View of Gethsemane Man-made Forest

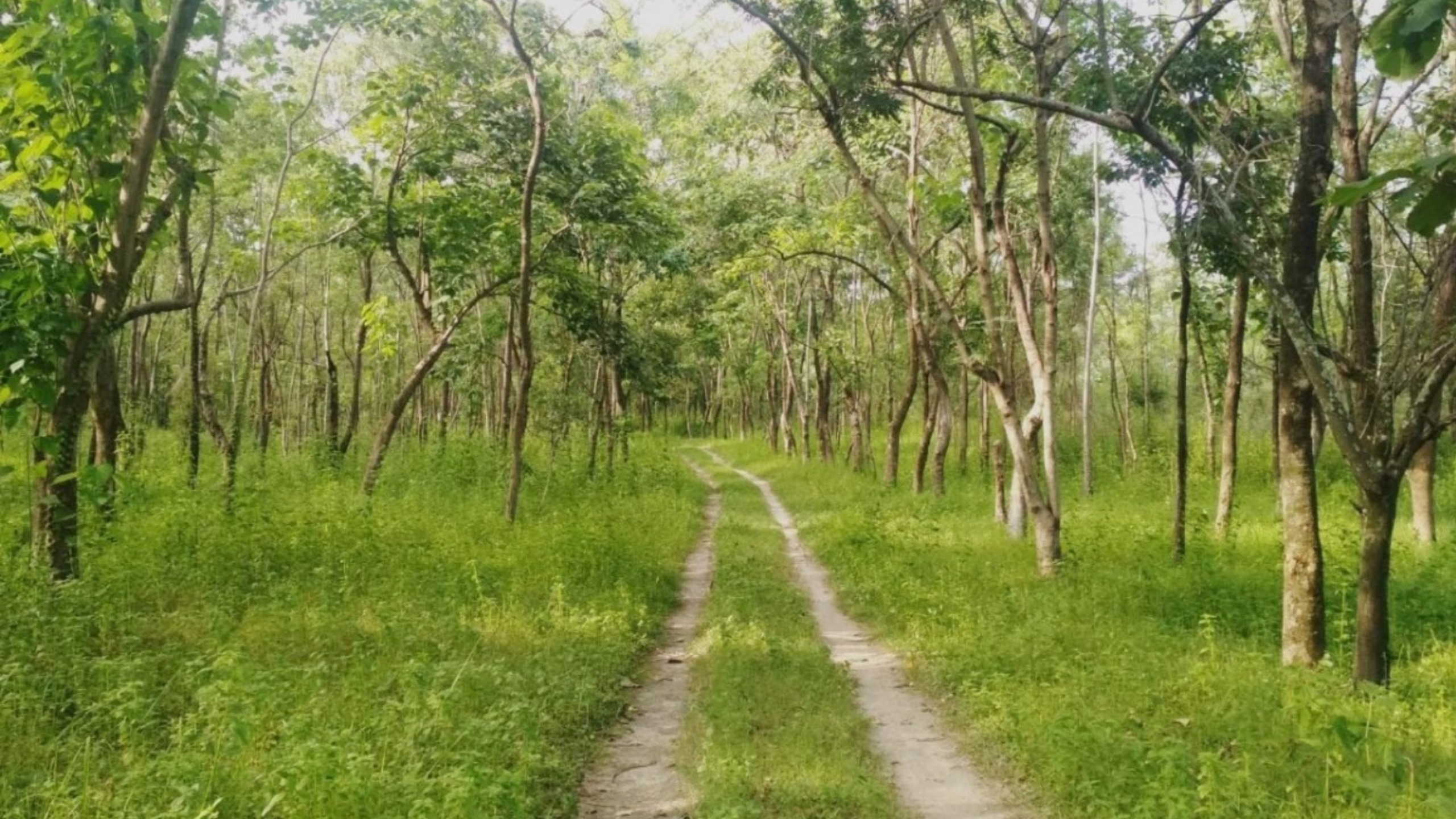
Gethsemane Man-made Forest
