= Uhiaguri =

Udhiaguri
- village
- Country: India
- State: Assam
- District: Baksa

Languages
  - Official: Bodo, English
- Time zone: UTC+5:30 (IST)
- Postal code: 781318

Udhiaguri is a small village near Salbari in Baksa district in the Indian state of Assam.
