= Pakriguri =

Pakriuri
- village
- Location in Assam, India Pakriuri (India)
- Country: India
- State: Assam
- District: Baksa

Languages
  - Official: Bodo, English
- Time zone: UTC+5:30 (IST)
- Postal code: 781318

Pakriguri is a small village near Salbari Bazaar in Baksa district in Indian state of Assam.
