= Dumunibagan =

Village in India

Dumunibagan Doomni, Doomni Bagan, Dumuni Bagan
- Village
- Map of Assam Dumunibagan (India)
- Coordinates: 26.71753°N 91.31067°E
- Country: India
- State: Assam
- District: Baksa

Area
  - Total: 1,235.62 ha (3,053.3 acres)

Population (2011)
  - Total: 6,855
  - Density: 554.8/km^{2} (1,437/sq mi)

Languages
  - Official: Assamese
- Time zone: UTC+5:30 (IST)
- Postal code: 781373
- STD Code: 03623
- Vehicle registration: AS-28
- Census code: 304475

Dumunibagan, commonly known as Doomni and Dumuni, is a census village in Baksa district (earlier Nalbari district), Assam, India. The Dumni Tea Estate, tea cultivation area, is located in the village.

As per the 2011 Census of India, Dumunibagan village has a population of 6,855 people, including 3,412 males and 3,443 females with a literacy rate of 80.29%e.
