= Baralia River =

River in India

- Location within Assam Location within India
- Native name: বৰলীয়া নদী (Assamese)

Location
- State: Assam
- District: Tamulpur Kamrup Nalbari
- Sub-district: Rangia
- Cities: Rangia

Physical characteristics
- Source: Lokhaitora River
  - location: Bornadi Wildlife Sanctuary
  - coordinates: 26°43′26.9″N 91°41′08.4″E
- Mouth: Puthimari River
  - coordinates: 26°15′29.6″N 91°27′57″E

Basin features
- Progression: Lokhaitora River - Baralia River - Puthimari River - Brahmaputra River

The Baralia River is a sub-tributary of the Brahmaputra River in the Indian state of Assam. The Baralia River originates in the Nagrijuli Tea Estate and flows through Rangia City, Nalbari district and Tamulpur district before its confluence with the Puthimari River and the Brahmaputra River. The Nona River is a tributary of the Baralia river.
