= Nagrijuli =

Locality in Assam, India

- Gram Panchayat, Tehsil
- Map of Assam Nagrijuli (India)
- Coordinates: 26.7107°N 91.6758°E
- Country: India
- State: Assam
- District: Tamulpur
- Tehsil: Nagrijuli

Area
  - Total: 7,426 ha (18,350 acres)

Population (2011)
  - Total: 94,137
  - Density: 1,268/km^{2} (3,283/sq mi)

Languages
  - Official: Assamese
- Time zone: UTC+5:30 (IST)
- Postal code: 781368
- STD Code: 03624
- Vehicle registration: AS-28
- Census code: 304621

Nagrijuli is an urban locality and Gram Panchayat (Block) in Baksa district, Assam, India. Nagrijuli is an area with 7,426 hectares, and has a tea estate.

As per the 2011 Census of India, the Nagrijuli area has a total population of 94,137 people including 47,823 males and 46,314 females.
