= Jomotsangkha =

Jomotsangkha Daifam Throm
- Location in Bhutan
- Coordinates: 26°54′N 92°6′E
- Country: Bhutan
- District: Samdrup Jongkhar
- Sub-district: Jomotsangkha Dungkhag
- Village block: Langchenphu Gewog

Population (2017)
  - Total: 1,136

Jomotsangkha is a town in south-eastern Bhutan, located in Samdrup Jongkhar District. At the 2005 census, it had a population of 957. It is connected by road with the Indian town of Bhairabkunda. It is said that during the 1950s and 1960s this place used to produce a significant amount of milk, curd, cheese and butter, hence the name Dairy-farm, which gradually became Daifam.

== Transport ==
Although there are some local roads and farm roads, the town currently has no internal road connecting it with the rest of the country and residents have to travel via Assam, India to reach other places in Bhutan. Construction of a 58km road connecting Jomotsangkha with Samdrup Jongkhar, the district capital, via Samrang was begun in 2016. The good news is that recently the DANTAK, who is taking up the road construction from Jomotsangkha to Samrang has notified the public of its opening to traffic from November 2021. Though as of now the road is just being strewn with GSB and is playable Bloero and other bigger categories of vehicles, the DANTAK has notified that come 2023, it will get black topped.

== Visitor attractions ==
=== Religious sites ===
Nearby Jomotsangkha is the Bhairabkunda Shiva Mandir, a Shakta pitha and one of the most important Hindu temples in Bhutan. It is enclosed within a 15 foot tall wall due to security and safety reasons.

=== Jomotsangkha Wildlife Sanctuary ===
Jomotsangkha Wildlife Sanctuary (JWS), earlier known as the Khaling Wildlife Sanctuary, was notified in 1993. The sanctuary has an area of 334.73sq.km. The Sanctuary links to the Sakteng Wildlife Sanctuary and Royal Manas National Park.
