= Simlabari (Baksa district) =

Village in India

Simlabari Simlubari
- Village
- Map of Assam Simlabari (India)
- Coordinates: 26.7217°N 91.4411°E
- Country: India
- State: Assam
- District: Baksa
- Tehsil: Baganpara

Area
  - Total: 902.27 ha (2,229.6 acres)
- Elevation: 75 m (246 ft)

Population (2011)
  - Total: 4,357
  - Density: 482.9/km^{2} (1,251/sq mi)

Languages
  - Official: Assamese
- Time zone: UTC+5:30 (IST)
- Postal code: 781372
- STD Code: 03624
- Vehicle registration: AS-28
- Census code: 304566

Simlabari, also known as Simlubari, is a census village in Baksa district, Assam, India. As per the 2011 Census of India, the Simlabari village has a total population of 4,357 people including 2,206 males and 2,151 females with a literacy rate of 54.56%.
