= Mohina =

Village Baksa district

- Village
- Interactive map of Mohina
- Coordinates: 26.56250°N 91.45053°E
- Country: India
- State: Assam
- District: Baksa
- Region: BTR

Area
  - Total: 525.19 ha (1,297.8 acres)

Population (2011)
  - Total: 3,261
  - Density: 620.9/km^{2} (1,608/sq mi)

Languages
  - Official: Assamese
- Time zone: UTC+5:30 (IST)

Mohina is a census village located in Baganpara Circle of Baksa district, Assam, India. Mohina village has a population of total 3,261 people, where 1,704 are males and 1,557 are females as per 2011 Census of India.
