= Athiabari =

Village in Baksa district, Assam, India

- Village
- Map of Assam Athiabari (India)
- Coordinates: 26.5015°N 90.9988°E
- Country: India
- State: Assam
- District: Baksa
- Region: Baksa

Area
  - Total: 276.17 ha (682.4 acres)
- Elevation: 75 m (246 ft)

Population (2011)
  - Total: 4,234
  - Density: 1,533/km^{2} (3,971/sq mi)

Languages
  - Official: Assamese
- Time zone: UTC+5:30 (IST)
- Postal code: 781377
- STD Code: 03624
- Vehicle registration: AS-28
- Census code: 304162

Athiabari is a census village in Baksa district, Assam, India. As per the 2011 Census of India, Athiabari has a total population of 4,234 people including 2,141 males and 2,093 females.
