= Pamuapathar =

Village in India

Pamuapathar (also written as Pamuapather) is a village in the Baksa District of Assam, India. Originally a jungle, gradually people settled there from nearby locations.

== Sources ==
- Pamuapathar; www.mapsofindia.com
