= Gethsemane Man-made Forest =

- Reserve Forest
- Bhairabkunda JFMC

Area
  - Total: 7.36 km^{2} (2.84 sq mi)

Gethsemane Man-made Forest is a community-led forest conservation initiative by the JFMC comprising six nearby villages under the Dhansiri Reserve Forest division. It is a Plantation Centre consisting of more than 14 lakh plants of over 35 species, spread across 5500 bigha. The forest regeneration initiative began in 2005 to transform the barren forest land impacted by illegal afforestation during the 1980s.

== Impact ==
The man-made forest now has over 14 lakh plants such as khoir, gomari, simul, shisham, etc. Many wild animals have returned to the forest. Animals such as elephant, leopard, wild boar, tiger, deer, etc. and reptiles such as paradise flying snake and python are found in the forest. The Lepidiota Mansueta beetle species is commonly found in the forest along with various species of butterflies and dragonflies. It is also home to various Himalayan, native and migratory birds. The emergence of forest has contributed towards the reduction of man-elephant conflict in the area.

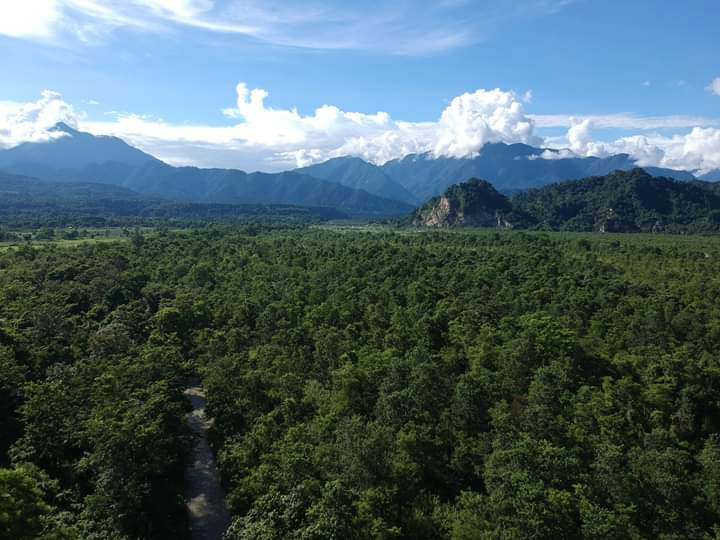
Aerial view of Gethsemane man-made forest

== Eco-Tourism ==
The forest is growing as an eco-tourism destination in the region, and thus the initiative is helping local communities. It has many trekking trails as well as cycling strips for adventure sports enthusiasts.

== Geography ==
The man-made forest is spread across 5500 bighas beside the river Dhansiri on the foothills of Bhutan and Arunachal Pradesh. There are also various brooks inside the forest which are dug to satiate the trees during drought seasons.

== History ==
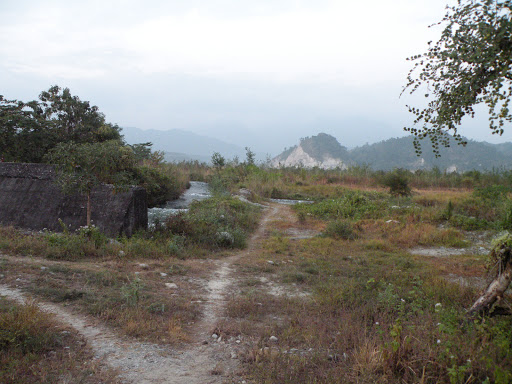
Barren land prior to plantation

The 35 members of the JFMC began working the barren land under the name “Sonaigaon Multipurpose farm” for cultivation as well as farming purposes in 2003. Their effort gained support through the initiative of the then Forest Range Officer Naba Kumar Bordoloi of Bhairabkunda RF. He inducted the group into six JFMC and in 2005 a proposal was submitted to Ministry of Environment and Forest India. It was approved and the plantation under the Ministerial support extended from 2007 to 2011.

== Awards and recognition ==
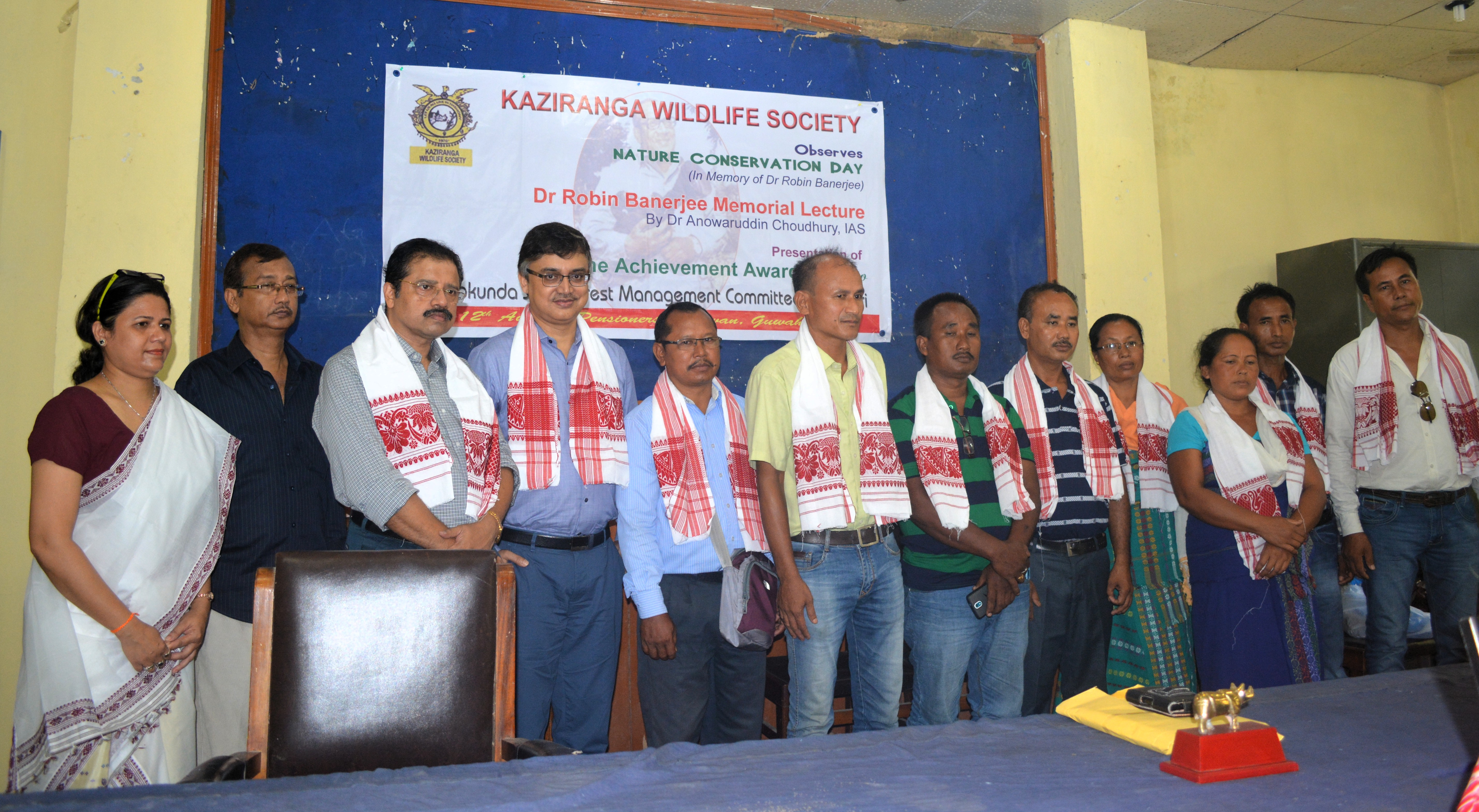
KWS Award Ceremony

The JFMC has been awarded the ‘Lifetime Achievement Award’ by the Kaziranga Wildlife Society (KWS) in 2016 and ‘Eastern Himalayan Conservation Award’ by Balipara Foundation in 2017.

== See also ==
- Bhairabkunda
- Udalguri
