= Khoirabari railway station =

Railway station in Assam

Khoirabari Railway Station

General information
- Location: Seleimari, Khoirabari, Udalguri district, Assam; India
- Coordinates: 26.626143°N 91.840413°E
- Elevation: 73 metres (240 ft)
- System: Indian Railways station
- Owner: Indian Railways
- Operator: Northeast Frontier Railway
- Line: Rangiya–Murkongselek section
- Platforms: 2
- Tracks: 1

Construction
- Structure type: Standard (on ground station)
- Parking: No
- Cycle facilities: No

Other information
- Status: Single diesel line
- Station code: KBY
- Zone(s): Northeast Frontier Railway
- Division(s): Rangiya

History
- Rebuilt: 2015

Services
| Preceding station | Indian Railways | Following station |
|---|---|---|
| Goreswar towards ? | Northeast Frontier Railway zone Rangiya–Murkongselek section | Tangla towards ? |
Location
- Location within Assam Location within India

Khoirabari railway station is a railway station on Rangiya–Murkongselek section under Rangiya railway division of Northeast Frontier Railway zone. This railway station is situated at Seleimari, Khoirabari in Udalguri district in the Indian state of Assam.
