= Khoirabari =

Town in Assam, India

- Town
- Khoirabari Town
- Location in Assam, India Khoirabari (India)
- Coordinates: 26°42′43″N 92°12′20″E
- Country: India
- State: Assam
- Region: Lower Assam
- District: Udalguri

Government
  - Type: Municipal Board
  - Body: Khoirabari Municipal Board

Area
  - Total: 56.93 ha (140.7 acres)

Population (2011)
  - Total: 873
  - Male: 443
  - Female: 430

Language
  - Official: Assamese, Bodo

Houses
  - Total: 214
- Time zone: UTC+05:30 (IST)
- PIN: 784522
- Telephone code: 03711
- Vehicle registration: AS-27 (Udalguri)
- Literacy: 80.64%
- Website: https://udalguri.assam.gov.in/

Khoirabari is a small town in Udalguri district in the Indian state of Assam. Khoirabari serves as the Sub-divisional headquarters of Khoirabari Sub-division. The total geographical area of town is 56.93 hectares. Khoirabari Town has a total population of 873 peoples, out of which male population is 443 while female population is 430. Literacy rate of Khoirabari town village is 80.64% out of which 85.10% males and 76.05% females are literate.

There are about 214 houses in Khoirabari town village. Pincode of Khoirabari town village locality is 784522. Khoirabari is located 40 KM towards west from District headquarters Udalguri. It is a Tehsil head quarter. Rangia, Mangaldoi, Nalbari, Guwahati are the nearby Cities to Khoirabari.

== Demographics ==
As of 2001 India census, Khoirabari had a population of 8,703. Males constitute 52% of the population and females 48%. Khoirabari has an average literacy rate of 74%, higher than the national average of 59.5%: male literacy is 80%, and female literacy is 69%.

Assamese, Bodo and Bengali are the major language. But the most commonly spoken languages include Bodo is spoken widely in the surrounding areas. The locals can even interact in Hindi.

A number of tea gardens are located nearby and Khoirabari is the nearest commercial access point for them.

== Education ==
Educational Institutions include

- Khoirabari College

== Facilities ==
- Nearest railway station: Khoirabari railway station
- Khoirabari Nearest Airport : LGBI Airport (Guwahati)
- Nearest hospital: Khoirabari Gramin Hospital.

== Major festivals ==
Rongali Bihu and Boisagu are in April; Durga Puja in October; Diwali and Holy also celebrated across Khoirabari and surrounding areas.

== See also ==
- Odalguri
- Nalbari
- Mangaldoi
