= Koklabari Chapaguri College =

Koklabari Chapaguri College, Hazuwa
- Type: Public
- Established: 18 August 2013
- Affiliations: Bodoland University
- Principal: Joushrung Baro
- Location: Hazuwa, Baksa district, Bodoland, Assam, India; 26.7072087°N 91.1946736°E
- Campus: building
- Website: www.kcchazuwa.ac.in

Koklabari Chapaguri College (Bodo: ककलाबारि चापागुरि फरायसालिमा) is an educational institute in the village of Hazuwa, Baksa district, Assam, India, affiliated to Bodoland University. The college offers Bachelor of Arts degrees.

== Academics ==
The college offers Bachelor of Arts degrees, both Honours and Regular, in Bodo, Assamese, English, philosophy, economics, education, and political science.
