= Barama =

Barama may be,

- Barama River, Guyana
- Barama language, Gabon
- Barama (Vidhan Sabha constituency)
- Barama College
