= Charaimari =

- Village in Assam
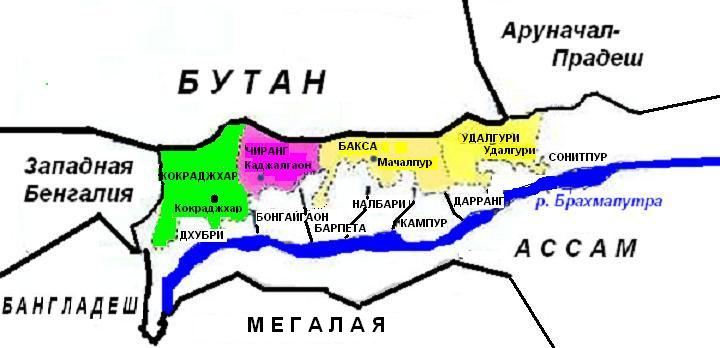
- Flag

- Location in Assam, India Charaimari (India)
- Country: India
- State: Assam
- District: Baksa-BTR-Bodoland Territorial Autonomous District
- Elevation: 51 m (167 ft)

Population (2011)
  - Total: 1,642

Languages
  - Official: Bodo, Assamese
- Time zone: UTC+5:30 (IST)
- PIN: 781377
- Telephone code: 03624 XXXXXX
- ISO 3166 code: IN-AS
- Vehicle registration: AS-28
- Website: baksa.gov.in

Charaimari is a village near Mushalpur town in Baksa district of Assam state of India.

== Zip code charaimari ==
Pin Code of charaimariis 781377 which comes under nalbari postal division (Assam Circle)
