= Salbari Higher Secondary School =

Salbari Higher Secondary School सालबारि गोजौसिन फरायसालि
- Salbari HS School

Location
- State Highway 6, Salbari, Baksa, Assam, 781318; India; 26.6419288°N 91.0935664°E

Information
- Type: Upper primary, secondary and higher secondary, public, co-educational
- Motto: Unity and spread of education
- Established: 20 March 1955
- School district: Baksa, Jalah Block
- Authority: Government of Assam
- Principal: Toppeswar Basumatary (2015-present)
- Vice principal: Kenedi Ramchiary
- Faculty: 36
- Grades: 6-12
- Enrollment: Approximately 1100
- Language: Bodo, Assamese, English
- Campus size: 16 class rooms
- Campus type: government building
- Website: Shss.com

Salbari Higher Secondary School (commonly called Salbari Model H.S. School), a school in Salbari, Baksa, Assam, India, is situated in between the Ulubari village and Salbari bazaar. The school was established in 1955 to impart secondary education in Bodo and Assamese medium to the children of the rural and economically backward of the Baksa district. It is one of four schools in the state that are education for sustainable development model schools.

== Location ==
Salbari is in the Salbari sub-division in the Baksa District of Assam. It is situated by Manas National Park near the Indo-Bhutan border, and rapidly growing towards becoming a city.

== History ==
The school was established in 1955 as a high school at the initiative of local social workers and well wishers. The school is now upgraded to a higher secondary school with the introduction of 11th and 12th classes of science and arts stream of the Indian education system.

In 2013, the nearby Salbari Bazaar was designated a Plastic Free Zone through the environmental activism of Salbari H.S. School students.

== Management ==
The school is managed by the principal, vice principal and senior teachers. There is a governing council which supervises some administrative affairs and developmental aspects of the school.

== Education ==
The school imparts education from 6th standard to 12th standard of the Indian education system (10 + 2) arts and science, leading to certificates (HSLC, HSSLC).

== Model school for education for sustainable development ==
In 2013, Salbari Higher Secondary School was chosen as a model school by WWF-India for their Education for Sustainable Development project. Mita Nangia Goswami, the director of Environment Education, cited the school as a success story:

When we went to Salbari for the first time, its campus was an eye sore. It was litter-infested. Toilets were dirty and classrooms a complete mess. After a workshop with them, when we visited again in three months, it was a changed site. Students had made a traffic club which would monitor traffic congestion on campus; dustbins lay at all possible places, steel cups replaced plastic cups. They had also set up a nature library full of environment related books from which the students would borrow, read and write back the moral of the story he/she read, to be awarded if chosen best — thus enhancing reading and comprehension.

The students had also transformed the nearby market area into a ‘Plastic Free Zone’. Since the school is close to the Manas National Park, the students also set up a bird watching club and formed fences to protect saplings they had planted in the school. They made a worm-compost pit in the school backyard, created a gardening cum fruits hub and conserved local fish.
