= Nikashi =

Village in Assam, India

- Village
- Map of Assam Nikashi (India)
- Coordinates: 26.7314°N 91.3789°E
- Country: India
- State: Assam
- District: Baksa

Area
  - Total: 588.06 ha (1,453.1 acres)

Population (2011)
  - Total: 2,510
  - Density: 427/km^{2} (1,110/sq mi)

Languages
  - Official: Assamese
- Time zone: UTC+5:30 (IST)
- Postal code: 781372
- STD Code: 03623
- Vehicle registration: AS-28
- Census code: 304471

Nikashi is a census village in Baksa district, Assam, India. As per the 2011 Census of India, Nikashi village has a total population of 2,510 people including 1,261 males and 1,249 females with a literacy rate of 62.83%.
