= Puthimari River =

River in Assam, India

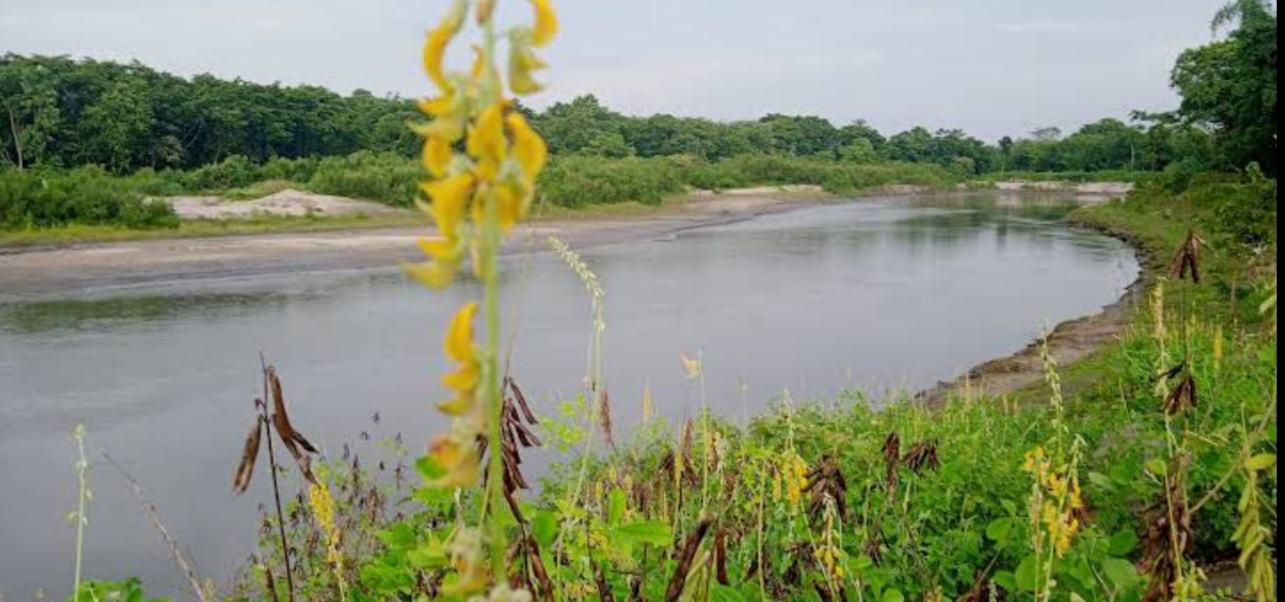
- The Puthimari River is located in the village of Bagaribari near Rangia

- Location within Assam Location within India

Location
- Country: India
- State: Assam
- District: Kamrup, Baksa
- Sub-division: Rangia, Hajo
- Cities: Rangia, Hajo

Physical characteristics
- Source
  - location: Balabari
  - coordinates: 26.5770788°N 91.667087°E
- Mouth
  - coordinates: 26.2510148°N 91.435833°E

Basin features
- Progression: Puthimari, Brahmaputra River
- Tributaries
  - left: Suklai River
  - right: Lokhaitora River

The Puthimari River rises in Assam, India. It is a tributary of the Brahmaputra River, the fourth largest in the world. The Puthimari is known for its floods and high sediment load. Puthimari River flows through Rangia Sub-division, Hajo and Hajo Sub-division. The Baralia River, Suklai River, and Lokhaitora River is a tributary river of the Puthimari river.
