= Lokhaitora River =

River in India

- Location within Assam Location within India

Physical characteristics
- Source
  - coordinates: 26.8513258°N 91.706603°E
- Mouth
  - coordinates: 26.577156°N 91.667424°E

Basin features
- Progression: Lokhaitora, Puthimari River, Brahmaputra River

The Lokhaitora River rises in Bhutan and flows through Assam, India. A portion divides into the Baralia River. The Lokhaitora continues south in several channels until it joins with the Suklai River forming the Puthimari River.

In northern Assam it flows through the Bornadi Wildlife Sanctuary, where it is known as the Barnadi River.

Like many rivers rising in Bhutan, the Lokhaitora has become seasonal, with great floods during the rainy season, and dry for the rest of the year.
