= Bornadi Wildlife Sanctuary =

Wildlife sanctuary in Assam, India

- IUCN category IV (habitat/species management area)
- Location within Assam Location within India
- Interactive map of Bornadi Wildlife Sanctuary
- Location: Udalguri District and Baksa District, Assam, India
- Nearest city: Tangla
- Coordinates: 26°48′21″N 91°44′25″E
- Area: 26.22 km^{2} (10.12 sq mi)
- Established: 1980; 46 years ago
- Governing body: Department of Environment and Forests, Assam

Bornadi Wildlife Sanctuary is a 26.22 km^{2} (10.12 sq mi) wildlife sanctuary situated on the foothills of Himalayas bordering Bhutan in the north and in Udalguri district and Baksa District of Assam, India. This sanctuary was named after the river Bornadi which flows on its western border. It is 30 km (19 mi) from Tangla town and 130 km (81 mi) from Guwahati. The sanctuary was established in 1980 to protect the hispid hare (Caprolagus hispidus) and pigmy hog (Porcula salvania). It is home to many birds such as the white-capped redstart, the blue magpie, deer and leopard.

== Climate ==
The climate of the area is warm.

== Biodiversity ==
There are mammals such as the pygmy hog, golden langur, clouded leopard, hoolock gibbon and white-winged wood duck and some migratory and local birds like peafowl, hornbill, swamp partridge, Bengal florican, kingfisher, woodpecker, great cormorant, little cormorant, little green heron, night heron.

== See also ==
- Protected areas of Assam
