= WWF-India =

Indian wildlife conservation charity

World Wide Fund for Nature-India, better known by its abbreviation WWF-India, Established as a Charitable Trust in 1969, has an autonomous office, with the Secretariat based in New Delhi and various state, divisional and project offices spread across India.

WWF-India is one of India’s conservation organizations. .

== Programmes ==
WWF-India today is engaged in many activities for protection and conservation of the environment in the Indian context. Climate change and energy conservation are among the chief areas of concern. The Forest and Biodiversity Conservation Division strives to promote and enhance conservation of forest ecosystems through a participatory approach involving key stakeholders in India. Through its Environment Education Programme and Education for Sustainable Development, it aims at strengthening individual and institutional capacity in nature conservation and environmental protection through widespread education and awareness.

=== Education for Sustainable Development...... ===
WWF-India launched an Education for Sustainable Development program in June 2013, including a trainer kit with materials in six languages, English, Hindi, Assamese, Bengali, Kannada and Malayalam. The program was targeted at teacher training and educational bodies responsible for curriculum.

As a pilot program, the WWF-India had introduced the program several months earlier in thirteen model schools. One of the model schools, Salbari Higher Secondary School, was transformed by the program. Beyond cleaning up their school, the students set up a bird watching club, planted saplings with protective fencing, made a worm-compost pit, and started several other environmental projects.

As of January 2015, the programme was active in four states.

== Controversy ==
The Silence of the Pandas is a documentary on WWF-International, and also focuses on WWF-India and other WWF branches. A year in the making, this film from the award-winning German film maker Wilfried Huismann sought to dispel the green image of the WWF. Behind the WWF's eco-facade, the film uncovered explosive stories from all around the world.

There has also been a criticism of their tiger conservation projects.

== See also ==
- Bombay Natural History Society (BNHS)
- Indian natural history
- Protected areas of India
- Sanctuary Asia
- Wildlife Institute of India (WII)
- Wildlife of India
- Wildlife Trust of India (WTI)
- Zoo Outreach Organisation
