= Kalaigaon =

Kalaigaon Kālāigaon
- Legislative Assembly Constituency
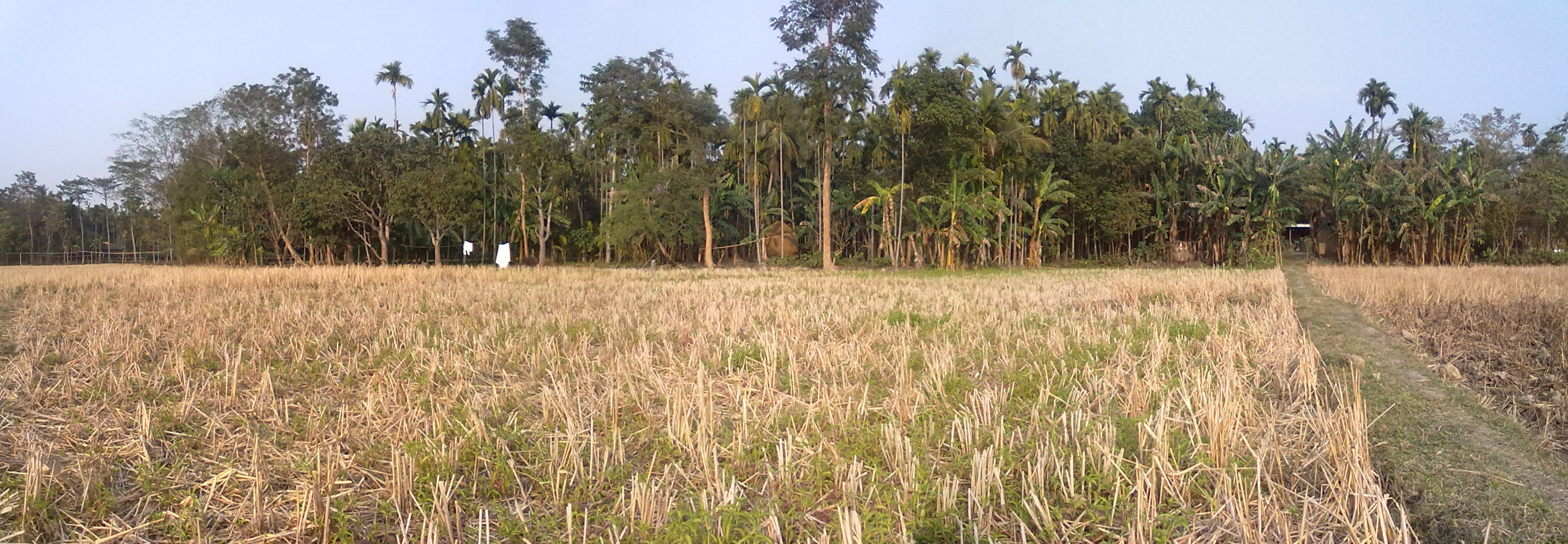
- A view of the rice fields and tree plantations in Kalaigaon

- Location in Assam, India Kalaigaon (India)
- Coordinates: 26.57459°N 91.97567°E
- Country: India
- State: Assam
- District: Udalguri

Government
  - Member Of Legislative Assembly: Sri Maheswar Baro (Bodoland People's Front)

Area
  - Total: 232 km^{2} (90 sq mi)
- Elevation: 37 m (121 ft)

Population (2011)
  - Total: 110,862
  - Density: 477/km^{2} (1,240/sq mi)

Languages
  - Official: Assamese
- Time zone: UTC+5:30 (IST)
- PIN: 784525
- Telephone code: 91 - (0) 3713 - XX XX XXX
- ISO 3166 code: IN-AS
- Vehicle registration: AS-13 & AS-27 (Mangaldai & Udalguri)

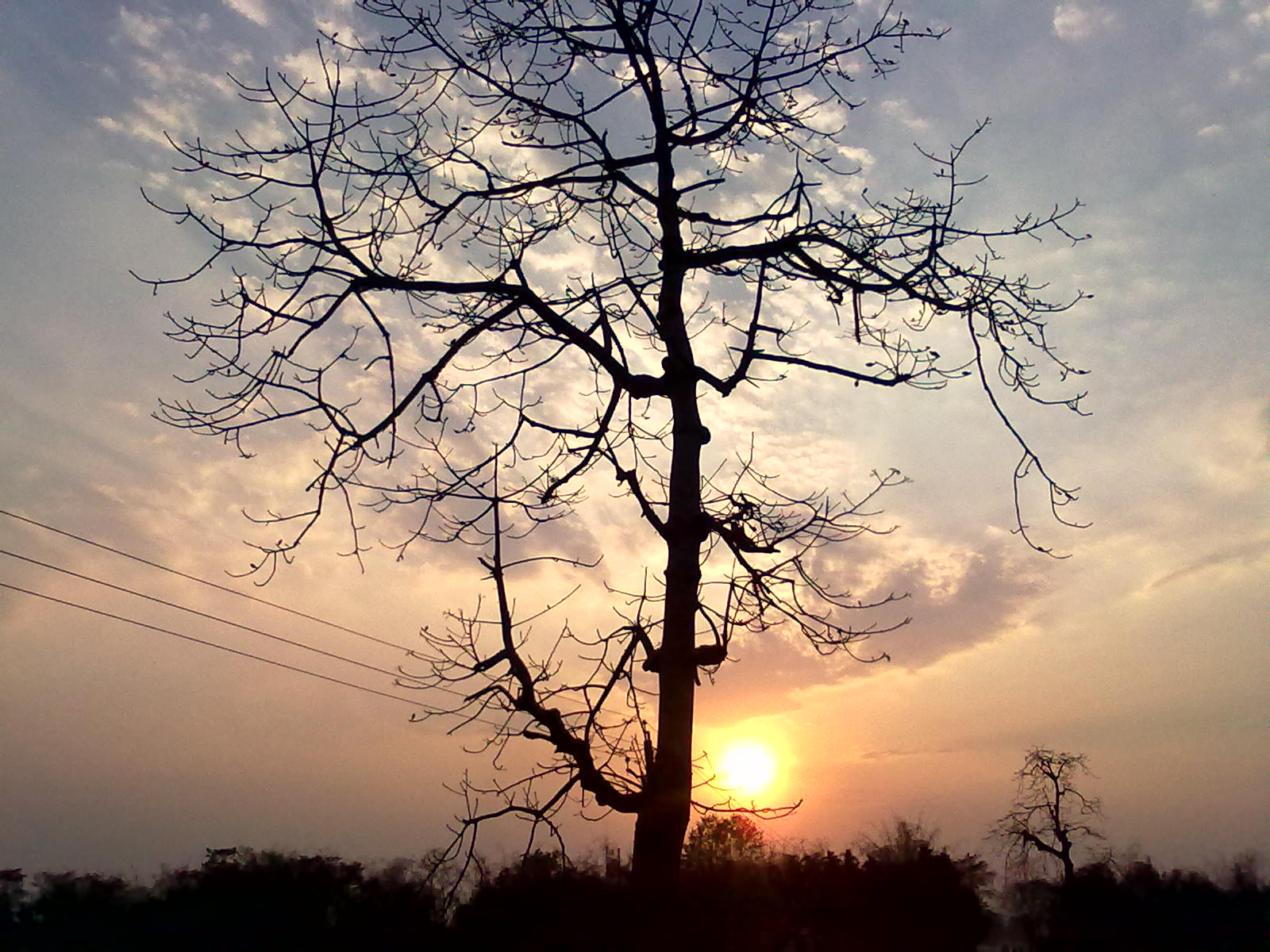
A beautiful view of Sunset in Kalaigaon

Kalaigaon is a town and Legislative Assembly Constituency in north-eastern India. It is situated in the Udalguri district of Assam state. The average altitude is 37 meters. The climate is humid and congenial, while the relative humidity is around 82%. The annual rainfall is around 2,000 mm.

== Etymology ==
The origin of name of this ancient place can be found in a local legend about a brahmin priest, named Kendukalai who was appointed the chief priest of the Kamakhya Temple. According to the legend, he was supposedly able to cause the goddess Kamakhya Devi appear in her mortal form in the temple and dance, because of his musical talents and devotion to her. The erstwhile Koch king Naranarayan, learning of this, wished to see the goddess. Kendukalai asked the king to hide near the temple and watch through a hole and began his worship. The goddess appeared and started dancing in the temple, but eventually saw the eyes of the King through the hole, and discovered his treachery. Some versions of the legends say that the goddess cursed the lineage of the king and the priest would be destroyed if they ever visited the temple, while others say the angered goddess turned the king into a stone and decapitated the priest. The head of the deceased priest got thrown away by the force of the mortal blow and landed in a place 13 km north, which was later named as Muradeor, which was his birthplace. The name of Kendukalai later degraded to Kalaigaon. Even today, Kendukalai village exists 8 km west, towards Tangla, from present day Kalaigaon, on M.B. Road.

== Demographics ==
According to 2011 census records, the total population of Kalaigaon sub-division was 110862, of whom 56285 (50.77%) were males and 54577 (49.22%) were females. Some villages of Kalaigaon fall in Darrang district, and the population there was 24246 (12723 males and 12523 females). The remaining majority of villages are in Udalguri district, and the population there was 85616 (43562 males and 42054 females).

== Economy ==
The economy of this place is heavily dependent on agriculture. Cultivation of rice is the primary agricultural activity, vegetables being a close second.

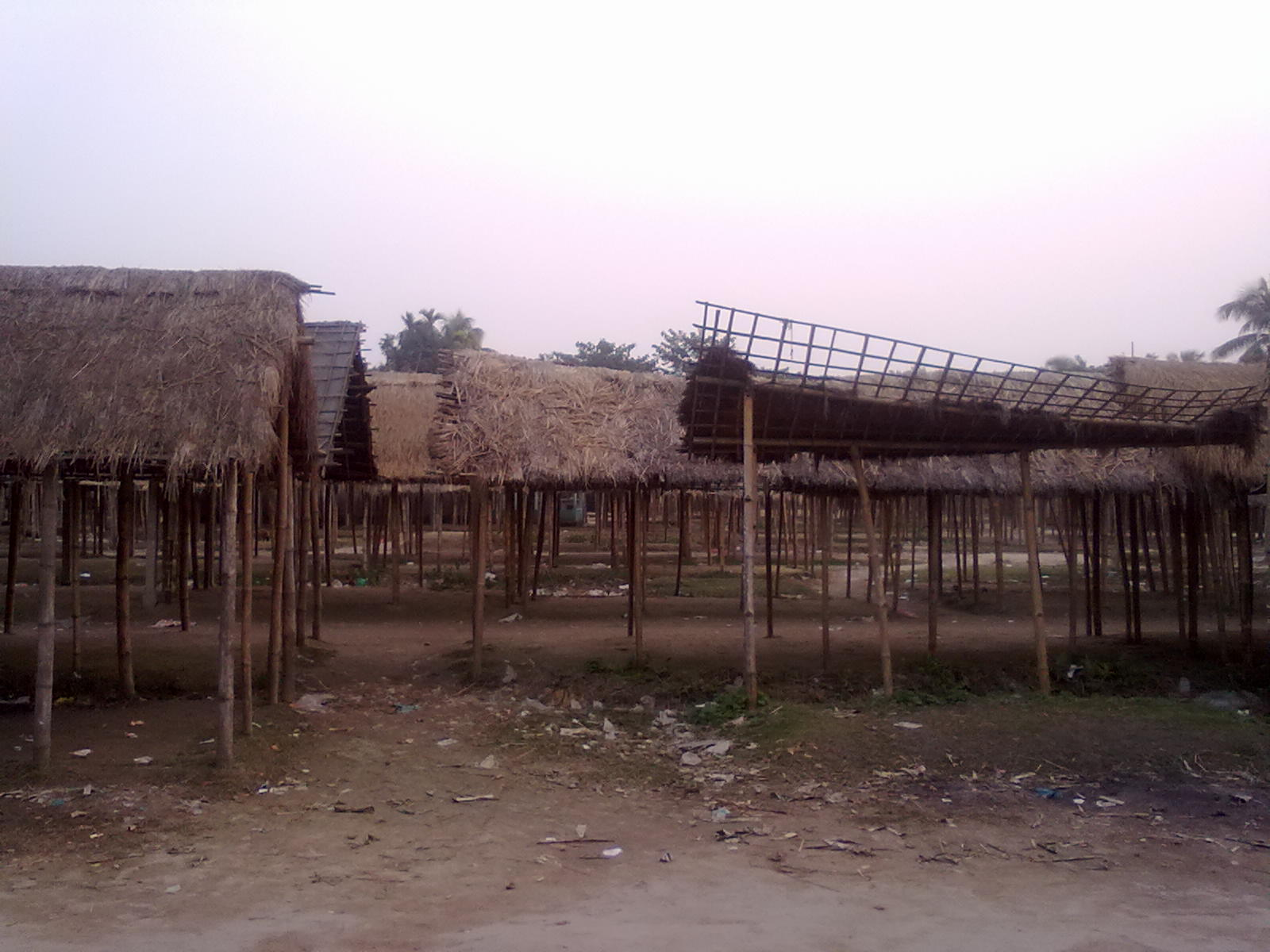
Roofed shelters of Sunday Market of Kalaigaon

However, over the last few years, consumerism has contributed to the steep rise in the consumer goods business. Due to heavy rice cultivation, many small indigenous rice mills came up in and around the town which supply rice to other parts of Assam; Guwahati being the largest consumer of its rice. The Kalaigaon rice brand has now set up its own identity in Assam. There are also a number of co-operative societies as well as banking institutes.

This place also has two weekly market days, one on Sundays and another on Thursdays. A unique feature being that livestock-trading takes place on Thursdays almost exclusively, which is rare in these parts of the world. This market is locally known as Goru Bojar, cattle market. These markets attract crowds to the district every Thursday and Sunday, often making transportation cumbersome in the town.

There are also a few tea gardens in and around this town. Before 1950, most were owned by British tea companies.

== Terrorism and Insurgency ==
Like other parts of Assam, there has been incidents of terrorism in Kalaigaon. There has been conflict between security agencies and terrorists in the region. However, in the recent years, the frequency of such incidents have greatly declined.
