= Rowta =

- Town
- Rowta Town
- Location within Assam Location within India
- Coordinates: 26°42′43″N 92°12′20″E
- Country: India
- State: Assam
- District: Udalguri(B.T.R)

Government
  - Body: Rowta Gaon panchayat
- Elevation: 84 m (276 ft)
- Demonym: Rowtian

Languages
  - Official: Bodo
- Time zone: UTC+5:30 (IST)
- PIN: Source: https://www.icbse.com
- Vehicle registration: AS-27 (Udalguri)
- Website: Udalguri District Official Website

Rowta Chariali is a town located in Udalguri district of Assam, one of the North Eastern States of India, South East Asia connected to NH-15. Rowta is located in Udalguri district under the jurisdiction of Bodoland Territorial Council which controls the Bodoland Territorial Region. Rowta is located along the bank of the River Dhansiri.

== Transportation ==
Rowta is connected with a railway station, Rowta Bagan, and approx distance is about 2.5 km to the north direction from Rowta Chariali. Rowta Bagan Railway Station is a station on Rangia-Murkongselek section under Rangia Railway Division of Northeast Frontier Railway Zone with services to important cities of the State like Guwahati, Tezpur, Rangapara, Biswanath Chariali, Dhemaji etc. Also bus services is served by the government owned Assam State Transport Corporation, Bodoland Transport Services and many private bus operators along Guwahati to Tezpur, Rowta to Kokrajhar via Tamulpur.
