= Mushalpur =

Coordinates: 26.6641°N 91.3407°E

- town
- Location in Assam, India Mushalpur (India)
- Country: India
- State: Assam
- District: Baksa-BTR-Bodoland Territorial Autonomous District
- Elevation: 52 m (171 ft)

Population (2011)
  - Total: 795

Languages
  - Official: Bodo, Assamese
- Time zone: UTC+5:30 (IST)
- PIN: 781372
- Telephone code: 03624 XXXXXX
- ISO 3166 code: IN-AS
- Vehicle registration: AS-28
- Website: baksa.gov.in

Mushalpur is a small town the headquarters of Baksa district in Assam state of India. It is located 6 km (3.7 mi) east of Charaimari. The place is mostly consists of shops and educational institutes.

== Demographics ==
Mushalpur has population of 795 of which 429 are males while 366 are females as per 2011 census of India. In Mushalpur population of children with age 0-6 is 69 which makes up 8.68% of total population of the town. Average Sex Ratio of Mushalpur is 853 which is lower than Assam state average of 958. Child Sex Ratio for the Mushalpur as per census is 1029, higher than Assam average of 962. In 2011, literacy rate of Mushalpur was 73.69% compared to 72.19% of Assam. In Mushalpur Male literacy stands at 82.53% while female literacy rate was 63.14%.
