= Barama College =

College in Assam

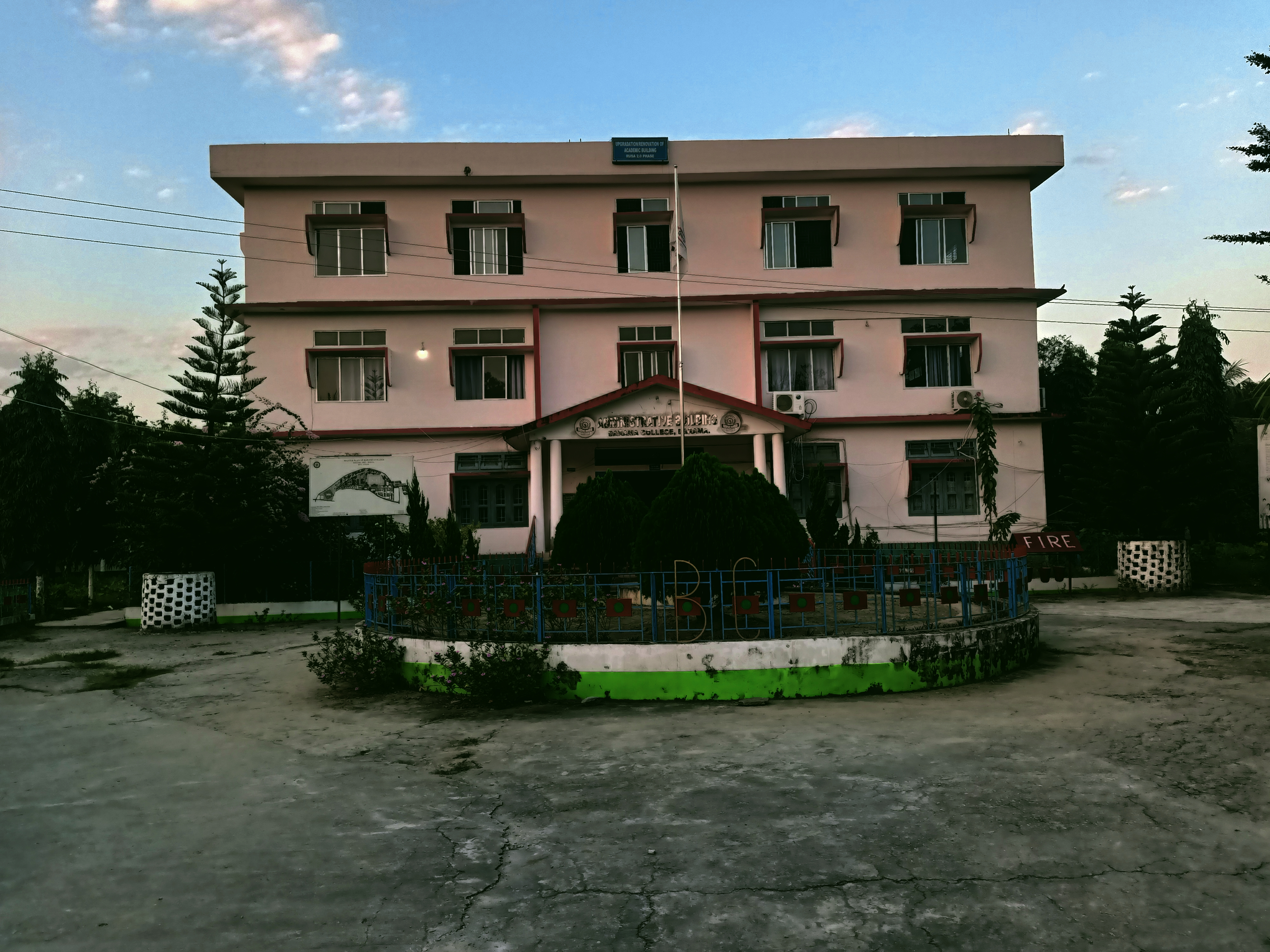
- Type: Higher secondary, Undergraduate college
- Established: 1971
- Affiliations: Bodoland University
- Principal: Dr. Nareswar Narzary
- Location: Barama, Assam, India; 26°31′40″N 91°22′04″E
- Website: www.baramacollegebarama.edu.in

- Location in Assam

Barama College is one of the oldest institutes for higher education at Barama in Baksa district of Assam. The college is affiliated to Bodoland University.

== Academic ==
Science

- HSSLC (Higher Secondary School Leaving Certificate) or (10+2)
- Bachelor of Science
1. B.Sc in Physics
2. B.Sc in Chemistry
3. B.Sc in Mathematics
4. B.Sc in Zoology
5. B.Sc in Botany

Arts

- HSSLC (Higher Secondary School Leaving Certificate) or (10+2)
- Bachelor of Arts
1. B.A. in Bodo
2. B.A. in Assamese
3. B.A. in English
4. B.A. in philosophy
5. B.A. in Economics
6. B.A. in history
7. B.A. in Political science
8. B.A. in philosophy
- Master of Arts Distance learning
1. M.A. in Assamese
2. M.A. in Bodo
3. M.A. in English
4. M.A. in History
5. M.A. in Economics
6. M.A. in philosophy
7. M.A./M.Sc in Mathematics
8. M. Com

The institute also offers Masters in communication and journalism (MCJ/PGDJMC), PG Diploma in Sales and Marketing Management (PGDSMM), PG Diploma in Business Management (PGDBM), PG Diploma in Finance Management (PGDFM), PG Diploma in Insurance and Risk Management PGDIM), PG Diploma in Banking and Finance Services (PGDBFS) and PG Diploma in Computer Application (PGDCA).

== Accreditation ==
In 2016 the college has been awarded 'B+' grade by National Assessment and Accreditation Council (NAAC). The college is also recognised by University Grants Commission (India).
