= Bhairabkunda Shiva Mandir =

- Location in Bhutan

Religion
- Affiliation: Hinduism
- District: Samdrup Jongkhar District
- Features: Temple tank: Bhairab Kunda

Location
- Location: Jomotsangkha (Daifam)
- Country: Bhutan
- Interactive map of Bhairabkunda Shiva Mandir
- Coordinates: 26.8933021°N 92.0910377°E

Bhairabkunda Shiva Mandir or Daifam Shiv Mandir is one of the most important Hindu temples in Bhutan. It is the only Shakta pitha in Bhutan. It is located in the south east corner of Bhutan near the town of Jomotsangkha (Daifam) and it shares border with the Indian states of Arunachal Pradesh to East and Assam to the South. It is located 24 km from the Indian town of Udalguri in Assam.

== History ==
According the Shiva Mahapurana and the Swasthani Brata Katha, after the death of his beloved Sati Devi or Dakshayani, Lord Shiva wandered the earth carrying her corpse on his shoulder. As he wandered, parts of her body fell to earth at different places on the Indian subcontinent. Each of the 51 (sometimes 108) places where her body parts fell, became sacred sites known as Shakta pitha, or seat of Shakti. One such Shakta pitha is identified by many as the Bhairab Kunda.

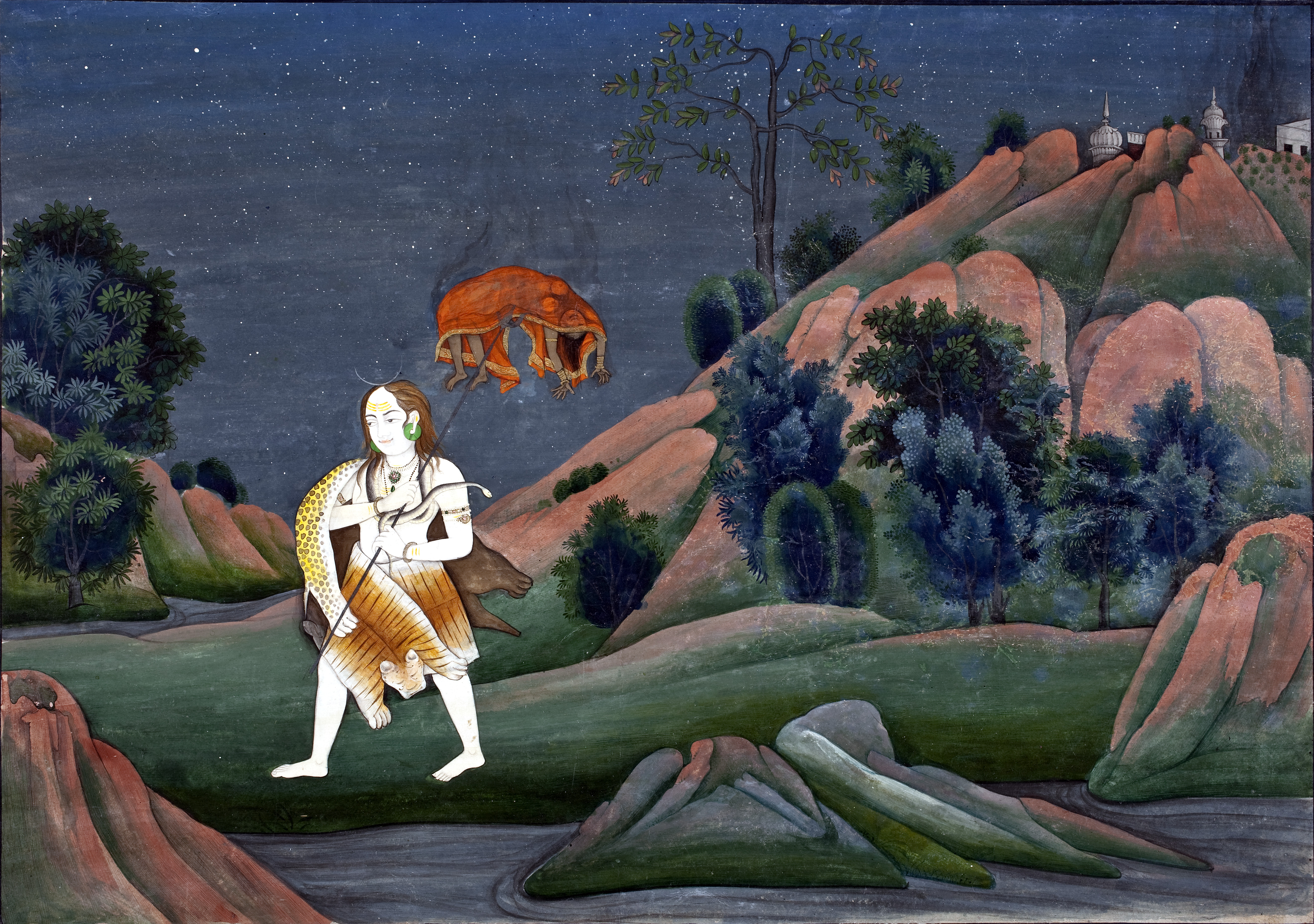
Lord Shiva carrying the corpse of Sati Devi

Later the King of the Gods, Lord Indra descended here on his celestial white elephant Airavata and blessed this place by meditating here for many years. After Indra carried out many fire rituals, Lord Shiva blessed the place with rain. Today it is said that whenever a fire ritual is conducted here, rain immediately falls in Bhairabkunda.

There is a cave located just below the present temple where it is said Lord Shiva meditated and a lake (Kunda) was formed near the site of his meditation. Years later, Bhairab Nath, a fierce manifestation of Lord Shiva was meditating at the same place he discovered a natural Shiva Ling and the place got its name Bhairabkunda (or "Bhairav Lake").

== Architecture ==
The Original Bhairab Kund lake burst during the 1950 Assam–Tibet earthquake leaving the Shiv Linga on the bed of the lake. The current lake is the remains of the original lake. The sacred relics were relocated to the present site where a wooden temple was built.

The Construction of the present temple began in 2002 by the contribution from the Bhutanese people and was completed by 2005. The Temple architecture combines the elements of Hindu temple and traditional Bhutanese architecture.

== Bhairab Kunda lake ==
The Bhairab Kunda lake itself lies at the tri-junction of the Bhutanese district of Samdrup Jongkhar and the Indian states of Assam and Arunachal Pradesh. Here the Jampani River, originating in Bhutan and the Bhairabi River merge in to form the Dhansiri River a major tributary of Brahmaputra.

== Bhairabkunda festival ==
The Bhairabkunda Festival occurs annually in the January month . It is a five-day festival organized by the Bhairabkunda Tourism festival organising committee. During Makar Sankranti, devotees visit the temple and take a holy bath in the kunda at the meeting point of the rivers and offer puja to Lord Shiva. The festival is attended by diverse ethnic and linguistic groups from Bhutan and neighbouring Indian states of Assam aal Arunachal Pradesh. The festival will also feature cultural exchange programs among Arunachal Pradesh, Bhutan, and Assam.
