= Tangla =

- Town
- Location within Assam Location within India
- Coordinates: 26.657086°N 91.912479°E
- State: Assam
- District: Udalguri(B.T.R)
- Established: 1962

Government
  - Type: Chairman-Chief Executive Officer
  - Body: Tangla Municipal Board

Area
  - Total: 9.10 km^{2} (3.51 sq mi)
- Elevation: 84 m (276 ft)

Population (2011)
  - Total: 18,228
  - Density: 2,000/km^{2} (5,190/sq mi)

Languages
  - Official: Assamese, Bodo
- Time zone: UTC+5:30 (IST)
- PIN: Tangla Post Office 784521. Purani Tangla Post Office 784528. Mechakapukhuri Branch Post Office 784521. Murmela Branch Post Office 784521. Palahgarh Branch Post Office 784521. Purandia Branch Post Office 784521. Source: https://www.icbse.com
- Telephone code: 03711
- Vehicle registration: AS-27 (Udalguri)
- Website: Udalguri District Official Website

Tangla is a small town located in Udalguri district in Assam state in India.

== Demographics ==
As of 2011, Tangla is divided into 4 wards, each with a nominated body. Tangla has a total population of 17,183, comprising 8,883 males and 8,300 females. The number of children aged 0-6 number at 1,593. The literacy rate of Tangla is 86.16%, higher than the state average of 72.19%; male literacy is 89.79% while female literacy is 82.28%.

=== Language ===
Languages spoken in Tangla (2011)
1. Bengali (47.9%)
2. Assamese (31.6%)
3. Hindi (11.8%)
4. Bodo (5.70%)
5. others (3.00%)

The 2011 census recorded Bengali as the most spoken language with 8,231 speakers, followed by Assamese at 5,431, Hindi was spoken by 2,030 people and Bodo 984.

== Climate ==
Climate data for Tangla (1971–2000, extremes 1954–2003)
Month	Jan	Feb	Mar	Apr	May	Jun	Jul	Aug	Sep	Oct	Nov	Dec	Year
Record high °C (°F)	31.7 (89.1)	32.5 (90.5)	38.0 (100.4)	37.9 (100.2)	38.9 (102.0)	39.6 (103.3)	38.7 (101.7)	40.1 (104.2)	38.8 (101.8)	37.0 (98.6)	33.4 (92.1)	32.1 (89.8)	40.1 (104.2)
Mean daily maximum °C (°F)	24.5 (76.1)	25.6 (78.1)	29.7 (85.5)	30.1 (86.2)	30.6 (87.1)	32.3 (90.1)	32.4 (90.3)	33.0 (91.4)	31.8 (89.2)	30.9 (87.6)	28.8 (83.8)	25.4 (77.7)	29.6 (85.3)
Mean daily minimum °C (°F)	10.9 (51.6)	12.7 (54.9)	15.9 (60.6)	20.1 (68.2)	22.4 (72.3)	24.8 (76.6)	25.6 (78.1)	25.5 (77.9)	24.6 (76.3)	21.2 (70.2)	16.1 (61.0)	11.3 (52.3)	19.4 (66.9)
Record low °C (°F)	3.6 (38.5)	5.3 (41.5)	8.4 (47.1)	10.8 (51.4)	10.1 (50.2)	17.4 (63.3)	20.1 (68.2)	20.3 (68.5)	19.0 (66.2)	11.3 (52.3)	9.2 (48.6)	5.2 (41.4)	3.6 (38.5)
Average rainfall mm (inches)	11.3 (0.44)	18.2 (0.72)	37.7 (1.48)	193.4 (7.61)	274.2 (10.80)	373.1 (14.69)	366.3 (14.42)	265.1 (10.44)	249.6 (9.83)	103.9 (4.09)	20.7 (0.81)	10.8 (0.43)	1,924.3 (75.76)
Average rainy days	0.9	1.8	3.1	9.5	10.7	12.3	14.6	11.2	10.2	4.9	1.2	0.7	80.8
Average relative humidity (%) (at 17:30 IST)	75	72	62	72	76	78	79	80	83	80	76	75	76
Source: India Meteorological Department

== Employment ==
6,229 people were engaged in work or business activity.

== Economy ==
There are a number of tea gardens located nearby and Tangla is the nearest commercial access point for them. Before 1950, most of them were owned by British tea companies.

== Governance ==
Tangla is a part of Mangaldai Lok Sabha Constituency. Biswajit Daimary is the present MLA from 64 No. Paneri LAC.

== Transportation ==
The town is well connected to the rest of the state by the Mangaldai-Bhutiachang (MB Road/State Highway 4), allowing access to the National Highway 52 at Mangaldai. Trains from Tangla railway station travel to Kamakhya, New Jalpaiguri, Dekargaon, Rangiya and Naharlagun. There are also buses going to the rest of the state.

== Educational Institutions ==
Tangla is an educational hub of lower Assam, delivering positions in HSLC and ASHEC.

Colleges
Name	Courses Available
Tangla College	NAAC B accredited college. It offers bachelor's degrees in Arts, Commerce & Science streams and BCA, diplomas in various computer fields. The college has also introduced MA, M.Sc (Maths), M.Com & PGDCA courses under Guwahati University IDOL with a regular (weekly) mode of classes.
Tangla Govt Higher Secondary	SEBA, AHSEC Arts
R.C. Saharia Teacher's Training College, Tangla,	Offers Bachelor of Education degree (B.ED.)
K.K Handique State Open University	Offers various Bachelor's courses
North Darrang College, Tangla,	Arts Junior College
National Pioneer College	Arts, Commerce & Science Junior College
Arunodoi Senior Secondary School	Science & Arts Junior College
Presidency Junior College	Junior College for Arts, Science and Commerce
NRDS Junior College, Tangla	Junior College for Arts
Don Bosco Higher Secondary School	Junior College for Arts
Excellence Academy	Junior College for Science
Royal Vision Integrated,	Coaching Institute

Schools
Name	Curriculum
Don Bosco School, Tangla	SEBA
Tangla Girls High School	SEBA
Tangla Model High School	SEBA
Auxilium Convent School, Tangla	SEBA
Arunodoi Academy	SEBA
Tangla English Medium High School	SEBA
Maharishi Vidya Mandir, Tangla	CBSE
National Pioneer Public School	SEBA
Jatiya Vidyapith	SEBA
Kendriya Jatiya Vidyapith	SEBA
Adharsha Vidyapith	SEBA
Sankardev Sishu Niketan, Tangla	SEBA
Gyanuday Jatiya Vidyapith	SEBA
Navadai Jatiya Vidyapith	SEBA

Alma Mater Silver Public School
Nilachal Public School
Pranabananda Vidya Mandir

== Healthcare ==
"Tangla CHC Kalaguru Bishnu Rabha Thirty Bedded Govt Hospital" is the nearest hospital of the town. A government run veterinary hospital is also located nearby.

== Notable people ==
1. Arupa Kalita Patangia
2. Pabitra Rabha
