= Salbari =

- town
- Location in Assam, India Salbari (India)
- Coordinates: 26°36′4.731″N 91°30′58.116″E
- Country: India
- State: Assam
- District: Baksa-BTAD-Bodoland Territorial Autonomous District

Languages
  - Official: Bodo, English,
- Time zone: UTC+5:30 (IST)
- PIN: 781318
- ISO 3166 code: IN-AS
- Vehicle registration: AS-28
- Website: baksa.gov.in

Salbari is one of the sub divisions of Baksa district in the state of Assam, India.

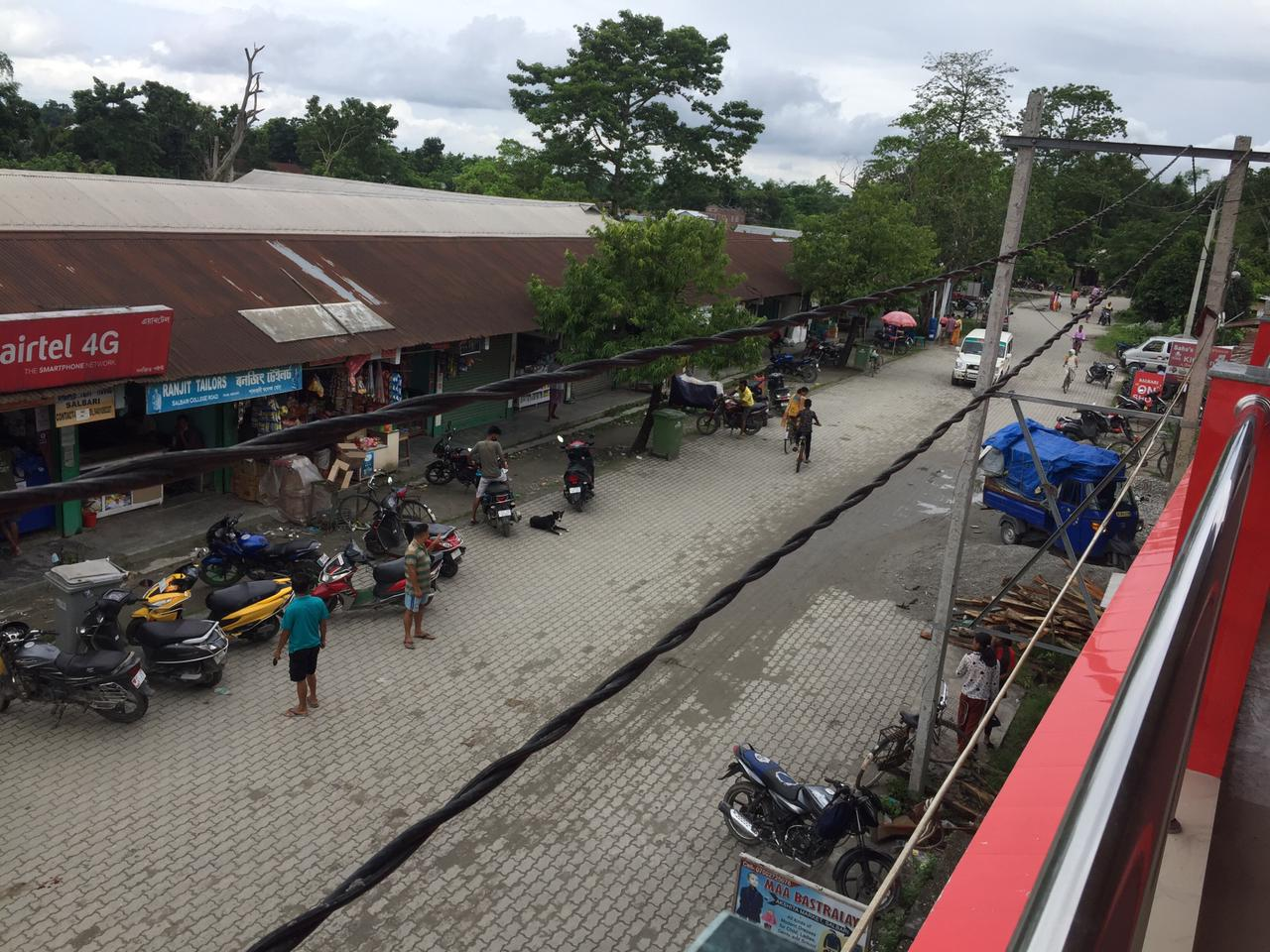
Salbari College Road

== Manas National Park ==
Manas National Park is approximately 10 km from Salbari.

== Educational institutions ==
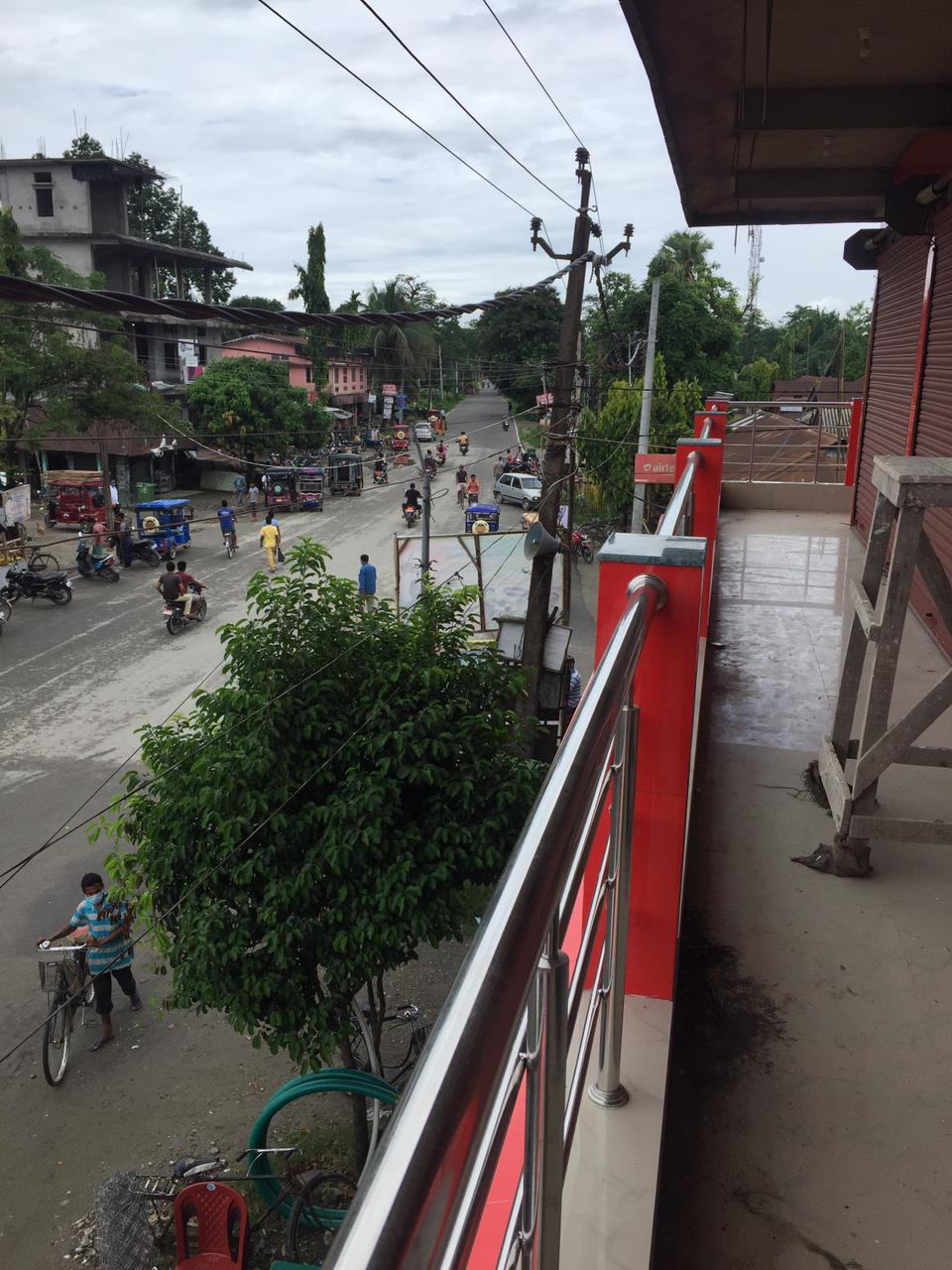
Salbari centre

- Salbari Higher Secondary School
- Salbari College
- Salbari Jr. College
- Salbari Girls Middle English & High school
- Sanjarang Bodo School, Salbari
- Greenland English School (private)
- Hathorkhi Foraisali
- Good Shepherd National School

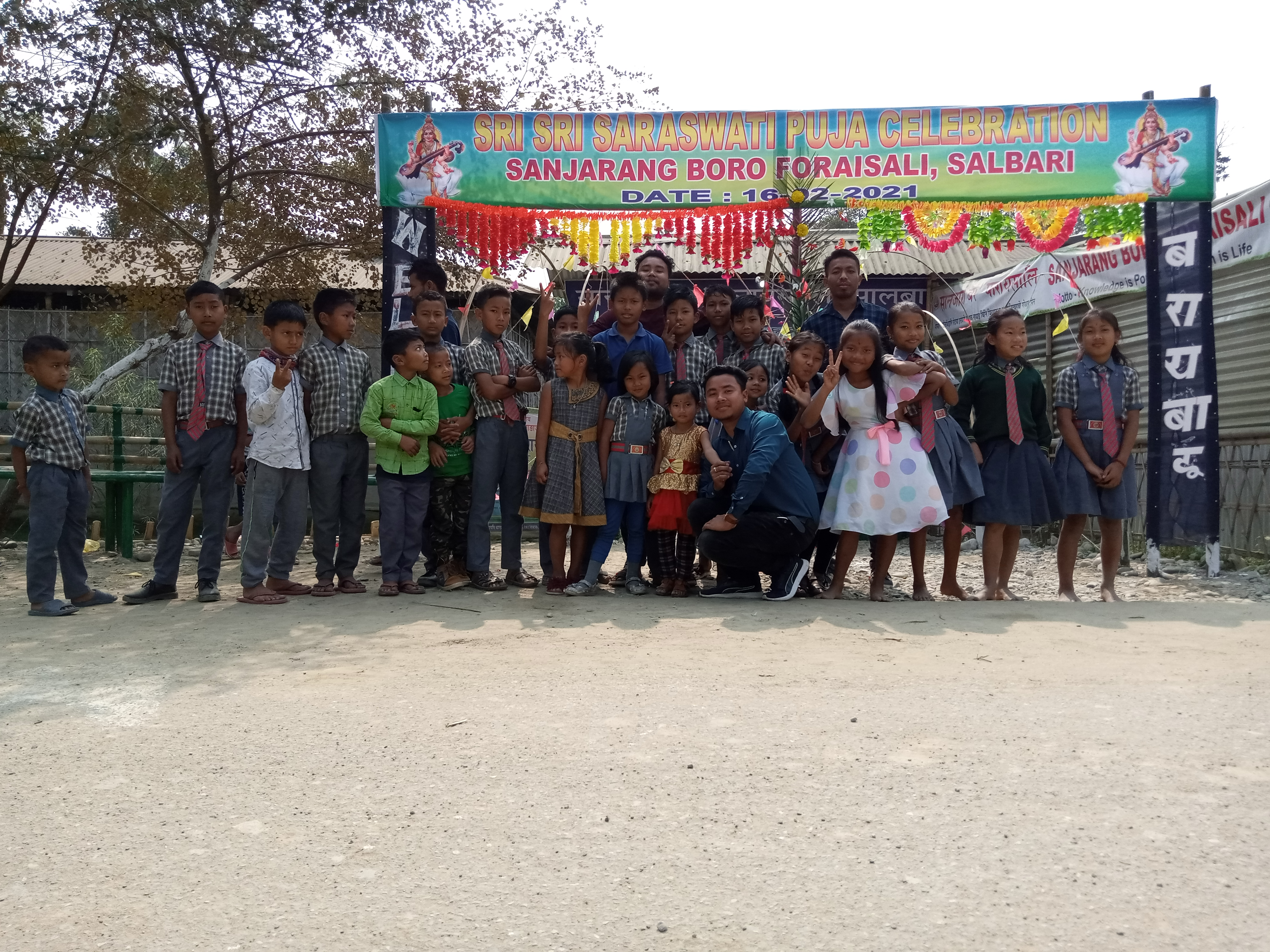
Sanjarang Bodo School, Salbari
