= Rangiya =

Rangiya Rangia
- City
- Rangia City
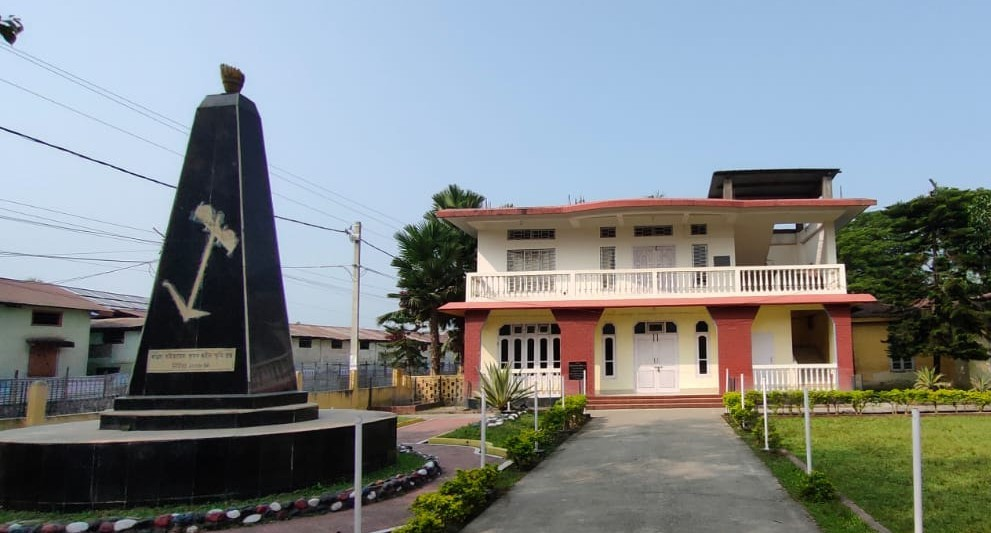
- Nicknames: City of Colors, Transportation Hub of Assam, Plantation Valley of Assam, Gateway of Indo-Bhutan Border
- Location in Assam, India Rangiya (India)
- Coordinates: 26.47°N 91.63°E
- Country: India
- State: Assam
- Region: Lower Assam
- District: Kamrup
- No. of Wards: 10
- District Office: Amingaon
- Villages under Rangiya Sub-District: Alagdia, Madhya Panduri, Athara Madhukuchi, Bala Gaon Arimatta, Balikuchi Padum Kowari, Bangaon Padum Kowari, Barhampur Hat Bajali, Jayontipur, Barkuriha Haradutta, Barlessakona, Madhukuchi, Barmurah, Batakuchi and 74 more...
- Founded by: Government of Assam
- Named after: Rangiya Municipality Board

Government
  - Type: Municipality
  - Body: Rangiya Municipality Board
  - Deputy Commissioner: Smti Keerthi Jalli, IAS
  - MLA: Bhabesh Kalita (BJP)

Area
  - Total: 9.6 km^{2} (3.7 sq mi)
  - Rank: 1st in Kamrup (R) District
- Elevation: 39 m (128 ft)

Population (2011)
  - Total: 26,389
  - Rank: 16th
  - Density: 2,700/km^{2} (7,100/sq mi)
  - Climate: Cwa
- Demonym: Rangian

Languages
  - Official: Assamese
  - Native: Kamrupi
- Time zone: UTC+5:30 (IST)
- PIN: 781354
- Telephone code: 03621
- ISO 3166 code: IN-AS
- Vehicle registration: AS 01 & AS 25
- Literacy: 71.4% (2011)
- Sex ratio: 1.17:1 (male:female) ♂/♀
- Summer temperature: 30°C - 39°C
- Winter temperature: 19°C - 29°C
- Website: rangiamb.org.in

Rangiya (Pron: ˈræŋˌgɪə) also known as Rangia, is a major town of Lower Assam division and a municipal board located in the Kamrup district of Assam, India. Rangiya is also the headquarters of Kamrup district, and Rangiya serves as the Sub-divisional headquarter of Rangiya Sub-division. One of Rangiya's significant features is its role as the divisional headquarter of the Northeast Frontier Railway, which is one of the major railway zones in India. Baralia river flows through the heart of the city. The Redhorn Division of the Indian Army is located just three kilometers from the city.

== Etymology ==
The word "Rangiya" is believed to have been derived from the local term "Randiya". According to local folklore, "Ran" means 'war' and "Diya" means 'to give', indicating that Rangiya was a place where a conflict or battle took place between the Boro people and Bhutanese communities.

== History ==
In Ancient times it was part of Ancient Kamrup, and subsequently included in Kamapitha division of Kamarupa Kingdom. In modern times, Rangiya is part of Kamrupi cultural region.

== Geography ==
Rangiya is located at 26.47°N 91.63°E. It has an average elevation of 39 metres (128 feet). Rangiya covers of area 9.6 square kilometres. The river Baralia flows through the heart of the city.

== Climate ==
Climate data for Rangiya (1991-2020)
Month	Jan	Feb	Mar	Apr	May	Jun	Jul	Aug	Sep	Oct	Nov	Dec	Year
Record high °C (°F)	35.7 (96.3)	32.3 (90.1)	36.5 (97.7)	38.4 (101.1)	39.5 (103.1)	38.8 (101.8)	39.4 (102.9)	38.6 (101.5)	39.0 (102.2)	37.8 (100.0)	34.5 (94.1)	33.4 (92.1)	39.5 (103.1)
Mean daily maximum °C (°F)	21.9 (71.4)	25.1 (77.2)	28.0 (82.4)	29.0 (84.2)	30.6 (87.1)	31.4 (88.5)	31.9 (89.4)	31.6 (88.9)	31.5 (88.7)	30.3 (86.5)	26.9 (80.4)	23.9 (75.0)	28.4 (83.1)
Mean daily minimum °C (°F)	12.8 (55.0)	14.5 (58.1)	18.9 (66.0)	21.4 (70.5)	23.4 (74.1)	25.1 (77.2)	25.8 (78.4)	26.2 (79.2)	25.8 (78.4)	23.2 (73.8)	19.0 (66.2)	15.4 (59.7)	20.9 (69.6)
Record low °C (°F)	5.3 (41.5)	6.2 (43.2)	8.0 (46.4)	12.1 (53.8)	16.0 (60.8)	18.0 (64.4)	20.5 (68.9)	20.5 (68.9)	19.9 (67.8)	13.2 (55.8)	10.1 (50.2)	7.3 (45.1)	5.3 (41.5)
Average rainfall mm (inches)	7.5 (0.30)	21.6 (0.85)	67.1 (2.64)	242.6 (9.55)	311.6 (12.27)	336.2 (13.24)	274.9 (10.82)	219.2 (8.63)	162.1 (6.38)	102.0 (4.02)	7.7 (0.30)	4.5 (0.18)	1,757.1 (69.18)
Average rainy days	0.8	1.5	4.5	12.3	14.1	13.2	12.0	10.2	8.7	4.7	0.8	0.6	83.5
Average relative humidity (%)	79	70	66	74	80	83	83	84	81	79	74	77	77
Source: India Meteorological Department

== Politics ==
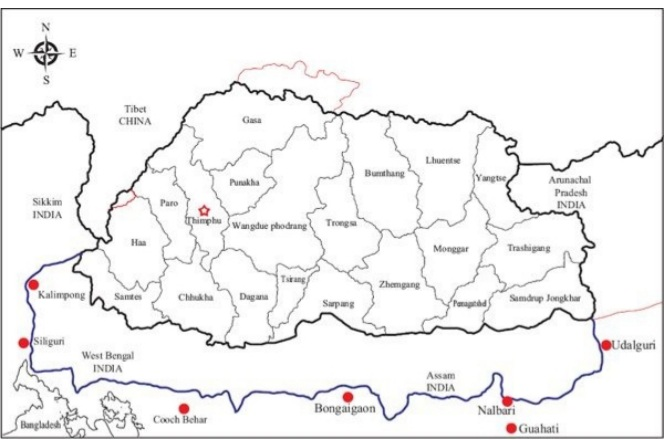
Rangiya at times acted as the Southern Boundary of Bhutan before the 1865 Duar War

Assam has 126 assembly constituencies, and Rangiya Assembly constituency is one of these where voters elect their representative. Bhabesh Kalita is the MLA of Rangiya Assembly constituency. It also falls under the Mangaldoi Lok Sabha constituency, which elects members to the national-level Lok Sabha.

Rangiya served as the Southern Boundary of Bhutan before the 1895 Duar War.

== Demographics ==
As of 2011 India census, Rangiya had a population of 26,389. Males constitute 54% of the population and females 46%. Rangiya has an average literacy rate of 73%, higher than the national average of 59.5%: male literacy is 78%, and female literacy is 67%. In Rangiya, 12% of the population is under six years of age.

== Healthcare system ==
There are several private hospitals in Rangiya apart from 2 government hospitals. Some of them are Swasti Hospital (Estd. 2018), Rangia Poly Clinic & Nursing Home, Sparsh Hospital (Estd. 2016).

== Transport ==
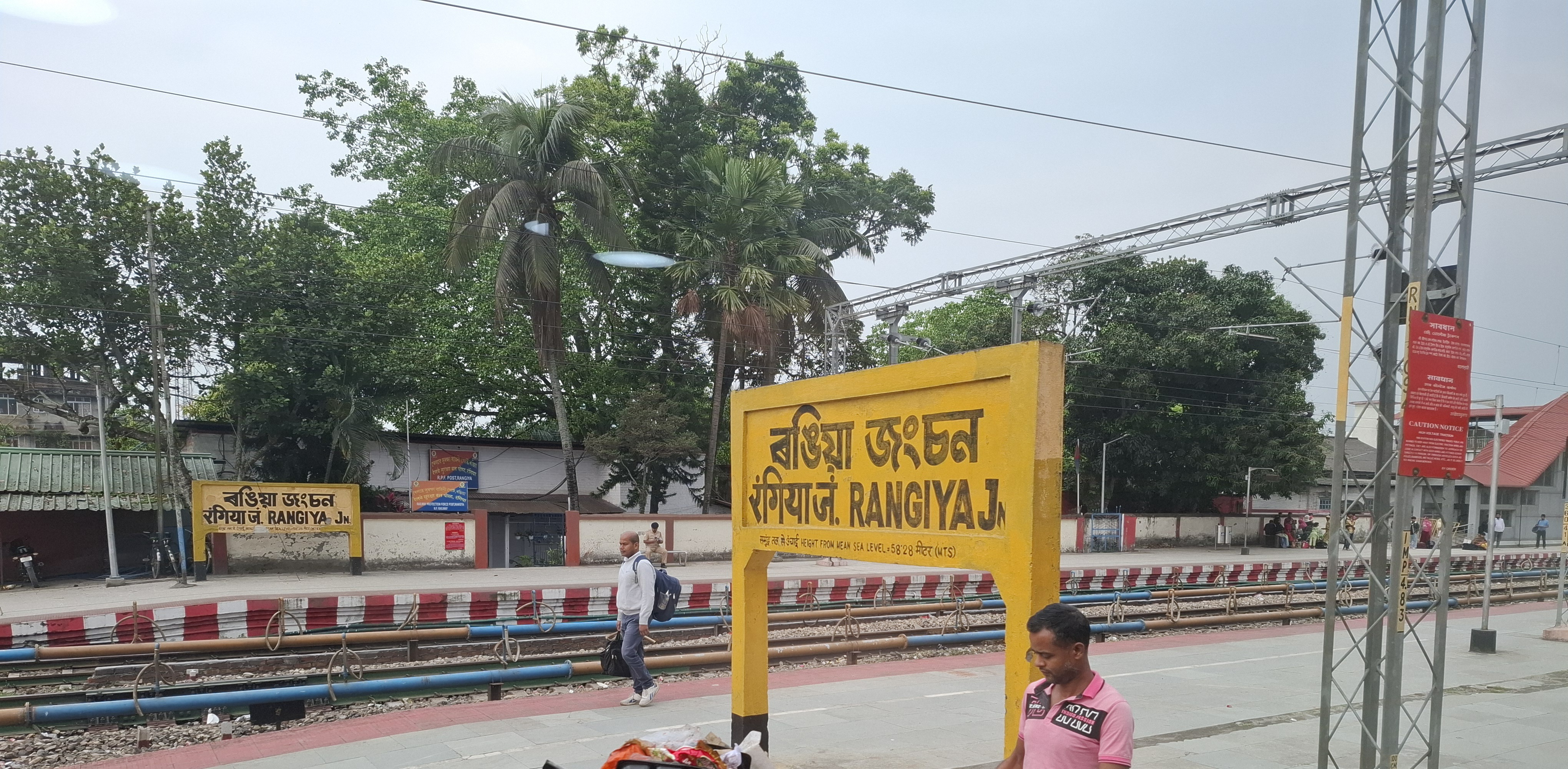
Rangiya Junction railway station

National Highway 27 runs through the heart of the city. Rangiya is important transit point in the region, nearly all trains halts at Rangiya Junction railway station. It is a junction of the New Bongaigaon–Guwahati section of Barauni–Guwahati line. Rangiya Junction is the 4th largest railway station in North-east India. It is one of the divisional headquarters of Northeast Frontier Railway. The Rangiya–Murkongselek line connects the state to Arunachal Pradesh.

== Notable people ==
- Himanta Biswa Sarma, Chief Minister of Assam
- Bhabesh Kalita, President of Bharatiya Janata Party, Assam and MLA of Rangiya Assembly constituency
- Rana Pratap Kalita, former general officer in the Indian Army Born in Rangiya, Assam

== See also ==
- Assam State Museum
- Brahmaputra Valley Film Festival
- History of Beltola
- List of colleges affiliated to Gauhati University
- Saraighat Bridge
- Varman dynasty
