= Udalguri district =

Coordinates: 26°44′42.72″N 92°05′46.32″E

- District of Assam
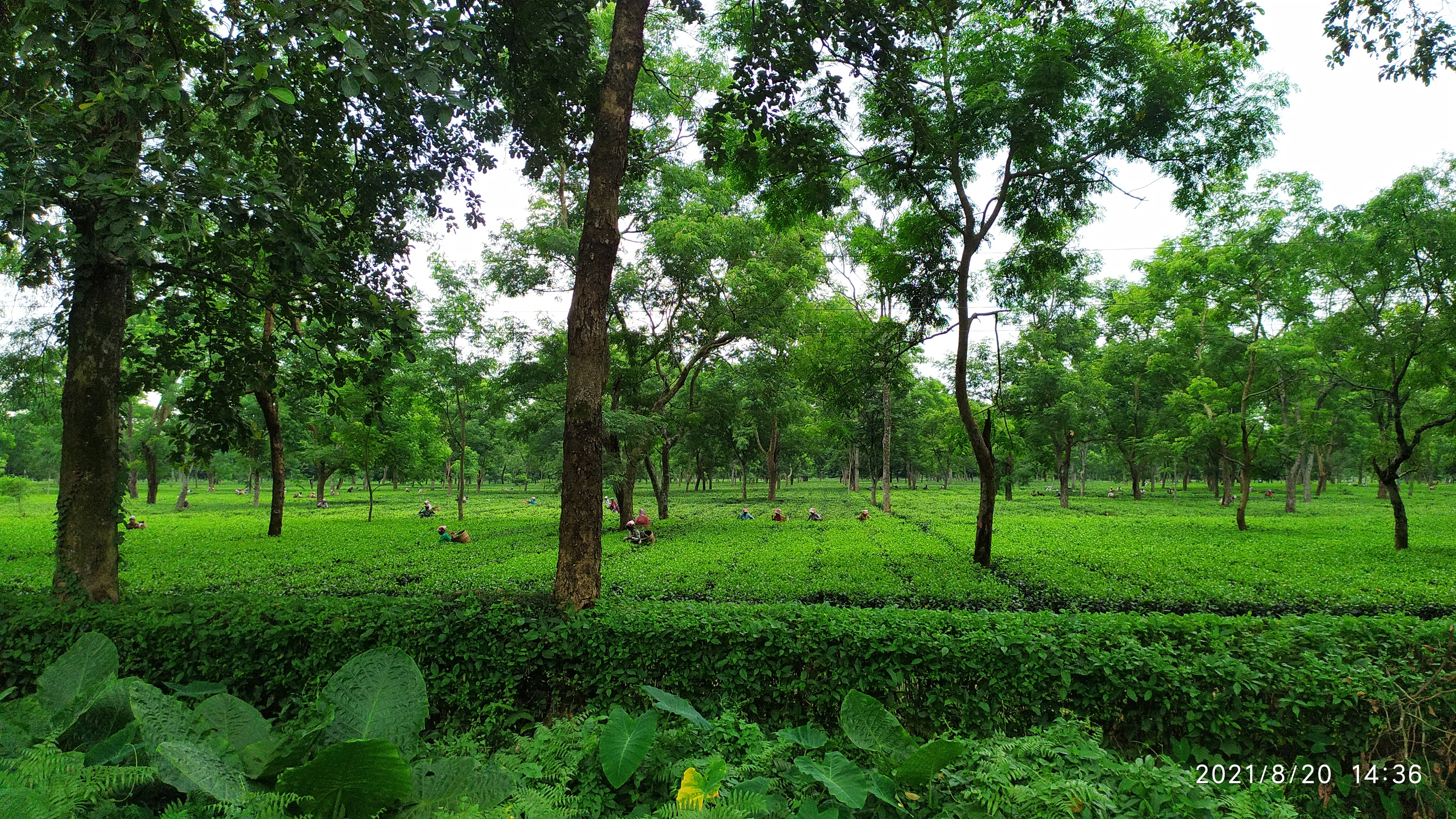
- Paneri Tea Garden

- Location in Assam
- Udalguri district
- Country: India
- State: Assam
- Territorial Region: Bodoland
- Headquarters: Udalguri

Government
  - Lok Sabha constituencies: Darrang-Udalguri
  - Vidhan Sabha constituencies: Bhergaon, Udalguri, Majbat, Tangla

Area
  - Total: 1,852.16 km^{2} (715.12 sq mi)

Population (2011)
  - Total: 831,668
  - Density: 449.026/km^{2} (1,162.97/sq mi)
- Time zone: UTC+05:30 (IST)
- PIN: 784509
- Telephone code: 03711
- ISO 3166 code: IN-AS
- Vehicle registration: AS-27
- Website: udalguri.assam.gov.in

Udalguri district (/ˌʊdʌlˈɡʊəri/), also known as Odalguri, is a district in the Bodoland Territorial Region of the state of Assam in Northeastern India. Udalguri town is the headquarters of the district.

== Etymology ==
The name Udalguri denotes a place surrounding the Udal tree (Udal, meaning a tree and Guri meaning surrounding area). Some authors are of the opinion that the name of the place became Udalguri as there was a hermitage of a sage named Uddalak Muni. Yet, another source mentions that the word has origins in the Boro language. From the Bodo words ordla and gundri, the name became Ordlagundri > Ordlagundi > Odalguri > Ugalguri. Bodo people still pronounce the name as Odalguri. In the Bodo language, ordla means wide and spacious, and gundri means powdered object.

== History ==
=== Duars ===
Udalguri district falls under Darrang Duars which includes the region between the Bornadi River and Dhansiri River. The Duar that falls under the Udalguri district are the Buriguma Dooar and Killing Dooars.

=== Trade relation with Tibet ===
In older times, Udalguri acted as a trading point between Assam and Tsona city in Tibet (now China). The route passed through the Nyamjang Chu and Tawang Chu rivers via Trashigang and Dewangiri. The Monpas of Tibet would visit Tangla and Udalguri to acquire silk known as Alaine from the Bodos and Ravas. and also to weave their dyed silk in the villages, the final product was later sold in Monpa villages in present Arunachal Pradesh and Tibet.

=== Darrang Raja and under the Kingdom of Bhutan ===
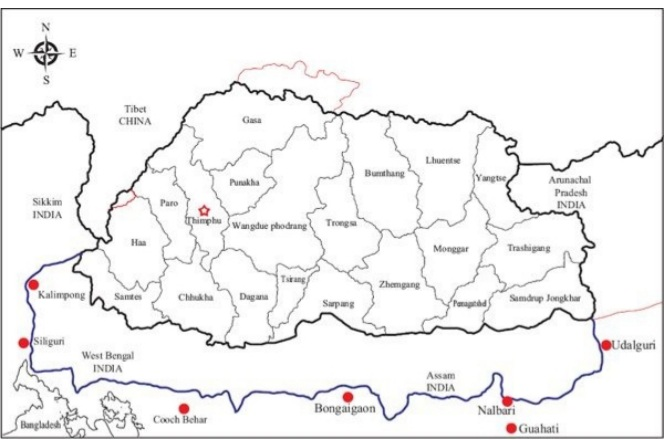
Southern Boundary of Bhutan contained the present Udalguri district before the 1865 Duar War

Under the Darrang Raja, an officer named Guntia Baruah was appointed to manage the transaction with the Bhutias who handed it over to the Borphukan at Guwahati, the Bhutias appointed Dzongpon to do the same.

According to Bhutanese chronicles, the region till the east in Killing Duars fell under the authority of the Bhutias in 1189.

From the early 17th-century present-day Udalguri district was governed jointly by the Druk Desi (Dzongkha: འབྲུག་སྡེ་སྲིད་) of Bhutan and the Sutamla of the Ahom kingdom. Under the Bhutan government, it was under the authority of Tongso Penlop who appointed Subah who in turn appointed Laskar, Mondol or Uzir to look after the activities of the Duars.

In 1841, the British East company removed the Bhutanese influence and the area was later merged to undivided Darrang district of Assam of the Indian Union in 1949.

=== Present ===
This district was formed on 14 June 2004 as one of the four districts under the Bodoland Territorial Council. This district was carved out by bifurcating Darrang district. The territory of the present district was earlier Udalguri sub-division of the undivided district.

Late Jojaram Sharma was one of the prominent India freedom fighters from Assam lived here.

== Tourism ==
Other than the multitude of culture and tradition of the various ethnic communities, the district has several tourist places. Some of the important ones are,

1. Part of Orang National Park
2. Bathou temple and Research centre in Odalguri District (All Bathou Mahasabha)
3. Old Namghar (Assamese Worship Place) in Udalguri Town
4. Tea gardens at Kachubil
5. Old Hanuman temple in Udalguri Town
6. Old Baptist Christian church in Udalguri Town
7. Bhairabkunda Picnic Spot
8. Gethsemane Man-made Forest (Bhairabkunda)

== Demographics ==
Historical population
Year	Pop.	±%
1901	72,515	—
1911	72,634	+0.2%
1921	81,624	+12.4%
1931	102,727	+25.9%
1941	138,593	+34.9%
1951	172,046	+24.1%
1961	278,788	+62.0%
1971	439,022	+57.5%
1991	692,919	+57.8%
2001	758,746	+9.5%
2011	831,668	+9.6%
Source: Census of India

According to the 2011 census Udalguri district's population is 831,668, an increase of 9.8% over 2001. The literacy rate is 66.6% and the gender ratio is 966. There are 449 inhabitants per square kilometre (1,160/sq mi). 4.52% of the population lives in urban areas. Scheduled Castes and Scheduled Tribes make up 4.55% and 32.15% of the population respectively.

The district is multi-ethnic and multi-religious in nature. Bodos forms the largest ethnic group in the district with 31.76% of the district's population. Other ethnic groups with significant population are Adivasi community with almost 23.12% and Bengali Muslims with 12% of the district's population. Assamese and Bengali Hindus resides mainly in urban areas. There is also a presence of sizeable Nepali speaking Gorkha community with estimated 5% of the district's population thinly scattered across the Udalguri district.

=== Religion ===
Religions in Udalguri district (2011)
Religion	Percent
Hinduism	73.64%
Christianity	13.25%
Islam	12.66%
Other or not stated	0.45%

Followers of Bathouism are counted under Hindus , no government data gives their exact number. Hindus are the largest group in the district, making up 612,425 which is 73.64% of the population. There are also 110,215 Christians (13.25%) and 108,319 Muslims (12.66%) in the district.

=== Languages ===
Languages of Udalguri district (2011)
1. Boro (26.9%)
2. Assamese (22.6%)
3. Bengali (19.4%)
4. Sadri (7.88%)
5. Nepali (5.60%)
6. Santali (2.79%)
7. Odia (2.64%)
8. Kurukh (2.08%)
9. Hindi (1.66%)
10. Mundari (1.57%)
11. Bhojpuri (1.45%)
12. Others (5.38%)

According to the 2011 census, 26.90% of the population speaks Boro, 22.62% Assamese, 19.43% Bengali, 7.88% Sadri, 5.60% Nepali, 2.79% Santali, 2.64% Odia, 2.08% Kurukh, 1.66% Hindi, 1.57% Mundari and 1.45% Bhojpuri as their first language.

== Geography ==
This district is bounded by Bhutan and West Kameng district of Arunachal Pradesh state in the north, Sonitpur district in the east, Darrang district in the south and Tamulpur district in the west. Area of the district is 1852.16 km^{2}.

=== Major Towns ===
Odalguri is the largest town in Udalguri district. Other towns include Tangla, Rowta, Mazbat, Kalaigaon, Paneri, Khairabari and Bhergaon.

=== Wildlife Sanctuary ===
- Bornadi Wildlife Sanctuary (Part)

=== Flora and fauna ===
In 1990, Udalguri district became home to Bornadi Wildlife Sanctuary, which has an area of 26.22 km^{2} (10.1 mi^{2}). It shares the park with four other districts.

Animals like elephants, Hog Deer, Tiger, Wild Boar, Civet, etc. are found. Birds like Bengal Florican, Black-necked Stork, Greater Adjudant Stork, Pallas's Fishing Eagle and Reptiles such as King Cobra, Python, Paradise Flying Snake, Lessemys Punctate, etc. can also be found.

== Climate ==
Climate data for Tangla (1991–2020)
Month	Jan	Feb	Mar	Apr	May	Jun	Jul	Aug	Sep	Oct	Nov	Dec	Year
Record high °C (°F)	31.7 (89.1)	32.5 (90.5)	38.0 (100.4)	38.2 (100.8)	38.9 (102.0)	39.6 (103.3)	38.1 (100.6)	39.0 (102.2)	38.8 (101.8)	37.0 (98.6)	33.4 (92.1)	32.1 (89.8)	39.6 (103.3)
Mean daily maximum °C (°F)	20.9 (69.6)	23.3 (73.9)	25.4 (77.7)	28.6 (83.5)	29.0 (84.2)	30.2 (86.4)	30.5 (86.9)	31.0 (87.8)	29.8 (85.6)	28.6 (83.5)	26.9 (80.4)	22.7 (72.9)	27.5 (81.5)
Mean daily minimum °C (°F)	11.2 (52.2)	12.4 (54.3)	15.2 (59.4)	19.0 (66.2)	20.9 (69.6)	23.5 (74.3)	24.8 (76.6)	25.0 (77.0)	24.0 (75.2)	21.8 (71.2)	18.5 (65.3)	12.9 (55.2)	19.4 (66.9)
Record low °C (°F)	3.6 (38.5)	5.3 (41.5)	8.4 (47.1)	10.8 (51.4)	15.7 (60.3)	17.4 (63.3)	20.0 (68.0)	20.3 (68.5)	19.0 (66.2)	11.3 (52.3)	9.2 (48.6)	5.2 (41.4)	3.6 (38.5)
Average rainfall mm (inches)	8.1 (0.32)	16.2 (0.64)	48.3 (1.90)	267.4 (10.53)	251.1 (9.89)	335.3 (13.20)	326.6 (12.86)	247.9 (9.76)	187.6 (7.39)	116.7 (4.59)	14.2 (0.56)	5.6 (0.22)	1,825 (71.85)
Average rainy days	1.0	1.6	3.8	13.6	11.5	15.2	14.1	10.3	9.6	5.2	1.0	0.5	87.4
Source: India Meteorological Department

== Administration ==
=== Divisions ===
The district has two sub-divisions: Udalguri and Bhergaon. These two sub-divisions are further divided into 5 revenue circles: Udalguri, Majbat, Harisinga, Kalaigaon, Khoirabari.

Three Vidhan Sabha constituencies of this district are Paneri, Majbat, and Udalguri. All of these are part of Mangaldoi Lok Sabha constituency.

Apart from these three Legislative Assembly constituencies, majority of the villages under Kalaigaon Legislative Assembly Constituency and a few villages fall under the Borsola Legislative Assembly Constituency fall in Udalguri District. While Kalaigaon LAC is a part of Mangaldai Lok Sabha Constituency and Borsola LAC is a part of Tezpur Lok Sabha Constituency.

Dhansiri Irrigation Project, the largest irrigation project in the region is situated in Udalguri.
