= Baksa district =

- District
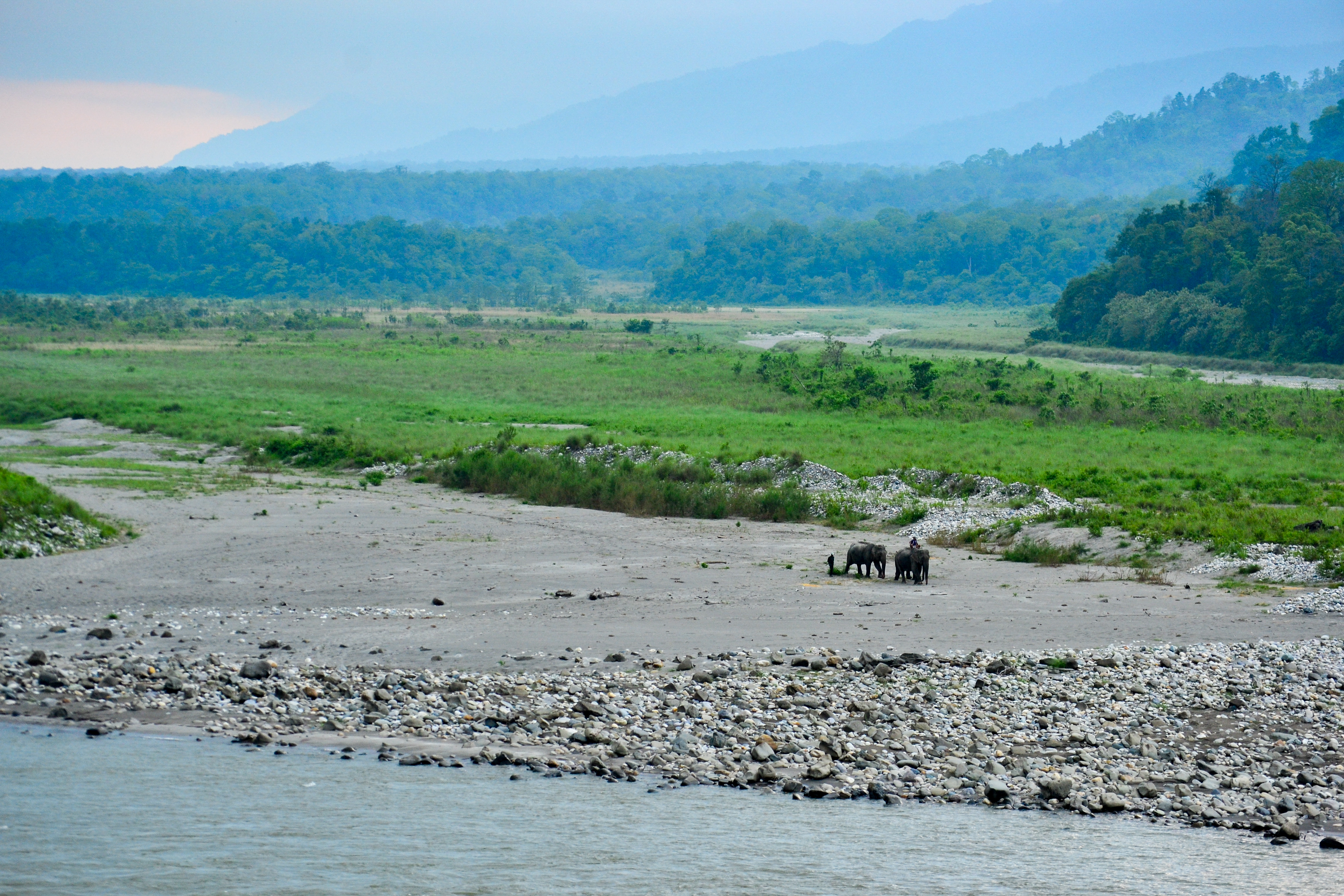
- View of Bhutan Himalayas from Manas National Park
- Interactive map of Baksa district
- Coordinates: 26°34′51″N 91°25′13″E
- Country: India
- State: Assam
- Territorial Region: Bodoland
- Headquarters: Mushalpur

Government
  - Lok Sabha constituencies: Kokrajhar
  - Vidhan Sabha constituencies: Tamulpur, Barama, Chapaguri

Area
  - Total: 1,573 km^{2} (607 sq mi)

Population (2011)
  - Total: 560,925
  - Density: 356.6/km^{2} (923.6/sq mi)
- Time zone: UTC+5:30 (Indian Standard Time)
- Website: baksa.assam.gov.in

Baksa district (/ˈbʌksə/ or /ˈbæksə/) is an administrative district in the Bodoland Territorial Region of Assam, one of the North-Eastern states of India. The administrative headquarters is at Mushalpur. Manas National Park is a part of this district.

== Etymology ==
The origin of the name "Baksa" is a topic of debate and speculation. One popular theory suggests that it is a misspelling of the Dzonkha word "Bangsa," which means a farmhouse and corridor. This is because the Bhutanese king and his subjects used this area for trade and passage to the plains. Historically, this region was known as Banska Dooar by the Bhutias.

According to a Bodo source, the name "Baksa" originated from a type of rice grain known as "Bagsa." This rice grain is a kind of broken and uncleaned product that is obtained after milling rice.

== History ==
=== Duars ===
Baksa district falls under Kamrup Duars which includes the region between the Manas River and the Barnadi River. The two Dooars under Baksa district are Banska Dooar and Kamrup Bijni Dooar.

=== Under the Kingdom of Bhutan ===
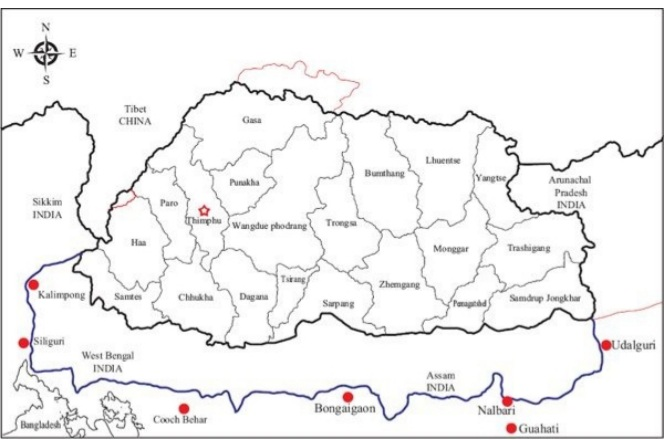
Southern Boundary of Bhutan contained the present Baksa district before the 1865 Duar War

During the mid-17th century, the Bhutan kingdom took advantage of the political instability caused by the Ahom-Mughal conflict and seized control of these Dooars, south of their hills up to the Gohain Kamal Ali. In the mid-19th century, the British East India Company eliminated Bhutanese influence from these Dooars and annexed Banska Dooar and Kamrup Bijni Dooar, in addition to other Kamrup and Darrang Duars.

=== Present ===
Baksa was notified as one of the districts of Bodoland Territorial Council in October 2003 while it started functioning from 1 June 2004 when naturalist-bureaucrat Dr Anwaruddin Choudhury of the Assam Civil Service took charge as its founding Deputy Commissioner. It started working from PWD Inspection Bungalow of Barama beside the NH 31 until it was shifted to Mushalpur in late 2010. It was created from parts of Barpeta, Nalbari and Kamrup districts. On 23 January 2022, Tamulpur district was created by separating Tamulpur sub-division of Baksa district.

== Geography ==
This district is bounded by Bhutan in the north, Udalguri district in the east, Barpeta, Nalbari and Kamrup districts in the south and Chirang district in the west. Area of the district is 2,400 km^{2} (930 sq mi).

=== National protected area ===
- Manas National Park (Part)

== Administration ==
Mushalpur town is the headquarters of the district.

=== Divisions ===
The district has three sub-divisions: Mushalpur, Salbari and Tamulpur. These sub-divisions are further divided into 13 revenue circles: Baksa, Barama, Tamulpur, Goreswar, Baganpara, Ghograpar, Barnagar, Bajali, Jalah, Patharighat, Rangia, Sarupeta and Tihu.

Three Vidhan Sabha constituencies of this district are Tamulpur, Barama and Chapaguri. All of these are part of Kokrajhar Lok Sabha constituency.

== Demographics ==
Historical population
Year	Pop.	±% p.a.
1901	71,620	—
1911	81,666	+1.32%
1921	95,160	+1.54%
1931	127,011	+2.93%
1941	167,589	+2.81%
1951	197,889	+1.68%
1961	309,224	+4.56%
1971	476,655	+4.42%
1991	769,402	+2.42%
2001	857,947	+1.10%
2011	950,075	+1.03%

Religions in residual Baksa district (2011)
Religion	Percent
Hinduism	82.40%
Islam	14.29%
Christianity	2.85%
Other or not stated	0.47%

Followers of Bathouism are counted under Hindus, there is no official data confirming their exact number. According to the 2011 census Baksa district has a population of 950,075. This gives it a ranking of 458th in India (out of a total of 640). The district has a population density of 475 inhabitants per square kilometre (1,230/sq mi). Its population growth rate over the decade 2001-2011 was 11.17%. Baksa has a sex ratio of 967 females for every 1000 males, and a literacy rate of 70.53%.

The residual Baksa district has a population of 560,925, of which 6,611 (1.18%) live in urban areas. The residual district has a sex ratio of 977 females per 1000 males. Scheduled Castes and Tribes made up 30,837 (5.50%) and 209,686 (37.38%) of the population respectively.

Languages of Baksa district (2011)
1. Assamese (38.3%)
2. Bodo (36.3%)
3. Bengali (17.7%)
4. Nepali (2.42%)
5. Sadri (1.61%)
6. Kurukh (1.47%)
7. Others (2.14%)

According to the 2011 census, 38.34% of the population spoke Assamese, 36.33% Boro, 17.69% Bengali, 2.42% Nepali, 1.61% Sadri and 1.47% Kurukh as their first language.

== Education ==
Major educational institutions of Baksa district include:

- Bagadhar Brahma Kishan College, Jalah
- Barama College, Barama
- Goreswar College, Goreswar
- Gyanpeeth Degree College, Nikashi
- Kendriya Vidyalaya, Tamulpur
- Ekalavya Model Residential School, Dalbari
- Jawahar Navodaya Vidyalaya, Mushalpur
- Barbari Nehru Higher Secondary school

== Tourism ==
=== Places of interest ===
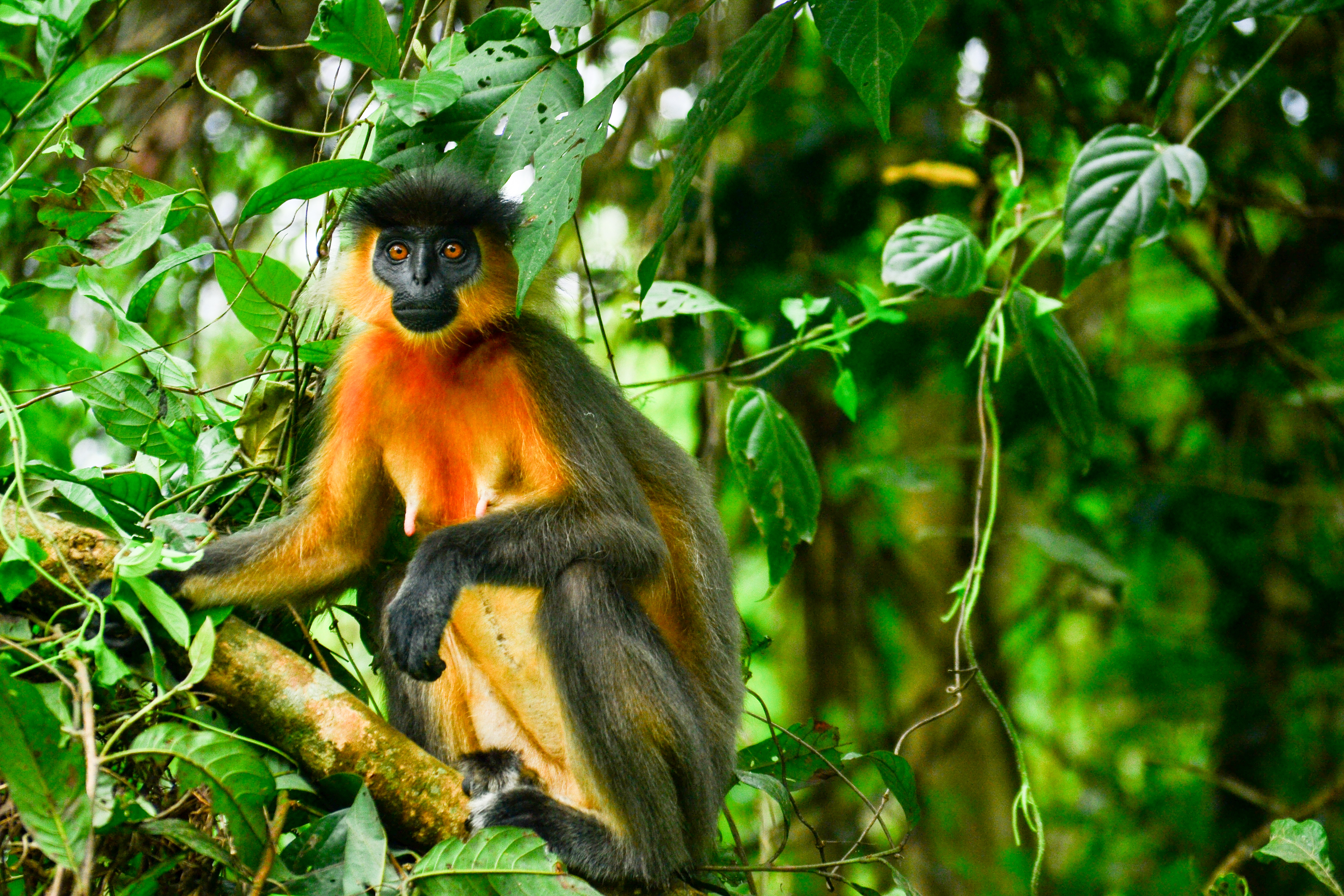
A capped langur at Manas National Park

A major part of the world-famous Manas National Park is located in this district. The park is well known for its tigers, greater one-horned rhinoceros, wild water buffaloes and golden langurs. Bogamati, Bhutan chowki and Daragaon are the famous picnic spot with picturesque beauties is located in Baksa. Bhangtar is the other scenic location situated close to Bhutan border.

== See also ==
- State of Assam
- Tamulpur sub-division
- Mushalpur sub-division
- Salbari sub-division
