= Panchigaon =

- village
- Interactive map of Panchigaon
- Country: India
- State: Assam
- District: Sonitpur

Government
  - Type: Federal parliamentary constitutional republic

Population (2011)
  - Total: 977 (508 are males & 469 are females)

Languages
  - Official: Assamese
- Time zone: UTC+5:30 (IST)
- Postal code: 784180

Panchigaon is a village in Sonitpur district, in the state of Assam in India. The village is located at the north bank of Brahmaputra River towards the town of Jamugurihat.

== Introduction ==
Panchigaon is a Village situated in Na-duar block tehsil of Sonitpur District . Which is located few kilometers North of Brahmaputra River & 6th edition of Kaziranga National Park. There are about 195 family resident in the Village.

The PWD Road to The 6th edition of Kaziranga National Park & to the end of the North Bank of the Brahmaputra River passes through the Village, Panchigaon. The Village Has a Namghar (literally Name House are places for congregational worship associated with the Ekasarana religion of Assam), a Library named Panchigaon Poothi Bhoral, One auditorium stage, (which is spelt Rangamancha in Assamese), 8 Shops (Assamese term Dokan, about 60% of Paddy fields (excluding the residential place), Some Ancient & Society Pool, there are mainly 5 ways that connects all communities to the PWD Road between Jamugurihat town & the North bank of the Brahmaputra River, and Several Others.

== History of its name ==
Some definitions of its name are dubious. A lot of different Incredible explanations have occurred to different minds But according to the elderly of the village, it has been assuming certainly their Opinions on The Name of the Village Panchigaon. They Said that the reason that the Village obtained the Name Panchigaon was only because of, there were only 5 (five=Assamese term Panch ) Residence on its nascent. ( Panch/Panchi means five '5' & Gaon means Village)*

== See also ==
- Jamugurihat
