= Nagsankar Mandir =

Indian 4th century temple

Nagsankar mandir
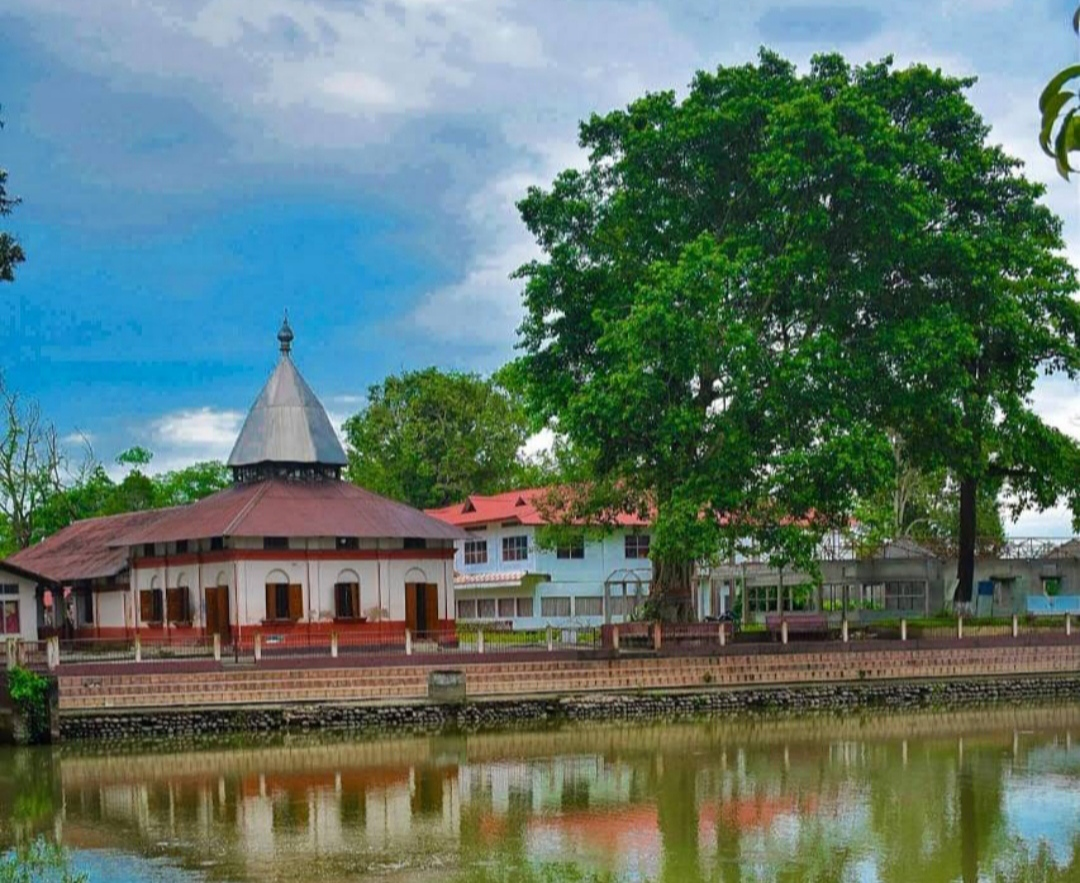

Religion
- Affiliation: Hinduism
- District: Sonitpur
- Deity: Shiva
- Festival: Maha Shivaratri

Location
- Location: Sootea, Tezpur
- State: Assam
- Country: India
- Interactive map of Nagsankar mandir

Architecture
- Type: Assamese
- Creator: King Narasankar of Nagakha in the 4th century
- Completed: 4th century
- Temple: One
- Inscriptions: Sanskrit

The Nagsankar Temple is a shrine in Nagsankar Mouza near Sootea, to the east of Tezpur, in Sonitpur District of Assam. The temple is believed to be built by King Narasankar of Nagakha in the 4th century.

== Geography ==
Nagsankar Mandir is 15 km (9.3 mi) west of Biswanath Chariali.

== History ==
The name of the temple was at first Navishankar and later on became Nagshankar.

== Turtle pond ==
Nag-Sankar Temple has a large pond with more than five hundred of rare variety of soft-shell turtles.

Species include Nilssonia gangetica, the Indian softshell turtle, listed as Vulnerable by the International Union for Conservation of Nature and Chitra indica, the South Asian narrow-headed softshell turtle, listed as Endangered.

== See also ==
- Jamugurihat
- Tezpur
- Sootea
