= Mohoho =

Folk festival celebrated in the lower Assam region of India

- Nickname: Moho-ho
- Genre: Festival
- Frequency: Annually
- Location: Lower Assam division
- Country: India

Mohoho is a folk festival celebrated in the lower Assam region of India, especially in the districts of Kamrup, Goalpara, Barpeta, Nalbari, and Darrang. The festival is held in the month of Agrahayana or Aghun, which is November–December as per modern day Georgian Calendar, during the full moon night.

== Etymology ==
The name "Mohoho" is derived from the word "moh", which means "mosquito", and "ho", which means "to drive away", [ho-ho : to drive away]. The festival is a way to drive away mosquitoes and other pests that are common during this time of year.

== Observance ==
On the day of the festival, people gather in the village square and perform traditional dances and songs. They also make bamboo effigies of mosquitoes and burn them to symbolize the driving away of pests. The festival is a time for community bonding and celebrating the harvest.

Mohoho is a festival that is a part of the rich cultural heritage of Assam. It is a time to celebrate the harvest, reminder of the importance of community and cooperation, and drive away pests.

== Lyrics ==
The lyrics is as follows

অ’হৰি মহোহো।

মহ খেদবা টাকান লৌ॥

মহে বোলে মল্লু দে।

টেপল পুৰা খালু দে॥

টেপলত নহ’ল নুন।

চাউল লাগে দুণ দুণ॥

বাঁহৰ পাত চিকিমিকি।

আমাক নাংগে আধলি-সিকি॥

বাঁহৰ পাত পকা।

আমাক লাগে টকা॥

অ’ হৰি অ’ ৰাম

O Hari Maho-ho

Mah Kheidba Tokan Lo

Mahe Bule Moillu De

Tepol Pura Khali De

Tepolot Nahal Nun

Chaol Kahre Don Don

Baahor paat chikimiki

Amaak naange aadheli-siki

Baahor paat poka

Amaak laage toka

O Hari O Ram.

== See also ==
- Buka Bhaona
- Pachati
