= Bindukuri railway station =

Railway station in Assam

Bindukuri Railway Station

General information
- Location: Deka Chuburi, Bindukuri, Sonitpur district, Assam; India
- Coordinates: 26.709022°N 92.734685°E
- Elevation: 71 metres (233 ft)
- System: Indian Railways station
- Owner: Indian Railways
- Operator: Northeast Frontier Railway
- Line: Rangiya–Murkongselek section
- Platforms: 1
- Tracks: 1

Construction
- Structure type: Standard (on ground station)
- Parking: No
- Cycle facilities: No

Other information
- Status: Single diesel line
- Station code: BKTB
- Zone(s): Northeast Frontier Railway
- Division(s): Rangiya

History
- Rebuilt: 2015

Services
Preceding station	Indian Railways	Following station
Sessa towards ?	Northeast Frontier Railway zone Rangiya–Murkongselek section	Dekargaon towards ?
Location
- Location within Assam Location within India

Bindukuri Railway Station is a railway station on Rangiya–Murkongselek section under Rangiya railway division of Northeast Frontier Railway zone. This railway station is situated at Deka Chuburi, Bindukuri in Sonitpur district in the Indian state of Assam.
