= Kumar Gaon =

Village in Assam

Kumar gaon
- Village
- Location in Assam, India Kumar gaon (India)
- Coordinates: 26.66°N 92.77°E
- Country: India
- State: Assam
- District: Sonitpur

Population (2011)
  - Total: 1,113

Languages
  - Official: Assamese
- Time zone: UTC+5:30 (IST)
- Postal code: 784150
- Vehicle registration: AS

Kumar Gaon is a village in Tezpur Block, Sonitpur district of Assam state in India. Kumar Gaon population in 2022 is estimated to be approx 1,247. According to 2011 census population is 1,091

== Demographics ==
Kumar gaon has a population of 1113, among them 573 are male and 540 are female as per the 2011 Population Census. The population of children aged 0–6 is 96, or 8.63% of the total. The average sex ratio is 942, lower than the Assam state average of 958. The child sex ratio for Kumar gaon is 920, lower than Assam's average of 962.

| Particulars | Total | Male | Female |
|---|---|---|---|
| Totel No of houses | 250 | × | × |
| Population | 1113 | 573 | 540 |
| Children (0-6) | 96 | 50 | 46 |
| Schedule caste | 26 | 12 | 14 |
| Schedule tribe | 4 | 2 | 2 |
| Total workers | 376 | 320 | 56 |

== Climate ==
Kumar Gaon has a moderate to warm climate in summer and in February is slightly chillier, with the temperature during the period around 18 to 23-degree C.

== See also ==
- Jamugurihat
- Tezpur
