= Rangachakua =

- Village of Assam
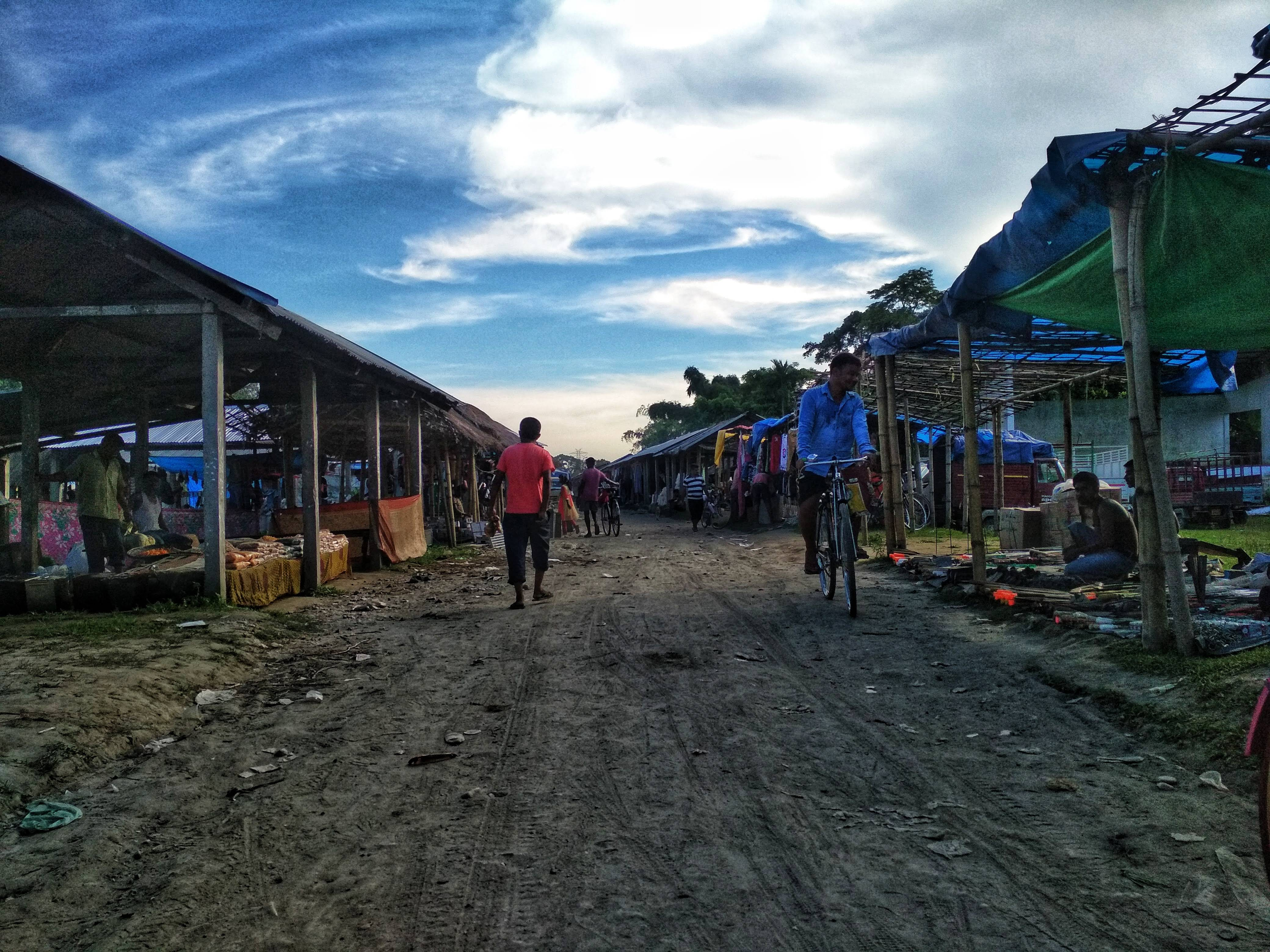
- Rangachakua Village

- Village in Assam, India
- Coordinates: 26.73°N 92.93°E
- Established: First half of the 20th century
- Village committee: Rangachakua

Government
  - Lok Sabha constituencies: Tezpur
  - Vidhan Sabha constituencies: Sootea

Area
  - Total: 3 km^{2} (1.2 sq mi)
- Elevation: 48–560 m (157–1,837 ft)

Population (2011)
  - Total: 2,105
  - Density: 700/km^{2} (1,800/sq mi)

Languages
  - Official: Assamese
- Time zone: UTC+5:30 (IST)
- Postal code: 784182 / 784185
- ISO 3166 code: IN-AS
- Vehicle registration: AS12

Rangachakua is a village and a central area for some villages situated in Sonitpur district, in the Indian state of Assam. It provide various economic, financial and organizational service to the surrounding Region having the only bank in the area, only Higher Secondary.

== Etymology ==
According to folklore, this area was formerly thickly vegetated. Bordikarai (Dikkarika) river was planned to flow from the edge of a curve. The river was in the middle of the trees, which were stunted and reddish in colour. As a result, in the computation, the phrase ′′ Ranga+Suk ′′ (Red-corner) is referred to as ′′ Rangachakua ′′. Another possible reason for this naming can be a local breed of rice called Rangachakua.

== Climate ==
Rangachakua has a mild to warm climate in the summer and a colder environment in the winter. During this time, the temperature would range between 18 and 23 degrees Celsius. Rangachakua climate makes it ideal for a variety of agricultural activities.

== Organization ==
Rangachakua's forwardness can be estimated by its "Rangachakua Pathar Porichalona Samiti" which was an innovative agricultural organization formed a decade ago by the local villagers. It was one of only four of its kind in the whole Sonitpur District. At the present the small tea farmers are actively participating in the economic development and progress, organizing small tea growers learning session and workshops. Other organizations and institutions are:

=== Rangachakua SBI branch ===
The branch was established in 1989 when people from all over the Jamugurihat came to rangachakua for banking service. IFSC Code of Rangachakua SBI branch is SBIN0009142 and MICR No. is 784002514

=== Rangachakua Post Office ===
Serves the all 27 villages surrounding Rangachakua village. PIN of Rangachakua Post Office is previously 784185 but it changed to 784182

=== Rangachakua Higher Secondary School ===
Established in 1959, already celebrated golden jubilee. All the elites from the area studied there either till 10th or HS. It currently host only Arts and humanities stream. Once it was private and established by 5 of the local leaders that include Sonaram Das and Prabhuram Karki.

== See also ==
- Jamugurihat
