= Hem Barua (Tyagbir) =

Indian independence activist

Tyagbir Hem Barua
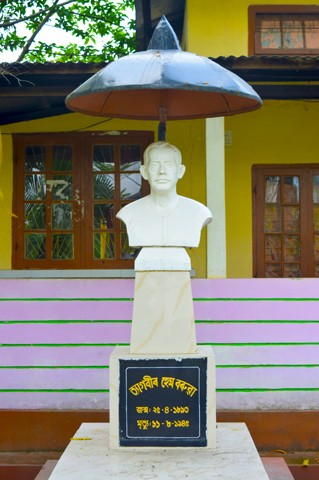
- Statue of Hem Baruah at Tyagbir Hem Barua College
- Born: 25 April 1893; Tezpur, Sonitpur, Assam
- Died: 11 August 1945 (aged 52); Guwahati, Assam
- Education: Cotton College, Guwahati
- Occupations: Indian independence activist, social worker and writer
- Movement: Indian independence activist
- Relatives: Gopal Chandra Barua; Padmawati Barua

Hem Barua (25 April 1893 – 11 August 1945) was an Indian independence activist, social worker and writer from Sonitpur district of the Indian state of Assam. For his remarkable works to the people of Assam, he is called Tyagbir.

== Early life and education ==
Hem Barua was born on 25 April 1893 to Gopal Chandra Barua and Padmawati Barua at Tezpur. He completed his high school education at "Barpeta H.S. School" in 1915. In 1919 he graduated with honours in English from Cotton College, Guwahati. In that period he was elected as G.S. to the Cotton College Student Union. During that period upon the call of Mahatma Gandhi in 1921, he left college and participated in the Indian independence movement and went to prison for six months. Later in 1925 in Calcutta he completed his legal education.

== Other works ==
Hem Bhawan and a statue of Hem Barua, Place: Tezpur, Assam

Barua was the president of the Golaghat convention of the Assam Chatra Sanmilan in 1919. He was also elected as secretary of the Assam Pradesh Congress Committee in 1922. He went to jail again in 1930 and 1933. Tezpur Academy, a pioneer education institution of that time was built in Tezpur, his birthplace.

== Literacy works ==
Congress Buranji and Bilatot Mohatma are books written by Barua. He also wrote articles for the Bahi magazine.

== Memorials and monuments ==
Tyagbir Hem Barua College, set up in 1963, was named after him by the people of Jamugurihat, which is situated in Naduar area in the Sonitpur district, in his honour. A building known as Hem Bhawan or Hem Barua Hall situated in the midst of Tezpur Town area and in front of Tezpur Police Station is dedicated to him. A statue of Hem Baruah is also constructed in front of the hall.

== See also ==
- Tyagbir Hem Barua College
- List of Assamese writers with their pen names
