= Gamiripal, Sonitpur =

Village in Assam

Gamiripal
- Village
- Location in Assam, India Gamiripal (India)
- Coordinates: 26.68°N 92.95°E
- Country: India
- State: Assam
- District: Sonitpur

Languages
  - Official: Assamese
- Time zone: UTC+5:30 (IST)
- Postal code: 784180
- Vehicle registration: AS

Gamiripal, also known as Hukai Gaon or Kumar gaon, is a village in Jamugurihat of Sonitpur district, in the Indian state of Assam.

== Geography ==
Gamiripal is a small village, situated in the Sonitpur district of Assam, covering an area of about 1.44 square kilometres (0.56 sq mi). Neighbour villages include Guwalpam, Talakabari, Khalihamari, Kathpora and Panpur. The village is by the Ghiladhari river, which is a major tributary of River Brahmaputra. The Village is located within the Naduar area and is about 3.5 km away from the heart of Jamugurihat towards east.

== Education ==
Gamiripal hosts several educational institutes, including:

- Holy Child English School (Jamugurihat) - Holy Child English School (Jamugurihat) is an English medium private school in Jamugurihat, Assam. It is located near Gamiripal road, Gopalpur, Jamugurihat.
- Sonit kuwar Gajen Barua High School - Sonit kuwar Gajen Barua High school established in 1986 is the only institute of higher education in the Gamiripal area under Sonitpur district of Assam.
- Gamiripal ME School - Gamiripal ME School was established in 1961 and it is a government School managed by the Department of Education, Government of Assam. It is located in Rural area. It is located in Naduar area of Sonitpur district of Assam. Few years back after the government decision Gamiripal ME School was amalgamate & merge to Gajen Barua High school
- Gamiripal LP School - Gamiripal LP School was established in 1912 and it is managed and maintained by the Department of Education, Government of Assam. It is located in Naduar revenue circle of Sonitpur district of Assam. The school also Work as a polling station for the Sootea (Vidhan Sabha constituency). The School has Eco Clubs under National Green Corps Program, Assam. Annual conference of Jamuguri Nepali Kabi Mancha 2021 held in this School.
- Gyan Jyoti prathamik Vidyalaya

== Organization and sights ==
Gamiripal has multiple organizations, cultural & historical sights and institutions, including :

- Gamiripal Post Office: Serves the about 16 villages surrounding Gamiripal village. PIN of Gamiripal Post Office is 784180.
- Gamiripal Hari Mandir: Gamiripal Hari Mandir is a Lord Shiva temple situated in the heart of Gamiripal Village. The temple is managed and maintained by the Gamiripal Gaon Sangathan Samiti.
- Natya Mandir: Natya Mandir is a community hall in Gamiripal which was created by the Red Horns Division of the Indian Army under Op Sadbhavana Project 2018-19. The Gamiripal Natya Mandir is work as a major culture institution. The Jamugurihat branch of Assam Nepali Sahitya Sabha (ANSS) is also located there .
- Gamiripal bridge: Gamiripal bridge is a pre-stressed concrete road bridge, The bridge spans the Ghiladhari River, a major tributary of the Brahmaputra River. The bridge connects Gamiripal village to rest of the villages.
- Batiyaroka Satsang kendra: Batiyaboka Satsang kendra is a satsang kendra situated in the Batiyaroka village, Gamiripal, jamugurihat, Assam. This satsang kendra is established in the year of 1939. This satsang centre has a historical value among the people of Gamiripal.

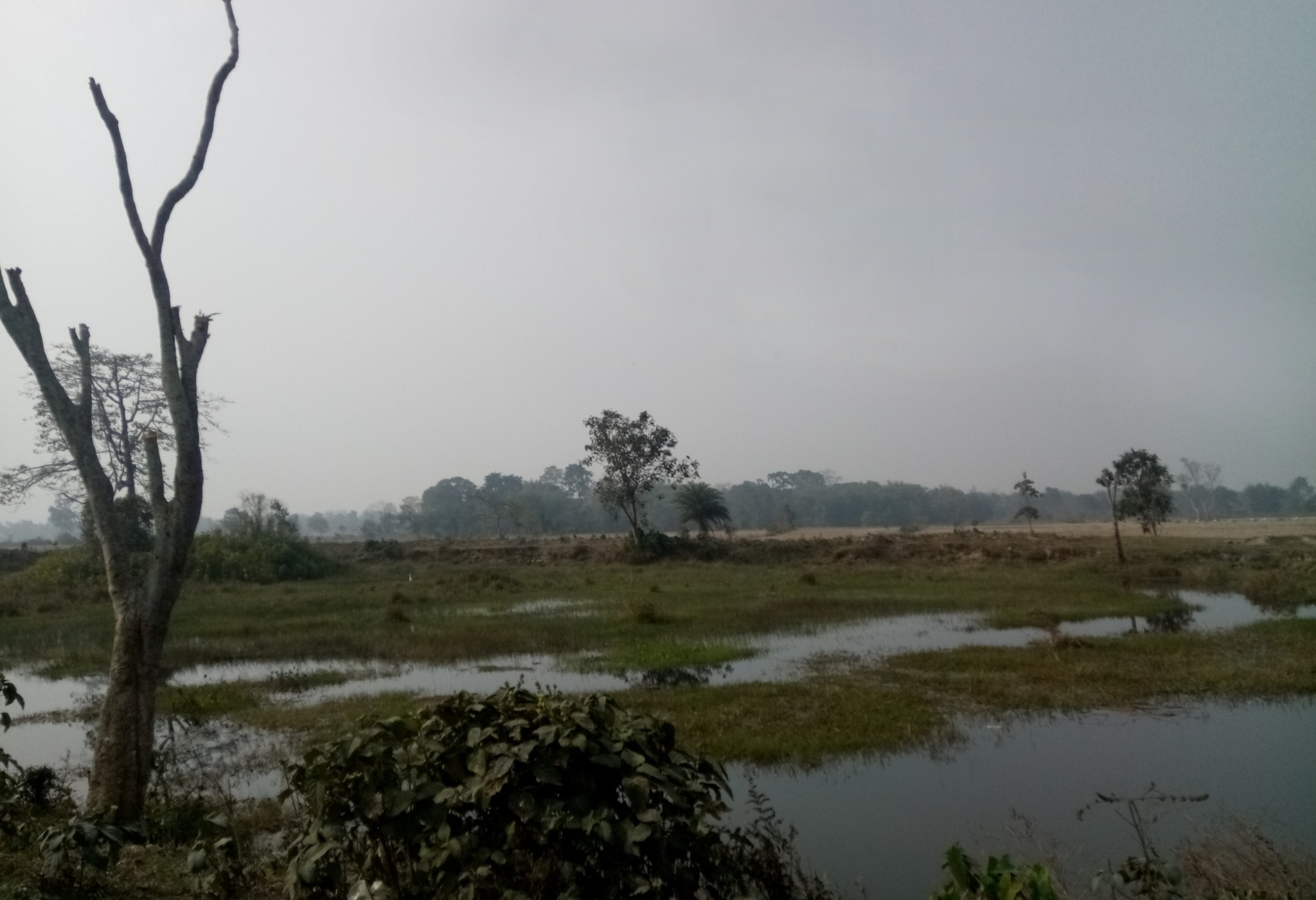
Hukai Pukhuri

- Hukai Pukhuri: Hukai Pukhuri is historical pond that was dug by King Hukai Bhuyan to bathe his 4 daughters. It is situated near Panchigaon Hukai Pathar.
- Hari Mandir: Gamiripal Hari mandir is an old temple. It is situated near Gamiripal Road.
- Gamiripal SC: Gamiripal Sub centre is a health care sub center under the Jamuguri SHC. It is a government health care unit managed and maintained By national health Mission Assam Gamiripal SC plays an important role during the COVID-19 pendamic. COVID-19 vaccine and other drugs are available there.

== Tribes and community ==
People of Gamiripal are either Mongolians or Aryans. Mongolian tribes include Deori, Chutia, Ahom, Bodo, Karbi, Nishi, Nepali, Brahmins, Goshai, kaibatra, Mahanta, Koch, Kalita, Sut, Motok and others.

== Culture ==
Residents of Gamiripal follow various religious and cultural beliefs. It is a meeting place of religions such as Hinduism, Islam, Christianity and Vaishnavi.
