= Baresahariya Bhaona =

Barechahariya Bhaona
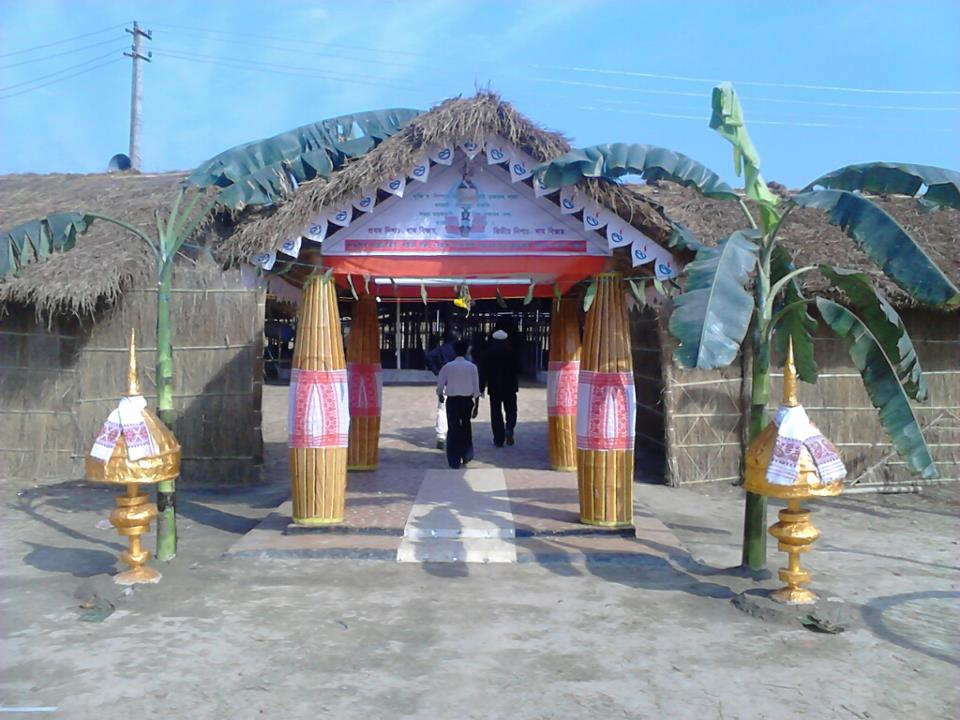
- Entrance of Barechahariya Bhaona Mahotsav
- Status: Active
- Genre: Hindu festival
- Locations: Jamugurihat, Sonitpur, Assam
- Country: India
- Inaugurated: 1797-98
- Organizer: People of Jamugurihat
- Website: www.barechahariabhowna.com

Barechahariya Bhaona (Assamese: বাৰেচহৰীয়া ভাওনা) is a 200-year-old drama festival held every 5–6 years at Jamugurihat, a small town in Sonitpur District, Assam. The festival was first held in 1797-98. Led by Gayan Bora and sounds of Doba, Kanh, Bhortal and Khol resonates amidst the audience to signal the start of the Barechaharia Bhaowna. This tradition that dates back two centuries, livens up the small town of Jamugurihat.

== History ==
Barechaharia Bhaona has changed a lot in the 220 years since its inception, when Hukai Dekagiri first organised it at Raghudoloni-Pothar (paddy field) of the village Pasigaon in present day Jamugurihat of Assam in 1797. This festival is celebrated every five years on the full moon day of Chot (usually in March or April) as per the Assamese Calendar. Recently however, locals have agreed to celebrate this event on the full moon day of Fagoon (usually in February or March) to avoid conflict with the April Bordoichila ("thunderstorm").

Typically the Bhaona is a dramatization of stories from Ramayana, Mahabharata, and Puranas. However, in this style created by the Mahapurush Sankardev, a Vaishnavite saint is depicted with Bhakti Rasa in the form of different Raga & Tala. The saint's main goal was to bring together the diverse society through entertainment and share the teachings of Vaishnavism. The blending of religion and culture has helped this festival last over the years, while keeping its storytelling alive.

== Bhaona customs ==
The Bhaona is held in a Namghar, the traditional prayer house of a village unit called Khel, and also in Sattras, a monastery-like institution promoting the Sankari culture, founded by Sankardev. In the traditional Bhaona, there are a group singers and drummers who begin the orchestra (Jora) in Sankari style followed by the entry of Sutradhar who recites slokas and narrates the entire story of the drama to be performed. The director, known as Gayanbora, lets other performers know when to make their entry onto the stage. Nam prasanga meanskirtana also is an integral part of the Bhaona. Brajabuli is used to script the dialogues. The concept of Barechaharia Bhaona is derived from the traditional Bhaona and in this festival, unlike other Bhaona, it is performed simultaneously by teams from the different villages of the region on several stages with the holy altar in the center.
