= Thakurbari railway station =

Railway station in Assam

Thakurbari Railway Station

General information
- Location: Thakurbari, Rangapara, Sonitpur district, Assam; India
- Coordinates: 26.797642°N 92.699488°E
- Elevation: 81 metres (266 ft)
- System: Indian Railways station
- Owner: Indian Railways
- Operator: Northeast Frontier Railway
- Line: Rangiya–Murkongselek section
- Platforms: 1
- Tracks: 1

Construction
- Structure type: Standard (on ground station)
- Parking: No
- Cycle facilities: No

Other information
- Status: Single diesel line
- Station code: TKTB
- Zone(s): Northeast Frontier Railway
- Division(s): Rangiya

History
- Rebuilt: 2015

Services
Preceding station	Indian Railways	Following station
Rangapara North Junction towards ?	Northeast Frontier Railway zone Rangiya–Murkongselek section	Sessa towards ?
Location
- Location within Assam Location within India

Thakurbari Railway Station is a railway station on Rangiya–Murkongselek section under Rangiya railway division of Northeast Frontier Railway zone. This railway station is situated at Thakurbari, Rangapara in Sonitpur district in the Indian state of Assam.
