= Sessa railway station =

Railway station in Assam

Sessa Railway Station

General information
- Location: Kutuha Kachari Gaon, Sessa, Sonitpur district, Assam; India
- Coordinates: 27.32406°N 94.85767°E
- Elevation: 76 metres (249 ft)
- System: Indian Railways station
- Owner: Indian Railways
- Operator: Northeast Frontier Railway
- Line: Rangiya–Murkongselek section
- Platforms: 1
- Tracks: 1

Construction
- Structure type: Standard (on ground station)
- Parking: No
- Cycle facilities: No

Other information
- Status: Single diesel line
- Station code: SETB
- Zone(s): Northeast Frontier Railway
- Division(s): Rangiya

History
- Rebuilt: 2015

Services
| Preceding station | Indian Railways | Following station |
|---|---|---|
| Thakurbari towards ? | Northeast Frontier Railway zone Rangiya–Murkongselek section | Bindukuri towards ? |
Location
- Location within Assam Location within India

Sessa Railway Station is a railway station on Rangiya–Murkongselek section under Rangiya railway division of Northeast Frontier Railway zone. This railway station is situated at Kutuha Kachari Gaon, Sessa, Rangapara in Sonitpur district in the Indian state of Assam.
