= Hugrajuli railway station =

Railway station in Assam

Hugrajuli Railway Station

General information
- Location: Praja Basti Pathar, Hugrajuli, Sonitpur district, Assam; India
- Coordinates: 26.805203°N 92.358641°E
- Elevation: 115 metres (377 ft)
- System: Indian Railways station
- Owner: Indian Railways
- Operator: Northeast Frontier Railway
- Line: Rangiya–Murkongselek section
- Platforms: 1
- Tracks: 1

Construction
- Structure type: Standard (on ground station)
- Parking: No
- Cycle facilities: No

Other information
- Status: Single diesel line
- Station code: HJLI
- Zone(s): Northeast Frontier Railway
- Division(s): Rangiya

History
- Rebuilt: 2015

Services
Preceding station	Indian Railways	Following station
Majbat towards ?	Northeast Frontier Railway zone Rangiya–Murkongselek section	Dhekiajuli Road towards ?
Location
- Location within Assam Location within India

Hugrajuli Railway Station is a railway station on the Rangiya–Murkongselek section under the Rangiya railway division of the Northeast Frontier Railway zone. This railway station is situated at Praja Basti Pathar, Hugrajuli in Sonitpur district in the Indian state of Assam.
