= Guwahati–Dekargaon Intercity Express =

Train in Jndia

Overview
- Service type: Intercity
- Locale: Assam
- First service: 4 January 2014; 12 years ago
- Current operator: Northeast Frontier Railway zone

Route
- Termini: Guwahati (GHY); Dekargaon (DKGN)
- Stops: 10
- Distance travelled: 189 km (117 mi)
- Average journey time: 4h 45m
- Service frequency: Daily (Note: Runs seven days in a week for every direction.)
- Train number: 15815/15816

On-board services
- Class: Unreserved
- Seating arrangements: Yes
- Sleeping arrangements: Yes
- Catering facilities: No
- Observation facilities: ICF coach
- Entertainment facilities: No

Technical
- Rolling stock: 2
- Track gauge: 1,676 mm (5 ft 6 in)
- Operating speed: 41 km/h (25 mph)
Route map
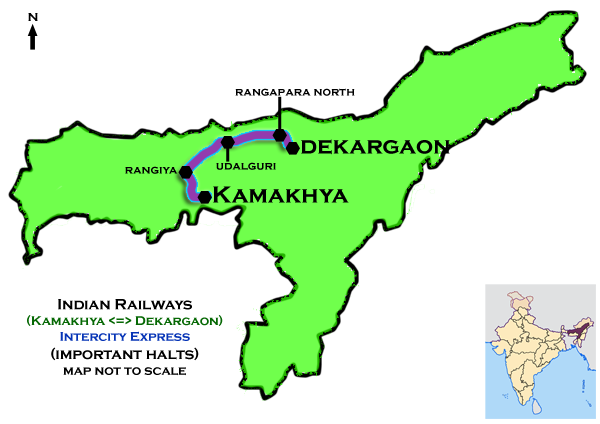

A

Guwahati–Dekargaon Intercity Express is an intercity train belonging to Northeast Frontier Railway zone that runs between Guwahati and Dekargaon. It is currently being operated with 15815/15816 train numbers on a daily basis.

== Service ==
The 15815/Guwahati–Dekargaon Intercity Express has an average speed of 41 km/h and covers 183 km in 4h 25m. The 15816/Dekargaon–Guwahati Intercity Express has an average speed of 40 km/h and covers 183 km in 4h 35m.

== Route and halts ==
- Kamakhya Junction
- Rangiya Junction
- Udalguri
- Dhekiajuli Road
- Rangapara North Junction
- Dekargaon

== Coach composition ==
The train has standard ICF rakes with a maximum speed of 110 km/h. The train consists of 12 coaches:

- 10 General
- 2 Second-class Luggage/parcel van

== Traction ==
Both trains are hauled by a Guwahati Loco Shed-based WDM-3A or WDM-3D diesel locomotive from Guwahati to Tezpur and vice versa.

== See also ==
The train shares its rake with:

- 55823/55824 Rangapara North–Dekargaon Passenger
- 55861/55862 Rangiya–Dekargaon Passenger
- 55813/55814 Dekargaon–Murkongselek Passenger
- 55811/55812 Dhubri–Kamakhya Passenger

== Direction reversal ==
The train reverses its direction 2 times:

- Rangiya Junction
- Rangapara North Junction

== See also ==
- Kamakhya Junction railway station
- Dekargaon railway station
- Dekargaon–Murkongselek Passenger
- Rangapara North–Dekargaon Passenger
- Dhubri–Kamakhya Passenger
- Rangiya–Dekargaon Passenger
