= Sootea =

Sootea Chatia
- Village/Town
- Location in Assam, India
- Coordinates: 26.7335°N 93.0465°E
- Country: India
- State: Assam
- District: Biswanath

Government
  - Type: Village/Town

Languages
  - Official: Assamese
- Time zone: UTC+5:30 (IST)
- Postal code: 784175

Sootea is located under Naduar revenue circle, under Tezpur sub-division, in Biswanath district, Assam state, India, formerly in the district of Sonitpur.

== Geography ==
There are 103 revenue villages, 128400 bigha 03 katha 10 lecha of land in Sootea sub-circle and its area is 158.90 square kilometres.

== Weather ==
In summer daytime highs are from 21 °C to 35 °C.

== Education ==
It is the site of Chatia College

== See also ==
- Jamugurihat
- Nagsankar Mandir
- Biswanath district
