= Haleswar Temple =

18th-century Hindu temple in Assam, India

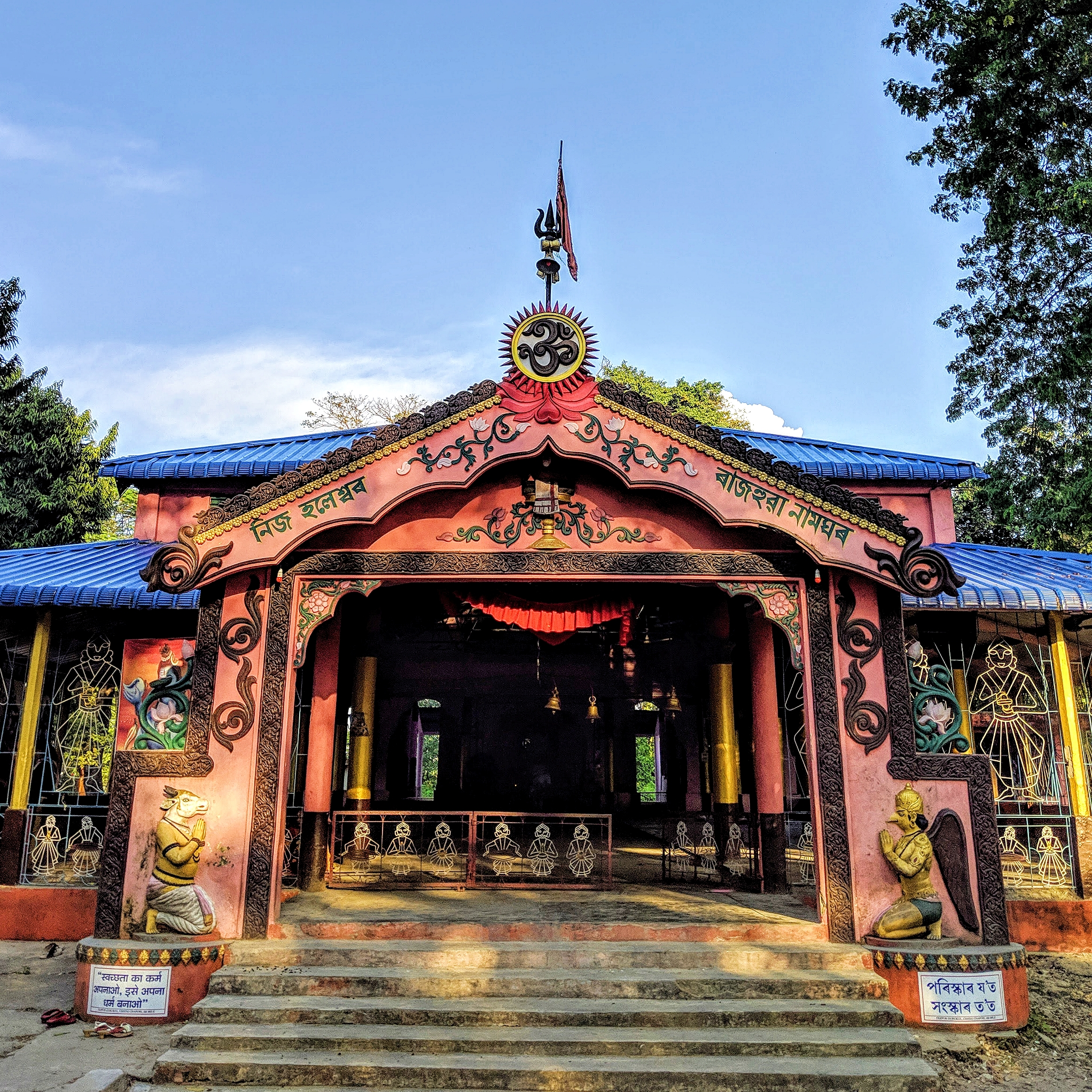
- Front view image of Haleswar Temple

Religion
- Affiliation: Hinduism
- District: Sonitpur
- Deity: Shiva, Vishnu

Location
- Location: Haleshwar
- State: Assam
- Country: India
- Interactive map of Haleswar Temple
- Coordinates: 26°42′30″N 92°46′03″E

Architecture
- Style: Nilachal Architecture
- Established: 1705 AD

Haleswar Temple is an 18th-century Hindu temple, located about 10 kilometers north of Tezpur in the state of Assam.

== History ==
This temple, established by the king who founded the capital of Kamrupa at Harupeswar, holds the distinction of being the oldest temple. According to mythology, a linga was discovered by a farmer while plowing the fields. The farmer, known as Halowa colloquially, gave rise to the term Haleswar derived from "Halowa" Initially, a temple was built upon the linga, and later, in 1705 A.D., it was reconstructed by King Rudra Singha of the Ahom dynasty.

The temple is unique in its status as a place of worship for both Vaishavites and Shivaites.

== Connectivity ==
Nearest Airport: Tezpur Airport (2 km)

Nearest Railway Station:

- Dekargaon Railway Station (4.6 km),
- Rangapara North Junction Railway Station (17.1 km)

Bus Station: ASTC (10.9 km)
