= Bhaona =

Traditional form of play from Assam, India

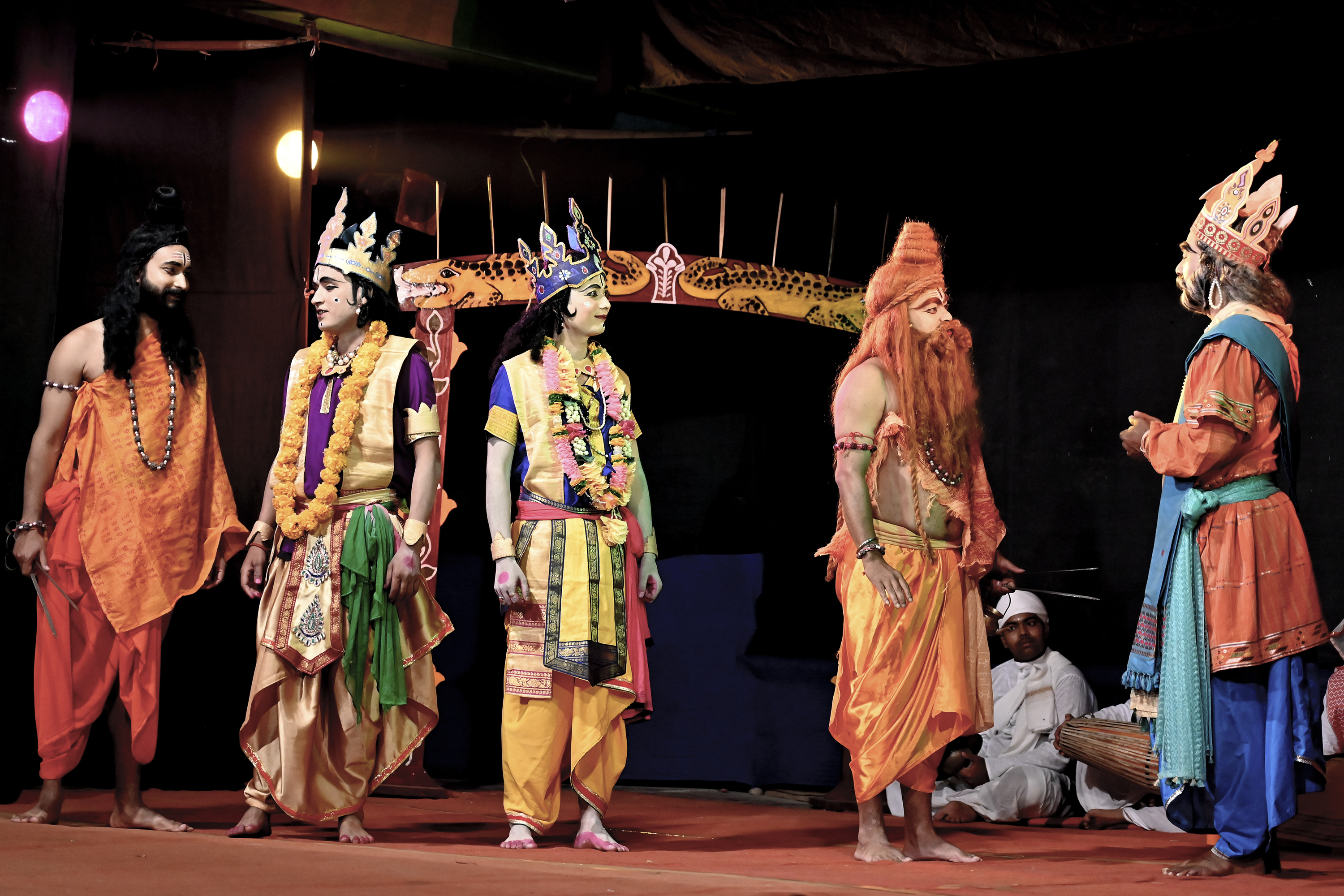
A bhaona performance

Bhaona is a traditional performing art form that originated in Assam. It is a Hindu religious art form, in which scenes are enacted from various mythological events and folklore. The art evolved from the songs composed by Vaishnavite saint Sankardev in the early sixteenth century CE.

A Bhaona is a performance of a nat or one-act play. A sutradhar acts as the director and narrator of the performance. The act is performed by actors (bhaoriya) accompanied by singers (gayan), and music from traditional instruments played by instrumentalists (baayan). It is mainly of two types, 1. Bhaona and 2. Ankiya nat.

Originally, Bhaona was made in the language "Barjawalli", which was a language made by Srimant Sankardeva. In modern bhaona "Matrivasha" or mother tongue is used i.e. Assamese.

== History ==
A Bhaona is a traditional performing art form that originated in Assam. It is a staging or performance of an Ankiya Nat or a one-act play (Ankit meaning one act and Nat means play or drama).

Sankardev was a Vaishnavite saint and polymath from the 15-16th century CE. As Sankardev adopted a spiritual life, he traveled across the lands and came across the various tribes of the hills. With the thought of conveying religious messages and ethical ways of life, he composed several songs, which formed basis of the Ankiya Bhaona art form. Sankaradeva took inspiration from various Sanskrit texts, and modeled the bhaonas on them. The act generally involves stories from Hindu mythology and folklore. It usually revolves around the theme of victory of good over evil, and incorporates some kind of divine incorporation in the plays.

== Performance ==
The performance can be enacted any time during the day or night, all through the year. There are no specific time restrictions or seasons prescribed for the art form. The art form are also varies across the satras (Vaishnavite religious institutions) the actors are affiliated to. A single bhaona performance can extend for days, and can be held on consecutive nights.

=== Staging ===
The performance is usually carried out on an open stage in a public area. It can also be enacted in namghars and enclosed pandals. The stage is usually circular with audience seated around the same. Rectangular stages with raised platforms on one end are also used. A green room is made of temporary cloth screens, and the actors enter and exit the stage via the room.

There are various different types of lights used to light the stage. Traditional lights placed around the stage consist of castor oil poured into hollowed out banana stems called bhotas. Earthen lamps are placed on special curved structures made of a special type of bamboo called balukha and torches are also used. Various colours are also brought up using special tools called sengelis, which are made of plant based material filled in pipes in a process known as mota.

The public are informed of a bhaona performance orally beforehand. The audience are seated in separated sections with land owners given priority. The audience are usually served betel leaves and betel nuts.

=== Participants ===
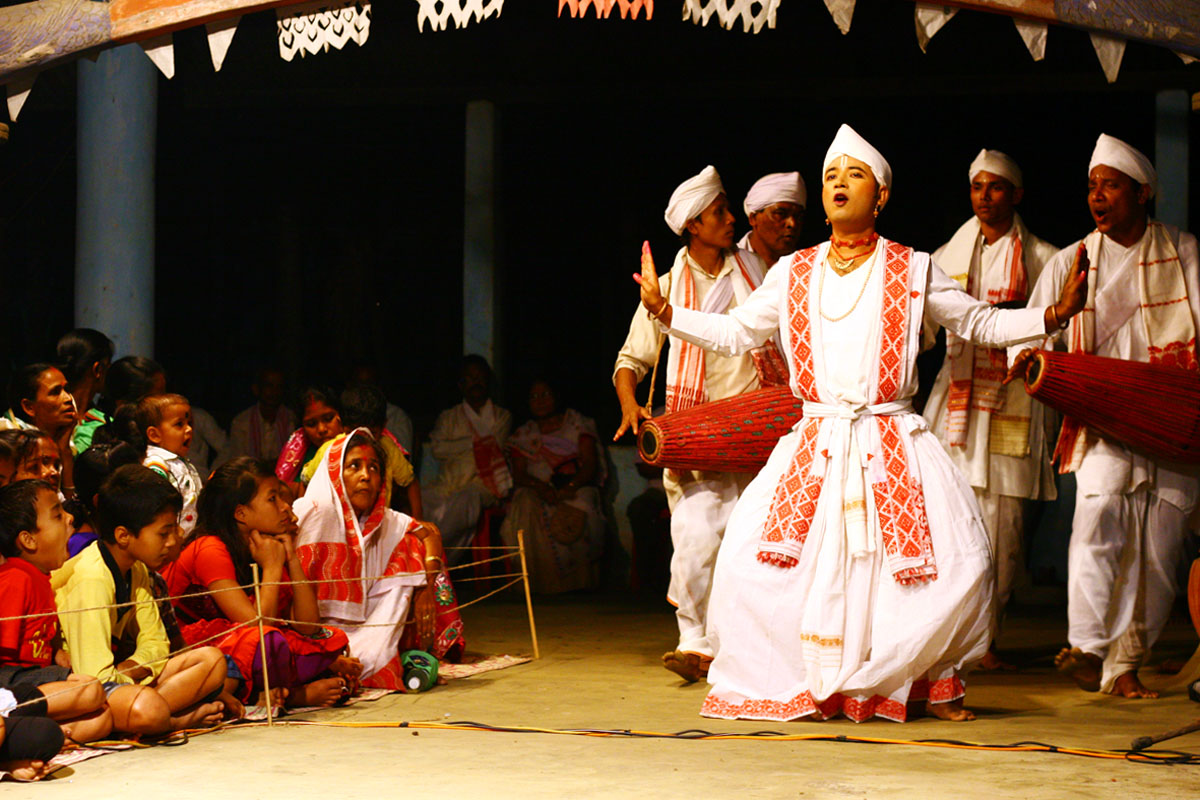
A Sutradhar in a bhaona

A sutradhar forms the central part of the act. He acts as the director and narrator of the performance, while simultaneously engaging in singing and dancing. He introduces the characters, and controls their entry and exit from the act. Compared to Sanskrit plays where the sutradhar is limited to introducing and directing the act, the sutradhar in bhaonas take up a greater role. Once someone attains a position of sutradhar, he remains so, and becomes a teacher to the younger artists.

The act is performed by actors called Bhaoriya, who are accompanied by singers (Gayan), and music from traditional instruments played by instrumentalists (Baayan). No women take part in the play, and female roles are enacted by men itself. A single act in a bhaona is performed by bhaoriyas usually belonging to village of a specific satra. While actors can be exchanged within the same satra, it is prohibited to cross over to another satra.

=== Costume and makeup ===
The sutradhar dresses in a white, tight fitting vest with a ghuri, which consists of a single piece of cloth passed over the shoulders and crisscrossed at the chest to be tied at the waist. He wears silk turbans with golden borders, adorned with garlands of tulsi leaves. The sutradhar also wears special anklets called nupurs, made of iron or brass with metal pieces inside. The gaayan and baayan wear a pointed headgear with a garland of tulsi, and white dresses made of Assam silk.

Artisans who enact the role of Krishna usually are coloured in blue and wear a yellow coloured dhoti. Various colours for the makeup are obtained from natural plant based dyes called hengul hightali. The makeup man known as khanikar also uses products such as vermillion, earthworm extract, ash, jaggery, and gum extracted from trees for makeup. Participants use various types of masks to enact characters such as devas, asuras, and other types of animals and birds. These masks are made of burnt mud, and are painted accordingly. Masks are specifically used in satriya dances. Some of the actors might dress up as clowns to entertain the audience.

=== Music ===
During the act, singers sing the songs mostly from the compositions of Sankardev. The songs are called Ankia Geet, composed across approximately 33 ragas. These songs are in two languages–Assamese and Brajavali languages. While Assamese is the native language, Brajavali was chosen by Sankardev as he probably felt that the scenes can be better expressed using the language. Words from Assamese are also extensively used in Brajavali plays as well. The songs sung during the act are classified into ghosas and vilaps.

The performance is accompanied by traditional instruments such as khols, and tols. There are always an even numbers khols, which can range from two to sixty.

=== Act ===
At the beginning of the performance, a prominent person narrates the history of bhaona (ittibritta) in a song called malita. The baayans play the khols in two or three stages with brief pauses in between in a performance known as dhyamali. It is accompanied by a chorus of gaayans. The players often jump and give jerking movements while playing the instruments. Before the start of a dhyamali, lights are lighted on the stage. After this, the sutradhar enters the stage screened by a white cloth held by his assistants. Once the screen is removed, he welcomes and salutes the audience with a namaskar, and starts narrating the synopsis of the act. The sutradhar generally sings about Vishnu's ten avatars before the same.

The main act follows, accompanied by music and songs. A sutradhar is always present during the entire course of the act, narrating the scenes and making entrance on to the stage at appropriate times. Four types of dances–krishna nas, gopi nas, ras nas and notua nas are performed in a bhaona. The act usually ends with a song known as koilankharman, which signifies the end of a bhaona.

== Variants ==
A form of puppetry called Putala Bhaona is also practised in the region, which draws stories from the traditional Bhaona. Baresahariya Bhaona and Buka Bhaona are bhaona festivals based on the art form.
