= Bura Chapori Wildlife Sanctuary =

Protected area in Assam, India

- IUCN category IV (habitat/species management area)
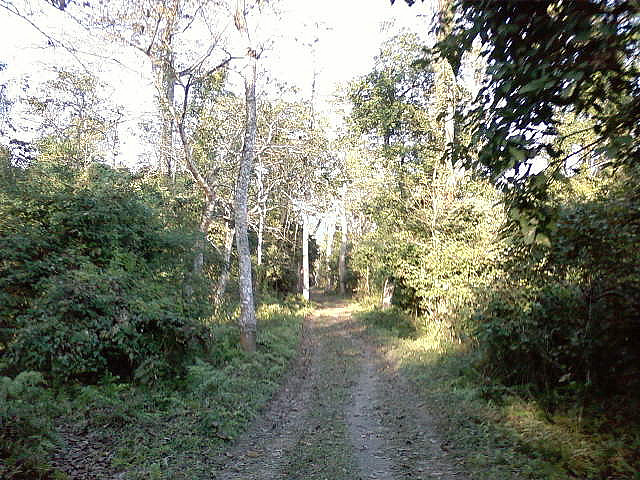

- Location within Assam Location within India
- Interactive map of Bura Chapori Wildlife Sanctuary
- Location: Assam, India
- Nearest city: Tezpur
- Coordinates: 26°30′53″N 92°41′34″E
- Area: 44.06 sq. km
- Established: 1974; 52 years ago
- Governing body: Department of Environment & Forests, Assam

Bura Chapori Wildlife Sanctuary is a protected area located in the state of Assam in India. This wildlife sanctuary covers 44.06 km^{2}, on the south bank of the Brahmaputra River in Sonitpur district. The area was declared a Reserved forest in 1974, it became a sanctuary in 1995. It is located 40 km from Tezpur town and 181 km away from Guwahati.It forms an integral part of the Laokhowa-Burachapori eco-system and is a notified buffer of the Kaziranga Tiger reserve.

== Biodiversity ==
It is considered to be an ideal habitat for the Bengal florican. It is a paradise for many migratory birds. Reptiles and fish are also found here. Other attractions are:

Mammals

Indian rhinoceros, tiger, leopard, wild buffalo, hog deer, wild pigs and occasionally a herd of elephants.

Birds

Bengal florican, black-necked stork, mallard, openbill stork, teal, whistling duck and many others.
