= Athkheliya Namghar =

Shri Shri Athkhelia Namghar
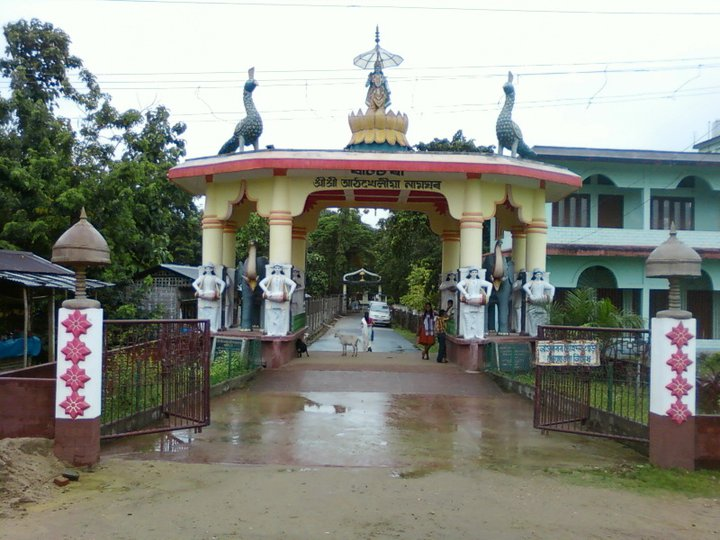
- Sri Sri Athkheliya Namghar Entrance

Religion
- Affiliation: Hinduism
- District: Golaghat

Location
- Location: Ghiladhari
- State: Assam
- Country: India
- Interactive map of Shri Shri Athkhelia Namghar
- Coordinates: 26.47°N 94.09°E

Architecture
- Creator: Gadapani
- Completed: 1681; 345 years ago

Website
- athkhelianamghar.org

Sri Sri Athkheliya Namghar or Sri Sri Athkhelia Namghar is a prominent pilgrimage place of Assam and North Eastern India. It is located at Bosa Gaon, Golaghat, Assam where the three rivers - Ghiladhari, Mokrong and Kakodonga meet. Before 1970s, temple was called Sri Sri Athkheliya temple but later, it was renamed as the Sri Sri Athkheliya Namghar due to the influence of Vaishnavism.

== Etymology ==
Sri Sri Athkheliya is named after the eight kuris or "neighbourhoods" or "parts". As the people of these eight kuris together have formed a society and have carried out religious works together there, the place received the name of Sri Sri Athkhelia Namghar.As per the Paik system, groups above the paiks were called khels. Some such royal persons, or post-holders settled in neighbourhoods: the name of the khels were decided upon the 'post' of the post-holder.

Before 1970, Sri Sri Athkheliya Namghar was known as Sri Sri Athkhelia Hori Mandir. Even now on its entrance, the inscription reads "Sri Sri Athkheliya Hori Mandir". After 1970, it was renamed as the Sri Sri Athkheliya Namghar.

== History ==
The early history of the Athkhelia Namghar is uncertain. Local traditions associate the site with an ashram of a sage and preserve accounts concerning its earlier religious use, but these traditions are not corroborated by contemporary historical records.

The place was formerly known as Sri Sri Athkhelia Hori Mandir. Over time it developed into a namghar associated with Assamese Vaishnavism. The name Athkhelia is traditionally associated with the eight kuris, or neighbourhood groups, whose members jointly participated in the religious activities and administration of the institution.

== Location ==
Sri Sri Athkheliya Namghar (26.47°N 94.09°E) is located at Bosa Gaon, Ghiladhari, Golaghat, Assam. The place is about 18 kilometres (11 mi) away from Golaghat city. Starting their journey from the Naga hills, the three rivers join at a place very nearby the Sri Sri Athkheliya Namghar. The Matrang river meets northward flowing Ghiladhari river and finally both join the Kakodonga river nearby.

== Transportation ==
Airway

Jorhat Airport lies about 60 kilometres (37 mi) away from the centre.

Railway

The Forkating railway station is about 12.8 kilometres (8.0 mi) away from the centre.

Road

Golaghat is well connected by roads from all parts of Assam. Golaghat city is about 20 kilometres (12 mi) away from the centre and it takes about 40 minutes by bus to reach Sri Sri Athkhelia namghar from Golaghat city.
