= Rangiya–Rangapara North Passenger =

Train in India

Rangiya - Rangapara North Passenger
Overview
- Service type: Passenger
- First service: October 8, 2016; 8 years ago
- Current operator(s): Northeast Frontier Railway

Route
- Termini: Rangiya Junction (RNY); Rangapara North Junction (RPAN)
- Stops: 13
- Distance travelled: 123 km (76 mi)
- Average journey time: 2h 45min
- Service frequency: 6 days a week except Sunday.
- Train number(s): 55893/55894

On-board services
- Class(es): Unreserved
- Seating arrangements: Yes
- Sleeping arrangements: No
- Catering facilities: No
- Entertainment facilities: No
- Baggage facilities: Below the seats

Technical
- Rolling stock: ICF coach
- Track gauge: 5 ft 6 in (1,676 mm)
- Electrification: No
- Operating speed: 45 km/h (28 mph) average with halts

The Rangiya - Rangapara North Passenger is a passenger train belonging to Northeast Frontier Railway that runs between Rangiya Junction and Rangapara North Junction. It is currently being operated with 55893/55894 train numbers on a daily basis.

== Service ==
The 55893/Rangiya - Rangapara North Passenger runs with an average speed of 41 km/h and completes 123 km in 3h. The 55894/Rangapara North - Rangiya Passenger runs with an average speed of 45 km/h and completes 126 km in 2h 45m.

== Route and halts ==
The important halts of the train are:

- Rangiya Junction
- Udalguri
- Rangapara North Junction

== Coach composite ==
The train has standard ICF rakes with max speed of 110 kmph. The train consists of 10 coaches:

- 8 General Unreserved
- 2 Seating cum Luggage Rake

== Traction ==
Both trains are hauled by a Siliguri Loco Shed based WDP-4D diesel locomotive from Rangiya to Rangapara and vice versa.

== Rake sharing ==
The train shares its rake with 55895/55896 Rangiya - Murkongselek Passenger.

== See also ==
- Rangiya Junction railway station
- Rangapara North Junction railway station
