= Padma Hazarika =

Indian politician

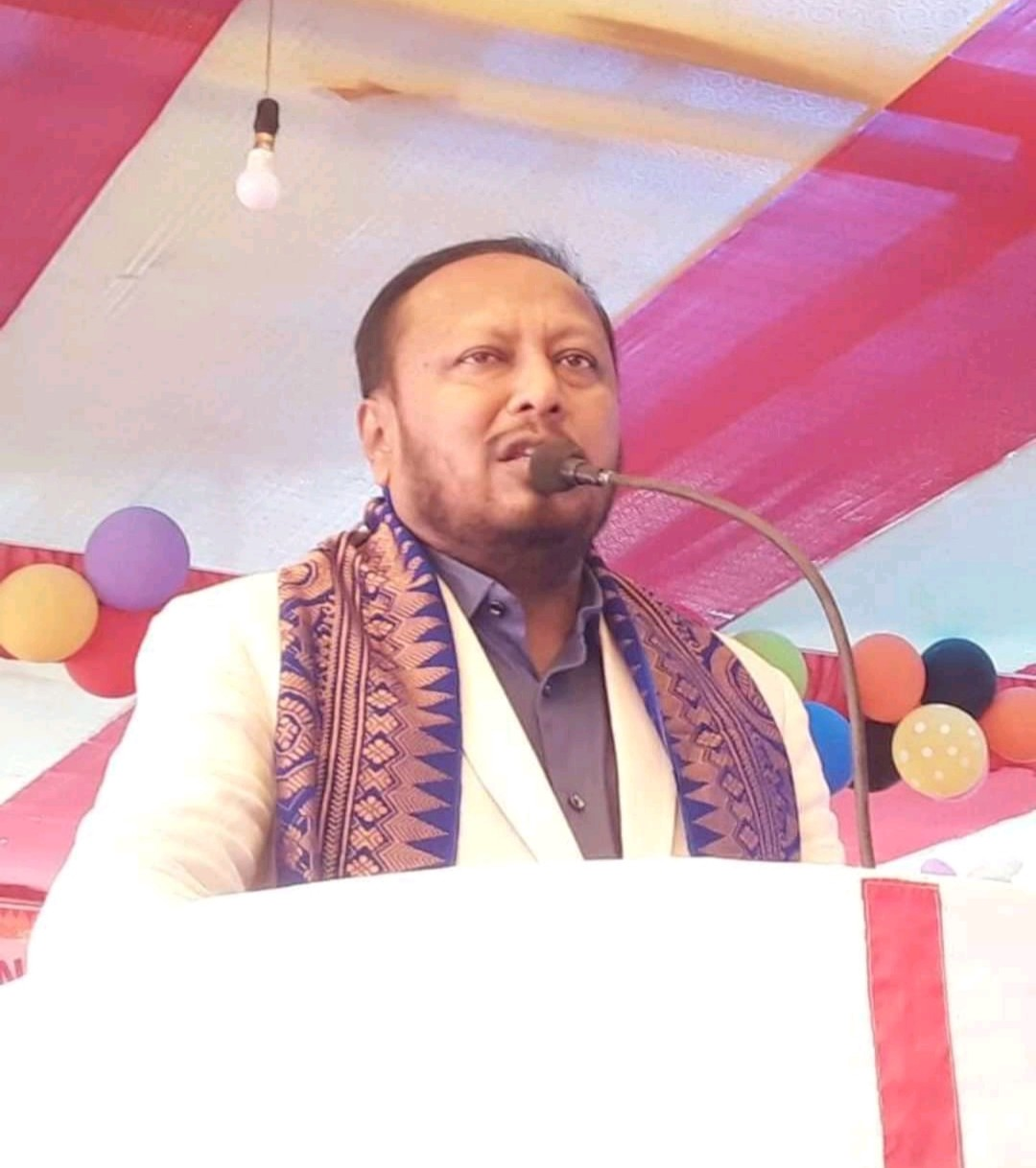

Member of Assam Legislative Assembly
- Constituency: Sootea

Personal details
- Born: Sootea, Assam, India
- Party: Bharatiya Janata Party (present)
- Other political affiliations: Asom Gana Parishad
- Spouse: Smritirekha Hazarika
- Children: 2 nos.
- Parent(s): Late Gunadhar Hazarika (Father); Rameshwari Hazarika (Mother)
- Occupation: Politician
- Profession: Business, tea garden and tea factory owner

Padma Hazarika is a Bharatiya Janata Party politician from Assam. He was elected to the Assam Legislative Assembly in the 1996, 2006, 2011, 2016 and 2021 elections from Sootea constituency. Formerly, he was with Asom Gana Parishad.
