= Tyagbir Hem Baruah College =

Coordinates: 26.7334°N 92.9611°E

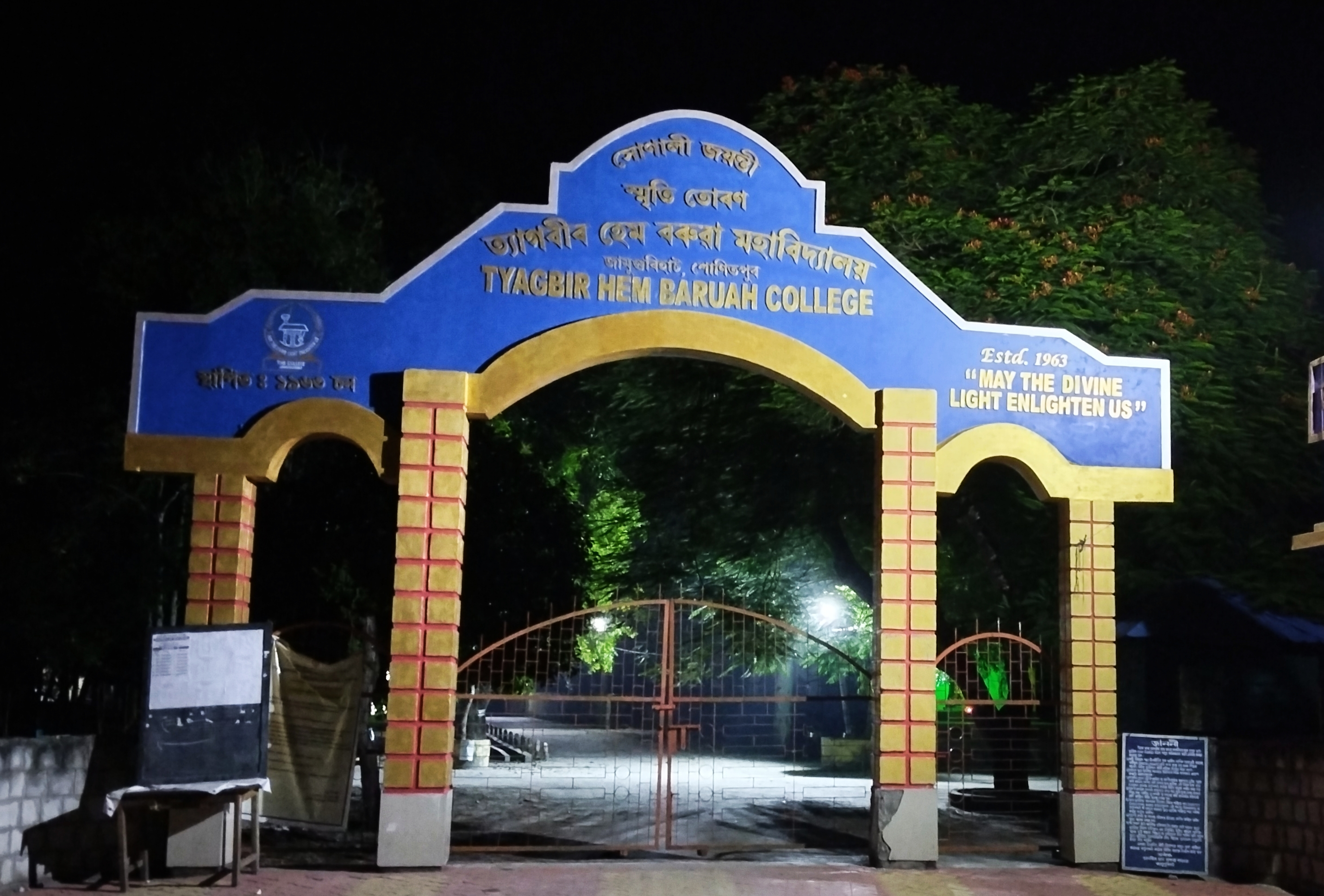
- Motto: "May The Divine Light Enlighten Us"
- Established: 1963 (63 years ago)
- Academic affiliations: Gauhati University
- Principal: Dr. Ajit Hazarika
- Location: Jamugurihat, Assam, India
- Campus: Rural
- Website: www.thbcollege.in

Tyagbir Hem Baruah College is an institution for higher education located in Jamugurihat under Sonitpur district of Assam, India. The college was established in 1963. The college is named after Tyagbir Hem Barua, a noted Indian independence activist, social worker and writer of Assam.

== Geography ==
Tyagbir Hem Baruah College is an institution for higher education. The college was established in 1963.

The college is located at Kusumtola area of Jamugurihat. The campus is surrounded with different kinds of plants, wetlands, ponds, as well as a small tea garden. The college is situated alongside of the N.H.-15. at a distance of 22 km eastward from the District H.Q. Tezpur, and services such as the bank, hospital, post office, and police station, are available nearby

== Courses ==
The college offers the following courses: Two-year higher secondary courses in arts and science under Assam Higher Secondary Education Council, Three-year degree courses in arts and science stream under Gauhati University and U.G.C sponsored career oriented courses are conducted in this college. The college also started Integrated teacher's training programme I.e BA.B.ed and Bsc.B.ed from academic season 2023-24 and MA in English literature from 2024-25.

== Facilities ==
=== Computer Center ===
The Computer Education Center of THB College was started from September 2003.

=== Central Library ===
The Central Library of THB College was set up in 1963 with a collection of about 1,050 books and a few journals.

== Departments ==
=== Science ===
- Zoology
- Mathematics
- Chemistry
- Botany
- Physics
- Statistics

=== Arts ===
- Assamese
- Nepali
- Bodo
- English
- History
- Education
- Economics
- Political Science
- Geography

== See also ==
- Hem Barua
- List of accredited colleges in Assam
