= Pachati =

Pachati or Pasoti, festival is usually celebrated on the fifth day of Janmashtami. The word Pachati generally means a birth ceremony performed on the fifth day after the birth of a child. However, It is the festival celebrated five days after the birth anniversary of the eternal child Krishna. The day after Janmashtami is known as Nandotsav, This is because a festival was held at Nanda Puri on that day. Panchati is the next festival to Nandotsav. In some places, the festival is celebrated on the day after Nandotsav.

== Background ==
The festival of the five mothers. There are many signs of drama and bhaona. Its heroine is Jashoda. Gargamuni, Putna, Gopa- Gopi are the side characters. The woman who plays the role of Yashoda needs to be on a vow. He sits on the side of the stage with his son. Six little girls come to the arena with rice, and ladoos in their hands, they make a circle around Yashoda and sprinkle them on her head. Nanda Jaya once accepted a fruit from a circumambulating gopi and offered it to Krishna. As soon as Gargamuni enters with books in his hands, the women start sprinkling water on Krishna's body. This is the end of the Panchati festival. Putnabadh is the attraction of this part.

== History ==
There are two plays in old Assamese literature based on the Pachati festival. There's. One is by Dwij Ramakant of Kaharjar (Jhar) village in Upper Mouza of Kamrup. The influence of the "Addya Dasham" in the play is indelible. The second is by Madhav Dutta. The play is about the birth of Krishna, the praise of the divine Vasudeva, the birth anniversary and the killing of Putana. The Panchati festival is celebrated with great pomp in the satras of Assam.

Atul Chandra Hazarika explains that the term "Pachati" signifies a ritual carried out five days after a child's birth. This Pacati event is a celebration dedicated to celestial infants possessing divine abilities. The festival takes place on the fifth day of Janmashtami, which marks the birth of infant Lord Krishna.
