= Matehal =

- Khyber Pakhtunkhwa
- Country: Pakistan
- Region: Khyber-Pakhtunkhwa
- District: Mansehra District
- Time zone: UTC+5 (PST)

Matehal is a village in the Khyber Pakhtunkhwa province of Pakistan. Matehal is situated in a valley located at the boundary area of the Mansehra district and the Abbottabad district, west from the Karakurram highway at approximately 3 kilometres (1.9 mi) west of the Qalanderabad, a city well-known in the world by its local dish Known as Chapli Kabab. It is a village of Union Council Behali and village Council Rehar. Awans, Qureshis, tanolis are the major tribes of Matehal. This valley is surrounded by the mountains from all sides.

== Etymology ==
Matehal is named after a Hindu named Mati who first came to this village before the arrival of the muslim tribes. The Hindus were in the majority at this time but later on muslim population grew and hindus migrated to India during partition leaving Matehal 100% Sunni Muslim.

== History ==
Matehal was a multi-cultural village because of the Hindus and Muslims. All the trade was under the custody of Hindus. The muslim population worked in agriculture and also in the Indian Army. Some of the brave soldiers from Matehal assisted the war effort in WWI. In 1947, Pakistan came into existence forcing Hindus to migrate to India.

== Education ==
Matehal has four primary and two middle government schools, serving as source of education for the local villagers who eagerly quench their thirst for education. Moreover, there is one private primary school in the village. As far as high school or college is concerned, there are no opportunities available. Students must travel to Behali or Qalanderabad for secondary education. School in Behali was established by Turks in 1872 which was first ever school in Mansehra district.
