= Nadaur Assembly constituency =

Coordinates: 26.74°N 93.04°E

Sootea
- Constituency No. 75 for the Assam Legislative Assembly

Constituency details
- Country: India
- Region: Northeast India
- State: Assam
- District: Sonitpur
- Lok Sabha constituency: Tezpur
- Established: 1962
- Reservation: None

Member of Legislative Assembly
- 16th Assam Legislative Assembly
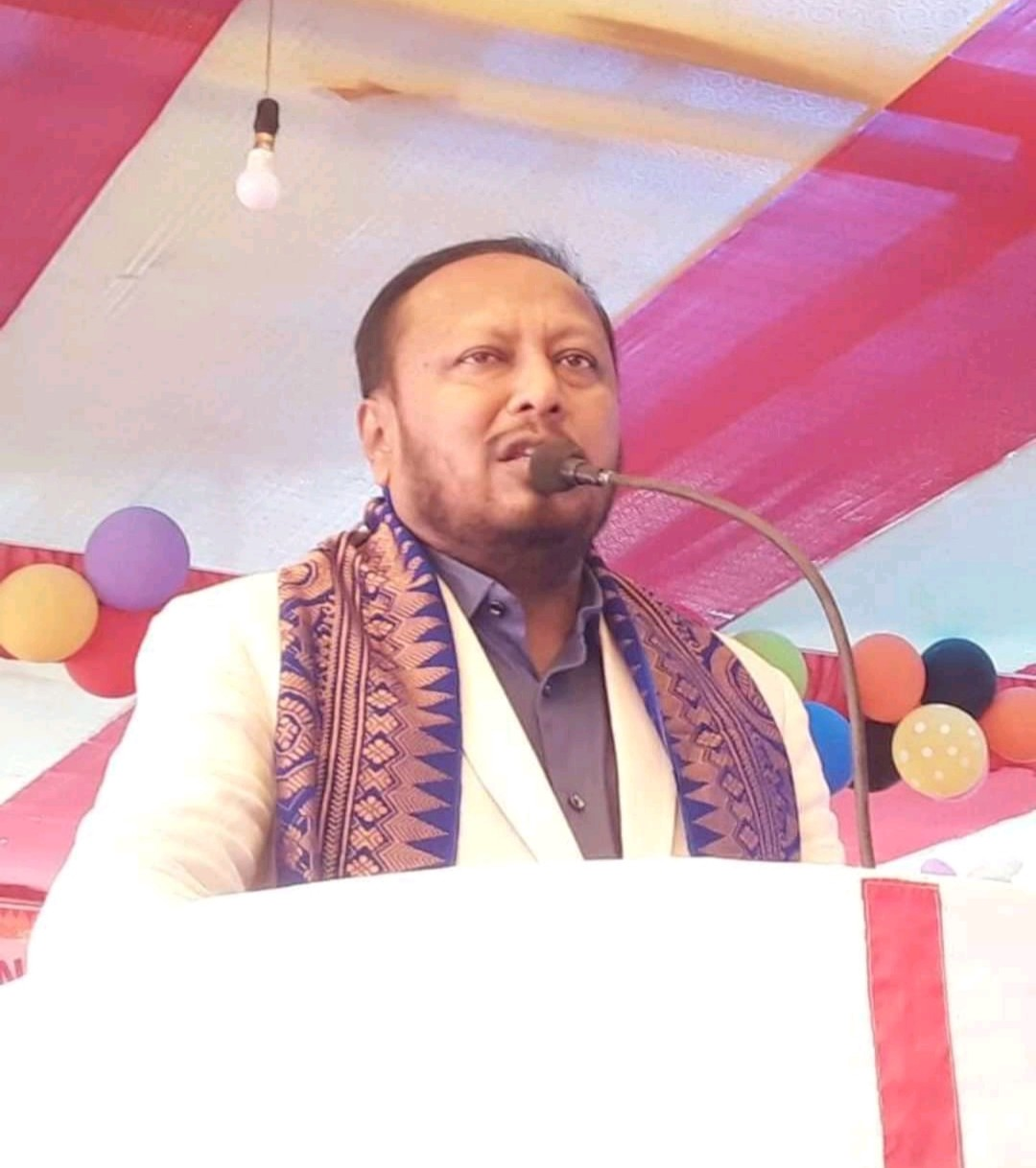
- Incumbent Padma Hazarika
- Party: BJP
- Elected year: 2021

Most Successful parties from Sootea Vidhan Sabha
1. INC (5 Times) (41.0%)
2. AGP (3 Times) (25.0%)
3. BJP (2 Times) (16.0%)
4. JP (1 Time) (8.00%)
5. Ind (1 Time) (8.00%)

Sootea Assembly constituency was one of the 126 assembly constituencies of Assam Legislative Assembly. Sootea formed part of the Tezpur Lok Sabha constituency. This constituency was renamed to Nadaur in 2023.

== Members of Legislative Assembly ==
| Election | Member | Party |
|---|---|---|
| 1962 | Bijoy Chandra Bhagavati | Indian National Congress |
| 1967 | Narayan Chandra Bhuyan | Indian National Congress |
| 1972 | Swarna Probha Mahanta | Indian National Congress |
| 1978 | Golak Kakati | Janata Party |
| 1985 | Robin Saikia | Independent politician |
| 1991 | Kushal Sahu | Indian National Congress |
| 1996 | Padma Hazarika | Asom Gana Parishad |
| 2001 | Praneswar Basumatari | Indian National Congress |
| 2006 | Padma Hazarika | Asom Gana Parishad |
| 2011 | Padma Hazarika | Asom Gana Parishad |
| 2016 | Padma Hazarika | Bharatiya Janata Party |
| 2021 | Padma Hazarika | Bharatiya Janata Party |

== Election results ==
=== 2026 ===
2026 Assam Legislative Assembly election: Nadaur
| Party | Candidate | Votes | % | ±% |
|---|---|---|---|---|
| BJP | Padma Hazarika | 111125 | 64.55 | |
| INC | Sunil Chetry | 58209 | 33.81 | |
| NOTA | NOTA | 2812 | 1.63 | |
| Margin of victory | | 52916 | | |
| Turnout | | 172146 | | |
| Rejected ballots | | | | |
| Registered electors | | | | |
| | | Swing | | |

=== 2021 ===
2021 Assam Legislative Assembly election: Sootea
| Party | Candidate | Votes | % | ±% |
|---|---|---|---|---|
| BJP | Padma Hazarika | 84,807 | 56.50 | +1.06 |
| INC | Praneswar Basumatary | 60,432 | 40.26 | −4.25 |
| NOTA | None of the above | 2,411 | 1.61 | +0.14 |
| Majority | | 24,375 | | |
| Turnout | | 1,50,091 | | |
| Registered electors | | | | |
| BJP hold | | Swing | | |

=== 2016 ===
2016 Assam Legislative Assembly election: Sootea
| Party | Candidate | Votes | % | ±% |
|---|---|---|---|---|
| BJP | Padma Hazarika | 60,440 | 45.89 | |
| INC | Praneswar Basumatary | 58,622 | 44.51 | |
| CPI(M) | Khemraj Chetry | 4,914 | 3.73 | |
| Independent | Jyoti Subba | 2,484 | 1.88 | |
| Independent | Mahendra Urang | 2,112 | 1.60 | |
| Independent | Arun Nath | 1,189 | 0.90 | |
| NOTA | None of the above | 1,941 | 1.47 | |
| Majority | | 1,818 | 1.38 | |
| Turnout | | 1,31,702 | 82.95 | |
| Registered electors | | 1,58,765 | | |
| BJP gain from AGP | | Swing | | |

== See also ==
- Sootea
- Tezpur
- List of constituencies of Assam Legislative Assembly
