= Behali, Pakistan =

Coordinates: 34°15′N 73°10′E

Bahali Behali
- Union council and town
- Interactive map of Bahali
- Country: Pakistan
- Region: Khyber-Pakhtunkhwa
- District: Mansehra District
- Villages: Matehal, Rehar, Karer, Behali (Head office of Union Council), Ogra, Hussanian, Potha, Matihaal
- Time zone: UTC+5 (PST)

Bahali
- Union Council
- Interactive map of Bahali
- Country: Pakistan
- Province: Khyber-Pakhtunkhwa

Population (200000)
  - Total: 200,000

Bahali is a village and union council (an administrative subdivision) of the Mansehra District in Khyber-Pakhtunkhwa province of Pakistan. Bahali is part of Mansehra Tehsil and is located at the boundary area of the Mansehra district and the Abbottabad district, west from the Karakurram highway at Qalanderabad. It is a valley surrounded by mountains. It is inhabited by Turks of Behali, Tanolies, Awan and Raja's.

== See also ==
- Imperial Gazetteer of India, volume
- Behali Ki Tareekh by Raja Khursheed
- Ain-e-Akbari
- Tareekh e Farishta
- Land Revenue Record
