= Buka Bhaona =

Indigenous festival sport in India

Buka Bhaona (transl. Mud pretense), also known as Pekjatra, is a special bhaona held in conjunction with the Nandotsav on the occasion of Krishna Janmashtami. The event is being held at Puronigudam in Nagaon district and Jamugurihat in Sonitpur district respectively. There are also many others in Barpeta, Majuli, Charaideu and other areas.

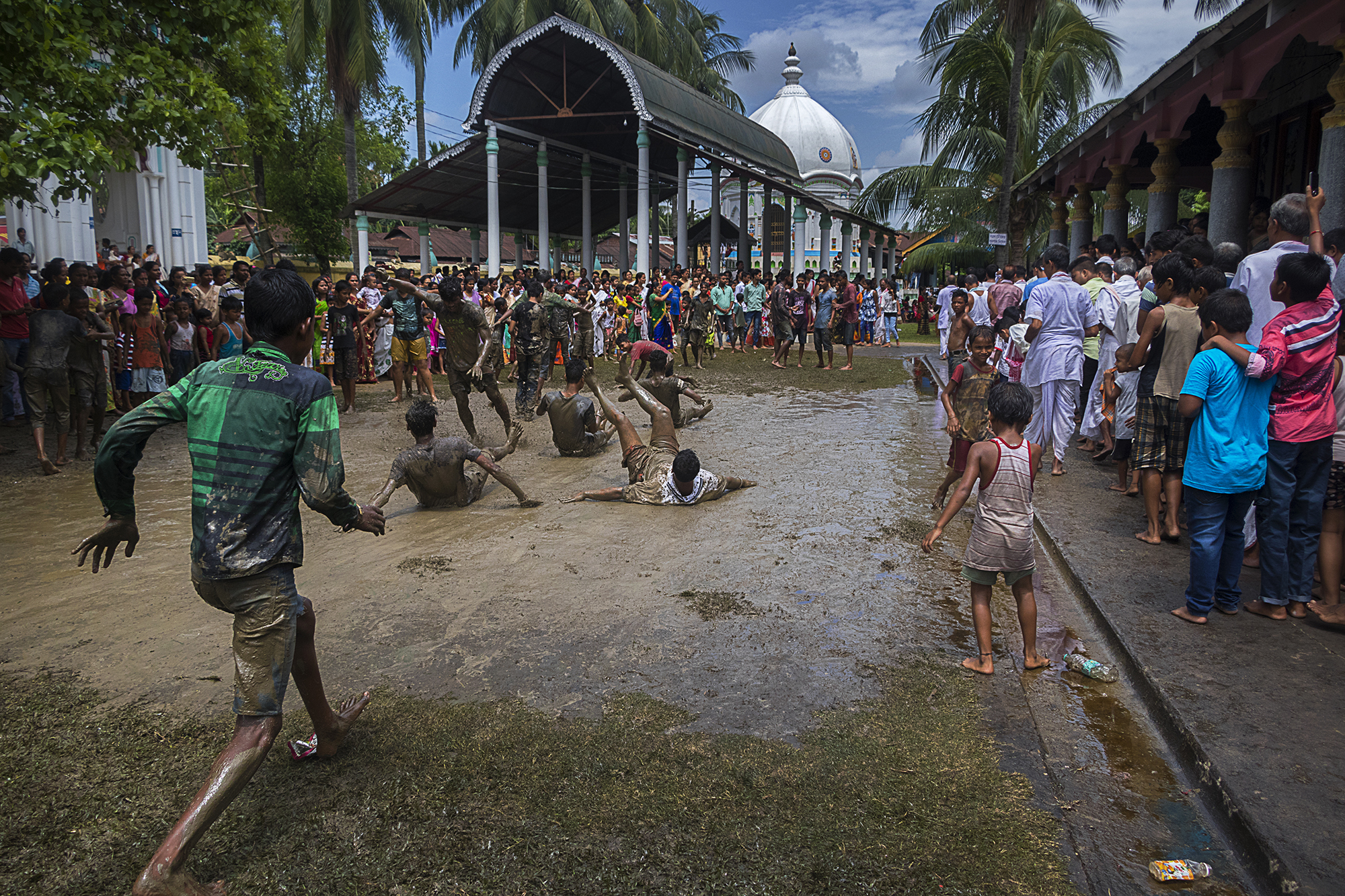
Boka Bhaona held in Barpeta

== Etymology ==
The tradition of Boka Bhaona is associated with the story of the joy in Gokul at the time of the birth of Krishna. It is believed that the road to Gokul became muddy and slippery due to heavy rains during the birth of Krishna and the butter, honey and oil brought by the devotees who went to see Krishna at the house of Nandaraja the next day. In this sense, the birth of Krishna is celebrated by symbolically pulling mud.

== Rituals of Observance ==
The festival is celebrated mainly in the customs of the Mahapurushia through Nam-Prasang and Bhaona culture. Women usually do not participate in the mud-throwing ceremony, but both men and women are involved in the main ceremony. It is customary to artificially muddy a piece of mud and pour butter and honey on it. The devotees first circumambulate the mud pond, offer obeisances and throw mud at each other. There are many different types of mud that are collected from the people who come to see the bhaona.
