= Namghar =

Assamese place for congregational worship

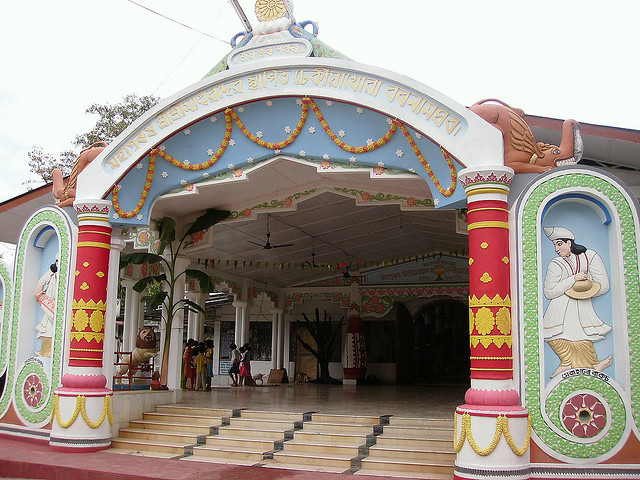
Dhekiakhowa Bornamghar at Jorhat

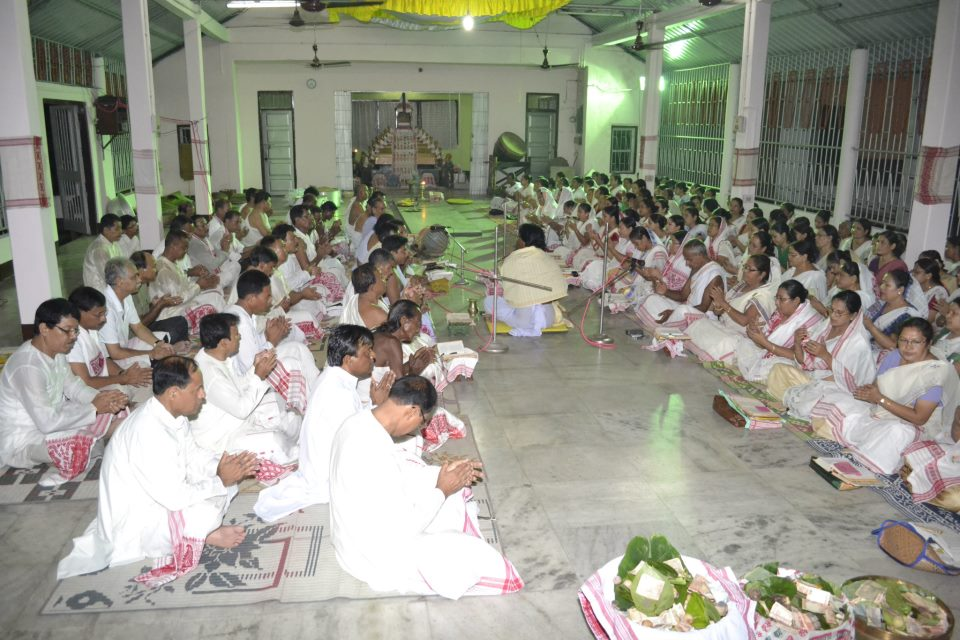
Inside a Namghar during Janmashtami

Namghar (lit. 'prayer house') is a place for congregational worship associated with the entire Assamese community and the Ekasarana sect of Hinduism, in particular, that is native to Assam. Besides frming the primary structure used for worship, they also function as meeting houses for congregations, as well as theaters for dramatic performances (bhaona). The Namghar, also called the kirtanghar, is also the central structure in the Sattras (monasteries of the Ekasarana dharma) where the other buildings are positioned around it. Namghars are widespread in Assam, and very often more than one namghar exists in a single village, signifying many congregational communities.

Namghars were introduced in Assam by the Vaishnavite saints Damodardev, Madhavdev and Sankaradeva for Assamese people where they can culture and practice naam (devotional songs) and Bhakti of God (devotion). He established the first Naamghar at Bordowa in Nagaon district.

There is a Namghar in Puri as well, near the Jagannath Temple.

== Functions ==
=== Social activities ===
Namghars are used for educational, political, cultural and developmental activities and discussions undertaken in a democratic manner.

== Bibliography ==
- Cantlie, Audrey (1984), The Assamese, London
- Neog, Maheshwar (1980). Early History of the Vaishnava Faith and Movement in Assam. Delhi: Motilal Banarasidass.

== See also ==
- Athkheliya_Namghar
