= Dekargaon railway station =

Railway station in Assam, India

Dekargaon
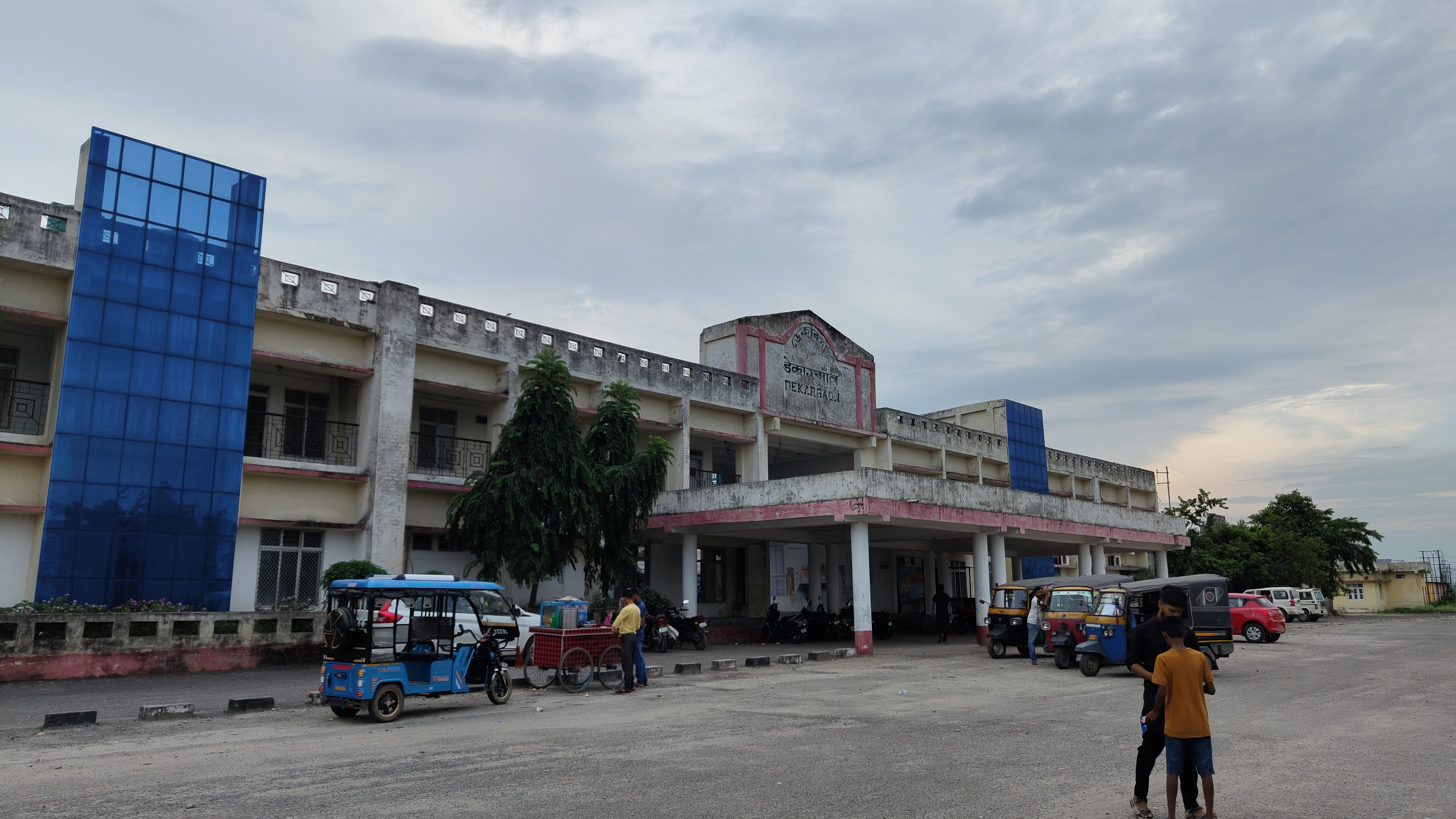

General information
- Location: NH 52, Dekargaon, Tezpur, Sonitpur district, Assam; India
- Coordinates: 26.6806°N 92.7631°E
- Elevation: 73 metres (240 ft)
- System: Indian Railways station
- Owner: Indian Railways
- Operator: Northeast Frontier Railway
- Platforms: 3
- Tracks: 5

Other information
- Status: Functioning
- Station code: DKGN
- Zone(s): Northeast Frontier Railway zone
- Division(s): Rangiya

History
- Opened: 4 January 2014; 12 years ago
Location
- Location within Assam Location within India

Dekargaon Railway Station is a railway station located in Sonitpur district of Assam, India.

It is about 10 km (6.2 mi) away from the Tezpur city of Sonitpur district of Assam and about 1 km away from Tezpur Airport. The railway station was opened on 4 January 2014. It provides connectivity from Tezpur town to the rest of India.
