= Jamugurihat =

Jamugurihat Jamuguri
- Town
- Location in Assam, India
- Coordinates: 26.73°N 92.93°E
- Country: India
- State: Assam
- District: Sonitpur
- Established: 15 August 2017

Government
  - Type: Town Committee
  - Body: Jamugurihat Town Committee

Area
  - Total: 20 km^{2} (7.7 sq mi)
- Elevation: 73 m (240 ft)

Population (2001)
  - Total: 19,743
  - Density: 990/km^{2} (2,600/sq mi)

Languages
  - Official: Assamese
- Time zone: UTC+5:30 (IST)
- Postal code: 784180-84

Jamugurihat is a town and a town area committee in Sonitpur district, in the Indian state of Assam. This is a newly planned city area by the Urban Development Authority of Assam. The town is located north of the Brahmaputra River. It is the location of the 200-year-old Baresahariya Bhaona festival.

== Geography ==
Jamugurihat is located on the north bank of the Brahmaputra River, 184 kilometres (114 mi) from Guwahati, the capital of Assam, and 17 kilometres (11 mi) east of Tezpur. Agriculture and allied occupation constitute the rural economy besides a large chunk of people engaged in tea cultivation. Jamugurihat is a newly planned city with a population of 19,743 (according to the 2011 Census) and 52 villages with different communities like Assamese, Nepali, Bengali etc. with different religions. In Jamugurihat there are more than 60 Namghar and temples. In Jamugurihat, approximately 15% of people are doing Govt. Services, 35% of people are doing some different types of business and another 50% of people are depending on different types of Agriculture. Jamugurihat lies between Kani Dekorai and Jiya Bhoroli River. Sijusa Picnic spot is situated at the northern part of Jamugurihat and the 6th edition of Kaziranga is extended up to Panpur the southern part of Jamugurihat.

=== Climate ===
Jamugurihat has a moderate to warm climate in summer and with cooler temperatures in the winter months. The temperature during the period would be 18 to 23 degrees C. The climate makes Jamugurihat a very good place for various types of agriculture.

== Educational Institute ==
Jamugurihat has more than 200 no's Govt. L.P. School, 20 no's Govt. M.E. School, 8 no's of Govt. High School and 4No's Govt. Higher Secondary Schools. Some English medium private sector schools are also available in this area. Jamuguri Higher Secondary School is Estd. In the year 1925 and situated Near NH-52 (Now named as NH-15) and 1.5 km. from Jamugurihat main Centre which is the oldest school of this area. In Jamugurihat have only one Govt college name is Tyagbir Hem Baruah College. Tyagbir Hem Baruah College established in 1963 is the only institute of higher education in the greater Naduar area. Situated in the picturesque surroundings alongside the NH-52.and 3 km. east side from Jamugurihat main Centre in the Sonitpur district, the college is named after Hem Barua (Tyagbir)(1893-1945) a renowned freedom fighter of the freedom movement of India. Born to Gopal ch. Baruah and Padmawati Baruah at Tezpur. Hem Baruah offered his public service as G.S. to the Cotton College Student 'Union' president of the Golaghat convention of the Assam Chatra Sanmilan (1919) and took part actively in the Freedom Movement and went to jail for six months in 1921. He was elected Secretary of the Assam pradesh Congress Committee 1922 and went again to jail in 1930 & 1933. The people of Jamugurihat dedicated their only institute of higher learning, Tyagbir Hem Baruah College in the memory of this great and honest freedom fighter of the state. The college has been playing a vital role in providing higher education to the students of Naduar area since inception. The college imparts both Science and Arts faculties.

== Culture of Jamugurihat ==
Jamugurihat is the town of Assamese culture. This place is specially known for the famous cultural monument Baresahariya Bhaona, Borpukhuripar Mukoli Bihu, Bokakhesa Bhaona at Patalarchuk, kuchgaonor kalio Domon Bhowna etc.

== Borpukhuripar Mukoli Bihu ==
Bihu (Assamese: বিহু) denotes a set of three different cultural festivals of Assam and is celebrated by the Assamese diasporas around the world. Though they owe their origins to ancient rites and practices, they have taken definite urban features and have become popular festivals in urban and commercialized milieus in the recent decades. One includes the Assamese New Year celebrated in April. Bihu is also used to imply Bihu dance and Bihu folk songs. The Rongali Bihu or the Bohag Bihu is an important festival of Assam. The most important festivals of Assam are the Bihus, celebrated passionately by all Assamese people irrespective of caste, creed, and belief.

Jamugurihat is also famous for its Bihu. The famous bihu of Jamugurihat is Borpukhuripar Mukoli bihu. People of Jamugurihat celebrate the Borpukhuripar Mukholi Bihu very responsively. This festival is held every year in the month of April. This festival is arranged by a bihu committee in an open field. This field is situated at 3 km. South east from Jamuguri center. More than 30 Bihu groups participate in this festival at a time from different places of Assam.

== Kaliadomon Bhowna ==
Jamugurihat is famous for Bhawna. All villagers of this area celebrated the bhawna in memories of Mahapurush Shankardeva and Mahapurush Madhabdeva. Another most popular Bhowna in jamugurihat is Kochgaon Kaliadomon bhowna which is held on every year of Shankardeva Tithi at Kochgaon Namghar. It is situated north side of Jamugurihat and distance 2.5 km. from Jamugurihat Centre. The Bhowna is very faithfully observed by villagers and all the devotees in Jamugurihat.

== Buka Khesa Bhowna ==
Another popular cultural event in Jamugurihat is Buka Khesa Bhowna which is every year held on the west side 3 km. from Jamugurihat Centre in the village of Patalarchuk. In this year, the Bhowna is successfully completed more than 270 years. This Bhowna is different from another types of Bhownas. In this Bhowna, the people of the Patalarchuk village make a pond and mix water, Panchamrit and soil and make into mud, the villagers then go inside the pond and play the Bhowna, in the auspicious occasion of Lord Shri Krishna Janmastami where they throw the mud to each other.

== Sights of Jamugurihat ==
=== Pithaguri Dol ===
It is situated in Karchantola Area. As per historical observation in the past, this dol was built with Pithaguri (Rice Powder).

=== Sukan Pukhuri ===
The term Sukan means dry and Pukhuri means pond in Assamese language. Thus, it means Dry Pond and as the name suggests the pond has no water in it. It was dug by king Amaritta.

=== Hukai Pukhuri ===
This is another historical pond of Jamugurihat which is situated in Gamiripal, Sonitpur. This pond was dug by Hukai Bhuyan for his daughters for bathing.

=== Shukleswar Dewalaya ===
It was built by King Rudrasingha situated in Kochgaon.

=== Baneswar Dewalaya ===
The Baneswar Temple or Devaloya is a temple dedicated to Lord Shiva. It was also built by King Rudrasingha at Ahom Era. It is situated in the village Bahboria Gaon [Jamugurihat].

=== Bura Gosain Dewalaya ===
It was also built by King Rudrasingha at Ahom Era. It is situated in Nandikeswar gaon.

=== Norowa Than ===
Located at Dhekerigaon, near Karchantola. Years ago the Mahapurush Shankardeva trained baishnavi culture to bhaktas. There is the oldest well in the area, which was used by Shankardeva for drinking water.

== Cultural Centre of Jamugurihat ==
=== Bapuji Bhawan Natya Samaj ===
Bapuji Bhawan Natya Samaj is a Society of Jamugurihat which is situated at Near Evening daily Market and in front of Jamuguri Govt. Hospital. This bhawan has a committee who are care the bhawan. They are arranged some drammer and other programme in this Bhawan.

=== Abhijatri Kala Kendra ===
It is the main Cultural Institute of Jamugurihat. It is situated at the main centre of Jamugurihat side of National Highway 15 (India) and in front of P.W.D. Bungalow Jamugurihat. Abhijatri Kala Kendra trained the students of Jamugurihat in various cultures like Satriya Nitya, Vocal, Drama, Art etc. which develop the students in cultural line.

=== Shankari Kala kristi vikash Kendra ===
An institute relates with Shankari Sanskriti Established by Srimanta Sankardev Sangha (Jamugurihat Branch) is situated nearby Jamuguri Higher Secondary school.

=== Abhilash Kala Kendra ===
It is a branch of Abhiyatri Kala Kendra and presently the branch is temporarily doing its activities in Fine Arts, Vocal in North Jamuguri M.E girls high school. Till now, the branch has not got any Govt Aid to establish a permanent training center for hundreds of students/children.

=== Acting Academy ===
This academy was established in Dhalaibil centre few years ago by an ambitious youth group to make a good environment of Acting Art. The academy basically worked for one act drama and participates in one act drama competition in various parts of India every year and has been awarded many times by judge. Sisir Borthakur, a cultural worker, who is now the Chairman of this Institution.

=== Jagadhatri Temple Bamunbari ===
It is present in the region for more than 120 years.

== Business ==
It is a favorable place for businessmen. Jamugurihat has a business union Estd. In 1975, its name was Jamuguri Merchant Association and now it is known as Jamuguri Business Union. In Jamugurihat centre have more than 200nos of shop in different types. A weekly market is going on every Thursday, where different types of businessmen come from different places like Tezpur, Balipara, Biswanath chariali etc. The villagers of backward side of Jamugurihat like Kathpura, Laletapu, Gamiripal, Sonitpur, depend on this market whose main income source is agriculture. They come to this market for selling their agricultural yields.

== Govt. & Semi Govt. Organization ==
Many government offices are available in Jamugurihat. Jamugurihat has a police station near the Jamuguri centre, which also cares Jamugurian people. A fire station is available in Jamugurihat. It is situated on the back side of Jamuguri Higher Secondary School, which served to help the big area of Jamugurihat every time. Jamugurihat has one Government Hospital with 30 bed capacity. Jamugurihat has 5 nationalized banks that always care the people from financial transaction. One main post office and 3 sub post offices are also available in Jamugurihat. One branch of State Bank of India is newly established bank in Jamugurihat.

== See also ==
- Sonitpur district
- Tezpur
- Rangachakua
- Buka Bhaona
