= Sonitpur district =

- District of Assam
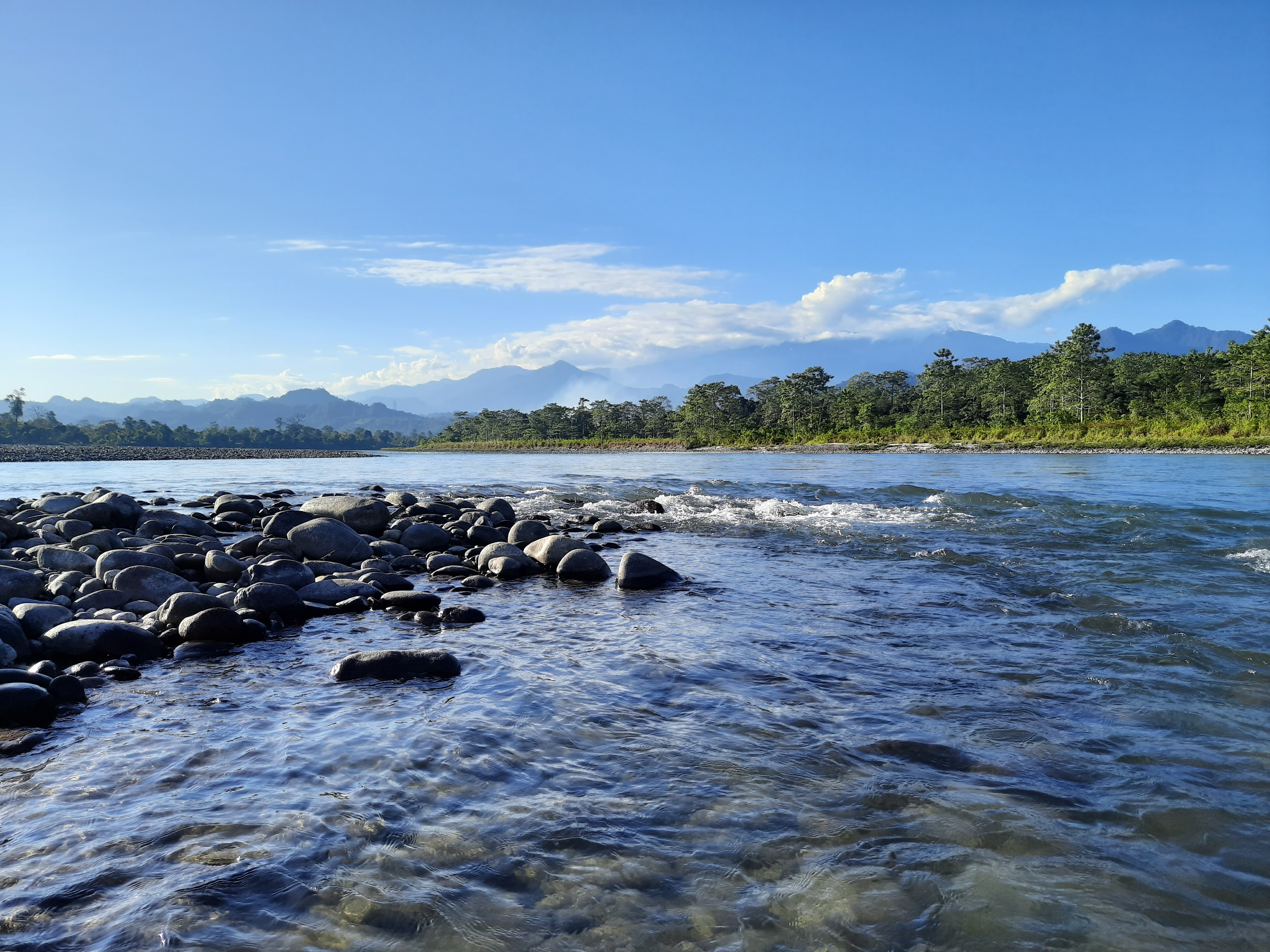
- Kameng River in Nameri National Park with Himalayas in background

- Location in Assam
- Country: India
- State: Assam
- Division: North Assam
- Headquarters: Tezpur

Government
  - Lok Sabha constituencies: Sonitpur
  - Vidhan Sabha constituencies: Barchalla, Tezpur, Rangapara, Sootea

Area
  - Total: 2,076.70 km^{2} (801.82 sq mi)
- Elevation: 48–560 m (157–1,837 ft)

Population (2011)
  - Total: 1,311,619
  - Density: 631.588/km^{2} (1,635.81/sq mi)

Languages
  - Official: Assamese
- Time zone: UTC+5:30 (IST)
- ISO 3166 code: IN-AS
- Vehicle registration: AS12
- Website: sonitpur.assam.gov.in

Sonitpur district [Pron: ˌsə(ʊ)nɪtˈpʊə or ˌʃə(ʊ)nɪtˈpʊə] is an administrative district in the state of Assam in India. The district headquarters is located at Tezpur.

== Etymology ==
The name of the district is derived from a story found in Hindu epics specifically the Bhagavata Purana and in the locally composed Kalika Purana where the city was established by Banasura the eldest son of Bali who did great penance or tapasya to Lord Shiva who promised to look over the city. The Sanskrit word Śōṇita means blood. The etymology of Tezpur, the headquarter of this district is also based on the story.

== History ==
=== Duars ===
Sonitpur district falls under the Darrang Duars which includes the region between the Bornadi River and Dhansiri River.

=== Trade and relation with Tibet ===
According to Tibetan chronicles, the ruler of Darrang (now Sonitpur district) used to pay tribute to Wongme Palder the ruler of Thembang (now West Kameng district, Arunachal Pradesh) who was a descendant of an exiled Tibetan prince named Lhase Tsangma, brother of Tibetan ruler Ralpacan in the 9th century C.E. The Koriapar Dooar falls under the Sonitpur district and was held by Bhutias known as the Monpas (Tibetan: མོན་པ་) and to the Chinese as Monbas. These chiefs were subordinate to the ruler of Tawang, who in turn were a tributary to the Tibetan government at Lhasa.

Koriapar Dooar under Sonitpur district acted as a trading point between Assam and Tibet.

Under Ahom government, the management was under the Sat Rajas and revenue was collected by an officer called Sanzati.

The Tibetan government at Lhasa appointed Tibetan officials called Gellongs to supervise the local Monpa chief. The Monpa chief who looked after the Duar were called Tsorgon. This office was created in the 16th-century.

It was occupied by the Baro-Bhuyan feudal lords in the 14th century.

The Koriapar Dooars was annexed by British East India Company in 1844 and added to the Assam province.

=== 16th century ===
In the 16th century, the eastern part of the district, up to the Kameng River, was conquered by the Ahoms. In 1523, they deported a large number of Chutia families to a place on the east bank of the Kameng. In 1532, they defeated a Mughal Empire army sent against them at the banks of the Kameng.

Starting in the 16th century, under the reign of Nara Narayan, the Koch kingdom expanded to a great extent. Several years after the Ahom victory at the Kameng, Nara Narayan sacked the Ahom capital at Gargaon and forced the Ahoms to pay tribute. Its eastern conquests were completed by Raghudev, the nephew of the king and heir as Nara Narayan had no son. However eventually one of Nara Nayaran's queens gave birth to a child, Lakshmi Narayan. Raghudev rebelled, supported by the Ahoms, but was eventually defeated. In response Nara Narayan gave Koch territory east of the Sankosh River to Raghudev and the rest to Lakshmi Narayan. Raghudev's kingdom became known as Koch Hajo, and quickly fell under Ahom hegemony, while the western Koch Bihar kingdom fell under Mughal influence. Koch Hajo's boundary with the Ahoms was at the Kameng River, also known as the Bareli, which flowed through the middle of what is now Sonitpur district.

Soon war broke out between Raghudev and Lakshmi Narayan. Lakshmi Narayan was defeated and appealed to the Mughals for help. The Mughals sent a large force and defeated Raghudev, although Sonitpur was on the eastern boundary and so was not conquered. Raghudev's brother Bali Narayan then fled to his Ahom overlords for help, and when the Mughals demanded his return, the Ahoms refused. This led to several wars between the Ahoms and Mughals, most of which were in lower Assam. In 1615, a Mughal army advanced as far as the Kameng, but was soon defeated on both land and water. In 1637, the Mughals defeated and killed Bali Narayan and in the treaty that followed, the entirety of Sonitpur came into Ahom possession. During the chaos that followed the death of Shah Jahan in 1658, the Ahoms tried to push their boundary to the Sankosh River but were pushed back by Mir Jumla, who captured Gargaon. On their advance, the Mughals took a fort near Silghat while the Ahoms evacuated the Chandara fort near Tezpur. However the rains that set in during their retreat, as well as the diseases, took a huge toll on the Mughal army, and the Ahoms soon took back Guwahati and kept it.

The rajas of Darrang quickly became reduced in territory to a small area around Mangaldoi. In 1792, the Moamoria rebellion broke out, and fighting soon ensured the entirety of Ahom territory fell into anarchy. Several outside kingdoms, including Manipur, attempted to send help but could not do much. The Moamorias raised an Ahom prince to kingship, and in 1786 conquered Rangpur, the Ahom capital. The Ahom raja Gaurinath Singh was forced to flee. While the Ahoms were beset by the Moamoria rebellion, the Darrang raja and a descendant of Bali Narayan, Krishna Narayan, tried to reassert their independence with the help of Bengali mercenaries. However, in 1792, a British force sent to help the Ahom kings managed to take back Guwahati and defeated Krishna Narayan. In 1794, they retook Rangpur. However much of the kingdom was still only under weak Ahom control, and subject to constant raids from the surrounding hill-tribes like the Nyishis. In 1818, the Burmese invaded to restore their preferred monarch on the throne, and forced out the Ahom king and took over his land. The Burmese occupation of Assam resulted in massive death and destruction. In 1826, the British declared war on Myanmar and defeated them in the first Anglo-Burmese War. In the subsequent Treaty of Yandabo, the territory came under British control.

Darrang, including present-day Sonitpur district, became a separate district in 1833, and the capital was shifted to Tezpur in 1835.

The British introduced tea plantation to the district, and imported large numbers of labourers from the tribal belt of Chota Nagpur Plateau to the Sonitpur area.

== Administration ==
- Headquarters: Tezpur
- Number of Revenue Circles/Tehsils
- Number of Mouza: 26
- Number of Community Development(C.D.) Blocks: 17
- Number of Police Stations: 11
- No. of Anchalik Panchayats: 7
- Name of Gaon Panchayats: 158
- Number of Villages: 1615 (including 19 under BTAD)
- Number of Towns: 6
- Names of Towns: Tezpur, Dhekiajuli, Rangapara & Jamugurihat
- Number of Municipality Board: 2
- Number of Town Committees: 4
- Number of Police District: 1 (Sonitpur Police District)

== Geography ==
Sonitpur district lies on the plains between the foothills of the Himalayas and the valley of the Brahmaputra which forms its southern border. Sonitpur district had the second largest area of districts in Assam, after Karbi Anglong district, at 5,324 square kilometres (2,056 sq mi), comparable in size to the island of Guadalcanal. Other than the Brahmaputra, the major rivers in the district are its right tributaries and include the Jiabharali, Gabharu, Borgang and Buroi.

=== National protected area ===
Sonitpur District is home to several wildlife sanctuaries and national parks. In 1998, Sonitpur district became home to Nameri National Park in the north, which has an area of 200 km^{2} (77.2 mi^{2}). It is also home to Orang National Park, which it shares with Darrang district. Orang National Park was established in 1999 and has an area of 79 km^{2} (30.5 mi^{2}).

Sonitpur is home to two wildlife sanctuaries: Burachapori Wildlife Sanctuary and Sonai Rupai Wildlife Sanctuary. It is also home to the registered forests (RF) of Behali RF (140 km^{2}), Naduar RF (69 km^{2}), and Charduar RF (260 km^{2}).

=== Climate ===
Sonitpur District falls in the Sub-Tropical Rainforest climate region, (Af) in Koppen's climate classification and enjoys Hot & Wet type of climate. Summers are hot and humid; with an average temperature of 27 °C. Rainfall is heavy above 3,000 mm (9 ft) in wet months January to June which is both a boon and a bane for the people. A boon, for it, provides natural irrigation to the fields; and a bane, as it causes the rivers to overflow their banks and cause floods. All months have average precipitation of at least 60 mm and the average temperature of the cold month is above 18 °C. As anyone can expect, Tropical rainforest is the vegetation in and around the city.

=== Flora and fauna ===
The forests of Sonitpur district are semi-evergreen forests, moist deciduous forests and bamboo forests, with hydrophytes in the wetlands. Species include: Aegle marmelos, Albizia procera, Alstonia scholaris, Arundo donax, Bambusa balcooa, Cynodon dactylon, Dipterocarpus macrocarpus, Duabanga grandiflora, Eichhornia crassipes, Mesua assamica, Melocanna baccifera, Mesua ferrea, Shorea assamica (mekai) and Shorea robusta.

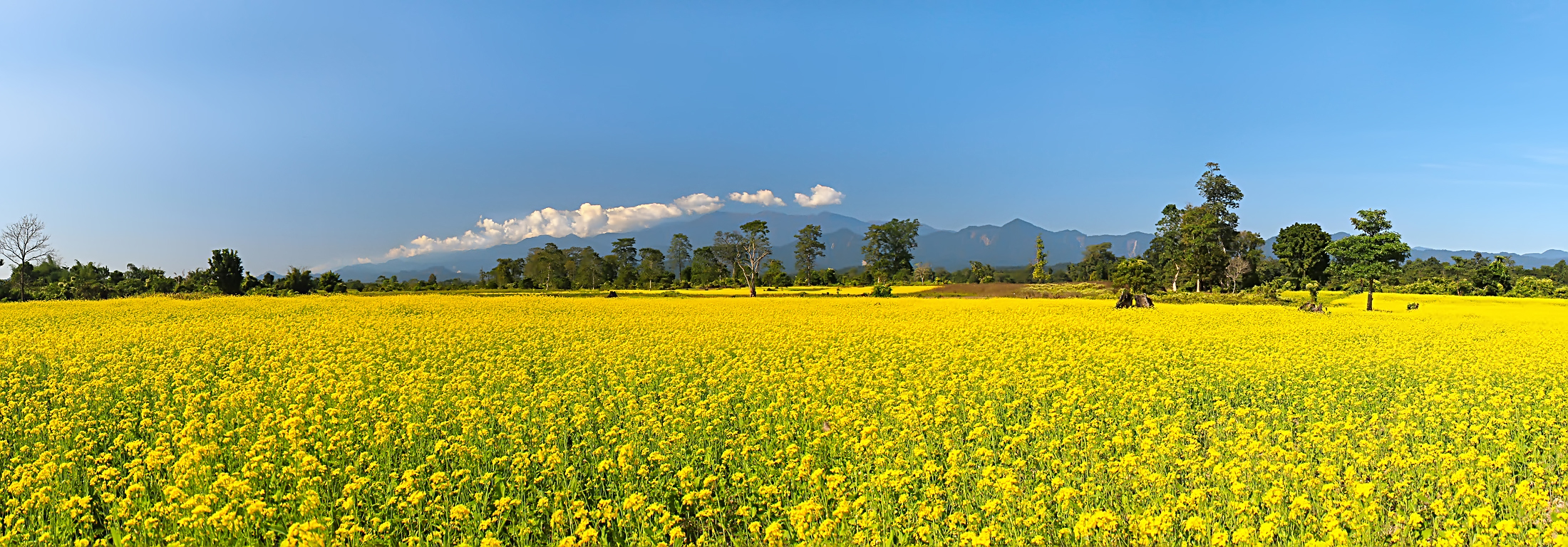
Explore Slana Bari, where the serene Jia Bharali meets nature's beauty in Assam

== Demographics ==
The population of Sonitpur district is 1,924,110 as per 2011 Census. It is the third most populous district of Assam (out of 27), after Nagaon and Dhubri. The demography of Sonitpur district is not entirely homogenous as several linguistic, religious and ethnic communities and groups live in Sonitpur district.

According to the 2011 census Sonitpur district has a population of 1,924,110, roughly equal to the nation of Lesotho or the US state of West Virginia. This gives it a ranking of 245th in India (out of a total of 640). The district has a population density of 365 inhabitants per square kilometre (950/sq mi) . Its population growth rate over the decade 2001-2011 was 15.67%. Sonitpur has a sex ratio of 946 females for every 1000 males, and a literacy rate of 69.96%.

The divided district has a population of 13,11,619, of which 142,477 (10.86%) live in urban areas. Sonitpur has a sex ratio of 950 females per 1000 males. Scheduled Castes and Scheduled Tribes make up 65,367 (4.98%) and 139,033 (10.60%) of the population respectively.

=== Religion ===
Religions in Sonitpur district (2011)
Religion	Percent
Hinduism	69.27%
Islam	22.75%
Christianity	7.30%
Other or not stated	0.68%

The major religions of the populace of Sonitpur district are Hindu and Muslim, As per 2011 census there are approximately 908,565 (69.27%) Hindus and 298,381 (22.75%) Muslims in the district. There are around 95,774 (7.30%) Christians in the district. Other small population following Buddhism (0.5%), Jainism and Sikhism is also present in the district.

=== Ethnic groups and languages ===
Languages in Sonitpur district (2011)
1. Assamese (37.0%)
2. Bengali (19.3%)
3. Sadri (12.5%)
4. Boro (8.93%)
5. Nepali (6.63%)
6. Hindi (3.79%)
7. Odia (2.54%)
8. Mundari (1.98%)
9. Others (7.33%)

Almost 600,000 people in the district are from communities residing in Assam since pre-colonial times, making up around 46% of the population. These are Kalita, Assamese Brahmins, Koch Rajbongshis, Karbi, Keot (Kaibarta), Mising, Nath Jogis, Bodo, Thengal Kachari, Chutia, Rabha, Gorkhas and other communities of Assam. They have become a minority in the district due to the colonial and post-colonial era settlement of communities like Bengalis (both Hindu and Muslim), Biharis, Marwaris etc.

The immigrant Bengali speaking Hindus came from erstwhile undivided Bengal and Bangladesh, as officials and clerks of the British administration and the Tea Industry; and stayed back. Later, on account of the partition of India, Hindu people from Bangladesh coming as refugees added significantly to the community. Their primary language is Bengali, most of them are also fluent in Assamese too. They are mostly urbanised having a sizeable population in towns of Rangapara, Tezpur, Dhekiajuli, Biswanath Chariali, and Balipara. The population of Bengali Hindus is over 100,000 in the district. There has a sizeable population of Bengali Muslims living since colonial times in the district mainly in and around char areas of Brahmaputra river and surrounding areas of Dhekiajuli, Thelamara, and Tezpur (Napam). The population of Bengalis total is now around 250,000 in the district and make up almost 20% of the population.

The third largest community is the Adivasis, or tea garden tribes. Their ancestors were brought from tribal areas of central India to work as labourers on tea plantations. They are now spread all over the district. However, they are mostly concentrated in the surrounding regions of Dhekiajuli, Rangapara, Balipara, Jamugurihat, Biswanath chariali, Behali, Gohpur, Helem and northern parts of the district. They use Sadri, a dialect of Hindi as their first and primary language amongst themselves and Assamese as their second or third language. Around 50,000 still speak their original languages like Mundari and Kurukh. Almost 100,000 of them practices Christianity.

There are nearly 50,000 speakers of Hindi and it's dialect Bhojpuri living in the district who are primarily immigrated into the district from Hindi-speaking regions of India particularly Bihar and Rajasthan.

As per the 2011 census, 37.01% of the population spoke Assamese, 19.36% Bengali, 12.52% Sadri, 8.93% Boro, 6.63% Nepali, 3.79% Hindi, 2.54% Odia and 1.98% Mundari as their first language.

== List of Guardian Ministers ==
Sr No.	Guardian_Minister	Tenure	Party
1.	Pijush Hazarika	2021 Incumbent	Bharatiya Janata Party

== Notable people ==
The district has produced notable people, including:-

- Jyoti Prasad Agarwala (1903–1951) playwright, songwriter, poet, writer and film maker
- Kamalakanta Bhattacharya, Assamese essayist and poet
- Ankushita Boro, boxer
- Jamuna Boro, boxer
- Dr. Bhupen Hazarika, playback singer, poet and film-maker
- Bishnu Prasad Rabha (1909–69), promoter of Assamese culture
- Phani Sarma (1909–70), theatre and film actor, playwright and director

== Transportation ==
- Major Railway Station : Dekargaon, Rangapara & Biswanath Chariali.
- Nearest Airport : Salonibari Airport, Tezpur.
- Assam State Transport Corporation (ASTC) Stand : At the midst of Tezpur town.
