= List of cities and towns in Assam =

The municipal towns of Assam, India are included in the List of Cities and Towns in Assam. The entire work of this article is based on "Census of India", conducted by "The Office of the Registrar General and Census Commissioner, India" under Ministry of Home Affairs, Government of India. According to the data from the Census of 2011, there are 28 districts, 58 sub-divisions and 84 municipal towns in the state of Assam.

District	District H.Q.	Sub-division	Sub-division H.Q.	Towns	Class	Population As per Census 2011
Udalguri	Odalguri	Odalguri	Odalguri	Odalguri	Municipality board	
Udalguri	Odalguri	Bhergaon	Bhergaon	Tangla	Municipality board	
Karimganj	Karimganj	Karimganj	Karimganj	Karimganj	Municipality board	
Karimganj	Karimganj	Karimganj	Karimganj	Badarpur	Town committee	
Cachar	Silchar	Silchar	Silchar	Silchar	Municipal Corporation	
Cachar	Silchar	Lakhipur	Lakhipur	Lakhipur	Town committee	
Kamrup	Amingaon	Rangia	Rangia	Rangia	Municipality board	
Kamrup	Amingaon	Amingaon	Amingaon	Palashbari	Municipality board	
Kamrup Metro	Guwahati	Guwahati	Guwahati	Guwahati	Municipal Corporation	
Kamrup Metro	Guwahati	Guwahati	Guwahati	North Guwahati	Town committee	
Karbi Anglong	Diphu	Diphu	Diphu	Diphu	Municipality board	
Karbi Anglong	Diphu	Diphu	Diphu	Dokmoka	Town committee	
Karbi Anglong	Diphu	Diphu	Diphu	Howraghat	Town committee	
Karbi Anglong	Diphu	Bokajan	Bokajan	Bokajan	Town committee	
Karbi Anglong	Diphu	Hamren	Hamren	Hamren	Town committee	
Karbi Anglong	Diphu	Hamren	Hamren	Donkamokam	Town committee	
Kokrajhar	Kokrajhar	Kokrajhar	Kokrajhar	Kokrajhar	Municipality board	
Kokrajhar	Kokrajhar	Gossaigaon	Gossaigaon	Gossaigaon	Town committee	
Golaghat	Golaghat	Golaghat	Golaghat	Golaghat	Municipality board	
Golaghat	Golaghat	Golaghat	Golaghat	Dergaon	Town committee	
Golaghat	Golaghat	Bokakhat	Bokakhat	Bokakhat	Town committee	
Golaghat	Golaghat	Dansiri	Sarupathar	Sarupathar	Town committee	
Golaghat	Golaghat	Dansiri	Sarupathar	Borpathar	Town committee	
Goalpara	Goalpara	Goalpara	Goalpara	Goalpara	Municipality board	
Goalpara	Goalpara	Goalpara	Goalpara	Lakhipur	Town committee	
Chirang	Kajalgaon	Basugaon	Basugaon	Basugaon	Town committee	
Chirang	Kajalgaon	Bijni	Bijni	Bijni	Town committee	
Dibrugarh	Dibrugarh	Dibrugarh	Dibrugarh	Dibrugarh	Municipal Corporation	
Dibrugarh	Dibrugarh	Dibrugarh	Dibrugarh	Naharkatia	Town committee	
Dibrugarh	Dibrugarh	Dibrugarh	Dibrugarh	Chabua	Town committee	
Dima Hasao (Formerly North Cachar Hills)	Haflong	Haflong	Haflong	Haflong	Municipality board	
Dima Hasao (Formerly North Cachar Hills)	Haflong	Haflong	Haflong	Umrangso	Town committee	
Dima Hasao (Formerly North Cachar Hills)	Haflong	Haflong	Haflong	Mahur	Town committee	
Dima Hasao (Formerly North Cachar Hills)	Haflong	Maibong	Maibang	Maibang	Town committee	
Tinsukia	Tinsukia	Tinsukia	Tinsukia	Tinsukia	Municipality board	
Tinsukia	Tinsukia	Tinsukia	Tinsukia	Digboi	Municipality	
Tinsukia	Tinsukia	Tinsukia	Tinsukia	Margherita	Town committee	
Tinsukia	Tinsukia	Tinsukia	Tinsukia	Doomdooma	Town committee	
Tinsukia	Tinsukia	Tinsukia	Tinsukia	Makum	Town committee	
Tinsukia	Tinsukia	Sadiya	Chapakhowa			
Darrang	Mangaldoi	Mangaldoi	Mangaldoi	Mangaldoi	Municipality board	
Darrang	Mangaldoi	Mangaldoi	Mangaldoi	Kharupetia	Municipality board	
Darrang	Mangaldoi	Mangaldoi	Mangaldoi	Namkhola	Town committee	
Darrang	Mangaldoi	Mangaldoi	Mangaldoi	Duni	Town committee	
Dhubri	Dhubri	Dhubri	Dhubri	Dhubri	Municipality	
Dhubri	Dhubri	Dhubri	Dhubri	Gouripur	Town committee	
Dhubri	Dhubri	Dhubri	Dhubri	Agomani	Town committee	
Dhubri	Dhubri	Bilasipara	Bilasipara	Bilasipara	Town committee	
Dhubri	Dhubri	Bilasipara	Bilasipara	Chapar	Town committee	
Dhubri	Dhubri	South Salmara	Hatsingimari			
Dhemaji	Dhemaji	Dhemaji	Dhemaji	Dhemaji	Town committee	
Dhemaji	Dhemaji	Dhemaji	Dhemaji	Silapathar	Municipality board	
Dhemaji	Dhemaji	Jonai	Jonai			
Nagaon	Nagaon	Nagaon	Nagaon	Nagaon	Municipality board	
Nagaon	Nagaon	Nagaon	Nagaon	Kampur	Municipality board	
Nagaon	Nagaon	Nagaon	Nagaon	Roha	Municipality board	
Nagaon	Nagaon	Nagaon	Nagaon	Doboka	Town committee	
Nagaon	Nagaon	Hojai	Hojai	Hojai	Municipality board	
Nagaon	Nagaon	Hojai	Hojai	Lumding	Municipality board	
Nagaon	Nagaon	Hojai	Hojai	Lanka	Municipality board	
Nagaon	Nagaon	Kaliabor	Hatbor			
Nalbari	Nalbari	Nalbari	Nalbari	Nalbari	Municipality board	
Nalbari	Nalbari	Nalbari	Nalbari	Tihu	Town committee	
Bongaigaon	Bongaigaon	Bongaigaon	Bongaigaon	Bongaigaon	Municipality board	
Bongaigaon	Bongaigaon	North Salmari	Abhayapuri	Abhayapuri	Town committee	
Barpeta	Barpeta	Barpeta	Barpeta	Barpeta	Municipality board	
Barpeta	Barpeta	Barpeta	Barpeta	Barpeta Road	Municipality board	
Barpeta	Barpeta	Barpeta	Barpeta	Howli	Town committee	
Barpeta	Barpeta	Barpeta	Barpeta	Sarthebari	Town committee	
Barpeta	Barpeta	Bajali	Pathsala	Pathsala	Town committee	
Barpeta	Barpeta	Bajali	Pathsala	Sarbhog	Town committee	
Baksa	Musalpur	Musalpur	Musalpur			
Baksa	Musalpur	Salbari	Salbari			
Baksa	Musalpur	Tamulpur	Tamulpur	Goreswar	Municipal board	
Morigaon	Morigaon	Morigaon	Morigaon	Morigaon	Municipal board	
Morigaon	Morigaon	Jagiroad	Mayong	Jagiroad	Town Committee	
Morigaon	Morigaon	Bhuragaon	Bhuragaon	Bhuragaon	Town Committee	
Jorhat	Jorhat	Jorhat	Jorhat	Jorhat	Municipality board	
Jorhat	Jorhat	Jorhat	Jorhat	Mariani	Town committee	
Jorhat	Jorhat	Teok	Teok	Teok	Town committee	
Jorhat	Jorhat	Majuli	Garmurh			
Jorhat	Jorhat	Titabor	Titabor			
Lakhimpur	North Lakhimpur	North Lakhimpur	North Lakhimpur	North Lakhimpur	Municipality board	
Lakhimpur	North Lakhimpur	North Lakhimpur	North Lakhimpur	Bihpuria	Town committee	
Lakhimpur	North Lakhimpur	Dhakuakhona	Dhakuakhona			
Sivasagar	Sivasagar	Sivasagar	Sivasagar	Sivasagar	Municipality board	
Sivasagar	Sivasagar	Sivasagar	Sivasagar	Amguri	Town committee	
Sivasagar	Sivasagar	Sivasagar	Sivasagar	Simaluguri	Town committee	
Sivasagar	Sivasagar	Charaideo	Sonari	Sonari	Municipality board	
Sivasagar	Sivasagar	Charaideo	Sonari	Moranhat	Town committee	
Sivasagar	Sivasagar	Nazira	Nazira	Nazira	Municipality board	
sonitpur	Tezpur	Tezpur	Tezpur	Tezpur	Municipality board	
sonitpur	Tezpur	Tezpur	Tezpur	Rangapara	Town committee	
sonitpur	Tezpur	Tezpur	Tezpur	Dhekiajuli	Municipal Board	
sonitpur	Tezpur	Gohpur	Gohpur	Gohpur	Town Committee	
sonitpur	Tezpur	Biswnath	Biswanath Chariali	Biswanath Chariali	Municipality board	
sonitpur	Tezpur	Biswnath	Biswanath Chariali	Gohpur	Town committee	
Hailakandi	Hailakandi	Hailakandi	Hailakandi	Hailakandi	Municipality board	
Hailakandi	Hailakandi	Hailakandi	Hailakandi	lala	Town committee	

the meaning of this colour is "there is no town"
