= Lalit Chandra Nath =

Indian musician

Lalit Chandra Nath popularly known as Lalit Oja or Lalit Chandra Nath Oja (1923 – 21 October 2013) was a notable person from Assam.

== Early life ==
He was born to a poor family in Saatghoriya Gaon, Sipajhar, Darrang district in 1923. His father Bhuban Chandra Nath was also an Sukananni Oja. Faguni Devi was his mother. He has been awarded the prestigious Sangeet Natak Akademi Award in 1983 and again in 2012 the same organization honoured him with the Rabindranath Tagore award for his expertise in Sukananni Ojapali and for contribution in popularizing this traditional folk art form. He has performed Ojapali and Deodhani dance in various places in and outside India.

A biographical documentary film on Lalit Oja and his art, 'Haate Mudra Mukhe Pod Mayursodrix Nach' (Assamese), 'Lyrics with Body and Soul' (English), was made with an objective to make people aware of the contribution made by this man in preserving and popularizing the folk art. The film was directed by Prabin Hazarika.
