= Ojapali =

Type of dance

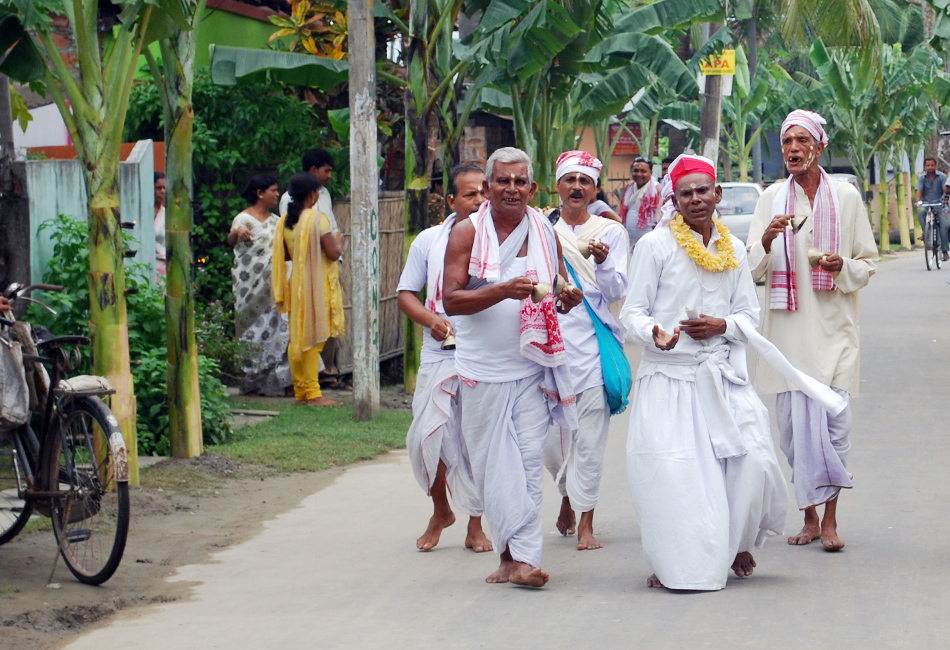
SHAKTA GODDESS DEVI PADAMVATI{MANASA MAA} byah gowa ojapali : darang

Ojapali is an Assamese narrative song–dance tradition performed by an ensemble led by an oja (lead) and supported by pali (chorus). Scholars trace its roots to the pan-Indian kathakata (epic storytelling) tradition and date its development well before the neo-Vaishnavite movement in Assam. Darrang district is considered a historical hub of Ojapali performance, particularly from the time of King Dharmanarayana (1615–1637). The form blends sung narration, dialogue, gesture and semi-improvised dramatisation, accompanied primarily by small cymbals (khutitaal).

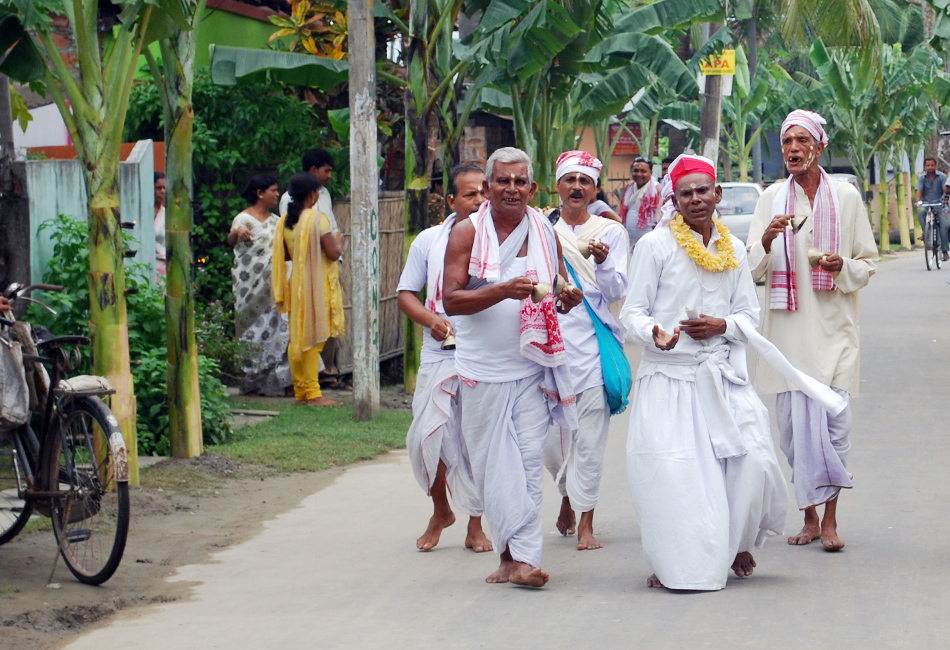
An Ojapali ensemble, Assam.

== Origins and historical context ==
Ojapali is regarded as deriving from the kathakata tradition of storytelling, adapted to local ritual and community performance. Its epic-based strands cite Assamese retellings of the Ramayana and Mahabharata, while non-epic strands are rooted in Śākta (Shakti) worship practices. The form consolidated under the Kamata kingdom and was patronised in Darrang under King Dharmanarayana. During the fifteenth–sixteenth centuries, Ojapali intersected with the Bhakti movement in Assam; later writers note that elements of Ojapali informed developments in the theatre and music associated with the neo-Vaishnavite sattras.

Several art historians and performance scholars also suggest that Srimanta Śaṅkaradeva’s theatrical idiom (Ankiya Naat/Bhaona) was influenced by Ojapali.

== Performance and style ==
An Ojapali troupe typically comprises an oja (lead) and four or five pali (chorus). The chief chorister, the Daina-pali, stands to the right of the oja and advances the narrative through repartee and explanation. Performance combines sung verses, dialogue, rhythmic footwork and gestures; the ensemble keeps time with khutitaal (small cymbals), and in some contexts may be joined by other percussive support. Costumes vary by subtype: Byah ensembles often use white turbans and chapkan, while Sattriya Ojapali adopts sankari attire and ornamentation consistent with sattra practice.

== Variations / forms ==
Scholarly sources commonly distinguish three principal forms, sometimes grouped under “epic-based” and “non-epic/Śākta-linked” heads:

- Byah/Bigoya (Vyāsa-gowa) Ojapali – epic-based; narrations from the Ramayana, Mahabharata, Bhagavata Purana and other purāṇic themes.
- Sukananni / Maroi-gowa (Manasā) Ojapali – Śākta-linked; ritual narratives centred on the serpent goddess Manasā (Maroi). Many troupes sing padāvali composed by the poet Narayanadeva in the Padma-Purana tradition.
- Ramayani Ojapali – performances focused on episodes from the Ramayana.

In addition, a distinct Sattriya Ojapali evolved within the sattra milieu; scholars describe it as Śaṅkaradeva’s adaptation, synthesising Byah elements with sankari aesthetics.

== Cultural significance ==
Sukananni/Manasā Ojapali is closely associated with Śākta worship and temple-centred ritual in lower Assam, particularly narratives of Beula–Lakhindar linked to Manasā devotion. Beyond ritual, Ojapali has served as a medium for moral instruction, community memory and, in the twentieth century, public mobilisation.

== Geographical distribution ==
Historically anchored in present-day Darrang (including Mangaldai and Sipajhar), Ojapali continues in parts of lower Assam such as Nalbari, Kamrup, Bajali, Baksa and Udalguri, with practitioners active in Tezpur and adjoining districts. Contemporary performances are also reported from Mangaldai groups led by disciples of Oja Upendra Kalita.

== Notable practitioners ==
- Lalit Chandra Nath (Lalit Oja) – exponent of Sukananni Ojapali; Sangeet Natak Akademi Award (1983) and Rabindranath Tagore Award (2012); long-time work in Sipajhar.
- Kinaram Nath Oja – Sangeet Natak Akademi Award (2012) for Sukanani Ojapali.
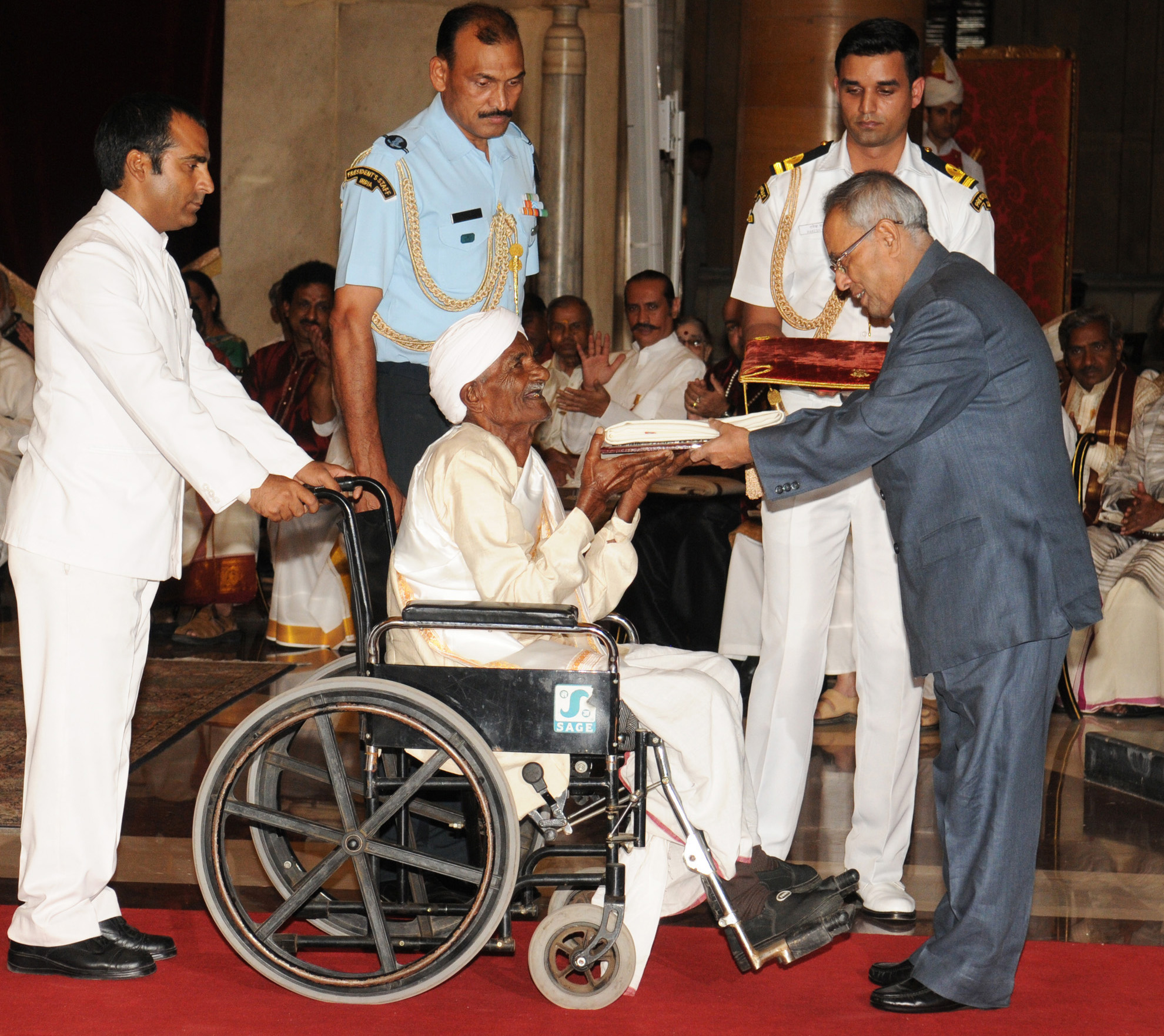
  Kinaram Nath Oja receiving the SNA Award (2012).
- Durgabar Kayastha – early poet–performer linked to ‘’Durgavari Ojapali’’ (lyrical Ramayana repertoire).
- Baloram Konwar and troupe – Mangaldai-based Byah Ojapali group active in the 1990s–2010s, disciples of Oja Upendra Kalita.

== Preservation and revival ==
Support mechanisms include artist pensions, workshops and training schemes under the Ministry of Culture and the Sangeet Natak Akademi; university and civil-society initiatives have also documented and taught the form. Contemporary reportage notes both continued practice and challenges to livelihoods for troupes, particularly during the COVID-19 pandemic.

== See also ==
- Sattriya
- Bhaona
- Deodhani dance

== Sources ==
- Baruah, Sudarshana (July 2016). "Satriya Ojapali Music of Assam and Its Classical Elements". Sangeet Galaxy: 12–18.
- Baruah, Sudarshana (2017). Ojapali: the ancient music tradition of Assam, its application in Vaishnav sattra and classical elements. Chandra Prakash.
- Baruah, Tiluttoma; Choudhury, Kunal (2023). "Ojapali Dance of Assam: A Brief Overview" (PDF). Annals of Multidisciplinary Research, Innovation and Technology. 2 (2): 106–109.
- Borah, Samikhya R. (August 2023). "THE SATTRIYA OJAPALI TRADITION OF ASSAM: A BRIEF OVERVIEW" (PDF). Gap Bodhi Taru. 6. ISSN 2581-5857. Archived from the original (PDF) on 22 October 2023.
