= Nejib Ahmed =

Photographer

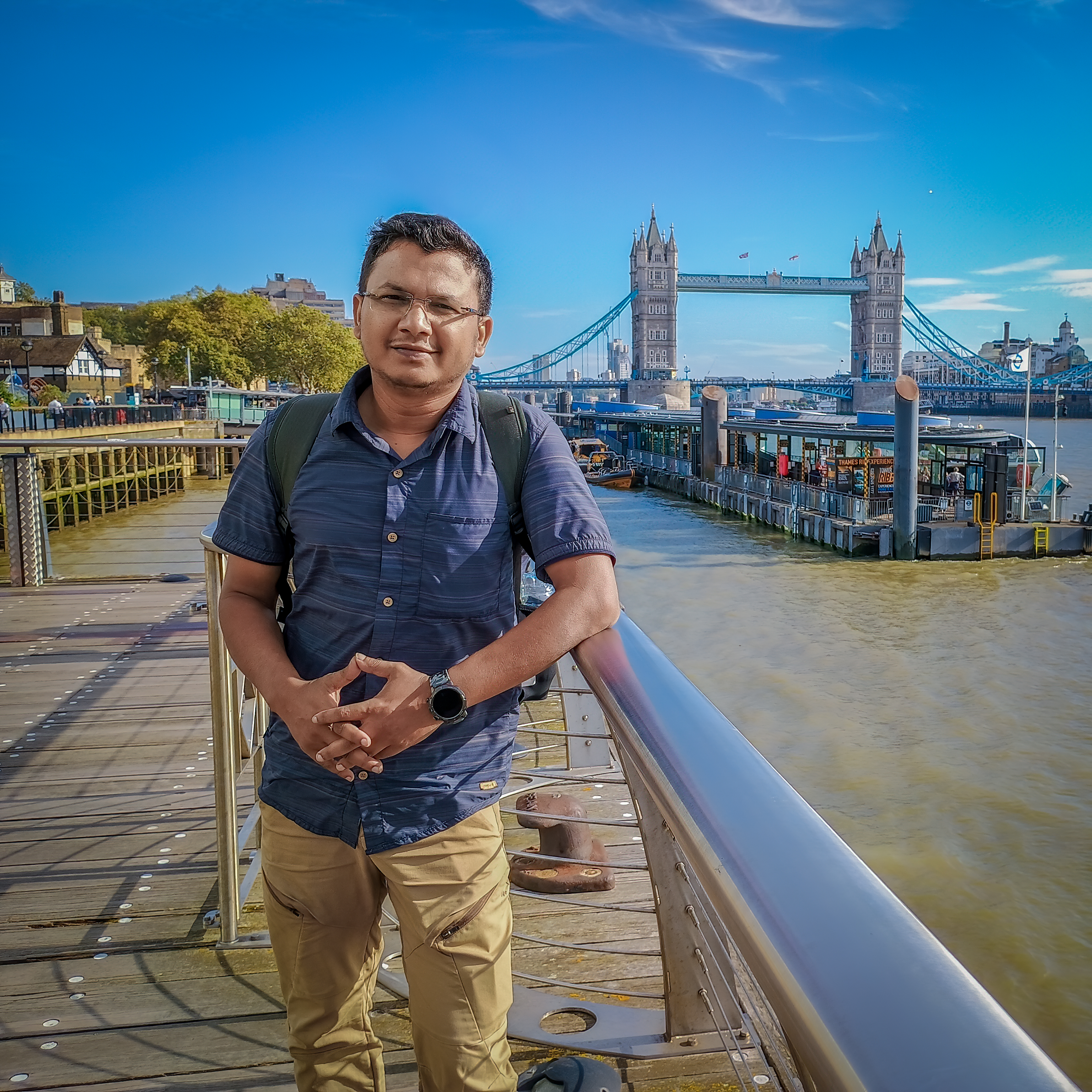
- Nejib Ahmed in London
- Years active: From 2010 to present
- Known for: Wildlife photography
- Website: https://nejibahmed.com/

Nejib Ahmed is photographer based in Assam. He received invitation to attend the 59th Wildlife Photographer of the Year event in 2023 and he was awarded as Highly Commended, hosted at the Natural History Museum in London where his photograph was exhibited. His photograph, highlighting human-animal conflict, clicked in the periphery of Orang National Park situated in Darrang and Sonitpur districts in Assam.

== Other achievements ==
Nejib's works have been published in some of the prestigious wildlife magazines and journals globally. His images have been published in National Geographic, BBC Wildlife, Sony BBC Earth, Sanctuary Asia and Outlook Traveller among others.

Nejib was the winner of the 2022 Nature inFocus International Photography Competition (Conservation Section). Apart from that, he has won honours like Nature Photography Award in 2018 from Photography Club of Assam and Nature Photographer of the Year in 2019 from Photographic Society of Assam.

== Books ==
Nejib has co-authored a book named 'Birds of Orang' with Pradipta Baruah, DFO of Orang National Park. He has partnered with Champak Goswami to write another book named 'Wildlife Photography and Ecotourism'.
