= Binanda Kumar Saikia =

Indian politician

Member of Assam Legislative Assembly
- In office 2016–2021
- Preceded by: Dr Zoii Nath Sarmah
- Constituency: Sipajhar (Vidhan Sabha constituency)

Member of 12th, 13th, & 14th Assam Legislative Assembly

Chairman, Assam Legislative Assembly Library

Chairman, Act Implementation Committee, Assam Legislative Assembly

Member, Committee on Public Undertakings, Assam Legislative Assembly

Member, Committee on Government Assurance, Assam Legialative Assembly

Member, Public Accounts Committee, Assam Legislative Assembly

Member, Rules Committee, Assam Legislative Assembly

Chairman, The Assam State Textbook Production & Publication Corporation Ltd.

Chairman, Committee on Local Fund Accounts, Assam Legislative Assembly

General Secretary, Post Graduate Students' Union, Gauhati University.
- In office 1991–1992

Vice President, All Assam Students' Union.
- In office 1991–1994

Member, University Court, Gauhati University
- Incumbent
- Assumed office 1992

Member, Executive Council, Assam Science & Technology University

Member, Zonal Railway User Consultative Committee, NF Railway
- Incumbent
- Assumed office 1997

Personal details
- Born: 1 April 1964 (age 62) Duni, District-Darrang
- Party: Indian National Congress
- Other political affiliations: Bharatiya Janata Party
- Spouse: Dr. Pranita Saikia
- Parent: Late Harendra Nath Saikia (father)
- Education: Gauhati University
- Occupation: MLA of Assam Legislative Assembly (nominated) in 2016, Politician, Social and Political activist
- Nickname: Binanda

Binanda Kumar Saikia is an Indian National Congress politician from Assam. He has been elected in Assam Legislative Assembly election in 2016 from Sipajhar constituency.

He was also elected to the Assam Legislative Assembly from Sipajhar constituency in 2011 as a nominee of the Indian National Congress.
