= Assam Skill University =

Public state university in Assam, India

- অসম দক্ষতা বিশ্ববিদ্যালয়
- Type: Public
- Established: 2021; 5 years ago
- Affiliations: UGC
- Chancellor: Chief Minister of Assam
- Vice-Chancellor: Dr.Om Prakash (I/C)
- Location: Mangaldai, Assam, India
- Website: www.asu.ac.in

Assam Skill University is a public state university located at Mangaldai, Darrang district, Assam, India. It was established by The Assam Skill University Act, 2020 which was passed by the Assam Legislative Assembly on 3 September 2020 and received the assent of the Governor of Assam on 12 October 2020

On 7 August 2021, former IAS officer, who had served as the Additional Chief Secretary of Assam, Subhash Chandra Das was appointed as the Vice Chancellor of the University. The Chief Minister of Assam by virtue of his office is the chancellor of the university.

== History ==
On 15 February 2021, Chief Minister Sarbananda Sonowal laid the foundation stone of Assam Skill University at Mangaldoi, Darrang. He was accompanied by minister of Skill, Employment and entrepreneurship department Chandra Mohan Patowary and other dignitaries.

The Assam Skill University will be set up under the external-aided project funded by the Asian Development Bank.
