= Sipajhar Assembly constituency =

Constituency of the Assam legislative assembly in India

Sipajhar
- Constituency No. 49 for the Assam Legislative Assembly

Constituency details
- Country: India
- Region: Northeast India
- State: Assam
- District: Darrang
- Lok Sabha constituency: Darrang–Udalguri
- Established: 1978
- Reservation: None

Sipajhar is one of the 126 assembly constituencies of Assam Legislative Assembly. Sipajhar forms part of the Darrang–Udalguri Lok Sabha constituency.

== Members of the Legislative Assembly ==
Year	Name	Party
2001	Zoii Nath Sarmah	Asom Gana Parishad
2006	Binanda Kumar Saikia	Indian National Congress
2011	Binanda Kumar Saikia	Indian National Congress
2016	Binanda Kumar Saikia	Bharatiya Janata Party
2021	Paramananda Rajbongshi	Bharatiya Janata Party
2026	Paramananda Rajbongshi	Bharatiya Janata Party

== Election results ==
=== 2026 ===
2026 Assam Legislative Assembly election: Sipajhar
Party	Candidate	Votes	%	±%
BJP	Paramananda Rajbongshi	99,720	55.83	up
INC	Binanda Kumar Saikia	74475	41.69	
NOTA	NOTA	2396	1.34	
Margin of victory		25,245		
Turnout		1,78,622		
Rejected ballots				
Registered electors				
BJP hold		Swing		

=== 2021 ===
2021 Assam Legislative Assembly election: Sipajhar
Party	Candidate	Votes	%	±%
BJP	Paramananda Rajbongshi	74,739	50.33	−0.19
INC	Kuldip Barua	67,605	42.72	
NOTA	None of the Above	1,326	0.77	
Turnout		203,711	85.73	
BJP hold		Swing		

== See also ==
- Sipajhar
- List of constituencies of Assam Legislative Assembly
