= Anil Bora =

Student leader and second martyr of the Medium movement in Assam

Anil Bora (অনিল বৰা)
- Born: October 2, 1951; Palashani village, Nagaon district
- Died: October 7, 1972 (aged 21); Hojai, Nagaon district
- Known for: Martyr in Assamese medium movement, 1972

Anil Bora (2 October 1951 – 7 October 1972) was a student youth leader and a martyr of the Medium of Instruction Movement in Assam. Born in 1951 in Palashani village near Nagaon, he passed matriculation and higher secondary from Nagaon Govt. H.S. School and enrolled in Nagaon College with Zoology as a major. He was a nationalist and joined the language movement when he was serving as the general secretary of the Students' Union of Nagaon College. He was assassinated by miscreants at Hojai on 7 October 1972 while leading a group of students from Nagaon to Hojai in support of a protest call by the student organization. In his remembrance, Bhupen Hazarika wrote in Amar Pratinidhi magazine: “Martyr Anil Bora was the reddest Palash in Palashani, whose brilliance has added the hue of dawn to the sky of our language, and will continue to do so till the Luit flows...”.

== Childhood and education ==
Anil Bora was born just after midnight on October 2, 1951, in Palashani village near Nagaon, Assam, to teachers Chandra Charan Bora and Maniki Bora. His father, Chandra Charan Bora, later became the headmaster of the primary school and, as a devoted follower of Mahatma Gandhi, was jailed for three years for his participation in the Indian Independence Movement.

Anil Bora began his formal education in 1956 at Karayani L. P. School, Nagaon, where he earned a scholarship. He initially attended Karayani High School before transferring to Nagaon Govt. H. S. School in 1964, where he completed his matriculation and higher secondary education. He then enrolled at Nagaon College, majoring in Zoology. Shortly after enrolling in college, Anil Bora was elected as the general secretary of the institution's Students' Union. Demonstrating his popularity and leadership skills, he was also simultaneously elected the assistant general secretary of the Nagaon branch of the All Assam Students' Union (AASU).

== Participation in Medium of Instruction Movement ==
=== Background ===
In March 1972, a Gauhati University circular permitted students to answer examination questions in Bengali in addition to Assamese and Bengali. This decision sparked a protest among some Assamese students. While they accepted the provision for students from Cachar, their opposition centered on the application of the Bengali language option within the Brahmaputra Valley. In response to the protests, the university quickly reversed its position, declaring that only Assamese and English would be accepted in examination answer scripts. This sudden change, however, provoked fresh protests in Cachar and some other places, eventually escalating the matter to the Supreme Court of India. Bengali students at Hojai College protested this decision and gheraoed the principal. The police arrived later, at 11:00 PM, to rescue the principal and others. Following this, the students organized a procession that same night and decided to observe a strike. At this time, Anil Bora, who was at Nagaon College, traveled to Hojai with a few colleagues. He met with prominent Bengali student leaders, including Paritosh Pal Choudhury, and argued in favor of the Assamese medium of instruction. This led to a heated argument between him and the local leaders there. In 15 September 1972 AASU raised the demand to make Assamese as the medium of instruction up to the graduate level in addition to English language. In 23 September 1972, it was proposed in the Legislative Assembly that the two universities of Assam will adopt Assamese as the main language of instruction in Brahmaputra valley while a new university would be set up in Barak Valley. AASU called for Bandh on 5 October 1972. It was observed in all places of Assam except Hojai where a section of people protested against the Bandh. It turned violent in some places including Kharupetia where a young boy, Mozammil Haque, died.

=== Protests ===
In response to this tragic event, the All Assam Students' Union called for a Black Day protest from October 7 to 13. Anil Bora was a key participant, actively campaigning and urging the public to support the Language of Medium movement. A significant public meeting was organized on October 7 at Jubilee Ground in Nagaon, demanding justice for Martyr Mozammil Haque. While attending the event, Anil Bora learned of a group of students traveling toward Hojai by car and decided to bring the students back. He along with a few friends headed to Hojai but was stopped at Nilbagan by the Sub-inspector and the Officer-in-Charge along with a police force. At the request of Anil Bora and friends, the permission for taking out a silent protest was granted.

== Death ==
Upon reaching Hojai, Anil Bora and his companions learned that a frenzied mob was waiting for the student protesters. Sensing imminent danger, Bora convinced everyone to turn back, personally helping them get into their cars. Unable to secure a ride himself, he and two friends started walking toward Nagaon. They were suddenly ambushed by a mob; while his friends managed to escape, Anil Bora was struck on the head and fell. He went missing for ten days. On October 17, his headless body was tragically discovered inside a bag on a riverbank, three kilometers from Nagaon. His head was never recovered. News of the brutal killing sparked a massive uproar across Nagaon and Assam. His body was brought first to Nagaon College, then to Jubilee Field, and finally to his native village. He was ultimately cremated at Nehrubali, on the premises of the Nagaon Sahitya Sabha.

== Legacy ==
7 October is observed as a Memorial day every year in honor of martyr Anil Bora. A statue of Anil Bora was inaugurated in 2010 at the site of his cremation. Another statue was inaugurated at Anil Bora H. S. School at his birthplace in 2022.
