= Gakhirkhowa para =

Gakhirkhowa Para (also known as Gakhirkhowapara) is a village located in the west side of the Mangaldai town under Danhee Mouza of Darrang district state Assam. Its residents practice both Hinduism and Islam. The historical Darrangi Koch Raja's Raj Howly is situated in this village. The road distance from Mangaldai to Gakhirkhowapara is nearly 3 km (1.9 mi). The village connects with the city of Mangaldai through Mangaldai Patharughat Khairabari Road. The village operates under the post office of Janaramchowka( জনাৰামচৌকা ), and its PIN No is 784529. Gakhirkhowa Para has a population of 1639, 805 of which are male and 834 are female as per Population Census 2011.

In Gakhirkhowa Para, the population of children with age 0-6 is 178, making up 10.86% of total population of the village. The average sex ratio of Gakhirkhowa Para is 1036, which is higher than the Assam state average of 958. Child Sex Ratio for Gakhirkhowa Para as per census is 695, lower than Assam's average of 962.

Gakhirkhowa Para has a higher literacy rate than Assam. In India's state Census of 2011, the literacy rate in Gakhirkhowa Para was 85.56% compared to 72.19% of Assam. In Gakhirkhowa Para, male literacy stands at 90.57% while female literacy rate was 80.95%. The only primary school present in this village is Harinkhoja L.P. School, established in the year 1939 at the time of British rule.

The main source of income of the village is agriculture. The people of Gakhirkhowapara speak the mother tongue Assamese(অসমীয়া ভাষা). The religious places of the village are Moamoriya Hari Mandir, Mazar, Masjid and Roja howly Durga Mandir.
