= Kharupetia =

- Municipality
- Location in Assam, India Kharupetia (India)
- Coordinates: 26.52°N 92.13°E

Government
  - Body: Kharupetia Municipal Board
- Elevation: 37 m (121 ft)

Population (2011)
  - Total: 18,501

Languages
  - Official: Assamese
- Time zone: UTC+5:30 (IST)
- PIN: 784115
- Vehicle registration: AS13
- Website: kharupetia.assamurban.in

Kharupetia (IPA: ˌkɑːrʊˈpiːtɪə) (also spelt 'Kharupatia') is a town and a municipal board in Darrang district in the Indian state of Assam. It is about 17 km from Mangaldoi, the District headquarters and 87 km from Guwahati, the gateway of Northeast India. It is connected by National Highway 15.

== Demographics ==
Kharupetia had population of 18,501 of which 9,764 are males while 8,737 are females as per report released by Census India 2011. Population of Children with age of 0-6 is 1816 which is 9.82% of total population of Kharupetia. In Kharupetia, Female Sex Ratio is of 895 against state average of 958. Moreover Child Sex Ratio in Kharupetia is around 998 compared to Assam state average of 962. Literacy rate of Kharupetia is 83.66% higher than state average of 72.19%. In Kharupetia, Male literacy is around 88.87% while female literacy rate is 77.78%.
