= Bahgarah =

- Village
- Interactive map of Bahgarah
- Country: India
- State: Assam
- District: Darrang

Area
  - Total: 4 km^{2} (1.5 sq mi)

Population (2011)
  - Total: 1,000
  - Density: 250/km^{2} (650/sq mi)

Languages
  - Official: Assamese
- Time zone: UTC+5:30 (IST)
- Vehicle registration: AS

Bahgarah is the name of a village in the district of Darrang, a district of Asom in India.

== Demography ==
Bahgarah consists of seven villages inhabited by both Hindus and Muslims. The [Muslim]s in this village are called [Goria]s. They are the descendants of the soldiers who invaded [Asom] in 1206 AD under the leadership of [Bakhtiar Uddin Khilji], and the later part of the 14th century.

The [Muslim]s are originally from modern day [Malda] district of West Bengal.

== Etymology ==
The name has come from the word "Bah" meaning bamboo and "Gar" meaning fort.

It is said that in the course of the battle of Saraighat when Ram Singh attacked [Asom] the people of this locality built a fence of bamboo to ward off the enemy. And it has been attested by [Edward Gait] that when Ram Singh attacked this place with 200 horsemen he could not enter the village because of the bamboo fence. The village was renamed Bahgarah.
