= Deodhani dance =

Folk dance of Assam

Deodhani dance is a Shaman folk dance from the Indian state of Assam. It can be performed either solo or in a group. Deodhani is of Bodo origin. A group performance of Deodhani generally consists of three or four women. The dance form is associated with the worship of the snake goddess Marei/Maroi. A Deodhani dance is generally performed to the accompaniment of songs sung by an Ojha, a traditional chorus leader in the Darrang district of Assam.

== History ==
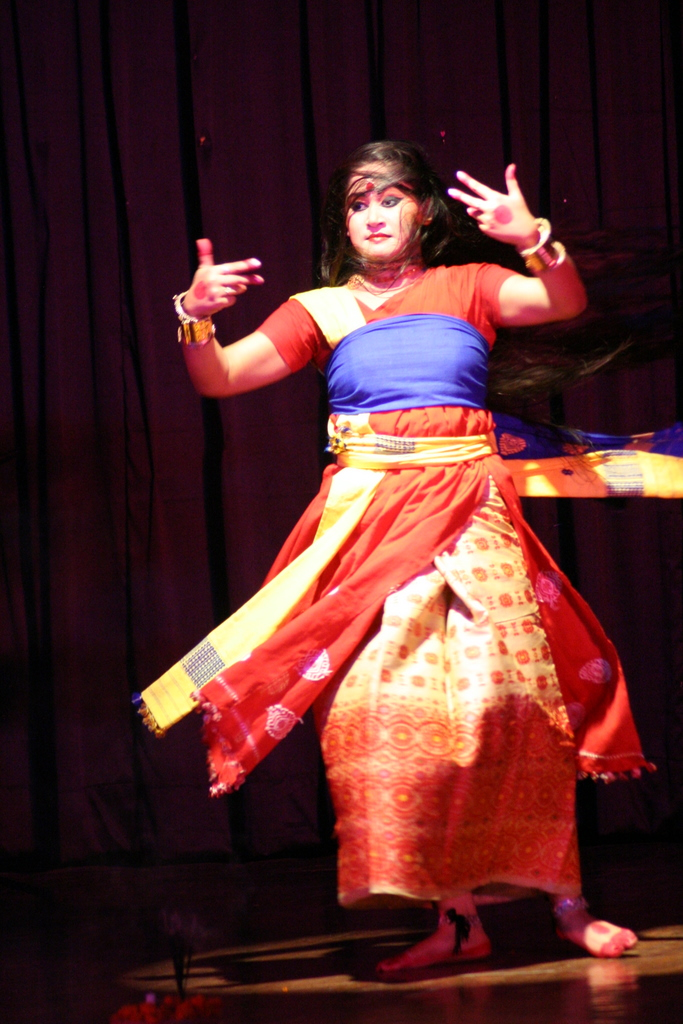
Deodhoni Dance Ritual

Deodhani is derived from two words – Deo, which means God, and Dhani, which means woman, literally meaning a woman possessed (Shaman) by god. A male Shaman form is also present, called 'Deodha-Joki' in Kamrup by the Bodo people and 'Deodhai' elsewhere in Assam. Deodhani depicts the dance of a Shaman woman or man when he or she is possessed by a spiritual being. In Deodhani, the songs sung by Ojapali are known as Xuknoni in undivided Darrang district and In Deodhani, the songs sung by Ojapali are known as Xuknoni in undivided Darrang district whereas in undivided Kamrup district it is accompanied by Kamrupi Bor-Dhol's.

== Specification ==
Dancers take a sword and shield and present a virile war dance during the performance.
