= Namkhola =

- Region
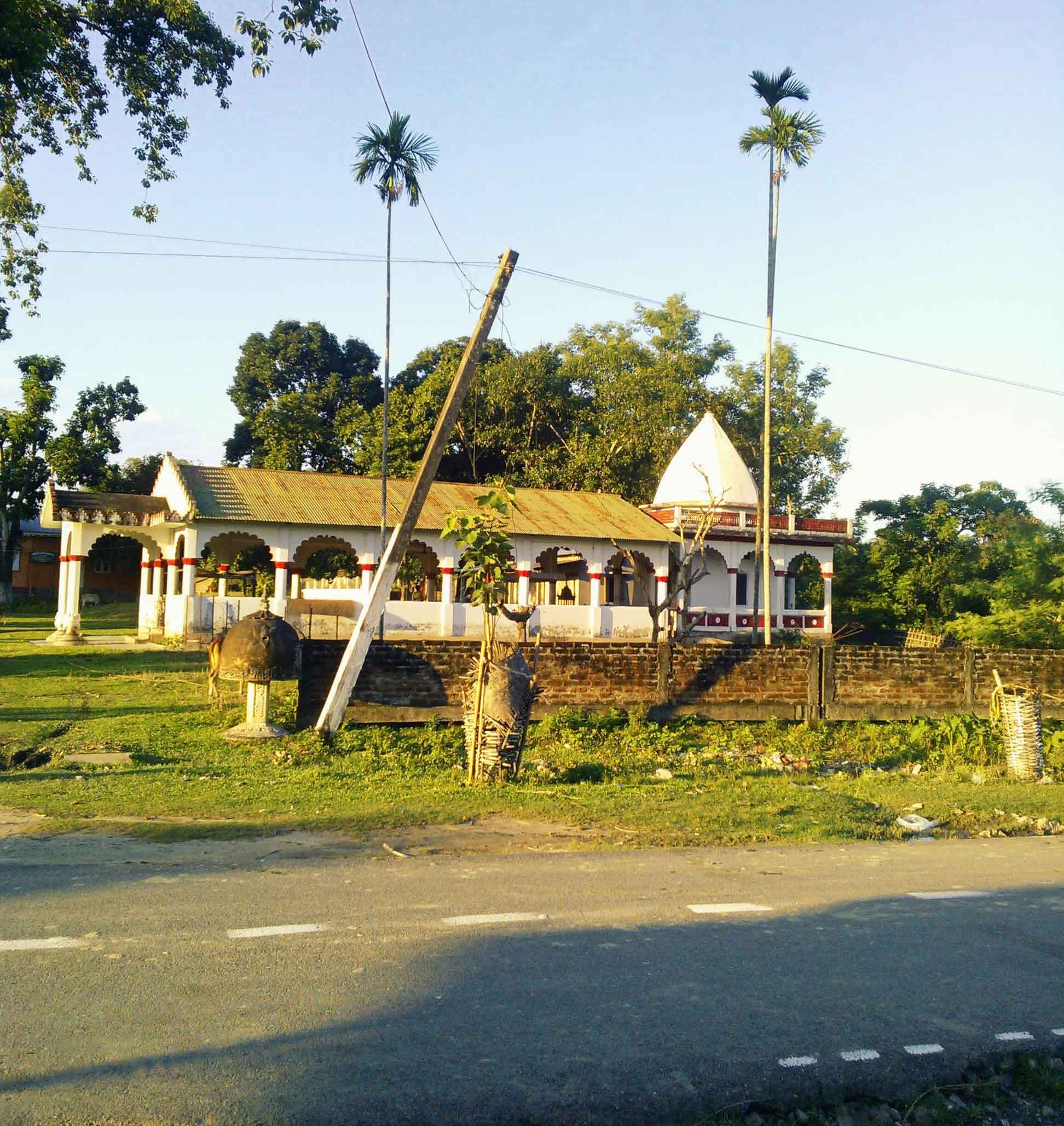
- Shiv Mandir, Namkhola Bazaar Chowk

- Location within Assam Location within India
- Coordinates: 26.5404601°N 91.8293953°E
- Country: India
- State: Assam
- Region: Upper Assam
- District: Darrang
- Zone: 1 (Central, North)
- Founder: Government of Assam

Government
  - Type: Gaon Panchayat
  - Body: 1
  - Gaon Burha: Unknown

Languages
  - Official: Assamese
- Time zone: UTC+5:30 (IST)
- PIN: 784152
- Vehicle registration: AS-13
- ^{† Estimated as on 2013}

Namkhola is a popular region in Khairabar tehsil, combined villages Bah Molla and Athiyabari in Darrang district, Assam, India. It is one of the fastest growing market place in north-western part of Darrang district.

== Location ==
Namkhola is situated in the north-western part of Darrang district. Nearest city Guwahati is at a distance of 74 km from it. District headquarter Mangaldai is 24 km away from Namkhola. This place is well connected through road transport. Nearest railway station is Khoirabari at a distance of 9 km.

== Banks ==
Assam Gramin Vikash Bank, Namkhola Branch was opened in the year 2014. Prior to that only one bank was available in Namkhola. One ultra small branch of State Bank of India is also there.

- Central Bank of India, Sipajhar (Namkhola Branch)
