= Zoii Nath Sarmah =

Indian politician

Dr Zoii Nath Sarmah
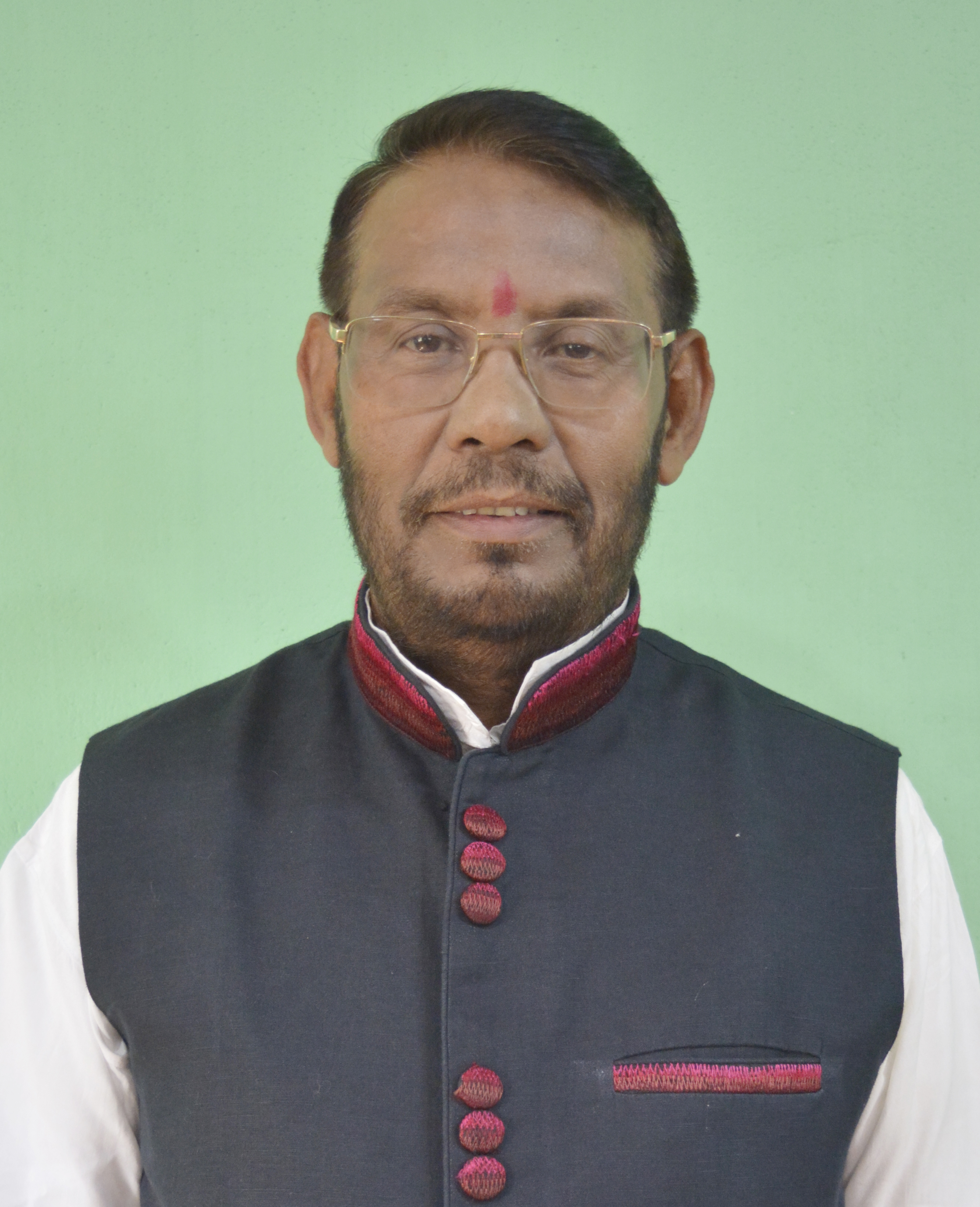

Former Member of Assam Legislative Assembly
- Preceded by: Binanda Kumar Saikia
- Constituency: Sipajhar (Vidhan Sabha constituency)

Member of Assam Legislative Assembly (1991-1996)

Member of Assam Legislative Assembly (1996-2001)

Personal details
- Born: 01/03/1956 Dariapara Rangamati Darrang Assam
- Party: Asom Gana Parishad (1991–2001)
- Parent: Late Padma Nath Sarmah (father)
- Occupation: Former MLA of Assam Legislative Assembly (nominated) in 2016; Politician; Social and political activist
- Website: drzoiinathsarmah.in

Dr Zoii Nath Sarmah is an Indian politician who has served as MLA from the Sipajhar (Vidhan Sabha constituency) constituency in Assam from 1991 to 2001 on an Asom Gana Parishad ticket. He joined Indian National Congress on 2016 and contested from the Sipajhar constituency.
