= Patharighat =

Town in Assam, India

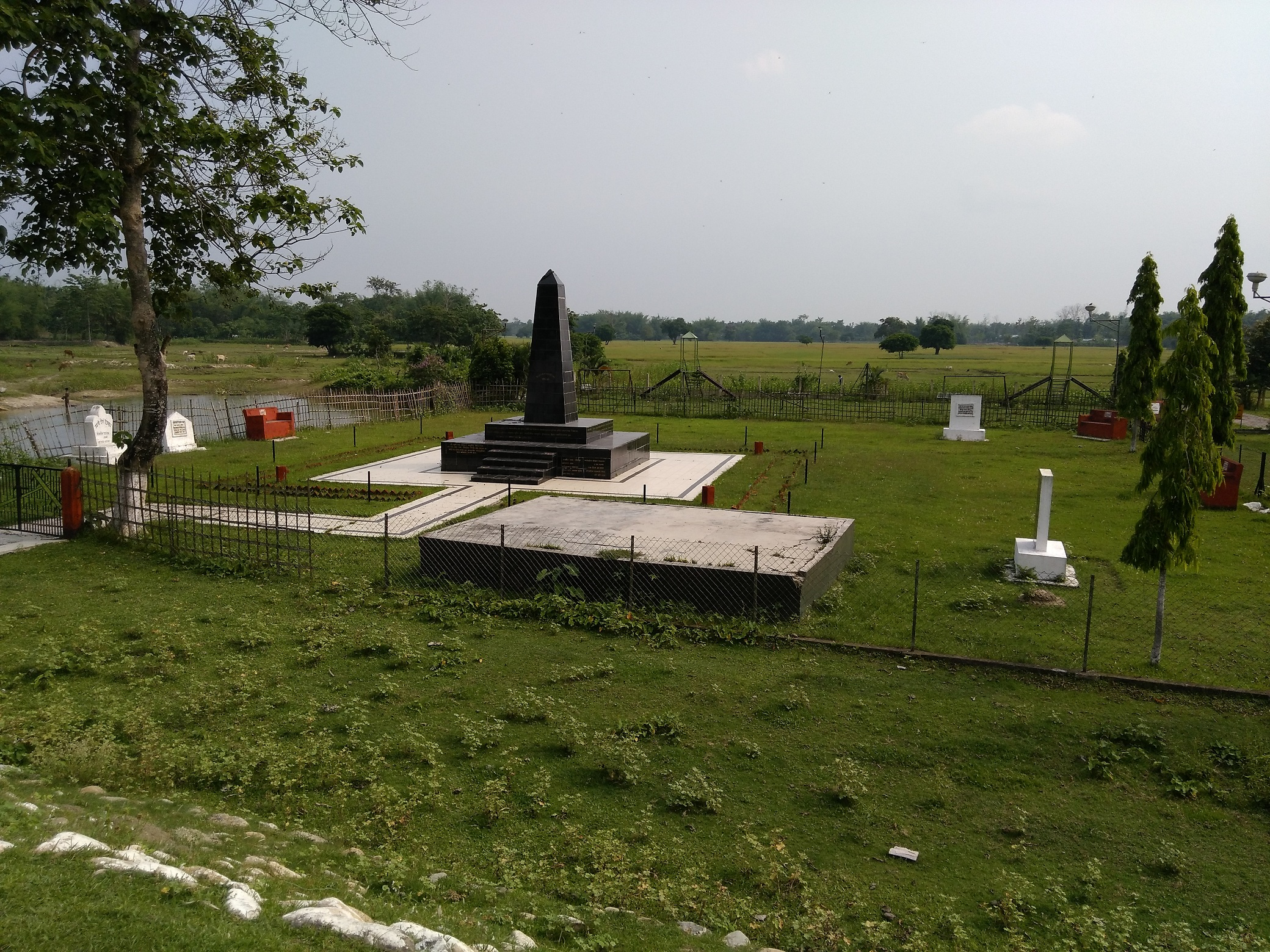
Swahid Stambha, Patharighat

Patharighat, previously known as Patharughat, is a town and headquarter of eponymous revenue circle in Darrang district. It is 35 km northeast of Baruah Souk area of north Guwahati on northbank of Brahmaputra River. It is the site of memorial for the Patharughat massacre caused on 28 January 1894 by the Indian Imperial Police during the Patharughat peasant uprising, the day is commemorated as the Krishak Swahid Divas (Farmer Martyrs Day).

== Battle of Patharughat and Patharughat massacre ==
The place is famous for the event of 1894 popularly known as Patharughatar Ran (Battle of Patharughat) during the Patharughat peasant uprising against the British Raj. After the British annexation of Assam in 1826, surveys of the vast lands of the state began. On the basis of such surveys, colonial authorities began to impose land taxes, reportedly by 70-80 per cent, much to the resentment of the farmers, who previously paid taxes in-kind or provided service in lieu of cash.

The colonial authorities began to view the peasant protests and gatherings as grounds for sedition. On 28 January 1894 tempers flared as the authorities refused to listen to further grievances. A lathi charge by the Indian Imperial Police occurred followed by an open firing which left 15 peasants killed and 37 wounded according to official Raj records or 140 killed according to unofficial sources. Patharighat is known as Assam's Jallianwala Bagh.

Since 2000, the army has been paying homage to the martyrs on 28 January every year, which is commemorated as the "Krishak Swahid Divas". Army has also set up martyrs' column in memory of those killed.

== See also ==
- List of massacres in India
