= Paramananda Rajbongshi =

Indian politician

Member of Legislative Assembly Sipajhar constituency
- Incumbent
- Assumed office 2021
- Constituency: Sipajhar

Personal details
- Born: Assam
- Party: Bharatiya Janata Party
- Other political affiliations: Asom Gana Parishad (In 2021, he joined BJP)
- Education: Gauhati University
- Occupation: Politician

Paramananda Rajbongshi is a Bharatiya Janata Party politician from the Indian state of Assam. He has been elected in Assam Legislative Assembly election in 2021 from Sipajhar.

== Early life ==
Paramananda Rajbongshi, the son of the late Anandi Ram Rajbongshi, resides in Patidarrang Village, Darrang district, Assam, at 62 years old. He obtained his Ph.D. from Gauhati University in 1994.

== Career ==
He is a writer and worked as an associate Professor at Pragjyotish College, Guwahati. He is a former President of Assam Sahitya Sabha.

=== Political career ===
He was a member of Asom Gana Parishad. In 2021, he joined the Bharatiya Janata Party. He contested from the Sipajhar constituency in the 2021 election, winning the seat for the BJP by defeating his nearest opponent by 7134 votes.
