= Dipila =

Dipila Dipila Chowka
- Town Chowk
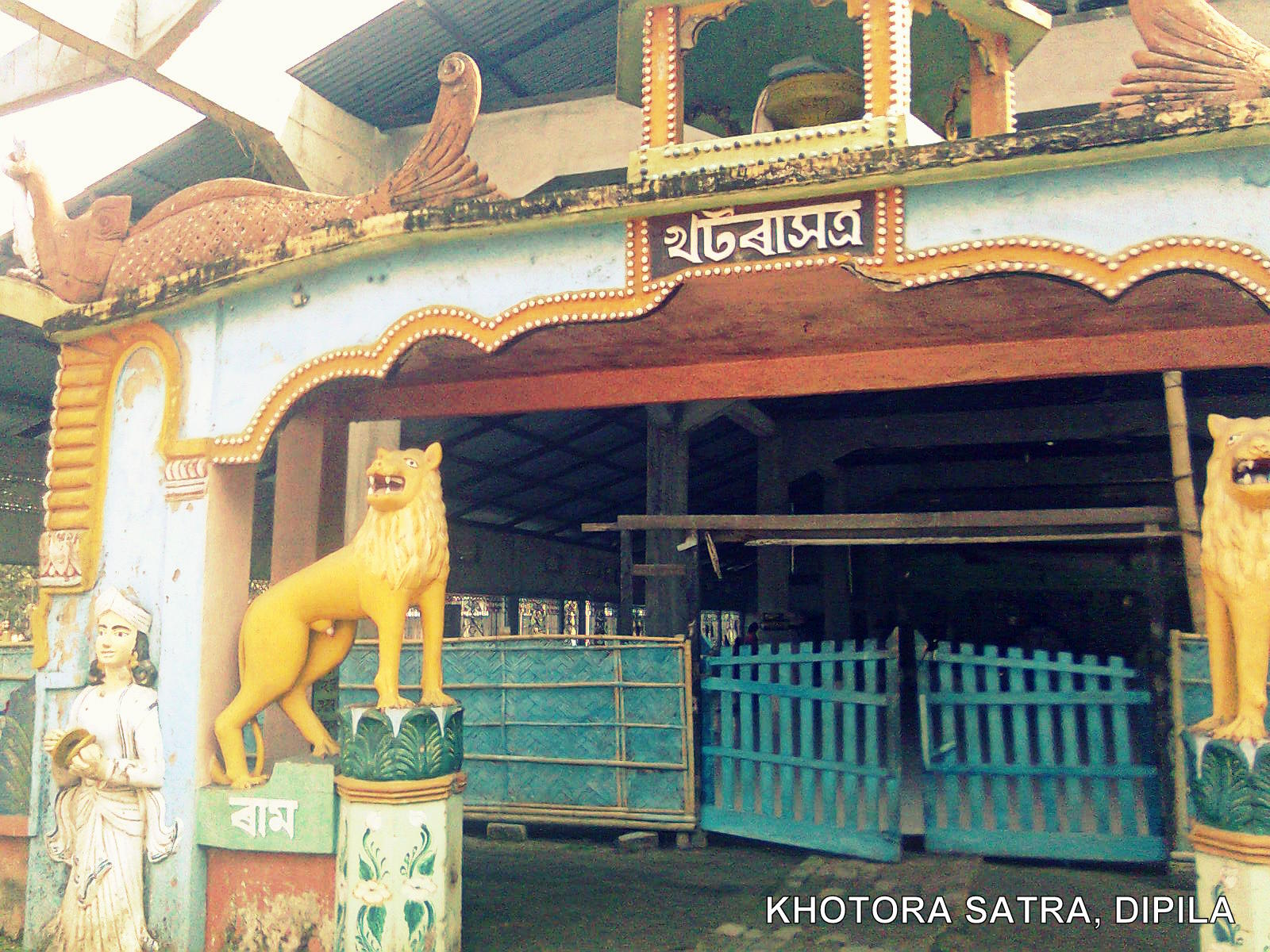
- Entrance of Khatara Satra near Dipila

- Location in Assam, India Dipila (India)
- Coordinates: 26.4567577°N 91.8293953°E
- Country: India
- State: Assam
- District: Darrang
- Founder: Government of Assam
- Named for: Dipila GP

Government
  - Type: GP
  - Body: 1
- Elevation: 15 m (49 ft)

Population (2011)
  - Total: 10,010

Languages
  - Official: Assamese
- Time zone: UTC+5:30 (IST)
- PIN: 784144
- Vehicle registration: AS-13 * ****
- Sex ratio: 923:1000 ?/?
- Website: darrang.nic.in

Dipila is a village in the Darrang district under Sipajhar constituency. From historical events, it is found that, the name Dipila came from a king named Dippal.
