= Duni, Assam =

Duni
- Village
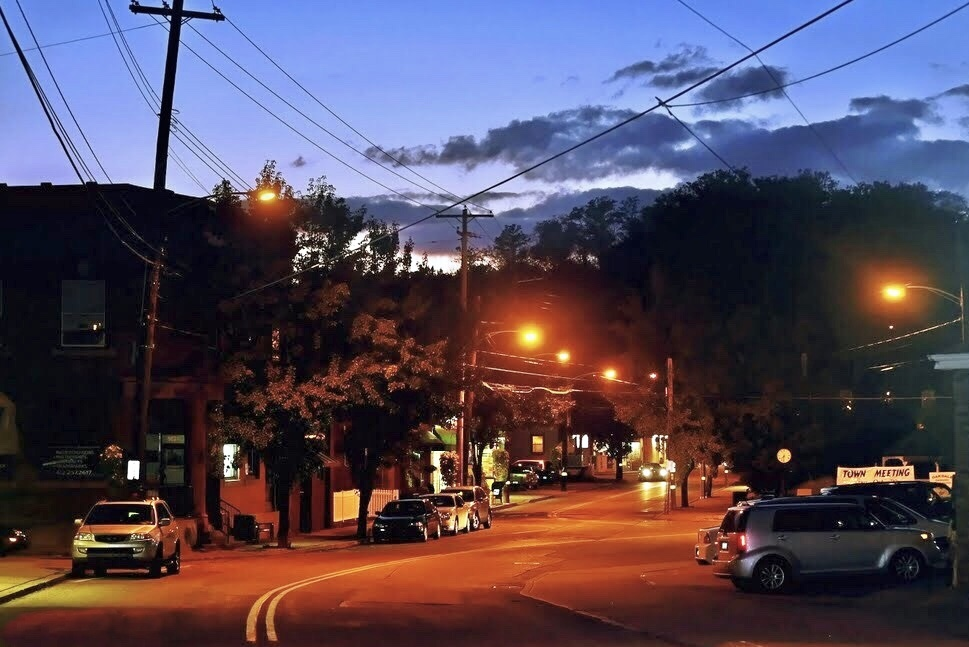
- View of Dipila-Borichowka Road in Duni, Assam

- Location in Assam Duni (India)
- Coordinates: 26.27421°N 91.49338°E
- Country: India
- State: Assam
- Region: North Assam
- District: Darrang
- Founded by: Government of Assam

Government
  - Body: Duni Gram Panchayat
- Elevation: 116 m (381 ft)

Population (2011)
  - Total: 6,763

Languages
  - Official: Assamese
- Time zone: UTC+5:30 (IST)
- PIN: 784148
- Vehicle registration: AS-13
- Planning agency: 1
- Climate: Semi-Arid (Köppen)
- ^{† Estimated as on 2012}

Duni is an urban village of Sipajhar Constituency, Darrang District, Assam, India. It is one of major place in Darrang district. It is in the west part of the district. Duni is near Patharighat (earlier Patharughat) the historical place where more than 140 farmer had sacrifice their life against British in the year 1894.

It is located 22 km west from District headquarters Mangaldai. 10 km from Sipajhar. 43 km from State capital Dispur

Duni Pin code is 784148 and postal head office is Duni (Darrang).

Patharighat (7 km), Byaspara (9 km), Namkhola (9 km), Burhinagar (9 km), Deomornoi (9 km) are the nearby villages to Duni. Duni is surrounded by Bihdia Tehsil to the west, Bezera (Pt) Tehsil to the south, Bezera Tehsil to the south, Khoirabari Tehsil to the north.

Mangaldoi, Rangia, Guwahati, Dispur are the nearby cities to Duni. This place is in the border of the Darrang District and Kamrup District.

== Education ==
SL No.	School	Type
1	Duni Higher Secondary School	Governmental
2	Duni College, Dolonghat	Governmental
3	Duni M V School	Governmental
4	Pachim Darrang Jatiya Vidyalaya	Non-Governmental
5	Mahoripara L.P School	Governmental
6	Padmathan L.P School	Governmental
7	Duni Jatiya Vidyalaya	Non-Governmental
8	Duni B Barua Junior College	Non-Governmental
