= Duni =

Duni is a surname. Notable people with the surname include:

- Egidio Duni (1708–1775), Italian composer
- Elina Duni (born 1981), Swiss-Albanian singer and composer
- Juma Duni Haji (born 1950), Tanzanian politician and civil servant

== See also ==
- Duni, Assam, an urban village in India
