= Orang National Park =

National park in the state of Assam, India

- IUCN category II (national park)
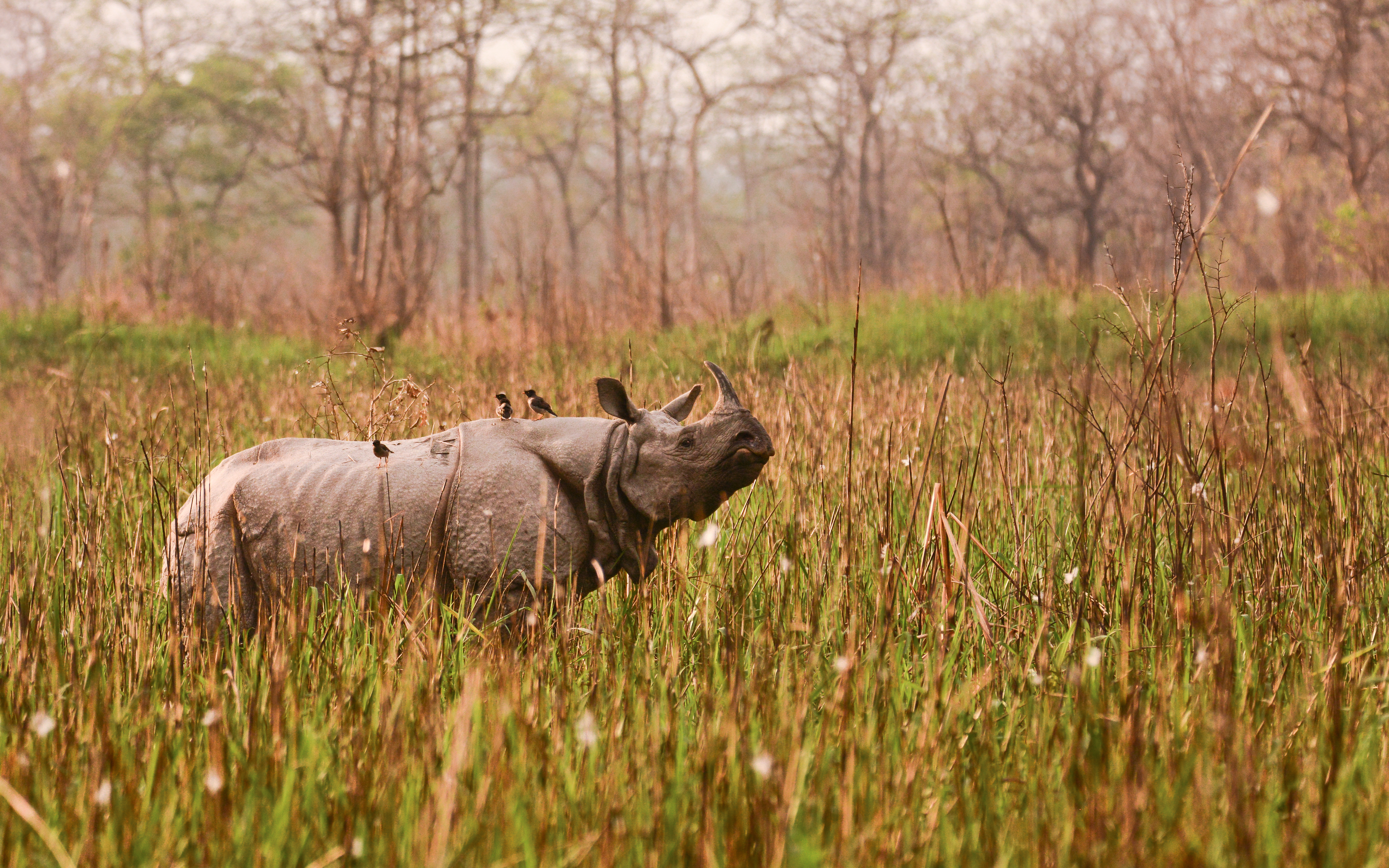
- Greater one-horned rhinoceros in Orang National Park

- Location within Assam Location within India
- Interactive map of Orang National Park
- Location: Darrang and Sonitpur district, Assam, India
- Coordinates: 26.5568148°N 92.3279016°E
- Area: 78.81 km^{2} (30.43 sq mi)
- Established: 1985; 41 years ago
- Governing body: Government of India, Government of Assam

Orang National Park is a national park in India located on the northern bank of the Brahmaputra River in the Darrang and Sonitpur districts of Assam. It covers an area of 79.28 km^{2} (30.61 mi^{2}). It was established as a sanctuary in 1985 and declared a national park on 13 April 1999. It is rich in flora and fauna, including great Indian rhinoceros, pygmy hog, Asian elephant, wild water buffalo and the Bengal tiger.

== History ==
The park has a chequered history of habitation. Up to 1900, it was inhabited by the local tribes. On account of an epidemic disease, the tribal population abandoned the area. In 1919 the British colonial authorities declared it as Orang Game Reserve vide notice No. 2276/R dated 31 May 1915. The game reserve came under the control of the wildlife wing of the State Forest Department to meet the requirements of Project Tiger. It was established as a wildlife sanctuary in 1985, vide notification No. FRS 133/85/5 dated 20 September 1985. The park was renamed the Rajiv Gandhi Wildlife Sanctuary in 1992; however, this action had to be reversed due to public pressure against the renaming. Finally, the sanctuary was declared a National Park in 1999, vide notification No. FRW/28/90/154 dated 13 April 1999.

== Geography ==
Orang National Park encompasses an area of 78.81 km^{2} (30.43 mi^{2}) and lies on the north bank of the Brahmaputra River within the districts of Darrang and Sonitpur. Pachnoi river, Belsiri river and Dhansiri rivers border the park and join the Brahmaputra. During the monsoon season, the park becomes a veritable flood plain with the many streams overlapping each other. These flood plains constitute twelve wetlands in the park, apart from the twenty-six artificial water bodies.

The park is thus formed of alluvial flood plains of the many rivers and is an integral part of the Indo-Burma hotspot of biodiversity. The total area of the park has been classified by type of terrain:

- Eastern Himalayan moist deciduous forest 15.85 km^{2} (6.12 sq mi)
- Eastern seasonal swamp forest 3.28 km^{2} (1.27 sq mi)
- Eastern wet alluvial grassland 8.33 km^{2} (3.22 sq mi)
- Savannah grassland 18.17 km^{2} (7.02 sq mi)
- Degraded grassland 10.36 km^{2} (4.00 sq mi)
- Bodies of water 6.13 km^{2} (2.37 sq mi)
- Moist sandy area- 2.66 km^{2} (1.03 sq mi)
- Dry sandy area 4.02 km^{2} (1.55 sq mi)

It has a fairly flat terrain tending north to south with a gentle slope. The elevation in the park varies from 45 m (148 ft) to 70 m (230 ft). It is bounded on its south and east by islands and spill channels of the river. The flat alluvial land is seen as two distinct terraces; the lower terrace is of recent origin on the bank of the Brahmaputra River and the other, upper, terrace is to the north, separated by a high bank running through the park. The whole park is encircled by inhabited villages thus subjecting it to biotic anthropogenic pressure. It has fox holes built by the villagers on its west.

=== Climate ===
The climate in the park comprises three seasons, namely summer, monsoon and winter. The park is subject to subtropical monsoon climate with rainfall occurring mostly during the period from May to September. The average annual rainfall is 3,000 mm (120 in). Temperature varies during the months of October to March from 5–15 °C (41–59 °F) in the mornings to 20–25 °C (68–77 °F) in the afternoons, in April from 12–25 °C (54–77 °F) in the morning to 25–30 °C (77–86 °F) in the afternoon; and in May to June from 20–28 °C (68–82 °F) in the morning to 30–32 °C (86–90 °F) in the afternoon. Humidity in the park varies from 66% to 95%.

== Fauna ==
=== Mammalian species ===
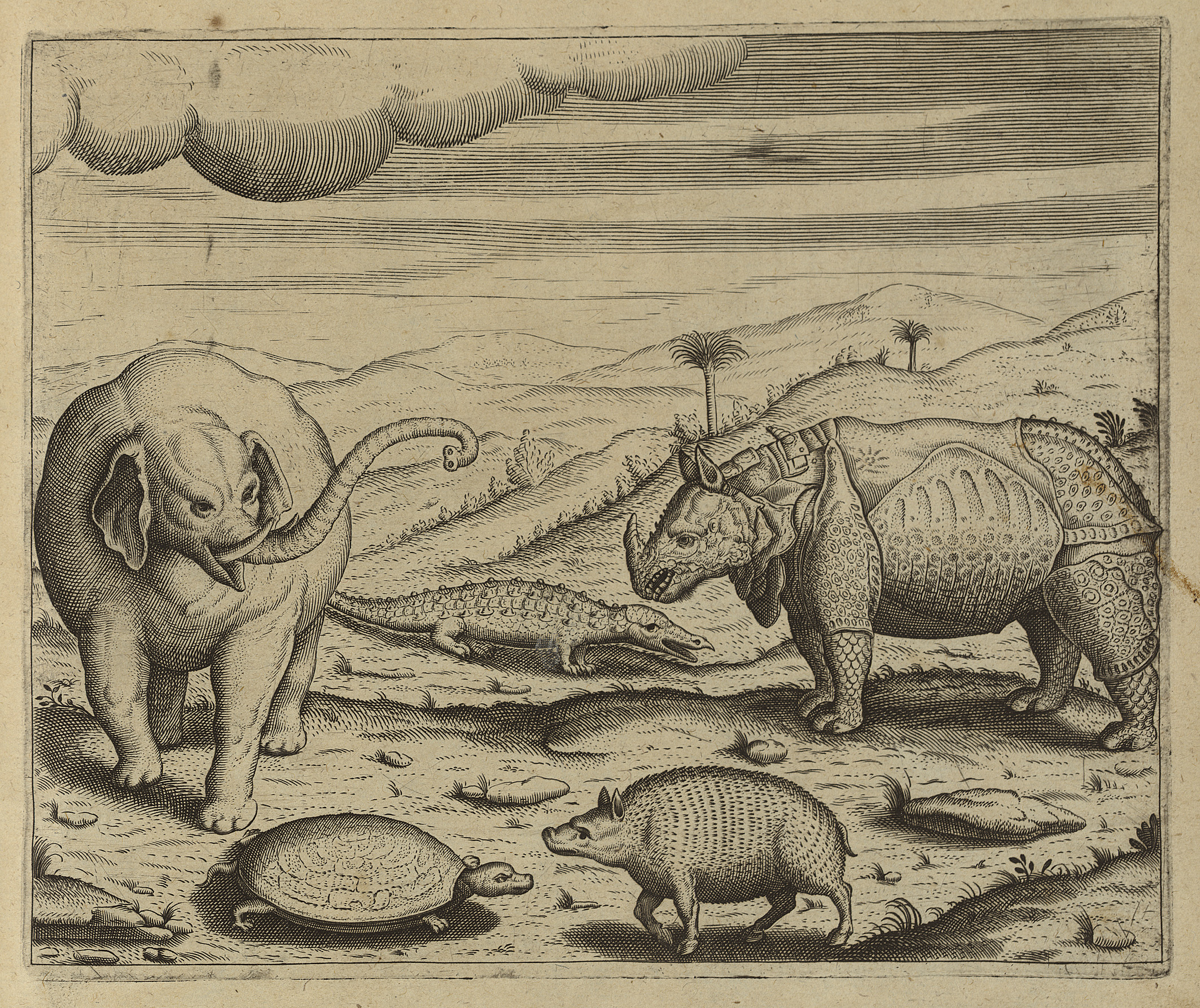
A sketch of elephant, rhinoceros and pygmy hog (Porcula salvania) (an endangered species of small wild pig)

Orang park contains significant breeding populations of several mammalian species. Apart from the great Indian one-horned rhinoceros (68 at the last count), which is the dominant species of the national park, the other key species sharing the habitat are the royal Bengal tiger (Panthera tigris), Asiatic elephant, pygmy hog, hog deer and wild boar. Some important species of the critically endangered and endangered category are the following.

The pygmy hog, a small wild pig, is critically endangered, C2a(ii) ver 3.1 as per IUCN listing, and is limited to about 75 animals in captivity, confined to a very few locations in and around north-western Assam, including the Orang National Park where it has been re-introduced. Other mammals reported are the blind Gangetic dolphin, Indian pangolin, hog deer (Axis porcinus), rhesus macaque, Bengal porcupine, Indian fox, small Indian civet, otter, leopard cat (Prionailurus bengalensis), fishing cat (Prionailurus viverrinus) and jungle cat (Felis chaus).

The Bengal tiger (Panthera tigris tigris) population was estimated to comprise 19 individuals in 2000, based on pug marks.

=== Fishes ===
More than 60 species of fish have been recorded in the rivers and channels flowing through the park.

=== Avian fauna ===
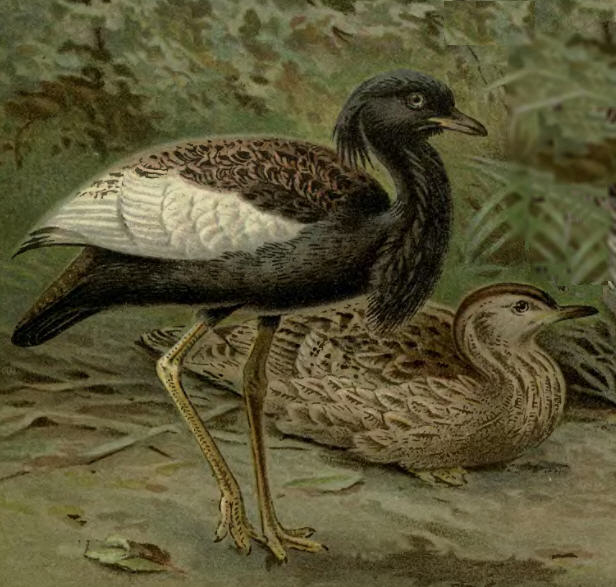
Bengal florican, a threatened species conserved in the park

Due to its variety of birdlife, including endangered and rare species, the park is listed as one of BirdLife International's "Important Bird and Biodiversity Areas" (IBAs); they consider it the most important bird wet-grassland site on the Indo-Gangetic Plain, and one of three "outstanding" IBAs in Assam. It is home to a variety of migratory birds, water birds, predators, scavengers and game birds.

Forty-seven species from the bird families Anatidae, Accipitridae, Addenda, and Ardeidae are found in the park with maximum number of species. So far, 222 bird species have been recorded, some of which are: spot-billed pelican (Pelicanus philippensis), great white pelican, black-necked stork (Ephippiorhynchus asiaticus), greater adjutant stork (Leptoptilos dubius), lesser adjutant stork (Leptoptilos javanicus), ruddy shelduck (Tadorna ferruginea), gadwall (Anas strepera), brahminy duck, mallard (Anas platyrhynchos), pintail (Anas acuta), hornbills, Pallas's fish eagle (Haliaeetus leucoryphus), king fisher and woodpecker, in addition to forest and grassland birds.

The Bengal florican (Houbaropsis bengalensis) is listed as Critically Endangered on the IUCN Red List and is one of the flagship species of the park. A population of 30−40 individuals was recorded in the park by the Bombay Natural History Society (BNHS) in 1990; this was the second highest concentration of the species, globally. As of 2023 Orang has in excess of one per cent of the world's total population of the bird.

=== Reptiles ===
Seven species of turtle and tortoise are found, of which the turtle species Lissemys punctata and Kachuga tecta are common. Among snakes, pythons and cobra species, including the king cobra, are recorded here, as are the Indian rock python, and Bungarus niger, the greater black krait. Monitor lizards are present.

== Flora ==
The park is rich in vegetation of forests, natural forest, grasses, and aquatic and non-aquatic plants. The forest species found are: Bombax ceiba, Dalbergia sissoo, Sterculia villosa, Trewia nudiflora, Ziziphus jujuba and Litsea monopetala (syn. L. polyantha). Among the non-aquatic grassland species, the prominent are: Phragmites karka, Arundo donax, Imperata cylindrica and Saccharum spp. The aquatic grass and plants species found are: Andropogon spp., Ipomoea aquatica (syn. Ipomoea reptans), Enhydra fluctuans, Nymphaea spp., and Water hyacinth (Eichhornia spp.).

== Threats and conservation ==
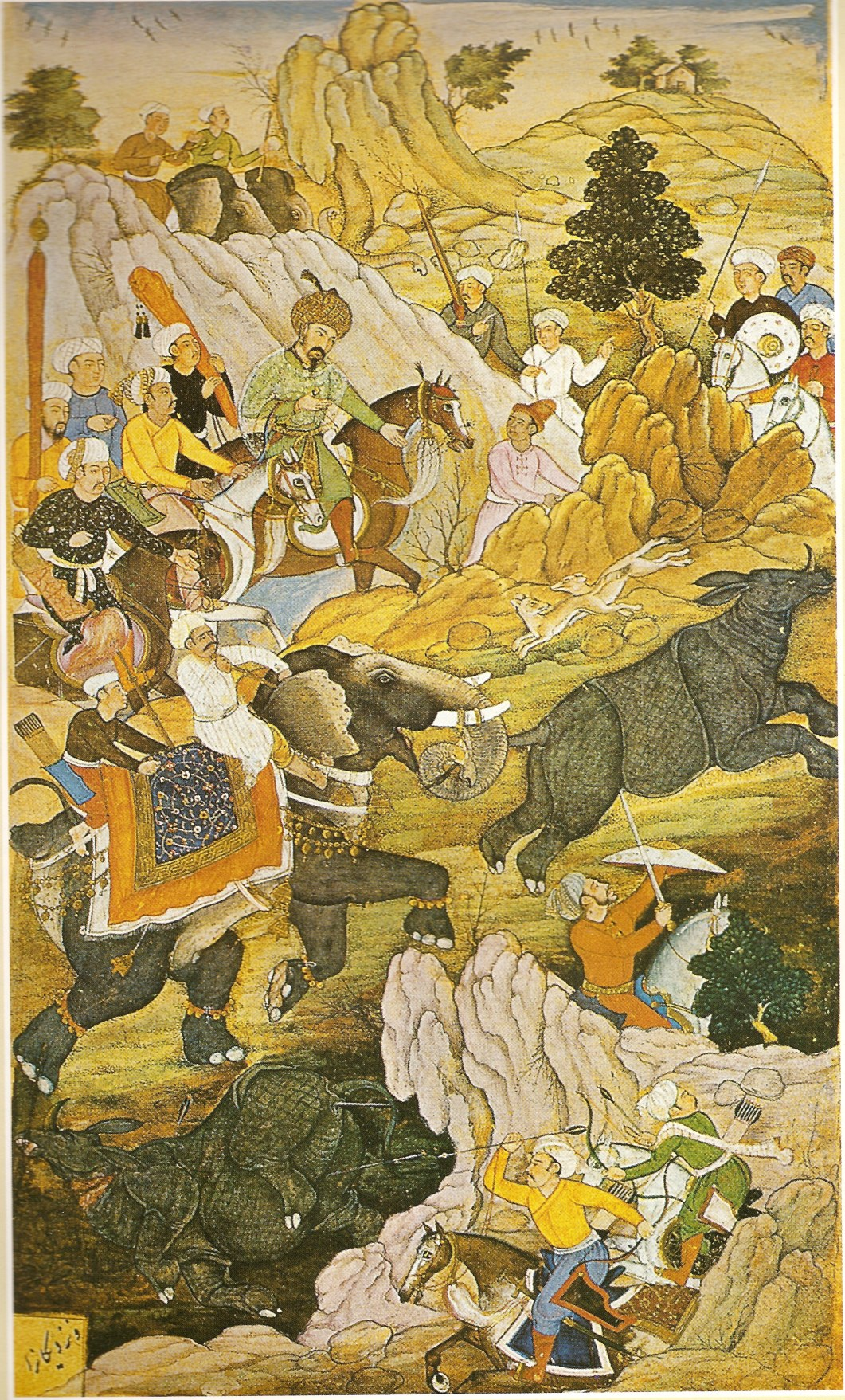
Hunting, an ancient sport - a painting of rhinoceros hunting from Babarnama

From 1991, there was a serious threat to the survival of the park and its wild animals due to intense anthropogenic pressure— including illegal occupation by immigrants from the neighbouring country and encroachment from agriculture and forest resource harvesting by local populations dependent for their livelihoods on such practices —and by insurgency. The threats were identified as due to poaching, inadequate manpower for patrolling and security, wide river channels, inadequate infrastructure facilities and hardly any community awareness and participation in conservation.

Poaching for wild animals became very serious, particularly of the great Indian rhinoceros whose population reduced to 48 vis-à-vis 97 rhinoceros in 1991. By undertaking anti poaching measures, their number had increased to 68 in 2006-2007 but poaching and killing of rhinos are still reported. To check this continued poaching, a "Coordination Committee" with top officials of Darrang, Sonitpur and the Marigaon districts, including officials of the Forest Department of Assam has been set up. Under an initiative by the World Association of Zoos and Aquariums (WAZA), the Orang National Park was identified for conservation to evolve policies and programmes to protect the Indian rhinos and to assist in the development of the park. WWF India, the Government of Assam and the International Rhino Foundation (IRF), with support from Zoo Basel, (Switzerland) and the IRV 2020, have undertaken this operation. WWF and Government of India, under the project titled "Rhino Vision India (RVI)", have also plans to enhance the number of rhinoceros in the park to 300 by 2020, in addition to increasing the number of tigers.

Since royal Bengal tigers are also under serious threat in the park, a conservation programme sponsored by WAZA (World Association of Zoos and Aquariums) institutions and Busch Gardens has been launched. It is a closely managed tiger program called the Species Survival Plan (SSP), with the objective to improve the genetic diversity of managed animal populations. Under this programme, the project titled "Ecological Monitoring of Wild Tigers in Orang National Park, Assam, India" has been launched, in association with AARANYAK, a non-governmental organisation in India. With this funding, camera traps and geo-spatial technology are used by local researchers to monitor tiger density in the park. Community participation to help manage, mitigate and prevent conflict between humans and tigers is also envisaged.
