= Sipajhar =

- Town
- Location in Assam, India Sipajhar (India)
- Coordinates: 26.4009984°N 91.8293953°E
- Country: India
- State: Assam
- Subdivision: Mangaldoi
- District: Darrang
- Zone: 1

Population
  - Total: 15,671 (incl New Sipajhar)

Languages
  - Official: Assamese
- Time zone: UTC+5:30 (IST)
- PIN: 784145
- Telephone code: 03664
- Vehicle registration: AS-13

Sipajhar is a small town in Darrang district of Assam, India. It is around 50 km away from Dispur, capital city of Assam. The district headquarters of Mangaldoi is around 15 km from Sipajhar. National Highway 15 (India) goes through the town.

== Politics ==
Sipajhar is a legislative constituency and it is a part of Mangaldoi (Lok Sabha constituency).
