= Mangaldoi =

Mangaldoi Mangaldai
- Town
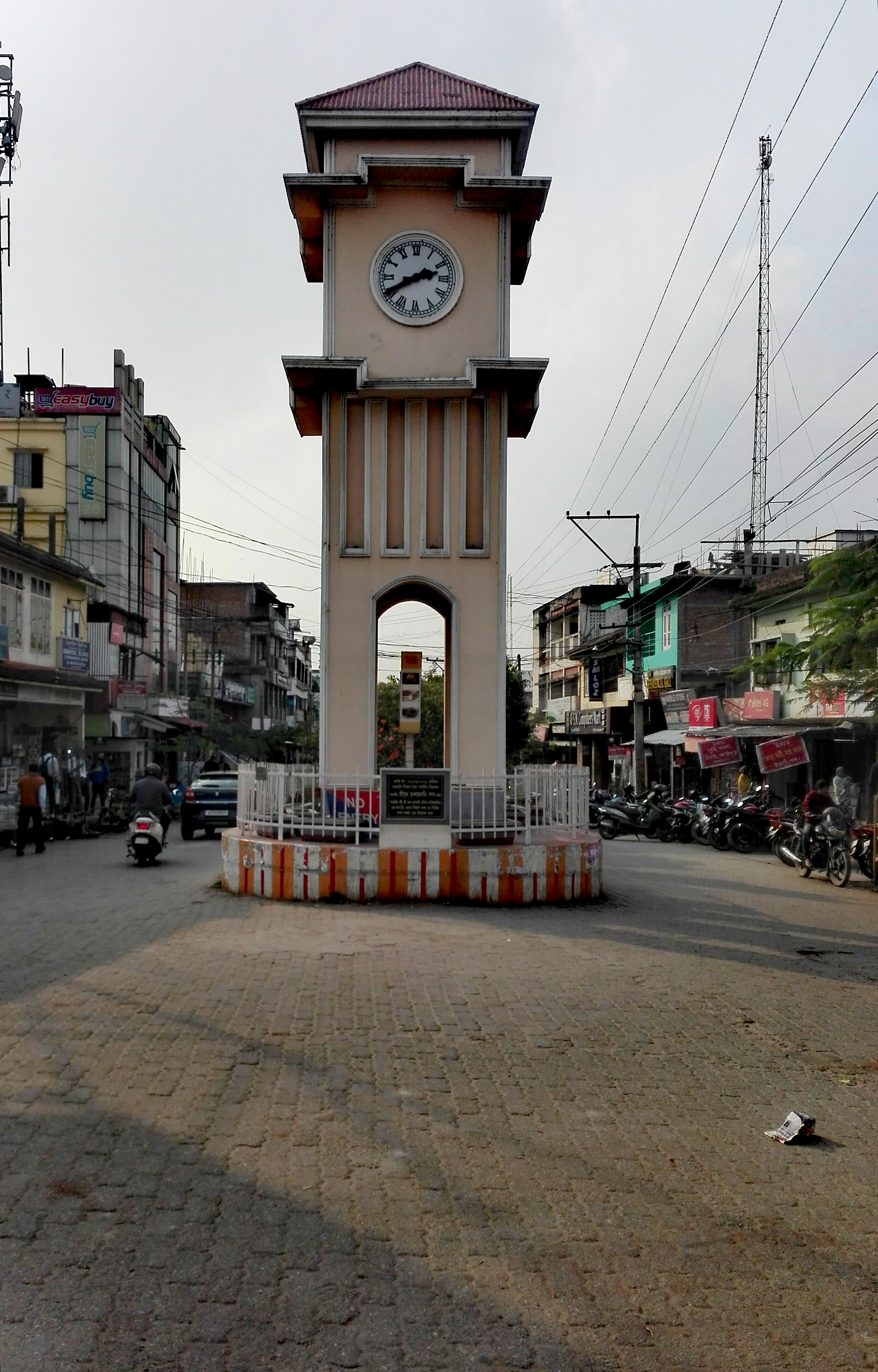
- View of Mangaldoi clock tower

- Location in Assam, India Mangaldoi (India)
- Coordinates: 26.43°N 92.03°E
- Country: India
- State: Assam
- District: Darrang
- Administrative Division: North Assam Division
- Sub-division: Mangaldai
- Founder: Government of Assam
- Named for: Mangaldahi (Mongola Devi)

Government
  - Body: Mangaldoi Municipal Board

Area
  - Total: 10 km^{2} (3.9 sq mi)
- Elevation: 34 m (112 ft)

Population (2011)
  - Total: 25,989
  - Density: 2,600/km^{2} (6,700/sq mi)
- Demonym: Mangaldaian

Languages
  - Official: Assamese
- Time zone: UTC+5:30 (IST)
- PIN: 784125
- Vehicle registration: AS-13
- Sex ratio: 923:1000 ♂/♀
- Website: darrang.gov.in

Mangaldoi; also spelt Mangaldai, Assamese pronunciation: [mɔŋɔldoɪ], is a town in the state of Assam, India. It serves as the administrative headquarters of the Darrang district.

== Etymology ==
It is named after Mangaldahi, who was the daughter of the Raja of Darrang. She was married to the Susenghphaa (r.1603-1641), (also known as Pratap Singha), a ruler of the Ahom kingdom.

== Geography ==
Mangaldoi is located at 26.43°N 92.03°E. It has an average elevation of 34 m (112 ft).

Situated at the north bank of Brahmaputra river, the city is approximately 68 km from Guwahati and 94.1 km from Tezpur.

== Governance ==
Mangaldoi is part of Mangaldoi (Lok Sabha constituency).

Basanta Das of Indian National Congress is the present MLA of Mangaldoi. Dilip Saikia of Bharatiya Janata Party is the present MP of Mangaldoi.

== Demographics ==
As of 2011 India census, Mangaldoi had a population of 36,993 (including Gerimari). Males constituted 52% of the population and females 48%. Mangaldoi had an average literacy rate of 92.57%, higher than the national average of 74.04%: male literacy was 94.95%, and female literacy was 90.09%. In Mangaldoi, 11% of the population was below 6 years of age. The population is largely heterogeneous consisting Assamese, Bengali, Marwadi, Bihari, Punjabi communities. The town has a Hindu majority.

=== Language ===
Languages spoken in Mangaldoi (2011)

Assamese (81.42%)

Bengali (14.49%)

Hindi (2.36%)

Others (1.73%)

Assamese is the most spoken language with 21,161 speakers, followed by Bengali at 3,767 and Hindi at 614.

Languages spoken in Mangaldoi (2011)
1. Assamese (81.4%)
2. Bengali (14.5%)
3. Hindi (2.36%)
4. Others (1.73%)

== Education ==
Assam Skill University (ASU) in Bidya Nagar offers skill development programs in a range of fields, with an emphasis on boosting students' employability and promoting growth within the state. Besides government-run institutions, Mangaldai has also seen a rise in private educational establishments, which has significantly enhanced the area's educational infrastructure.

== Notable people ==
- Ellora Roychoudhury, social worker, activist, and the first woman from Northeast India to posthumously donate organs
