= Darrang district =

Coordinates: 26°45′N 92°30′E

- District of Assam
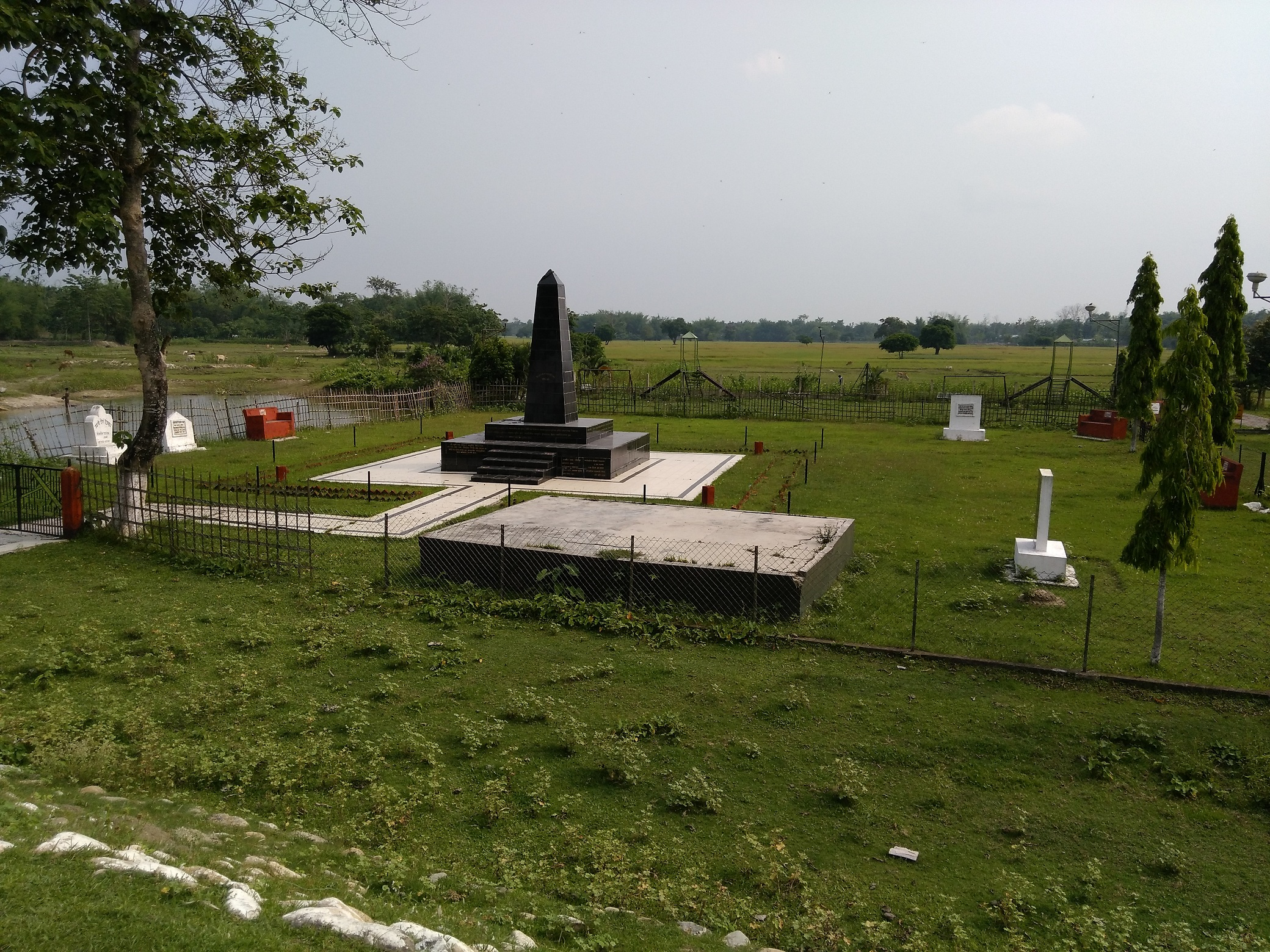
- Swahid Stambha, Patharighat
- Interactive map of Darrang district
- Country: India
- State: Assam
- Division: North Assam
- Headquarters: Mangaldoi

Government
  - Lok Sabha constituencies: Mangaldoi
  - Vidhan Sabha constituencies: Sipajhar, Mangaldoi, Dalgaon , Kalaigaon

Area
  - Total: 1,585 km^{2} (612 sq mi)

Population (2011)
  - Total: 928,500
  - Density: 585.8/km^{2} (1,517/sq mi)
- Time zone: UTC+05:30 (IST)
- ISO 3166 code: IN-AS
- Website: https://darrang.assam.gov.in/

Darrang district (Assamese pronunciation: [dɔrɔŋ]) is an administrative district in the state of Assam in India. The district headquarters are located at Mangaldoi. The district occupies an area of 1585 km^{2}.

== Etymology ==
The etymology of Darrang reflects its historical significance as a gateway. According to scholar Late Dineshwar Sarma, the name comes from the Assamese word "Doar," meaning "door," which refers to the alluvial floodplains in eastern and northeastern India that have long served as passageways for traders and travelers from the Himalaya and also as critical entry point for merchants from regions such as China, Tibet, Bhutan, and Central Asia.

== History ==
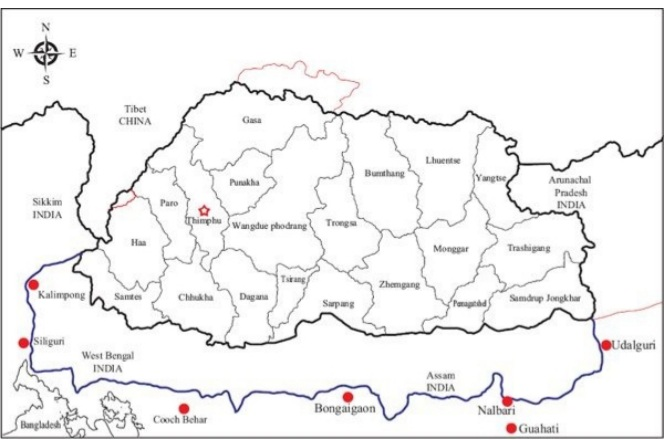
Southern Boundary of Bhutan contained the present Darrang district before the 1865 Duar War

No definitive records about Darrang are available for the pre-medieval period. According to Maheswar Neog, the Darrang became mentioned only after the uprising of the king Nara Narayan. Darrang at different times might have been under the rule of the Chutia Kingdom, Bodo people and Baro-Bhuyans.

During the reign of Dharmanarayan 3000 Chutia families were established in Darrang.

In the 16th century, Darrang was subject to the Kamata king Nara Narayan, and on the division of his dominion among his heirs, Darrang became a part of Koch Hajo. Early in the 17th century the Raja Bali Narayan invoked the aid of the Ahoms of Upper Assam against the Mughal invaders; after his defeat and death in 1637 the Ahoms dominated the whole district. About 1785 the Darrang rajas took advantage of the decline of the Ahom kingdom to try to re-establish their independence, but they were defeated by a British expedition in 1792, and in 1826 Darrang, with the rest of Assam, passed under British control.

By early 17th century, the Kingdom of Bhutan took control of the Darrang Duars as far as Gohain Kamal Ali road. The Bhutan control over these regions were through local authorities, who were appointed by Bhutanese provincial governors called Ponlops. By 1865, with the Duar Wars the British East India company took control of the Duars and removed Bhutanese influence from the area.

In 1785 it was Darrang was surveyed by one Ahom officer named Dhani Ram Gohain.

On 28 January 1894, there was a peasant's uprising against the increased land revenue by the British Raj in Patharighat, a village in Darrang district. In the British response that followed, 140 peasants belonging to both Hindu and Muslim communities died from bullet wounds and another 150 were injured.

In 1984 Sonitpur district was formed from part of Darrang. This was repeated on 14 June 2004 with the creation of Udalguri district.

== Geography ==
Darrang district occupies an area of 1,585 square kilometres (612 sq mi).

=== National protected area ===
Darrang is home to Orang National Park, which it shares with Sonitpur district. Orang was established in 1999 and has an area of 79 km^{2} (30.5 mi^{2}).

== Divisions ==
There are four Assam Legislative Assembly constituencies in this district: Kalaigaon, Sipajhar, Mangaldoi, and Dalgaon. Mangaldoi is designated for scheduled castes. All four are in the Mangaldoi Lok Sabha constituency.

=== Villages ===
- Metapara
- Bahgarah
- Dipila
- Gakhirkhowa para
- Namkhola
- Patharighat
- Fakirpara
- Ghenamari

== Demographics ==
Historical population
Year	Pop.	±% p.a.
1901	99,002	—
1911	98,758	−0.02%
1921	110,391	+1.12%
1931	139,089	+2.34%
1941	188,189	+3.07%
1951	233,607	+2.19%
1961	310,321	+2.88%
1971	404,961	+2.70%
1991	618,653	+2.14%
2001	759,858	+2.08%
2011	928,500	+2.02%

According to the 2011 census Darrang district has a population of 928,500, roughly equal to the nation of Fiji. This gives it a ranking of 463rd in India (out of a total of 640). The district has a population density of 586 inhabitants per square kilometre (1,520/sq mi). Its population growth rate over the decade 2001-2011 was 22.19%. Darrang has a sex ratio of 954 females for every 1000 males, and a literacy rate of 63.08%. 93.9% of the population live in rural areas while 6.1% live in urban areas. Poverty rate of the district stands at 45.5%. 5.98% of the population lives in urban areas. Scheduled Castes and Scheduled Tribes make up 4.34% and 0.91% of the population respectively.

=== Religions ===
Religion in Darrang district (2011)
1. Islam (64.3%)
2. Hinduism (35.5%)
3. Others (0.12%)

Population of subdistricts by religion
Subdistricts	Muslims	Hindus	Others
Khoirabari (Pt)	4.74%	95.19%	0.07%
Patharighat (Pt)	35.18%	64.69%	0.13%
Sipajhar	46.23%	53.56%	0.21%
Mangaldoi (Pt)	42.36%	57.22%	0.42%
Kalaigaon (Pt)	10.25%	89.60%	0.15%
Dalgaon (Pt)	88.27%	11.20%	0.53%

In Darrang district, as per the 2011 census record, Islam is the most followed religion with 597,392 adherents i.e. (64.34%), while Hinduism is followed by 327,322 i.e. 35.25% of the district population. Dalgaon in particular contained nearly half the population of the entire district. Way back in 1971, Hindus were slight majority in undivided Darrang district (which includes present Sonitpur and Udalguri districts) forming 70.3% of the population, while Muslims were 23.9% at that time.

=== Languages ===
Languages in Darrang district (2011)
1. Assamese (49.3%)
2. Bengali (48.4%)
3. Hindi (0.68%)
4. Boro (0.45%)
5. Bhojpuri (0.37%)
6. Sadri (0.19%)
7. Others (0.62%)

At the time of the 2011 census, the Assamese-speaking population was 457,696 and the Bengali-speaking population was 449,205.
